= Paraverse =

British television drama franchise

- Created by: Robert Thorogood; Tony Jordan; Peter Mattessi
- Original work: Death in Paradise (2011-)
- Owner: Red Planet Pictures
- Years: 2011–present

Films and television
- Television series: Death in Paradise (2011-); Beyond Paradise (2023–); Return to Paradise (2024–)

Audio
- Soundtracks: You're Wondering Now; Beyond Paradise: Just as the Tide Was Flowing

The Paraverse is a British television drama franchise produced by Red Planet Pictures and centred on the crime drama Death in Paradise. The franchise consists of three series: Death in Paradise (2011–present), the original series; Beyond Paradise (2023–present), the first spin-off; and Return to Paradise (2024–present), the second spin-off.

== Cast ==
=== Death in Paradise (2011-) ===
| Character | Position | Portrayed by | Duration | | | | | | | | | | | | | | | |
| Character | Position | Portrayed by | Duration | Series | | | | | | | | | | | | | | |
| Character | Position | Portrayed by | Duration | 1 | 2 | 3 | 4 | 5 | 6 | 7 | 8 | 9 | 10 | 11 | 12 | 13 | 14 | 15 |
|---|---|---|---|---|---|---|---|---|---|---|---|---|---|---|---|---|---|---|
| Selwyn Patterson | Commissioner | Don Warrington | 2011- | Main | Main | Main | Main | Main | Main | Main | Main | Main | Main | Main | Main | Main | Main | Main |
| Richard Poole | Detective Inspector | Ben Miller | 2011–2013 & 2021 | Main | Main | Guest | —N/a | —N/a | —N/a | —N/a | —N/a | —N/a | Guest | —N/a | —N/a | —N/a | —N/a | —N/a |
| Humphrey Goodman | Detective Inspector | Kris Marshall | 2014–2017 | —N/a | —N/a | Main | Main | Main | Main | —N/a | —N/a | —N/a | —N/a | —N/a | —N/a | —N/a | —N/a | —N/a |
| Jack Mooney | Detective Inspector | Ardal O'Hanlon | 2017–2020 | —N/a | —N/a | —N/a | —N/a | —N/a | Main | Main | Main | Main | —N/a | —N/a | —N/a | —N/a | —N/a | —N/a |
| Neville Parker | Detective Inspector | Ralf Little | 2020–2024 | —N/a | —N/a | —N/a | —N/a | —N/a | —N/a | —N/a | —N/a | Main | Main | Main | Main | Main | —N/a | —N/a |
| Mervin Wilson | Detective Inspector | Don Gilet | 2024– | —N/a | —N/a | —N/a | —N/a | —N/a | —N/a | —N/a | —N/a | —N/a | —N/a | —N/a | —N/a | —N/a | Main | Main |
| Camille Bordey | Detective Sergeant | Sara Martins | 2011–2015 | Main | Main | Main | Main | —N/a | —N/a | —N/a | —N/a | —N/a | Guest | —N/a | —N/a | Guest | —N/a | —N/a |
| Florence Cassell | Detective Sergeant | Joséphine Jobert | 2015–2019, 2021-2022, 2024 | —N/a | —N/a | —N/a | Main | Main | Main | Main | Main | —N/a | Main | Main | —N/a | Guest | —N/a | —N/a |
| Madeleine Dumas | Detective Sergeant | Aude Legastelois-Bidé | 2019–2020 | —N/a | —N/a | —N/a | —N/a | —N/a | —N/a | —N/a | Main | Main | —N/a | —N/a | —N/a | —N/a | —N/a | —N/a |
| Naomi Thomas | Detective Sergeant | Shantol Jackson | 2022- | —N/a | —N/a | —N/a | —N/a | —N/a | —N/a | —N/a | —N/a | —N/a | —N/a | Main | Main | Main | Main | Main |
| Fidel Best | Officer | Gary Carr | 2011-2014 | Main | Main | Main | —N/a | —N/a | —N/a | —N/a | —N/a | —N/a | —N/a | —N/a | —N/a | —N/a | —N/a | —N/a |
| Dwayne Myers | Officer | Danny John-Jules | 2011-2018, 2024 | Main | Main | Main | Main | Main | Main | Main | —N/a | —N/a | —N/a | —N/a | —N/a | Main | —N/a | —N/a |
| J. P Hooper | Officer | Tobi Bakare | 2015-2021, 2024-2025 | —N/a | —N/a | —N/a | Main | Main | Main | Main | Main | Main | Main | —N/a | —N/a | Main | Main | —N/a |
| Ruby Pattison | Officer | Shyko Amos | 2019–2020 | —N/a | —N/a | —N/a | —N/a | —N/a | —N/a | —N/a | Main | Main | —N/a | —N/a | —N/a | —N/a | —N/a | —N/a |
| Marlon Pryce | Officer | Tahj Miles | 2020-2024 | —N/a | —N/a | —N/a | —N/a | —N/a | —N/a | —N/a | —N/a | —N/a | Main | Main | Main | Main | —N/a | —N/a |
| Darlene Curtis | Officer | Ginny Holder | 2018, 2022-2025 | —N/a | —N/a | —N/a | —N/a | —N/a | —N/a | Guest | —N/a | —N/a | —N/a | Main | Main | Main | Main | —N/a |
| Sebastian Rose | Officer | Shaquille Ali-Yebuah | 2025– | —N/a | —N/a | —N/a | —N/a | —N/a | —N/a | —N/a | —N/a | —N/a | —N/a | —N/a | —N/a | —N/a | Main | Main |
| Mattie Fletcher | Officer | Catherine Garton | 2026– | —N/a | —N/a | —N/a | —N/a | —N/a | —N/a | —N/a | —N/a | —N/a | —N/a | —N/a | —N/a | —N/a | —N/a | Main |
| Catherine Bordey | Owner of Catherine's Bar | Élizabeth Bourgine | 2011– | Recurring | Main | Main | Main | Main | Main | Main | Main | Main | Main | Main | Main | Main | Main | Main |
| Catherine Bordey | Mayor | Élizabeth Bourgine | 2011– | Recurring | Main | Main | Main | Main | Main | Main | Main | Main | Main | Main | Main | Main | Main | Main |

=== Beyond Paradise (2023-) ===
| Character | Position | Portrayed by | Duration | Series | | | |
| Character | Position | Portrayed by | Duration | 1 | 2 | 3 | 4 |
|---|---|---|---|---|---|---|---|
| Humphrey Goodman | Detective Inspector | Kris Marshall | 2023- | Main | Main | Main | Main |
| Esther Williams | Detective Sergeant | Zahra Ahmadi | 2023- | Main | Main | Main | Main |
| Kelby Hartford | Officer | Dylan Llewellyn | 2023- | Main | Main | Main | Main |
| Margo Martins | Office Support | Felicity Montagu | 2023- | Main | Main | Main | Main |
| Charlie Woods | Commissioner | Jade Harrison | 2023-2025 | R | Main | Main | —N/a |
| Jimmy Smith | Commissioner | Vincent Franklin | 2026 | —N/a | —N/a | —N/a | R |

=== Return to Paradise (2024-) ===
| Character | Position | Portrayed by | Duration | Series | | |
| Character | Position | Portrayed by | Duration | 1 | 2 | 3 |
|---|---|---|---|---|---|---|
| Mackenzie "Mack" Clarke | Detective Inspector | A. Samson | 2024- | Main | Main | Main |
| Colin Cartwright | Detective Sergeant | Lloyd Griffith | 2024- | Main | Main | Main |
| Felix Wilkinson | Officer | Aaron L. McGrath | 2024- | Main | Main | Main |
| Reggie Rocco | Officer | Celia Ireland | 2024- | Main | Main | Main |
| Philomena Strong | Senior Sergeant | Catherine McClements | 2024- | Main | Main | Main |
| Glenn Strong | Pathologist | Tai Hara | 2024- | Main | Main | —N/a |
| Glenn Strong | Former Pathologist | Tai Hara | 2024- | —N/a | —N/a | Main |
| Leo Drake | Pathologist | Jacob Collins-Levy | 2026- | —N/a | —N/a | Main |

== Show ==
=== Death in Paradise (2011-) ===
Detective Inspector Richard Poole (Ben Miller) is sent from the Metropolitan Police in London to investigate the murder of Charlie Hulme, a British police officer on the fictional Caribbean island of Saint Marie, a British Overseas Territory with a French colonial history. After he finds the murderer (later revealed to be Sergeant Lily Thompson), he is ordered by his supervisors to stay on as the Detective Inspector (DI) of the island, much to his dismay, solving new cases as they appear and being the object of many fish-out-of-water jokes. At the start of series 3, Poole is himself murdered while attending a 25th anniversary party and clumsy London DI Humphrey Goodman (Kris Marshall) arrives to investigate the death of his deadpan predecessor. After he finds the murderer (later revealed to be Helen Reed), he stays on the island permanently after learning from his wife, Sally, that she is leaving him. In the second half of series 6, he resigns so he can start a new life in London with his new girlfriend Martha Lloyd (who he later marries), after forming a relationship with her while she was staying at Saint Marie on holiday. Goodman's replacement on Saint Marie is DI Jack Mooney (Ardal O'Hanlon), a recent widower grieving the loss of his wife and who assisted the team on a case in London. Mooney embraces island life and remains on Saint Marie until mid-way through series 9, when he decides he is ready to face the memory of his deceased wife and returns to London to be with his daughter. Mooney's replacement is DI Neville Parker (Ralf Little), who, like DI Poole before him, initially dislikes being on the island and has severe allergies, especially to bug bites. He comes to the island only because the team needs a British detective to sign off on a case and is forced to stay longer after a period of illness renders him temporarily unfit to travel. However, he decides to remain on the island and eventually warms to the island lifestyle. He stays until series 13, when he departs to travel and be in a relationship with former Detective Sergeant (DS) Florence Cassell (Joséphine Jobert), who joined the team initially as an Officer after Sergeant Fidel Best departed following series 3. During the Christmas 2024 special, Commissioner Selwyn Patterson (Don Warrington) calls London for yet another replacement DI to lead investigations in Saint Marie. Mervin Wilson (Don Gilet) happens to be visiting the island on holiday. As he is boarding the aircraft to take him away from the 'slow-paced' island, he receives a telephone call from his superior ordering him to stay and solve the murder. Although Wilson is annoyed by island life (much like DIs Poole and, initially, Parker before him), a personal connection to Saint Marie spurs him to remain there.

=== Beyond Paradise (2023-) ===
The show follows Detective Inspector Humphrey Goodman, who left Saint Marie to be with Martha Lloyd. After becoming engaged, the couple move to Martha's hometown of Shipton Abbott, near the Devon coast. Not long after arriving, Humphrey joins the small local police force, where he quickly makes an impression on the local officers: Detective Sergeant Esther Williams, PC Kelby Hartford, and office support worker Margo Martins who, along with stories featuring local aspects including (fictional) local sinister superstitions, bring a whole new approach to police work.

=== Return to Paradise (2024-) ===
Australian-born Detective Inspector Mackenzie Clarke works for London's Metropolitan Police as the series starts. She returns to her home town of Dolphin Cove to help fix up her mother's house, but ends up temporarily re-joining the local police team to help them solve a murder. When her return to London is delayed by allegations of evidence tampering, she is forced to remain indefinitely. Complicating her new position is the fact that one of her co-workers is her former fiancé whom she left at the altar years earlier, and her boss is her would-have-been mother-in-law.
