= List of Death in Paradise characters =

This article lists characters from the BBC crime comedy drama Death in Paradise, which began airing in 2011.

== Series main cast timeline ==
Series	Episodes	Detective Inspectors	Detective Sergeants	Officers / Sergeants		Commissioner
1	1–8	Ben Miller	Sara Martins	Danny John-Jules	Gary Carr	Don Warrington
2	1–8	Ben Miller	Sara Martins	Danny John-Jules	Gary Carr	Don Warrington
3		Ben Miller	Sara Martins	Danny John-Jules	Gary Carr	Don Warrington
3	1–8	Kris Marshall	Sara Martins	Danny John-Jules	Gary Carr	Don Warrington
4	1–4	Kris Marshall	Sara Martins	Danny John-Jules	Josephine Jobert	Don Warrington
4	5–8	Kris Marshall	Joséphine Jobert	Danny John-Jules	[Tobi Bakare]	Don Warrington
5	1–8	Kris Marshall	Joséphine Jobert	Danny John-Jules	[Tobi Bakare]	Don Warrington
6	1–6	Kris Marshall	Joséphine Jobert	Danny John-Jules	[Tobi Bakare]	Don Warrington
6	7–8	Ardal O'Hanlon	Joséphine Jobert	Danny John-Jules	[Tobi Bakare]	Don Warrington
7	1–8	Ardal O'Hanlon	Joséphine Jobert	Danny John-Jules	[Tobi Bakare]	Don Warrington
8	1	Ardal O'Hanlon	Joséphine Jobert	—N/a	[Tobi Bakare]	Don Warrington
8	2–6	Ardal O'Hanlon	Joséphine Jobert	Shyko Amos	[Tobi Bakare]	Don Warrington
8	7–8	Ardal O'Hanlon	Aude Legastelois-Bidé	Shyko Amos	[Tobi Bakare]	Don Warrington
9	1–4	Ardal O'Hanlon	Aude Legastelois-Bidé	Shyko Amos	[Tobi Bakare]	Don Warrington
9	5–8	Ralf Little	Aude Legastelois-Bidé	Shyko Amos	[Tobi Bakare]	Don Warrington
10	1	Ralf Little	Joséphine Jobert	—N/a	[Tobi Bakare]	Don Warrington
10	2–8	Ralf Little	Joséphine Jobert	Tahj Miles	[Tobi Bakare]	Don Warrington
11	CS	Ralf Little	Joséphine Jobert	Tahj Miles	Danny John-Jules	Don Warrington
11	1–4	Ralf Little	Joséphine Jobert	Tahj Miles	Shantol Jackson	Don Warrington
11	5–8	Ralf Little	Shantol Jackson	Tahj Miles	Ginny Holder	Don Warrington
12	CS	Ralf Little	Shantol Jackson	Tahj Miles	Ginny Holder	Don Warrington
12	1−8	Ralf Little	Shantol Jackson	Tahj Miles	Ginny Holder	Don Warrington
13	CS	Ralf Little	Shantol Jackson	Tahj Miles	Ginny Holder	Don Warrington
13	1–5	Ralf Little	Shantol Jackson	Tahj Miles	Ginny Holder	Don Warrington
13	6–8	Ralf Little	Shantol Jackson	Danny John-Jules	Ginny Holder	Don Warrington
14	CS	Don Gilet	Shantol Jackson	Danny John-Jules	Ginny Holder	Don Warrington
14	1	Don Gilet	Shantol Jackson	—N/a	Ginny Holder	Don Warrington
14	2–8	Don Gilet	Shantol Jackson	Shaquille Ali-Yebuah	Ginny Holder	Don Warrington
15	CS	Don Gilet	Shantol Jackson	Shaquille Ali-Yebuah	Ginny Holder	—N/a
15	1–8	Don Gilet	Shantol Jackson	Shaquille Ali-Yebuah	Catherine Garton	Don Warrington
16	CS	Don Gilet	Shantol Jackson	Shaquille Ali-Yebuah	Catherine Garton	Don Warrington

== Characters by season ==
Character	Actor	Occupation	Series / Christmas Specials (CS)																					
Character	Actor	Occupation	1	2	3	4	5	6	7	8	9	10	CS	11	CS	12	CS	13	CS	14	CS	15	CS	16
Richard Poole	Ben Miller	Detective Inspector	Main	Main	G.							G.												
Camille Bordey	Sara Martins	Detective Sergeant	Main	Main	Main	Main						G.						G.						
Fidel Best	Gary Carr	Officer (S1–2); Sergeant (S3)	Main	Main	Main																			
Dwayne Myers	Danny John-Jules	Officer	Main	Main	Main	Main	Main	Main	Main				G.					Main	Main					
Selwyn Patterson	Don Warrington	Commissioner (S1–14, S15–)	Main	Main	Main	Main	Main	Main	Main	Main	Main	Main	Main	Main	Main	Main	Main	Main	Main	Main	Main	Main	Main	Main
Catherine Bordey	Élizabeth Bourgine	Bar Landlady (S1–); Mayor of Honoré (S6–)	R.	Main	Main	Main	Main	Main	Main	Main	Main	Main	Main	Main	Main	Main	Main	Main	Main	Main	Main	Main	Main	Main
Humphrey Goodman	Kris Marshall	Detective Inspector			Main	Main	Main	Main																
Florence Cassell	Joséphine Jobert	Sergeant (S4); Detective Sergeant (S4–8, S10–11, S13)				Main	Main	Main	Main	Main		Main	Main	Main				R.						
JP Hooper	Tobi Bakare	Officer (S4–9); Sergeant (S10); Head of the Police Training Programme (S13–14)				Main	Main	Main	Main	Main	Main	Main						G.		G.				
Jack Mooney	Ardal O'Hanlon	Detective Inspector						Main	Main	Main	Main													
Darlene Curtis	Ginny Holder	Civilian Assistant (S11); Trainee Officer (S12); Officer (S13–14)							R.					Main	Main	Main	Main	Main	Main	Main	Main			
Ruby Patterson	Shyko Amos	Officer								Main	Main													
Madeleine Dumas	Aude Legastelois-Bidé	Detective Sergeant								Main	Main													
Neville Parker	Ralf Little	Detective Inspector									Main	Main	Main	Main	Main	Main	Main	Main						
Marlon Pryce	Tahj Miles	Trainee Officer (S10); Officer (S11–13)										Main	Main	Main	Main	Main	Main	Main						
Naomi Thomas	Shantol Jackson	Detective Sergeant												Main	Main	Main	Main	Main	Main	Main	Main	Main	Main	Main
Mervin Wilson	Don Gilet	Detective Inspector																	Main	Main	Main	Main	Main	Main
Sebastian Rose	Shaquille Ali-Yebuah	Officer																		Main	Main	Main	Main	Main
Mattie Fletcher	Catherine Garton	Sergeant																				Main	Main	Main

== Table of character appearances ==
Character	Actor	Series/Episodes	Episode count †	Years
DI Richard Poole	Ben Miller	1.1-3.1, 10.6	18	2011–2014, 2021
DS Camille Bordey	Sara Martins	1.1-4.4, 10.5-10.6, 13.1	31	2011–2015, 2021, 2024
Officer Dwayne Myers	Danny John-Jules	1.1-7.8, 11.0, 13.6–14.0	60	2011–2018, 2021, 2024
Sergeant Fidel Best	Gary Carr	1.1-3.8	24	2011–2014
Commissioner Selwyn Patterson	Don Warrington	1.1–	99	2011–
Harry the Lizard	Animated	1.1–1.3, 1.5-1.6, 1.8-2.1, 2.4, 2.8-3.3, 3.8-4.5, 4.8-5.2, 5.5, 5.8-6.1, 6.5, 6.7-7.2, 7.5-7.6, 7.8-8.1, 8.8, 9.2-9.5, 9.7-10.1, 10.5-11.1, 11.5, 11.8-12.1, 12.3, 12.5, 12.7, 13.0, 13.4, 13.7, 14.0, 14.4, 15.1-15.2, 15.4-15.6	64	2011–
Marlon Collins	Sean Maguire	1.1, 13.1	2	2011, 2024
Catherine Bordey	Elizabeth Bourgine	1.2–	100	2011–
Aidan Miles	Adrian Dunbar	1.7-1.8	2	2011
DI Humphrey Goodman	Kris Marshall	3.1–6.6	30	2014–2017
Sally Goodman	Morven Christie	3.1, 3.8	2	2014
DS Florence Cassell	Josephine Jobert	4.1–8.6, 10.1–11.4, 13.6–13.8	54	2015–2019, 2021–2022, 2024
Sergeant JP Hooper	Tobi Bakare	4.5–10.8, 13.5, 14.1	54	2015–2021, 2024, 2025
Martin Goodman QC	James Fox (Note: James Fox was not credited for his appearance in episode 4.7.)	4.7-4.8	2	2015
Rosey Fabrice	Fola Evans-Akingbola (2016); Prisca Bakare (2021)	5.3, 5.5-5.6, 5.8; 10.3, 10.8	6	2016, 2021
Martha Lloyd	Sally Bretton	5.8–6.1, 6.3–6.4, 6.6	5	2016–2017
DI Jack Mooney	Ardal O'Hanlon	6.5–9.4	24	2017–2020
Nelson Myers	Ram John Holder	6.5-6.6, 7.7-7.8, 14.0	4	2017-2018, 2024
Siobhan Mooney	Grace Stone	6.6-7.1, 8.8, 9.4	6	2017-2020
Officer Darlene Curtis	Ginny Holder	7.3-7.5, 7.7, 11.5-15.0	36	2018, 2022-2025
Patrice Campbell	Leemore Marrett Jr.	8.1-8.6	6	2019
Ruby Patterson	Shyko Amos	8.2-9.8	15	2019-2020
DS Madeleine Dumas	Aude Legastelois-Bidé	8.7-9.8	10	2019-2020
Anna Masani	Nina Wadia	9.1-9.4	4	2020
DI Neville Parker	Ralf Little	9.5–13.8	40	2020–2024
Officer Marlon Pryce	Tahj Miles	10.2–13.5	32	2021–2024
DS Naomi Thomas	Shantol Jackson	11.1-	42	2022-
Izzy Parker	Kate O'Flynn	11.5-11.7	3	2022
Sophie Chambers / Rebecca Wanslow	Chelsea Edge	12.0–12.2, 12.5–12.8	7	2022–2023
Justin West	Robert Webb	12.2, 12.7	2	2023
DC Andrew Buckley	Kent Riley	12.3, 12.7	2	2023
Andrina Harper Patterson	Genesis Lynea	12.5, 13.2–13.3	3	2023–2024
Henry Baptiste	Solomon Israel	12.6-12.7	2	2023
Rose Dalton	Cara Theobold	12.6-12.7	2	2023
David Cartwright	Patrick Kennedy	12.6-12.7	2	2023
Zoe Ainsworth	Taj Atwal	13.5–13.6	2	2024
DI Mervin Wilson	Don Gilet	14.0-	16	2024-
Brianna Clemetson	Joy Richardson	14.0, 14.2, 14.7	3	2024-2025
Officer Sebastian Rose	Shaquille Ali-Yebuah	14.2-	14	2025-
Dorna Bray	Judith Jacob	14.3, 14.7	2	2025
Roy Palmer	Gerard Horan	14.6-14.7	2	2025
Sterling Fox	Trieve Blackwood-Cambridge	14.6-14.7, 15.6	3	2025, 2026
Sergeant Mattie Fletcher	Catherine Garton	15.1-	8	2026-
Solomon Clarke	Daniel Ward	15.1-15.2, 15.6, 15.8	4	2026
Anton Busette	Gary Wilmot	15.2, 15.7	2	2026
Eloise Clarke	Avah Cotterell	15.7-15.8	2	2026

† Episode count is as of episode 15.8

- Cast list is in chronological order of appearance (episode-wise) in the programme, and in the case of cast who began featuring in the programme at the same time, in credit order.
- Morven Christie, James Fox and Judith Jacob both featured in voice-only for their first appearances – episodes 3.1, 4.7 and 14.3, respectively.
- List consists of all main and recurring characters.

== Current characters ==
Characters currently starring in the programme, in standard credit order:

=== Detective Inspector Mervin Wilson ===
Mervin Wilson
- Death in Paradise character
- Portrayed by: Don Gilet
- Duration: 2024–
- First appearance: 2024 Christmas special
- Last appearance: Current
In-universe information
- Occupation: Detective Inspector
- Mother: Dorna Bray (deceased)

Mervin Wilson is a DI from London, who makes his first appearance in the 2024 Christmas special when he is recruited by Commissioner Patterson to lead a murder investigation while he was vacating on Saint Marie. He later reveals that he came to the island primarily because he found out that Dorna Bray - his biological mother whom he never met - lives on the island and came hoping to reconnect, though he is informed that she died a few months prior in an apparent boating accident. While he originally had no intentions of remaining on the island, he agrees to stay on a short-term contract after he uncovers evidence that his mother's death may have not been accidental but in fact murder.

Mervin initially doesn't mesh well with the team, with his curt and occasionally rude manner clashing with the others (particularly Darlene). But he warms to the island over time and gains the team's respect after proving himself to be a more than capable DI at solving various complex cases. He reveals during a conversation with Naomi during Series 14, Episode 5, that he was previously engaged to a woman back in the UK, but their relationship ended due to the intense demands of his DI role. In Series 14, Episode 7, he successfully solves his mother's murder and arrests the guilty party. While he once again plans on leaving the island following this, he chooses to once again remain after he is informed by Patterson that he has a brother who lives on the island.

=== Detective Sergeant Naomi Thomas ===
Naomi Thomas
- Death in Paradise character
- Portrayed by: Shantol Jackson
- Duration: 2022–
- First appearance: Series 11, Episode 1
- Last appearance: Current
In-universe information
- Occupation: Sergeant (series 11); Detective Sergeant (series 11–present)

Sergeant Naomi Thomas joins the Saint Marie Police Force at the start of Series 11 as JP's replacement. She was born on Saint Barnabas, a neighbouring island to Saint Marie, and enrolled in the police force there where she achieved her sergeant status. However, due to the island's small size and population, Naomi had never worked on a homicide case before joining the force at Saint Marie. She is shown to be very dedicated to her job, a trait that sometimes got in the way of her professionalism, but nevertheless her enthusiasm for the job impresses her fellow officers.

Following Florence's departure from the show midway through series 11, Naomi shows her interest in becoming the new Detective Sergeant, and following discussions with DI Neville Parker and the Commissioner, she is accepted and becomes the new DS.

=== Officer Sebastian Rose ===
Sebastian Rose
- Death in Paradise character
- Duration: 2025–
- First appearance: Series 14, Episode 2
- Last appearance: Current
In-universe information
- Occupation: Police Officer

== Supporting characters ==
=== Catherine Bordey ===
Catherine Bordey
- Death in Paradise character
- Portrayed by: Élizabeth Bourgine
- Duration: 2011–
- First appearance: Series 1, Episode 2
- Last appearance: Current
In-universe information
- Occupation: Landlady; Bar Owner/Waitress; Mayor of Honoré (6.8-present)
- Spouse: Marlon Croft (divorced)
- Daughters: Camille Bordey
- Grandchildren: Unknown

Camille's French mother and owner of a bar where the police team often chat about the case over a drink. She makes a particularly good cup of tea, according to DI Richard Poole, although generally their relationship with each other is strained because of his prejudice toward the French. She raised Camille as a single mother and is therefore very close to her. She does not react badly when Camille confirms she is thinking of leaving; in fact, she supports Camille and respects her choices, urging her to do whatever makes her happy. When Camille leaves, she has a spare room and lets the homeless JP stay in it when Goodman finds out he has nowhere to live and is sleeping in the police cells. In Series 5 Episode 5, JP tells Catherine that he is in love with his high school crush, Rosey Fabrice, but was told by Dwayne not to admit this. This angers Catherine, who confronts Dwayne to encourage JP to be open with Rosey.

Following the resignation of Mayor Joseph Richards in a scandal at the end of Series 6, Episode 1, Catherine decides to stand as a candidate in the mayoral election to replace him. She is elected in Series 6, Episode 8 after one of the other candidates is murdered due to an old vendetta and the other is convinced to stand down from the election by the police team after they discover his hypocritical actions. During the investigation, it is strongly implied that the killers attempted to frame Catherine for the murder, but this part of the plan fails as none of the team is able to believe that Catherine would commit murder.

In Series 10, Episodes 5–6, Catherine is assaulted by an attacker owing to her links to an ongoing case, which causes her to be admitted to hospital with a serious head trauma. Her daughter Camille returns to the island to visit her and help solve the case. Catherine's condition worsens after a bleed in her brain is discovered and she subsequently requires surgery to prevent her from dying. Despite Camille fearing the worst, Catherine makes a full recovery and she and Camille decide to go away for a few weeks together to make up for Camille not visiting her since she left the island.

In Series 12, Episode 8, it is revealed that Catherine is going to be a grandmother, as Camille and her boyfriend are expecting a baby.

=== Commissioner Selwyn Patterson ===
Selwyn Patterson
- Death in Paradise character
- Portrayed by: Don Warrington
- Duration: 2011–
- First appearance: Series 1, Episode 1
- Last appearance: Current
In-universe information
- Occupation: Commissioner
- Wife: Maggie Harper (divorced)
- Daughters: Andrina Harper
- Nephews: Darcus Patterson
- Nieces: Ruby Patterson

The island's police commissioner, who has risen through the ranks to become Saint Marie's top policeman, in charge of staffing. Though mainly operating in the background in most episodes, Patterson advises the team on cases of particular difficulty, or which involve political or social interest where the island's most notable figures are involved. This ranges from asking Poole to be cautious about accusing a man with a particular reputation on the island to asking Poole not to disprove the idea that a notorious pirate hid his treasure on the island. It was revealed in Series 3, Episode 3, that he had in fact broken the law once during his life, that being when he was jailed for a day over parking fines many years ago. Initially more apparently focused on political implications over individuals, such as being angered at Poole when a suspect was stabbed in the back while in Poole's custody because of the implications for public perception, he has shown signs of softening over time, such as allowing an incident where Officer Myers told a journalist that the commissioner blundered around like an old goat to be dismissed as a significant misquote, and warmly welcoming DI Jack Mooney to the island after Humphrey Goodman requests reassignment. He developed a close friendship with DI Mooney, though his relationship with DI Neville Parker is much more complicated due to the latter's more eccentric behaviours and "chaotic" methods. However, this relationship also improves over time as the commissioner notices his effectiveness and efforts to adapt. He also has a habit of appearing surprisingly quietly at the station, usually startling the detective pondering the case.

Patterson visibly considers police work to be primarily in service of the island and its people. In some early cases he would pressure the detectives to avoid damaging the island's image or causing stress to individuals who appear innocent when the angle of the investigation appears to be poorly evidenced, rather than pursuing results at all costs. Over time, however, he has adopted a more relaxed attitude in this regard, content to let the detectives follow the evidence and simply offering advice rather than attempting to 'nudge' the investigation. He is also a member of many clubs and organisations, and appears to know many people on the island personally, maintaining friendly relationships rather than using his position of power. He also visibly takes any past failures of his police work and unresolved investigations very seriously and personally, struggling to accept that a new investigation may yield better results. However, he is always willing to accept new evidence, such as the reopening of an eight-year-old murder case where it has just been revealed that the woman arrested had an alibi that went unconfirmed because her companion was visiting on holiday and left before he could be questioned, and is visibly relieved when such matters are finally resolved and the true guilty party exposed.

Very little is known throughout the show about Patterson's personal or family life until in Series 11, Episode 8, when his ex-wife, Maggie, appears on the island, who had left him years prior due to the demands of her profession as a journalist. It is revealed that although he has had other partners since, he has never remarried. Despite remaining separated for a long time, it appears they still have feelings for each other, and it is revealed at the end that her daughter, Andrina, whom he never met until now, is also his daughter. He meets Andrina in the following series and the two slowly begin to connect.

In Series 14, Episode 1, Patterson is informed that due to budget cuts and boardroom changes, his position as Commissioner on the island is being discontinued, much to his and the team's dismay. While the decision is eventually reversed by the series' end and he is offered his job back, he declines due to it becoming clear that the board no longer valued him the same as before. He later changes his mind during the 2025 Christmas special, and returns to the island as Commissioner in Series 15, Episode 1.

== Past characters ==
Characters who have previously starred in a main role in the programme, in standard credit order:

=== Detective Inspector Richard Poole ===
Richard Poole
- Death in Paradise character
- Portrayed by: Ben Miller
- Duration: 2011–2014, 2021
- First appearance: Series 1, Episode 1 (regular); Series 10, Episode 6 (guest)
- Last appearance: Series 3, Episode 1 (regular); Series 10, Episode 6 (guest)
In-universe information
- Occupation: Detective Inspector

A British inspector assigned to the island to investigate the previous inspector's murder, Poole was instructed to remain on the island as the new police detective, much to his dismay. Despite his distaste for the island and inexperience with tropical weather – to the point where he continues to wear his old suits and drinks almost nothing but tea – he often showed a useful knack for making deductive leaps based on minimal information and apparently random events, and favoured making arrests by addressing all the suspects at once before identifying the killer. In series 2 he grew slightly more relaxed and recommended Fidel for his sergeant's exam. Poole briefly returns to London at the end of Episode 2, but in spite of his distaste for Saint Marie, he chooses to return. Poole is murdered in the first episode of Series 3, at an on-island reunion of Cambridge university classmates, by Helen Reid, when he threatened to expose her identity theft. He was replaced by DI Humphrey Goodman.

Poole makes a brief guest cameo in Series 10, Episode 6 when Camille returns to the island briefly to help on a case and due to her mother Catherine being admitted to hospital after being attacked. He encourages her to spend more time with Catherine before disappearing, being simply a figment of Camille's mind.

=== Detective Sergeant Camille Bordey ===
Camille Bordey
- Death in Paradise character
- Portrayed by: Sara Martins
- Duration: 2011–2015, 2021, 2024
- First appearance: Series 1, Episode 1 (regular); Series 10, Episode 5 (guest)
- Last appearance: Series 4, Episode 4 (regular); Series 13, Episode 1 (guest)
In-universe information
- Occupation: Detective Sergeant
- Father: Marlon Croft
- Mother: Catherine Bordey
- Children: 1

A former undercover investigator, she was assigned as Detective Sergeant because her cover was blown when she was arrested during Poole's first investigation. She was the team's best investigator after Poole, often handling the computer work. Initially, she and Poole did not get along at all as a result of a culture clash, but over time the two began to get along better and made a good team, and their friendship even showed hints of romance. When Poole briefly left the island, she admitted she admired him considerably, and was pleased when he chose to return. His murder in the opening scenes of Series 3 devastated her and she was unsure about his successor, DI Humphrey Goodman, although she warmed to him over time. She was then offered an undercover job in Paris in Series 4, and she decided to leave. As she left, she kissed Humphrey despite not previously expressing emotions for him, although he had for her.

Her mother Catherine owns a popular local bar. Her father, Marlon Croft, who lives in the neighboring island of St. Lucia, reappears in Series 3, Episode 5, protecting his goddaughter, who's implicated in a case. After suspecting him, Camille starts reconciling with him.

In Series 10, Episode 6, Camille returns to the island after Commissioner Patterson contacted her to return to help on a case, and due to her mother being admitted to hospital after being attacked. She successfully helps the team solve the case and, following advice given to her after conversing with a memory of DI Richard Poole, decides to spend a few weeks away with Catherine to make up for not visiting her since leaving the island, after which she returned to her role in Paris.

In Series 12, Episode 8, Catherine reveals that Camille and her boyfriend are expecting a baby back in Paris. She returns for a guest appearance via video call in Series 13, Episode 1, where she gives birth and later offers advise to Neville Parker.

=== Officer Dwayne Myers ===
Dwayne Myers
- Death in Paradise character
- Portrayed by: Danny John-Jules
- Duration: 2011–2018, 2021, 2024
- First appearance: Series 1, Episode 1 (first run); Christmas Special 2021 (guest); Series 13, Episode 6 (second run)
- Last appearance: Series 7, Episode 8 (first run); Christmas Special 2021 (guest); Christmas Special 2024 (second run)
In-universe information
- Occupation: Officer (series 1–7, 13–2024 Christmas Special); Retired officer (2021 Christmas Special)
- Father: Nelson Myers
- Aunts: Lilibeth; Jean

Dwayne was the longest-standing officer of the Saint Marie police force, but utterly lacked ambition, hence he's never became a sergeant. He has complete faith in his seniors and perhaps too good an understanding of the criminal world on the island. Dwayne often uses unlawful means to get his job done, and has an eye for the ladies, sometimes getting distracted when on the job. He is the go-to man for any investigations into the shadier aspects of Saint Marie. It is revealed he has a sister, who locked him in a trunk for three hours when he was five years old; this led to Dwayne developing a secret fear of the dark. His parents divorced when he was very young and his father abandoned him after a few months of weekend visits, leaving Dwayne to grow up on his own.

Following DS Camille Bordey's departure halfway through Series 4, Dwayne became the last remaining original team member, apart from Commissioner Selwyn Patterson. That same episode, young Officer JP Hooper joined the team, with Dwayne taking him under his wing and mentoring him to become a good officer. Dwayne later leaves Saint Marie and the team after the end of Series 7. It's mentioned by Jack Mooney and JP at the start of Series 8 that Dwayne had gone on a voyage with his father, Nelson, with whom he had since become reconciled.

Dwayne makes a guest appearance in the Christmas special broadcast in 2021, where he returned to the island for Christmas. He subsequently helps out the team on a case after the force is left short staffed, after which he leaves the island for London to visit his now ill father.

Following Officer Marlon Price's departure from the island, Dwayne return to the Police force permanently in Series 13, Episode 6, following a request from the Commissioner. He later reveals that the other and main reason he returned to Saint Marie was due to his father being close to death and thus wishing to spend his last days on the island.

In the 2024 special, he tells Nelson he is going to hand in his resignation to spend time with him back home.

=== Sergeant Fidel Best ===
Fidel Best
- Death in Paradise character
- Portrayed by: Gary Carr
- Duration: 2011–2014
- First appearance: Series 1, Episode 1
- Last appearance: Series 3, Episode 8
In-universe information
- Occupation: Officer (series 1–2); Sergeant (series 2–3)
- Wife: Juliette Best
- Daughters: Rosie Best

Young and hard-working, Fidel is married to a woman called Juliette and has a daughter named Rosie who was born in the Series 1 finale. He is put forward for his sergeant's exams by DI Richard Poole, in series 2, in recognition of his hard work. He passes them, and officially becomes a sergeant. Fidel often gets stressed and sticks to protocol, whereas Dwayne is the complete opposite. Nevertheless, the two were great friends.

At the start of series 4, in a phone call between him and Dwayne (his voice does not feature; the conversation is shown from Dwayne's end), it is revealed that he has been promoted and is now working on the neighbouring island of St. Lucia.

=== Detective Inspector Humphrey Goodman ===
Humphrey Goodman
- Death in Paradise character
- Portrayed by: Kris Marshall
- Duration: 2014–2017
- First appearance: Series 3, Episode 1
- Last appearance: Series 6, Episode 6
In-universe information
- Occupation: Detective Inspector
- Father: Martin Goodman
- Wife: Sally Goodman (divorced); Martha Lloyd (fianceé)
- Aunts: Mary Goodman

Humphrey Goodman is a Police Detective from London who is assigned to Saint Marie after the murder of D.I. Richard Poole at the start of Series 3. Clues from Poole's investigation helped Goodman reveal the motive and the killer's identity, with Goodman commenting that Poole had essentially "solved his own murder." Goodman stayed on in Saint Marie after his wife Sally announced she would not be joining him on the Caribbean island. He became the chief inspector on the island, and took to Poole's old habit of announcing the murderer in front of all the suspects and his police team. Though he is very clumsy, often forgetting things or finding himself with nothing to take notes on, he has a knack at being able to solve murders instantly, looking at the meaning of small details, much like his predecessor. He embraced Caribbean life much more than Poole did, often dressing casually when off-duty and regularly had alcohol to drink at Catherine's bar, instead of always dressing in a full suit and drinking nothing but tea like Poole.

After declining to get back together with his ex-wife Sally at the end of Series 3, he developed feelings for his detective sergeant, Camille Bordey, often coming close to revealing his feelings for her. He tried to stop her leaving when she was offered a new job in Paris, but ultimately conceded, and the two shared a brief kiss just as she left the island. Her successor, DS Florence Cassell, also got along great with Goodman, often sharing jokes and they dedicate a drink to Camille after their first solved case. He would later develop romantic feelings for Martha Lloyd, a British tourist, and they kissed at the start of series 6. She leaves the island in Episode 4 to start her dream job in London, but after a case takes Humphrey to London he meets up with her and they reconcile. After solving the case, he decides to resign as DI on Saint Marie to remain with Martha in London. He was replaced by DI Jack Mooney (Ardal O'Hanlon).

Humphrey Goodman and Martha also appear in the spin-off series, Beyond Paradise, which has aired since February 2023.

=== Detective Sergeant Florence Cassell ===
Florence Cassell
- Death in Paradise character
- Portrayed by: Joséphine Jobert
- Duration: 2015–2019, 2021–2022, 2024
- First appearance: Series 4, Episode 1 (first run); Series 10, Episode 1 (second run); Series 13, Episode 6 (recurring)
- Last appearance: Series 8, Episode 6 (first run); Series 11, Episode 4 (second run); Series 13 Episode 8 (recurring)
In-universe information
- Occupation: Sergeant (Series 4); Detective Sergeant (Series 4–8, 10–11)
- Brothers: 5 unnamed brothers

At the age of 27, Cassell joins the team to replace Fidel as Sergeant at the start of Series 4, and later is promoted to Detective Sergeant when Camille Bordey leaves midway through the series. She works efficiently and gets along with all the team, establishing a strong connection with Goodman when she is promoted. She is sent a note by Camille in order to know how to 'control' Goodman, and they both drink to Camille after she helps solve her first case as Detective Sergeant. She is very intelligent and always observes suspects carefully for any clues. In the team's visit to the UK, Cassell proved more willing to explore little details of life in Britain than Myers, although she still found the Guinness beer too thick for her taste.

In Series 8, Florence is revealed to be in a romantic relationship with Patrice, a new character. He proposed to her in the third episode and they became engaged. However, after one of Patrice's friends was arrested for murder in the fifth episode, Cassell overheard him talking to someone on the phone about the crime, and followed him to an old boathouse, where she was shot at the end of the episode. At the beginning of episode 6, she was able to call JP and get the rest of the team there in time to get her to the hospital, but soon after they discovered Patrice had been shot dead in the boathouse - devastating Florence. The subsequent investigation confirmed that Patrice's friend had been psychologically manipulated into committing the previous murder so that the real guilty party would receive a major inheritance, clearing Patrice and his friend of wrongdoing. After talking with Jack about how he coped with the death of his wife, Florence decides to leave Saint Marie and move to Martinique with relatives to get away from the memories of Patrice, but Jack and the others assure her that her spot on the team would be open if she ever decided to come back.

In Series 10, two years on from Patrice's death, Florence returns to the island after her successor, Madeline Dumas, left to take a job opportunity in Paris, leaving the island short-staffed and prompting the Commissioner to ask for her help. She was at first unsure of the new DI, Neville Parker, but she soon warms to him and helps him embrace the Caribbean lifestyle more. At one point, Neville revealed his romantic feelings for her, but she turns him down due to her wanting to remain just friends. In the following series, Florence is offered an undercover police job in Jamaica and, despite some hesitancy due to the memory of Patrice still being vivid, she was willing to accept the new role and leave the island for a second time. However, after being held at gunpoint by Mafia Boss Miranda Priestley as part of her undercover role to be accepted, Florence shot her in the arm and had to immediately leave the island under witness protection in Series 11, Episode 4, saying farewell to her colleagues.

2 years later, Florence's witness protection is terminated - with it being revealed she was housed in the neighbouring island of St. Augustine. As such, she reappears in Series 13, Episode 7, to assist the team and Neville on a complex case across both islands. In the following episode, with Neville due to leave to go travelling, Florence reveals to him that during her time in witness protection she came to realise that she did have romantic feelings for him after all, and states her desire to be with him. While Neville initially turns this down, he changes his mind, and the two depart St. Marie to go travelling together - finally becoming a couple.

=== Sergeant JP Hooper ===
JP Hooper
- Death in Paradise character
- Portrayed by: Tobi Bakare
- Duration: 2015–2021, 2024, 2025
- First appearance: Series 4, Episode 5 (regular); Series 13, Episode 5 (guest)
- Last appearance: Series 10, Episode 8 (regular); Series 14, Episode 1 (guest)
In-universe information
- Occupation: Officer (series 4–9); Sergeant (series 9–10)
- Wife: Rosey Fabrice
- Daughters: Molly & Bethany
- First cousins: Eddie

Officer Jean Peirre "JP" Hooper joins the team as a new police officer in Series 4, Episode 5, when Florence Cassell is promoted. He is 21, and the youngest member of the team. He is taken under the wing of Dwayne – a police officer who Hooper says he heard all about at police training college. He initially ended up watering the plants on his first day, because of a lack of things to do. He slept in the police cells temporarily because he could not find a place to live. Goodman found him one night, amidst much screaming and shock; Catherine, who had a spare room after Camille's departure, invited him to stay with her, an offer JP enthusiastically took up. He has a brother, who, when JP was three years old, pushed him into a swimming pool, leading to JP developing a fear of water. In series five he meets Rosey Fabrice (a girl who was in the year above him in school and he had a crush on) when she is a suspect in a murder during a charity fashion show. They soon begin dating and fall in love. Eventually, after being in a relationship for several months, JP proposes to Rosey and she gladly accepts. In the final episode of Series 5, JP and Rosey get married.

In the first episode of series eight, he reveals his initials stand for Jean Pierre, when introducing himself to Florence's boyfriend, whom he mistakes for Dwayne's replacement. When Officer Ruby Patterson joined the team on series 8 episode 2, he was annoyed by her being distracted while on duty, but he has a close friendship with her. On series 9 episode 6, JP learns that his wife, Rosey is pregnant, which she told him about on their wedding anniversary. However, JP hesitated, upsetting Rosey, who kicked him out the house and he spend a night at the police station cells, and was found by Ruby the next morning. JP told Ruby about Rosey's pregnancy and Ruby advises him and he was happy to become a father. He then learns that Rosey is pregnant with twins. In the final episode of Series 9, he takes and passes his Sergeant's exams.

During the course of Series 10 he takes trainee officer Marlon Pryce under his wing and his wife Rosey gives birth to twin girls; Molly and Bethany. His impressive leadership leads to the police board offering JP a head position in the police training scheme in Jamaica, an offer which JP accepts and he leaves Saint Marie with his family to start a new life. JP makes a guest appearance in Series 13, Episode 5, where he and the commissioner travel to Jamaica to ensure that the soon-to-be departing Marlon gets a job at the police force there in order to continue his career. He appears again in Series 14, Episode 1, to inform Commissioner Patterson that due to budget cuts he is facing redundancy.

=== Detective Inspector Jack Mooney ===
Jack Mooney
- Death in Paradise character
- Portrayed by: Ardal O'Hanlon
- Duration: 2017–2020
- First appearance: Series 6, Episode 5
- Last appearance: Series 9, Episode 4
In-universe information
- Occupation: Detective Inspector
- Siblings: Bridget Mooney; Eileen Mooney
- Wife: Kathleen O'Brian Mooney (deceased)
- Daughters: Siobhan Mooney
- Uncles: Terence; Ray; Paul; Kenny

A police detective inspector from London, Jack Mooney is a recent widower, his wife having died from a long illness a month prior to his first appearance, although he gives the impression that it was longer when talking with others so that people won't feel too sorry for him. Jack meets D.I. Humphrey Goodman, D.S. Florence Cassell and Officer Dwayne Myers from Saint Marie, acting as their London liaison when a case requires them to travel to London to track their suspects. After solving the case, Humphrey resigned from Saint Marie Police to stay in London to be with his girlfriend, Martha Lloyd, but nominates Jack as his successor as Saint Marie's new Detective Inspector. Initially assuming that this is just a holiday of a few weeks, Jack goes to Saint Marie with his daughter, Siobhan. While still just officially on holiday, Mooney assists the team in resolving a re-opened investigation into the death of a newspaper editor eight years ago, along with another case that exposed those responsible for murdering one of the candidates in the recent mayoral election. After solving the second case, he decides to accept an offer from Commissioner Patterson to stay on the island as detective permanently, and he and Siobhan start a new life on the island to move on from his wife's death.

When Siobhan left to go back the UK to attend university, Jack missed her dearly but remained focussed on his job and embraced the Caribbean lifestyle enthusiastically. Jack supported Florence when her fiancé Patrice was murdered and mentioned how he had to go through his wife's death, and accepts Florence's decision to leave St. Marie. When Jack video calls Siobhan, he was shocked when she told him that her boyfriend has been cheating on her. He decided to return to the UK to support her but changed his mind as he was still solving a current murder case. Jack was delighted when Commissioner Patterson arranged for Siobhan to come back to St Marie to see him.

In the first episode of series 9, Jack starts a romantic relationship with English traveller Anna, but was unsure if he was ready to move on from his late wife. Anna asked him to travel the world with her, but he was unsure if he wanted to leave the island. After some deliberation, Jack tells Anna that he won't be travelling with her, but agrees to wait for her in London, her final destination. Jack departs St. Marie with Siobhan, finally ready to face the memory of his late wife. He was replaced by DI Neville Parker.

Jack reappears in the spin-off show Return to Paradise, which began airing in October 2024. He is shown to still be working as a DI for the London Metropolitan Police, and is the boss of the series' main character Mackenzie Clark.

=== Officer Ruby Patterson ===
Ruby Patterson
- Death in Paradise character
- Portrayed by: Shyko Amos
- Duration: 2019–2020
- First appearance: Series 8, Episode 2
- Last appearance: Series 9, Episode 8
In-universe information
- Occupation: Officer
- Brothers: Darcus Patterson
- Uncles: Selwyn Patterson
- Aunts: Gardenia
- First cousins: Andrina Harper

A recent graduated officer and Commissioner Patterson's niece, who replaces Officer Dwayne Myers, Ruby Patterson joins the team in Series 8, Episode 2. She's happy and excited when she has her first murder case with her new colleagues. Her colleague, Officer JP Hooper is at first annoyed at her behaviour during duty, but later came to tolerate her enthusiasm and genuine desire to do the job. Ruby also helps JP and offered him advice after he found out his wife, Rosey Fabrice was pregnant. Ruby leaves the team after Series 9, with Commissioner Patterson stating in Series 10, Episode 1 that Madeleine had secured Ruby a secondment to Paris, one which Ruby later indicates will remain "indefinite".

=== Detective Sergeant Madeleine Dumas ===
Madeleine Dumas
- Death in Paradise character
- Portrayed by: Aude Legastelois-Bidé
- Duration: 2019-2020
- First appearance: Series 8, Episode 7
- Last appearance: Series 9, Episode 8
In-universe information
- Occupation: Detective Sergeant

A detective sergeant from France, replacing DS Florence Cassell. Madeline initially came to the island as an officer of Internal Affairs to investigate Florence's recent shooting and assess Mooney's competence as a detective, but after witnessing him in action, she affirmed that what happened to Florence wasn't his fault and accepted an offer to remain on the island as permanent DS. She leaves the island after Series 9, with Commissioner Patterson mentioning in Series 10, Episode 1 that she left Saint Marie after accepting a new position in Paris, where she also arranged for a secondment for Ruby.

=== Officer Marlon Pryce ===
Marlon Pryce
- Death in Paradise character
- Portrayed by: Tahj Miles
- Duration: 2021–2024
- First appearance: Series 10, Episode 2
- Last appearance: Series 13, Episode 5
In-universe information
- Occupation: Trainee Officer (Series 10); Officer (Series 11–13)
- Sisters: Jocelyn

Formerly a youth offender, Marlon joins the Saint Marie Police Force in order to avoid facing going to court and prison as a consequence for a lifetime of bad behaviour. Upon his arrival, JP is tasked with taking Marlon under his wing.

Despite initially proving a challenge for JP, the two men soon form a good relationship when JP takes Marlon in after finding out he was sleeping on the streets. Their good relationship is further shown when JP steps in to protect Marlon following an incident with one of the suspects and offers to take the blame for his actions, in order to help him avoid going to prison. By the end of Series 10 with JP set to leave the island, Marlon has become committed to reforming his character and making something of his life, aiming to be as a good a police officer as JP.

By the start of Series 11, Marlon has been promoted to Officer and has continued to improve in his role as Officer. Against the advice of the Commissioner, Marlon applies and takes his Sergeant exams in Series 12. He fails them and is given a dressing down by the commissioner for taking them prematurely, but nevertheless remains committed to his role. In Series 13, Episode 5, Marlon decides to leave Saint Marie to take care of his younger sister, Jocelyn, after she is offered a scholarship at a school in Jamaica. The commissioner and JP spoke with the Jamaican police commissioner to ensure that he would be offered a role in the police force over there, allowing Marlon to continue his career as a police officer.

=== Detective Inspector Neville Parker ===
Neville Parker
- Death in Paradise character
- Portrayed by: Ralf Little
- Duration: 2020–2024
- First appearance: Series 9, Episode 5
- Last appearance: Series 13, Episode 8
In-universe information
- Occupation: Detective Inspector
- Mother: Melanie Parker
- Sisters: Izzy Parker
- Nephews: Arthur

DI Neville Parker is from Manchester in the UK and became the new Honore Police inspector after the departure of DI Jack Mooney. He initially hates everything on the island, and has severe allergies, his main allergy being mosquito bites. After he checked through the crime scene of his first murder case, he plans on catching another plane back to the UK, but his flight was cancelled by Commissioner Patterson. Neville moves into the shack, but in the middle of the night, he couldn't stand the mosquitoes, and checks into a hotel. After solving his first case, Neville collapses and is declared unfit to travel for a month. He moves back into the shack as the police budget wouldn't let him remain in the hotel. After solving a murder case in Episode 8, he plans on flying back home, but a talk with a blind actress about her attempt to face the challenges of her condition prompted Parker to change his mind and decide to stay as inspector permanently.

At the start of series 10 he has continued to struggle to adapt to life on the island, but the returning DS Florence Cassell helps him embrace Caribbean life more, and by the end of the series he warms to the island lifestyle and later develops feelings for Florence. He subsequently reveals to Florence how he feels at the start of Series 11, but despite Florence expressing her admiration and care for Neville, tells him she wishes to remain just friends and later leaves the island halfway through the series.

In the 2022 Christmas Special, Neville, having briefly tried online dating, meets Sophie Chambers, an English traveller also from Manchester who is staying on the island for a few weeks. The two bond and eventually begin a relationship by the start of Series 12. However, in Episode 6, Neville is arrested, and later charged, for the murder of David Cartwright, a suspect on a previous case who was found dead in his hotel room after Neville confronted him, due to Neville not having enough evidence to arrest him. Despite being eventually cleared of any wrongdoing, it's revealed that it was Sophie who was behind his framing; Sophie blames Neville for the suicide of her sister in prison, who Neville arrested and charged with murder on a case back in Manchester in 2018, and came to the island, under a fake name, to frame him as an act of revenge. Shaken by this revelation, Neville informs Commissioner Patterson that he intends to leave the island in the Series 12 finale. However, after solving the case and gaining closure after visiting Sophie in prison, he agrees to stay.

In Series 13, Neville, following encouragement from his mother and others, decides not to give up on finding a romantic partner. After briefly reuniting with his ex Zoe, Neville decides to leave Saint Marie to go travelling in order to try and find someone. However, in the series finale, Florence returns to the island after her witness protection is terminated - with her revealing to Neville that during her time away she came to realise she now felt the same way towards Neville, and as such asks to be with him. While Neville initially turns her down, after an intervention by the others, he agrees and the two depart the island together to go travelling - finally becoming a couple.

=== Officer Darlene Curtis ===
Darlene Curtis
- Death in Paradise character
- Portrayed by: Ginny Holder
- Duration: 2018, 2022–2025
- First appearance: Series 7, Episode 3 (first run); Series 11, Episode 5 (second run)
- Last appearance: Series 7, Episode 7 (first run); 2025 Christmas special (second run)
In-universe information
- Occupation: Civilian consultant (Series 11); Trainee Officer (Series 12); Officer (Series 13-14)

Darlene first appeared in Series 7 as a love interest to Officer Dwayne Myers. The two had a sometimes turbulent but nevertheless happy relationship, though following Dwayne's departure from the island at the end of the series, it's assumed their relationship ended and Darlene makes no appearances for the next few series.

Darlene returns to the show mid-way through Series 11, and is subsequently offered a role on the team by Commissioner Patterson in a civilian capacity following Florence's departure from the force. She proves to be a good addition to the team, and at the end of the 2022 Christmas special, she reveals that she has applied for Police Officer training so she can join the team in an official capacity. After Marlon Pryce transfers off the island, Darlene becomes the senior officer when new recruit Sebastian Rose is hired. After appearing only through video call during the 2025 Christmas special, it's revealed in Series 15, Episode 1, that Darlene has left the team in order to look after her Aunt on the neighbouring island of Montserrat. She was replaced by Mattie Fletcher.

== Recurring characters ==
Characters who have featured in more than one episode of the programme, yet are not part of the main cast, in chronological order of appearance:

- Harry the Lizard: (Series 1–present, various episodes) The animated companion to all the lead detectives, he lives at the house and likes mashed-up fruit and bugs. He is often asked rhetorical questions by the detectives when they are pondering details of a case or just talking about other matters.
- Aidan Miles (Adrian Dunbar): (Series 1, Episodes 7–8) A possible love interest for Catherine Bordey, until DI Richard Poole exposed him as a murderer in the Series 1 finale. He was in hiding on the island, and his name was in a puzzle compiled by his victim, hence revealing his crime.
- Sally Goodman (Morven Christie): (Series 3, Episode 1 (voice only) & Episode 8) DI Goodman's wife who was originally planning to join her husband on Saint Marie, but confirmed by voicemail in the series 3 premiere that she was leaving him, wished for a divorce and would not join him. In the series 3 finale, she arrived on the island asking Humphrey to come back to her, but he declined, feeling that she had already proven that she didn't have any faith in their relationship by not coming to the island with him in the first place. She subsequently leaves heartbroken. In Series 4, Episode 8, during a conversation between Humphrey and his father, Martin Goodman, it was revealed that Sally is now engaged to a lawyer called Derek Grundy, and at an event also attended by Humphrey's parents she continually asked after Humphrey.
- Martin Goodman QC (James Fox): (Series 4, Episode 7 (voice only) & Episode 8) DI Goodman's father who came to Saint Marie in order to persuade Humphrey to return home, due to him being unimpressed with Humphrey's career and life choice, but also to get back together with his former wife, Sally. It's implied that he and Goodman have had a love-hate relationship beforehand, shown by the way Humphrey ignores his calls in Episode 7. Martin eventually concedes that Humphrey is good at his job, after he witnessed his son solve a baffling murder case, and tells him he is proud of him. He subsequently returns to the UK at the end of the episode.
- Rosey Hooper (née Fabrice) (Fola Evans-Akingbola, Prisca Bakare): (Series 5 & Series 10, various episodes) Love interest of officer JP Hooper after he recognised her from school (she was in the year above him) and was a suspect in a murder at a charity fashion show. She recognised JP at the end and they had a drink together at Catherine's Bar. JP realise he's in love with Rosey and tells her how he feels. They soon began a relationship. Months later, JP proposed to Rosey and she accepts and they got married in the series finale. In Series 9, Episode 6, JP reveals that Rosey told him that she is pregnant, but JP hesitated, upsetting her, and kicked him out of the house. They make up and Rosey later calls JP and reveals to him that they're having twins. In Series 10, Rosey gives birth to twin girls, named Molly and Bethany. Rosey, JP, and their daughters later leave St. Marie to start a new life after Series 10 finale.
- Martha Lloyd (Sally Bretton): (Series 5–6, various episodes) A woman who worked in a shop that DI Goodman frequented when he lived in London. Martha was travelling around before starting a new job and one of her stops was on Saint Marie. While working a case, Humphrey almost ran Martha over and they recognized each other. They each had separated from their significant others and Humphrey eventually asked Martha on a date. Humphrey missed the date because he was talking JP through his pre-wedding jitters. When JP realized what had happened, he reached out to Martha and she and Humphrey reconnected. Martha continued to travel but would return to Saint Marie to see Humphrey and they started a relationship. During her frequent visits she stayed at Humphrey's shack. During one trip, Humphrey and Martha went on a romantic trip to Hotel Cecile and the staff mistook them as a newly-wed couple. Their romantic getaway ended when a murder occurred and Martha had to leave so that Humphrey could investigate. Martha eventually returned to London to start her dream job at a newly opened restaurant, but when another case took the team to London, Humphrey visited her and was inspired to stay and be with her.
- Nelson Myers (Ram John Holder): (Series 6–7, various episodes) Dwayne Myers' estranged father, who lives in London. When Dwayne goes to his aunt, Lilibeth's house to visit her, Nelson told Dwayne that Lilibeth is away and he's looking after her house. He later came to visit his son on Saint Marie, and by the time the eighth series begins, the two are on a worldwide cruise to work on rebuilding their relationship. Dwayne later reveals in the 2021 Christmas special that Nelson had fallen badly ill in the time since he left the island, with Dwayne later heading over there to visit him. In series 13, Dwayne mentions that Nelson is terminally ill and wishing to spend the rest of his days on Saint Marie.
- Siobhan Mooney (Grace Stone): (Series 6–9, various episodes) Siobhan is Jack Mooney's daughter. She lives in London with her father where he works as a police detective inspector, with her mother having died a month before he meets the rest of the Saint Marie team from a long illness. When D.I. Humphrey Goodman reassigned from Saint Marie Police, Jack replaces him and he and Siobhan move to Saint Marie. She leaves in the first episode of the next series to return to the UK for university. In the final episode of series 8, she reveals in a video call to her father that her boyfriend just left her after revealing that he had been cheating on her for the last few months, but when Mooney is unable to go back to the UK to offer her support to solve the current case, Commissioner Patterson arranges for Siobhan to be brought to Saint Marie in acknowledgement of her father's good work. On series 9 episode 4, Siobhan returns to St. Marie to see Jack and meets her father's new partner, Anna and they get along. After Jack solved his final case, he and Siobhan return to London.
- Patrice Campbell (Leemore Marrett Jr.): (Series 8, Episodes 1–6) Patrice is Florence Cassell's boyfriend and later fiancé. He and Florence started dating sometime between Series 7 and 8. They kept their relationship private initially as Florence was waiting for the right time to Patrice to meet her colleagues, though a misunderstanding with JP causes her to finally reveal their relationship to the others. In episode 3, Patrice and Florence went on a romantic trip and they come back to Saint Marie to announce that they're now engaged. Patrice later became involved in a murder when his friend became a suspect. Florence overheard him talking to an unknown person on the phone, telling him to meet at an empty barn. Florence follows him, but ended up getting shot. Minutes later, Jack and the team found Florence, and JP finds Patrice murdered. The subsequent investigation revealed that Patrice's friend was psychologically manipulated into committing the murder on behalf of someone else, clearing Patrice and his friend of wrongdoing, but Florence still departs Saint Marie to get away from the painful memories.
- Anna Masani (Nina Wadia): (Series 9, Episodes 1–4) Anna is Jack Mooney's love interest in Series 9. She recently separated from her husband and went on a tourist trip to Saint Marie. She reports to Jack that she witnessed a murder suspect. Jack invites her to salsa dancing and she accepts and they dance together. Despite Jack being unsure whether he was ready to move on from his deceased wife, they start a romantic relationship shortly afterwards. In Series 9, Episode 3, Anna asks Jack to travel the world with her, as she's leaving Saint Marie soon. Anna also meets Jack's daughter, Siobhan, and they get along instantly. In Episode 4, Jack tells Anna that he can't travel with her, but agrees to wait for her when she reaches London. Anna agrees and says goodbye to Jack before leaving Saint Marie.
- Izzy Parker (Kate O'Flynn): (Series 11, Episodes 5–7) Izzy is Neville Parker's sister who came to visit the island in Series 11, Episode 5. It's implied that she and Neville have had a love-hate relationship beforehand given how Neville speaks negatively of her prior to her arrival, and this is further exemplified when she holds a party at Neville's shack without his permission and makes a mess, much to his dismay. Eventually Izzy reveals that she came to the island due to her suspecting she is pregnant with her boyfriend Mike's child, but is unsure whether she wants to stay with him and get married. Izzy ultimately decides to keep the baby and marry Mike in Episode 7, thus leaving the island with she and Neville now on better terms. It's revealed (over the phone) in the 2022 Christmas special that Izzy gave birth to a boy named Arthur.
- Sophie Chambers / Rebecca Wanslow (Chelsea Edge): (2022 Christmas Special; Series 12, Episodes 1–2, 5–8) Sophie is Neville's love interest, first introduced in the 2022 Christmas Special. She is visiting the island for a few weeks and stays in Catherine's spare room. Though both she and Neville's romantic inexperience makes the initial meeting between the two difficult, the two later warm to each other and have Christmas dinner together. Sophie later asks Neville on a date in Series 12, Episode 1, and the two begin a relationship shortly afterwards. Sophie returns home in Episode 2, but returns in Episode 5. Following Neville's wrongful arrest for murder in Episode 6, it's revealed that she had framed Neville because she held him responsible for the suicide in prison of her sister, who had been arrested by Neville for murder in Manchester in 2018; she came to the island under a fake name (her real name is Rebecca Wanslow) to enact her plan. She is subsequently arrested and charged with David Cartwright's murder.
- Detective Constable Andrew Buckley (Kent Riley): (Series 12, Episodes 3 & 7) A former colleague of Neville Parker from the Manchester MET Police, he first appears in Episode 3 when Neville video calls him for assistance on a case. He later calls him again stating that there was something he wanted to tell Neville but couldn't at the time. It's revealed in Episode 7 that he had fled to the island after it was uncovered that he was under investigation for corruption on a previous case (involving Sophie's sister) that he and Neville worked on. He admits to taking bribes to cover his debts and is formally arrested and charged.
- Andrina Harper (Genesis Lynea): (Series 12–, various episodes) Andrina is Commissioner Selwyn Patterson's daughter whom he never knew existed until he was informed by his ex-wife Maggie during the Series 11 finale. Selwyn was initially hesitant to connect with her due to him having been out of her life for so long, but through encouragement from others the two met in Series 12, Episode 5 for the first time. Despite a shaky start, the two eventually got along, and Andrina travels back to the island in Series 13, Episode 2 to assist her father's recovery from a near fatal gunshot wound the previous episode.

== Further pages ==
- Death in Paradise
- List of Death in Paradise episodes
