= Sara Martins =

French actress (born 1977)

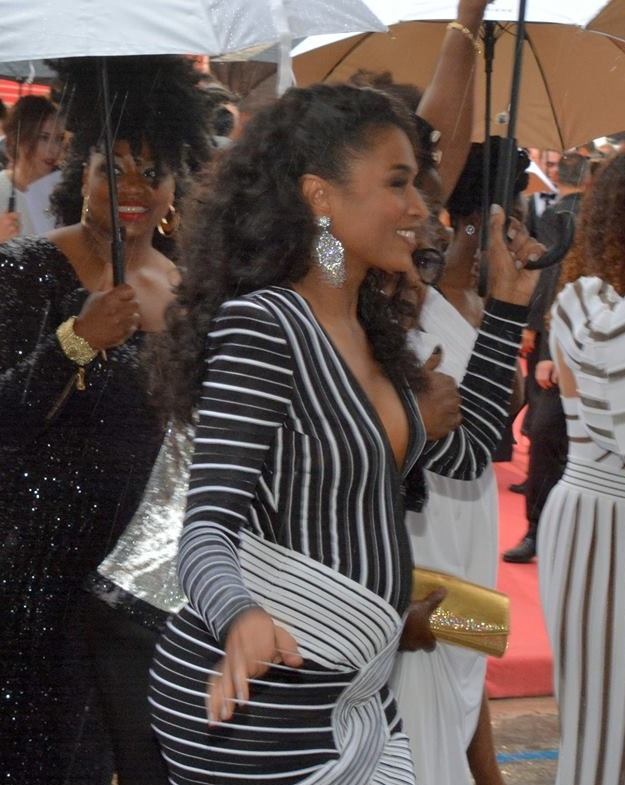
- Sara Martins at 2018 Cannes Film Festival
- Born: 19 August 1977 (age 49); Faro, Portugal
- Citizenship: Portugal • France
- Education: CNSAD
- Occupation: Actress
- Years active: 2000–present
- Known for: Death in Paradise

Sara Martins (born 19 August 1977) is a Portuguese-French actress. She is known in France for her roles on television and in film and theatre. She also appeared as Detective Sergeant Camille Bordey in the joint British-French crime comedy-drama Death in Paradise, filmed in Guadeloupe, a French overseas department. She left the show halfway through series 4 (January 2015). She later returned to Season 10 E6 to reprise her role temporarily, and again in Series 13 Episode 1, in a video call with Neville.

== Early life ==
Martins was born in Faro, in the Portuguese region of Algarve, and is of Cape Verdean descent. She moved to France at the age of three. She studied ballet in her youth and was the first person of African descent to join the Lyon Opera. She learned that she would be unable to advance to the Paris Opera, where the corps was expected to look alike and there were no other black dancers. Instead, she received her Baccalauréat with a theater option. After receiving a DEUG in law, at age 20 she studied at the École de théâtre Les Enfants Terribles in Paris. Then, she completed an acting degree at the French National Academy of Dramatic Arts. She learned English through U2 lyrics as a teenager.

== Career ==
=== Early work ===
Shortly after graduating from high school, Martins was hired by Roger Planchon for a local production of Le Radeau de la Méduse at the Théâtre National Populaire in Villeurbanne. She appeared in a play at the Young Vic in London called Le Costume (The Suit) and in a French-language production of David Mamet's Race.

Martins' television debut was in 2001, in the French police series Maigret and Police District. She appeared in the series Pigalle, la nuit as Fleur. While filming Death in Paradise, Martins worked on the French TV crime series Détectives in lead role of Nora Abadie.

She appeared in the film Paris, je t'aime (2006) in the segment Parc Monceau, the 17th arrondissement.

=== Death in Paradise ===
In April 2011, BBC One announced that Martins would appear in the crime comedy-drama Death in Paradise, co-produced with France Télévisions. The series was Martins' debut in both comedy and on British television. Martins did have experience playing a police officer. Death in Paradise premiered on 25 October 2011. Martins played Camille Bordey, a detective sergeant on the fictional Caribbean island of Saint-Marie. Camille and other local officers help British Detective Inspector Richard Poole (played by Ben Miller in the first two series) solve murders. During a stunt for a first series episode, Martins tore her achilles tendon. She has said that during the production of Death in Paradise she discovered that some of her mannerisms are distinctly French.

The third series killed off Inspector Poole in the first episode and he was replaced by another British Detective Inspector, Humphrey Goodman (played by Kris Marshall). The fourth episode of the fourth series "Until Death Do You Part", was Martins' last; her character was written out as moving to Paris. Of her departure from the show, she is quoted as saying: "I've loved everything about the show. But the only way to grow in life is to take risks, even if it means losing something you love, or leaving a place that's comfortable". In 2021, she and Miller returned for a two-part episode.

=== Later appearances ===
Martins appeared in two French detective shows, La Loi d'Alexandre, first episode ("Comme des frères"), and Capitaine Marleau, episode 2 ("La mémoire enfouie") in Series 2. She appeared in the British series Father Brown in 2018 as the wife of criminal Flambeau.

In 2018, she had the role of police inspector in the television movie Un Mensonge Oublié, English title Children of the Lie. She also appeared in Kiss & Tell (Voyez Comme On Danse) and the British TG movie, I Love My Mum.

In 2020, she played the police detective in eight episodes of the French television series Grand Hôtel. She appeared as Victoire in six episodes of Réunions, a French television series set on La Réunion. She played Diane Dombre in the French television series Alexandra Ehle, about a persistent coroner in Bordeaux.

She played a role in Citadel, on Prime Video in 2023.

== Selected filmography ==
=== Film ===
Year	Title	Role	Notes
2002	Les Amateurs (Amateurs)	Maya	Feature film
2002	Merguez, panini, kebab, jambon-beurre		Short film
2004	ne quittez pas! (Local Call)		Feature film
2004	Dans tes rêves		Feature film
2006	Tell No One	L'amie de Bruno	Feature film
2006	Beyond the Ocean	Olga	
2006	Paris, je t'aime	Sara	Feature film
2006	Girlfriends	Shaheen	Feature film
2006	J'invente rien		Feature film
2006	Fragile(s) (By the Way)	Sara	Feature film
2007	Rumeurs, commérages, on dit que		Short film
2007	La Solution		Short film
2008	l"Heure d'été (Summer Hours)	Press agent	Feature film
2008	Après l'océan	Olga	Feature film
2008	Orpailleur (Garimpeiro, The Gold Forest)	Yann	Feature film
2009	Mensch	Helena	Feature film
2010	Les Petits Mouchoirs (Little White Lies)	Marie's girlfriend	Feature film
2010	Last Blood		Short film
2010	Non Compliant Profile		Short film
2010	The Marquis		Feature film
2013	Une Ideé en l'air (Just an Idea)		Short film
2024	Coup de Chance	Julia	Feature film

=== Television ===
Year	Title	Role	Notes
2001 & 2003	Police district	Julie	Season 1 and 3
2001	Maigret	Jojo	Season 10: episode 2
2003	Par amour	Maria	Television film
2005	Disparition	Karine	Television film
2005	Le Proc	Virginie Desplat	Season 2: episode 3
2006	Les Tricheurs	Sophie	Season 1: episode 1; season 2: episode 1, season 3: episode 1
2006	Les bleus: premiers pas dans la police	Mathilde Forestier	Season 1: episode 1
2006	Les Secrets du volcan	Jasmine Mahé	Season 1: 4 episodes
2006–07	P.J. (C.I.D.)	Estelle	Seasons 10–12: 9 episodes
2007	Merci, les enfants vont bien!	Jeanne	Season 4: episodes 1, 2, 3, 4
2008	La Veuve tatouée	Sylvie	Television film
2008	Les tricheurs	Sophie Devailly	Season 1: episode 1, season 2: episode 1, season 3: episode 1
2009	Pigalle, la nuit	Fleur	Season 1: 8 episodes (as regular)
2011	Caïn	Barbara Simon	Season 1: episode 2
2011	Signature	Hélène	Season 1: episodes 1, 3, 4, 5, 6
2011	Insoupçonnable	Julie	Television film
2013–14	Détectives	Nora Abadie	Seasons 1–2: 16 episodes (as regular)
2011–15, 2021, 2024	Death in Paradise	Camille Bordey	Series 1–4: 28 episodes (as regular) Series 13: (video call)
2015	American Odyssey	Serena	Season 1: episodes 5, 6, 11
2015	The law of Alexandre	Sonia Dubois	Season 2: episode 1
2017	Capitaine Marleau	Irène Ruff	Season 2: episode 3
2018	Father Brown	Lisandra Flambeau	Episode 6.10 "The Two Deaths of Hercule Flambeau"
2024	Those About to Die	Cala	Main cast
