= Death in Paradise =

Crime drama television series

- Genre: Comedy drama; Crime drama; Detective fiction; Cozy mystery; Whodunit
- Created by: Robert Thorogood
- Starring: Current: Don Gilet; Élizabeth Bourgine; Don Warrington; Shantol Jackson; Shaquille Ali-Yebuah; Catherine Garton
- Theme music composer: Coxsone Dodd
- Opening theme: "You're Wondering Now"
- Composers: Magnus Fiennes; David Michael Celia
- Countries of origin: United Kingdom; France
- Original languages: English; French
- No. of series: 15
- No. of episodes: 125 (list of episodes)

Production
- Executive producers: Robert Thorogood; Tony Jordan; Klaus Zimmermann; Belinda Campbell; Alex Jones; Tim Key; James Hall; Ceri Meyrick; Amy Rodriguez
- Producers: Matthew Bird; Tim Key; Tim Bradley; Louise Stutton; Yvonne Francas; Sue Howells; Ella Kelly; Jim Poyser; Candida Julian-Jones; Jon Zarych; Joanna Hanley; Ray McBride; Emma Grazette
- Production locations: Guadeloupe, United Kingdom
- Running time: 60 minutes (regular episodes); 90 minutes (Christmas specials)
- Production companies: Red Planet Pictures; Atlantique Production (2011); Kudos (2011-2013)

Original release
- Network: BBC One
- Release: 25 October 2011 – present
- Network: France 2
- Release: 22 July 2013 – present

Related
- Beyond Paradise; Return to Paradise

Death in Paradise is a comedy crime television series created by Robert Thorogood, starring Ben Miller (Series 1-3), Kris Marshall (Series 3-6), Ardal O'Hanlon (Series 6-9), Ralf Little (Series 9-13) and Don Gilet (Series 14-present). The series is set on the small fictional Caribbean island of Saint Marie. The premise is that a British Detective Inspector is dispatched reluctantly to the island to solve the murder of a policeman and remains to solve further crimes against his will, in conjunction with the local police. In subsequent seasons further British detectives replace the original, usually with a similar degree of reluctance. The plots combine gentle murder mystery with primarily culture clash comedy. The show is broadcast on BBC One in the United Kingdom, France 2 in France, PBS in the United States, Prime in New Zealand (with repeats on BBC UKTV) and Foxtel's BBC First channel, ABC, 9Gem in Australia, with repeat episodes on Atreseries in Spain. The series was inspired by a real-life event when Bob Woolmer, the coach of the Pakistan national cricket team, died in suspicious circumstances in Jamaica during the 2007 Cricket World Cup and British policeman Mark Shields of the Jamaica Constabulary Force led the murder investigation. Since its 2011 debut, Death in Paradise has enjoyed high viewing figures and a generally positive critical reception, leading to repeated renewals. The show is currently set to air until at least 2028. A spin-off series, Beyond Paradise, began airing in 2023 with Marshall reprising his role of DI Humphrey Goodman, while a second spin-off, Return to Paradise, began airing in 2024.

== Synopsis ==
Detective Inspector Richard Poole (Ben Miller) is sent from the Metropolitan Police in London to investigate the murder of Charlie Hulme, a British police officer on the fictional Caribbean island of Saint Marie, a British Overseas Territory with a French colonial history. After he finds the murderer (later revealed to be Sergeant Lily Thompson), he is ordered by his supervisors to stay on as the Detective Inspector (DI) of the island, much to his dismay, solving new cases as they appear and being the object of many fish-out-of-water jokes. At the start of series 3, Poole is himself murdered while attending a 25th anniversary party and clumsy London DI Humphrey Goodman (Kris Marshall) arrives to investigate the death of his deadpan predecessor. After he finds the murderer (later revealed to be Helen Reed), he stays on the island permanently after learning from his wife, Sally, that she is leaving him. In the second half of series 6, he resigns so he can start a new life in London with his new girlfriend Martha Lloyd (who he later marries), after forming a relationship with her while she was staying at Saint Marie on holiday. Goodman's replacement on Saint Marie is DI Jack Mooney (Ardal O'Hanlon), a recent widower grieving the loss of his wife and who assisted the team on a case in London. Mooney embraces island life and remains on Saint Marie until mid-way through series 9, when he decides he is ready to face the memory of his deceased wife and returns to London to be with his daughter. Mooney's replacement is DI Neville Parker (Ralf Little), who, like DI Poole before him, initially dislikes being on the island and has severe allergies, especially to bug bites. He comes to the island only because the team needs a British detective to sign off on a case and is forced to stay longer after a period of illness renders him temporarily unfit to travel. However, he decides to remain on the island and eventually warms to the island lifestyle. He stays until series 13, when he departs to travel and be in a relationship with former Detective Sergeant (DS) Florence Cassell (Joséphine Jobert), who joined the team initially as an Officer after Sergeant Fidel Best departed following series 3. During the Christmas 2024 special, Commissioner Selwyn Patterson (Don Warrington) calls London for yet another replacement DI to lead investigations in Saint Marie. Mervin Wilson (Don Gilet) happens to be visiting the island on holiday. As he is boarding the aircraft to take him away from the 'slow-paced' island, he receives a telephone call from his superior ordering him to stay and solve the murder. Although Wilson is annoyed by island life (much like DIs Poole and, initially, Parker before him), a personal connection to Saint Marie spurs him to remain there.

== Episodes ==
Series	Episodes	Originally released		Avg. UK viewers (millions)
Series	Episodes	First released	Last released	Avg. UK viewers (millions)
1	8	25 October 2011	13 December 2011	5.89
2	8	8 January 2013	26 February 2013	7.67
3	8	14 January 2014	4 March 2014	8.46
4	8	8 January 2015	26 February 2015	8.60
5	8	7 January 2016	25 February 2016	8.08
6	8	5 January 2017	23 February 2017	8.45
7	8	4 January 2018	22 February 2018	7.72
8	8	10 January 2019	28 February 2019	7.84
9	8	9 January 2020	27 February 2020	7.54
10	8	7 January 2021	18 February 2021	8.13
2021 Special		26 December 2021		7.96
11	8	7 January 2022	25 February 2022	7.52
2022 Special		26 December 2022		7.83
12	8	6 January 2023	24 February 2023	7.31
2023 Special		26 December 2023		6.61
13	8	4 February 2024	24 March 2024	7.30
2024 Special		22 December 2024		7.22
14	8	31 January 2025	28 March 2025	5.97
2025 Special		28 December 2025		6.1
15	8	30 January 2026	27 March 2026	5.14
2026 Special		27 November 2026		TBA

== Format ==
The show is known for its formulaic approach to its plots with each episode roughly the same in length, style and narrative structure. Each episode begins with a pre-credits sequence showing the events leading up to a murder and often the discovery of the body afterwards; this sequence also serves to introduce that particular episode's guest characters. The police force of Saint Marie is subsequently informed of the murder, preliminary investigations and interviews take place to establish the suspects, and photographs of the suspects and crime scene are placed on the whiteboard at police headquarters.

The crime often presents an apparently impossible feature, with a closed circle of suspects, all of whom have motive but none of whom appear to have had opportunity. They either present what seem to be airtight alibis for the time the crime was believed to have committed, or the crime is a locked-room mystery, with the victim being found in circumstances that appear to make it impossible that anyone could have entered or left the location without being observed.

Often towards the end, the lead DI will have a moment of realisation, perhaps brought on by something that someone says or does, or by some occurrence. At this moment, the how, why, and who of the murder are comprehended by the DI, but are not revealed to the audience. The suspects are then gathered, and the DI talks through the evidence; often, flashbacks are used to show what happened. The murderer and the motive are revealed in the dénouement of the episode. Gathering the suspects, going through the events and finally identifying and arresting the murderer is based on the technique Agatha Christie uses in the Miss Marple stories and some of the Hercule Poirot ones.

Normally, each episode ends with a comedic scene or a celebratory trip by the police officers to Catherine's bar. The final episode of most series has included a subplot wherein the lead DI is tempted to return to the UK by the prospect of a job offer or personal relationship, but in the end, he decides to remain on the island.

This format was subverted in the sixth series, when the two-part storyline in the fifth and sixth episodes saw the team travel to London to follow up on a current case, resulting in Goodman deciding to remain to be with his new girlfriend, Martha; Mooney travelled back to Saint-Marie, initially as a holiday to help escape the memory of his recently deceased wife, but decided to remain as the new detective inspector of the island. This format was also subverted in the ninth series; Mooney decided to return to Britain mid-way through the series as he felt that he was ready to face the memory of his dead wife, with the new inspector (DI Neville Parker) initially coming to the island just to sign off on a particular body but kept for a few weeks for health reasons before he decided to remain to face a new challenge. Parker remains the DI on the island until the end of Series 13, when he departs the island to go travelling with his former DS Florence Cassell. His replacement, DI Mervin Wilson, initially just ended up working with the team by chance in the 2024 Christmas special as he was on holiday on the island when a difficult case came up, but he was subsequently convinced to sign a three-month contract to remain on the island that he later chose to extend.

While Death in Paradise has continued to be in the top three most popular programmes on British television, critics have called the crime drama "unremarkable" and "an undemanding detective show, with nice Caribbean scenery."

== Setting ==
=== Saint Marie ===
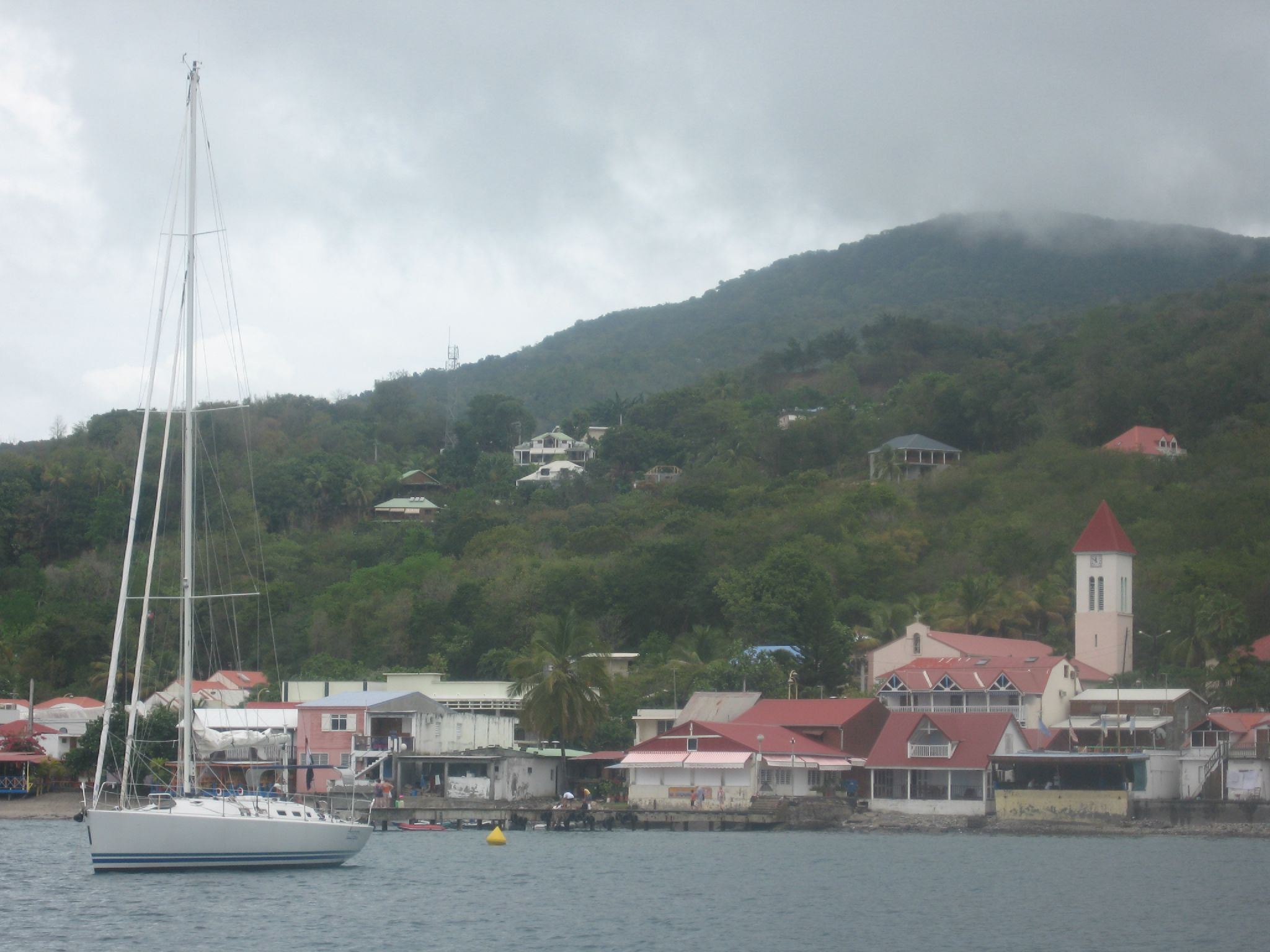
Deshaies on Guadeloupe, which is used for the town of Honoré in Death in Paradise.

Death in Paradise is set on the fictional Caribbean island of Saint Marie, described in episode 3.3 as a "pretty island" that is "situated in the Eastern Caribbean Sea". In episode 4.5, it is mentioned that Martinique is "a good 70 miles". Saint Marie is "one-tenth the size of its north-west neighbour Guadeloupe"; this would make Saint Marie about 63 square miles (160 km^{2}) in size. Saint Marie is a British Overseas Territory, but about 30% of its people are French, due to its previous history, with the language still widely spoken.

The back-story appears to be a blend of two real-world islands near Guadeloupe, with size and location aligning with Marie-Galante and history and language aligning with Dominica. In the TV show, the fictional Saint Marie island has a volcano, rainforest, sugar plantations, a fishing harbour, an airport, a university, a convent, approximately 100 public beaches and a Crown Court. It also has its own newspaper, The Saint Marie Times, a radio station, Radio Saint Marie, and a television station, Saint Marie Broadcasting Corporation (SMBC). Its vehicles have French number plates, and motor vehicles drive on the right. Police uniforms are also French, not British. The police hierarchy is a blend of French and British, as the Detective Inspectors are British and the Commissioner reports to the Chief Commissioner in Jamaica (formerly a British territory), while the Internal Affairs team is from France.

Honoré, the name of the main town, is a reference to St Honoré, the setting of A Caribbean Mystery by Agatha Christie. The town has a leisure/commercial marina, market, bars and restaurants as well as the police station. The neighbouring town to Honoré is named Port Royal. Saint Marie's main economic ties are to Guadeloupe, the UK and France. The island's main religions are Catholicism and Voodoo, with several religious festivals featuring in the programme, including the Saint Ursula Festival (in reality, a major festival of the Virgin Islands) and some Voodoo festivals.

=== Other locations ===
Series 3, episode 7 is largely set on an islet just off Saint Marie; it is privately owned and relatively small. This episode was actually filmed on the island of Kahouanne, around 1.2 miles (1.9 km) off the northwest coast of Guadeloupe where the series is normally filmed. It can often be seen in the background from a beach on Saint Marie. Series 6, Episodes 5 and 6 are largely set in London, when Goodman, Cassell, and Officer Myers form a liaison team with Mooney in order to track down suspects in a murder investigation in Saint Marie and later to investigate the murder of one of the suspects. Season 15 episode 6 takes place mainly on the (real) island of Antigua

Other fictional islands (Saint Felix, Saint Helene, Saint Barnabas, and Saint Auguste) have featured throughout the series, with the Saint Marie police responsible for overseeing their local law enforcement.

== Characters ==
=== Main ===
- Ben Miller as Detective Inspector (DI) Richard Poole (series 1-2; guest series 3, 10)
- Sara Martins as Detective Sergeant (DS) Camille Bordey (series 1-4; guest series 10, 13)
- Danny John-Jules as Officer Dwayne Myers (series 1-7, 13, 2024 Special; guest 2021 Special)
- Gary Carr as Officer/Sergeant Fidel Best (series 1-3)
- Don Warrington as Commissioner Selwyn Patterson (series 1-present)
- Élizabeth Bourgine as Catherine Bordey (later mayor of Honoré, the main town of Saint Marie), Camille's mother and owner of Catherine's Bar (series 2-present; recurring series 1)
- Kris Marshall as Detective Inspector (DI) Humphrey Goodman (series 3-6)
- Joséphine Jobert as Officer/Sergeant/Detective Sergeant (DS) Florence Cassell (series 4-8, 10-11; recurring series 13)
- Tobi Bakare as Officer/Sergeant Jean-Pierre "J.P." Hooper (series 4-10; guest series 13-14)
- Ardal O'Hanlon as Detective Inspector (DI) Jack Mooney (series 6-9)
- Aude Legastelois-Bidé as Detective Sergeant (DS) Madeleine Dumas (series 8-9)
- Shyko Amos as Officer Ruby Patterson (series 8-9)
- Ralf Little as Detective Inspector (DI) Neville Parker (guest series 1, series 9-13)
- Tahj Miles as Trainee/Officer Marlon Pryce (series 10-13)
- Shantol Jackson as Sergeant later Detective Sergeant (DS) Naomi Thomas (series 11-present)
- Ginny Holder as Trainee/Officer Darlene Curtis (series 11-14, 2025 Special; recurring series 7)
- Don Gilet as Detective Inspector (DI) Mervin Wilson (guest series 4, 2024 Special, series 14-present)
- Shaquille Ali-Yebuah as Officer Sebastian Rose (series 14-present)
- Catherine Garton as Sergeant Mattie Fletcher (series 15-present)

=== Recurring ===
Recurring Death in Paradise characters
Character	Actor	Years	Episodes
Marlon Collins	Sean Maguire	2011, 2024	1.1, 13.1
Aidan Miles	Adrian Dunbar	2011	1.7-1.8
Sally Goodman	Morven Christie	2014	3.1^{a}, 3.8
Martin Goodman, QC	James Fox	2015	4.7^{a}-4.8
Rosey Hooper (née Fabrice)	Fola Evans-Akingbola (2016), Prisca Bakare (2021)	2016, 2021	5.3, 5.5-5.6, 5.8, 10.3, 10.8
Martha Lloyd	Sally Bretton	2016-2017	5.8, 6.1, 6.3-6.4, 6.6
Nelson Myers	Ram John Holder	2017-2018, 2021-2022, 2024	6.5-6.6, 7.7-7.8, 11.0^{a}, 12.0^{a}, 14.0
Siobhan Mooney	Grace Stone	2017-2020	6.6-7.1, 8.8, 9.4
Patrice Campbell	Leemore Marrett Jr.	2019	8.1-8.6
Anna Masani	Nina Wadia	2020	9.1-9.4
Izzy Parker	Kate O'Flynn	2022	11.5-11.7
Sophie Chambers/Rebecca Warmslow	Chelsea Edge	2022-2023	12.0-12.2, 12.5-12.8
Justin West	Robert Webb	2023	12.2, 12.7
DC Andrew Buckley	Kent Riley	2023	12.3, 12.7
Andrina Harper Patterson	Genesis Lynea	2023-2024	12.5, 13.2-13.3
Zoe Ainsworth	Taj Atwal	2024	13.5-13.6
Brianna Clemetson	Joy Richardson	2024-2025	14.0, 14.2, 14.7
Roy Palmer	Gerard Horan	2025	14.6-14.7
Sterling Fox	Trieve Blackwood-Cambridge	2025-2026	14.6-14.7, 15.6
Solomon Clarke	Daniel Ward	2026	15.1-15.2, 15.6, 15.8
Eloise Clarke	Avah Cotterell	2026	15.7-15.8

^a Made a voice cameo in this episode.

Danny John-Jules, the longest-tenured actor in the series not named Don Warrington or Elizabeth Bourgine, did not return for series eight and was replaced by Shyko Amos. John-Jules cited his reason for exiting the show as wanting to leave "on a high." Both Amos and Aude Legastelois-Bidé left at the conclusion of series 9. John-Jules would later return for series 13.

=== Harry ===
In addition to the human characters, a recurring animal character is "Harry," a lizard who lives at the Detective Inspector's shack. He appears in almost every episode and acts as a sounding board for the Detective Inspector to discuss the status of the current case and his life experiences. Harry is computer-generated.

== Production ==
The original team (left-to-right): Sara Martins, Danny John-Jules, Gary Carr and Ben Miller

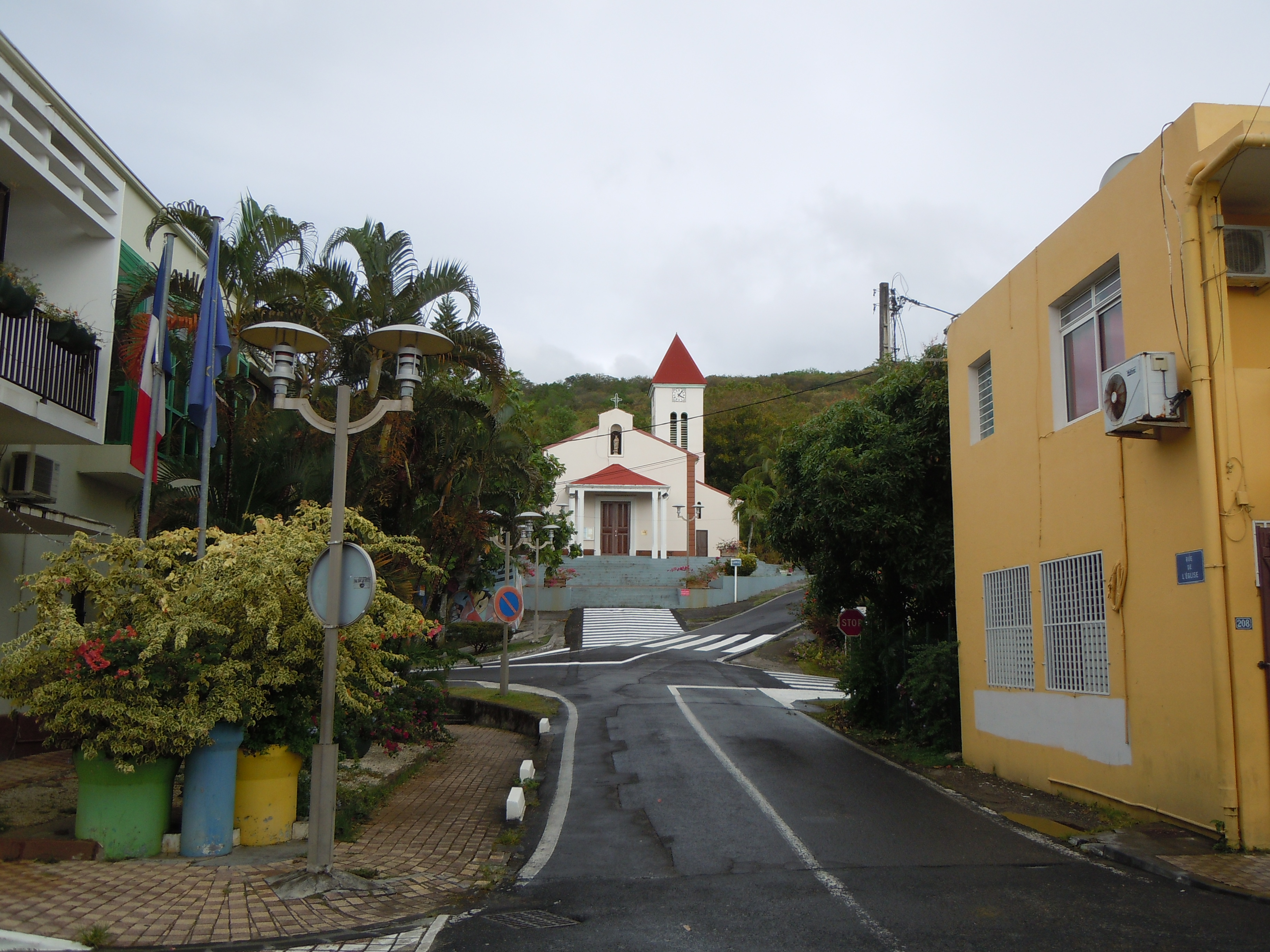
Deshaies' church is right next to the fictional "Honoré police station".

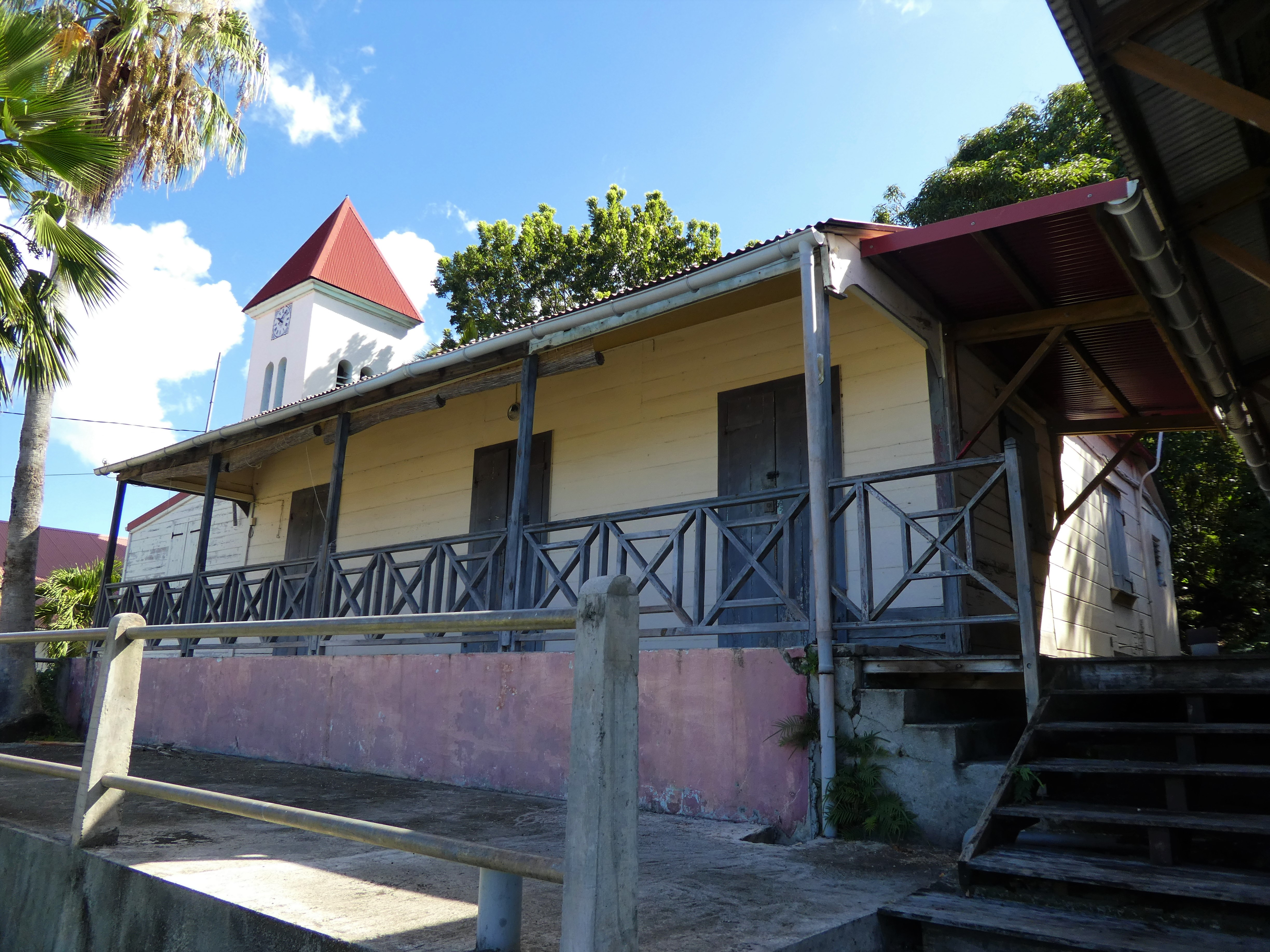
View of the Presbytery at Deshaies (Guadeloupe, c.1850s), which serves as the police station

The series is filmed on the French archipelago of Guadeloupe in the Lesser Antilles, mainly in the commune of Deshaies (which doubles for the town of Honoré on the fictional island of Saint Marie), with the help of the Bureau d'accueil des tournages de la Région Guadeloupe. The site of the Honoré police station is a church hall in Deshaies (built c.1850s), with the priest's office appearing as the incident room.

Filming series 1 was particularly difficult, due to the lack of infrastructure in Guadeloupe for long-term filming, as well as the fact that Sara Martins, the actress who plays DS Camille Bordey, broke her leg in the middle of filming, causing her to be almost entirely written out of episode 6 of series 1 and causing difficulties during the filming of episodes 7 and 8.

Miller left the series at the start of series 3, as he felt he was spending too much time away from his family, since his wife was unable to join him on the island during production. Marshall's family joined him on the island during his first three six-month shoots and his son, Thomas, enrolled at a local school. When his family could not join him during the filming of the sixth series, following the birth of his baby daughter, Elsie, it left him feeling "bereft and empty" and he subsequently decided to leave the show.

From episode 7 of the sixth series, the lead role was taken by Ardal O'Hanlon playing DI Jack Mooney, a London colleague. Joséphine Jobert left the series after episode 6 of the eighth series and was replaced by actress Aude Legastelois, who plays Madeleine Dumas. Jobert cited her reason for exiting the show as wanting to "focus on other projects". O'Hanlon confirmed he had left the show in October 2019, with his last appearance coming in series 9, episode 4. His replacement, Ralf Little who plays DI Neville Parker, was revealed the same month.

In July 2020, the BBC announced the departure of Shyko Amos and Legastelois, along with the return of Jobert and the arrival of newcomer Tahj Miles as Marlon Pryce.

In January 2022, in the fourth episode of series 11, Jobert left the show for the second time after her character left the island. Her departure had not been previously announced. She returned again for the third time in series 13, episode six, broadcast in March 2024. Meanwhile, Tahj Miles departed the island as Marlon Pryce the episode beforehand, he was replaced by Dwayne Myers, who had previously left. Ralf Little departs as Neville at the end of the series, with Florence, as they express their love for each other.

== Reception ==
=== Viewing figures ===
Death in Paradise has gained popularity over time on British TV.

Series 1 (2011) has been the least-watched to date, averaging 5.89 million viewers, with the 5.3 million viewers for the sixth episode, "An Unhelpful Aid", being the lowest the show has had. Each episode was among the top five most-watched programmes of the day and in the top 40 of the week.

Series 2 (2013) averaged 7.67 million viewers, with each episode among the top two most-watched programmes of the day and in the top 15 of the week.

Series 3 (2014) averaged 8.46 million viewers, with each episode among the top two most-watched programmes of the day and in the top ten of the week.

Series 4 (2015) averaged 9.03 million viewers. Based on consolidated figures, each episode was among the top three most-watched programmes of the day and in the top ten of the week.

Series 5 (2016) averaged 8.67 million viewers. Based on consolidated figures, each episode was the most-watched programme of the day and in the top four of the week.

Series 6 (2017) has been the most-watched so far, averaging 9.1 million viewers. The series premiere, "Erupting in Murder", is the most-watched episode of the show to date with 9.81 million viewers. Based on consolidated figures, each episode of Series 6 was the most-watched programme of the day and in the top four of the week.

Series 7 (2018) averaged 8.34 million viewers. Based on consolidated figures, each episode was the most-watched programme of the day and in the top ten of the week.

Series 8 (2019) averaged 8.2 million viewers. Based on consolidated figures, each episode was the most-watched programme of the day and in the top seven of the week.

Series 9 (2020) averaged 8.14 million viewers. Based on consolidated figures, each episode was the most-watched programme of the day and in the top six of the week.

According to a Radio Times article in 2018, "From Australia to Russia to India, stretching across 236 territories, this British crime comedy-drama has become a global phenomenon."

=== Critical response ===
The series has received mixed reviews from critics, with most criticism directed towards its formulaic structure. The first series was praised for its refreshing style and setting. Kris Marshall's introduction at the start of series 3 was particularly well received, with Rebecca Smith of The Daily Telegraph citing Marshall as a "winning addition" to the cast. The series 4 premiere was described as "a little piece of escapism" and was generally praised. Mark Monahan of The Daily Telegraph criticised the laid-back tone of the series, calling it too methodical with nothing unique about it besides the setting.

There have also been media comments about colonialism and racism. After the first episode aired in 2011, Metro TV critic Keith Watson wrote that "the idea of parachuting a policeman into a colonial setting because the locals weren't up to the job left a slightly sour taste," and the series resembled a "throwback to the fading glory days of the British Empire". In a January 2021 Guardian essay, writer Sirin Kale pointed out the "large and appreciative audience", but was critical of several aspects, including the racial dynamics: "If Death in Paradise was a dated show when it aired – a throwback to Peter Falk in a trench coat asking just one more thing – it is a museum piece now. For starters, the cast of mostly Black supporting actors call the show's white, male lead 'Sir', and rely on him to solve crimes that are apparently beyond their wits to work out."

=== Awards ===
Red Planet Pictures was nominated for, and won, the "Diversity in a Drama Production Award" for Death in Paradise. Sara Martins, Danny John-Jules, Don Warrington and Tobi Bakare collected the award at a ceremony supported by the BBC and ITV that took place on 15 February 2015.

== Broadcast ==
In the UK, all series are shown on BBC One. The first series was broadcast in late 2011. The second series was broadcast in January 2013, with subsequent series filling the same January slot; all series were shown in a 9:00–10:00 pm slot. (Note: Series 4, episode 7 was shown earlier at 8.25 pm-9.25 pm due to EastEnders Live 30th anniversary celebrations.) In France the programme is broadcast on France 2 and France Ô. Death in Paradise is broadcast in 236 territories. The entire series has been available to stream all year around since May 2020 on Britbox. In the USA the programme appears on a number of PBS stations. The show is currently featured on Ovation's "Morning Mysteries" block on Fridays, and also used to air on the network every Thursday night at 7PM with back-to-back episodes. Also in the USA, as of 1 April 2026, Pluto TV streams DIP episodes in a marathon manner on Fridays and Saturdays. In Germany, the show is now streaming on Disney+ as part of their third-party contract agreement.

== Home media ==
Home media releases for Death in Paradise
Series	Region 2	Region 1	Region 4	Discs	Extras
1	8 October 2012	17 June 2014	2 August 2012	2	—N/a
2	4 March 2013	16 September 2014	3 July 2013	3	—N/a
3	10 March 2014	5 May 2015	25 May 2014	3	The Making of Death in Paradise on disc three; seven short insights into the making of Death in Paradise
4	2 March 2015	5 July 2016	18 March 2015	3	—N/a
5	29 February 2016	13 December 2016	16 March 2016	3	The Making of Death in Paradise; Creating the Puzzle; Harry the Lizard; Tour of Honoré Police Station; The Vehicles
1–5	29 February 2016	—N/a	16 March 2016	14	same extras that were on series 3 and 5 (no extras were made for series 1, 2 and 4)
6	27 February 2017	12 December 2017	29 March 2017	3	—N/a
1–6	—N/a	—N/a	29 March 2017	17	same extras that were on series 3 and 5
7	26 February 2018	December 2018	14 March 2018	3	
1–7	—N/a	—N/a	14 March 2018	20	
8	4 March 2019	10 December 2019	3 April 2019	3	
1–8	2019	TBA	N/A	23	
9	2 March 2020	8 December 2020	8 April 2020	3	
10	22 March 2021	30 November 2021	28 April 2021	3	
11	21 March 2022	1 November 2022	28 February 2024	3	includes the 2021 Christmas special
12	27 March 2023	6 June 2023	6 December 2023	3	includes the 2022 Christmas special
13	25 March 2024	18 June 2024	19 June 2024	3	includes the 2023 Christmas special and episode 100
14	31 March 2025	17 Jun 2025	16 July 2025	3	includes the 2024 Christmas special
15	30 March 2026	9 Jun 2026	TBA	3	includes the 2025 Christmas special

== Music ==
=== Theme music ===
The theme music is an instrumental version of a Jamaican song from the 1960s, "You're Wondering Now", written by Coxsone Dodd, originally recorded by Andy & Joey in Jamaica. It was later made famous by The Skatalites and in Europe by ska band The Specials and later still by Amy Winehouse, as featured on some editions of the deluxe version of her album Back to Black. In the final scene of the first episode of the third series, the cover version recorded by The Skatalites in 1994 is played at the bar. It appeared on the official Death in Paradise soundtrack, released in January 2015, alongside other music from all four series. The original version of the song, as recorded by Andy & Joey, was played towards the end of the last episode of the sixth series. It was also recorded by Robert Wyatt on his album Mid-Eighties (1993), under the title "Alfie and Robert Sail Off Into the Sunset", only repeating the lines "You're wondering now / What to do, now you know this is the end". In the French version, the opening song is "Sunday Shining" by Finley Quaye.

The theme music was given a slight overhaul in 2018, when new composer David Michael Celia joined the team and along with Magnus Fiennes, they added more bass to their theme. This theme would only last until 2020. The theme music was given another, bigger overhaul in 2021, with completely new music but still based on the original theme. It was given a new melody and bassline. The composer, Magnus Fiennes, said in an interview that the theme tune needed to be changed for its tenth anniversary. The 2021 Christmas special saw the extended version of this theme tune playing over the car with the Carib Rockets, being transported to the Carlton Villa. The lyrics were also sung over the end credits for both specials.

=== Soundtrack ===
In January 2015, the BBC released an official soundtrack compiling 26 songs from the first four series of the show. It contains original music for Death in Paradise and already extant tunes, though it does not include the theme music from the show.

The score of the show itself is composed by Magnus Fiennes and features musicians such as the Los Angeles based Reggae band The Lions (Blake Colie on drums, Dave Wilder on bass, Dan Ubick on guitar) and keyboard/melodica player Roger Rivas.

Each detective had their own personalized score based around their personality. Richard Poole had a mournful jazz clarinet, Humphrey Goodman a bassoon, Jack Mooney has a mandolin, and DI Neville Parker has gypsy jazz.

== Novels ==
The creator of the show, Robert Thorogood, signed a three-book deal to write Death in Paradise novels featuring the original characters (D.I. Richard Poole, D.S. Camille Bordey, Officer Dwayne Myers, Sergeant Fidel Best and Comm. Selwyn Patterson). The first of these, A Meditation on Murder (A Death in Paradise novel), was published in January 2015. Early reviews were generally favourable, with the Daily Express in particular being complimentary, giving it four stars. The second book, The Killing of Polly Carter, was released in 2016. The third book, Death Knocks Twice, was released in 2017. A fourth book, Murder in the Caribbean, was published in December 2018.

== Spin-off series ==
In June 2022, a spin-off was announced, titled Beyond Paradise, airing in the UK on 24 February 2023, which saw the return of Kris Marshall as Humphrey Goodman, and Sally Bretton as his fiancee Martha Lloyd as they enjoy life in Britain. The spin-off was commissioned by BBC One and BritBox International. Filming of the series started in August 2022. In theory set in South Devon, it was actually filmed in Cornwall. After the first series ended, the BBC announced it had been renewed for a second series plus a Christmas special airing later in 2023. A third series aired from 28 March to 2 May 2025, with a Christmas special in December. A fourth series aired from 27 March to 1 May, 2026.

A second spin-off called Return to Paradise for ABC television in Australia and BBC One was announced in November 2023. The 6-episode series is set in the beachside hamlet of Dolphin Cove. The series was released in October 2024 on ABC-TV and iView in Australia, and in November 2024 on BBC One and iPlayer in the UK. A second series started airing on 31 October 2025 on BBC One.

== Adaptation ==
In October 2026, BBC Studios announced the first international adaptation of Death in Paradise, a Croatian-language series titled Ubojstvo u raju. The adaptation will consist of six 60-minute episodes and is being produced by CGM Films for Croatian Radiotelevision (HRT), with plans to air on HRT 1.

The series will be set in a fictional island community on the Croatian island of Brač, with filming scheduled to take place in and around Supetar. Principal photography is planned to begin in spring 2027. The adaptation will be produced by Bruno Mustić and Ivan Lovreček, directed by Jelena Gavrilović, and written by Sonja Tarokić and Valentina Batalić, with Maja Fišter serving as commissioning editor for HRT. The producers intend to adapt the original format to Croatian culture, incorporating characters and crime stories rooted in life on the Adriatic islands.
