= Recurring =

Recurring means occurring repeatedly and can refer to several different things:

== Mathematics and finance ==
- Recurring expense, an ongoing (continual) expenditure
- Repeating decimal, or recurring decimal, a real number in the decimal numeral system in which a sequence of digits repeats infinitely
- Curiously recurring template pattern (CRTP), a software design pattern

== Processes ==
- Recursion, the process of repeating items in a self-similar way
- Recurring dream, a dream that someone repeatedly experiences over an extended period

== Television ==
- Recurring character, a character, usually on a television series, that appears from time to time and may grow into a larger role
- Recurring status, condition whereby a soap opera actor may be used for extended period without being under contract

== Other uses ==
- Recurring (album), a 1991 album by the British psychedelic-rock group, Spacemen 3
