= Camille Bordey =

Fictional character from the television series Death in Paradise

- Death in Paradise character
- Sara Martins as Camille Bordey
- Portrayed by: Sara Martins
- Duration: 2011–2015, 2021, 2024
- First appearance: Series 1, Episode 1
- Last appearance: Series 13 Episode 1
In-universe information
- Occupation: Detective Sergeant
- Father: Marlon Croft
- Mother: Catherine Bordey

Detective Sergeant Camille Bordey is a character in the crime drama television series Death in Paradise, portrayed by Sara Martins.

== Description ==
A former undercover investigator, Bordey was assigned to Honoré Police because her cover was blown when she was arrested during DI Richard Poole's first investigation. She was the team's most intelligent detective after Poole, often doing the computer work. Initially, she and Poole disliked each other due to a culture clash. Over time their relationship became a close friendship, and showed some signs of romance – when he briefly left Saint Marie, she admitted she admires him a lot, and was happy when he chose to return. His murder in the opening scenes of Series 3 devastated her and she was reluctant to converse with his successor, DI Humphrey Goodman, although she became close to him eventually. She was then offered an undercover job in Paris in Series 4, Episode 4, and decided to leave. As she left, she kissed Humphrey despite not previously expressing romantic feelings for him, although he had for her.

Her mother Catherine owns a popular local bar. Her father, Marlon Croft, who lives in the neighbouring island of St. Lucia, reappears in Series 3, Episode 5, protecting his goddaughter, who is implicated in a case. After suspecting him, Camille starts reconciling with him.

In Series 10, Episode 6, Camille returns to the island after Commissioner Patterson contacted her when her mother was admitted to hospital after being the victim of an attack, leaving her with a serious head trauma. With Florence away following up leads in England, Camille rejoined the team to help investigate the crime linked to her mother's attack. She successfully helps the team solve the case and, following advice given to her after conversing with a memory of DI Richard Poole, decides to spend a few weeks away with Catherine following her recovery to make up for not visiting her since leaving the island, after which she sadly returns to her role in Paris.

In Series 12, Episode 8, Catherine announces that Camille is pregnant having moved in with her partner Leo some months previously. And in Series 13, Episode 1, she makes a guest appearance via FaceTime when she is in labour before giving Neville some advice on his life.

Bordey is hard-working and professional, and has a strong sense of justice. In the first two seasons she sharply contrasts with Poole, including in dress. The Guardian's Michael Hogan suggests that Bordey is "as underdressed as Miller is overdressed, investigating murders in vest and hotpants." Lucy Evans argues that while Bordey is "capable and experienced", she is always one step behind Poole's thought processes.
