= Don Gilet =

English actor

- Born: Walsall, England
- Occupation: Actor
- Years active: 1993—present
- Television: EastEnders; 55 Degrees North; Holby City; Old Jack's Boat; Death in Paradise
- Spouse: Tracy Whitwell (divorced)
- Partner: Siobhan Finneran (2018—present)
- Children: 1

Don Gilet is a British actor. He is best known as Lucas Johnson in EastEnders (2008–2010, 2016, 2020–2021, 2024), Jesse Law in Holby City (2014–2016) and DI Mervin Wilson in Death in Paradise (2024–).

== Early life and education ==
Gilet was brought up in Caldmore, Walsall, with two older sisters.

He attended Whitehall Junior School before Blue Coat Church of England Academy and Sunday school at Caldmore Gospel Hall in Caldmore, and the Mountview Academy of Theatre Arts.

== Career ==
Gilet's first television appearance was on the Channel 4 dating show Streetmate, where he was interviewed as the friend of a participant. His first major role was playing Johnny Lindo in Babyfather (opposite future EastEnders co-star Diane Parish), before landing the lead role in the detective series 55 Degrees North, as Detective Sergeant Nicky Cole. In 2006, he played Leo Charles in The Line of Beauty and had a guest role in the Doctor Who Christmas episode "The Runaway Bride".

In 2001, Gilet appeared in a commercial for Apple's iMac G4 computer. The commercial was named "Window Shopping" and showed Gilet making certain gestures towards the iMac, which the computer later copied. He also appeared as a store manager in a staff training video for Sainsbury's supermarkets. He has had minor appearances in Casualty, Holby City, Silent Witness and The Bill.

Gilet featured in the music video for Gabrielle's 2001 hit "Out of Reach". In 2011, he featured in a music video for the song 'I Want You to Remember' by solo artist I Am Spartacus.

In theatre, he has appeared in As You Like It and The Alchemist.

In April 2008, he joined the BBC television soap opera EastEnders playing serial killer Lucas Johnson. Gilet's character left EastEnders on 30 July 2010.

In 2010, he appeared as Abanazar in the Churchill Theatre Bromley's Christmas pantomime Aladdin alongside Melinda Messenger. He followed that in 2011 by appearing at the Grove Theatre, Dunstable in Jack and the Beanstalk, which also featured his EastEnders co-star Gemma Bissix.

In May 2013, Gilet played the roles of Fuliginous, Ruislip & Blackfriar in a BBC radio adaptation of Neil Gaiman's Neverwhere, adapted by Dirk Maggs.

In 2014, Gilet joined the cast of BBC medical drama Holby City in the role of Consultant Anaesthetist Jesse Law.

In 2015, Gilet rejoined the cast of BBC soap opera EastEnders to reprise his role of Lucas Johnson, departing again on 10 March 2016. In 2017, Gilet joined the TV series The Loch, playing psychologist Blake Albrighton. The character made his debut in the series's first episode on 11 June 2017.

Gilet's Lucas Johnson character returned to EastEnders on 25 December 2020 and departed on 18 March 2021. In 2022, he portrayed the role of Coach Harris in the BBC series Rebel Cheer Squad. Gilet rejoined EastEnders in 2024 for a brief guest stint.

In 2024, it was announced that Gilet would become the new lead detective, DI Mervin Wilson, in the BBC police drama Death in Paradise. He had previously appeared as a guest in the fourth series in 2015, portraying a character called Andre Morgan.

== Personal life ==
Gilet previously lived in Barnet, London, with his wife, Tracy Whitwell, an actress and author, and their son. They later divorced, and Gilet began a relationship with actress Siobhan Finneran in 2018.

== Filmography ==
Year	Title	Role	Notes
1991, 2003	The Bill	Martin Fisher/Gary Heywood	2 episodes
1993	Desmond's	Gerard	Episode: "Lollipop Man"
1993	Demob	Oliver	2 episodes
1994	The Imaginatively Titled Punt & Dennis Show		2 episodes
1995	Now What		TV movie
1998	Brothers and Sisters	Martin Etienne	
2000	The Return of Nick Cotton	Biscuit	TV movie
2001	Casualty	Lee Freeman	Episode: "Lost and Found"
2001–2002	Babyfather	Johnny Lindo	12 episodes
2002	Time Gentlemen Please	Jamie Hardy	Episode: "Storming Up a Cook"
2002	Cutting It	Errol	1 episode
2002, 2014–2016	Holby City	Martin/Jesse Law	Regular (as Jesse Law)
2002	Single Voices	Denzel 'Degsy' Coker	Episode: "Degsy"
2002–2003	Fimbles		Voice
2003	Doctors	P.C. Graham Mitchell	Episode: "Driving Me Mad"
2003	Silent Witness	Carlton Johns	2 episodes
2004	Belly Button	Carl	Short film
2004–2005	55 Degrees North	DS Nicky Cole	Main role
2006	The Line of Beauty	Leo Charles	3 episodes
2006	Doctor Who	Lance Bennett	Episode: "The Runaway Bride"
2006	The Ruby in the Smoke	Henry Hopkins	TV film
2007	Cape Wrath	Freddie Marcuse	8 episodes
2008	Hotel Babylon	Brad Shelford	1 episode
2008–2010, 2016, 2020–2021, 2024	EastEnders	Lucas Johnson	Regular
2010	EastEnders: E20	Lucas Johnson	2 episodes
2012	One Night	DC Hutton	4 episodes
2012–2013	Wizards vs Aliens	Richard Sherwood	3 episodes
2013	Father Brown	Douglas Taylor	1 episode
2013–2014	Old Jack's Boat	Captain Periwinkle	Regular
2015	Death in Paradise	Andre Morgan	1 episode
2017	The Loch	Blake Albrighton	6 episodes
2018	Midsomer Murders	Bill Viner	Episode: "The Lions of Causton"
2018	Death on the Tyne	Alan	TV movie
2019	The Corrupted	DI Graham Patterson	
2019	George & the Dragon	George	Short film
2019	Scarborough	Joe Cassidy	1 episode
2020	The Stranger	Phillip Griffin	3 episodes
2020	Shakespeare & Hathaway: Private Investigators	Winston Hoyte	1 episode
2021	Decrypted	Martin	
2022	Rebel Cheer Squad	Coach Harris	7 episodes
2022	Sherwood	Jacob Harris	2 episodes
2023	Shetland	John Howell	2 episodes
2024	The Beekeeper	Deputy Director Prigg	
2024–	Death in Paradise	DI Mervin Wilson	Main role (15 episodes, as of 13 February 2026)

== Awards and nominations ==
Year	Award	Category	Result	Ref.
2010	Inside Soap Awards	Best Actor	Nominated	
2010	Inside Soap Awards	Best Dramatic Performance	Nominated	
2010	The British Soap Awards	Villain of the Year	Nominated	
2011	The British Soap Awards	Villain of the Year	Shortlisted	
2011	16th National Television Awards	Serial Drama Performance	Nominated	
