= Beyond Paradise (TV series) =

- Genre: Comedy drama; Crime drama; Detective fiction
- Created by: Robert Thorogood; Tony Jordan
- Based on: Characters from Death in Paradise by Robert Thorogood
- Starring: Kris Marshall; Sally Bretton; Zahra Ahmadi; Dylan Llewellyn; Felicity Montagu; Barbara Flynn; Melina Sinadinou; Jamie Bamber
- Theme music composer: Bellowhead
- Opening theme: "Just as the Tide Was Flowing"
- Composer: Magnus Fiennes
- Country of origin: United Kingdom
- Original language: English
- No. of series: 4
- No. of episodes: 27

Production
- Executive producers: Tony Jordan; Tim Key; Belinda Campbell; Alex Jones; Kris Marshall
- Producer: Lindsay Hughes
- Production locations: Looe, Cornwall
- Running time: 60 minutes
- Production company: Red Planet Pictures

Original release
- Network: BBC One
- Release: 24 February 2023 – present

Related
- Death in Paradise; Return to Paradise

Beyond Paradise is a crime television series that acts as a spin-off of the long-running series Death in Paradise. It stars Kris Marshall and Sally Bretton. The BBC announced that it had commissioned the spin-off on 29 June 2022. The first series of six episodes aired weekly from 24 February 2023 to 7 April 2023.

On 7 April 2023, the BBC announced that the series had been renewed for a Christmas special and a six-episode second series. The Christmas Special aired on 24 December 2023 and the second series aired weekly from 24 March 2024 to 26 April 2024. On 26 April 2024, it was announced that another Christmas Special and a third six-episode series had been commissioned. The Christmas Special aired on 27 December 2024 and the third series aired from 28 March 2025 to 2 May 2025. On 29 July 2025, it was confirmed that a fourth series had commenced filming. In December 2025, a Christmas special was aired.

The BBC commissioned a fifth series, with filming to begin in Devon July 2026, that is expected to air on BBC One in 2027.

== Synopsis ==
The show follows Detective Inspector Humphrey Goodman, who left Saint Marie to be with Martha Lloyd. After becoming engaged, the couple move to Martha's hometown of Shipton Abbott, near the Devon coast. Not long after arriving, Humphrey joins the small local police force, where he quickly makes an impression on the local officers: Detective Sergeant Esther Williams, PC Kelby Hartford, and office support worker Margo Martins who, along with stories featuring local aspects including (fictional) local sinister superstitions, bring a whole new approach to police work.

== Cast and characters ==
=== Main ===
- Kris Marshall as Detective Inspector Humphrey Goodman
- Sally Bretton as Martha Lloyd, Humphrey's wife
- Zahra Ahmadi as Detective Sergeant Esther Williams
- Dylan Llewellyn as Constable Kelby Hartford
- Felicity Montagu as Margo Martins, office support
- Melina Sinadinou as Zoe Williams, Esther's daughter (series 3–4; recurring series 1–2)
- Jamie Bamber as Archie Hughes, Martha's former business partner and ex-fiancé (series 3-present; recurring series 1)
- Barbara Flynn as Anne Lloyd, Martha's mother

=== Recurring ===
- Chris Jenks as Josh Woods, petty thief
- Eva Feiler as Lucy, Josh Woods' fiancée
- Jade Harrison as Chief Superintendent Charlotte “Charlie” Woods (series 1–3)
- Peter Davison as Peter/Richard Baxter, Anne's internet date (series 2) (Note: Peter claimed to be called "Richard Baxter" after having met Anne on a dating app in episode 2. In episode 4, Anne discovered that he had had a wife the whole time and his real name was Peter.)
- Amalia Vitale as Hannah Owen, fostering care case worker
- Vincent Franklin as James Smith, Chief Superintendent Wood's replacement who tries to force the police station to downsize (Series 4)
- Gina Bramhill as Amelia, Archie's new girlfriend (Series 4)
- Phil Daniels as Marvelous Harris (Series 1 and 4)

=== Crossover characters from Death in Paradise ===
- Don Warrington as Commissioner Selwyn Patterson
- Élizabeth Bourgine as Catherine Bordey
- Ralf Little as Detective Inspector Neville Parker
- Shantol Jackson as Detective Sergeant Naomi Thomas
- Tahj Miles as Officer Marlon Pryce

== Cast timeline ==
Series	Detective Inspector	Detective Sergeant	Officer	Office Support	Superintendent
1	Humphrey Goodman	Esther Williams	Kelby Hartford	Margo Martins	Charlie Woods
2	Humphrey Goodman	Esther Williams	Kelby Hartford	Margo Martins	Charlie Woods
3	Humphrey Goodman	Esther Williams	Kelby Hartford	Margo Martins	Charlie Woods
4	Humphrey Goodman	Esther Williams	Kelby Hartford	Margo Martins	James Smith
5	Humphrey Goodman	Esther Williams	Kelby Hartford	Margo Martins	

=== Introduced in series 1 ===
- Humphrey Goodman (Kris Marshall, series 1–)
- Martha Goodman (Sally Bretton, series 1–)
- Esther Williams (Zahra Ahmadi, series 1–)
- Kelby Hartford (Dylan Llewellyn, series 1–)
- Margo Martins (Felicity Montagu, series 1–)
- Anne Lloyd (Barbara Flynn, series 1–)
- Archie Hughes (Jamie Bamber, series 1, series 3–)
- Charlie Woods (Jade Harrison, series 1–3)
- Zoe Williams (Melina Sinadinou, series 3–4; recurring series 1–2)

=== Introduced in series 2 ===
- Richard Baxter (Peter Davison, series 2)

=== Introduced in series 3 ===
- Rosie (Bella Rei Blue Stevenson, series 3)

=== Introduced in series 4 ===
- James Smith (Vincent Franklin, series 4)
- Agnieszka (Hazel Caulfield, Kelby's girlfriend, series 4)

== Production ==
=== Casting ===
The detective played by Kris Marshall is one of the most popular to have featured on Death in Paradise, and the producers knew that he resonated with audiences around the world. They felt audiences would want to know what happened to Humphrey and Martha. Sally Bretton also reprised her role from Death in Paradise.

Zahra Ahmadi and Barbara Flynn had both previously appeared in episodes of Death in Paradise playing different characters.

Peter Davison, who appeared in Series 2, previously appeared in an episode of Death in Paradise with Kris Marshall.

=== Location ===
The series is set in the fictional coastal town of Shipton Abbott, South Devon. A number of locations were considered, but the producers settled on the West Country as they felt that Devon had not been used very often in TV drama. They decided to film in the Cornish town of Looe because it has a thriving community with fishing businesses. The fictional town is set slightly back from the coast so different storylines could be developed.

The University of Plymouth's Portland Square and Nancy Astor buildings feature as the South West Police Headquarters.

Anne Lloyd's house, the houseboat, and quay are located on the Pentillie Castle and Estate on the River Tamar north of Plymouth.

== Episodes ==
=== Series overview ===
Series	Episodes	Originally released		Avg. UK viewers (millions)
Series	Episodes	First released	Last released	Avg. UK viewers (millions)
1	6	24 February 2023	7 April 2023	6.78
Special 2023		24 December 2023		6.20
2	6	22 March 2024	26 April 2024	5.60
Special 2024		27 December 2024		5.18
3	6	28 March 2025	2 May 2025	5.14
Special 2025		21 December 2025		5.58
4	6	27 March 2026	1 May 2026	4.73

=== Series 1 (2023) ===
Episodes 4–6 were released on BritBox in the United States a week earlier than they were in the United Kingdom.

No. overall	No. in series	Title	Directed by	Written by	Original release date	UK viewers (millions)
1	1	"Episode 1"	Sandy Johnson	Tony Jordan	24 February 2023	7.57
Humphrey literally drops in to his new position as DI of Shipton Abbott police station. His first cases involve a woman convinced she was pushed by a seventeenth-century witch of local legend who steals children, dealing with a petty thief who's in love, and the theft of a number of red cars. Humphrey and his fiancée, Martha, who is pregnant by IVF treatment, are staying with her mother while Martha looks for premises to open a cafe. Humphrey solves the crimes but he and Martha are struck by personal tragedy: she loses her baby.
2	2	"Episode 2"	Sandy Johnson	Tony Jordan	3 March 2023	7.15
Humphrey and Esther are called to an unlocked house where the family, Matthew and Laura Colbert and their two children, have disappeared, leaving an unfinished evening meal, television and lights on, and a car still in the driveway. PC Kelby is looking into a hit-and-run with his only clue: pieces of plastic from a broken headlight, which he reassembles, finding it to belong to a Kia he is looking for. Following her personal tragedy, Martha is preparing to open her cafe but the bank refuses her loan and Humphrey has bought a houseboat without consulting her, straining their relationship and finances. Humphrey returns to the vacated house where a missing key and a mobile phone belonging to the hit-and-run victim lead him to solve the crime: forced out of the house with the kids by Laura, for a fake emergency involving Matt's mother, Matt refuses to return when Esther reveals an affair. Then, having accidentally run over the man with whom his wife was having an affair, he parks at the edge of a cliff and threatens to drive all of them off it. Meanwhile, Martha is thrown a financial lifeline by local vineyard owner Archie Hughes, to whom she had been previously engaged, and who becomes a junior partner in her cafe. Humphrey misses the opening of the cafe completely to save the Colberts' lives: Matt is poised to drive off the cliff and kill his family, but only the car goes over the edge. Features a posthumous tribute to guest star Ruth Madoc, who played the role of Matthew Colbert's mother.
3	3	"Episode 3"	Matt Carter	Amy Guyler	10 March 2023	7.04
A painting called the "Solo Mare" is being kept under covers at Shipton Manor overnight, before its sale to Louise Fitzallan by owner Terence Witham at the next morning's unveiling. PC Kelby is assigned by Humphrey to remain in the room overnight. When the painting is unveiled, it is gone save for its frame. PC Kelby can only offer the explanation of a brief power outage and a man in an orange baseball cap running from the house and his leaving of the room for only a few minutes. Humphrey and Esther investigate the provenance of the painting which could lead to a motive for the theft. Humphrey is called to the South West police hub to meet the chief superintendent and has a beer with Martha's previous fiancée, Archie.
4	4	"Episode 4"	Sandy Johnson	Ian Kershaw	24 March 2023	6.53
A man is found dead of a suspected heart attack in the middle of a newly made crop circle at North Farm with no identification and the last page of Charles Dickens' novel Great Expectations hidden in his sock. Investigations find his car 10 miles away at the site of an illegal rave with a map of North Farm. The farm is a centre of many sightings of alien ships that the owners, brother and sister Andrew and Cassie Parker, use to supplement the farm's income. Further investigation reveal their estranged father had died recently in prison serving a sentence for a theft of gold bullion that was never recovered. Martha is worried by a food critic coming to review the cafe. She also confides to Humphrey she does not wish to continue the IVF treatment and Archie tries to rekindle their romance with a kiss. Aired two weeks later due to Comic Relief
5	5	"Episode 5"	Matt Carter	Chloe Mi Lin Ewart	31 March 2023	6.39
Three fires twelve hours apart, the last being at Archie's winery, all daubed with the word "PIG" lead Humphrey to suspect the arsonist is using the children's story "Three Little Pigs" as a motive, as he and Esther can find no connection between the victims. A silver button found at the first fire is the only clue. Kelby finds CCTV evidence at a boat shed where petrol and paint were stolen and Esther, as a mother herself, knows the suspect and a what a mother would do to protect a daughter. During a misunderstanding, Archie lets slip to Humphrey he tried to kiss Martha and heart-to-heart talks between Archie and Martha, Humphrey and Esther, and finally Humphrey and Martha lead to her breaking off her engagement to Humphrey.
6	6	"Episode 6"	Matt Carter	Tony Jordan	7 April 2023	6.01
Lucy Elliot's home is burgled, and fingerprints and a boot print found at the scene lead to her ex-girlfriend Hayley Collins, who at the time of the robbery was in the police station cells. The modus operandi of the theft was of known local thief Atticus Styles, who lived within a hundred yards of the burglary, but had an alibi. Elliot's solicitor Kate Nolan, her current girlfriend, worked for the firm that had represented Styles in the past. Esther struggles with the case as Humphrey, distracted by his personal problems, is unable to give the case his full attention. Unable to resolve his personal problems, Humphrey leaves Shipton Abbott for a holiday on Saint Marie and a reunion with old friends Commissioner Patterson and Catherine, and meets the current police team led by DI Neville Parker. An unexpected second reunion on Saint Marie also takes place. Guest appearances: DI Neville Parker (Ralf Little), DS Naomi Thomas (Shantol Jackson), Officer Marlon Pryce (Tahj Miles), Commissioner Selwyn Patterson (Don Warrington), Catherine Bordey (Elizabeth Bourgine)

=== Christmas Special 2023 ===
No. overall	Title	Directed by	Written by	Original release date	UK viewers (millions)
7	"Christmas Special 2023"	Sandy Johnson	Tony Jordan	24 December 2023	6.20
Under threat of the police station being closed Humphrey and Esther are under pressure to solve four house break-ins when nothing was taken; however, a small pile of ash was left at each scene. At one break-in a gold bracelet was found on the floor. Kelby, looking for a connection between the scenes of crime, discovers each property had been burgled in the week prior to Christmas 50 years ago. A suspect then was interviewed and released due to lack of evidence. Kelby also is looking after a small boy caught shoplifting refusing to give his name. While awaiting social services Martha takes an interest. The boy does not want to go home because his mother took his mobile phone which he used to talk to his grandfather from whom his mother had become estranged when her husband died. All the threads come together and Humphrey receives some Christmas cheer from Chief Superintendent Charlie Woods.

=== Series 2 (2024) ===
No. overall	No. in series	Title	Directed by	Written by	Original release date	UK viewers (millions)
8	1	"Episode 1"	Claire Tailyour	Tony Jordan	22 March 2024	6.16
Humphrey and Esther are standing in for players on a heritage railway murder mystery trip rehearsal for the Shipton Abbott Players organised by Margo. After the train slows to enter a tunnel, the actor playing the victim is found murdered; he had been stabbed in the back but there is no blood present at the scene. The victim had recently moved to Shipton Abbott after inheriting a house, but Humphrey and Esther initially find no details of his past life. The only suspects are the other four players, one of whom is married to the train driver. Humphrey's priority is to discover who the victim was and if he had any connection with the suspects before Superintendent Woods moves the investigation to the Devon Police central hub. Meanwhile, Martha is concerned about her mother's on-line dating and who she is going to meet. Features a posthumous tribute to crew member Dave Thacker, who was a sound recordist and boom operator.
9	2	"Episode 2"	Claire Tailyour	Kat Rose-Martin	29 March 2024	5.65
Martha and her old schoolfriend, Belle Hammond, whose grandfather had recently died, visit a medium, Claire Moss. Moss receives messages from Hammond's grandfather with warnings that subsequently become true. Humphrey and Esther investigate, with the former being open-minded and the latter sceptical. When Hammond is assaulted and robbed, Humphrey realises what is happening and why, when the victim shows him photographs of the items stolen. Martha and Humphrey undergo interviews from social services representative Hannah Owen about becoming foster parents. Martha's mother, Anne, has another internet date, this time with Richard. Esther's scepticism is put to the test.
10	3	"Episode 3"	Sandy Johnson	Tony Jordan; Story by : Rebecca Wojciechowski	5 April 2024	5.22
Widow Maisie Morgan, who has a terminal illness, disappears from a fishing boat, crewed by her three stepsons, leaving only her scarf tied to the bow rail and her shoes on deck with a suicide note. Maisie's brother, Jamie, was once married to Margo. Maisie's fingerprints on the bow rail arouse Humphrey's suspicions and her fingerprints on the side rails initially point to suicide. Maisie's will, leaving everything to her estranged daughter by a previous marriage, and her three step-sons, equally cause dissent among the family. Harbour CCTV confirm Humphrey's theory about the fingerprints. Humphrey and Martha have a second interview on the boat from social services worker Hannah Owen which leads to major changes for Martha's mother, Anne, and a proposal. Anne has a second date with Richard and invites him, after a meal, into her house for a nightcap.
11	4	"Episode 4"	Sandy Johnson	Ian Jarvis	12 April 2024	5.57
Humphrey and Esther investigate the disappearance of Father Michael, a Catholic priest, teacher, and house master at an exclusive boarding school for boys. They discover that Father Michael had been acting strangely in recent days, disappearing at midnight to Cannon's Cove, a beach noted for a legend called "the Devil on the Rocks". The investigation includes finding some cash lying on the beach and visiting Old Harry, who lives alone at his farm overlooking the cove. The disappearance of over £10,000 from the school adds to the puzzle. Father Michael is found almost dead in a boat at sea and his mobile phone reveals texts from a Marie Trevelyan who used to be a librarian at the school; texts that began nine months after she left. The last misspelt text luring Father Michael to the beach provides Humphrey with the answer to who is the Devil on the Rocks. The bistro has a break-in and Martha knows the culprit. Anne has a nasty surprise at an art gallery after turning down Richard's invitation.
12	5	"Episode 5"	Steve Brett	Chloe Mi Lin Ewart	19 April 2024	5.53
Niamh Kirby is found unconscious by Rebecca Thompson in open countryside, save for a tree, with an arrow in the back of her shoulder. Humphrey and Esther investigate and Thompson is certain there was nobody in the vicinity when she heard the victim scream. Evidence points to Kirby's brother-in-law Patrick who owns an archery club and land where Niamh Kirby was found he wishes to develop; something Rebecca Thomson is set against. The only other evidence Humphrey has is part of an eggshell found at the scene and wood fibres from the arrow. The case is more harrowing since the victim has early onset dementia and she is convinced Patrick killed her husband, Lewis, ten years before although the police investigation confirmed he left her to go to America. Anne throws herself into planning Martha's and Humphrey's wedding and Zoe has a tattoo that her mother, Esther, strongly disagrees with.
13	6	"Episode 6"	Steve Brett	Tony Jordan	26 April 2024	5.51
With the wedding day approaching Martha has doubts brought about by Martha's mother, Anne, who has organised everything to make it a wedding her late husband would have been proud of. During the night before the wedding Shipton Abbott's museum is burgled and a £75,000 statuette stolen without triggering the alarms. Kelby is sent to investigate an assault on an elderly lady by two men and is stunned when Chief Superintendent Woods arrives to see the victim: her grandmother. Kelby is told by Woods that the Police Hub would investigate but Margo convinces Kelby, as first officer at the scene, to stay on the case. Hannah Owen brings a youngster, Ryan, to be temporarily fostered by Martha and Humphrey who don't mention it is their wedding day. Humphrey takes Ryan to the police station and goes through the evidence with Esther regarding the burglary to work out why the alarm didn't go off. Martha's mother cancels all the wedding arrangements, leaving Martha and Humphrey to meet at the beach with Ryan, Anne, Kelby, Margo, Esther and Zoe, and Woods for a non-wedding.

=== Christmas Special 2024 ===
No. overall	Title	Directed by	Written by	Original release date	UK viewers (millions)
14	"Christmas Special 2024"	Claire Tailyour	Ian Jarvis	27 December 2024	5.18
Anne asks Humphrey to look into her friend Bob Holland, widowed in the last year, because he has told her he has seen his wife as a ghost in the night telling him to leave his home. Humphrey is intrigued while Esther is sceptical but they investigate, looking at family members. They find Holland's daughter and her husband are not in agreement over the future of the home; one is for him selling and the other against. Kelby, meanwhile, investigates the disappearance of a mannequin of the Virgin Mary from the local church, knowing that finding it would impress the Chief Superintendent. Hannah Owen brings a teenager, Jaiden, to be fostered over Christmas but his constant use of his mobile phone makes engaging with him difficult until Martha finds out the reason.

=== Series 3 (2025) ===
No. overall	No. in series	Title	Directed by	Written by	Original release date	UK viewers (millions)
15	1	"Episode 1"	Leon Lopez	Tony Jordan	28 March 2025	5.50
16	2	"Episode 2"	Leon Lopez	Tony Jordan	4 April 2025	5.16
17	3	"Episode 3"	Bindu De Stoppani	Alexandra Carruthers	11 April 2025	4.97
18	4	"Episode 4"	Bindu De Stoppani	Martha Reed	18 April 2025	5.11
19	5	"Episode 5"	Sandy Johnson	Miles Sloman	25 April 2025	5.16
20	6	"Episode 6"	Sandy Johnson	Chloe Mi Lin Ewart	2 May 2025	4.88

=== Christmas Special 2025 ===
No. overall	Title	Directed by	Written by	Original release date	UK viewers (millions)
21	"Christmas Special 2025"	Sandy Johnson	Tony Jordan	21 December 2025	5.58
Guest appearance: Commissioner Selwyn Patterson (Don Warrington)

=== Series 4 (2026) ===
No. overall	No. in series	Title	Directed by	Written by	Original release date	UK viewers (millions)
22	1	"Episode 1"	Fiona Walton	Tony Jordan	27 March 2026	4.89
23	2	"Episode 2"	Fiona Walton	Chloe Moss	3 April 2026	4.80
24	3	"Episode 3"	Fiona Walton	Richard Zajdlic	10 April 2026	4.68
25	4	"Episode 4"	John Maidens	Lara Barbier	17 April 2026	4.66
26	5	"Episode 5"	John Maidens	Kevin Cecil and Andy Riley	24 April 2026	4.56
27	6	"Episode 6"	John Maidens	Polly Buckle	1 May 2026	4.80

== Reception ==
Michael Hogan of The Telegraph gave it four stars out of five, proclaiming it "superior to its mothership show" and "Charming, cheerful and just gripping enough, it was the cosy crime treat we didn't know we needed." Jack Seale of The Guardian, conversely, awarded the first episode two out of five stars.

== See also ==
- Polperro
- Fowey
