= Tahj Miles =

English actor

Tahj Di Nero Miles (born 9 August 2001) is an English actor. He appeared in Mangrove, the first film of the anthology series Small Axe directed by Steve McQueen, and between 2021 and 2024, he starred as Marlon Pryce in BBC1's TV series Death in Paradise.

== Life and work ==
Miles was born in Hackney, London, and has Jamaican, Saint Lucian, and Dominican heritage. He attended the Betty Layward Primary in Stoke Newington. He joined the Anna Fiorentini Theatre and Film School at the age of seven, then signed for Fiorentini Agency. Miles performed in a West End production of Oliver!. He joined Disney’s Cub School and performed as Simba in a West End production of The Lion King for over a year. He was then in Matilda the Musical with the Royal Shakespeare Company at the Cambridge Theatre (2013) and Emil and the Detectives with the Royal National Theatre. He also secured advertising contracts with Lego and Sainsbury’s. He appeared in Bugsy Malone in the West End (2015) before studying at the BRIT School of performing arts.

Miles was cast in the BBC series Class Dismissed and Flunked before joining the regular cast of BBC1's Death in Paradise as police officer Marlon Pryce. He appeared in Mangrove, the first film of Steve McQueen's film anthology Small Axe.

Miles lives in Hackney, east London.

== Filmography ==
=== Television ===
Year	Title	Role	Notes
2016–2017	Class Dismissed	Tahj	25 Episodes
2019	Flunked	Tahj	1 Episode
2020	Small Axe	Kendrick Manning	Episode: Mangrove
2021–2024	Death in Paradise	Officer Marlon Pryce	25 episodes
2023	Beyond Paradise	Officer Marlon Pryce	Episode: "#1.6"
2024	Mr Loverman	Daniel	
