= Humphrey Goodman =

Fictional character from the television series Death in Paradise

Humphrey Algernon Goodman
- Death in Paradise and Beyond Paradise character
- Kris Marshall as Humphrey Goodman
- First appearance: Death in Paradise; 14 January 2014; Beyond Paradise; 24 February 2023
- Last appearance: Death in Paradise; 9 February 2017
- Portrayed by: Kris Marshall

In-universe information
- Occupation: Detective Inspector
- Spouses: Sally Goodman (divorced); Martha Goodman (wife)
- Relatives: Martin Goodman (father); Mary Goodman (aunt); Rosann Lloyd (mother-in-law)
- Duration: 2014–2017 (Death in Paradise); 2023–present (Beyond Paradise)

Detective Inspector Humphrey Goodman is a character in the crime drama television series Death in Paradise and Beyond Paradise, portrayed by Kris Marshall.

== Description ==
Goodman is assigned to Saint Marie after the murder of D.I. Richard Poole at the start of Series 3. Clues from Poole's investigation helped Goodman reveal the motive and the killer's identity; Goodman commented that DI Poole had 'solved his own murder.' Goodman stayed in Saint Marie after his wife Sally (Morven Christie) announced she would not be joining him on the Caribbean island. Subsequently his father Martin Goodman (James Fox) visited the island in the hope of persuading him to reconcile with Sally, but was unable to do so.

He became the chief inspector on the island, and took to Poole's old routine of announcing the murderer in front of all the suspects and his police team. He is very disorganized, often forgetting things or finding himself with nothing to take notes on; he enjoys Caribbean life much more than his predecessor. He has a talent for being able to solve murders instantly, looking at the meaning of small details, much like his predecessor.

He fell in love with his detective sergeant, Camille Bordey, coming close to revealing his feelings for her during Series 4. He attempted to prevent her leaving when she requested a job in Paris, but stopped himself. He shared a passionate kiss with her just before she left the island in Series 4 Episode 4. He had a more cordial and friendly relationship with her successor, Florence Cassell (Joséphine Jobert), often sharing jokes together. Goodman and Cassell dedicate a drink to Camille after their first solved case.

During the fifth season, a running sub-plot involved Goodman attempting to get a girlfriend, but his results were various degrees of failure until he ran into Martha (Sally Bretton), a woman who once ran a sandwich shop he frequented when he worked in London, in the season finale. In the sixth season, Martha returns to the island for a few weeks, but while she and Goodman enjoy their time together, she eventually returns to London to start her dream job at a new restaurant. When a subsequent case sends Goodman and his team to London to track their suspects, he is prompted to stay with Martha, nominating the recently widowed DI Jack Mooney – the team's London liaison for their latest case – as his successor in Saint Marie. He left in Series 6 Episode 6 (2017).

Goodman has been described as "coincidentally awkward" and "accident-prone". Michael Hogan argues that "his bumbling and stammering resemble a Hugh Grant impersonation."

== Spin-off - Beyond Paradise ==
On 28 June 2022, it was announced by the BBC that a spin-off had been greenlit, commissioned by the BBC and BritBox International. The series, titled Beyond Paradise, will "pick up Humphrey and Martha’s story as they navigate a new life together in the idyll of rural Britain." Its first episode was broadcast on BBC1 on 24 February 2023 and the first season concluded on 7 April 2023, after six episodes, with a Christmas special broadcast on 24 December 2023.

The second season of six episodes was broadcast between 22 March and 26 April 2024, with a Christmas special broadcast on 27 December 2024.

The third season of six episodes was broadcast between 28 March and 2 May 2025, with a Christmas special broadcast on 21 December 2025.

The fourth season of six episodes was broadcast between 27 March and 1 May 2026.
