= Richard Poole (character) =

Fictional character from the television series Death in Paradise

- Death in Paradise character
- Ben Miller as Richard Poole
- First appearance: Series 1, Episode 1
- Last appearance: Series 3, Episode 1 (Regular) Series 10, Episode 6 (Guest)
- Portrayed by: Ben Miller

In-universe information
- Occupation: Detective Inspector
- Duration: 2011–2014, 2021

Detective Inspector Richard Poole is a character in the crime drama television series Death in Paradise, portrayed by Ben Miller. Poole also appears in novels based on the TV series written by Robert Thorogood.

== Description ==
A British police inspector assigned to Saint Marie to investigate the previous inspector's murder, Poole was instructed to remain on the island as the new detective inspector. Despite his dislike for the island and inexperience with tropical weather – to the point where he continued to wear his old suits – he often showed himself to be a psychological genius, making decisions based on minimal information and random events, and favoured making arrests by addressing all the suspects at once before identifying the killer.

In series 2 he became somewhat more content with island life. He recommended a colleague, Fidel, for the sergeant's exam. Despite their frequent arguments over his dislike for the island and the French, his detective sergeant, Camille Bordey, developed romantic feelings for him as indicated in "A Murder on the Plantation", Her mother, Catherine, had arranged a blind date during the Erzulie celebrations at which Camille briefly mistook Poole for her date. She seemed happy until her mistake was realized. Ending the series, Poole briefly returned to London, but, in spite of his dislike for Saint Marie, he chose to return.

Poole was murdered in the first episode of series 3, at a Cambridge University reunion, by a fellow student when he threatened to expose her identity theft. He was succeeded by DI Humphrey Goodman.

Poole makes a brief guest cameo in Series 10, Episode 6 when Camille returned to the island briefly to help on a case and due to her mother Catherine being admitted to hospital after being attacked, leaving her close to death from a head trauma. Appearing as a manifestation of her subconscious, he tells her to not dwell on neglecting to visit Catherine since leaving the island and encourages her to spend more time with Catherine.

Poole is an "English eccentric with a hatred for island life". According to Michael Hogan, Poole "harrumphs around Hugh Grant-ishly in his uptight Brit suit and carries a briefcase, endlessly dabbing at his forehead with a hankie." Hogan goes on to argue that Poole is a "bland blend of several dozen quirky screen sleuths: a bit of Morse here, a dash of Columbo there, a pinch of Precious Ramotswe and a lug of Jonathan Creek to taste." The episode "An Unholy Death" reveals that he suffers from "sphenisciphobia" (an irrational fear of nuns) as a result of a painful experience during his school days.
