= Kara (name) =

- Gender: Feminine
- Language: Various

Origin
- Meaning: Various

Kara is both a given name and a surname with various, unrelated origins in various cultures.

As an English name, it is usually considered a modern spelling variant of the Italian endearment cara, meaning beloved, or the Irish word cara, meaning friend. Neither Cara nor Kara has been in common use as a name in Italy or Ireland prior to the 20th century, though Kara had been in use as an independent name in the United States since at least the 1890s. It had occasionally been used as a hypocorism for the name Caroline. Actress Bernice Kamiat, who used the stage name Cara Williams, popularized that version of the name in the 1950s and 1960s. The DC Comics character Supergirl, whose original name was Kara Zor-El, debuted in 1959. Both Cara and Kara were used regularly in the Anglosphere and have been regarded as spelling variants of the same name. Kara became the more popular version of the name for American girls by 1967. Other media depictions of Supergirl have continued to draw attention to the name. In Norse mythology, Kára was a valkyrie; in the Scandinavian languages, the name Kára either means "the wild, stormy one" (based on Old Norse afkárr, meaning "wild") or "curl" or "the curly one" (from Old Norse kárr).

== Given name ==
- Kara Kennedy Allen (1960–2011), professional board member and a television producer
- Kara Arslan (r. 1144–1174 CE), Turkic rulers
- Kara Bajema (born 1998), American volleyball player
- Kara Braxton (1983–2026), American basketball player
- Kara Brock (born 1974), American actress
- Kara Mahmud Bushati (1749–1796), noble of the Bushati family
- Kara Cook, Australian politician
- Kara Cooney, American Egyptologist, archaeologist, professor
- Kara Corcoran, American military officer
- Kara Crane (fl. 2006–present) American actress
- Kara David (born 1973), Filipina broadcast journalist and television host
- Kara DioGuardi (born 1970), American singer-songwriter
- Kara Drew, known as Cherry (American wrestler) (born 1975), American professional wrestler, manager, and former WWE Diva
- Kara Eaker (born 2002), American artistic gymnast
- Kara Edwards (born 1977), American voice actress
- Kara Fatma (1888–1955), Turkish heroine
- Kara Goldin (born 1967/68), American businesswoman
- Kara Goucher (born 1978), American long-distance runner
- Kara Grainger, Australian soul blues and roots rock singer-songwriter
- Kara Hayward (born 1998), American actress
- Kara Henderson (born 1973), American sports media personality
- Kara Hultgreen (1965–1994), American aviator
- Kara Karaev (1918–1982), Azerbaijani composer
- Kara Jackson, American poet, singer, and songwriter
- Kara Kennedy (1960–2011), American corporate director and television producer
- Kara Killmer (born 1988), American actress
- Kara Laricks, (born 1973) American fashion designer
- Kara Lawson (born 1981), American basketball coach and player
- Kara Lindsay (born 1985), American theatre actress
- Kara Lord (born 1988), Miss Guyana Universe 2011
- Kara Mbodj (born 1989), Senegalese footballer
- Kara Monaco (born 1983), Playboy model
- Kara Ahmed Pasha (died 1555), Ottoman statesman of Albanian origin
- Kara Mustafa Pasha (1634/5–1683), Ottoman military leader
- Kara Neumann case, in which parents of a sick child treated her with only prayer, resulting in the child's death in 2008
- Kara Nova (active since 2011), American pole acrobat
- Kara Yülük Osman, Turkish name of Qara Osman (before 1400–1435), Turkish ruler
- Kara Ro (born 1975), Canadian boxer
- Kara Robinson, American kidnap victim
- Kara Ross (born 1966/1967), American jewelry designer
- Kara Saun
- Kara Scott, Canadian British TV personality, journalist and poker player
- Kara Stone (born 1989), Canadian video game designer
- Kara Wagner Sherer, American Episcopal priest
- Kara Swisher (born 1962), American journalist
- Kara Taitz (born 1981), American actress
- Kára Temple (born 1991), American beauty queen
- Kara Tointon (born 1983), English actress
- Kara Vallow, American television animation producer
- Kara Wai (born 1960), Hong Kong actress
- Kara Walker (born 1969), contemporary African-American artist
- Kara Warme, American politician
- Kara Wilson (born 1944), Scottish actress
- Kara Winger (born 1986), American track and field athlete
- Kara Wolters (born 1975), American basketball player
- Kara Zediker, American actress

== Middle name ==
- Deborah Kara Unger (born 1966), Canadian actress

== Surname ==
- Abir Kara (born 1983), Israeli businessman and politician
- Ákos Kara, Hungarian parliamentarian
- Anksa Kara (born 1985), Cameroonian-born actress
- Ary Kara (1942–2019), Brazilian politician and sports executive
- Ayoob Kara (born 1955), Druze Israeli politician
- Aytaç Kara (born 1993), Turkish footballer
- Burcu Kara (born 1980), Turkish actress
- Danae Kara (born 1953), Greek classical concert pianist
- Ercan Kara (born 1996), Austrian footballer
- Fatma Kara (born 1991), Turkish footballer
- Handan Kara (1939–2017), Turkish classical music singer
- İlayda Cansu Kara (born 2005), Turkish footballer
- Joseph Kara, also known as Mahari Kara, (c.1065 – c.1135), French Bible exegete
- Kai Kara-France (born 1993), New Zealand mixed martial artist
- Miriam Kara (born 1938), Israeli Olympic gymnast
- Nader Kara (born 1980), Libyan footballer
- Patricia Kara (born 1972), American entertainer
- Princess Kara (born 2000), Nigerian discus thrower
- Rasim Kara (born 1950), Turkish footballer
- Sergey Kara-Murza (born 1939), Russian chemist, historian, political philosopher and sociologist
- Theodore Kara (1916–1944), American featherweight boxer
- Tünde Kara (1974–2019), Hungarian actress
- Vladimir Kara-Murza (born 1981), Russian politician
- Vladimir Kara-Murza Sr. (1959–2019), Russian journalist and TV host
- Anel Karabeg (born 1962), Bosnian footballer
- Osman Karabegović (1911–1996), Bosnian politician

== Mythical or fictional characters ==
- Kára, a valkyrie in Norse mythology
- Supergirl's original Kryptonian name in the comics is Kara Zor-El, and in some of the more recent adaptations of the character she uses "Kara" in her civilian life as well:
  - On the Smallville TV series she was Kara Kent.
  - On Superman: The Animated Series she's not Kryptonian but is still named Kara (In-Ze).
  - Her comic-book alternate-universe counterpart from Earth-2, Power Girl, is Kara Zor-L.
  - On the CW Supergirl series her civilian name is Kara Danvers.
- Kara H. Dela Rosa-Acosta, a character from the Filipino drama series Doble Kara
- Kara Ben Nemsi, in the works of German writer Karl May
- Kara Milovy, Bond girl from The Living Daylights
- Kara Thrace, in the reimagined Battlestar Galactica franchise
- Kara, the Jungle Princess, an Exciting Comics character
- Kara Cupper, a child character in Shining Time Station
- Kara, one of the three android protagonists of the videogame Detroit: Become Human
- Kara, a character Susan Strong's real name in the Adventure Time

== See also ==
- Kara (disambiguation)
- Cara (given name)
- Cara (disambiguation) § People, includes a list of people with the surname Cara
- Kaja (name)
- Karra (name)
