= Cara =

Cara or CARA may refer to:

== Places ==
- Čara, a village on the island of Korčula, Croatia
- Cara, a village in Cojocna Commune, Cluj County, Romania
- Cara Island, off the west coast of Argyll, Scotland
- Cara Paraná River, Colombia
- Cara Sucia River, El Salvador
- Monte Cara, a mountain in the Republic of Cape Verde
- Mount Cara, a peak in Antarctica
- Cara Oasis, or Qara Oasis, Egypt

== People ==
- Cara (given name)
- Cara (surname)

== Arts, entertainment, and media ==
=== Fictional characters ===
- Cara Eisenberg, a character in the American sitcom television series The Hogan Family
- Cara Diana Hunter, protagonist of The Unicorn Chronicles
- Cara (Sword of Truth), a character in Terry Goodkind's Sword of Truth series
- Cara, a character in the OEL manga Next Exit

=== Other arts, entertainment, and media ===
- Chicano Art: Resistance and Affirmation, an influential Chicano art exhibition that toured in the 1990s
- Contemporary A Cappella Recording Award, an award given by the Contemporary A Cappella Society
- "Cara" (Gunsmoke), a 1956 television episode

== Brands and enterprises ==
- Cara (app), an art platform for artists with an anti-AI art stance
- Cara Operations, a franchise which owns restaurant chains

== Organizations ==
- CARA Brazzaville, a football club in the Republic of the Congo
- Center for Applied Research in the Apostolate, a Catholic social science research center located at Georgetown University
- Central Adoption Resource Authority (CARA), an organization within the Ministry of Women and Child Development, Government of India
- Classification and Rating Administration, a division of the Motion Picture Association that administers the MPA film rating system
- Committee for Centers and Regional Associations of the Medieval Academy of America
- Compassion and Responsibility for Animals, a non-profit animal welfare group in the Philippines
- Council for At-Risk Academics, previously Council for Assisting Refugee Academics, a charitable organization

== Other uses ==
- Cara, a synonym for Anadara, a genus of molluscs
- Cara (horse) (1836–1857), British Thoroughbred racehorse and broodmare
- Cara Cara navel orange
- Cara culture, an Andean civilization
- Cara Cup, an international professional rugby union tournament
- Cara language, a small Plateau language of Nigeria
- Combined altitude radar altimeter, a radar altimeter with both analog and digital displays
- Comprehensive Addiction and Recovery Act (CARA), a piece of US federal legislation enacted to fight addiction
- Constant absolute risk aversion, a term in Economics referring to a property of the exponential utility function
- Control of Alien Refugees Act 1960 in Uganda.

== See also ==
- Cara Sucia (disambiguation)
- Caras (disambiguation)
- Carra (disambiguation)
- Chara (disambiguation)
- Kara (disambiguation)
- Khara (disambiguation)
