= Cara (given name) =

- Pronunciation: /ˈkɑːrə, ˈkɛərə/ KAHR-ə, KAIR-ə
- Gender: female

Origin
- Origin: Gaelic
- Meaning: pure, cherished and beloved one
- Region of origin: Ireland

Other names
- Related names: Kara, Caragh, Cheryl, Cherie, Karina, Karine, Katrina, Katharina, Katherine, Catherine

Cara is a feminine given name with multiple origins in different languages. It is often considered a spelling variant of the name Kara. As an English name, it is usually considered a modern spelling variant of the Italian term of endearment cara, meaning beloved, or the Irish word cara, meaning friend. Neither Cara nor Kara had been in common use as a name in Italy or Ireland prior to the 20th century, though Kara had been in use as an independent name in the United States since at least the 1890s. Both forms of the name had occasionally been used as a hypocorism for the name Caroline, as in the case of American journalist Cara Reese (1856–1914), whose birth name was Caroline Reese. Actress Bernice Kamiat, who used the stage name Cara Williams, popularized that version of the name in the 1950s and 1960s.

== People named Cara ==
- Cara Judea Alhadeff, American artist, writer, and yoga teacher
- Cara Black, Zimbabwean professional tennis player
- Cara Black (author), American mystery writer
- Cara Blue Adams, American author
- Cara Buono, American actress
- Cara Butler, Irish American stepdancer and choreographer
- Cara Capuano, American sports anchor for ESPNU
- Cara Carriveau (born 1966), Chicago radio personality
- Cara Delevingne (born 1992), British fashion model and actress
- Cara DeLizia (born 1984), American television actress
- Cara DeVito (born 1951), American video artist
- Cara Dillon, Irish folk singer
- Cara Duff-MacCormick, Canadian actress
- Cara Dunne-Yates (1970–2004), American scholar-athlete
- Cara Feain-Ryan (born 1999), Australian steeplechaser
- Cara Gee (born 1982), Canadian actress
- Cara Gorges (born 1987), beauty queen from Clearwater, Kansas
- Cara Heads (born 1977), American Olympic weightlifter
- Cara Hilton, Scottish Labour Party politician and Member of the Scottish Parliament
- Cara Hoffman, New York City-based novelist and journalist
- Cara Horgan, English actress
- Cara Jones, American singer, songwriter, and voice actor
- Cara Knott (1966–1986), American murder victim
- Cara Lockwood, American novelist
- Cara Lott, pornographic actress
- Cara Loughran (2003–2018), one of the 17 victims who was killed in the Stoneman Douglas High School shooting
- Cara Luft, Canadian musician
- Cara McKee, Scottish politician
- Cara Pifko (born 1976), Canadian actress
- Cara Quici (born 1985), American singer/songwriter
- Cara Readle (born 1991), Welsh actress
- Cara Reese (1856–1914), American journalist
- Cara Seymour (born 1964), English actress
- Cara Theobold (born 1990), English actress
- Cara Tivey, English pianist/keyboardist and vocalist
- Cara Wakelin, Canadian model and actress
- Cara Williams (1925–2021), American film and television actress
- Cara Wrigley (born 1985), Australian industrial designer, design researcher and author
- Cara Zavaleta, American model and reality show guest

== See also ==
- Cara (disambiguation)
- Cara (surname)
- Cari (name)
- Chara (given name)
- Kara (name)
