= David Moorst =

English actor

- Born: 1992 (age 33); St Helens, Merseyside, England
- Education: Cowley International College
- Alma mater: London Academy of Music and Dramatic Art
- Occupation: Actor
- Years active: 2014 - present
- Television: Bridgerton (Series 4)

David Moorst (/moːrst/) is an English actor. His stage performances have earned him an Evening Standard Theatre Award and a Critics' Circle Theatre Award, as well as an Olivier Award nomination. On television, he is best known for portraying Alfie in Series 4 of Bridgerton (2026).

== Early life and education ==
Moorst grew up in the Haresfinch neighbourhood in St Helens, Merseyside (formerly part of Lancashire). His mother, who is a school administrator, raised him and his elder brother as a single parent. He attended Cowley International College, where he played in a brass band and performed in his school's musicals. He also took part in the National Youth Theatre as a teenager. Moorst took his A Levels in Music, Performing Arts, and Graphic Design before securing a place at London Academy of Music and Dramatic Art (LAMDA), having been encouraged by his teacher to apply for drama school. He graduated from LAMDA in 2014.

== Career ==
Moorst's acting career has spanned across both the stage and the screen. His stage performances, in particular, have earned him positive critical reviews over the year.

Moorst's first stage role after graduating from LAMDA was as apprentice miner Malcolm in Beth Steel's Wonderland, staged at Hampstead Theatre in 2014. Critic Charles Spencer described Moorst's performance as "deeply touching" in his review of the play for The Telegraph. His breakthrough role came the following year, when he starred as teenager Liam in the Royal Court Theatre production of Violence and Son, written by Gary Owen. Writing for The Telegraph, Dominic Cavendish described Moorst as "a complex joy to watch" while The Guardian's Michael Billington praised the young actor for "outstandingly catch[ing] Liam’s mix of smart-arse knowingness, sexual nervousness and aching loneliness". The role earned Moorst the Emerging Talent Award at the 2015 Evening Standard Theatre Awards as well as the Jack Tinker Award for Most Promising Newcomer at the Critics' Circle Theatre Awards the following year. Also in 2015, Moorst had his first musical theatre role, starring as Jack in the production of Into the Woods at the Royal Exchange, Manchester. Though the production overall received mixed reviews, Exeunt Magazine noted that Moorst was "particularly excellent" and WhatsOnStage named the actor as the cast member who made "the most of his role".

In 2016, Moorst appeared in Mark Hayhurst's First Light at Minerva Theatre, Chichester and in the revival production of Shopping and Fucking at the Lyric Theatre, Hammersmith. In 2018, he played Andy in Alan Bennett's hospital drama Allelujah! at the Bridge Theatre, whose premier coincided with the 70th anniversary of the foundation of the NHS. In 2019, he returned to the Royal Exchange in Manchester for Simon Stephens's Light Falls. The production received a 5-star review from The Telegraph, with Moorst's performance described as "superb". The same year, he was cast as Puck in the Bridge Theatre's production of A Midsummer Night's Dream, which required the actor to train in aerial acrobatics at the National Centre for Circus Arts. His performance was positively remarked upon in reviews by The Independent and The New York Times. Moorst later reprised the role when the production returned to the Bridge Theatre in 2025. In 2022, he was cast as Dill Harris in the West End premier of To Kill a Mockingbird, an adaptation of Harper Lee's novel of the same name. The role landed him a nomination for Best actor in a supporting role at the 2023 Laurence Olivier Awards. In 2024, he played Geoffrey in A Taste of Honey at Manchester Royal Exchange. His performance was highlighted in a review by Manchester Evening News as "a heart-breaking and thoughtful piece of acting that starts off comic and becomes something much more interesting".

On television, Moorst has had guest roles in BBC One's Holby City (2014), Partners in Crime (2015), and Killing Eve (2022) and ITV's Grantchester (2016). His breakthrough role, however, was footman Alfie in Series 4 of the Netflix series Bridgerton (2026), where his character quickly became a fan favourite.

Moorst's first major film role was as Joseph in Mike Leigh's 2018 release, Peterloo. He has since appeared in Waiting for the Barbarians (2019), Blitz, and William Tell (both released in 2024).

== Acting credits ==
=== Films ===
Years	Title	Role	Refs
2018	Peterloo	Joseph	
2019	Waiting for the Barbarians	Garrison Soldier 6	
2024	Blitz	Sailor in Bar	
2024	William Tell	Leopold	

=== Television ===
Year	Title	Network(s)	Role	Note	Refs
2014	Holby City	BBC One	Josh Wallace-Jones	Series 17, Episode 7	
2015	Partners in Crime	BBC One	Wilfred	Episode 4	
2016	Grantchester	ITV	Lankester	Series 2, Episode 2	
2020	Secrets of the Dead	PBS / BBC Two	Rudolf Vrba	Season 18, Episode 2; Broadcast in the UK in 2019 under the title 1944: Should We Bomb Auschwitz?	
2022	Killing Eve	BBC One	David	Series 4, Episode 1	
2025	Down Cemetery Road	Apple TV	Sam	Series 1, Episode 1	
2026	Bridgerton	Netflix	Alfie	Series 4, supporting role	

=== Theatre ===
Year	Title	Role	Venue(s)	Refs
2014	Wonderland (by Beth Steel)	Malcolm	Hampstead Theatre	
2015	Violence and Son (by Gary Owen)	Liam	Royal Court Theatre	
2015-2016	Into the Woods	Jack	Royal Exchange, Manchester	
2016	First Light	Alfie	Minerva Theatre, Chichester	
2016	Shopping and Fucking	Gary	Lyric, Hammersmith	
2018	Allelujah!	Andy	Bridge Theatre	
2019	Light Falls (by Simon Stephens)	Steven	Royal Exchange, Manchester	
2019; 2025	A Midsummer Night's Dream	Puck	Bridge Theatre	
2022	To Kill a Mockingbird	Dill Harris	Gielgud Theatre	
2024	A Taste of Honey	Geoffrey	Royal Exchange, Manchester	

== Awards and nominations ==
Year	Award	Category	Nominated work(s)	Results	Refs
2015	Evening Standard Theatre Awards	Emerging Talent Award	Violence and Son	Won	
2015	Critics' Circle Theatre Awards	Jack Tinker Award for Most Promising Newcomer	Violence and Son	Won	
2016	St Helens Star's Pride of St Helens Awards	Arts Award	Body of work	Won	
2023	Laurence Olivier Awards	Best Actor in a Supporting Role	To Kill a Mockingbird	Nominated	
