= Handan (name) =

Handan is a Turkish name. It is the Turkish pronunciation of the Persian word خندان (Khandān) which means "laughing and happy"

Notable people with the name include:

- Handan Sultan (died 1605), concubine of Ottoman Sultan Mehmed III, mother and Valide Sultan of Sultan Ahmed I.
- Handan Biroğlu (born 1981), Turkish Paralympian female archer
- Handan İpekçi (born 1956), Turkish screenwriter and film director
- Handan Kara (1939–2017), Turkish classical music singer
- Handan Kurğa (born 1993), Turkish women's footballer

== See also ==
- Handanovič, Bosnian surname derived from the given name
