= Natalie Dew =

English actress

- Born: 3 October 1987 (age 38); Malaysia
- Education: Guildhall School of Music and Drama (BA Acting)
- Years active: 1999–present

Natalie Dew (born 3 October 1987) is an English actress. She began her career as a child actress. She earned a Laurence Olivier Award nomination for her performance in Bend It Like Beckham: The Musical. On television, she stars in the Gold sitcom Sandylands (2020–) and the cozy mystery The Marlow Murder Club (2024–2026).

== Early life ==
Dew was born in Malaysia to an Indian Malaysian mother and an English father from Wiltshire. She grew up in Devon, attended Blundell's School, and graduated from the Guildhall School of Music and Drama with a Bachelor of Arts in Acting.

== Career ==
At the age of 11, Dew was cast as Karen in the CBBC comedy-drama Monster TV, which aired in 1999. She made her feature film debut in Kiss of Life.

In 2008, Dew made her professional stage debut as Viola in Twelfth Night at Regent's Park Open Air Theatre, for which she earned an Ian Charleson Award nomination. She won third prize the next year's Ian Charleson Awards for As You Like It at the Curve. This was followed by further Shakespeare roles in Hamlet and Romeo and Juliet.

Dew originated the role of Jess in the stage musical adaptation of the football film Bend It Like Beckham, which premiered at the Phoenix Theatre on the West End in 2015. For her performance, Dew was nominated for the 2016 Laurence Olivier Award for Best Actress in a Musical. Also in 2016, she appeared in Human Animals at the Royal Court Theatre and Breaking the Code at the Manchester Exchange, the latter of which won her a Manchester Theatre Award. She went on to play Janelle in the 2018 film Peter Rabbit.

In 2020, Dew began starring as lead character Emily Verma in the Gold sitcom Sandylands. The second series aired in 2021. She also played Alisha Burman in the BBC thriller Roadkill. She joined the cast of The Capture for its second series in 2022 as Aliza Clarke. Recently, Dew has been credited as the voice behind Zara Kahn, the newest recurring character addition to the cast of the long-running FX action/comedy adult animation series, Archer, during its 14th and final season, as well as the series' 1 hour finale, both of which premiered in 2023. In 2024–2026, she starred as DS Tanika Malik in The Marlow Murder Club, the British-American cosy mystery series.

== Personal life ==
Dew lives in London.

== Filmography ==
=== Film ===
Year	Title	Role	Notes
2003	Kiss of Life	Nicky	
2005	3 Minute Wonder	Ruth	Short film
2012	Footprints	Anna	Short film
2012	Lobster	Anne	Short film
2014	Toilets	Link	Short film
2017	We Can Be Heroes	Ameenah	
2018	Peter Rabbit	Janelle	

=== Television ===
Year	Title	Role	Notes
1999–2001	Monster TV	Karen	Unknown episodes
2009	Gavin & Stacey	Doctor Evans	Episode: "Wedding Vows"
2010	Lewis	Sophie Barton	Episode: "Your Sudden Death Question"
2015	The Last Hours of Laura K	Hannah Zacek	Television film
2018	Casualty	Aisha Hassan	Episode: "The Return of Zoe"
2018	Kiri	Georgie	Mini-series; 1 episode
2018	Bodyguard	Reporter	Mini-series; 1 episode
2018	Bad Move	Yasmin	Episode: "Local Hero"
2018	No Offence	Doctor	Episode: "Loyalty"
2020	The Great	Lizaveta	Episode: "Parachute"
2020	Unprecedented	Danielle	Episode: #1.3
2020	Roadkill	Alisha Burman	Mini-series; 3 episodes
2020–2021	Sandylands	Emily Verma	Main role – Series 1 & 2; 6 episodes
2022, 2026	The Capture	Aliza Clarke	Series 2 & 3; 7 episodes
2023	Bodies	Aaliyah Tahir	Mini-series; episode: "You're Dead Already"
2023	Archer	Zara Khan (voice)	Series 14; 9 episodes
2024	Alex Rider	Pritchard	Episode: "Lab"
2024–2026	The Marlow Murder Club	DS Tanika Malik	Main role – Series 1–3; 16 episodes

== Stage ==
Year	Title	Role	Notes
2008	Twelfth Night	Viola	Regent's Park Open Air Theatre, London
2009	As You Like It	Celia	Curve, Leicester
2009–2010, 2012	Arabian Nights	Various	Courtyard Theatre, Stratford-upon-Avon
2011	Hamlet	Ophelia	New Vic Theatre, Newcastle-under-Lyme
2013	Romeo and Juliet	Juliet	Waterside Theatre, Derry / National Theatre, London
2013	Fault Lines	Abi Ahmed	Hampstead Theatre, London
2014	Twelfth Night	Olivia	Everyman Theatre, Liverpool
2014	Teh Internet Is Serious Business	Various	Royal Court Theatre, London
2015–2016	Bend It Like Beckham: The Musical	Jess Bhamra	Phoenix Theatre, London
2016	Human Animals	Alex	Royal Court Theatre, London
2016	Breaking the Code	Pat Green	Royal Exchange, Manchester
2017	Deposit	Rachel	Hampstead Theatre, London
2019	The Provoked Wife	Bellinda / Aqualina	Swan Theatre, Stratford-upon-Avon

== Awards and nominations ==
Year	Award	Category	Work	Result	Ref.
2008	Ian Charleson Awards		Twelfth Night	Nominated	
2009	Ian Charleson Awards		As You Like It	Third	
2015	Evening Standard Theatre Awards	Newcomer in a Musical	Bend It Like Beckham: The Musical	Nominated	
2016	Laurence Olivier Awards	Best Actress in a Musical	Bend It Like Beckham: The Musical	Nominated	
2016	Manchester Theatre Awards	Actress in a Supporting Role	Breaking the Code	Won	
