= 2015 Evening Standard Theatre Awards =

61st Evening Standard Theatre Awards
- Date: 22 November 2015
- Location: The Old Vic, London
- Hosted by: Rob Brydon

The 61st Evening Standard Theatre Awards were awarded on Sunday 22 November 2015 at the Old Vic Theatre in London. Nominations were announced on 2 November 2015. The ceremony was presented by Rob Brydon and co-hosted by Evening Standard owner Evgeny Lebedev, Dame Judi Dench and Sir Ian McKellen.

== Non-competitive awards ==
The Lebedev award went to American composer and lyricist Stephen Sondheim.

The Editor's award, awarded in partnership with The Ivy, went to Vanessa Redgrave.

The V&A's exhibition Alexander McQueen: Savage Beauty won the Beyond Theatre award.

== Winners and nominees ==
| Best Play | Best Musical |
|---|---|
| The Motherfucker with the Hat by Stephen Adly Guirgis, National Theatre's Lyttelton; Hangmen by Martin McDonagh, Royal Court Theatre; The Father by Florian Zeller, translated by Christopher Hampton, Ustinov Bath, Tricycle Theatre & Wyndham's Theatre | Kinky Boots, Adelphi Theatre; Assassins, Menier Chocolate Factory; Beautiful: The Carole King Musical, Aldwych Theatre; Bend It Like Beckham: The Musical, Phoenix Theatre; Gypsy, Savoy Theatre |
| Best Actor | Natasha Richardson Award for Best Actress |
| James McAvoy, The Ruling Class, Trafalgar Studios; Simon Russell Beale, Temple, Donmar Warehouse; Kenneth Cranham, The Father, Ustinov Bath, Tricycle Theatre & Wyndham's Theatre; Ralph Fiennes, Man And Superman, National Theatre's Lyttelton | Nicole Kidman, Photograph 51, Noël Coward Theatre; Denise Gough, People, Places and Things, National Theatre's Dorfman; Gugu Mbatha-Raw, Nell Gwynn, Shakespeare's Globe; Lia Williams, Oresteia, Almeida Theatre & Trafalgar Studios |
| Best Musical Performance | Milton Shulman Award for Best Director |
| Imelda Staunton, Gypsy, Savoy Theatre; Katie Brayben, Beautiful: The Carole King Musical, Aldwych Theatre; Rosalie Craig, City of Angels, Donmar Warehouse; Killian Donnelly, Kinky Boots, Adelphi Theatre | Robert Icke, Oresteia, Almeida Theatre & Trafalgar Studios; Jamie Lloyd, Assassins, Menier Chocolate Factory; Indhu Rubasingham, The Motherfucker with the Hat, National Theatre's Lyttelton |
| Best Design | Charles Wintour Award for Most Promising Playwright |
| Anna Fleischle, Hangmen, Royal Court Theatre; Tim Hatley, Temple, Donmar Warehouse; Robert Jones, City of Angels, Donmar Warehouse | Molly Davies, God Bless The Child, Royal Court Upstairs; Alistair McDowall, Pomona, Orange Tree Theatre & National Theatre's Temporary Space; Diana Nneka Atuona, Liberian Girl, Royal Court Upstairs (Peckham & Tottenham pop-up venues) |
| Emerging Talent Award | Newcomer in a Musical |
| David Moorst, Violence And Son, Royal Court Upstairs; Calvin Demba, The Red Lion, National Theatre's Dorfman; Patsy Ferran, Treasure Island, National Theatre's Olivier | Gemma Arterton, Made in Dagenham, Adelphi Theatre; Ellie Bamber, High Society, The Old Vic; Natalie Dew, Bend It Like Beckham: The Musical, Phoenix Theatre |

- The Best Musical award was awarded in partnership with BBC Radio 2 and voted for by the public.
- The Emerging Talent Award was awarded in partnership with Burberry.

== See also ==
- 2015 Laurence Olivier Awards
