= Cara Sucia =

Cara Sucia (dirty face in Spanish) may refer to:

- Cara Sucia (Mesoamerican site), an archaeological site in El Salvador
- Cara sucia (TV series), a Venezuelan soap opera
- Cara Sucia River, a river in El Salvador
- "Casimiro Alcorta" ("Cara Sucia"), a tango song written in 1884 by Casimiro Alcorta
