= Handan (disambiguation) =

Handan is a prefecture-level city in Hebei, China.

Handan may also refer to:

- Handan (name), Turkish name
- Handan Sultan - concubine of Ottoman Sultan Mehmed III, mother and Valide Sultan of Ahmed I.
- Handan County, in Handan, Hebei, China
- Chinese frigate Handan (579), a Type 054A frigate of the People's Liberation Army Navy commissioned in 2018
