= Carra =

Carra may refer to:

== People ==
- Alexis Carra (born 1990), French footballer
- Carlo Carrà (1881–1966), Italian futurist painter
- Claude Carra Saint-Cyr (1760–1834), French general and diplomat
- Gian-Carlo Carra, Canadian municipal politician
- Gloria Carrá (born 1971), Argentinian actress
- Jean-Louis Carra (1742–1793), French activist and politician
- Kevin McCarra (born 1958), Scottish sportswriter
- Lawrence Carra (1909–2006), American drama professor
- Lucille Carra, American documentary film director, producer, and writer
- Raffaella Carrà (1943–2021), Italian entertainer
- Nickname of Jamie Carragher (born 1978), English association footballer

== Places ==
- Carra, County Mayo, an Irish village and barony
- Lough Carra, an Irish lake in County Mayo

== See also ==
- Cara (disambiguation)
- Carras (disambiguation)
- Caragh, a village in County Kildare, Ireland
- Carry (disambiguation)
