= Hint (brand) =

American beverage company

Hint Water Inc.
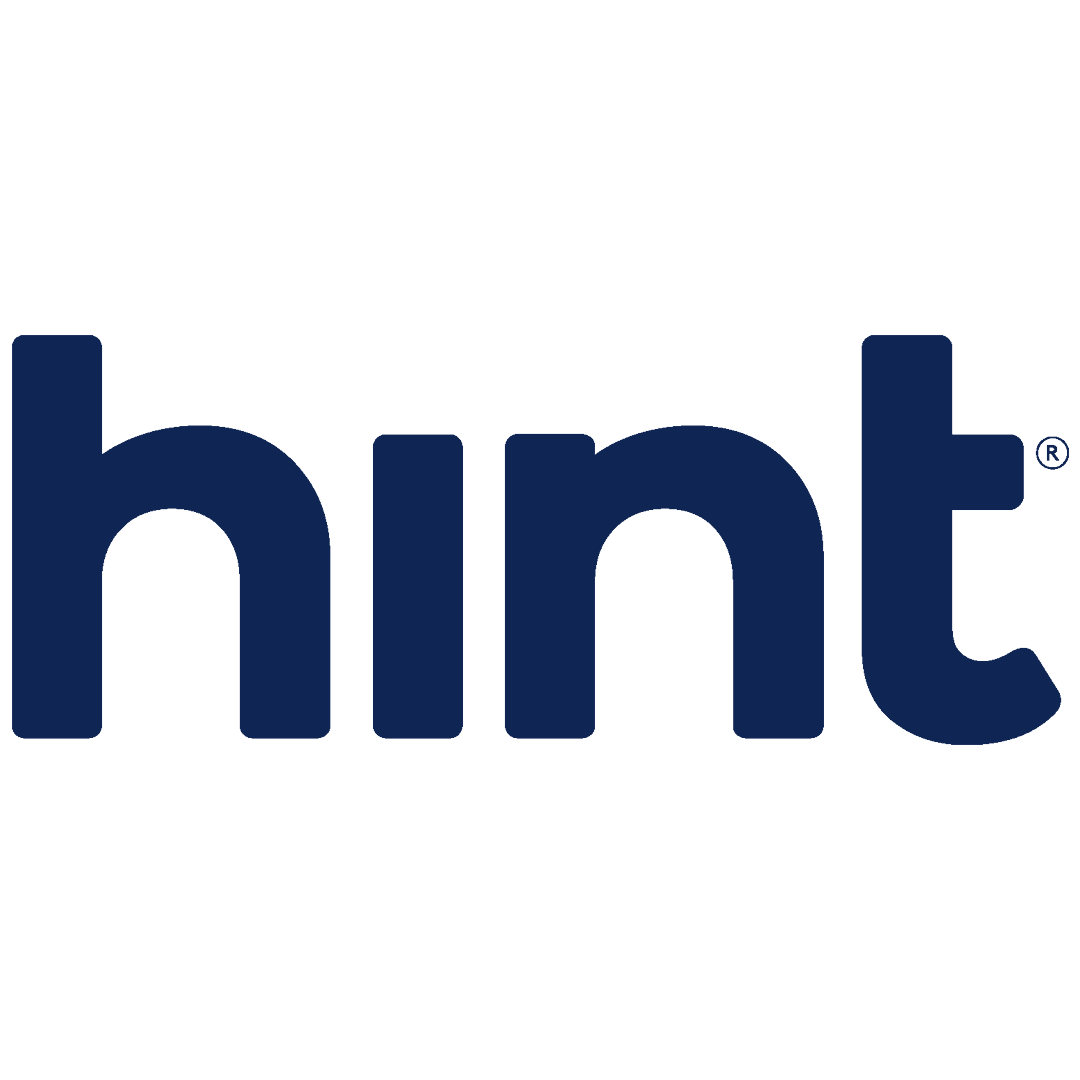
- Industry: Flavored Water
- Founded: 1 January 2010
- Founder: Kara Goldin
- Headquarters: San Francisco, California, United States
- Area served: United States
- Key people: Kara Goldin (Founder), Theo Goldin (CoFounder)
- Website: Official website

Hint Water is an American beverage company based in San Francisco, California, as an alternative to soda and sugar beverages. It was started by former AOL employee Kara Goldin.

== History ==
Hint Water was developed in 2004 when its founder, Kara Goldin, was unhappy with the sugar and preservatives in her juices. Goldin created the drink in her own home and sold it from her garage. She was diagnosed with gestational diabetes when pregnant, which also led her to develop a sugar-free alternative drink. Goldin left her job with AOL to become the CEO of Hint Water and later her husband, Theo Goldin, became the COO.
