= Sandylands =

Television series

- Genre: Sitcom
- Created by: Martin Collins; Alex Finch
- Written by: Martin Collins; Alex Finch
- Directed by: Michael Cumming
- Starring: Natalie Dew; Sanjeev Bhaskar; Harriet Webb; David Walliams; Sophie Thompson; Simon Bird; Bronwyn James; Hamza Jeetooa; Hugh Bonneville; Craig Parkinson; Radha Sthanakiya; Tracy-Ann Oberman
- Country of origin: United Kingdom
- Original language: English
- No. of series: 2
- No. of episodes: 6

Production
- Executive producers: Jo Sargent; Pete Thornton
- Producer: Rosemary McGowan
- Camera setup: Single camera
- Running time: 40 mins
- Production company: King Bert Productions

Original release
- Network: Gold
- Release: 4 March 2020 – 27 October 2021

Sandylands is a British television sitcom created and written by Martin Collins and Alex Finch that began airing on Gold on 4 March 2020.

The series stars Natalie Dew as Emily Verma, who returns to her seaside hometown to attend her father's funeral. The series also stars Sanjeev Bhaskar, Harriet Webb, David Walliams, Sophie Thompson, Simon Bird, Bronwyn James, Hamza Jeetooa, Hugh Bonneville, Craig Parkinson, Radha Sthanakiya and Tracy-Ann Oberman. It is directed by Michael Cumming and produced by King Bert Productions.

== Overview ==
=== Series 1 ===
Emily Verma (Natalie Dew), who fled Sandylands for a more exciting life in London, reluctantly returns for the funeral of her estranged father Limesh Verma (Sanjeev Bhaskar). He is an amusement arcade owner who calls himself Les Vegas and disappeared at sea in a pedalo. She reunites with childhood friends Tina Taylor (Harriet Webb), a tour guide, and Kenny (Hamza Jeetooa), her father's employee, as well as childhood crush Nathan Wild (Simon Bird), a police officer. She is forced to lodge with overbearing bed and breakfast owners Derek (David Walliams) and Jeannie Swallows (Sophie Thompson) after being unable to gain entry to her father's house. Emily soon discovers that her father is alive and had faked his death because he was in debt and hoped to claim on his life insurance. Emily unwittingly becomes his partner in crime as she attempts to conceal the truth from Nathan and his colleague Trudy Wright (Bronwyn James), the other residents, and from a sinister insurance investigator (Hugh Bonneville), who is investigating her father's claim.

=== Series 2 ===
Emily's estranged mother Donna Vegas (Tracy-Ann Oberman), a cruise ship singer, returns and begins to reconnect with her daughter and husband. Emily also begins to grow closer to Nathan and struggles to balance their relationship with her attempts to keep her father's insurance scam secret. Derek and Jeannie Swallows are left reeling after a poor online review from the insurance investigator who had stayed with them in the previous series, and plan a flashy relaunch of their bed and breakfast.

== Cast and characters ==
- Natalie Dew as Emily Verma – a 27-year-old who fled Sandylands for a more exciting life
  - Radha Sthanakiya portrays Emily in childhood flashbacks
- Sanjeev Bhaskar as Limesh "Les Vegas" Verma – Emily's estranged father, an amusement arcade owner
- Harriet Webb as Tina Taylor – Emily's childhood friend, a hedonistic tour guide
- David Walliams as Derek Swallows – an overbearing bed and breakfast owner
- Sophie Thompson as Jeannie Swallows – Derek's wife
- Simon Bird as Nathan Wild – Emily's old crush, a police officer
- Bronwyn James as Trudy Wright – Nathan's militant colleague (series 1)
- Hamza Jeetooa as Kenny – Emily's old friend, who works in Les' arcade (series 1)
- Hugh Bonneville as the one-eyed man – a sinister insurance investigator (series 1)
- Craig Parkinson as Terry Chino – a nightclub owner
- Tracy-Ann Oberman as Donna Vegas – Emily's estranged mother and Les' estranged wife (series 2)

== Production ==
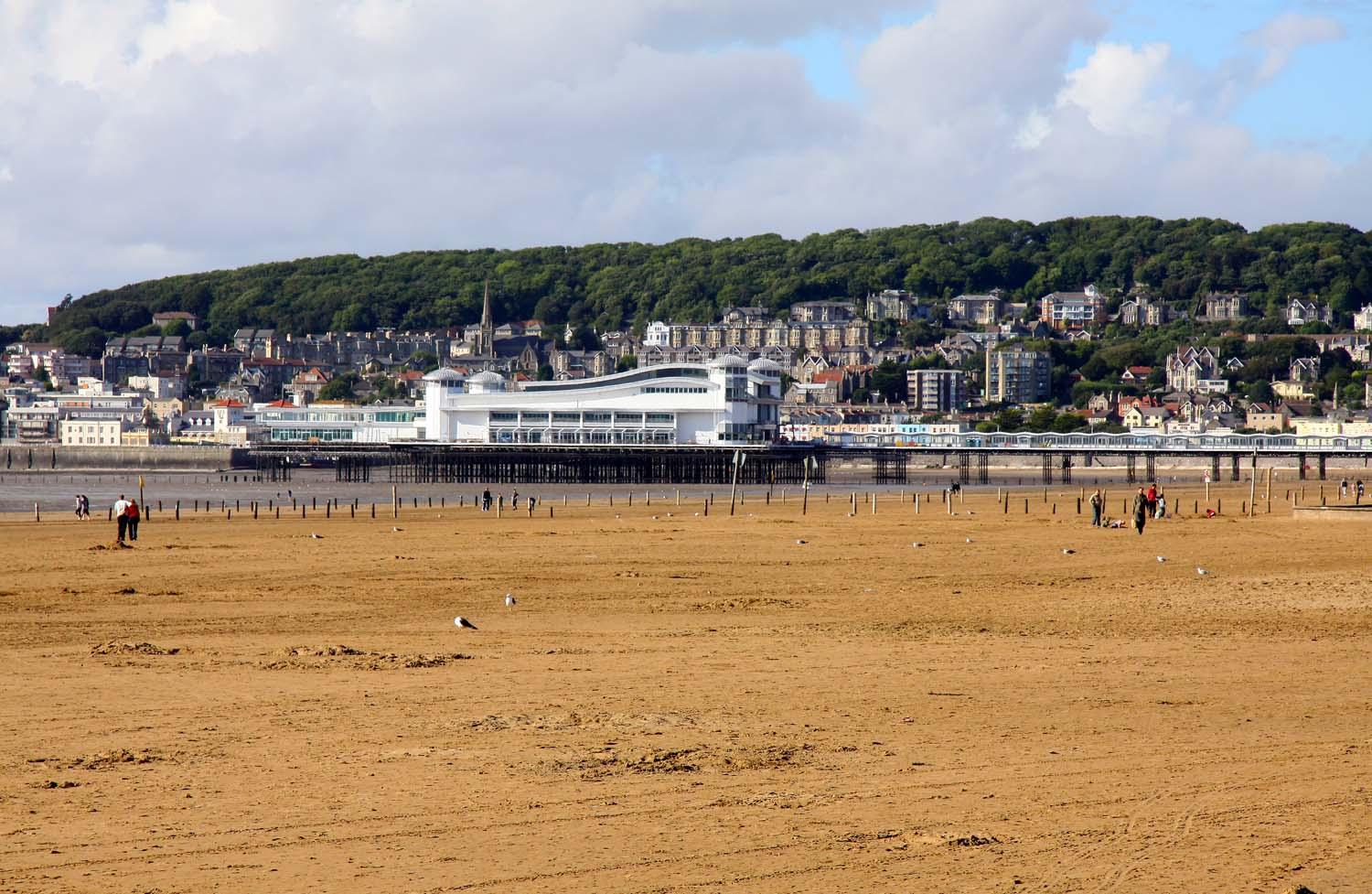
Weston-super-Mare, filming location for the series

The series is principally filmed in the seaside town of Weston-super-Mare, Somerset. The first series was filmed in the town in autumn 2019. The second series was filmed in spring 2021.

== Reception ==
Rupert Hawksley of the i called the series "camp and gaudy with plenty of oo-er humour" and remarked, "Emily’s confusion between grief and anger over her father’s disappearance was cleverly handled by [the writers], who managed to wring out just the right amount of emotion, never dampening the jaunty, end-of-the-pier feel". Alex Fletcher of BT praised the cast and described the series as "a deliciously bonkers escape to seaside nostalgia".
