= Robert Thorogood =

English screenwriter and novelist

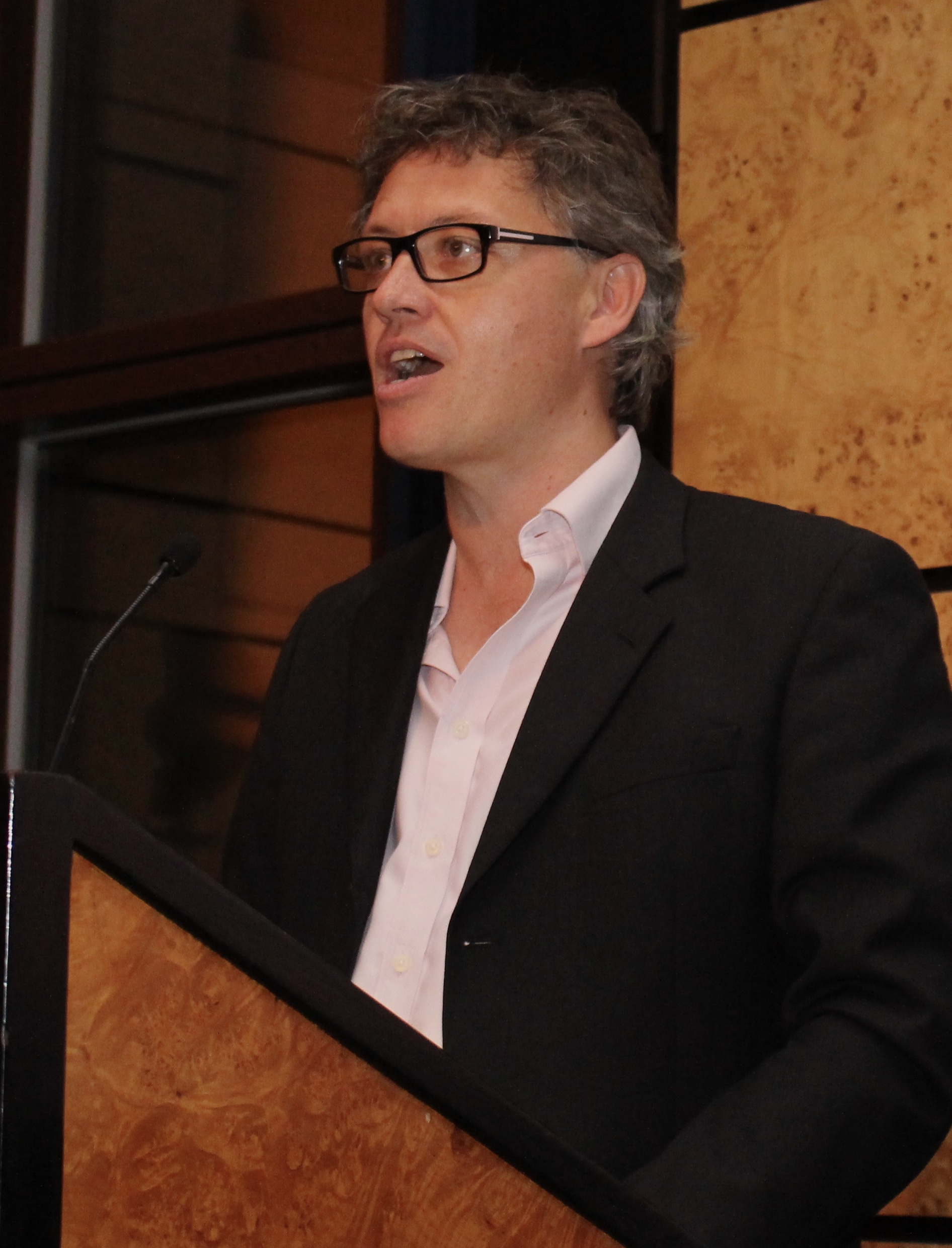
- Thorogood at the CWA Awards, 2017
- Born: 18 January 1972 (age 54); Colchester, Essex, England
- Education: Downing College, Cambridge
- Occupations: Author, screenwriter
- Known for: Death in Paradise; Beyond Paradise; Return to Paradise; Trackers; The Marlow Murder Club

Robert Thorogood (born 18 January 1972 in Colchester, Essex) is an English screenwriter and Sunday Times and USA Today Bestselling novelist. He created the BBC One murder mystery series Death in Paradise as well as co-created two spin-off shows from it, Beyond Paradise and Return to Paradise. Since then, he's written The Marlow Murder Club series of murder mystery novels, which he turned into a TV series for PBS and UKTV.

He won France Film's "En Route to France" award in 2012.

== Early life ==
Thorogood was educated at Uppingham School in Rutland where he met his future wife, Classic FM presenter Katie Breathwick.

He read History at Downing College, Cambridge, where he toured with the university's student comedy troupe Footlights in 1993 and was elected president in 1994. Soon after leaving Cambridge, Thorogood set up a theatre company that toured small theatres and schools, the highlight of which was a production of Molière's The Miser that he directed and acted in alongside Robert Webb, David Mitchell and Olivia Colman.

== Writing career ==
Thorogood wrote for many years – offering scripts to the BBC, ITV and independent film companies – but before 2011 the only script of his that was actually produced was a Radio 4 afternoon drama play called From Abstraction, about the life of mathematician Paul Wolfskehl.

In 2008, Thorogood entered the inaugural Red Planet Prize and was a chosen finalist, where he was able to pitch his 'Copper in the Caribbean' idea to Tony Jordan. In 2011, the show was finally broadcast.

=== Death in Paradise ===
Thorogood wrote five episodes of the first series of Death in Paradise. The first episode aired in November 2011 to an overnight audience of nearly 6 million. The first episode of the second series aired in 2013 to an overnight audience of nearly 7 million. Thorogood also wrote two episodes of the second series, three of the third series, two of the sixth and seventh series, and one episode in each of the others up until series nine.

==== Spin-off novels ====
In January 2014, it was announced that Thorogood had signed a deal with MIRA / Harlequin to write three Richard Poole Murder Mystery novels. The first of the three – A Meditation on Murder – was published in hardback in January 2015 and in paperback in May 2015. The second – The Killing of Polly Carter – was published in hardback in December 2015 and in paperback in early 2016. The third – Death Knocks Twice – was published in hardback in July 2017 and in paperback in October 2017. Murder in the Caribbean, the fourth mystery, was published in December 2018.

=== Trackers ===
In 2018, it was announced that Thorogood was showrunning Trackers, a major new TV series set in South Africa, and an adaptation of the novel Trackers by Deon Meyer. Just as Death in Paradise pioneered the first co-production between the BBC and France Televisions, Trackers was the first co-production between M-Net in South Africa, ZDF in Germany and HBO's sister station Cinemax in America.

Just before the last episode aired in South Africa, it was already M-Net's best-performing show of the year.

=== The Marlow Murder Club ===
==== Novels ====
In 2020 it was announced that Thorogood was writing a new murder mystery novel, The Marlow Murder Club. It focuses on a group of older women who form a club to investigate a series of killings in Marlow, Buckinghamshire (where Thorogood now lives with his family). It was published in January 2021 to overwhelmingly positive reviews and was chosen as the Booksellers' Association's Book of the Month. The second book in the series, Death Comes to Marlow, was nominated for an Edgar Award for Best Cosy Crime novel published in the USA in 2022. The third book in the series, "The Queen of Poisons", went straight into the Sunday Times Bestseller charts at number 7.

==== TV Show ====
PBS and UKTV greenlit a television adaptation of The Marlow Murder Club, written by Thorogood and starring Samantha Bond, in June 2023. In March 2024 the series premiered in the UK on the Drama channel. There were two episodes each of 90 minutes. Samantha Bond played Judith Potts with the other two members of the Club, Suzie Harris and Becks Starling, being played by Jo Martin and Cara Horgan respectively.

The TV show was subsequently commissioned for a second series that was shot in Marlow in the summer of 2024, a third series that was shot in 2025, and a fourth series that was shot in 2026. Each series consisted of three separate stories employing the same principal cast, each story comprising two episodes of 45 minutes each.

== Speaking ==
Thorogood was a guest speaker at the 2012 London Screenwriters Festival. Since then, he has spoken about creating international co-productions for the European TV Drama Series Lab in Berlin and at the Totally Serialised TV Festival in London in 2014. He has also been an after-dinner speaker at the Dagger Awards for the Crime Writers Association in 2017 and Bristol Crimefest in both 2018 and 2019.

== Eton Fives ==
Thorogood is an accomplished Eton Fives player and represents North Oxford Eton Fives Club.

== Bibliography ==
Death in Paradise

- A Meditation on Murder (2015)
- The Killing of Polly Carter (2015)
- Death Knocks Twice (2017)
- Murder in the Caribbean (2018)

The Marlow Murder Club

- The Marlow Murder Club (2021)
- Death Comes to Marlow (2022)
- The Queen of Poisons (2024)
- Murder on the Marlow Belle (2025)
- The Mysterious Affair Of Judith Potts (2026)

== Filmography ==
| Year | Title | Credited as | | |
| Year | Title | Writer | Producer | Notes |
|---|---|---|---|---|
| 2011–present | Death in Paradise | Yes | Yes | Creator, writer, executive producer |
| 2019 | Trackers | Yes | Yes | Creator, writer, executive producer |
| 2023–present | Beyond Paradise | Yes | No | Co-creator, writer |
| 2024–present | The Marlow Murder Club | Yes | Yes | Creator, executive producer, adapted from Thorogood's novel |
| 2024 | Return to Paradise | No | Yes | Co-creator, executive producer |
