= Into the Land of the Unicorns =

1994 book by Bruce Coville

- Author: Bruce Coville
- Language: English
- Series: The Unicorn Chronicles
- Publisher: Original Publisher Scholastic; 2018 re-release FCA Press
- Publication date: 1994, new release from FCA Press in 2018
- Publication place: United States
- Media type: Print (paperback)
- Pages: 159
- ISBN: 978-1-93-622377-0
- OCLC: 30398628

Into the Land of the Unicorns is a children's fiction book that is part of The Unicorn Chronicles series by Bruce Coville. The series follows a girl named Cara, whose grandmother gives her an amulet that allows her to pass through into Luster, the land of the unicorns. While there she meets some fantastic creatures who help her on her journey.

== Characters ==
- Cara - A young girl whose grandmother gives her an Amulet to get into Luster. Raised on the run by her grandmother, who is a "Wanderer" between our world and Luster.
- Lightfoot - A unicorn prince who Cara meets soon after she arrives in Luster. He helps Cara get to Summerhaven to see the Queen.
- The Dimblethum - A bearlike person. The Dimblethum saves Cara from a goblin-like Delver as soon as she arrives in Luster. He also assists her on her journey to see the unicorn Queen.
- Thomas the Tinker - A man who drives a wagon that can fold up in his pocket. He has a remarkable talent for fixing things. He encounters Cara and her friends during their journey.
- Firethroat - A dragon who gives Cara the gift of tongues. Wise and philosophical.
- Old One - The Queen of the Unicorns and lives in Summerhaven. She is also known as Arabella Skydancer.
- Squijum - A funny-looking animal (looks a bit like a monkey and squirrel crossed together) who is always comical with Cara and those with her.
- Ivy Morris - Cara's grandmother, also known as The Wanderer.
- Delvers - Goblin-like creatures who live underground, and hate daylight light. They are the sworn enemies of the unicorns.
- Beloved - Cara's paternal grandmother, several generations past, who has a piece of Unicorn horn in her heart. She hates all unicorns because the piece of unicorn horn is constantly causing her pain, and constantly healing her, which makes her immortal.
- Ian Hunter - Cara's father. Cara's father is a Hunter, and therefore one of Beloved's descendants. He works for Beloved and hates unicorns as a result.

== Summary ==
Cara Diana Hunter and her grandmother, Ivy Morris, realize they are being followed on their way home from the library. They duck into a church, but their pursuer follows. Cara is terrified, but her grandmother, Ivy, seems to expect this. Ivy gives Cara her special amulet and instructs her to run to the top of the church tower. She says that when she gets to the top, to clutch the amulet and fall, while saying "Luster take me home" on the 12th toll of the bell. Cara does this, and ends up in a magical forest in a different world called Luster, the home of the unicorns. Cara makes several friends on her way to find the Old One, who is actually the Queen of the unicorns, in order to deliver her grandmother's message.
