= Carras =

Carras may refer to:

- Porto Carras, northern Greece Resort
- Yiannis Carras (1907–1989), shipowner

== See also ==
- Karras
