= The Marlow Murder Club (TV series) =

British TV series

- Genre: Comedy-drama; Mystery
- Based on: The Marlow Murder Club by Robert Thorogood
- Starring: Samantha Bond; Jo Martin; Cara Horgan; Natalie Dew
- Country of origin: United Kingdom
- Original language: English
- No. of series: 4
- No. of episodes: 22

Production
- Production companies: Monumental Television; ITV Studios

Original release
- Network: U&Drama
- Release: 6 March 2024 – present

The Marlow Murder Club is a British-American cosy mystery comedy-drama television series based on Robert Thorogood's series of novels set in the English town of Marlow, Buckinghamshire. The show is co-commissioned by UKTV and Masterpiece, airing in the UK on U&Drama and in the US on PBS, and streaming on U and PBS Passport, respectively.

The first series of The Marlow Murder Club, consisting of a single story in four episodes, was adapted by Thorogood from his original novel of the same name. The second series, which began airing in the UK on 19 March 2025, consists of three two-episodes stories: the first adapted by Thorogood from his sequel novel, Death Comes to Marlow, and the second and third original stories by other writers.

In May 2025, the show was renewed for a third series, following the same three-story format as the second and including an adaptation of Thorogood's third Marlow novel, The Queen of Poisons, which screened on 18 March 2026; The second and third stories are titled Murder in the Dark and An Appetite for Murder, screening on 25 March and 1 April respectively.

In 2026, the show was renewed for a fourth series, again following the same three-story format as the second and third series, including an adaptation of Thorogood's fourth Marlow novel, Murder on the Marlow Belle.

== Premise ==
Following the murder of two people in the Buckinghamshire town of Marlow, three residents form a loose club to investigate. Judith Potts, a retired archaeologist, sets crosswords for the local newspaper. Suzie Harris is a professional dog walker, while Becks Starling, a former music industry executive, is struggling to adapt to her new life as the vicar's wife. Detective Sergeant Tanika Malik, who leads the Buckinghamshire Police's response while DI Gareth Hoskins is on leave, is initially sceptical of the trio, but when they prove themselves apt, she hires them as official civilian advisors.

The women's family lives often provide subplots for the series. Judith inherited her riverside mansion from her late Aunt Jess and was briefly married to a fellow archaeologist decades earlier. Suzie has an 18-year-old daughter by her Jamaican ex-husband, and Becks and her husband, Colin, have a teenage son and daughter. Tanika and her husband, Shamil, have a young daughter, Shanti, and Tanika struggles with feelings of inadequacy as she balances her career with her home life.

== Cast ==
- Samantha Bond as Judith Potts, a retired archaeologist
- Jo Martin as Suzie Harris, a professional dog walker
- Cara Horgan as Rebecca "Becks" Starling, the wife of the town's new vicar
- Natalie Dew as DS Tanika Malik, in charge of the police investigation. She is promoted to Inspector in season 3.
- Rita Tushingham as Mrs Eddingham (regular, series 1; recurring, series 2), a busybody who annoys Becks
- Ian Barritt as Mr Eddingham (regular, series 1; guest, series 2)
- Phill Langhorne as DS Brendan Perry, who tries to undermine Tanika
- Holli Dempsey as DC Alice Hackett
- Tijan Sarr as DC Jason Kennedy
- Ella Kenion as DCI Vicky Greenly, Tanika's supportive supervisor
- Niall Costigan as Rev. Colin Starling, Becks' husband
- Sophia Ally as Chloe Starling (regular, series 1; guest, series 2), Becks and Colin's teenage daughter
- Ethan Quinn as Sam Starling (regular, series 1; guest, series 2), Becks and Colin's teenage son

=== Series 1 ===
- Rufus Wright as Stefan Dunwoody, the first murder victim
- Umit Ulgen as Iqbal Kassam, the second victim
- Daniel Lapaine as Elliot Howard, an antiques dealer and Stefan's nemesis
- Juliet Howland as Daisy Howard, Elliot's wife
- Rishi Nair as Shamil Malik, Tanika's husband
- Phillipa Peak as Liz Curtis, a rowing instructor
- Mark Frost as Danny Curtis, Liz's husband
- Mark Fleischmann as Giles Bishop, a solicitor
- Molly Hanson as young Judith, as seen in flashbacks
- Yiannis Vassilakis as Philippos Kyriakos, Judith's ex-husband seen in flashbacks

=== Recurring ===
- Teagan-Imani as Zeta, Suzie's teenage daughter
- Amelia Valentina Pankhania as Shanti Malik, Tanika and Shamil's young daughter

== Episodes ==
Series overview
Series	Episodes	Originally released
1	4	6 March 2024 (Note: These dates reflect each series' earliest release, on U.)
2	6	19 March 2025
3	6	18 March 2026
4	6	Start date to be announced

=== Series 1 (2024) ===
Series 1 was released as two 90-minute episodes in the UK, but as four 45-minute episodes in the US. It consists of a single serialised story.

No.	Title	Directed by	Written by	Original release date	U.S. air date
1	"Episode 1"	Steve Barron	Robert Thorogood	6 March 2024	27 October 2024 (part 1); 3 November 2024 (part 2)
Part 1: During her daily swim in the River Thames, Judith overhears what seems to be the murder of her neighbour, Stefan Dunwoody, an art dealer. Believing the police investigation to be insufficient, she mounts her own and quickly suspects antiques dealer Elliot Howard, Stefan's longtime nemesis. Becks confirms Elliot's alibi, his presence at parish choir practise, but both women continue to suspect him of wrongdoing. Separately, Suzie discovers the body of her friend and client Iqbal. Part 2: The police investigate Iqbal's murder and find a medallion labeled "Hope" in his mouth. Both Suzie and Becks accept Judith's invitation to join her investigation, despite DI Malik's warnings. They learn that Stefan once ran a scam with Elliot's father and that Iqbal expected to come into money but didn't. Investigating the Nazi-era Luger pistol used to kill Stefan and Iqbal leads nowhere, but Judith interrupts a burglary at Stefan's home, where a painting is stolen. She discovers a medallion labeled "Faith" in the river near Stefan's home, implying that there will be a third murder.
2	"Episode 2"	Steve Barron	Robert Thorogood	6 March 2024 (Note: This episode aired on U&Drama on 7 March 2024.)	10 November 2024 (part 3); 11 November 2024 (part 4)
Part 3: Malik hires the murder club as civilian advisors. They question Liz Curtis, who behaved oddly at Stefan's funeral. She denies knowing Iqbal, but her husband, Danny, tells them that she hired his cab a few days earlier. At Iqbal's house, they find a letter explaining that a neighbour initially left his estate to Iqbal but altered his will, instead leaving it to his solicitor, Giles Bishop. The police suspect Liz is the murderer, but upon arriving to arrest her, discover her murdered with a "Charity" medallion in her mouth. Part 4: Judith pieces together shredded paper Suzie stole from Bishop's office and finds that the supposed witnesses to the altered will died the year before. The club searches a newspaper collection kept by Judith's Aunt Jess, and Suzie discovers that Judith and her then-husband were involved in an archaeological theft decades earlier in Greece. At the same time, Judith finds that Danny, Giles, and Elliot were on a rowing team together in high school. Recalling her complicity in her husband's theft leads Judith to realise that Liz acted strangely not because she was involved with Stefan's death, but because she worried that Danny was. She deduces that the three men were recently reunited by chance and formed a plot to commit murders for one another so each would have an alibi. Danny killed Stefan on Elliot's behalf so Elliot could steal Stefan's painting; Elliot killed Iqbal on Giles' behalf, as Iqbal had discovered Giles' fraud; and Giles killed Liz so Danny could sell their valuable real estate. Danny attempts to murder Judith, but alerted by Becks and Suzie, the police arrive in time to save her and arrest the three murderers.

=== Series 2 (2025) ===
Series 2 consists of three stories, each split into two 45-minute episodes in both the UK and the US.

No. overall	No. in series	Title	Directed by	Written by	Original release date	U.S. air date
3	1	"Death Comes to Marlow"	Steve Barron	Robert Thorogood	19 March 2025	24 August 2025
4	2	"Death Comes to Marlow"	Steve Barron	Robert Thorogood	19 March 2025	31 August 2025
Sir Peter Bailey, a baronet living in Marlow, contacts Judith to request her presence at a party the day before his wedding, fearing "something might happen". During the party, he is killed by a falling cabinet in a locked room. Under pressure from Greenly to treat the death as accidental, Tanika asks the murder club to surreptitiously investigate on her behalf. Meanwhile, Judith also investigates secret messages in the Maidenhead Advertiser's crossword; Suzie deals with her daughter Zeta's departure for university; and Becks and Colin try to plan a date. Guest stars: James Wilby as Sir Peter Bailey; Yuna Shin as Jenny Page, Sir Peter's nurse and fiancée; Tom Stourton as Tristram Bailey, Sir Peter's son; Emily Bevan as Rosanna Bailey, Sir Peter's daughter; Caroline Langrishe as Lady Bailey, Sir Peter's ex-wife.
5	3	"Death on the Close"	Steve Barron	Lucia Haynes	19 March 2025 (Note: These episodes aired on U&Drama on 26 March 2025.)	7 September 2025
6	4	"Death on the Close"	Steve Barron	Lucia Haynes	19 March 2025	14 September 2025
A loan officer with no apparent connections to Marlow is found stabbed in a near-abandoned close in Marlow under redevelopment. The following day, land developer Grace Wellingborough discovers the body of Seb Teller, a petty criminal killed several years earlier. The police and murder club investigate both murders, while Judith discovers her Aunt Jess had a secret love affair, and Becks has secretive meetings with an attractive art teacher. Guest stars: Samantha Womack as Caroline Wingrove; Patrick Robinson as Phil Wingrove, Caroline's husband; Florence Keith-Roach and Andrew Knott as Kerry and Dean Butler, Caroline and Phil's neighbours; Nina Sosanya as Grace Wellingborough, a land developer; Pete Lee-Wilson as John Teller, Seb's father.
7	5	"Sailing Close to the Wind"	Katherine Churcher	Julia Gilbert	19 March 2025 (Note: These episodes aired on U&Drama on 2 April 2025.)	21 September 2025
8	6	"Sailing Close to the Wind"	Katherine Churcher	Julia Gilbert	19 March 2025	28 September 2025
Mr Eddingham discovers a 1,500-year-old skeleton on land owned by the local pub's landlady, Lynne, prompting an archaeological excavation. Across the river, a member of the local sailing club is murdered. At the police station, Tanika tries to avoid Greenly when she learns that Hoskins is planning to return from leave, nullifying her acting status and jeopardising the murder club's future working with the police. Guest stars: Hugh Quarshie as Prof. Darius Gifford, an archaeologist; Dominic Mafham as James Wyckham, the sailing club commodore; Abigail Cruttenden as Hayley Wyckham, James' wife and the club's house manager; Elizabeth Bennett as Ursula Liddington, the club secretary; Ewan Bailey as Gregg Cooper, the club's rear commodore and Tanika's chief suspect; Camilla Beeput as Jackie Tynham, a friend of Suzie's; James Gaddas as Harry Tynham, Jackie's father, also a suspect; Lizzie Roper as Lynne Hawkins, landlady of the Bounty pub; Mark Quartley as Jed Hawkins, Lynne's son.

=== Series 3 (2026) ===
Series 3 consists of three stories, each split into two 45-minute episodes in both the UK and the US.

No. overall	No. in series	Title	Directed by	Written by	Original release date	U.S. air date
9	1	"The Queen of Poisons"	Steve Barron	Daniel Rusteau and Robert Thorogood	18 March 2026	6 September 2026
10	2	"The Queen of Poisons"	Steve Barron	Daniel Rusteau and Robert Thorogood	18 March 2026	13 September 2026
Geoffrey Truman, the Mayor of Marlow, collapses and dies at a council meeting, and it is discovered that he was poisoned with aconite. Guest stars: Peter Davison as Geoffrey Truman; Sarah Alexander as Sophia Hollingbury.
11	3	"Murder in the Dark"	Steve Barron	Amy Reith	25 March 2026	20 September 2026
12	4	"Murder in the Dark"	Steve Barron	Amy Reith	25 March 2026	27 September 2026
Becks' university reunion game of Murder in the Dark takes a dark turn when one of the participants is found stabbed to death. Guest stars: Montserrat Lombard as Una; Harry Enfield as Hector.
13	5	"An Appetite for Murder"	Katherine Churcher	Julia Gilbert	1 April 2026	4 October 2026
14	6	"An Appetite for Murder"	Katherine Churcher	Julia Gilbert	1 April 2026	11 October 2026
An unpopular celebrity chef is stabbed to death in his restaurant kitchen just before his cookbook launch party. Becks has issues with her mother-in-law while an old admirer of Judith returns to see her. Guest stars: Cherie Lunghi as Marian Starling; Susan Lynch as Isla de Souza.

=== Series 4 (2027) ===
Series 4 consists of three stories, each split into two episodes.

- Case 1: Murder on the Marlow Belle – writer Robert Thorogood. A body found in the river connects to the Marlow Amateur Dramatics Society and a local Hollywood star.
- Case 2: – writer Amy Reith. A man dies suddenly at his mother's wake from an apparent allergic reaction, hiding a deeper truth.
- Case 3: – co-writers Thorogood and Reith. A vineyard co-owner is found drowned in his own wine, prompting an investigation into family scandals and personal betrayals.
