= Monster TV =

British children's television series

- A still of the title sequence
- Created by: Jim Eldridge
- Written by: Jeremy Swan
- Starring: John Asquith; James O'Donnell; Sam Green; Natalie Dew; Kevin Hemlall
- Theme music composer: Johnathan Cohen
- Country of origin: United Kingdom
- Original language: English

Production
- Executive producers: Claire Derry; Elaine Sperber
- Producer: Jeremy Swan
- Running time: 15 minutes

Original release
- Network: BBC Two & CBBC Channel
- Release: 10 December 1999 – 2001

Monster TV is a children's television comedy drama about three children who run a TV show in their basement called "Monster TV", with monsters Herbert and Rocky as the stars. Little information was published about the show online.

== Cast List ==
- John Asquith as Rocky– Rocky is a monster made of stone, with long green grass for hair. A friend of Herbert, he is one of the stars of Billy, Karen and Terry's TV show "Monster TV".
- James O'Donnell as Herbert– the second star of "Monster TV", a troll-like monster.
- Sam Green as Billy, the producer and director of "Monster TV"; the show is filmed in the basement of his home.
- Natalie Dew as Karen, Billy's friend.
- Kevin Hemlall as Terry Billy's friend.
- Jenny Funnell as Mum
- Luke Sorba as Dad
- Anna Nicholas as Vera Venom – A Medusa-type monster; unlike Herbert and Rocky, Vera was not mean monster, obsessed with fame and fortune, and often trying to appear on Monster TV through trickery.

== Crew ==
- Series creator: Jim Eldridge
- Producer: Jeremy Swan
- Writer: Jeremy Swan
- Executive producers: Claire Derry (Link Entertainment), Elaine Sperber (BBC)
- Directors: Carlene King, Gareth Davies
- Music director: Johnathan Cohen
