= Cara Sucia River =

River in El Salvador

- Location of mouth
- Native name: Rio Car Sucia (Spanish)

Location
- Country: El Salvador
- Department: Ahuachapán

Physical characteristics
- Mouth
  - coordinates: 13°45′37″N 90°02′10″W

Cara Sucia River is a river of El Salvador. It arises in the foothills of the El Imposible National Park and flows westward through the area of Cara Sucia in the Ahuachapán Department region to a bay near El Zapote.
