= Daniel Cara =

Brazilian politician

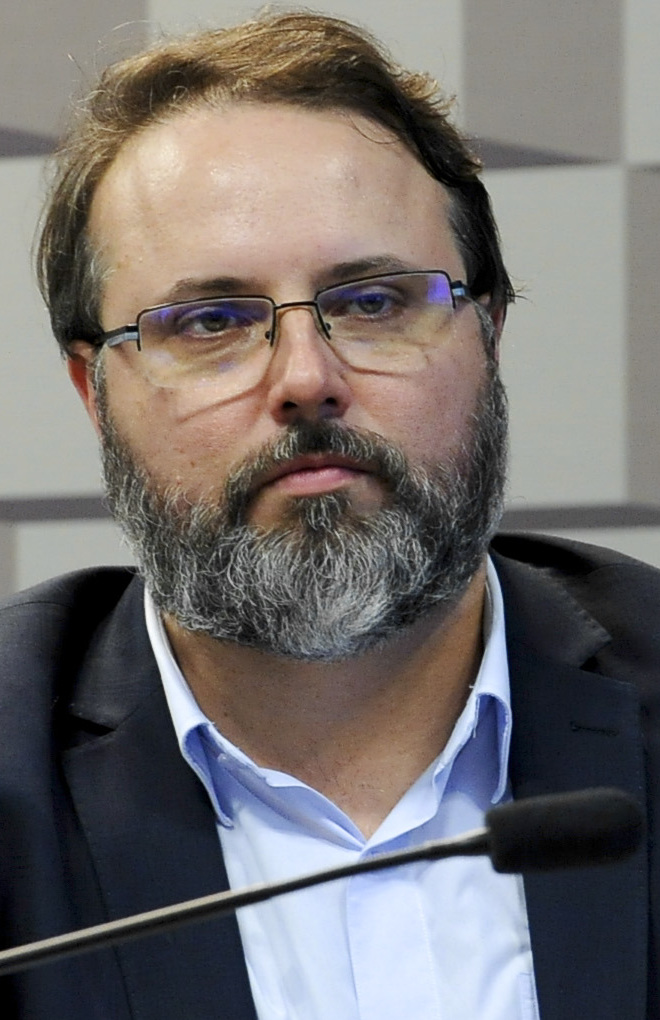
- Born: Daniel Tojeira Cara; January 1, 1978 (age 48); São Paulo, Brazil
- Education: Faculty of Philosophy, Languages and Human Sciences, University of São Paulo
- Occupations: Political scientist Politician

Personal details
- Party: PSOL (2018 - today)

Daniel Tojeira Cara (São Paulo, January 1, 1978) is a Brazilian educator, political scientist, and politician affiliated with the PSOL. He is a professor at the School of Education at the University of São Paulo and member of the Directive Committee of the National Campaign for the Right to Education, civil society network that he coordinated from 2006 to 2020.

In 2018, he was a candidate for the Federal Senate for São Paulo, obtaining 440,118 votes.

He is a member of the University Council of the Federal University of São Paulo (Unifesp), a commentator for DCM TV and TV 247 on YouTube. He had a blog on UOL.

He was the recipient of the Darcy Ribeiro Award in 2015, presented by the Chamber of Deputies on behalf of the National Congress.

== History ==
Since his adolescence, when he was president of the student union XXVIII of March at the São Paulo State Technical School (ETESP), in the 1994-1995 administration, he has been involved in politics, acting early on in the student movement.

As an undergraduate in Social Sciences at the University of São Paulo (USP) (1996-2000) was president of the academic center of the Social Sciences course at USP, the Centro Universitário de Pesquisas e Estudos Sociais Ísis Dias de Oliveira (CEUPES), in the 1998-1999 administration.

He began his activism in youth policies in 1998, and was one of the founders of the National Youth Forum that year. Between 2000 and 2002, he participated in several national and international youth events, having been the Brazilian delegate at the Youth Summit of the Inter-American Development Bank (New Orleans, United States, 2000), at the International Youth Parliament (Sydney, Australia, 2000), Latin American coordinator of the Youth Summit of the International Youth Parliament (2001-2002) and at the UN Youth Summit (Belo Horizonte, Brazil, 2005). From 2005 to 2007, he was Vice-President of the National Youth Council.

In 2006, he became the general coordinator of the National Campaign for the Right to Education, when he began to work more intensely on educational policies. He had a strong participation in the 2008 National Conference on Basic Education (Coneb), and the National Education Conferences (Conae) of 2010 and 2014. He was a full member in the National Education Forum (FNE) from 2010 to 2017.

In the general coordination of the National Campaign for the Right to Education (pt), he represented the network of civil society organizations ahead of the achievement of several advances in the Brazilian educational legislation in the last fifteen years. He acted in the qualification of the texts and for the approval of EC 53/2006 (Fund for Maintenance and Development of Basic Education and Valorization of Education Professionals (pt) - Fundeb), of Law 11.494/2007 (regulation of Fundeb), of Law 11.738/2008 (Law of the National Floor for Teachers), of the Amendment to the Constitution 59/2009, of Law 12.711/2012 (Law of Quotas), of Law 12,858/2013 (Law of Royalties and the Pre-salt Social Fund for education and health), of Law 13.005/2014 (National Education Plan 2014-2024), of the Amendment to the Constitution 108/2020 (permanent Fundeb) and Law 14.113/2020 (regulation of the permanent Fundeb).

Regarding the permanent Fundeb, which ran from 2017 to 2020, he coordinated the advocacy of the National Campaign for the Right to Education in favor of increasing the Union's resources for basic education, the improvement of the distribution system of Fundeb resources, the preservation of the education wage, and the constitutionalization of the Cost Pupil Quality (CAQ). In the regulation of the also called "new Fundeb", he acted in favor of the exclusive allocation of public resources to public schools in primary and secondary education.

In 2015, he was part of the official Brazilian delegation in Incheon, South Korea, at the World Education Forum, promoted by UNESCO, in which the world priorities for education until 2030 were defined. Invited by the then Minister of Education, Renato Janine Ribeiro, Daniel Cara was part of the Federal Government delegation, as a representative of civil society.

He was invited in 2016 by Kailash Satyarthi to coordinate in Brazil the global 100 Million for 100 Million initiative at the Laureates and Leaders Children Summit 2016.

He was recognized as "Education Personality in 2012" in a popular vote promoted by Nova Escola Magazine, with more than 14 thousand participants, ahead of student Isadora Faber, among other public figures, and was pointed out by the magazine as one of the protagonists in the approval of the National Education Plan (PNE) in the Chamber of Deputies that year, during the first phase of proceedings.

== Candidacy for the Federal Senate ==
In the Brazilian general elections of 2018 he launched himself as a candidate for one of the two São Paulo seats in the Federal Senate for the PSOL.
