= Cara (surname) =

Cara is a surname of multiple origins. Notable people with the surname include:

- Alessia Cara, Canadian singer
- Ana Cara, Argentine creolist, translator, and professor
- Cécilia Cara (born 5 June 1984) is a French actress and singer
- Daniel Cara, Brazilian educator, political scientist, and politician
- Gaetano Cara (1803–1877), Italian archaeologist and naturalist primarily interested in ornithology
- Irene Cara (1959–2022), American singer and actress
- Jean-Paul Cara (born 1948), French singer and composer
- Mac Cara (1914–1993), American footballer
- Marchetto Cara (c. 1470 – c. 1520), Italian singer and composer of the Renaissance
- Robyn Cara, British actress
- Albanian family name:
  - Dervish Cara, Albanian revolutionary leader
  - Engjëll Cara
  - Et'hem Cara
  - Igli Cara
  - Indrit Cara
  - Parid Cara
  - Tedi Cara
