= Escola Técnica Estadual =

Type of school in São Paulo, Brazil

Escola Técnica Estadual (ETEC) are higher education institutions belonging to the Centro Estadual de Educação Tecnológica Paula Souza (CEETEPS), managed by the São Paulo State Government.

== History ==
ETECs were designed by Roberto de Abreu Sodré Costa, governor of the state in 1967. In 1969, the network was assumed by the Centro Paula Souza, now there's ETEC 198. The ETEC's are the most prestigious public network of the state of São Paulo.

== Selection process ==
As a way of selecting students is applied a test with 50 questions alternatives, which include materials and themes of the school and also general matters.

== See also ==
- Universities and higher education in Brazil
