= Kara Goldin =

American businesswoman

- Born: Kara Ellen Keenan; 1967 or 1968 (age 58–59); Minneapolis, Minnesota, US
- Education: Arizona State University
- Occupation: Businesswoman
- Known for: Founder and former CEO, Hint Water
- Spouse: Theo Goldin
- Children: 4

Kara Ellen Goldin (nee Keenan; born 1967/68) is an American businesswoman. She is the founder and former CEO of Hint Water, a flavored water brand founded in 2005.

== Early life ==
She was born Kara Ellen Keenan, a daughter of William and Kay Keenan of Tempe, Arizona. Her father worked for Con-Agra, and then for Armour & Company in Phoenix, where he retired as the general manager for distribution, and her mother worked at a local department store. She is the youngest of five children. Goldin grew up in Scottsdale, Arizona, after moving there from Minneapolis when she was three years of age.

Goldin majored in communications and minored in finance at Arizona State University, graduating in 1989.

== Career ==
After graduating in 1989 from ASU, she moved to New York City, after accepting her first job out of college at Time Inc. Goldin worked in circulation at Time Inc. for three years. She started out as an executive assistant and worked her way up to managing the airline circulation for the Time Inc. publications. She then moved on to work in advertising sales at CNN.

Following her move to San Francisco, Goldin began working for a start-up called 2Market, a spin-out of Apple pursuing a computer-based shopping idea that Steve Jobs developed. She was given the position of National Sales Manager for two years until the company was bought out by AOL. Goldin then began working in e-commerce for AOL as the Vice President of Shopping and E-commerce Partnerships while her husband worked for Netscape. In this position she grew AOL’s e-commerce and shopping business to about a billion dollars in revenue. When AOL acquired Netscape in 2001, Kara decided to take a step back from this field of work and focus on raising her family. After having three children, Goldin realized that she wanted to spend her time creating and living a healthy lifestyle. She had trouble losing the additional baby weight and came to the realization that her main problem was that she was addicted to diet-sweetened beverages, which were reinforcing her craving for high-calorie sugary foods.

Goldin then took this idea and launched Hint in 2005 in San Francisco as a healthy alternative to the sugary, diet-sweetened drinks she had been consuming. Hint Water is flavored solely with natural fruit. In the 12 years since its creation, Hint Water has become an asset of the break rooms of some of Silicon Valley’s highest-profile companies, including Google, Facebook and LinkedIn. Hint Fizz carbonated beverage was launched in 2011 and in 2017, Hint began to market sunscreen.

Following her work and creation of Hint, Goldin wanted to share her experiences as an entrepreneur with the world. She created The Kara Network as a place for fellow entrepreneurs to reach out and tell their stories as well as provide some helpful insight to those who were interested in following a similar path.

Kara’s first job was at age 14 working for a local toy store, Alphabet Toys in Scottsdale where after a few weeks, she was asked to help with buying for the entire store. Kara credits this experience with launching her on the path to entrepreneurship.

== Personal life ==
Right before she began working with CNN, Goldin met her husband, Theo Goldin, who at the time was in law school at New York University. They married in 1995 at the Wrigley Mansion in Phoenix, Arizona.

They moved to San Francisco when Theo graduated and they were married shortly after. They have four children together.

== Awards and recognition ==
- Fortune's Most Powerful Women Entrepreneurs (2011)
- Ernst & Young's Entrepreneurial Winning Women (2012)
- Gold Stevie Award Winner for Female Entrepreneur of the Year (2013)
- Forbes' 40 Women to Watch Over 40 (2013)
- EY Entrepreneur of the Year, Northern California (2017)
- Fast Company's'Most Creative People in Business (one of) (2017)
