= Cara Wrigley =

Australian design researcher and author (born 1985)

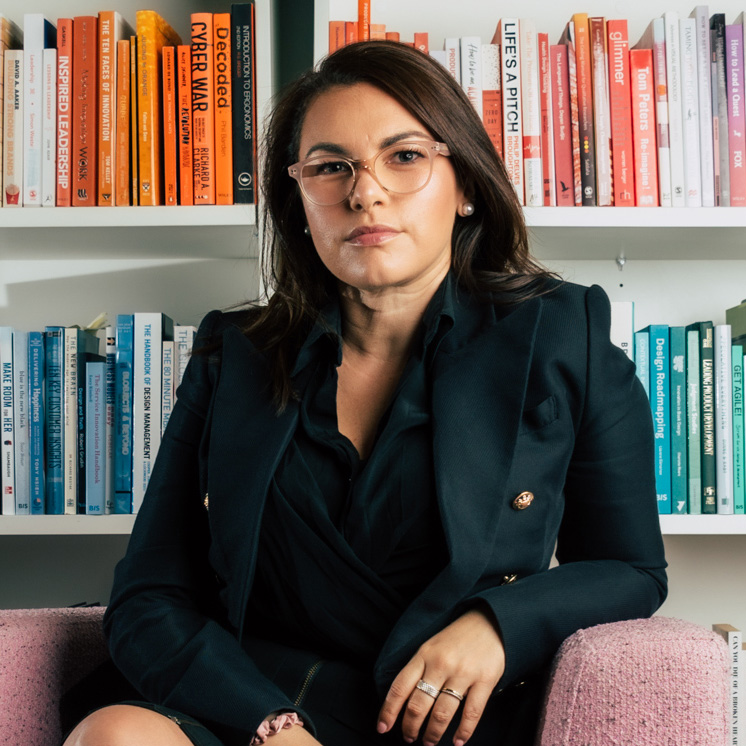
- Born: 18 April 1985 (age 41)
- Occupations: Industrial Designer, Design Researcher, Author
- Known for: Design thinking, design innovation, design education, military design.

Academic background
- Thesis: "Visceral Hedonic Rhetoric" (2011)

Academic work
- Discipline: Industrial Design
- Institutions: The University of Queensland
- Main interests: Design Innovation, Design Education, Business Model Design, Designing Digital Channels, Emotional Design, Medical Design & Innovation, Military Design Thinking
- Notable works: Affected: Emotionally Engaging Customers in The Digital Age, (2018)
- Website: https://www.carawrigley.com/

Cara Wrigley (born 18 April 1985) is an Australian industrial designer, design researcher and author. She is professor of design innovation at The University of Queensland. Her research interests include design thinking, design-led innovation, design education, and emotional design.

== Biography ==
Born in Brisbane, Australia, Wrigley received bachelor's degrees in design studies from the Queensland College of Art at Griffith University (2006) and industrial design at the Queensland University of Technology (2007) and a PhD in emotional design 2011.

In 2012 she started working in the Queensland University of Technology Design School as lecturer of industrial design where she taught on topics such as new product development and design innovation. She held a joint appointment with QUT's Information Systems School.

She was promoted to associate professor in 2016 when she joined the University of Sydney. Her time in the Sydney School of Architecture saw her establish a university-wide design major and a Master of Design Innovation.

In 2019 she was promoted again to full professor where she was appointed as the Royal Australian Air Force Jericho Chair of Design Innovation where she led defence projects.

Wrigley became the professor of design innovation at the University of Queensland in the Faculty of Engineering, Information Technology and Architecture in 2022.

== Work ==
In 2018, the Design Innovation Research Group was established by Wrigley where she led a team of researchers whose purpose was to conduct 'exploratory research' into how design can affect 'people, emotions, strategy and business'.

In 2019 Wrigley was appointed to the position of Jericho Chair of Design Innovation at The University of Sydney. Under her direction, and with sponsorship for the Royal Australian Air force, a multi-disciplinary team conducted research projects which sought to understand how different design processes could accelerate the development of innovative military technology.

This coincided with Wrigley establishing the Defence by Design Group, whose purpose was to apply the research in practical military scenarios. The outcome of this research was the foundation of 'military design thinking'—a theoretical framework which has since been adopted by the Australian Defence Force.

Due to her insight into design for the military, she is a regular guest speaker at the Australian Defence College and the Australian Defence Force Academy.

Wrigley launched the Master of Design Innovation and Strategic Design (2019) curriculum at the University of Sydney. This course was referenced as a case study in the book, ‘Design Thinking Education for Innovation and Impact’ (2022).

Wrigley has received Australian Good Design Awards for her work advising organisations in her role as Chief Investigator on Australian Research Council (ARC) Discovery and Linkage projects.

In addition to her work researching design innovation applications for the military, medical design innovation has been another area of focus of her work. As a result, she has been invited to speak at medical academic conferences around the world, including:

- European Mechanical Circulatory Support Summit (EUMS) Conference (2019, Vienna)
- the American Society of Artificial Internal Organs (ASAIO) 65th Annual Conference (San Francisco (2019)
- the Asia-Pacific Extracorporeal Life Support Organisation (APELSO) Conference (2018).

== Books ==
Wrigley has written or co-authored a total of seven books including Design Innovation for Health and Medicine (2020), Design Innovation and Integration (2021), Affected: Emotionally Engaging Customers in the Digital Age (2018) and the Research Handbook on Design Thinking (2023).

Books
Title	Author/s	Publisher	Date	ISBN
Design. Think. Make. Break. Repeat.	Tomitsch, M., Borthwick, M., Ahmadpour, N., Cooper, C., Frawley, J., Hepburn, L.A., Kocaballi, A.B., Loke, L., Núñez-Pacheco, C., Straker, K., Wrigley, C.	BIS Publishers	18 January 2018	9789063695859
Affected: Emotionally Engaging Customers in The Digital Age	Cara Wrigley and Karla Straker	Wiley	May 2018	978-0-730-35701-8
Design Innovation for Health and Medicine	Cara Wrigley, Erez Nusem, and Karla Straker	Palgrave Macmillan	5 September 2020	978-981-15-4362-3
Design Innovation and Integration	Karla Straker, Cara Wrigley and Erez Nusem	BIS Publishers	FEB 1, 2021	978 90 6369 603 0
Design Thinking Pedagogy	Cara Wrigley, Genevieve Mosely	Routledge	August 15, 2022	9781032279831
Research Handbook on Design Thinking	Edited by Karla Straker, Cara Wrigley	Edward Elgar Publishing	2023	978 1 80220 312 7

== Publications ==
In addition to the books listed, Wrigley has written or contributed to more than 170 refereed research papers and scholarly articles and has been cited more than 2800 times at the time of writing.

She is the editor-in-chief of the Journal of Design, Business and Society published bi-annually.

Articles, a selection:

- Wrigley, C., Straker, K. (2017): Design thinking pedagogy: The educational design ladder. In: Innovations in Education and Teaching International, Vol 54, Issue 4, pp. 374–385.
- Straker, K., Wrigley, C., Rosemann, M., (2015): Typologies and touchpoints: designing multi-channel digital strategies. In: Journal of Research in Interactive Marketing, Vol 9, Issue 2, pp. 110–128.
- Matthews, j., Wrigley, C., (2017): Design and design thinking in business and management higher education. In: Journal of Learning Design, Vol 10, Issue 4 pp. 41–54.
