= The Unicorn Chronicles =

Series young adult fantasy novels

- Into the Land of the Unicorns (1994); Song of the Wanderer (1999); Dark Whispers (2008); The Last Hunt (2010); Enter the Whisperer (2020)
- Author: Bruce Coville
- Country: United States
- Language: English
- Genre: Young adult fantasy novel

The Unicorn Chronicles is a series of young adult fantasy novels by Bruce Coville set in a fantasy world, Luster, that lies parallel to our own. Within this realm exist all sorts of fantastical and mythological beasts, from the familiar unicorn to the strange, squirrel-like creature known as the Squijum.

The series was originally published as four books between 1994 and 2010 but began republication in 2020 with changes. In order to make the books more uniform in size, the last two books will be split into five for a seven book series.

The first novel in the series was chosen as a finalist for the Young Adults' Choices for 1996 list, a project funded by the International Literacy Association. The second novel was chosen for the 2001 list.

== Plot ==
The story begins when Cara Hunter is sent to Luster via a magical amulet given to her by her grandmother, Ivy Morris. Cara is asked to tell the Queen of the Unicorns that "The Wanderer is weary." Her quest to find the Queen quickly becomes dangerous as Cara is caught up in a battle between the unicorns and the group of humans attempting to find and kill them. During her travels she befriends and is aided by the world's inhabitants, such as Lightfoot, a young unicorn prince, M'Gama, a Geomancer who draws magical power from the earth, and the Dimblethum, a bearlike creature, among many others. The more Cara explores Luster, the more she comes to question everything she thought she knew about her world back home.

== Novels ==
The first book, Into the Land of the Unicorns, introduces Cara as the main character. Ivy sends Cara into the parallel universe 'Luster', where she must find the unicorns' Queen, Arabella Skydancer, and give her a message sent by Ivy.

The second book, Song of the Wanderer, is about Cara's return to Earth to fetch her grandmother; however, while searching for Ivy, she encounters Beloved, a diabolical ancestress of hers, who is determined to enter Luster and destroy the unicorns.

The third book, Dark Whispers (the first portion republished as Enter the Whisperer), follows both Cara and her father as they embark on separate missions. SECRET OF THE DELVERS is the second portion of the old Book 3, DARK WHISPERS, that contains five new chapters. Cara is on the hunt to uncover a story removed from the Chronicles, one that has the potential to shed light on the enmity between the unicorns and the vicious race of creatures known as the delvers. Meanwhile, Ian Hunter, Cara's father, seeks a way into the Rainbow Prison in order to free the spirit of his lost wife Martha, in the red shaft.

The fourth and final installment in the Unicorn Chronicles series, The Last Hunt, opens on Luster's hour of need. Beloved's plans to destroy Luster are coming to fruition, and it will require Cara, her entire family, her dearest friends, and all of Luster's inhabitants, to put an end to centuries-long war between Beloved and her descendants once and for all.

There are also a few short stories set in the mystical world of the Unicorn Chronicles. One is told from the perspective of Cara's grandmother during her childhood in Coville's anthology, A Glory of Unicorns. Also available are The Boy With Silver Eyes, following the story of Nils, whose father was a Hunter and who forced Nils to do something terrible that changed his life thereafter, and Guardian of Memory, in which Grimwold, keeper of the Unicorn Chronicles, is summoned to tell an important tale as part of a ceremony that occurs once every 25 years. It is the story of Alma Leonetti, and her quest to discover why something sweet and precious has disappeared from old Earth.

== Characters ==
=== Into the Land of the Unicorns ===
- Cara Diana Hunter: The young female protagonist. A twelve-year-old redhead who is sent into Luster by her maternal grandmother's mystical amulet to tell the Queen of the Unicorns that "the Wanderer is weary."
- Ivy Morris: Maternal grandmother to Cara, called "the Wanderer" by those who know her in Luster, for her tendency to never stay in one place too long.
- Lightfoot: The very first unicorn that Cara meets after arriving in Luster; a young and somewhat wayward descendant of the unicorns' queen, Arabella Skydancer. The two become great friends along the span of Cara's travels.
- Beloved: Cara's paternal great-great-great-great-great-great grandmother, who is bent on destroying all unicorns and is therefore called "the Ravager" in their mythology. She is both centuries old and immortal as a result of the tip of the mystical horn of Whiteling lodged in her chest when she was young, which continually pierces her heart and, reacting to her pain, continuously heals the injury it causes instantly. She is the main antagonist of the stories.
- Ian Hunter: Cara's father, who initially serves Beloved in hunting the unicorns to extinction as one of her hunters. He eventually defects and leaves on a quest to find and release the spirit of his lost wife from prison of light.
- Queen Arabella Skydancer: Known as the Old One, to whom Cara conveys her maternal grandmother's last message, initiating the second book. She is revealed to be the grandmother of Ivy Morris herself, making her Cara's maternal great-great grandmother, and Martha's maternal great-grandmother.
- The Dimblethum: A partly manlike, partly bearlike creature that rescues Cara on her arrival in Luster. He later accompanies Cara on her quest in the second book. He is suggested to be the only one of his kind.
- The Squijum: A hyperactive "squirrel-like" animal that behaves like a lovable pet. He is twice identified as the only member of his species.
- Firethroat: The dragon controlled by Cara's father and later freed by Cara, to whom she gives the ability to understand and speak the language of the creatures of Luster as a boon.
- Thomas the Tinker: A traveling repairman and inventor who befriends Cara. He carries with him an array of pocket watches adapted to serve diverse ends.
- Grimwold: A dwarf who is Keeper of the Unicorn Chronicles. He writes down all the stories of Luster. He offers stories and help to the protagonists, and is faithful to both his task and his friends.
- Delvers: Ferocious, goblin-like creatures who serve as antagonists; they live mainly underground.

=== Song of the Wanderer ===
Most characters of the first book reappear in the subsequent books. Others are listed here:

- Ebillan: The youngest dragon in Luster, and the last to seek a home there. Like Firethroat, he keeps a vast hoard of treasures. His sweetheart is Lady Nakreema, who lives in a parallel universe distinct from both Luster and Earth. The resulting separation has made Ebillan foul-tempered.
- Moonheart: A gruff, detached unicorn. The Queen's relative and Lightfoot's uncle. He is the leader of the small group that assists in taking Cara back to Earth to retrieve the Wanderer. He is responsible for - and therefore often annoyed at - his nephew for being frivolous.
- Finder: One of the unicorns who accompany Cara to Earth; he is gentle, kind, and an experienced explorer.
- Medafil: A gryphon whom Cara rescues in the forest on her journey. He was promised a kiss by Ivy years before, and Cara kisses him to pay the debt. He gives Cara a shell that constantly sings the "Song of the Wanderer," composed by Ivy herself, and a spherical light that grows or shrinks on command. Medafil later accompanies Cara on her way to Ebillan's cave.
- Amalia Flickerfoot: The Queen's favorite granddaughter and the true identity of Ivy the Wanderer, whose form she assumed to escape Beloved's Hunters, and thus remained until the end of the second book. In her human form, she has no memory of her earlier identity, though all memories return to her upon its restoration.
- Belle: The third unicorn accompanying Cara to Earth. She specializes in fighting tactics, and is a romantic interest of Lightfoot's (and, as is revealed in the third book, Finder's).
- The Queen's Players: A traveling performance troupe, led by the acrobat Armando de la Quintano. He's considered frivolous by Belle and Moonheart, but is much valued by other characters, and instrumental in the final battle of the story.
- Jacques: One of the Queen's Players, and former husband to Ivy. Upon learning that Cara is Ivy's granddaughter, he joins Cara's party, believing Cara is his own granddaughter as well. Coville appears to imply some ambiguity of this claim, though no evidence has appeared to contradict it.
- M'Gama: A very powerful and gifted geomancer who gives Cara directions to Earth and a mystic emerald ring that reveals the location of Ivy's spirit. She appears capable of great feats of extrasensory perception and psychokinesis derived from sensitivity to Luster's geosphere. She refers at times to the "lines of power"; this is evidently a reference to ley lines. She ultimately places herself within Luster's Axis Mundi to prevent its collapse.
- Flensa: A female dwarf and M'Gama's beloved assistant.
- Bellenmore: The elderly and very powerful wizard who opened the world of Luster as a safe haven for the unicorns, dragons, and (as is revealed in the third book) many other mythical beings; dwarves, merpeople, centaurs.

=== Dark Whispers ===
The majority of characters reappear in the third book, and some new are introduced. All play a prominent part in the fourth.

- The Whisperer: A mysterious, nearly invisible force created when (according to the story's premise) the unicorns, in ancient times, magically drained themselves of potential evil. This potential evil became the Whisperer, a shadowy being that (as his name suggests) whispers to life-forms, persuading them to behave maliciously. The act of creating him also created the delvers from a strain of dwarfs.
- The Blind Man: An obese, reclusive individual living in New Delhi, said to have sacrificed his eyesight in order to gain knowledge of the Rainbow Prison. Ian Hunter seeks knowledge from him in the early chapters of the book. In exchange for this information, the Blind Man gains the ability to deprive Ian of his eyesight, which the Blind Man then uses as his own before returning it. He is later shown to have exiled his wife to the Rainbow Prison as punishment for deceiving or betraying him, and stated to have formed alliances with her thereafter. His motivations are ambiguous.
- (Madame) Alma Leonetti: The oldest human on Luster, who traveled there in search of the unicorns shortly after Bellenmore's removal of them, and ensured that a single unicorn (called the 'Guardian of Memory' in-universe) remains on Earth to fulfill the eponymous task. Like Thomas and Cara, she has received an unusual longevity, and therefore has lived for centuries. She appears in A Glory of Unicorns, Dark Whispers, and in the short story Guardian of Memory, where much of her own background story is revealed.
- Balan: Alma's loyal brother, who accompanies her in search of the unicorns. He remains on Earth even after she chose to leave.
- Fallon: A tall, extremely beautiful man who accompanies Ian Hunter in the search for the Rainbow Prison, desiring to enter it himself in search of a friend named Elihu, with whom he is said to have shared an intimacy superior to that of brothers. Fallon is portrayed as an unusual figure, capable of discerning lies when they are spoken to him; he is highly intelligent, thoughtful, and skilled. A mention of Elihu as one of those present at the ceremony that created the Whisperer suggests that he and Fallon are thousands of years old, despite Fallon's appearance of youth. Fallon himself reveals little to Ian of his own past until inside the Rainbow Prison, and even then does not mention his true age.
- Rajiv: The North Indian boy who, bribed by Ian Hunter, leads him to the home of the Blind Man. Rajiv later accompanies Ian and Fallon to and inside the Rainbow Prison. He is shown to be adventurous, prone to airsickness, cunning, friendly, helpful, and playful.
- Gnurflax: King of the delvers; capricious and prone to violent fury, and heavily influenced by the Whisperer.
- Rocky/Nedzik: A delver who questions King Gnurflax's policy of abetting the Hunters, Nedzik appears in the first book to warn Cara and her friends of a threat, and in the third book is eventually imprisoned for treason and deprived of his name (an archaic delver punishment of especial severity). Cara, later captive, encounters him in prison, and subsequently renames him "Rocky."
- Namza: King Gnurflax's advisor/shaman, Namza is a delver wizard skilled in various arts of magic. He is stated to have been Gnurflax's closest advisor before the arrival of the Whisperer. He attempts to the discover the Whisperer's identity, but is thwarted when the Whisperer imprisons him in his own magic spell, turning him into stone. In the fourth book, he is identified as Nedzik/Rocky's past mentor.
- The Chiron: The ruler of the centaurs of Luster, who dwell in a small valley in the northeast. His title and position are traditionally bestowed on the most skilled warrior of the tribe; however, the Chiron of the third book has been immortal for many centuries, having received a boon to this effect so that he may return to Earth, from whence his people came.
- Arianna: The Chiron's granddaughter, who befriends Cara and her company.
- Martha Morris Hunter: Cara's mother, daughter of Ivy and presumably of Jacques. Kept in stasis in the Rainbow Prison until the third book, wherein her dormancy is broken by Rajiv.
- Barnabas: One of the humans trapped in the Rainbow Prison, and the first of this category to meet Ian, Fallon, and Rajiv. It is he who reveals the location of Martha and the ability of teleportation known as "shimmering" by which anyone in the Rainbow Prison may move instantaneously from its current position to another whose appearance is known. He is suggested to be slightly delusional, although coherent.
- Felicity: The Blind Man's wife, who is stated to have been banished to the Rainbow Prison by her husband. They are said to be allies of convenience.
- Aaron: Bellenmore's apprentice, mentioned only by name. He is implied to have left his master on grounds of a quarrel, but is stated in other books by Coville to have been a wizard of equal potency.

=== The Last Hunt ===
- Allura: The younger sister of Fallon who also hails from the mystical realm of "Paradise" and a member of the Great Powers. She was in love with Elihu, her brother's "alahim", and had helped the ancient delver Netzram and his pupil Namza several centuries ago.
- Elihu: One of the members of the Great Powers, and the creator of all of Luster, who desired to make "a world of his own", regardless of the limitations his power-level had. He was/is Fallon's dearest friend and confidant (which is refereed as alahim) and was therefore severely punished when the creation of Luster was discovered.
- Gramag: The seventh and last dragon of Luster. She resides on Dark Mountain, where lightning constantly strikes. however, unlike the others, she was not born a dragon but rather a human girl by the name of May Margret of Orzaboro Castle in the Scottish Highlands. She was transformed into a dragon by her wicked stepmother via transformational magic but retains her some of her humanity and Scottish accent. She is the dragon Cara goes to, to request her aid in the imminent final battle between the Hunters.
- Martha Hunter (nee Morris): She is Ian's estranged wife and Cara's long-lost mother. She is a young woman with red shoulder-length hair and blue eyes. She is the only child of Ivy Morris (who is later revealed to be Amalia Flickerfoot, the long-lost Princess of the Unicorns and the true heir to the throne) and an unnamed human man. In her young adult years, she became the art teacher at an elementary school, where she had met and fell for the first grade teacher: Ian Hunter. within a year, she became his wife and then bore their only child, a daughter whom they named Cara. Her spirit was eventually separated from her physical self and imprisoned in the red shaft of the Rainbow Prison by Beloved. However, unlike the other prisoners, her soul was placed within a hallow tree and put in suspended animation for nearly a whole decade. In Song of the Wanderer she first appeared in a vision seen by Cara from a red jewel.

Near the end of Dark Whispers her spirit is finally found by her husband and his traveling companions Rajiv and Fallan. At Rajiv's touch, she awakened and was frightened at her extraordinary predicament. Fortunately, her spirit was released from the Prison and returned to body by Lightfoot's healing abilities.

== Luster ==
Luster, the Land of the Unicorns, is a parallel universe linked to Earth by seven portals, called Gates. According to the story's premise, the Gates are controlled by five amulets, known as the Queen's Five, made of gold, crystal, and unicorn hair. These amulets carry the bearer, upon utterance of necessary incantations, between worlds. Luster itself is said to have been created by the being called Elihu, against the will of those more divine than himself. At its center stands an immense tree, identified as its Axis Mundi, whose roots are believed to extend as far as does Luster itself. This Axis Mundi is damaged by Beloved's entry into Luster (thus placing the entire world in danger of collapse), and is later mended after the Hunters' defeat.

The unicorns' sociopolitical court meets at four distinct places located on the four corners of a continent. Each is inhabited during a particular season of the year; the four are called Springdale, Summerhaven, Autumngrove, and Winterkeep.

Like Earth, Luster has constellations. The Ravager, the Queen, the Guardian, and the Snake are the only ones mentioned. The Ravager constellation is connected to Beloved, who uses it as a means of influencing Cara.

Seven dragons live in Luster: Firethroat, Graumag, Fah-Leing, Redrage, Ebillan, Master Bloodtongue, and Bronzeclaw. These were the last seven dragons on Earth, who fled to Luster when (according to the story's premise) they were unable to remain. Other members of their race live in yet another parallel universe, possibly the same universe glimpsed in Coville's novel Jeremy Thatcher, Dragon Hatcher, by the presence in both storylines of the wizard Bellenmore and his apprentice Aaron.

Between Luster and Earth, and presumably between other worlds, lies a realm of light in all the colors of the visible spectrum. Because this realm is sometimes used as a place of exiles, it is called the Rainbow Prison. It is accessible by means of certain jewels corresponding in color to individual 'shafts' of the Prison.
