= Karras =

Karras or Karas (Greek: Καρράς) is a Greek surname. The female form of the surname is Karra or Kara. It may refer, among others, to one of the following people:

- Alex Karras (1935–2012), Greek-American football player, professional wrestler, and actor
- George Karras (c.1929–2017), American football coach
- Ioannis Karras, Greek football personality
- Johnny Karras (1928–2008), American football player
- Kostas Karras (1936–2012), Greek actor and politician
- Lou Karras (1927–2018), American football player
- Nolan Karras (born 1944), American politician
- Ruth Karras (born 1957), medieval historian
- Ted Karras Sr. (1934–2016), American football player
- Ted Karras Jr. (born 1964), American football player and coach
- Ted Karras III (born 1993), American football player
- Vasilis Karras (1953–2023), Greek singer

== Fictional ==
- Father Karras, fictional Greek-American character from the novel The Exorcist
- Father Karras, the fictional antagonist of the game Thief 2: The Metal Age
