= Beth Steel =

English playwright

Beth Steel is an English playwright originally from Shirebrook near Mansfield, in the East Midlands. She is best known for her work in theatre, including the Olivier Award-nominated play Till the Stars Come Down.

== Early life ==
Steel is from a working-class background, raised by a miner father and part-time shop assistant mother. After completing her GCSEs, she left school aged 16 and moved to Greece, where she worked as a model and sold clothes. She then returned to London, where she became a waitress and began reading plays.

== Plays ==
Steel's first play Ditch was produced as part of HighTide festival 2010 and performed at the Old Vic Tunnels

Wonderland premiered in 2014 at the Hampstead Theatre directed by Edward Hall.

Labyrinth premiered at the Hampstead Theatre in 2016, directed by Anna Ledwich.

The House of Shades premiered at the Almeida in 2022 starring Anne-Marie Duff, and directed by Blanche McIntyre.

Steel was writer-in-residence at the National Theatre, where she wrote Till the Stars Come Down. It premiered at the National Theatre's Dorfman Theatre in 2024 before transferring to the West End in 2025. The play has been translated and performed around the world including the Parco Theatre, Tokyo.

== Awards and nominations ==
For Wonderland, Steel was nominated for the 2014 Susan Smith Blackburn Prize and won the Evening Standard Award for Most Promising Playwright.

For The House of Shades, she was nominated for the 2021 Susan Smith Blackburn Prize

In 2024, Till the Stars Come Down received an Olivier Award nomination for Best New Play. Lorraine Ashbourne also received a nomination for Best Actress in a Supporting Role.
