= El Imposible National Park =

National park in El Salvador

- IUCN category II (national park)
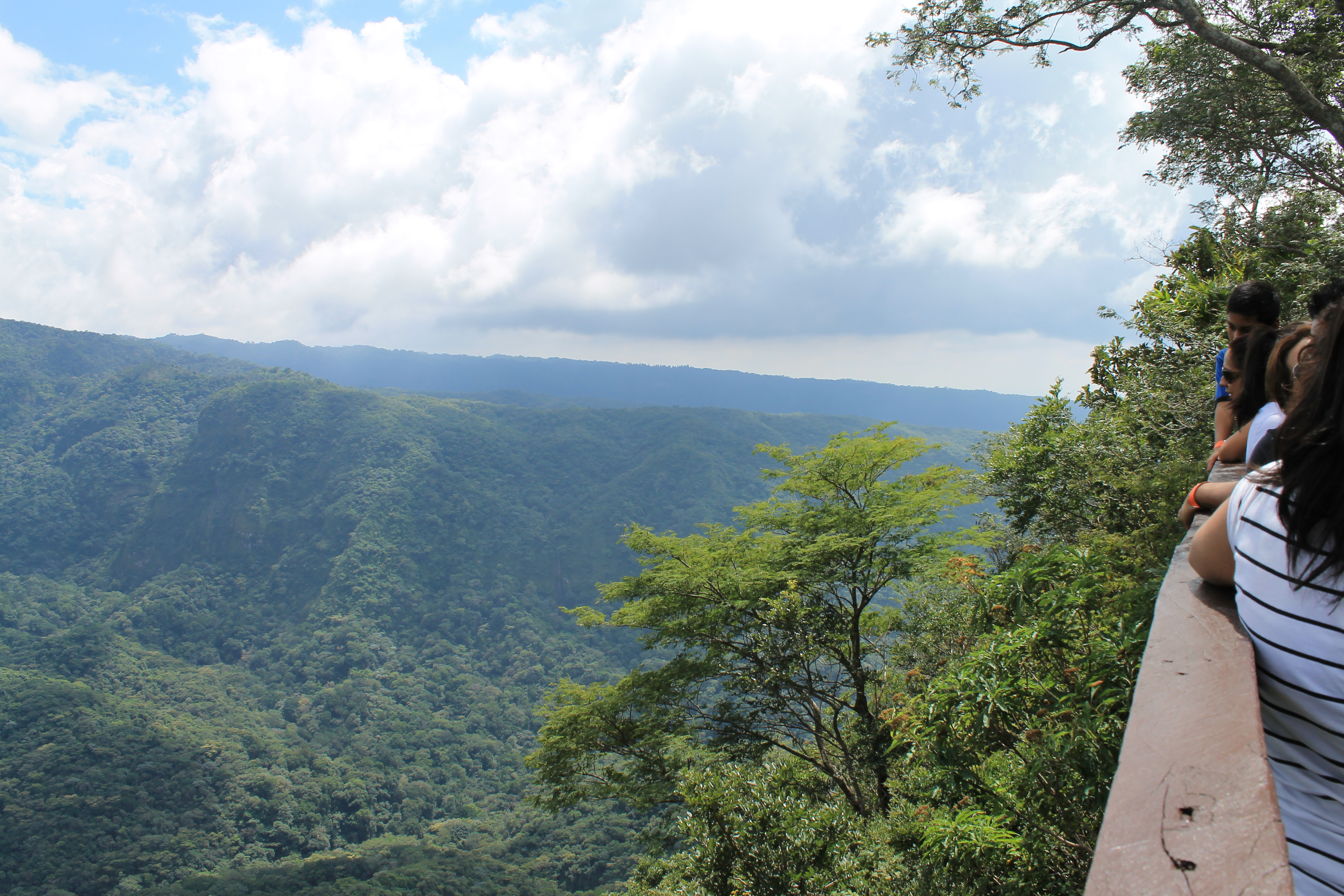
- Lookout in the national park

- Location within El Salvador
- Location: Ahuachapán Department, El Salvador
- Coordinates: 13°50′30″N 89°57′27″W
- Area: 38.20 km^{2} (14.75 sq mi)
- Established: 1 January 1989

El Imposible National Park (Spanish: Parque Nacional El Imposible) is a tropical forest and protected area in western El Salvador. Established on January 1, 1989, it covers 38.20 km² within the Apaneca llamatepec mountain range, with elevations ranging from 250 to 1,425 m (820 to 4,675 ft) above sea level. Its name, meaning "The Impossible National Park", refers to a perilous gorge that has historically claimed the lives of farmers and pack mules transporting coffee to the Pacific coast. The park encompasses eight rivers that contribute to the watershed of Barra de Santiago and the coastal mangrove forests.

The park supports a diverse range of wildlife, including pumas, oncillas, wild boars, king hawks and black-crested eagles. The Pacific Ocean is visible from elevated points within the forest.

In 1992, El Imposible National Park was included on UNESCO's World Heritage Tentative List alongside the archeological site of Cara Sucia.
