= Kara Stone =

Canadian video game designer, artist, and academic

- Born: 1989 (age 36–37); Toronto, Ontario, Canada
- Occupations: Video game designer, artist, scholar

Kara Stone (born 1989) is a Canadian video game designer, artist, and academic.

Stone has produced a number of independent games, including Medication Mediation, Sext Adventure, and Ritual of the Moon. Her work largely focuses on the intersection of game design with disability and gender. She is a member of the Different Games collective.

== Early life ==
Stone was born and raised in Toronto, Canada. She is a graduate of Etobicoke School of the Arts and holds a Bachelor of Fine Arts in film production and a Master of Arts in communication and culture from York University. She has a PhD in film & digital media from the University of California, Santa Cruz and is an assistant professor at the Alberta University of the Arts.

== Career ==
Stone's early art was not in the medium of video games. Her 2012 work Polaroid Panic consists of Polaroid photos Stone captured of her face whenever she experienced a panic attack. Two years later, she released her video game Medication Meditation, published in collaboration with Dames Making Games. Medication Meditation consists of an "unwinnable compilation of activities," each of which reflects an experience associated with living with mental illness. The game was well-received, and saw favorable coverage in outlets such as Kill Screen and The Atlantic.

That same year, Stone released one of her most popular games, Sext Adventure, written by Stone and developed by Nadine Lessio. In Sext Adventure, the player has a sexual encounter with a fictional robot via text message (later expanded to web browsers) that challenges traditional notions of what sexting looks like. While the game begins like a normal sexting conversation (including real nudity) eventually the robot becomes confused and begins to produce errors, including mistaking its own presumed gender and the gender of the player. The game has twenty different possible endings.

Stone released Ritual of the Moon in 2019. Over the course of 28 real-time days, Ritual of the Moon unveils the narrative of a witch who has been exiled to the Moon. The art style of the game is composed entirely of scanned and digitally manipulated images. Many reviews of the game focused on the unique structure of the game, including a full 28-day series on Rock Paper Shotgun.

Stone's work UnearthU was released in 2021. Starting as a seemingly straightforward wellness app, UnearthU gradually reveals a narrative that interrogates and critiques mindfulness, wellness, and the Silicon Valley technology industry.

== Ludography ==
=== Video games ===
Year	Title
2014	Medication Meditation
2014	Sext Adventure
2014	Techo Tarot
2015	Cyclothymia
2018	the earth is a better person than me
2019	Ritual of the Moon
2021	UnearthU

== Selected publications ==
- Stone, Kara. “Time and Reparative Game Design: Queerness, Disability, and Affect”. Game Studies: The International Journal of Computer Game Research, 18(3). December 2018. ISSN 1604-7982.
- Stone, Kara. “What Can Play: The Potential of Non-Human Players”. Pivot: A Journal of Interdisciplinary Study and Thought, 7(9). 2 April 2019. doi:10.25071/2369-7326.40291.
