= Et'hem Cara =

Albanian politician

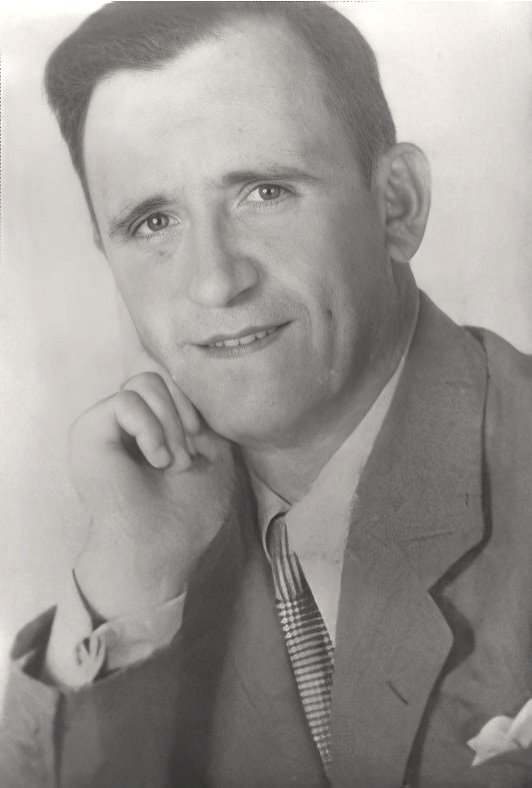
- Et'hem Cara

Minister of Finance
- In office 6 September 1944 – 25 October 1944
- Prime Minister: Ibrahim Biçakçiu
- Preceded by: Rrok Gera
- Succeeded by: Ramadan Çitaku

Personal details
- Born: 4 May 1905 Kavajë, Albania
- Died: 30 July 1973 (aged 68)

Et'hem Cara (4 May 1905–30 July 1973) served as Albania's Finance Minister in 1944.

== Early life ==
Orphaned at an early age, he was taken under the supervision of Qazim Bey Hydi who took care of his upbringing and education. Cara would later go on to study in Austria, where in 1928 he graduated from the Trading Academy in Linz. After completing his studies, Et'hem returned home where for two years he worked as a teacher. In 1930 he was employed at the Chamber of Commerce in Elbasan.

== Political career ==
From 1935 to 1944, Cara worked at the Ministry of Education, first as head inspector and later as director of personnel. Later that year, he would be appointed Finance Minister under the government of Ibrahim Biçaku, whom he had been acquainted with back in Austria.

As Minister of Finance, he clashed several times with the Nazi authorities who controlled Albania at the time. When the latter asked for a 12,000,000 Albanian francs loan from the National Bank, Et'hem categorically refused.
