= Bend It Like Beckham: The Musical =

2015 British musical play

Bend It Like Beckham
- the Musical
- 2015 West End production poster
- Music: Howard Goodall
- Lyrics: Charles Hart
- Book: Gurinder Chadha; Paul Mayeda Berges
- Basis: Bend It Like Beckham by Gurinder Chadha
- Premiere: 24 June 2015: Phoenix Theatre, London
- Productions: 2015 West End
- Awards: Critics' Circle Theatre Award for Best Musical

Bend It Like Beckham the Musical is a musical with music by Howard Goodall, lyrics by Charles Hart, and a book by Gurinder Chadha and Paul Mayeda Berges. Based on the 2002 film of the same name, the musical made its West End and world premiere at the Phoenix Theatre in May 2015.

== Background ==
The musical is based on the 2002 film Bend It Like Beckham. In late 2003, it was first revealed that the film's writer and director Gurinder Chadha planned to turn the film into a stage musical with the hope that it could be staged a year later. It was not until 2011, that further information emerged that a script had been completed and that they were looking for someone to compose the score, with workshops ultimately taking place in 2013 and early 2014.

On 31 October 2014, the show was officially confirmed and it was announced that the show would premiere in London in May 2015, with tickets going on sale on 7 November 2014. The musical has a book by Gurinder Chadha and her husband Paul Mayeda Berges and is directed by writer Gurinder Chadha, with choreography by Aletta Collins, set design by Miriam Buether, costume design by Katrina Lindsay and lighting design by Neil Austin. The musical's score is composed by Howard Goodall, with lyrics by Charles Hart, orchestrations by Charles Hart and Kuljit Bhamra, sound design by Richard Brooker and musical direction by Nigel Lilley.

== Production history ==
The show's premiere production began previews at the Phoenix Theatre in London, on 15 May 2015, with its official opening night coming on 24 June, initially booking until 11 July 2015. Prior to opening the booking period was extended to 24 October 2015. On 19 January 2015, full casting was announced with the news that Natalie Dew would play the role of Jess, with Lauren Samuels playing Jules, Jamie Campbell Bower as Joe, Ronni Ancona as Paula and Preeya Kalidas, who had previously played the role of Monica in the film, as Pinky. On 13 March 2015, it was revealed that Ronni Ancona had withdrawn from the production during rehearsals due to family reasons and that Sophie-Louise Dann would replace her in the role of Paula. The show also included four female footballers who would perform alongside the cast to help bring the game to the stage. The show closed on 5 March 2016, after a run of just 9 months at the end of the original cast's contracts.

On 7 May 2019 it was announced that the production, which debuted in London's West End in 2015, would have its North American premiere in Toronto, with a limited run at the St. Lawrence Centre for the Arts' Bluma Appel Theatre between 7 and 24 Dec.

== Music ==
=== Musical numbers ===
Act I

- "Glorious/Satnaam Siri"
- "UB2"
- "Girl Perfect"
- "Look At Us Now/Get Me"
- "Tough Love"
- "First Touch"
- "People Like Us"
- "Just A Game/Fly"

Act II

- "Glorious"
- "Result!"
- "More Fool Me"
- "There She Goes"
- "Bend It"
- "Mehndi/Heer"
- "Sadaa Charhdi Kalaa"
- "People Like Us (Reprise)/Glorious (Reprise)"
- "Fly (Reprise)/Girl Perfect (Reprise)/Bend it (Reprise)"

=== Orchestra ===
The musical uses an eight-member orchestra consisting of piano, guitar, mandolin, violin, cello, sitar, double bass, electric bass, tabla, dhokah, dhol and percussion.

== Principal roles and casts ==
Role	Original West End production
Jess	Natalie Dew
Jules	Lauren Samuels
Joe	Jamie Campbell Bower
Paula	Sophie-Louise Dann
Pinky	Preeya Kalidas
Tony	Jamal Andréas
Mr Bhamra	Tony Jayawardena
Mrs Bhamra	Natasha Jayetileke
Teetu	Raj Bajaj
Teetu's Dad	Irvine Iqbal
Teetu's Mum	Sohm Kapila
Voiceover	John Motson
Ensemble	Michelle Bishop, Daniel Bolton, Rakesh Boury, Lisa Bridge, Chloe Chambers, Jorell Coiffic-Kamall, Buckso Dhillon-Woolley, Sejal Keshwala, Genesis Lynea, Harveen Mann, Serena Mathew, Tom Millen, Sharan Phull, Karl Seth, Kirstie Skivington and Danielle Young
Pro Footballers	Amy Bradley, Wendy Martin, Shannon Maloney and Robyn McEvoy
Heritage Singers	Shahid Khan and Rekha Sawhney
Swings	Kayleigh McKnight and Leanne Pinder

== Awards and nominations ==
=== Original West End production ===
Year	Award	Category	Nominee	Result
2015	Critics’ Circle Theatre Award	Best Musical		Won
2015	Evening Standard Theatre Award	Best Musical		Nominated
2015	Evening Standard Theatre Award	Newcomer in a Musical	Natalie Dew	Nominated
2016	Laurence Olivier Award	Best New Musical		Nominated
2016	Laurence Olivier Award	Best Actress in a Musical	Natalie Dew	Nominated
2016	Laurence Olivier Award	Best Actress in a Supporting Role in a Musical	Preeya Kalidas	Nominated
2016	Laurence Olivier Award	Outstanding Achievement in Music	Howard Goodall, Charles Hart and Kuljit Bhamra	Nominated
2016	Laurence Olivier Award	Best Costume Design	Katrina Lindsay	Nominated
