= Compassion and Responsibility for Animals =

Organization in the Philippines

- Founded: 2000; 26 years ago
- Purpose: Animal rights, Animal Welfare
- Location: 175 Lopez-Rizal corner Samat, Mandaluyong, Metro Manila
- Website: CARA official website

Compassion and Responsibility for Animals (CARA) is a registered non-profit, non-government animal welfare organization in the Philippines. It was founded in 2000 by a group of animal lovers determined to help the plight of animals in the Philippines. The current president of CARA is Nancy Cu-Unjieng.

== Objectives ==
CARA's core objectives can be summed up with the acronym "ABC and E": Animal Birth Control and Education. The organization focuses on reducing the number of homeless animals, stopping animal cruelty, promoting spaying and neutering, and encouraging responsible pet ownership.

== Activities ==
=== Spaying/neutering ===
CARA aims to control the number of stray cats in the streets of Manila by promoting spaying and neutering, which controls the animal population and decreases the number of stray animals found on the streets. In 2007, CARA established the first low-cost spay and neuter clinic in the Philippines. This clinic was located at Malate in Metro Manila.

=== Trap/neuter/return (TNR) ===
Trap/Neuter/Return, commonly referred to as “TNR,” is the only method proven to be humane and effective at controlling the feral cat population. Using this technique, all the feral cats in a colony are trapped, neutered, and then returned to their territory. The group's TNR program has received support from Bonifacio Global City in Taguig and is currently in place in Dasmariñas Village, Forbes Park, Makati, Bel-Air Village, Makati, San Lorenzo Village, Fort Bonifacio Development, and Polo Club Makati.

=== Animal education presentation ===
CARA has spoken at various schools, such as the International Beacon School in Taguig, on animal welfare and responsible pet ownership. It has also held programs during events such as World Animal Day, providing lectures, free rabies vaccines, check-ups, and supplies to pet owners. Among its achievements are signing a memorandum with the Makati City dog pound for a better managed facility.

=== Animal relief work ===
Adoption is another core campaign of CARA. The animals in the program consist of strays, rescues, or owner surrenders. CARA is not a shelter and does not have its own facility for housing animals. All of the animals are fostered in the homes of members and volunteers. CARA's first adoption event was held at Bonifacio High Street in Taguig in February 2009. The event was so successful that two more adoption events followed later that month. A total of 22 cats and 3 dogs were adopted, though one dog was later returned to the organization.

The group often works with other animal welfare organizations, such as the Animal Welfare Coalition (AWC), in protests and campaigns. It has joined protests against dog fighting, the electrocution of dogs in local pounds, the poor conditions of the Manila Zoo, the giving away of live rabbits and chicks by establishments during Easter, and illegal dog meat trade.

Other programs include the Faith Fund, Sponsor a Spay or Neuter, and Sponsor a Pet. The Faith Fund was named after a rescued cat and supports the medical expenses of CARA's sick or handicapped rescued animals. Many of them are successfully rehabilitated and are adopted into loving homes. "Sponsor a Cat" allows people who cannot adopt but who wish to help by enabling them to pay for the food, medicine, and other expenses of one of CARA's rescued cats until the cat is adopted. Sponsors receive a certificate and updates on their chosen animal. "Sponsor a Spay or Neuter" lets people make a one-time donation towards a spay or neuter, either of a rescued animal or one involved in a TNR program, at the CARA clinic. To raise funds, CARA throws Wildlife Parties for children, where exotic reptiles and insects are showcased by trained handlers. CARA also recently held its first garage sale in Bel Air Village, which was a huge success.

== Press ==
CARA has been featured in various media for their work.

They have appeared on the front page of the Philippine Daily Inquirer as a feature for World Animal Day in October 2006. The adoption event in Bonifacio High Street received considerable coverage, including by Reuters and Yahoo! News. In 2006, CARA participated in the "Dog Walk for a Cause" to protest the illegal dog meat trade and were noted for being the only group that proudly paraded mixed-breed dogs. Local mixed-breed dogs (commonly called "askals" in the Philippines) are not popular choices for Filipino pet owners, as most prefer purebreds.

The group also has a special page in every issue of Animal Scene magazine.

CARA also made the news when a number of their rescued cats became victims of animal abuse by a supposed third party. Despite being caged and kept in a secure area in a private subdivision, the cats and kittens were shot point-blank in the head. Many died or had to be euthanized; only 15 of the 29 animals survived. The event drew outrage and sparked an investigation, but the perpetrators were never found.

On June 15, 2013, Hannah Sanchez, a former member of the De La Salle University Green Tankers varsity team, helped CARA raise funds for its Pet Foster Care program in the Ultraswim for CARA event. Hannah promised to swim 900 laps in the 25-meter-long pool and donors, in turn, can donate a fixed amount or pledge a peso per lap. Proceeds from the Ultraswim went to three CARA initiatives: food for the 164 pit bulls rescued in the Laguna province, medical fund to cover the veterinary bills for rescued cats and dogs, and a charity fund to help low-income families spay and neuter their cats and dogs.
