= Kara Nova =

American pole acrobat

Kara Nova is an American contortionist and formerly a pole acrobat.

== Early work ==
Kara Nova featured in Hubba Hubba Revue poster, 2011 with burlesque captions

In 2011, she performed regularly as a pole acrobat in venues along the West Coast with burlesque troupe Hubba Hubba Revue, and with avant-garde cabaret circus troupe The Vau de Vire Society. In July 2011, Kara Nova featured in the Hubba Hubba Revue's poster as pole acrobat/witch being burnt at the stake, with the burlesque captions "Old Time Religion" and "Plate 15. Kara Nova. Foxy's Book of Martyrs" - a play on Foxe's Book of Martyrs.

Kara Nova was described by reviewers in 2011 as an exceptionally strong acrobat and an impressive performer. Der Spiegel commented (in German) '"Strip Clubs? Topless bars? Cheap Callgirls? Forget it. Pole Dance has long been a trend sport, and Kara Nova is one of the best dancers in the United States. The 22-year-old is all muscle, and performs feats which are frivolous, lascivious - but never vulgar." SF Weekly wrote "Kara Nova's 'Burned at the Cross' pole dance routine is a must see."

== Later work ==
In 2015, Kara Nova appeared in the documentary film A Solitary Mann directed by Loic Zimmermann; the film won in the "best documentary feature" category at the Los Angeles International Underground Film Festival 2015. In 2019 and 2022, her contortion act was on the bill of the Super Nova Circus & Variety Show at the Nevada Theatre in Nevada City, California.
