= Handanović =

Handanović (In Slovene also Handanovič) is a Bosnian Muslim surname, traditionally found in northwestern Bosnia and Herzegovina. A 1925 ethnographic study recorded 9 houses of a Handanović family in the village of Vikići. A 1930 ethnographic study recorded the mahala (hamlet) of Handanovići and 5 houses of a Handanović family in the village of Hrustovo, Sanski Most, a family which originated from Lika (tradition holds that most Hrustovo Muslim families fled Lika after Stojan Janković expelled them). It may refer to:

- Damir Handanović (born 1987), Serbian composer
- Jasmin Handanović (born 1978), Slovenian footballer
- Samir Handanović (born 1984), Slovenian footballer
- Rasema Handanović, Bosnian victim of wartime rape and war criminal
- Reuf Handanović, Yugoslav communist
