= Cara Horgan =

British actress (born 1984)

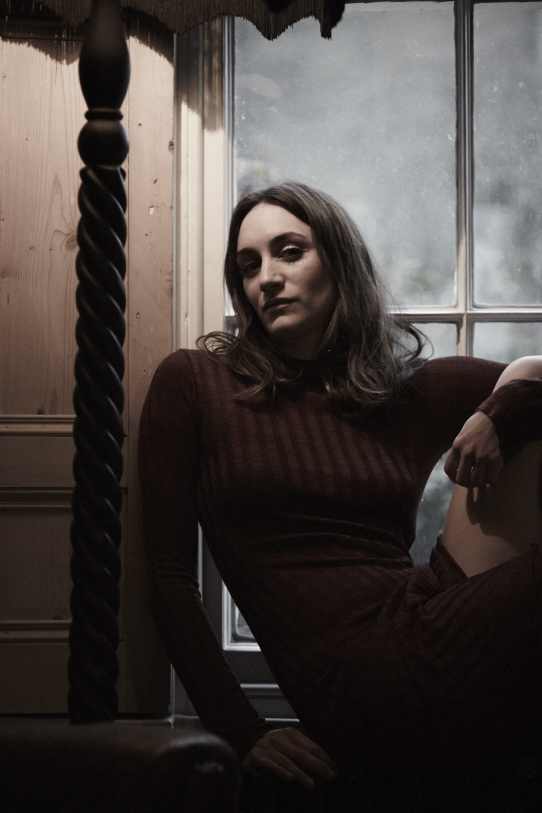
- Horgan in 2015
- Born: 5 October 1984 (age 41)
- Occupation: Actress
- Years active: 2004–present

Cara Horgan (born 5 October 1984) is a British actress who has appeared on stage, on television, and in films.

== Career ==
Horgan has appeared in several television productions including Peep Show, Traitors, The Rotters' Club, Genius: Picasso and Jane Eyre.

She has appeared in films including The Boy in the Striped Pyjamas, The Wedding Video, Armando Iannucci's The Death of Stalin, and Disobedience alongside Rachel McAdams and Rachel Weisz.

She appeared in music videos for Years & Years' single "Desire" and the Chemical Brothers' song "I'll See You There".

In 2008, Horgan appeared in Hedda, a modern updated version of Hedda Gabler, directed by Carrie Cracknell in which she played the lead character to favourable reviews; reviewer Charles Spencer in The Daily Telegraph wrote that she was "especially fine as a glamorous, bob-haired Hedda, ... using sex... like a shrimping net".

In 2009, she appeared in a revival of Ferdinand Bruckner's Krankheit der Jugend ("Pains of Youth"), directed by Katie Mitchell, at the National Theatre. In 2010, she appeared in Caryl Churchill's Far Away at Bristol Old Vic, directed by Simon Godwin.

In 2011, she performed in The School for Scandal directed by Deborah Warner and written by Richard Brinsley Sheridan.

From 2013 to 2015, she joined Sean Holmes' ten-member Secret Theatre company at the Lyric Hammersmith, which experimented with improvisational techniques towards drama. For some performances, a cast member's name was chosen from a hat by an audience member to be the show's protagonist; then, he or she would be "given a series of increasingly impossible acts to accomplish" which could involve such activities as complex dance routines, wrestling, singing and improvisation, according to one account. She performed with the ensemble for two years to positive reviews. In an extended interview in Exeunt Magazine, she described her work at Secret Theatre as giving her "freedom to play".

In 2015, she appeared in The Mother at the Ustinov Studio in Bath. In 2017, she appeared in Cellmates at the Hampstead Theatre directed by Edward Hall. Paul Taylor in The Independent wrote: "Cara Horgan is delectable in a double as the Russian maid who duets with Bourke in his hammy renditions of 'Danny Boy' for his captors and as the wife in a CND couple who have an inconvenient marital meltdown while helping Blake on his first night outside."

== Filmography ==
=== Film ===
Year	Title	Role	Notes
2004	The Libertine	Acting Troop	
2008	The Boy in the Striped Pyjamas	Maria	
2009	Canacucho	Mrs. Richardson	
2009	Be Good	Joanna	Short film
2010	Cowards & Monsters	Fun_Girl73	Short film
2011	Where There's Smoke	Kate	Short film
2012	The Wedding Video	Roxy	
2013	Fish Love	Ali	Short film
2014	Steak Knife	Sara	Short film
2017	The Death of Stalin	Lidiya Timashuk	
2017	Disobedience	Miss Scheinburg	
2017	V.O.	Amanda	Short film
2018	The Mechanicals of Hemp	Petra	Short film
2019	Boat	Clara	Short film
2019	Lessons of the Hour	Ottilie Assing	

=== Television ===
Year	Title	Role	Production	Notes
2005	The Rotters' Club	Claire Newman	Company Pictures	Mini-series; 3 episodes
2005	Afterlife	Veronica Vass	Clerkenwell Films / ITV	Episode: "More Than Meets the Eye"
2006	The Romantics	Mary Shelley	BBC	Mini-series; episode: "Nature"
2006	Jane Eyre	Eliza Reed	BBC	Mini-series; episode 3
2007	Fallen Angel	Joanna	IWC Media / Ingenious Broadcasting	Mini-series; episode: "The Judgement of Strangers"
2007	Peep Show	Aurora	Objective Productions	Episode: "Holiday"
2007	Silent Witness	Anna Holland	BBC	Episode: "Double Dare"
2008	Ladies and Gentlemen	Emily	Talkback Thames	Television film
2009	Lewis	Alice Wishart	ITV Studios	Episode: "Allegory of Love"
2011	Waking the Dead	Young Lucy Christie	BBC	Episode: "Solidarity"
2011	Law & Order: UK	Elizabeth Lerner	Kudos Film and Television	Episode: "Intent"
2012	A Young Doctor's Notebook	Klara	Big Talk Productions	Episode: "Episode Three"
2013	Jo	Maria	Atlantique Productions	Episode: "Notre Dame"
2013	Common Ground	Suzi	Baby Cow Productions	Episode: "Eleanor"
2016	Midsomer Murders	Rachel Monkford	Bentley Productions	Episode: "A Dying Art"
2018	Genius	Alice B. Toklas	National Geographic	Episode: "Picasso: Chapter Seven"
2018	West of Liberty	Jeanie J. Johnson	Anagram	6 episodes
2019	Traitors	Rae Savitt	42 / Twenty Twentry Television	4 episodes
2019	Flack	Camilla	CASM Films / Hat Trick Productions	Episode: "Duncan"
2021	Alex Rider	Polly Hunton	Eleventh Hour Films	Episode: "Mirror"
2021	Murder in Provence	Elodie Liotta	Monumental Television / ITV Studios	Episode: #1.3
2021	The Sandman	Zelda	DC Comics / DC Entertainment	3 episodes
2023	Black Cake	Mildred	Harpo Films / Hulu Originals	Episode: "Eleanor"
2024	Grantchester	Leah Carpenter	Lovely Day / Kudos	Episode: #9.4
2023–present	The Marlow Murder Club	Becks Starling	Monumental Television / PBS / UKTV	Series 1–3; 16 episodes

=== Theatre ===
Year	Title	Role	Director	Venue
2008	Hedda	Hedda	Carrie Cracknell	The Gate Theatre
2009	The House of Special Purpose	Olga	Howard Davies	Chichester Festival Theatre
2009	Pains of Youth	Irena	Katie Mitchell	The National Theatre
2010	Far Away	Joan	Simon Godwin	Bristol Old Vic
2011	The School for Scandal	Maria	Deborah Warner	The Barbican
2013–2015	Secret Theatre – Woyzeck – A Streetcar Named Desire – Chamber Piece – Glitterland – A Series of Increasingly Impossible Acts – Show 6 – A Stab in the Dark	Various	Sean Holmes	The Lyric, Hammersmith
2015	The Mother	Elodie	Laurence Boswell	Bath Ustinov
2017	Cellmates	Miranda / Zinaida	Edward Hall	The Hampstead Theatre
