= Handan Kara =

Turkish singer (1939–2017)

- Born: 1 June 1939; Bakırköy, Istanbul, Turkey
- Died: 14 April 2017 (aged 77)
- Occupation: Singer
- Children: 3
- Musical career
- Genres: Classical Turkish Music
- Years active: 1962–1986
- Labels: Yeşilçam

Handan Kara (1 June 1939 – 14 April 2017) was a Turkish classical music singer. She had a prolific career as a Turkish Classical singer, releasing several albums and starring as the voice in several popular Turkish mid-century films.

== Early life ==
She was born in 1939 in the Bakırköy district of Istanbul. After completing her primary and secondary education, she started a career as a civil servant. In 1961, she began taking singing lessons from various voice coaches during her spare time upon the encouragement of her mother and Udi Şevket Tümer, a family friend. While working full time as a civil servant, she began to work as a signer at night. In 1965, as her confidence and experience as a singer grew, she took exams offered by TRT Istanbul Radio in 1965 and was offered an audition whereupon her career as a radio artist began.

== Career ==
She first appeared on the stage in 1965 at TRT Radio in Istanbul. As her career grew, she voiced songs for many Yeşilçam films under the guidance of composer Yıldırım Gürses, especially for actress Türkan Şoray. As her career grew, she performed concerts in cities in Europe and Turkey. She reaching the pinnacle of her career with the work "Last Spring Winds" which played in a number of popular films. She also released a record titled "Cannot Love Kara Gözlüm". She began to collaborate with composer Suat Sayın on the sons "The Endless Ordeal" and "Let Your Ears Ring". She took part as an actor in films such as "Give My Allah Give Me" and "Here Camel Here Hendek" between 1971 and 1972.

In 1974, she got married and moved to Hamburg, Germany due to her husband finding work there. There she founded and directed the Hamburg Turkish Music Choir. She settled into a more domestic life in Germany and continued her work in the arts as a choir conductor.

== Personal life ==
Handan Kara was married in 1974 and became the mother of three children while living in Germany. She returned to Turkey in later life and died on 14 April 2017 at the age of 78 in Istanbul. She was buried in Ortaköy Cemetery in Ortaköy, Istanbul.

== Awards ==
In 2011, she was given an achievement award together with Deniz Türkali at the Flying Broom International Women's Film Festival.

== Discography ==
=== Albums ===
Year	Title	Role	Notes
1967	İyi Gün Dostu, Nadide	Voice	Released by Melodi Plak
1968	Sarmaşık Gülleri / Sabır Taşı Çatladı	Voice	Released by Şanlıel
1968	Meskenim Meyhaneler Oldu/Yalan Dünyada Kimseye Güven Olmaz	Voice	Released by Şanlıel
1968	Aşk İle Yandırdın Kalbim/Sevgilim Bir Tanem Herşeyimdi	Voice	Released by Melodi
1971	Sonbahar Rüzgarları	Voice	Produced by Fonex and regarded as her greatest song
1971	Halep Yolu/Ey Kader Yolcusu	Voice	Produced by Fonex
1971	Sevemedim Karagözlüm/Gözüm Sende	Voice	Produced by Fonex
1972	Sevemedim Karagözlüm/Gözüm Sende	Voice	Produced by Fonex
1972	Sen Bir Yana Dünya Bir Yana	Voice	Produced by Fon 536
1972	Oyun Bitti/Kulakların Çınlasın	Voice	Produced by Fon 531
1973	Tesadüf/Siyah Saçlar	Voice	Produced by Şah Plak
1973	Kader Bağladı Bizi/Gidipde Dönmemek Var	Voice	Produced by Fonex
1974	Kaybolan Baharım/İsyan	Voice	Produced by Fonex

=== Singles ===
Year	Title	Role	Notes
1986	Ben Milyoner Değilim	Voice	Credited as Handan Kara
1972	Ver Allahım Ver	Voice	
1971	İşte Deve İşte Hendek	Voice	

=== Film ===
Year	Title	Role	Notes
1986	Ben Milyoner Değilim	Voice	Credited as Handan Kara
1972	Ver Allahım Ver	Voice	
1971	İşte Deve İşte Hendek	Voice	
