= Cara Sucia (Mesoamerican site) =

Ancient Cotzumalhuapa archaeological site in El Salvador

Coordinates: 13°46.612′N 90°02.715′W

Location of Cara Sucia in El Salvador

Cara Sucia is a Mesoamerican archaeological site on the Pacific coastal plain of western El Salvador. It was occupied for some 1,800 years, and is particularly noted as one of the southeasternmost sites of the Late Classic Cotzumalhuapa culture which extended over much of the Pacific drainage of Guatemala and included part of the Salvadoran departments of Ahuachapán and Sonsonate.

== Archaeology ==
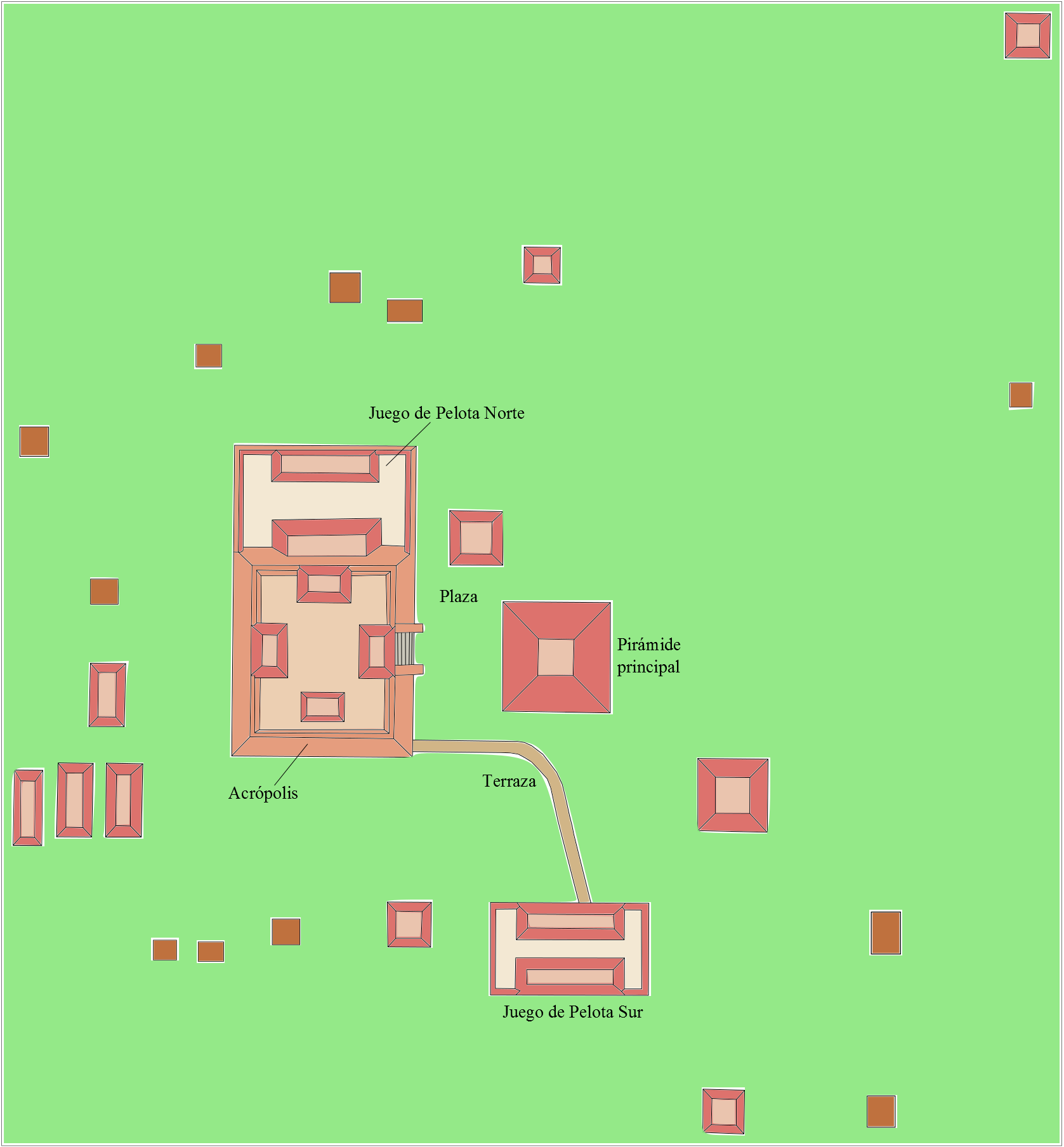
Structures of Cara Sucia

Cara Sucia was settled around 900 BC, in the Middle Preclassic period. Over the Preclassic, it was closely affiliated with Chalchuapa and other early Maya sites in the territory of western El Salvador, as attested by the presence of the Lamatepeque, Jicalapa, Pinos, Izalco, Santa Tecla and other ceramic groups.

The eruption of Ilopango circa 540 AD marked the abandonment of Cara Sucia's region. The site was resettled a few decades later, perhaps around 600 AD, but the material culture of its new occupants represented a complete break with its Maya past, identifying it as a Cotzumalhuapa settlement. It was at this time that the main structures at the site were built, including an acropolis, two enclosed ballcourts, and a 14-meter-high pyramid, as well as several minor pyramids and platforms. The site's monumental core is relatively compact, and is divided by a massive terrace into two leveled areas. Cotzumalhuapan monumental architecture is commonly faced with field stone, and at Cara Sucia, large river cobbles were used, selected to be of similar size. The acropolis supported perishable thatched structures with wattle-and-daub walls which were burned at end of the site's occupation. Carbonized thatch from one of these structures yielded two calibrated radiocarbon dates of 920 AD each. Pottery from this period shares several types known from the central Cotzumalhuapa area, such as Tiquisate, as well as some local varieties. Mold-made figurines are very common, most of which functioned as whistles, and in the excavations conducted by Jorge Mejía, a burial was discovered with a set of figurine molds. Figurines reflect a diversity of local fauna (such as monkeys, felines, and macaws), but most frequently represent women. In consideration of the local variants in the material culture of Cara Sucia in regard to the central Cotzumalhuapa area, a distinct Late Classic phase was defined for the site: Tamasha.

The coastal plain around Cara Sucia is very suitable for growing cotton, and the abundance of malacates at the site indicates the importance of this crop and of textile manufacture. It has been suggested that the production of salt and cacao may have been other vital economic activities for the inhabitants of the site.

In addition to some small settlements with Tamasha occupation, two other affiliated monumental centers are presently known in El Salvador, La Danta (on the border with Guatemala) and Huiscoyolate (next to Izalco).

Four large stone sculptures have been found at Cara Sucia. They were removed from the site between the end of 19th and beginning of the 20th centuries, and their original locations within the site are unknown. The sculptures follow the canons of Cotzumalhuapa art. Only one of the sculptures (designated as Monument 1) is in the collection of the National Museum of Anthropology, and consists of a disk with a feline face. The Cotzumalhuapa culture is noted for its portable sculptures related with the ballgame, especially yokes and hachas, both of which have been found at Cara Sucia, La Danta, and Huiscoyolate.

Relations between the Tamasha area and that of the principal contemporary culture of western El Salvador, Payu, were apparently quite limited. The Payu commercial ware called Copador Polychrome was massively produced and distributed in its time, but is very scarcely represented at Cara Sucia. On the other hand, Tamasha figurines, which were very commonplace within their area, have only rarely been found at Payu sites.

The Tamasha phase has a Terminal Classic facet marked by the introduction of the Cozatol ceramic group and a local fine paste ware. Cara Sucia's abandonment in the early 10th century AD is a matter requiring further investigation. Although the burning of structures on the acropolis may suggest a violent end, it is equally possible that it was caused by lightning strikes following the site's abandonment, since at the time these structures the most prominent points on the coastal plain within a radius of kilometers.

== Studies ==
Historian Santiago Barberena was the first to mention Cara Sucia in 1892, and had Monument 1 transferred to the National Museum. The site was covered by coastal forest until 1964, when bulldozers were used to clear the land for growing cotton, resulting in severe damage to the site; witnesses relate that numerous small platforms (presumably residential) were completely destroyed at that time. In 1967, Stanley Boggs visited and mapped the exposed site. In 1986, Lee Parsons identified Cara Sucia as a Cotzumalhuapa site based on the style of its sculptures. The Hacienda Cara Sucia, in which the site was located, was expropriated by the 1980 Agrarian Reform. The estate was abandoned by its former owners, but a year elapsed before government authorities took effective control of the hacienda. Taking advantage of this vacuum of authority, hundreds of local residents began to loot Cara Sucia on a daily basis, eventually digging over 5,000 pits. Traffickers of antiquities circulated through the site to purchase artifacts as they were being found. This was the worst episode of archaeological depredation ever to take place in El Salvador, and artifacts from Cara Sucia were sold in the United States and other countries (this situation prompted the enactment of the first bilateral agreement between El Salvador and the United States for import restrictions of archaeological artifacts, subscribed in 1987). In 1981, the governmental Department of Archaeology acted to halt the looting, assigning Jorge Mejía to confront the looters and fence most of the site. Over a year and a half, Mejía conducted very extensive excavations on the acropolis and other structures. In 1983, Amaroli documented this work, as well as the damage from looting, and undertook limited excavations; in addition, the site was equipped with rustic infrastructure to open as an archaeological park, with a parking area, signage, interpretative center and an interpretative trail. This effort was aborted in 1984, when all financing was cut for Cara Sucia. Amaroli undertook further work at Cara Sucia in 1986, establishing that its relationship with the Cotzumalhuapa culture was not only in regard to its sculptures but also in its shared architecture and ceramics, findings which were summarized by Rafael Cobos. These ceramic relations were further demonstrated in the 2006 investigations by Regina Moraga, Elisa Mencos and Sébastien Perrot-Minnot.

In 1992 Cara Sucia was entered on the UNESCO World Heritage Tentative Lists, together with the El Imposible National Park.

== Visiting Cara Sucia ==
The Ministry of Culture currently maintains one park guard at Cara Sucia. The site can be visited, but there are no set hours, and most structures are covered by brush.
