= Bruce Coville bibliography =

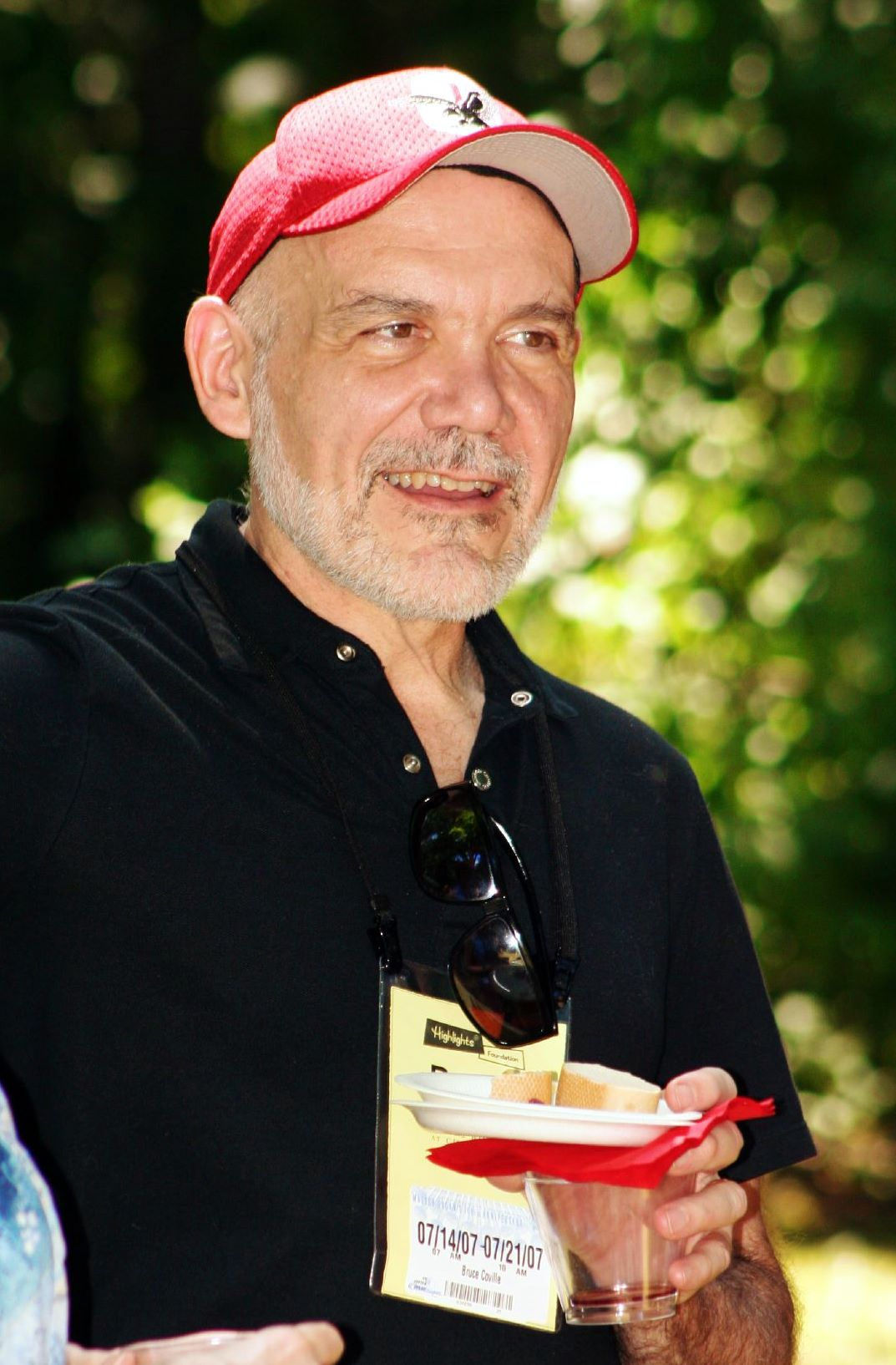
Coville in 2007

This Bruce Coville bibliography covers the over 100 books written by young adult fiction author Bruce Coville.

== Series ==
The Magic Shop

- The Monster's Ring. Aladdin (1989). ISBN 0-671-69389-1
- Jeremy Thatcher, Dragon Hatcher (1990). Aladdin (1992). ISBN 0-671-74782-7
- Jennifer Murdley's Toad. Minstrel (1993). ISBN 0-671-79401-9
- The Skull of Truth. Aladdin (1999). ISBN 0-671-02343-8
- Juliet Dove, Queen of Love. Harcourt (2003). ISBN 0-15-204561-9

My Teacher Is an Alien

- My Teacher Is an Alien. Aladdin (1989). ISBN 0-671-73729-5
- My Teacher Fried my Brains. Aladdin (1991). ISBN 0-671-72710-9
- My Teacher Glows in the Dark. Aladdin (1991). ISBN 0-671-72709-5
- My Teacher Flunked the Planet. Aladdin (1992). ISBN 0-671-75081-X

I Was a Sixth Grade Alien

- I Was a Sixth Grade Alien. Aladdin (1999). ISBN 0-671-02650-X
- The Attack of the Two-Inch Teacher. Aladdin (1999). ISBN 0-671-02651-8
- I Lost My Grandfather's Brain. Aladdin (1999). ISBN 0-671-02652-6
- Peanut Butter Lover Boy. Aladdin (2000). ISBN 0-671-02653-4
- Zombies of the Science Fair. Aladdin (2000). ISBN 0-671-02654-2
- Don't Fry My Veeblax! Aladdin (2000). ISBN 0-671-02655-0
- Too Many Aliens. Aladdin (2000). ISBN 0-671-02656-9
- Snatched From Earth. Aladdin (2000). ISBN 0-671-02657-7
- There's an Alien in My Backpack. Aladdin (2000). ISBN 0-671-02658-5
- The Revolt of the Miniature Mutants. Aladdin (2001). ISBN 0-671-02659-3
- There's an Alien in My Underwear. Aladdin (2001). ISBN 0-671-02660-7
- Farewell to Earth. Aladdin (2001). ISBN 0-671-02661-5

The Unicorn Chronicles

- Into the Land of the Unicorns. Scholastic (1994). ISBN 978-0-545-06824-6
- Song of the Wanderer. Scholastic (1999). ISBN 978-0-545-06825-3
- Dark Whispers. Scholastic (2008) ISBN 978-0-590-45952-5
- The Last Hunt. Scholastic (2010) ISBN 978-0-545-12807-0

Moongobble and Me

- The Dragon of Doom. Simon & Schuster (2003). ISBN 0-689-85754-3
- The Weeping Werewolf. Simon & Schuster (2004). ISBN 0-689-85755-1
- The Evil Elves. Simon & Schuster (2004). ISBN 0-689-85756-X
- The Mischief Monster Simon & Schuster (2007). ISBN 978-1-4169-0807-4
- The Naughty Nork Aladdin (2009). ISBN 978-1-4169-0810-4

Space Brat

- Space Brat ISBN 978-0-7857-6757-2
- Space Brat 2: Blork's Evil Twin ISBN 978-0-671-77713-5
- Space Brat 3: The Wrath of Squat ISBN 978-0-671-86844-4
- Space Brat 4: Planet of the Dips ISBN 978-0-671-50092-4
- Space Brat 5: The Saber-Toothed Poodnoobie ISBN 978-0-671-00870-3

Rod Albright Alien Adventures

- Aliens Ate My Homework
- I Left My Sneakers in Dimension X
- The Search for Snout (Aliens Stole My Dad in the UK)
- Aliens Stole My Body

Bruce Coville's Book of...

- Bruce Coville's Book of Monsters
- Bruce Coville's Book of Aliens
- Bruce Coville's Book of Ghosts
- Bruce Coville's Book of Nightmares
- Bruce Coville's Book of Spine Tinglers
- Bruce Coville's Book of Magic
- Bruce Coville's Book of Monsters II
- Bruce Coville's Book of Aliens II
- Bruce Coville's Book of Ghosts II
- Bruce Coville's Book of Nightmares II
- Bruce Coville's Book of Spine Tinglers II
- Bruce Coville's Book of Magic II

Shakespeare retellings

- The Tempest
- A Midsummer Night's Dream
- Macbeth
- Romeo and Juliet
- Hamlet
- Twelfth Night
- The Winter's Tale

Nina Tanleven

- The Ghost in the Third Row
- The Ghost Wore Gray
- The Ghost in the Big Brass Bed

The A. I. Gang

- Operation Sherlock
- The Cutlass Clue was written by Jim Lawrence
- Robot Trouble
- Forever Begins Tomorrow

Camp Haunted Hills

- How I Survived My Summer Vacation
- Some of My Best Friends Are Monsters
- The Dinosaur that Followed Me Home

Bruce Coville's Chamber of Horrors

- Amulet of Doom
- Spirits and Spells
- Eyes of the Tarot
- Waiting Spirit

The Enchanted Files

- Cursed. (Originally published as Diary of a Mad Brownie). Random House Books for Young Readers (2015). ISBN 0-385-39250-8
- Hatched. Random House Books for Young Readers (2016). ISBN 0-385-39255-9
- Trolled. Random House Books for Young Readers (2017) ISBN 978-038-539259-4

== Anthologies ==
- A Glory of Unicorns
- Half Human
- Herds of Thunder, Manes of Gold
- The Unicorn Treasury
- Bruce Coville's Shapeshifters
- Bruce Coville's Alien Visitors
- Bruce Coville's Strange Worlds
- Bruce Coville's UFOs
- Oddly Enough Simon & Schuster (1994). ISBN 0-671-51693-0
- Odder Than Ever (1999)
- Odds Are Good Harcourt (2006). ISBN 978-0-15-205716-9
- Oddest of All (2008)

== Young adult novels ==
- Armageddon Summer
- Fortune's Journey
- Space Station Ice-3 (published by Omni Odysseys)

== Middle grade novels ==
- The Dragonslayers
- Goblins in the Castle (1992) ISBN 0-671-72711-7
- Goblins on the Prowl
- Monster of the Year
- The Monsters of Morley Manor
- The World's Worst Fairy Godmother
- Thor's Wedding Day
- Always October
- Amber Brown is Tickled Pink (with Elizabeth Levy, September 13, 2012)
- Amber Brown Is on the Move (with Elizabeth Levy, September 12, 2013)
- Amber Brown Horses Around (with Elizabeth Levy, September 11, 2014)

== Picture books ==
- The Foolish Giant
- The Lapsnatcher
- My Grandfather's House
- The Prince of Butterflies
- Sarah and the Dragon
- Sarah's Unicorn
- Hans Brinker (retelling)

== Nonfiction ==
- Prehistoric People

== Contribution to the Dungeon series, organized by Philip José Farmer ==
- The Dark Abyss
