= Jayden Greig =

Canadian actor (born 2003)

- Born: October 19, 2003 (age 22); Mississauga, Ontario, Canada
- Occupation: Actor
- Years active: 2010–present

Jayden Greig (born October 19, 2003) is a Canadian actor best known for his lead role in Sean McNamara's film adaptation of Bruce Coville's novel, Aliens Ate My Homework on Netflix, and its sequel, Aliens Stole My Body. Jayden has also appeared in The Shape of Water (2017), Murdoch Mysteries (2013), Super Why (2015) and Playdate (2015–2016). He was nominated at the Young Entertainer Awards for Best Leading Young Actor in a Feature Film for his work in Aliens Ate My Homework and won Best Ensemble Performance in Film at the Young Artist Awards, amongst many other awards and nominations.

== Filmography ==
=== Film ===
Year	Title	Role	Notes
2011	Ten	young Tom Bennett	
2011	Huntersaurus	Hunter	
2012	My Toy Horse	Jack Fuller	
2012	Aeternus	Young Ray	
2012	Life Doesn't Frighten Me	Lion / Pinata Boy	
2013	Swim	Max	
2013	Mama	Orphaned Boy	
2013	Treading Water	Blonde Kid	
2014	We Were Wolves	Mika Blake	
2015	Stung	Mackenzie	
2016	Your Mother and I	Johnna's brother	
2017	The Shape of Water	Timmy Strickland	
2018	Aliens Ate My Homework	Rod Allbright	Main Role
2019	It's Nothing	Boy in park	
2020	Aliens Stole My Body	Rod Allbright	Main Role

=== Television ===
Year	Title	Role	Notes
2010	The Santa Suit	Santa's Village Kid	
2011	Change of Plans	School Boy	
2011	Nikita	Boy Pulling Wagon	
2011	Warehouse 13	Larson's Grandson	
2011	Rookie Blue	Birthday Party Child	
2011	Mistletoe Over Manhattan	Balloon Boy	
2011	Befriend and Betray	Background	
2012	I, Martin Short, Goes Home	Puppet Show Child	
2012	The L.A. Complex	Commercial Kid	
2012	Life with Boys	Young Sam	
2012	Flashpoint	Daycare Child	
2013	Paranormal Investigators	Billy	
2013	Cracked	Background	
2013	Alien Mysteries	Actor	
2014	The Strain	Keene Luss	
2015	Odd Squad	Agent O'Neil	
2015	Super Why!	Kids Voice	14 episodes
2015	Murdoch Mysteries	Bobby Brackenreid	6 episodes
2015	Playdate	Mac	52 episodes
2016	People of Earth	Young Biff Loman	
2017	Top Wing	Little Brother & Yuka	
2017	Man Seeking Woman	Gizmo	
2017	Space Ranger Roger	Brother	
2017	Space Riders: Division Earth	Jason	
2018	Condor	Young Church Singer	
2018	Titans	Football Kid #1	
2020	Grand Army	White Boy	

== Awards and nominations ==
Year	Award	Category	Work	Result
2016	Young Entertainer Awards	Best Young Actor 12 & Under – Voice Over Role	Playdate	Nominated
2018	Young Entertainer Awards	Best Supporting Young Actor – Feature Film	The Shape of Water	Nominated
2018	The Joey Awards	Best Ensemble in MOW or Video Feature	Aliens Ate My Homework	Won
2019	Young Artist Awards	Best Ensemble Performance in a Streaming Series or Film	Aliens Ate My Homework	Won
2019	Young Entertainer Awards	Best Leading Young Actor – Independent or Film Festival Feature Film	Aliens Ate My Homework	Nominated
2019	Young Entertainer Award	Best Young Ensemble Cast – Feature Film	Aliens Ate My Homework	Won
2020	The Joey Awards	Best Ensemble In a Feature Film	Aliens Stole My Body	Won
