= Aliens Ate My Homework (2018 film) =

Canadian children's film

- Aliens Ate My Homework
- Directed by: Sean McNamara
- Screenplay by: Judith Reeves-Stevens; Garfield Reeves-Stevens
- Story by: Bruce Coville
- Produced by: Eric Carnagey; Roger Lay Jr.
- Starring: Jayden Greig; William Shatner; Dan Payne
- Cinematography: Adam Sliwinski
- Edited by: Tony Dean Smith
- Music by: Brandon Moore
- Production company: Universal 1440 Entertainment
- Distributed by: Universal Pictures Home Entertainment
- Release date: March 6, 2018
- Country: United States
- Language: English

Aliens Ate My Homework is a 2018 American science fiction comedy film directed by Sean McNamara and based on Bruce Coville's novel of the same name. This film stars an ensemble cast, led by Jayden Greig, William Shatner, Dan Payne and Alex Zahara.

The film premiered on Netflix on March 6, 2018, in the United States. It was followed by a sequel, Aliens Stole My Body (2020).

== Plot ==
When a spaceship flies through his window and lands on his school work, Rod and his cousin Elspeth meet a group of extraterrestrial lawmen known as the Galactic Patrol. They must help their new alien friends foil the plans of interplanetary criminal BKR, who has been hiding on Earth as Billy Becker, a school bully with a passion for making Rod's life miserable.

== Cast ==
- Jayden Greig as Rod Allbright
- William Shatner as the voice of Phil the Plant
- Dan Payne as Grakker
- Tristan Risk as Madame Pong
- Alex Zahara as Tar Gibbons
- Lauren McNamara as Elspeth McMasters
- Ty Consiglio as Billy Becker
- Kirsten Robek as Gwen Allbright
- Christian Convery as Eric Allbright
- Carmela Guizzo as Linda Allbright
- Christine Lee as Ms. Maloney
- Sean Quan as Mickey
- Sandy Robson as Art Allbright
- Brad Proctor as Phil the Plant puppeteer
- Jamie Swettenham as Plink puppeteer

Bruce Coville also plays J. Carter, the principal of Rod's school, "Coville Elementary." The role is non-speaking until a mid-credits scene, where he delightedly reads a copy of the original Aliens Ate My Homework novel in his office and narrates the fate of BKR, the story's villain.

== Release ==
In March 2018, Universal Pictures Home Entertainment acquired distribution rights to the film, and set it for a March 6, 2018 release.

The film has an estimated domestic DVD sale value of $46,603.
