= Aliens Stole My Body =

1998 novel by Bruce Coville

- Author: Bruce Coville
- Language: English
- Series: Rod Albright Alien Adventures
- Subject: Science fiction
- Genre: Science fiction
- Publisher: Aladdin
- Publication date: August 1, 1998
- Publication place: United States
- Preceded by: The Search for Snout

Aliens Stole My Body is a children's science fiction novel by Bruce Coville that was first published in 1998. This is the fourth book in a series about the fictional character Rod Albright. The illustrations and the front cover were done by the author's wife, Katherine Coville.

== Plot summary ==
Aliens Stole My Body concludes the four-book series. After the departure of Selima Khan, the group characters from The Search for Snout splits up into three groups, Rod and Seymour head for the planet Kryndamar, along with Snout, Elspeth, and Madam Pong (the Diplomatic Officer of the Ferkel). Meanwhile, Grakker and Phil (the sentient plant who serves as the Ferkel's science officer) leave to re-establish contact with the Galactic Patrol, and Ah-Rit heads off with Tar Gibbons in an attempt to reclaim Rod's body from BKR.

While on Kryndamar, Rod begins training his mind with Snout, and later gains a few new allies: the intergalactic pet trader Mir-Van; his family; and his business partner Grumbo. They also encounter one of BKR's henchmen; from him, they learn that BKR has already discovered their deception: Rod's brain is empty. BKR still plans to use it as bait, and he intends to capture Rod's mom and younger twin siblings from Earth, to serve as more bait.

After arriving on Earth and locating Rod's family, the entire group (sans Grumbo, Mir-Van, and his family) are captured by BKR and his gang (including the traitorous Arly Bung) in the Merkel. The captives, along with Grakker, Phil, and Selima Khan, who are captured shortly before they were to leave the Solar System, are taken to BKR's headquarters. There, the entire group is joined by Ah-Rit and Tar Gibbons.

With all his enemies in one place, BKR delivers an ultimatum: reveal where they've hidden Rod's mind or die. Rod tells Snout to send him back to his own body. Using the skills that he's learned from both Tar Gibbons and Snout, Rod is able to take out all of BKR's crew, and finally BKR himself.

Following the defeat and capture of their enemies, Rod and his family are returned to Earth, though Rod will be able to return to space in the future. BKR and his gang are locked up and await trial. After a final goodbye to his teacher and friends, Rod watches as the Ferkel and its crew depart for GP headquarters so they can deliver BKR and his gang to stand trial. Ferkel and its crew must also stand trial, since they did break the law by going renegade instead of following orders.

== Other books in the series ==
- Aliens Ate My Homework
- I Left My Sneakers in Dimension X
- The Search for Snout

== Film Adaptation ==
Aliens Stole My Body is a film adaptation, directed by Sean McNamara. This film stars an ensemble cast, led by Jayden Greig, George Takei, Dan Payne and Alex Zahara. The film premiered on Netflix on August 4, 2020, in the United States.
