= Aliens Ate My Homework =

1993 book by Bruce Coville

- Author: Bruce Coville
- Language: English
- Series: Rod Albright's Alien Adventures
- Genre: Sci-fi
- Publisher: Aladdin
- Publication date: 1993
- Publication place: United States
- Followed by: I Left My Sneakers in Dimension X

Aliens Ate My Homework is the first of a series of four books by Bruce Coville. The series is generally referred to as Bruce Coville's Alien Adventures or Rod Allbright's Alien Adventures. Aliens Ate My Homework was first published by Aladdin in 1993. A movie based on the book premiered on Netflix in 2018.

== Film adaptation ==
Aliens Ate My Homework is a film adaptation, directed by Sean McNamara. This film stars an ensemble cast, led by Jayden Greig, William Shatner, Dan Payne, Christian Convery, and Alex Zahara. The film premiered on Netflix on March 6, 2018, in the United States.

== Other books in the series ==
- I Left My Sneakers in Dimension X
- The Search For Snout (UK title: Aliens Stole My Dad)
- Aliens Stole My Body
