= Aliens Stole My Body (film) =

Canadian children's film

- Aliens Stole My Body
- Directed by: Sean McNamara
- Screenplay by: Judith Reeves-Stevens; Garfield Reeves-Stevens
- Story by: Bruce Coville
- Produced by: Eric Carnagey; Roger Lay Jr.
- Starring: Jayden Greig; George Takei; Dan Payne
- Cinematography: Adam Sliwinski
- Edited by: Tony Dean Smith
- Music by: Brandon Moore
- Production company: Universal 1440 Entertainment
- Distributed by: Universal Pictures Home Entertainment
- Release date: August 4, 2020
- Country: United States
- Language: English

Aliens Stole My Body is a 2020 American adventure science fiction comedy film directed by Sean McNamara and based on Bruce Coville's novel of the same name. This film stars an ensemble cast, led by Jayden Greig, George Takei, Dan Payne and Alex Zahara.

The film premiered on Netflix on August 4, 2020, in the United States. It is the sequel to the 2018 film Aliens Ate My Homework.

== Plot ==
When the crew of the Ferkel learn that BKR has escaped from prison, they return to Earth to recruit Deputies Rod Allbright and Elspeth McMasters in their quest to foil his villainous plans. With Rod's friend Mickey tagging along, the heroes of the Galactic Patrol travel to the planet Mentat to rescue Rod's father, whose knowledge BKR needs to help him trap the entire galaxy in a single moment in time. The entire Allbright family gets involved in a final showdown at the edge of a black hole.

== Cast ==
- Jayden Greig as Rod Allbright
- George Takei as the voice of Phil the Plant
- Dan Payne as Grakker
- Tristan Risk as Madame Pong
- Alex Zahara as Tar Gibbons
- Lauren McNamara as Elspeth McMasters
- Sean Quan as Mickey
- Ty Consiglio as Billy Becker
- Sandy Robson as Art Allbright
- Kirsten Robeck as Gwen Allbright
- Christian Convery as Eric Allbright
- Carmela Guizzo as Linda Allbright
- Travis Turner as Lackey
- Christina Meredith Lewell as Arly Bung
- Brad Proctor as Phil the Plant puppeteer
- Jason Ward as Tar Gibbons/Plink puppeteer
- Phillip Mitchell as Stunt Guard #1
- Douglas Armstrong as Stunt Guard #2

Nearly the entire cast of Aliens Ate My Homework returns, although William Shatner is replaced by fellow Star Trek alumnus George Takei. Takei says his trademark line, "Oh Myyy," during the movie's climax. Bruce Coville cameos as a neighbor of the Allbright's who witnesses the arrival of the Ferkel, alongside two other neighborhood children who are reading a copy of the original Aliens Stole My Body book.

== Differences from the book ==
Unlike its predecessor, which faithfully adapted the story of a single novel, the film combines various plot points of the third and fourth books of the Rod Allbright Alien Adventures—The Search for Snout, and the movie's namesake, Aliens Stole My Body—into a single story, while adding many original elements of its own.

== Reception ==
On Common Sense Media, Jennifer Green rated it 2/5 stars writing, "campy sci-fi tale has low-budget effects, hokey humor."
