= Kristie Marsden =

Canadian actress

- Born: Kristie Nichole Marsden c. 1982 (age 43–44); Burnaby, British Columbia, Canada
- Occupation: Actress
- Years active: 2000–present

Kristie Marsden (born c. 1982) is a Canadian actress from British Columbia.

== Career ==
Marsden was the youngest Canadian actress to play the role of Sophie in the touring edition of the Broadway musical Mamma Mia! She played the role for 832 performances.

She has also guest starred on numerous television shows, such as The 4400, Psych, Supernatural, Saved, Masters Of Horror, Dark Angel and many more. She made her feature film debut in 2005, in the Warner Bros. picture The Sisterhood of the Traveling Pants. Marsden has also been heard as a voiceover actress on various cartoon and anime shows, such as Fraw Bow in Mobile Suit Gundam, Mary Kate and Ashley in Action and Alienators: Evolution Continues. She played the regular role of Erin on The N network's 2007 comedy series About A Girl.

== Filmography ==
=== Film ===
- The Sisterhood of the Traveling Pants (2005) — Olivia

=== Television ===
- Blind Date (2001)
- Dark Angel (2001)
- 2Gether (2001)
- Freedom (2001)
- These Arms of Mine (2001)
- Animal Miracles (2001)
- The Chris Isaak Show (2001)
- Wolf Lake (2001)
- Maybe It's Me (2001) (episode: "The Pilot Episode")
- Strange Frequency (2001)
- I Was A Teenage Faust (2002)
- Just Deal (2002)
- Beyond Belief: Fact or Fiction (2002)
- Brainfart (2004)
- Reefer Madness (2005)
- Supernatural (2005)
- Masters Of Horror (2006)
- Saved (2006)
- Psych (2007)
- The 4400 (2007)
- About a Girl (2007) (main role)

=== Voiceover/Anime ===
- Mobile Suit Gundam (2001)
- Mary-Kate and Ashley in Action! (2001)
- Alienators: Evolution Continues (2001)
- Mobile Suit Gundam for PS3 (2006)
- The Girl Who Leapt Through Time (2009)
- Iron Man: Armored Adventures (2012)...Madame Masque
- The Little Prince (2015) as Onyx (episodes 11–12, "The Planet of Jade")

== Theatre ==
- Mamma Mia! (2002–2004)
- The Music Man
- Fiddler on the Roof
- The Wizard of Oz
- Somewhere in the World
- Pélagie
- Caledonia
- The King & I
- Anne of Green Gables
- Oklahoma!
- Oliver!
- Joseph and the Amazing Technicolor Dreamcoat
