= Greenbacks (Once Upon a Time) =

- Once Upon a Time episode
- Episode no.: Season 7 Episode 5
- Directed by: Geofrey Hildrew
- Written by: Christopher Hollier; Adam Karp

Guest appearances
- Adelaide Kane as Drizella/Ivy; Emma Booth as Witch; Robin Givens as Eudora; Daniel Francis as Dr. Facilier; Kevin Ryan as Robert; Sandy Robson as Sam Ochotta

Episode chronology
← Previous "Beauty"	Next → "Wake Up Call"
- Once Upon a Time season 7

"Greenbacks" is the fifth episode of the seventh season and the 138th episode overall of the American fantasy-drama series Once Upon a Time. Written by Christopher Hollier & Adam Karp and directed by Geofrey Hildrew, it premiered on ABC in the United States on November 3, 2017.

In the episode, Tiana's backstory is detailed involving her encounter with Dr. Facilier, while in the present day Ivy wants Henry to help her find out about what Victoria is up to, Jacinda and Sabine come up with an idea to make money that Victoria is determined to sabotage, and Rogers tries to get information on a missing person that someone else is also seeking.

== Plot ==
=== Opening sequence ===
A firetruck is featured in the background.

=== Characters' past ===
In the years before Henry's arrival to their realm, Tiana and her mother Eudora are trying to keep their castle from being sold, as Tiana and her mother are no longer royalty in the wake of her father dying. Tiana decides to seek out a suitor in the hopes of solving her problems; she goes to a town where, after dealing with unruly beggars, she comes across a mysterious individual named Doctor Facilier. He tells Tiana that he can help her find her prince with the aid of his magic, but that it will cost her. On Facilier's advice, Tiana follows his direction to find the “Red Crow,” which turns out to be a tavern. As she is being attacked for her earrings, Tiana is saved by a man named Prince Marias, who asks to have dinner with her. Tiana later brings Marias back to her castle and tells him about her late father while showing off the Firefly Ruby, the family's remaining heirloom. Marias agrees to help Tiana, but Tiana catches him trying to steal the ruby. He explains that he isn't actually a prince, just a commoner who has made a deal with Facilier, to give him the ruby in exchange for reuniting with his love, who has been turned into a frog. After understanding the situation, Tiana lets Marias go.

After receiving advice from Eudora, Tiana takes it upon herself to deliver the ruby to Facilier in exchange for the frog, claiming that the ruby doesn't possess any power, since she has the power inside her. Facilier, however, is in no mood to break off the deal, as he wants to keep the ruby and the frog. Tiana immediately threatens him with a sword, but Facilier responds by using a voodoo doll he made in her likeness to injure her. Tiana is able to rescue the frog, but Facilier uses his magic to disappear with the ruby.

Tiana later returns the frog to Marias, who thanks her. He kisses the frog, using true love's kiss to break the curse that Facilier placed on them; it turns out that instead of his transforming the frog into a princess, it's the other way around, as Marias transforms back into a frog and is reunited with his love. The two frogs look at Tiana in gratitude and hop away into a nearby stream together.

=== Seattle ===
At Belfrey Towers, Victoria visits the secret room to see the witch, demanding that she help her to remove Lucy's belief so Anastasia can be brought back to life. The witch instead asks for tea, refusing to help Victoria unless she complies.

Meanwhile, Sabine shows up to give Lucy some of her beignets, but is confronted by Victoria, who reveals that she plans to increase the rent for her and Jacinda's apartment. Sabine comes up with an idea to solve the problem by convincing Jacinda into selling her beignets with the supplies she bought with the rent money, to which Jacinda agrees. The two set up shop at Mr. Clucks, where they find success with the business. The restaurant is burned down on orders from Victoria, although Sabine does save the money they made. With the restaurant now in ruins, Jacinda lashes out at Sabine for costing her her job, upsetting Lucy, who talks to Sabine about not giving up. Sabine plans to leave town, but Jacinda apologizes and surprises her with a gift (a secondhand food truck that they can use to sell her food), and they reconcile.

At the same time, Roni asks Henry about his friendship with Ivy, and advises him that he should be pursuing Jacinda instead. At Belfrey Towers, Victoria is demanding a lot more out of Ivy, which angers her. Ivy sees Victoria visiting the secret room on the Tower's security cameras, and calls Henry to ask him for help in finding out what Victoria is up to. However, Roni sees the text come in on Henry's phone and deletes it to protect him, before going to the Tower and meeting with Ivy herself. They access the secret room, where they find a cup of tea and a picture, revealed to be one of her (as Regina) and a younger Henry back in Storybrooke, which surprises and confuses Roni, as she has no memories of Storybrooke. She later shows the picture to Henry, who identifies the boy as himself.

At the police station, Rogers tries to get information from a criminal involving Eloise Gardner, the missing girl that he has been trying to find for the past ten years, after recognizing a tattoo that he saw on the man that matches a symbol in Eloise‘s sketch book. The man dodges Rogers' questions, but explains that the symbol is meant to ward off evil; however, the man is later seen spying on Rogers, and calls someone to inform them that Rogers is looking for Eloise.

Back at the Tower, Ivy visits the secret room to see the witch. It is revealed that they have known each other all along, with Ivy using Henry and Roni in her scheme to destroy and overthrow Victoria. Not only that, Ivy reveals that she is also awake from the curse, as she reminds the witch that her name is not Ivy, it's Drizella.

== Production ==
- Two exterior scenes with Henry and Roni, one where they are walking down the street together, and one where they are sitting together on a bench at night, were deleted from the episode.
- The VanDusen Botanical Garden in Vancouver doubled as the garden in the scene featuring Tiana and Eudora.
- In French-Language countries (including Canada, where Once Upon a Time is filmed and produced), the episode is titled as "Jamais Mieux Servi que par Soi-même" (“Never Better Served Than by Oneself”); Tiana, Eudora, Marius, and Facilier are of French background, as French phrases and meanings like “Nouveau riche” (a Newly Rich person of wealth acquired through family), “Fête de faillite” (a party to celebrate a person's bankruptcy or monetary failure) and “Enchanté” (“Nice to meet you”) are used.
- Upon discovering the success of the beignet operation, Belfrey makes a call to someone named "Ralph," telling him to go to the restaurant and "wreck it." This is a reference to the main character in the eponymous Disney film Wreck-It Ralph.

== Casting ==
- While Mekia Cox became a series regular in this episode, the press releases still had her listed as guest starring, as her announcement to promote her to series regular was made after production began.
- This is the first episode this season that Robert Carlyle, who is still credited, does not appear.
- Sandy Robson appears in a major co-starring role.

== Reception ==
The episode received mixed to positive reviews with critics citing Mekia Cox's performance helped lift a less impressive story in this installment, but saved the best takeaways for Adelaide Kane during the episode's final scene.

Paul Dailly of TV Fanatic gave it a 4.2 out of 5 stars: “‘Greenbacks' was another solid episode of Once Upon a Time Season 7. There have been some rough points in this rebooted version of the show, but it is finally finding its footing, and I cannot wait to see how the rest of the season plays out.”

Entertainment Weekly's Justin Kirkland gave it a B.

Nick Hogan of TVOvermind gave the episode a 3.0 out of 5 stars rating, stating that this episode was a mixed bag and would like to see less backstories like Tiana/Sabine and more focused storylines on Henry, Rogers and Roni. He also gave good reviews to Adelaide Kane's performance in this outing and saw the twist as the best highlight in the episode.
