= Peter Corbeau =

Fictional character in Marvel Comics

Publication information
- Publisher: Marvel Comics
- First appearance: The Incredible Hulk vol. 2 #148
- Created by: Archie Goodwin (writer); Herb Trimpe (artist)

In-story information
- Abilities: Genius-Level Intellect

Peter Corbeau is a fictional character appearing in American comic books published by Marvel Comics.

== Publication history ==
Peter Corbeau first appeared in The Incredible Hulk vol. 2 #148 and was created by Archie Goodwin and Herb Trimpe.

== Fictional character biography ==
Peter Corbeau is a college roommate of Bruce Banner and the creator of Starcore. When the army manages to capture the Hulk with tranquilizer bombs, they bring him to Corbeau. Corbeau uses a device that manipulates the sun's rays, which neutralizes the gamma energy enough to regress the Hulk back to Banner.

An old friend of Professor X, Corbeau rescues Professor X and the X-Men from Sentinels during Christmas. When the X-Men are captured and taken into space, Corbeau uses his connections with NASA to launch a Starcore shuttle into space to rescue them. The space station's owner Steven Lang informs the captive Professor X, Corbeau, Cyclops, and Jean Grey that he went over the Sentinel notes and has been given funding from the Council of the Chosen to start Project: Armageddon in order to wipe out mutants. Cyclops frees himself from his containment and then frees the others. Grey safely returns the X-Men to Earth and emerges as Phoenix.

== Powers and abilities ==
Peter Corbeau has genius-level intellect.

== In other media ==
- Peter Corbeau appears in the X-Men: The Animated Series multi-part episode "The Phoenix Saga".
- Peter Corbeau appears in the Iron Man: Armored Adventures episode "Fun with Lasers", voiced by Alex Zahara. This version is an agent of S.H.I.E.L.D.
- Peter Corbeau appears in The Avengers: Earth's Mightiest Heroes episode "Operation Galactic Storm", voiced by Chris Cox. This version is a commander of S.W.O.R.D. who is in charge of the ship Falchion.
