= Beauty (Once Upon a Time) =

- Once Upon a Time episode
- Episode no.: Season 7 Episode 4
- Directed by: Mick Garris
- Written by: Dana Horgan; Leah Fong

Guest appearances
- Emilie de Ravin as Belle/Mrs. Gold; Adelaide Kane as Drizella/Ivy; Giles Matthey as Morpheus/Gideon; Rose Reynolds as Alice/Tilly; Anton Starkman as young Gideon

Episode chronology
← Previous "The Garden of Forking Paths"	Next → "Greenbacks"
- Once Upon a Time season 7

"Beauty" is the fourth episode of the seventh season and the 137th episode overall of the American fantasy-drama series Once Upon a Time. Written by Dana Horgan & Leah Fong and directed by Mick Garris, it premiered on ABC in the United States on October 27, 2017.

In the episode, Rumpelstiltskin's life with Belle is explored and the consequences that awaits the couple, while in the present, Weaver must deal with a suddenly unstable Tilly, when Victoria demands that she be brought back under his control, and Ivy takes Lucy out for a Halloween trick-or-treat that goes awry.

== Plot ==
=== Opening sequence ===
Halloween themed decorations are seen in the forest

=== In the characters' past ===
It has been a year after the Final Battle, and Gold and Belle now enjoy life in Storybrooke as a family with their son Gideon. On Gideon's first birthday, Gold tells Belle that he has acquired a family travel book so they can document their adventures.

The family leaves Storybrooke and spends years travelling the realms, however age begins to catch up to Belle. Rumple has now grown tired of being The Dark One and wants to rid himself of the cursed immortality and darkness once and for all. He takes the dagger and throws it into a wishing river, only for it to instantly return to him. He vows to Belle that he will find a way to dispose of it. As the years continue to go by, Gideon, now a bookworm like his mother, leaves for college at 18, while Rumpelstiltskin and Belle continue to look for a way to get rid of the dagger. Belle finds a solution which says they must travel to the Edge of Realms and wait for sunset after an eternal day, which will finally allow them to get rid of the dagger and the darkness forever.

As Rumple and Belle arrived to the Edge of Realms, they realise that as the day is eternal then the sun may never set. Belle suggests that the two settle down and enjoy their life in this location. The two decided to build a nice home for the family, where they live for many years happily together, with Gideon visiting frequently.

One day, many years later, as Belle checks the drapes, she collapses. A distraught Rumple suggests that he uses his powers to heal her and reverse her aging, only to discover that Belle had known he couldn't dispose of the dagger here. She knew, from ages ago, that the "sunset" referred to in the prophecy signified her own death, and wanted to live a happy life with Rumple and Gideon before passing, which she did. In her final moments, she asks that Rumple let her go, but tells him that once he is rid of the dagger that he'll return to her. With that, Belle passes away peacefully, leaving Rumple sobbing and heartbroken.

At Belle's grave, Gideon, having returned to pay respects to his mother, offers to take the dagger and use it to transfer the darkness into himself so that Rumple can join his wife in death. Rumple refuses, not wanting another one of his sons to be lost because of his darkness. He also reveals that he already has someone else ready to hand the dagger over to: a mysterious Guardian.

Some time later Rumple steps through a portal into the New Enchanted Forest and instantly runs into Alice from Wonderland, revealing that she is to be his Guardian.

=== In Seattle ===
It's Halloween Day in Hyperion Heights, where Weaver is having a brief but awkward conversation with Tilly, who is wearing a rabbit mask. Later on in Victoria's car, Tilly surprises Victoria and tells her that she knows about who she is. Victoria uses pepper spray on Tilly and ends up taking Tilly's backpack. Victoria then talks to Weaver about Tilly's actions, and insists that Tilly takes her "pills", as it keeps her from remembering that she is actually Alice. Victoria warns Weaver to do this or he'll pay dearly. The situation with Tilly spills over into the disagreements between Rogers and Weaver to the point of him telling Rogers that he doesn't care about anyone. Hours later, Weaver finds Tilly to ask her why she stopped taking the pills. Tilly believes that everyone in Hyperion Heights are all pieces of the same puzzle, but they're all "wearing masks" (a reference to the Halloween theme of the episode). Weaver asked Tilly to elaborate further but she said she'd rather show him.

The two then head at the train tracks for the answer, and while en route Weaver handed Tilly a sandwich that was secretly laced with the pills' ingredients. Suddenly Tilly, having bitten into the sandwich, begins complaining about the pills making her small and, in a White Rabbit-eqse fashion, bails out of the vehicle. When Weaver catches up to Tilly, she insists that she is this close to revealing the answer and pulls out Belle's chipped teacup in front of Weaver. After trying hard to remember, she recalls his true name: Rumpelstiltskin, and even though this triggers a flashback, Weaver doesn't seem to remember his past and still deems Tilly as crazy. Tilly then takes Weaver's gun and fatally shoots him in order to prove that he is immortal. Hours later at a hospital, Weaver is in a comatose state, where he sees a vision of Belle's spirit, before regaining consciousness. Weaver tells Rogers to file a report that it was a robber who shot him and orders for Tilly to be let go, in order to let off Tilly. Rogers and Tilly play a game of chess in the waiting area of the hospital, with Tilly now back on her pills and oblivious again of her previous life as Alice.

In between the situation, Jacinda drops off Lucy's Halloween costume to Ivy, who has been tasked with taking her step-niece around the neighborhood to get candy. However Ivy's distraction with her cell phone just gave Lucy the opportunity to give Ivy the slip. Around the same time, Roni consoles Henry after trying to get used to having lost his family, but suggested that he move on and try to find happiness again by pursuing Jacinda. Henry then visits Jacinda at her workplace but the conversation is cut short when they learn that Ivy lost Lucy, and since Jacinda can't leave her job, Henry volunteers to help find Lucy. Later that night, Henry catches up with Ivy, and as they search for Lucy, Ivy tells Henry about how she feels about her mother, saying that she feels alone and always on the wrong side of things. Henry then figured out where to find Lucy and Ivy finds her. The three then returned to Mr. Clucks, but Ivy insists that Jacinda take Lucy trick or treating with Henry.

Afterwards, Victoria confronts Weaver with blackmail if he doesn't keep Tilly on her medication, but Weaver isn't having any of this. During the confrontation he refers to Victoria using his old endearment word, "Dearie", implying he is now "awake" from the curse. Meanwhile, at Roni's, Ivy treats Henry to a few drinks as a thanks for his helpful encouragement given earlier on the bench.

== Production ==
The montage of Belle and Rumple building their house together contains many visual references to the opening of Disney/Pixar's 2009 animated film Up, including the process of building their house, the design of the house itself, the twin chairs, and the picnics as many years go by, culminating in Belle's collapse and death as Ellie did in the film. The score in this scene is also reminiscent of Michael Giacchino's score for the film in terms of tone, instrumentation, and chord progression.

As with “A Pirate’s Life,” both Carlyle and De Ravin knew about the outcome of their characters before production began on the episode. This was also the third episode in the series run to reveal an LGBT character, this time being Alice/Tilly (she mentions having an ex-girlfriend).

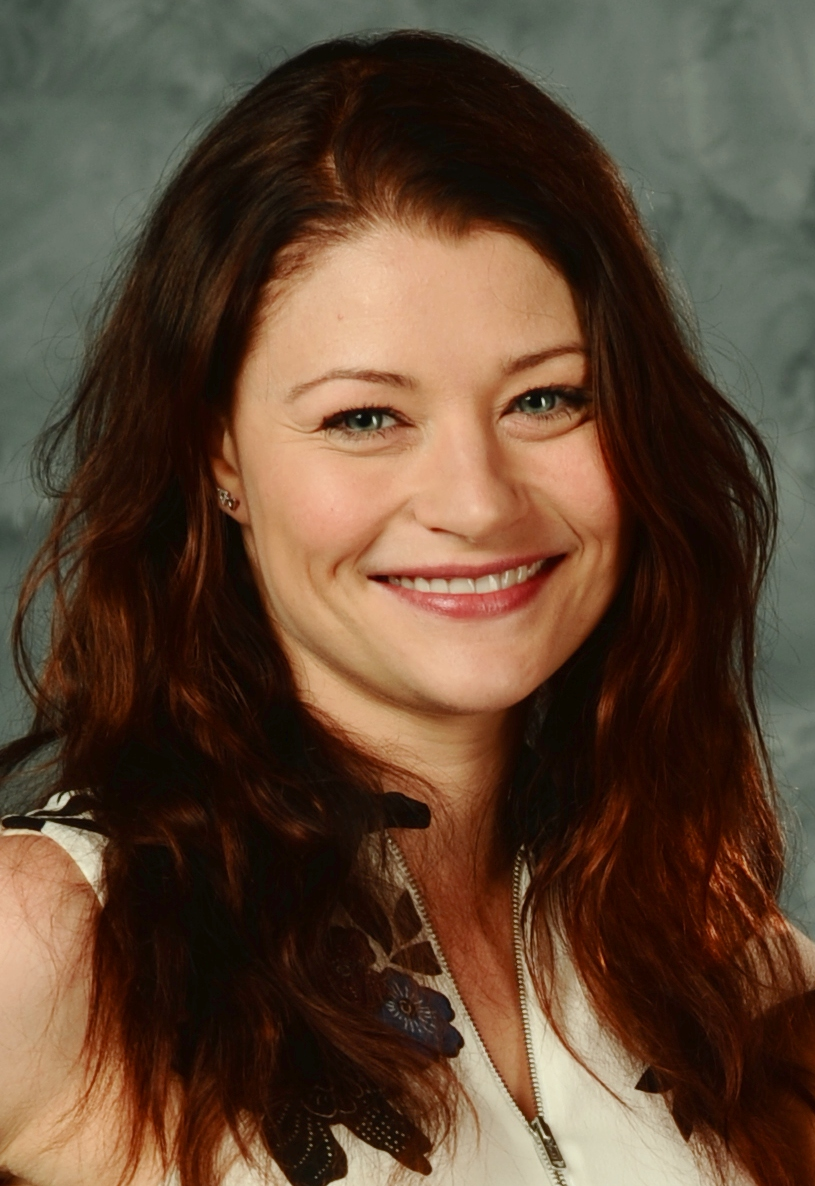
de Ravin's final performance as Belle received critical acclaim

== Casting ==
- It also marked the return of recurring guest star Giles Matthey and guest star Anton Starkman in guest roles.
- The episode also used footage from previous episodes during the montage that showed key moments in the love story of Belle and Rumple. It featured archival footage of Sage Brocklebank, Eric Keenleyside, Raphael Sbarge and Chris Shields as their respective characters.

== Reception ==
=== Reviews ===
The episode received critical acclaim with critics praising Horgan and Fong's writing, Garris' directing, production value, cinematography, and the performances of Robert Carlyle and Emilie de Ravin.

Paul Dailly of TV Fanatic gave it a 4.2 out of 5 stars: “‘Beauty’ was the best episode of Once Upon a Time in quite some time. It was nice to catch up with Belle once again, but at the same time, it sucked to see her die in favor of continuing Rumple's storyline.”

Entertainment Weekly's Justin Kirkland gave it an A: “So, I’m going to say something major: This episode, in this seventh season that many of us have admittedly been extremely skeptical about, gave us a true Once Upon a Time moment. And man, was it painfully worth it. Let’s reflect. Let’s cry a little, maybe.”

Nick Hogan of TVOvermind gave the episode a 5.0 out of 5 stars rating, stating “I’ve been skeptical at best during this new season, and long seasons can feel like a slog sometimes, but “Beauty” was an exercise in catharsis and told a story that almost every fan, both new and old, wanted to know. I haven't had an emotional experience like this watching Once Upon A Time in several years, and I have nothing but kudos for this effort.”
