= Juliet Dove, Queen of Love =

2003 book by Bruce Coville

- Author: Bruce Coville
- Language: English
- Publication date: 2003
- Publication place: United States

Juliet Dove, Queen of Love is a Magic Shop book by Bruce Coville and published in 2003.

== Plot summary ==
Juliet Dove, a girl in the sixth grade, gets lured into a shop and is given a magical and incredibly strong crystal amulet. The amulet cannot come off and she realizes that she is in a story. In order for her to be free, she has to complete it. The amulet makes the person that wears it truly, strongly and deeply romantically attractive to the opposite gender. With the help of two rats that can talk, who are friends of the shop owner, she finds out the amulet was given to her by Eris, the goddess of chaos and discord. She is embarrassed by the group of boys that follow her, as she has unwittingly captivated and charmed them to her romantic love and affections.

== Reception ==
Louise Brueggemann, of Booklist, reviewed the book saying, "Coville's easy style works well in a tale that has its share of both humor and heartache. Fans of the Magic Shop series will enjoy this latest installment". B. Allison Gray, of School Library Journal, reviewed the book saying, "Coville capably interweaves mythological characters with realistic modern ones, keeping readers truly absorbed". Kliatt reviewed the audio book.
