= The Monsters of Morley Manor =

2001 book by Bruce Coville

The Monsters of Morley Manor (sometimes subtitled A Madcap Adventure) is a children's fantasy/sci-fi/horror novel written by Bruce Coville, published in 2001. It was originally serialized in Bruce Coville's series of short story anthologies. For example, one chapter of the story introduces aliens into the plot, and that chapter was published in Bruce Coville's Book of Aliens II. Another chapter features ghosts and was published in Bruce Coville's Book of Ghosts II. An article in Horn Book Magazine mentioned the book as part of a "developing undercurrent of fantastical humor" following the success of Harry Potter.

The story follows that of sixth-grader Anthony and his little sister Sarah. They discover some small figurines of monsters (such as a werewolf, a medusa, and other familiar creatures) in an old abandoned house. But when the figures get wet, they come to life, and later grow to life-size. The boy and other children join them on a quest involving aliens, angels, and ghosts.

The book won a WMLA Sasquatch Reading Award.
