= About a Girl (TV series) =

Canadian television series

- Genre: Comedy
- Created by: Adam Tobin
- Starring: Chiara Zanni; Jesse Hutch; Marshall Porter; Sandy Robson; Braden Williams; Kristie Marsden; Chelan Simmons
- Opening theme: "Blue Kitchen" by Combine the Victorious
- Composers: Hal Beckett; Daniel Ingram
- Country of origin: Canada
- Original language: English
- No. of seasons: 1
- No. of episodes: 13

Production
- Executive producers: Tim O'Donnell; Shawn Williamson; Stephen Heyges
- Producer: Cynthia Chapman
- Cinematography: Philip Linzey
- Editors: Luis Lam; Roger Mattiussi
- Camera setup: Single-camera
- Running time: 22–24 minutes
- Production companies: Brightlight Pictures; Student Body II Productions

Original release
- Network: Global
- Release: October 5, 2007 – February 29, 2008

About a Girl is a Canadian comedy television series that premiered on October 5, 2007, on Global in Canada and on Noggin's teen block, The N in the United States. It was the first scripted comedy on The N. After 13 episodes within a single season, no more new episodes were produced and it was never released on home media.

== Plot ==
About a Girl centers around Amy Ryan, a college student who moves into a house off-campus when her dorm room turns out to be unacceptable. However, her new roommates are four guys. Things are not always smooth as she tries to either adjust to or change their habits and wrestles with her unrequited attraction to one of them.

== Characters ==
=== The roommates ===
- Amy Ryan (Chiara Zanni) – A sophomore girl in college that believed would be not as difficult, "a walk in the park." After the college dorms are a dud, she had to move in with four guys (Jason, Dude, McRitchie, and Benny), rather than living in the college dorm rooms.
- Jason (Jesse Hutch) – One of the roommates that Amy lives with and who Amy has a crush on. The problem is he has a commitment issue in relationships.
- Benny (Marshall Porter) – He is the youngest of the roommates and also the cleanest, but does not pay attention to what his messy roommates do to the house. He also has a crush on Amy, but does not think he will get anything, but Amy is the one person that Benny seems comfortable talking to.
- Dude (Sandy Robson) – He is usually eccentric and relaxed and gives his roommates some helpful insight. He is also the landlord for the house that he, Jason, McRitchie, Benny, and Amy live in.
- McRitchie (Braden Williams) – He does not think before he acts, disregarding the consequences that could happen with his actions. Also, he acts like Amy's bodyguard since he is protective of her.

=== Other characters ===
- Erin (Kristie Marsden) – Amy's best friend that is all about boys and about having fun. She is straight forward and blunt when it comes to the truth, even if it may be considered harsh.
- Stacy – aka 'Laguna Bitch' (Chelan Simmons) – One of Amy's peer that is there to make fun of her in front of classmates.
- Mrs. Ryan (Lynda Boyd) – Amy's mother and also refers to her as "Crazy Lady".
- Felicia (Amber Borycki) – Jason's girlfriend, but they are always breaking up and then making up.
- Stan (aka "Stan the Man") (Dustin Milligan) – Stan was the 5th roommate until he left to go on tour with a band called State of Shock.

== Episodes ==
No.	Title	Directed by	Written by	Original release date	Prod. code
1	"About a Pilot"	Neal Israel	Adam Tobin	October 5, 2007	101
Amy Ryan is starting her sophomore year of college and moves in with Jason, McRitchie, Benny, and Dude.
2	"About the Rules"	Mina Shum	Mike Langworthy	October 12, 2007	102
Tired of the house being a constant mess, Amy starts to enforce new rules around the house, but the guys don't like them.
3	"About a Job"	James Genn	Maisha Closson	October 19, 2007	103
Amy gets a job on campus but her employer is giving her some unwanted attention.
4	"About a Flood"	Brian K. Roberts	Adam Tobin	October 26, 2007	104
The Alpha sorority house floods and Stacy stays at the guy's house.
5	"About a Break-Up"	Mina Shum	Laurie Parres	November 2, 2007	105
Amy's boyfriend breaks up with her and she's having a hard time dealing with it.
6	"About a Visit"	Mark Sawers	Maisha Closson	November 9, 2007	106
Amy's mother visits her but doesn't know that she is living with four guys.
7	"About a Dream"	Brain K. Roberts	Amy Engelberg & Wendy Engelberg	November 16, 2007	107
Amy has a romantic dream about Jason and Benny has a romantic dream about Amy.
8	"About a Prank"	Neal Israel	Amy Engelberg & Wendy Engelberg	January 19, 2008	108
Amy and the guys prank each other.
9	"About an F-Word"	Brain K. Roberts	Amy Engelberg & Wendy Engelberg	January 26, 2008	109
Amy drops out of her major after she fails a test.
10	"About an All-Niter"	Pat Williams	Laurie Parres	February 9, 2008	110
Amy teaches the guys how to properly study by taking them to the library, but the guys find other things to "study" while there.
11	"About a Boot"	Pat Williams	Maisha Closson & Laurie Parres	February 16, 2008	111
Amy gets pulled over for speeding and her car gets booted when the officer informs her of 171 unpaid parking tickets.
12	"About a Tent"	Brain K. Roberts	Adam Tobin	February 22, 2008	112
Amy, Erin, and the guys go camping. McRitchie and Benny come across a nudist gathering.
13	"About a Homecoming"	Brain K. Roberts	Story by : Tim O'Donnell; Teleplay by : Mike Langworthy and Tim O'Donnell	February 29, 2008	113
Stan "The Man" comes home for a band gig. Erin tells Amy the real reason why Stan returned. Stan tells Jason that he should prioritize Amy because Stan won't be on tour forever. Then Jason asks Amy to go out on a date.
