= 'Twas the Night (film) =

2001 movie directed by Nick Castle

- Film poster
- Teleplay by: Jim Lincoln; Dan Studney; Jenny Tripp
- Story by: Jim Lincoln; Dan Studney
- Directed by: Nick Castle
- Starring: Josh Zuckerman; Brenda Grate; Jefferson Mappin; Rhys Williams; Bryan Cranston
- Theme music composer: Craig Safan
- Country of origin: United States
- Original language: English

Production
- Executive producers: Robert M. Myman; George Paige; Tim Stephen
- Producer: Kevin Lafferty
- Cinematography: Milan Podsedly
- Editors: Patrick Kennedy; Duncan Christie
- Running time: 87 minutes
- Production company: Adam Productions

Original release
- Network: Disney Channel
- Release: December 7, 2001

'Twas the Night is a 2001 American Christmas fantasy comedy film that was released as a Disney Channel Original Movie. It was directed by Nick Castle and stars Josh Zuckerman, Brenda Grate, Bryan Cranston and Jefferson Mappin. It was first aired on December 7, 2001 on Disney Channel for Christmas.

== Plot ==
A troubled and irresponsible man named Nick Wrigley (Bryan Cranston) is hacked by criminals who are looking for a bank account code to Nick's boss. The criminals Bill (Jeff Geddis) and Harry (Sandy Robson) manage to find his apartment and start deriding him for the Internet scam he has pulled on them, losing $30,000 in the process. They tell him they want their money by Christmas or else they will have their enforcer Eliot (Jung-Yul Kim) beat him up. Bill and Harry leave and Nick decides to run away. Nick is leaving the building when Eliot sees him leaving and chases him. Nick manages to escape when he runs to a North Pole stage where kids meet Santa Claus. He steals the costume for Santa Claus and walks to the bus stop in disguise and goes to his brother's house.

Meanwhile, the house's mischievous 14-year-old Danny Wrigley (Josh Zuckerman) welcomes his uncle because he has a better relationship with him than any other person in his family. Danny's father, John (Barclay Hope) however is less than thrilled to see his older brother, while his wife, Abby (Torri Higginson) welcomes Nick. Danny's parents, both doctors, are called into the hospital and reluctantly leave Nick to look after their three children. After receiving a threatening e-mail from Bill and Harry that they are currently tracking him down to get the money out of him, Nick ends up having to unleash a virus to throw them off his trail. On Christmas Eve, Santa comes to the house with a device that can freeze time, in order to put the family's presents under the tree unnoticed. An object hits the device, time goes back to normal, and Nick hits him unconscious. They decide to deliver Santa's presents. While Nick is delivering the presents, unbeknown to Danny he is stealing from the houses. When Danny finds out that Nick is stealing he feels betrayed and goes back home in Santa's sleigh.

Meanwhile, Danny's younger siblings, Kaitlyn (Brenda Grate) and Peter (Rhys Williams) find an unconscious Santa (Jefferson Mappin) on the floor of their living room. He wakes up and convinces them that he is Santa. They find out that Danny and Nick have stolen the sleigh and presents and Santa says that Danny will be on the naughty list forever. When Danny comes back he apologizes to Santa, but the sleigh is broken.

Nick is sitting at a bus stop when he sees Bill, Harry, and Eliot. They ask him where the address to his brother's house is as they don't recognize him because he is wearing a Santa costume. Nick doesn't answer them and they drive off. Nick realizes a second later they are going to his brother's house, which means that his family is in trouble. Nick, who still has Santa's device, races back to the house and get there just in time. He saves his family from the men using the device to shrink Eliot. This causes Bill, Harry, and Eliot to drive away terrified. Nick returns the device to Santa and then gives Santa his beloved laptop to fix Santa's sleigh and save Christmas.

The next morning, Nick wakes up and sees Santa has given him the guitar that he has wanted since childhood, but never got for Christmas because he was on the naughty list. He agrees to sell the guitar to pay off his debts but entertains the family by playing it first.

== Cast ==
- Josh Zuckerman as Danny Wrigley
- Brenda Grate as Kaitlin Wrigley, Danny's younger sister
- Jefferson Mappin as Santa Claus
- Rhys Williams as Peter Wrigley, Danny's younger brother
- Bryan Cranston as Nick Wrigley, Danny's paternal uncle
- Barclay Hope as John Wrigley, Danny's father
- Torri Higginson as Abby Wrigley, Danny's mother
- Jeff Geddis as Bill
- Sandy Robson as Harry
- Jung-Yul Kim as Eliot

== See also ==
- List of Christmas films
- Santa Claus in film
