= Bruce Coville's Shapeshifters =

1999 children's stories anthology

- First edition book cover
- Editor: Bruce Coville and Steve Roman
- Illustrator: John Nyberg
- Publisher: HarperCollins
- Publication date: October 6, 1999
- ISBN: 978-0-380-80255-5

Bruce Coville's Shapeshifters is a work of juvenile fiction. It is an anthology of short stories compiled and edited by Bruce Coville for Avon Camelot Books. It was first printed October 1999. Steve Roman is credited in the book as assisting in its creation. Bruce Coville's Alien Visitors and Bruce Coville's Strange Worlds are in the same series. These books are similar to Coville's anthologies for Scholastic Publishing, starting with Bruce Coville's Book of Monsters. Both series include stories by award-winning fantasy and science-fiction authors such as Jane Yolen and Ray Bradbury, as well as other supernatural and extraterrestrial stories from a broad range of other writers.

Bruce Coville's Shapeshifters includes fourteen stories about humans or other beings shapeshifting into animals, mythical creatures, and inanimate objects, as well as Bruce Coville's introduction, "What shape are your dreams?"

== Illustrations ==
The book includes fourteen black-and-white illustrations by Ernie Colon and John Nyberg. The cover of one Avon Camelot paperback printing, possibly the first, is by Ernie Colon. That cover features an alien/robot/human from surrounded by reptilian worms and silhouetted by an orange sky. It resembles comic book art rather than realistic art.

== Stories ==
1. "Homeward Bound," by Bruce Coville, is about a boy transforming into a unicorn and the following life and death struggle that ultimately results in an uplifting ending with an even more celestial transformation. Originally published in The Unicorn Treasury.
2. "I was a Best-selling Teenage Werewolf," by Lawrence Watt-Evans, is a comedic, satirical piece.
3. "Myself," by Mark Garland, is a suspenseful science-fiction piece.
4. "Frog Princes," by Janni Lee Simmer, is a lightly comedic fairy tale spoof about a young girl and a frog that turns into a prince.
5. "Tricky Coyote," by Susan J. Kroupa, is about a Hopi boy who must come to terms with his tough life at school as well as with his newfound power that comes from having the coyote as his animal guide.
6. "Swan Sister," by Anne Mazer, is a fairy tale about a young woman's determination to join her shapeshifting brothers in the sky as a swan. Originally published in A Sliver of Glass and other Uncommon Tales.
7. "The Changelings," by Jessica Amanda Salmonson, is based on Native American legend and follows a father trying to regain two of his children who have been adopted by the strange and terrifying Huluk. Originally published in Phantom Waters: Northwest Legends of Rivers, Lakes, and Shores.
8. "The Talking Sword," by Jack Dann, is a darkly humorous fantasy told by a sarcastic sword.
9. "Freedom," by Connie Wilkins is a wistful story which follows a young man who is confined to a wheel chair, a friendly, outgoing young women, and some mysterious stone wolves' heads on an old building.
10. "Fever Dream," by Ray Bradbury. An adolescent boy finds his body being taken over by an alien presence. Reprinted by permission of Don Congdon Associates, Inc.
11. "The Electronic Werewolf," by Lael Littke and Lori Littke Silfen, is about a boy who is infected with lycanthropy through a technology. It is somewhat comedic as well as somewhat scary, but does not involve any death.
12. "Wilding," by Jane Yolen, follows a group of teenagers in the future who find themselves in great danger when they visit a theme park in which, using advanced technology, they are able to transform themselves into the animal of their choice. (First printed in Michael Stearn's anthology A Starfarer's Dozen).
13. "Jonas, Just Jonas," by Nancy Varian Berberick and Greg LaBarbera is about a boy who can turn into a hawk and who is misunderstood by his neighbors and the larger society. It can be described as emotionally uplifting to a certain degree.
14. "A Million Copies in Print," by John C. Bunnell, is an unconventional story featuring a cat and a large number of cheap young adult/children's paperback books, but which actually details a supernatural, extraterrestrial conspiracy.
