= Space Brat =

Book series by Bruce Coville

Courtesy of Simon & Schuster Inc.

The Space Brat book series includes Space Brat, Space Brat 2: Blork's Evil Twin, Space Brat 3: The Wrath of Squat, Space Brat 4: Planet of the Dips, and Space Brat 5: The Saber-toothed Poodnoobie.

== Writing ==
According to comments from the author, Bruce Coville, the first Space Brat story version was written in 1977. He intended to make it a picture book, and his wife (Katherine Coville) even drew a few sample illustrations. The editor disagreed with this idea, however, saying he "didn't think kids would be interested in reading about a noseless green humanoid from outer space." Ironically, this was a few years before Steven Spielberg's movie E.T. was released.

== Plot ==
The series revolves around Blork, a young alien who lives on the planet Splat where children are hatched instead of born and remain quiet for three months until they eventually learn to get up and walk. In the case of Blork, a piece of his shell got stuck behind his ear resulting in him crying non-stop at the nursery where he was hatched. Because children on Splat are not expected to cry, one of the robots stuck a label on his forehead, categorizing him as a "Brat." Eventually the eggshell fell away, but having cried for so long Blork never got the same amount of sleep as the other children and was slightly crankier. Because he was categorized as a brat early on, many inhabitants of Splat came to expect him to be one and would always blame him for things that weren't necessarily his fault. Over time, the things he wasn't responsible for resulted in Blork getting punished. Eventually, the constant blame causes Blork to throw a tantrum. At school, the principal calls for the Head Man—someone who handles such situations. The Head Man suggests that rather than punish Blork, people should be more sympathetic to him in order to improve his development as a youth. Paired with the previous punishments, as well as not being punished in the future Blork decides to take advantage of this by actually pulling pranks. As Blork got worse, his tantrums got better. However, on one occasion where he was given a D grade in class—Blork attempted to throw a tantrum, which ultimately doesn't work.

The next day, Blork decides to take his pet poodnoobie Lunk to show and tell. When Blork was young, he had found Lunk by accident as he was an unhatched egg that took too long to hatch, resulting in Lunk's mother abandoning him when her other children hatched. Blork had taken this remaining egg, thinking it was bad, and threw it against a rock, resulting in tiny baby poodnoobie rolling out. At the time, it was so small it fit inside the palm of Blork's hand and feeling guilty, Blork decided to adopt it and name it Lunk. Poodnoobies resemble dogs, with the exception being that they have purple fur, three tongues and six legs. While poodnoobies are notorious for growing to giant proportions, the nursery rules allow Splatoon children to have one pet each as long as they care for it. Over time, Lunk grows into a giant pet. At school, Lunk gets distracted by a flying bug and ends up destroying the classroom by accident. This causes the teacher, Modra Ploogsik, to call the Big Pest Squad to take Lunk away where he will be vaporized like other troublesome animals. Feeling responsible for this, Blork decides to immediately run away during class and stowaway on the van carrying Lunk until they reach the Big Pest Squad compound. There, he steals a rocket car and manages to scoop up Lunk using the net function of the vehicle. Reunited, Blork decides to run away with Lunk to deep space. Due to not knowing his way, they end up landing in an unknown place that is inhabited by "Things" which resemble giant lizards.

Eventually, the two are brought before the leader of the Things, a short man calling himself Squat who decides to make both Blork and Lunk slaves. When Blork throws a tantrum, Squant is impressed and wants Blork to teach him how to throw one. Blork refuses, and both he and Lunk get imprisoned for some time. During the course of his imprisonment, Blork is subjected to various slave labor that include feeding creatures and cleaning the castle. At this time, he also slowly learns the language of the Things as well as their history of how Squat came to imprison their kind through the use of a vaporizing gun. Blork also learns how to control his emotions. Eventually, Blork is summoned to Squat again, who wants one of the Thing cooks to prepare Lunk as a meal. Blork is against this, and throws his biggest tantrum. Even more impressed than last time, Squat makes a deal with Blork that if he teaches him how to throw this tantrum he will allow both he and Lunk to go free. Blork agrees, and teaches Squat how to throw a big tantrum. Unfortunately, Squat reneges on the deal but that doesn't keep Blork and Lunk from attempting to leave. This causes Squat to throw the same tantrum that Blork taught. Blork is reminded of all the times he threw a tantrum, and decides enough is enough. He takes advantage of this to steal the gun that Squat left on the throne and tosses it to one of the Things, who promptly destroys is. Now powerless, Squat is lifted by one of the things and tossed out the window where he lands in the water of the moat below. He survives, but leaves.

Blork, Lunk, and all the Things throw a celebration that night but Blork realizes that despite all this he is homesick. The Things eventually help him pack for his journey home (including half of Squat's broken gun) and send him off on the rocket car that Blork had stolen earlier. On his way back, Blork realizes that they never left for deep space—they had actually went into the unexplored zone of the planet Splat. Upon arriving at his nursery, one of the Childkeeper robots is elated to see Blork return. Leaving Lunk home, both Blork and the Childkeeper pay a visit to Modra Ploogsik who is also glad to see Blork. Blork pleads his case with Modra Ploogsik to call off the Big Pest Squad, taking responsibility for his actions and volunteering to do a lot of work to make up for all the trouble he had caused. This unexpected apology causes Modra to faint and the Childkeeper to wonder if Blork is the same Blork that was in his care. Blork then proceeds to tell his story of what happened. Eventually, Blork does plead his case to the Big Pest Squad with a lot of apologies and patience with success, even returning the rocket car he had stolen. At the end of the story, Blork returns home and calls for Lunk—who excitedly races to him and licks his face with all three tongues.

Space Brat 2: Blork's Evil Twin

Blork and his classmates take a trip to a museum that showcases various Splatoonian inventions. The class troublemaker, Appus Meeko, hooks Blork's female crush to a machine that makes them large. Blork saves her, but cannot prove that Appus Meeko was responsible. While there, Blork accidentally finds his way into a forbidden room containing a seemingly harmless copying machine and decides to copy himself. While nothing happens, he returns home and discovers that he's getting blamed for several instances. Blork realizes that the copy machine created a mischievous clone of himself named Krolb and also realizes that it extracted all the negative qualities of Blork's personality and is running amok. In some cases, any action Blork does, Krolb does the opposite. Krolb also stole an experimental shrinking device and plans to use it on the entire city. Blork, aided by one of his classmates, Moomie Peevik—decide to go after Krolb and try to use reverse psychology to prevent Krolb from using the shrinking device. However, they are unsuccessful until Blork throws a tantrum, which ends up fusing him and Krolb back whole again. At Krolb's lair, they also encounter a creature that gets shrunk with the shrinking device, and it becomes Moomie Peevik's new pet. The story ends with the mayor of the city wanting to congratulate Blork by awarding him with a medal for saving the city. This also makes Appus Meeko jealous.

Space Brat 3: The Wrath of Squat

Before the ceremony to award Blork can happen, Squat returns in a large spaceship and abducts Blork, Lunk, Appus Meeko, along with Moomie Peevik and her pet and returns to a planet that he rules, in which the inhabitants are composed of nothing but angry people. When in captivity, they meet a strange scientist who works for Squat, but who also decides to help them escape. They manage to flee Squat's spider henchmen, eventually finding themselves in a city. Squat tracks them down, but Blork throws a huge tantrum which still proves to be better than Squat's and as a result the inhabitants want Blork to rule them instead. Blork declines, and instead decides to let Squat rule as his proxy. In the event that Squat is not doing his job, Blork says he will return—so the two agree that he will do his job without any issues. In exchange, Squat gives Blork his spaceship. Squat's former scientist also tags along, feeling that he never really fit with the planet and its inhabitants. As they prepare to head home, the scientist decided to experiment with the ship by connecting two different wires, causing the spaceship to malfunction.

Space Brat 4: Planet of the Dips

As a result of the malfunction, Blork and his friends end up traveling to the planet of the dips due to the presence of a stowaway named Skippy. There is a parody character based on Obi-Wan Kenobi who helps Blork find a way back home. Blork's pet Lunk, also gets confused with a ruler—and is not allowed to leave. This is due to a buried statue on the beach that resembles Lunk. Blork also participates in a contest to keep Lunk, involving throwing tomato-like fruits and trying to keep a sash clean. He loses, but is still permitted a request. He decides to use it to get all the inhabitants of the Dips to unearth the statue resembling Lunk and they discover it to be a Dip riding a Poodnoobie. One of the Dips happens to resemble one of the Dips, and they decide to make that Dip a ruler. With their ship repaired and ready to return home, they try to recreate the same steps they used and swap out Skippy's position with Appus Meeko. At the last moment, Moomie Peevik's pet ends up with Appus, causing the method to be disrupted.

Space Brat 5: The Saber-toothed Poodnoobie

Blork and his friends had attempted to return home using the same method that was used when Skippy was in the spaceship's closet. While they are successful in getting back to the planet Splat, they realize that they had time-traveled millions of years to Splat in the past. This was because of Moomie Peevik's pet, that had wandered into the closet. Appus Meeko was being used as a focal means to return home, and the pet interfered. Throughout the story, Blork meets a variety of prehistoric creatures and a Yoda-like character who advises him to not change the future by taking anything from the past with him. At the end of the book, Blork and his friends finally get back to Splat in their own time but find that they had missed the medal ceremony. When they return to their home, they find a statue that was created in their honor due to their prolonged absence. Two of their other acquaintances, remove the medal and rightfully place it around Blork. Blork decides instead to hang the medal inside their spaceship as a testament to everything he and his friends had gone through. At the end, they decide to go on another adventure. This time, everything goes right.

== Reviews ==
In its review of Space Brat 4: Planet of the Dips, School Library Journal stated that "Beginning readers with a passion for weird words, stupid jokes, and odd behavior will find happiness in this light and lively addition to the series."
