= Josh Zuckerman =

American actor (born 1985)

- Born: April 1, 1985 (age 41); Stanford, California, U.S.
- Education: Princeton University
- Occupation: Actor
- Years active: 1999–present
- Known for: Sex Drive
- Spouse: Andrea Bowen (m. 2024)
- Children: 1

Joshua Ryan Zuckerman (born April 1, 1985) is an American actor. He is best known for his starring role in Sex Drive (2008), as well as for playing Mark Brandt in the science fiction TV series Kyle XY, Eddie Orlofsky in Desperate Housewives and Nate Marlowe in the comedy series Significant Mother. He also had a recurring role as Max Miller in the CW drama 90210 and voiced the lead role of Pony in the Nickelodeon original animated series It's Pony. Since 2023, he has starred in the Paramount+ supernatural drama School Spirits.

== Early life ==
Zuckerman was born and raised in Stanford, California in a family of five children. He attended Bullis-Purisima Elementary School there. He began formally acting at the age of ten, with a series of roles at the nearby Bus Barn Theater with the Los Altos Youth Theater company. He moved to Los Angeles to pursue an acting career after finishing the seventh grade at Egan Junior High School, where he had been elected student body president. He is of Jewish descent.

He attended The Buckley School in Sherman Oaks. In 2003, he attended Princeton University, where he was a member of the Delta Kappa Epsilon fraternity, where he earned the pledge name "Checkers". After his freshman year he did not return to Princeton, deciding instead to focus on his acting career.

== Career ==
Zuckerman made his professional on-camera debut in 2000 opposite Julia Louis-Dreyfus and Drew Carey in the Disney Channel musical fantasy Geppetto, then enjoyed guest roles on the TV series NYPD Blue and Once and Again.

Zuckerman's assignments continued during his enrollment as a student at Princeton University, though over time he began to increasingly emphasize big-screen work, notably with supporting roles in the Ben Affleck, James Gandolfini holiday comedy Surviving Christmas (2004) and the Evan Rachel Wood dark comedy Pretty Persuasion (2005). In 2008, Zuckerman appeared in a multi-episode arc, as Mark, on the ABC Family series Kyle XY.

Later that year, Zuckerman signed for one of his first starring roles, as a teen who ventures out on a cross-country road trip, along with two friends, to meet a girl he has been chatting with online and lose his virginity to her, in the teen-oriented sex comedy-road movie Sex Drive.

He played Eddie Orlofsky on Desperate Housewives. Zuckerman had a recurring role in the CW series 90210 as Naomi's love interest, Max Miller.

== Personal life ==
As of August 29, 2024, Zuckerman is married to his former Desperate Housewives co-star Andrea Bowen.

== Filmography ==
=== Film ===
| Year | Title | Role | Notes |
|---|---|---|---|
| 2000 | Return to the Secret Garden | Timothie | |
| 2000 | The View from the Swing | Ben | Credited as Joshua Zuckerman |
| 2001 | The Myersons | Murphy Myerson | |
| 2002 | Lather. Rinse. Repeat | Timmy (little boy) | Short |
| 2002 | Austin Powers in Goldmember | Young Dr. Evil | |
| 2002 | I Was a Teenage Faust | Brendan | |
| 2004 | Surviving Christmas | Brian Valco | |
| 2005 | Pretty Persuasion | Josh Horowitz | |
| 2005 | Feast | Hot Wheels | |
| 2006 | The Hottest State | Decker | |
| 2007 | Lions for Lambs | Student | |
| 2008 | Sex Drive | Ian Lafferty | |
| 2009 | Ceremonies of the Horsemen | Zerach | Short |
| 2010 | Ivan's House | | Short |
| 2011 | 2ND Take | Ethan | |
| 2014 | Field of Lost Shoes | Moses Jacob Ezekiel | |
| 2014 | Acid Girls | Sebastian | |
| 2018 | Killing Diaz | Cam/Kira | |
| 2019 | Made Public | Dave | |
| 2019 | Ring Ring | Jason | |
| 2020 | Variant | Thomas | |
| 2020 | The Bellmen | Josh | |
| 2020 | Useless Humans | Brian | |
| 2023 | Oppenheimer | Giovanni Rossi Lomanitz | |
| 2024 | The Tiger's Apprentice | Rudy | Voice role |
| 2024 | Bau: Artist at War | Michael | |
| 2025 | For Worse | Jonah | |
| 2025 | C.O.G | Wes | previously titled as CognAItive |
| 2026 | Grizzly Night | Robert Klein | |

=== Television ===
| Year | Title | Role | Notes |
|---|---|---|---|
| 2000 | Get Real | Young Andy | Episode: "The Distance" |
| 2000 | Once and Again | Toby Porter | Episodes: "Sneaky Feelings" and "Cat-in-Hat" |
| 2000 | Geppetto | Featured | |
| 2000 | That's Life | Eric Feinstein | Episode: "The Tutor" |
| 2000 | The Amanda Show | | Episode: "Mammal-O's" |
| 2001 | Bette | Tim | Episode: "The Invisible Mom" |
| 2001 | Jack & Jill | Adam Fickman | Episode: "Battle of the Bahamas" |
| 2001 | The West Wing | Boy #1 – Billy Fernandez | Episode: "Isaac and Ishmael" |
| 2001 | The Ellen Show | Timmy | Episode: "Cathy's Taffy" |
| 2001 | The Nightmare Room | Jeremy Clark | Episode: "Four Eyes" |
| 2001 | 'Twas the Night | Danny Wrigley | TV movie |
| 2001 | Judging Amy | Rob Bird | Episode: "Beating the Bounds" |
| 2002 | NYPD Blue | James 'Swirly' Kilik | Episodes: "Oh, Mama!" and "A Little Dad'll Do Ya" |
| 2002 | I Was a Teenage Faust | Brendan Willy | TV movie |
| 2005 | House | Keen Student | Episode: "Three Stories" |
| 2006 | Standoff | Cary Steckler | Episode: "Peer Group" |
| 2007 | Close to Home | Ben Murphy | Episode: "Maternal Instinct" |
| 2007 | CSI: Miami | Leo Donwell | Episodes: "Internal Affairs", "Broken Home" and "Bloodline" |
| 2007 | Boston Legal | Michael Scanlon | Episode: "Trial of the Century" |
| 2008–2009 | Kyle XY | Mark Brandt | 13 episodes |
| 2009–2010 | Desperate Housewives | Eddie Orlofsky | 12 episodes |
| 2010–2013 | 90210 | Max Miller | 33 episodes |
| 2011 | Mr. Sunshine | Jimmy Lincon | Episode: "Lingerie Football" |
| 2011 | The Protector | Josh Taylor | Episode: "Wings" |
| 2012 | Breakout Kings | Rodney Cain | Episode: "Ain't Love (50) Grand?" |
| 2014 | Betas | Lance Roe | Episode: "This Is It" |
| 2015 | Significant Mother | Nate Marlowe | Lead role |
| 2016 | The Big Bang Theory | Marty | Episode: "The Military Miniaturization" |
| 2016 | Rosewood | Cody Tucker | Episode: "Boatspy & Booty" |
| 2017 | There's... Johnny! | Justin | Episode: "Take Me to Church" |
| 2017 | Ride Overshare | Michael | Episode: "Natalie" |
| 2018 | Strange Angel | Marvin Nickels | Episodes: "Sacrament of the Ancestors" and "The Sacrificial Dance" |
| 2020–2022 | It's Pony | Pony | Voice role |
| 2022 | The Offer | Peter Bart | Miniseries, main role |
| 2023–present | School Spirits | Mr. Martin | Recurring (season 1); main role (season 2) |
| 2023 | Fatal Attraction | Paul | Episodes: "The Watchful Heart" and "Beautiful Mosaics" |
| 2024 | Chicago Med | Bill Storch | Episodes: "Get By With A Little Help From My Friends" |
| 2024 | S.W.A.T. | Cameron | Episodes: "Good for Nothing" |
