= I Left My Sneakers in Dimension X =

1994 novel by Bruce Coville

- Author: Bruce Coville
- Language: English
- Series: Rod Allbright's Alien Adventures
- Genre: Sci-fi
- Publisher: Aladdin
- Publication date: 1994
- Publication place: United States
- Preceded by: Aliens Ate My Homework
- Followed by: The Search For Snout

I Left My Sneakers in Dimension X is the second book in the children's science fiction series Rod Allbright's Alien Adventures. The series was written by Bruce Coville. I Left My Sneakers in Dimension X was first published in 1994.

== Plot summary ==
I Left My Sneakers in Dimension X continues the adventures of Rod and the crew of the Galactic Patrol ship Ferkel. When villainous BKR's friend Smorkus Flinders crosses over from Dimension X, he captures Rod and his bratty cousin Elspeth, taking them back to his home to use as bait for the crew of the Ferkel as revenge for them imprisoning BKR. Rod and Elspeth are rescued by Captain Grakker and his crew, but during the escape from Castle Chaos, the Ferkel is damaged enough that all must abandon ship. Without their spacecraft, our heroes are stranded.

Following the strange disappearance of their friend Snout, the seven remaining gain help in the form of Galuspa, one of the race of Shapeshifters that are native to Dimension X. With his help, they are taken to the Valley of the Shapeshifters to see the Ting Wongovia. During their journey, Rod gains a new companion: a furry little creature called a Chibling, which bonds to him. Also during this time, and the time spent waiting in the Valley, Rod sees that another of the crew, Tar Gibbons, is watching him. Later, Tar asks Rod to become his "Krevlik", or apprentice. Rod accepts, and begins training under his new teacher in the ways of martial arts. During the wait, Rod learns that BKR was handed off to the Merkel, one of the Ferkel's sister ships, to be delivered to prison, and that the crew of the Ferkel readily jumped in to save them despite knowledge that they were headed into a trap.

Finally, the Ting Wongovia agrees to see them. They find out that he is actually the egg brother of their missing comrade Snout, and that Smorkus Flinders was once a good person, but, when he was slightly older than Rod, he was caught in a horrific Reality Quake that permanently transformed him into a monster. Banished to the Valley of the Monsters, he became their king, but the Reality Quake's effects also drove him partially insane. They then learn the plans of Smorkus Flinders and BKR: they intend to create a permanent hole between Dimension X, home of the dangerous Reality Quakes, and Dimension Q, home of the planet Earth and the Galactic Patrol. This would cause the Reality Quakes to leak over to our world, and the two dimensions would eventually fuse into a single dimension where reality can shift like sand; Smorkus Flinders sees this plan as an opportunity to get revenge on life for what it did to him, while the sadistic BKR simply wants to make others suffer, even with the knowledge that the Reality Quakes will affect him just as much as anyone else. To stop him, the crew of the Ferkel are joined by the Shapeshifters, the Ting Wongovia, and (to their dismay) Elspeth. Returning to Castle Chaos (in part with help from Spar Kellis, a gigantic blue monster who works for the Ting Wongovia by spying on Smorkus Flinders), they make their stand.

In the resulting confrontation, Rod is forced to grow to a gigantic height so he can defeat Smorkus Flinders. During the battle, he is contacted by Snout (by way of a direct telepathic link between the two), and learns that his old friend is being held captive by the "Ferkada". He also finds that Smorkus Flinders knows something about Rod's father. When Rod himself questions the monster, Smorkus Flinders cries out to ask BKR. About then, Rod blacks out. Soon after he wakes up, Rod learns that Smorkus Flinders is now their captive, and that when the Ferkel crashed into his room, they were really looking for another alien... his own father.

With these revelations on his mind, Rod prepares to go home. But first, he winds up giving his new sneakers to Spar Kellis as a gift. But with all that has happened, telling his mother that he left his sneakers in Dimension X is the least of his worries.

== Other books in the series ==
- Aliens Ate My Homework
- The Search for Snout (UK title: Aliens Stole My Dad)
- Aliens Stole My Body
