= Universal Pictures Home Entertainment =

American home video distribution unit of Universal Pictures

Universal Pictures Home Entertainment LLC
- Formerly: List: MCA Videocassette, Inc. (1980–1983); MCA Videodisc, Inc. (1981–1983); MCA Home Video (1983–1990); MCA/Universal Home Video (1990–1997); Universal Studios Home Video LLC (1997–2005); Universal Studios Home Entertainment LLC (2005–2016)
- Type: Division
- Industry: Home video
- Predecessors: List: MCA DiscoVision (1978–1981); CIC Video (1980–1999); NBC Home Entertainment (1981–2004); PolyGram Video (1982–1999); USA Home Entertainment (1999–2002); DreamWorks Animation Home Entertainment (2006–2018); Golden Book Video (1985–1996); Right Entertainment (2001–2009)
- Founded: 1980; 46 years ago, in Los Angeles, California, U.S.
- Headquarters: Universal City, California, United States
- Area served: Worldwide
- Products: Home video
- Parent: Universal Pictures
- Divisions: Universal 1440 Entertainment; Universal Playback
- Subsidiaries: Studio Distribution Services (joint venture with Warner Bros. Home Entertainment) (2021–2026)
- Website: universalpicturesathome.com

Universal Pictures Home Entertainment LLC (UPHE, formerly known as Universal Studios Home Video LLC (USHV) from 1997 until 2005 and Universal Studios Home Entertainment LLC (USHE) from 2005 until 2016) is an American home video distribution unit of Universal Pictures, an American film studio owned by Comcast (through NBCUniversal). The unit was founded in 1980.

Universal Pictures Home Entertainment is the home video distributor of all of the Universal Pictures film library, all of the Focus Features film library, most of the 1929–1949 Paramount Pictures film library held by EMKA, Ltd., and all of the shows of the NBCUniversal Syndication Studios library (NBC and Bravo).

The division also had distribution deals with United Artists Releasing (including select Metro-Goldwyn-Mayer and Orion Pictures films), The Film Arcade, Aviron Pictures, STX Entertainment (excluding all of the films from EuropaCorp Films USA, which Lionsgate holds the home video distribution rights to), Mattel Television (for the longest-running Barbie direct-to-video film series), 101 Studios, Sovereign Films, Open Road Films, Briarcliff Entertainment, Pinnacle Peak Pictures, Picturehouse, Blumhouse Tilt, Neon and Bleecker Street (until 2021), Funimation (in the United States and Canada; until 2018, after which Sony Pictures Home Entertainment took over) and Entertainment One (in the United Kingdom, Canada, Australia, Spain, Germany and the United States; until 2024, after which Lionsgate Home Entertainment took over).

Starting in 2021, their releases are currently distributed in the United States by Studio Distribution Services, originally a joint venture between Universal Pictures Home Entertainment and Warner Bros. Home Entertainment which was acquired by Conectiv Supply Chain Solutions (formerly owned by Vantiva) on August 4, 2026. Select titles are also distributed by Allied Vaughn through its Manufacture-on-demand (MOD) solutions.

== History ==
The company was founded in 1980 as MCA Videocassette, Inc. with Gene Giaquinto as president of the division. It released 24 films on Betamax and VHS in May 1980, including Jaws, Animal House and The Deer Hunter as well as classic films such as Dracula, Animal Crackers, and Scarface. Jaws 2 and 1941 were also released that year. Before 1980 Castle Films (known as Universal 8 after 1977) had served as Universal's home film distribution unit. In late 1983, both the LaserDisc sister label MCA Videodisc and the MCA Videocassette label were consolidated into a single entity, MCA Home Video, alternating with the MCA Videocassette, Inc. name until December 1983.

By the mid-1980s, MCA Home Video began to license catalog titles to smaller, independent video firms with a focus on sell-through product. The first was in 1986 with Kartes Video Communications. The deal was followed with a similar agreement with GoodTimes Home Video in 1987.

In 1986, the company made agreements with Motown Productions and with children's book publisher Price Stern Sloan. Both deals were intended to expand MCA's non-theatrical product, 1987 was a busy year for MCA Home Video; the company underwent an executive shuffle, signed an exclusive three-year deal with International Video Entertainment for video distribution, and began offering new content from Ringling Bros. and Barnum and Bailey Circus.

In 1990, with the 75th anniversary of Universal Studios, MCA Home Video became MCA/Universal Home Video and used that name alternating with the MCA Home Video name from 1990 until 1997. On December 9, 1996, the company was renamed Universal Studios Home Video when MCA was reincorporated as Universal Studios, which would then later be part of Vivendi Universal Entertainment in 2000.

Universal's first titles on DVD releases in 1997 were licensed to Image Entertainment for distribution. Those early bare-bones editions quickly fell out-of-print when Universal started making their own DVD releases.

When Universal's then-parent company (Seagram) purchased PolyGram Filmed Entertainment in 1998, Universal gained not only the Post-March 1996 PolyGram library, but also a brand new genre for Universal, in a form of Stand-up comedy from the likes of Roy Chubby Brown, Jethro, Jim Davidson, Billy Connolly and Lee Evans, Universal additionally gained distribution rights to some classic British television content as well, such as the Smallfilms library, The Vicar Of Dibley, Fun Song Factory and the then-upcoming Lock, Stock... television series, just to name quite a few, as well as the UK home video rights to Barney & Friends (until 2001, when HIT Entertainment purchased Lyrick Studios, after which, HIT immediately started self-releasing Barney titles).

In March 2001 when French media congolomate Vivendi had acquired Universal Studios Home Video's parent Universal Studios and its owner Seagram, Universal Studios established a new subsidiary that would handle, manage and expand Universal Pictures' key intellectual properties across multiple platforms entitled Universal Pictures Franchise Development with Universal Pictures Home Video including its animation production division Universal Cartoon Studios & London-based British production division Universal Pictures Visual Programming being placed into the new subsidiary alongside Universal Studios' consumer products & licensing division Universal Pictures Consumer Products which also became division of the new subsidiary while Louis Feola became president of the new subsidiary.

In 2004, due to the merger of Universal Studios and NBC to form NBCUniversal, Universal started releasing Universal DVD releases of shows from the newly established NBCUniversal Television Distribution. Before 2004, NBC shows were distributed on VHS and DVD by Lions Gate Home Entertainment, A&E Home Video, and other distributors under the label NBC Home Entertainment (formerly NBC Home Video under Trimark until it was bought by Lions Gate). NBC's home entertainment on-screen logo was simply the NBC Enterprises syndication logo.

In March 2005 (by which point Universal Studios Home Video was renamed to Universal Studios Home Entertainment), the group was restructured; Universal 1440 Entertainment was formed as an internal production arm, while the London-based Universal Pictures Visual Programming (formerly PolyGram Visual Programming) unit was folded into Universal Pictures International; Universal Cartoon Studios was absorbed into the Family Productions unit. The year after, UPHE acquired distribution rights to the Barbie film series after negotiations between Mattel and their previous domestic distributor, Lionsgate Home Entertainment, fell through (Universal had already been distributing these films internationally).

Universal Pictures Home Entertainment was also the worldwide home video distributor for DreamWorks Pictures titles (through DreamWorks Home Entertainment) until 2006, when DreamWorks Pictures was sold to Paramount Pictures' parent company, Viacom, and as a result, Paramount Home Entertainment took over distribution. After Viacom spun-off DreamWorks Pictures in 2008, Universal Studios Home Entertainment planned resuming distributing DreamWorks Pictures' movies, but this deal fell through. Until Lionsgate formed their home video division, Universal distributed their releases with the exception of Dogma, which was distributed by Columbia TriStar Home Video. In 2007, it was signed on as home video distributor of releases by Summit Entertainment (ironically, Summit was later bought by Lionsgate).

In addition to Universal DVD releases, Universal was a major supporter of the HD DVD format until Toshiba discontinued the format. Starting on July 22, 2008, Universal Pictures Home Entertainment has released Blu-ray Discs, and it was the last main major Hollywood movie studio to do it so. The first three Blu-ray Disc releases to release in the United States were The Mummy, its sequel The Mummy Returns, and The Scorpion King. Starting on August 9, 2016, Universal Pictures Home Entertainment has released 4K Ultra HD Blu-rays.

In September 2013, Universal Pictures' digital distribution division was merged into Universal Studios Home Entertainment as the combined entity under the Universal Studios Home Entertainment name would oversume all home entertainment distribution of NBCUniversal's film and television content, Michael Bonner continued leading the domestic digital distribution team, overseeing domestic distribution for film and television across all platforms under Universal Studios Home Entertainment.

In 2014, Universal Studios Home Entertainment took over releasing HIT Entertainment/Mattel titles from Lionsgate Home Entertainment (this would end in 2020, although Universal Studios Home Entertainment continues to distribute the Barbie direct-to-video titles for Mattel).

In 2015, Funimation (now known as Crunchyroll, LLC), formed a multi-year home video distribution deal with UPHE. Two years later, Sony Pictures Television acquired a 95% stake in Funimation, which resulted in Sony Pictures Home Entertainment taking over distribution after the UPHE deal expired.

In 2016, Universal Studios Home Entertainment was renamed to Universal Pictures Home Entertainment.

Starting on June 5, 2018, because Comcast (through NBCUniversal) acquired DreamWorks Animation in 2016, Universal Pictures Home Entertainment re-distributed all of DreamWorks Animation's back catalogue film library on home video after DreamWorks Animation's previous home video distribution deal with 20th Century Fox Home Entertainment (through DreamWorks Animation Home Entertainment) expired, resulting in DreamWorks Animation Home Entertainment being folded into Universal Pictures Home Entertainment.

== Internationally ==
=== Distribution deals ===
Outside North America, before 1999, Universal releases were distributed by CIC Video, their international home video joint-venture with Paramount Pictures. When Universal nearly pulled out of UIP in 1999 following their then-parent Seagram's purchase of PolyGram, they would pull out of CIC and renamed PolyGram's home video unit (PolyGram Video) as Universal Pictures Video.

In the Netherlands, UPHE distributed most DVDs of films released theatrically by Independent Films and TV shows and films from Studio 100 until 2006, although this is now limited to catalog releases, as more recent films are now released through Warner Home Video and later on, Belga Home Video.

In South Africa, UPHE distributes films on DVD and VHS through CIC Video in the 1980s and 1990s. In 1999, the company was moved to Ster-Kinekor Home Entertainment after CIC Video was dissolved in the same year. In 2007, it was moved later to Nu Metro Home Entertainment on DVDs and Blu-Ray discs until 2013, when Next Entertainment took over until at least 2019.

UPHE also formerly distributed StudioCanal titles on home media in France (until 2024 when distribution moved to ESC Distribution), most of the Republic Pictures library in the UK and most of the Carolco Pictures library in Australia, Latin America, and several European countries (along with other StudioCanal properties) until StudioCanal's global distribution deal with Universal expired in January 2022. In the 1980s until the late 1990s, they also distributed tapes released by Cineplex Odeon in Canada.

In the UK, UPHE previously distributed its films on video internationally through CIC Video (a division of Cinema International Corporation, later United International Pictures) alongside Paramount Pictures. In Japan, releases from both Universal and Paramount appeared on CIC-Victor Video, Ltd. (a joint venture between CIC Video and JVC) for VHS and on Pioneer LDC, Inc. for Laserdisc.

On February 28, 1999, Universal signed a multi-year distribution deal with Columbia-TriStar Home Video to allow the latter to distribute Universal's DVD releases outside North America (though the deal doesn't include any DreamWorks Home Entertainment titles, nor any British TV content, nor any stand-up comedy titles). This deal would last until 2002, when Universal started self-releasing all their DVDs.

In June 2002, Columbia-TriStar Home Entertainment formed a joint-venture with Universal Pictures (UK) Ltd called UCA (Universal Columbia Alliance), under which Universal would distribute back catalogue Columbia Tristar titles through retail.

UPHE's international operations are a carryover from the PolyGram Video days, but UPHE operates a joint venture in Australia, New Zealand and Scandinavia with Sony Pictures Home Entertainment called Universal Sony Pictures Home Entertainment. The venture distributes UPHE and SPHE titles on home media in those countries and also licensed anime series and films from the anime library of NBCUniversal Entertainment Japan, the Japanese division of UPHE's sister company, Universal Pictures International Entertainment, formerly known as Pioneer LDC from 1981 to 2003, Geneon Entertainment from 2003 to 2009 and Geneon Universal Entertainment from 2009 to very late 2013, the year they switched to their current name. The name of the joint venture is Universal Sony Pictures Home Entertainment Australia. Before that, though, NBCUniversal Entertainment Japan had a marketing and distribution division in North America called Geneon USA, which, like UPHE, also distributed home video. At the time, NBCUEJ was known as Geneon Entertainment. Geneon USA shut down in late 2007, and Universal has licensed all of NBCUniversal Entertainment Japan's catalog to other companies rather than directly distributing them themselves. Starting on March 26, 2022, NBCUEJ (through UPHE) distributes and licenses anime series and films.

From 2017 to 2018, Funimation began directly distributing a select number of its titles in Australia and New Zealand through Universal Sony Pictures Home Entertainment Australia. In September 2018, Funimation transferred distribution to Madman Entertainment, with Madman handling distribution and classification within the region.

On October 3, 2014, Universal established global headquarters for its home video division in Los Angeles.

At the start of 2015, Paramount Home Entertainment signed a distribution agreement with Universal, whereby the latter will distribute the former's titles overseas, particularly in the territories where Paramount holds an office. The deal began on July 1, 2015.

The Universal deal expired upon the announcement of the Universal/Warner Bros. physical media joint-venture, and as a result, Paramount signed a new UK home entertainment distribution deal with StudioCanal UK and Lionsgate UK's Elevation Sales on July 14, 2020, that began in November that year.

Along with the announcement of the Universal/Warner Bros. NA physical home media joint-venture, Universal announced that they would begin distributing Warner Bros. titles in Germany, Austria, Switzerland and Japan (until 2025) in the third quarter of 2020 through home video, while Warner Bros. announced that they would begin distributing Universal titles in the United Kingdom (until 2025), Italy (until 2024), Belgium, the Netherlands and Luxembourg in the first quarter of 2021 through home video.

In 2020, SF Studios had signed a distribution deal with Universal to handle titles across the Nordic region.

In late 2023 and late 2024 respectively, Plaion Pictures and Spirit Entertainment signed a distribution deal with Universal to handle titles respectively in Italy and the United Kingdom, which caused Universal's deal with Warner Bros. Home Entertainment to expire in those countries. As for Plaion, they expanded to distribute Universal's titles in Germany, Austria and Switzerland as of January 1, 2026. Since early 2024, ESC Distribution now handles Universal's titles on home media in France.

== Universal 1440 Entertainment ==
Universal 1440 Entertainment
- Logo used since 2012
- Formerly: Universal Studios Family Productions (2005–2012)
- Type: Division
- Industry: Direct-to-video
- Predecessor: MCA Family Entertainment (1990–1996)
- Founded: 2005; 21 years ago in Los Angeles, California
- Headquarters: Universal City, California, United States
- Area served: United States; Worldwide
- Key people: Patti Jackson (SVP, Live action production)
- Parent: Universal Pictures Home Entertainment
- Divisions: Universal Animation Studios

Universal 1440 Entertainment is the direct-to-video entertainment label of Universal Pictures Home Entertainment created in 2005. The entity is a successor to MCA Family Entertainment (formerly Universal Family Entertainment).

It was originally known as Universal Studios Family Productions, and Universal Animation Studios (formerly Universal Cartoon Studios) is a subsidiary of the company.

=== Filmography ===
| Year | Title | Co-production with |
|---|---|---|
| January 10, 2012 | The Scorpion King 3: Battle for Redemption | |
| October 9, 2012 | Werewolf: The Beast Among Us | |
| January 22, 2013 | Death Race 3: Inferno | |
| September 24, 2013 | Curse of Chucky | |
| October 22, 2013 | Dead in Tombstone | |
| April 1, 2014 | The Little Rascals Save the Day | |
| August 19, 2014 | Jarhead 2: Field of Fire | |
| September 2, 2014 | Mostly Ghostly: Have You Met My Ghoulfriend? | |
| October 28, 2014 | Beethoven's Treasure Tail | |
| January 13, 2015 | The Scorpion King 4: Quest for Power | |
| April 14, 2015 | The Man with the Iron Fists 2 | |
| June 23, 2015 | Curious George 3: Back to the Jungle | Universal Animation Studios |
| September 18, 2015 | The Martial Arts Kid | |
| September 29, 2015 | Monsterville: Cabinet of Souls | |
| October 6, 2015 | Tremors 5: Bloodlines | |
| February 2, 2016 | The Land Before Time XIV: Journey of the Brave | Universal Animation Studios |
| May 17, 2016 | Kindergarten Cop 2 | |
| June 7, 2016 | Jarhead 3: The Siege | |
| September 6, 2016 | Honey 3: Dare to Dance | |
| September 6, 2016 | Hard Target 2 | |
| September 6, 2016 | Mostly Ghostly: One Night in Doom House | |
| January 17, 2017 | Death Race 2050 | |
| April 18, 2017 | Bigger Fatter Liar | |
| June 13, 2017 | Dragonheart: Battle for the Heartfire | |
| August 1, 2017 | Cop and a Half: New Recruit | |
| August 29, 2017 | Bring It On: Worldwide Cheersmack | |
| September 12, 2017 | Dead Again in Tombstone | |
| October 3, 2017 | Cult of Chucky | |
| November 14, 2017 | All I Want for Christmas Is You | |
| February 6, 2018 | Woody Woodpecker | Universal Animation Studios |
| March 6, 2018 | Aliens Ate My Homework | |
| April 3, 2018 | Honey: Rise Up and Dance | |
| May 1, 2018 | Tremors: A Cold Day in Hell | |
| October 2, 2018 | Death Race: Beyond Anarchy | |
| October 2, 2018 | Tales from the Hood 2 | |
| October 23, 2018 | Scorpion King: Book of Souls | |
| December 11, 2018 | Unbroken: Path to Redemption | |
| January 8, 2019 | The Car: Road to Revenge | |
| January 29, 2019 | Benchwarmers 2: Breaking Balls | Revolution Studios |
| February 5, 2019 | Grand-Daddy Day Care | Revolution Studios |
| April 20, 2019 | How High 2 | Smith-Garr Productions; Capital Arts Entertainment |
| May 14, 2019 | Backdraft 2 | Imagine Entertainment |
| September 10, 2019 | Curious George: Royal Monkey | Universal Animation Studios |
| September 24, 2019 | Inside Man: Most Wanted | Imagine Entertainment |
| October 1, 2019 | Doom: Annihilation | |
| October 1, 2019 | Jarhead: Law of Return | |
| November 5, 2019 | Undercover Brother 2 | |
| January 7, 2020 | Bulletproof 2 | |
| February 4, 2020 | Dragonheart: Vengeance | |
| August 4, 2020 | Aliens Stole My Body | |
| September 8, 2020 | Curious George: Go West, Go Wild | Universal Animation Studios |
| September 13, 2020 | Wish Upon a Unicorn | |
| September 29, 2020 | Welcome to Sudden Death | |
| October 6, 2020 | American Pie Presents: Girls' Rules | |
| October 6, 2020 | Tales from the Hood 3 | |
| October 20, 2020 | Tremors: Shrieker Island | |
| December 8, 2020 | Bobbleheads: The Movie | Threshold Entertainment; Universal Animation Studios |
| April 12, 2021 | Dinosaur Train: Adventure Island | The Jim Henson Company; PBS Kids |
| September 30, 2021 | Curious George: Cape Ahoy | Universal Animation Studios |
| September 27, 2022 | The Munsters | Spookshow International Films |
| September 27, 2022 | Bring It On: Cheer or Die | Beacon Pictures |
| October 25, 2022 | Blade of the 47 Ronin | Scrappy Heart Productions |
| November 15, 2022 | R.I.P.D. 2: Rise of the Damned | Dark Horse Entertainment |
| November 22, 2022 | Prancer: A Christmas Tale | |
| July 20, 2023 | Ready Jet Go!: Space Camp | Wind Dancer Films; Silver Creek Falls Entertainment |
| August 1, 2023 | River Wild | Hero Squared Productions |
| April 12, 2024 | Woody Woodpecker Goes to Camp | Netflix; Universal Animation Studios |
| April 16, 2024 | Half Baked: Totally High | STX Entertainment |
| August 1, 2026 | Soulm8te | Atomic Monster; Blumhouse Productions |
| September 15, 2026 | The Last Kiss | Blumhouse Atomic Monster; Man in a Tree |

== Universal Playback ==
Universal Playback is a division of Universal Pictures Home Entertainment and specializing in DVD and Blu-ray releases of TV shows, either it be produced or distributed by Universal Pictures. It offers a variety of titles across different TV genres, including TV shows, documentaries, and special interest content.
