= The Miracle Season =

2018 American film directed by Sean McNamara

- Theatrical release poster
- Directed by: Sean McNamara
- Screenplay by: David Aaron Cohen; Elissa Matsueda
- Story by: David Aaron Cohen
- Produced by: Mickey Liddell; Pete Shilaimon; Scott Holroyd; Mark Ciardi
- Starring: Erin Moriarty; Helen Hunt; William Hurt; Danika Yarosh
- Cinematography: Brian Pearson
- Edited by: Jeff Canavan
- Music by: Roque Baños
- Production company: LD Entertainment
- Distributed by: LD Entertainment; Mirror Releasing
- Release dates: March 18, 2018 (Englert Theatre); April 6, 2018 (United States)
- Running time: 99 minutes
- Country: United States
- Language: English
- Box office: $10.2 million

The Miracle Season is a 2018 American biographical sports drama film directed by Sean McNamara and starring Erin Moriarty, Helen Hunt, William Hurt, and Danika Yarosh. The film is based on the true story of the Iowa City West High School volleyball team after the sudden death of the team's heart and leader, Caroline Found, in 2011. It was released in the United States on April 6, 2018. The film received mixed reviews from critics and has grossed $10 million worldwide.

== Plot ==
Caroline "Line" Found is the star volleyball player on the Iowa City West High School volleyball team and well-loved by members of the community. With Line as the captain, the Trojans have been undefeated and everyone in the city has high hopes for them to win the championship against their long-time rival, City High. During a party at her house, Line sneaks off to visit her mother Ellyn, who is being treated for cancer in a hospital. Line is killed in a moped accident, leaving the entire community in mourning. At Line's wake, Ellyn insists on walking to her daughter's casket to pay her respects; Ellyn dies from cancer days after the wake, leaving her husband and Line's father Ernie grieving over the loss of his wife and his daughter.

The Trojans' coach, Kathy "Brez" Bresnahan, continues to hold volleyball practice. She asks Line's best friend, Kelley Fliehler, to return to the team, saying Line would have wanted them to continue. Kelley initially refuses, but Brez persuades her. The Trojans forfeited their most recent match and Kelley encourages the entire school to continue for Line.

West High struggles in practice and loses their first game badly, still discouraged by Line's death. Brez runs the team through grueling drills and names Kelley the new captain. Kelley initially struggles in the role, but improves as the weeks go by. The team begins to win and is motivated to win the state championship for Line. They need to win the fourteen remaining games to be eligible for the state championship, which they do.

Before the tournament begins, Kelley receives a gift from Line's father, that encourages her not just to play for Line, but to "Live Like Line". At West High, Kelley and boyfriend Alex paint the windows to read "Live Like Line". T-shirts with the catchphrase are given out to players, staff, and fans. The Trojans win the quarter-final game with ease, but struggle to win their semi-final game. They move on to the championship against City High, who are heavily favored to win. Before the game, Brez gives a tribute to Line, deciding not to have a moment of silence, but encourages the crowd to meet someone new, as Line always was kind to everyone. City takes the lead early, but West ties the score and forces the fifth and final set, which the Trojans win. As the crowd cheers, "Sweet Caroline" plays in honor of Line and Kelley holds Line's picture up high and proud.

During the closing credits, images, videos, and footage show the real life Caroline Found and her family, Kelley Fliehler, Kathy Bresnahan, and the Iowa West High volleyball team. On-screen subtitles show how Caroline Found's death inspired the real Iowa West High volleyball team to repeat their win for the 2011 Iowa State Championship. The Founds climbed Mount Monadnock. Over 4,000 students from across Iowa attended Line's funeral. Kathy "Brez" Bresnahan was voted National Coach of the Year for 2011; she retired from coaching in 2014 but remains in contact with the 2011 team. Scott Sanders would replace Bresnahan as the West High coach, while Kelley Fliehler went on to study microbiology at Iowa State University. Ernie was given a white rose at senior night to honor Caroline Found. A bench in downtown Iowa City was painted in honor of Line and her mother Ellyn.

== Cast ==
- Erin Moriarty as Kelley Fliehler, Caroline's best friend who becomes the new volleyball team captain after Caroline dies
  - Ava Grace Cooper as Little Kelley
- Danika Yarosh as Caroline "Line" Found, star player of the Iowa City West High School volleyball team who dies in a moped accident
  - Bailey Skodje as Little Line
- Helen Hunt as Kathy Bresnahan, volleyball coach
- Jason Gray-Stanford as Scott Sanders, assistant volleyball coach
- Jillian Fargey as Ellyn Found, Caroline's sick mother
- William Hurt as Dr. Ernie Found, Caroline's father and Ellyn's husband
- Garry Chalk as Principal Shaw
- Tiera Skovbye as Brie Tipton, West High Volleyball Player #8
- Nesta Cooper as Lizzy Ackerman, West High Volleyball Player #18
- Lillian Douchet-Roche as Taylor Mitchell, West High Volleyball Player #14
- Natalie Sharp as Mackenzie "Mack" Davidson, West High Volleyball Player #11
- Rebecca Merastry as Volleyball Player #1 for West High
- Emma Barlow as Volleyball Player #17 for West High
- Burkely Duffield as Alex, Kelley's boyfriend
- Rebecca Staab as Bethany Fliehler, Kelley's mother

The movie also had real-life former volleyball players as extras. Vanessa Wiebe and Cassandra Bagnell, who previously played for Thompson Rivers University and Dalhousie University respectively portray Twin Towers 1 & 2, City High School volleyball teammates who rival West High. Jessica Bailey, who was a volleyball player for Trinity Western University, portrays herself as one of the West High Volleyball players. Alexis Jonker, Katelyn Devaney, and Rowyn Neufeld, also from Trinity Western University portray other volleyball players from rival schools West High faces. Olivia Cesaretti of Douglas College, Brianna Solberg and Taeya Page of University of Calgary, Emma Barlow of University of Guelph, as well as Samantha Patko of University of British Columbia portray additional West High Volleyball players. The film's director, Sean McNamara, makes a cameo as a Caroline Found fan, while Helen Hunt's real-life daughter, Makena Lei Gordon Carnahan, portrays a high schooler named Ruby.

== Production ==
The film was originally titled Live Like Line. William Hurt and Helen Hunt joined the film in June 2016; Hunt and McNamara previously worked together on the similarly-themed film Soul Surfer. Filming took place in Vancouver, Canada.

== Release ==
The Miracle Season premiered at the Englert Theatre in Iowa City, where the film is set, on March 18, 2018. It was released by LD Entertainment on April 6, 2018.

=== Home media ===
The film was released on DVD and Digital by 20th Century Fox Home Entertainment on July 31, 2018.

=== Box office ===
In the United States and Canada, The Miracle Season was released alongside A Quiet Place, Chappaquiddick and Blockers, and as projected to gross around $3 million from 1,707 theaters in its opening weekend. It ended up debuting to $4.1 million, finishing 11th; 74% of its audience was female.

=== Critical response ===
On review aggregator Rotten Tomatoes, the film has an approval rating of 53% based on 45 reviews, and an average rating of 5.7/10. The website's critical consensus reads, "The Miracle Season has a worthy real-life story to tell, but one-dimensional characters and aggressively maudlin storytelling undercut any emotional uplift." On Metacritic, the film has a weighted average score of 44 out of 100, based on 13 critics, indicating "mixed or average reviews". Audiences polled by CinemaScore gave the film an average grade of "A" on an A+ to F scale.
