= Armageddon Summer =

1998 young adult novel by Jane Yolen and Bruce Coville

- First edition, 1998
- Author: Jane Yolen & Bruce Coville
- Language: English
- Genre: Young adult novel
- Publisher: Harcourt
- Publication date: 15 September 1998
- Publication place: United States
- Media type: Print (Hardback & Paperback)
- Pages: 272 pp (first edition, hardback)
- ISBN: 0-15-201767-4

Armageddon Summer is a 1998 young adult novel by Jane Yolen and Bruce Coville.

== Plot ==
Marina and Jed are both teenagers whose parents have joined a millennialist movement whose members call themselves "The Believers". When the cult's leader, Reverend Beelson, proclaims that the world will end on July 27, 2000 and only 144 of the faithful can go to the top of Mount Weeupcut in Massachusetts and be safe from the fiery wrath of God that will rain on all nonbelievers below, Marina is taken by her mother with her six siblings (with her father left to be "fried") and Jed comes with his father (with his sister Alice refusing to come with) to the mountaintop compound. With both parents distant and distracted, and the rest of the cultists preparing for Armageddon, Marina and Jed meet and fall in love.

Neither Marina nor Jed firmly believes that the world is going to end, though Marina finds comfort in the religion while she mourns for her left behind father. As the date of Armageddon grows nearer, none of the 144 Believers in the camp is allowed to leave, while a group of distressed relatives and Believers who missed the 144-person cutoff and want to be saved (known as "LMCs" - Last Minute Christians) grows outside the camp. Police are stationed outside to monitor the situation. As the story progresses, Jed comes to hate and fear "The Believers" for not allowing family members to visit members and the stockpile of weapons he discovers.

On the morning of Armageddon, Reverend Beelson hands out white robes to symbolise the members of the cult being angels. The entire compound gathers in the main hall, with Beelson preaching to the crowd, as armed men guard the doors. Suddenly, the door bursts open and a horde of the LMCs rush in. Chaos erupts. Jed's father shoots a woman who is attacking Jed, who flees outside to get help. After discovering the murdered police and their shot-out radios outside the broken-down compound gates, Jed uses his laptop (snuck in under a technology ban in the camp). Marina, meanwhile, gathers and rescues all the children she can find.

At the end of the story, it is revealed that 20 people out of 144 were killed (including Reverend Beelson and Jed's father), along with numerous LMCs and police officers. There is a close symbolism between the Armageddon that Beelson promises and the Armageddon that the believers experience.

== Style ==
The concept of the novel was originally Yolen's idea and she later asked Bruce Coville to co-write the story. The book is written with the viewpoints of Jed and Marina alternating every chapter. Coville wrote the chapters from Jed's perspective, and Yolen wrote the chapters from Marina's perspective. There are also occasional excerpts from Reverend Beelson's sermons, police transcripts, and FBI memos interspersed throughout the book for exposition.
