= I Was a Teenage Faust =

- Written by: Thom Eberhardt
- Directed by: Thom Eberhardt
- Starring: Josh Zuckerman; Noel Fisher; Morgan Fairchild; Robert Townsend; Caroline Elliott
- Countries of origin: United States; Canada
- Original language: English

Production
- Producer: Rose Lam
- Running time: 95 minutes

Original release
- Release: December 15, 2002

I Was a Teenage Faust is a 2002 made-for-television film of an adolescent who sells his soul to the Devil to achieve popularity. It was directed by Thom Eberhardt and although the film takes place in Indiana, it was filmed in south-western British Columbia.

== Plot ==
The film follows the story of socially inept adolescent Brendan Willy (Josh Zuckerman) who lives in Indiana. When he desires the affections of Twyla Day (Caroline Elliott), Mr. Five, (Robert Townsend) a tempter from Hell, approaches Brendan with an offer to make him popular.

== Cast ==
- Robert Townsend as Mr. Five
- Josh Zuckerman as Brendan
- Stuart Margolin as Mephisto
- Noel Fisher as Tom
- Caroline Elliott as Twyla / Su Su
- Iris Quinn as Ginger
- Stephen E. Miller as Joe Huntoon
- Crystal Heidrick as Loretta
- Morgan Fairchild as Babylonia
- Betty Phillips as Grammy
- Claire Riley as Teacher
- Scott McNeil as Temptor

== Reception ==
The film has a user rating of 47% on Rotten Tomatoes.
