= Life Doesn't Frighten Me =

1993 children's book by Maya Angelou

- Editor: Sara Jane Boyers
- Author: Maya Angelou
- Illustrator: Jean-Michel Basquiat
- Language: English
- Genre: Children's picture book
- Published: 1993
- Publisher: Abrams Books
- Media type: Print (hardcover)
- Pages: 40
- ISBN: 9781419727481

Life Doesn't Frighten Me is a children's book by American writer Maya Angelou. Originally released in 1993 by Stewart, Tabori, & Chang, the book was conceived and edited by Sara Jane Boyers. It combines a poem written by Angelou with illustrations by American artist Jean-Michel Basquiat. Neither the poem nor the paintings were created specifically for children, yet their simplicity convey feelings to create a "brave, defiant" tale that "celebrates the courage within each of us, young and old." For the 25th anniversary, Life Doesn't Frighten Me was re-released by Abrams Books in 2018.
