= The Search for Snout =

1995 novel by Bruce Coville

- Author: Bruce Coville
- Language: English
- Series: Rod Albright Alien Adventures
- Genre: Sci-Fi
- Publisher: Aladdin
- Publication date: November 1, 1995
- Publication place: United States
- Preceded by: I Left My Sneakers in Dimension X
- Followed by: Aliens Stole My Body

The Search For Snout, published in 1995, is the third book in the series Rod Albright Alien Adventures written by American author Bruce Coville. In the United Kingdom, it was published under the title Aliens Stole My Dad, as 'snout' is British slang for tobacco.

The audiobook is narrated by American actor Vincent Marzello.

== Plot summary ==
The Search For Snout picks up where the previous book left off. Introducing the crew of the Galactic Patrol vessel Ferkel to his earthling mother proves to be as difficult as predicted, and explaining that he's going with them to find his semi-alien father is an even harder task. But the real trouble starts when they find out that BKR (the pain-loving alien psycho antagonist) is on the loose, having taken control of the Ferkel's sister ship Merkel while the ship was delivering him to prison. The crew of the Ferkel has been ordered to seek out their enemy and recapture him.

After they question Smorkus Flinders (a muscle-bound alien from Dimension X) and learn something of BKR's current plan, Rod is contacted again by his friend Snout, master of the mental arts. Partly inspired by this contact, Grakker (the ship's commander) decides to break off from the Galactic Patrol and head for the Mentat instead, the school where Snout became a master of the Mental Arts (incidentally, the building is one big PLANT). There, he hopes to find a clue that could lead them to their fallen friend. During the journey, Grakker reveals some of his past, including how he got to know both Snout and BKR. Smorkus Flinders, having escaped from his suspended animation pod, manages to capture the entire crew... except for Elspeth (Rod's all-human cousin), who stowed away and was also in suspended animation as punishment. She manages to stop Smorkus and rescue the others. Also as a result of the battle, Rod's chibling (a small furball from dimension X) is injured from being thrown into a wall.

Later that night, Rod learns that his friend was forced into his third stage of life: a two-part animal. The first half, which is then named Seymour, resembles a squashed, hairless blue cat with four (later six) legs, a long tail, and a similar neck with a gigantic eyeball at one end. The other half is named Edgar, and looks the same as before. While both appear to have separate minds, Seymour is the half that is truly sentient, holding their shared brain in his body.

Soon after, they arrive at the Mentat and meet with the 'Head' Council, who are unable to help. However, they do reveal that all the messages which came from Snout are, in part, due to a direct link between Rod's mind and Snout's, created by an incident involving direct brain-to-brain training in the first book. They also question Smorkus Flinders, and through him contact BKR. Though they cannot help in regard to the Ferkada that Snout mentioned, they do agree to try and cure Smorkus Flinders, reverting him from a monster to a Normal (the species he used to be until he was caught in a nasty Reality Quake and turned into a monster).

Later that day, the Mentat's security force (led by an insectoid woman named Arly Bung) arrests Rod, Elspeth and the crew after being contacted by the Galactic Patrol. Imprisoned in the lowest regions of the Mentat, they are soon rescued by Selima Khan, another of Snout's kind who also attended the Mentat in his year. During their escape into the caves below the Mentat, Rod sees an ancient carving of his father. Selima Khan also reveals the plans of BKR and Smorkus Flinders: they intend to use a black hole to detonate a bomb that will disrupt the space-time continuum and eventually bring the flow of time itself to a complete stop, but require Rod's brain to do so, for an unknown reason. Later, he is contacted again and leaves the group to follow the message. Along with Seymour and Edgar, Rod winds up in the belly of a gigantic stone beast, and the trio journey deep into its bowels. Finally, they reach a chamber where Snout is laying, fading away into nothingness. But he is not alone, as Rod is reunited with his father (alias the Ferkada, one of the ancient founders of the Mentat) at last.

Rod's father (Ah-Rit Alber Ite, or Arthur "Art" Albright) reveals the truth about where he came from (the lost civilization of Atlantis, circa 35,000 years ago), and his personal history with BKR. He also reveals that he once fled with the crucial bit of information that BKR needs for his current plans and stored them in a safe place: Rod's brain. During this last part, BKR arrives with Smorkus Flinders, revealing part of his side of the story. He also arrives to get the information that he needs. Just in time, the Ferkel arrives as well, and the resulting battle ends with a stalemate: BKR has Ah-Rit in his grasp, and threatens to kill him if Rod (and the crucial information) aren't handed over to him.

Fortunately, there's a solution. Ah-Rit is released to the Ferkel, while Rod is handed over to BKR, and Snout transfers the contents of Rod's mind (including the crucial information) into Seymour, resulting in two minds living in one body. After the swap, BKR leaves with Rod's body. Afterward, Snout (now fully recovered from his coma-like state) reveals exactly what happened to him after he vanished from Dimension X. He was probing the dimension for something, and connected with something extenuatingly hostile, possibly Smorkus Flinders himself.

== Other books in the series ==
- Aliens Ate My Homework
- I Left My Sneakers in Dimension X
- Aliens Stole My Body

== See also ==
- Bruce Coville
