= Sandy Robson =

- Born: Sandy Wayne Robson; Peterborough, Ontario, Canada
- Years active: 1999–present

Sandy Wayne Robson is a Canadian actor, writer, director, and editor.

Robson was born in Peterborough, Ontario and raised in Toronto. He had his writing and directorial debut with his 2015 feature film Skyquake. Robson's acting highlights include Minority Report, iZombie, War for the Planet of the Apes, Dead Rising 2 and Crazy Canucks.

== Television ==
- Minority Report (2015)
- iZombie (2015)
- About a Girl (2007) - Dude
- Trash to Treasure (2003) - Host
- Love, of Course (2018) - Marcus

=== Guest appearances ===
- Twice in a Lifetime (1999) - Handler #1
- In a Heartbeat (2000) - Guttman
- Sue Thomas: F.B.Eye (2004) - Justin
- Kevin Hill (2005) - Major Paul Cahan
- Instant Star (2006) - Ken
- Psych (2008) - Logan
- Supernatural (2011) - Redd
- Helstrom (2020) - Alex Tilden
- The Last of Us (2025) - Lookout

== Filmography ==
- The Impossible Elephant (2001) - Lenny
- Twas the Night (2001) - Harry
- Out of the Ashes (2003) - Leiku's husband
- The Cheetah Girls (2003) - Firefighter
- Crazy Canucks (2004) - Jungle Jim Hunter
- The Winning Season (2004) - Dots Miller
- Cow Belles (2006) - Thomas
- Swindle (2013) - Anton Lefarve
- Skyquake (2015)
- Dead Rising 2 (2016)
- War for the Planet of the Apes (2017)
- Once Upon a Time (2017) - Sam Ochotta (season 7; co-starring; 3 episodes)
- The Marine 5: Battleground (2017) - Vincent
- Aliens Ate My Homework (2018) - Art Allbright
- Aliens Stole My Body (2020) - Art Allbright
