= Alex Zahara =

Canadian actor

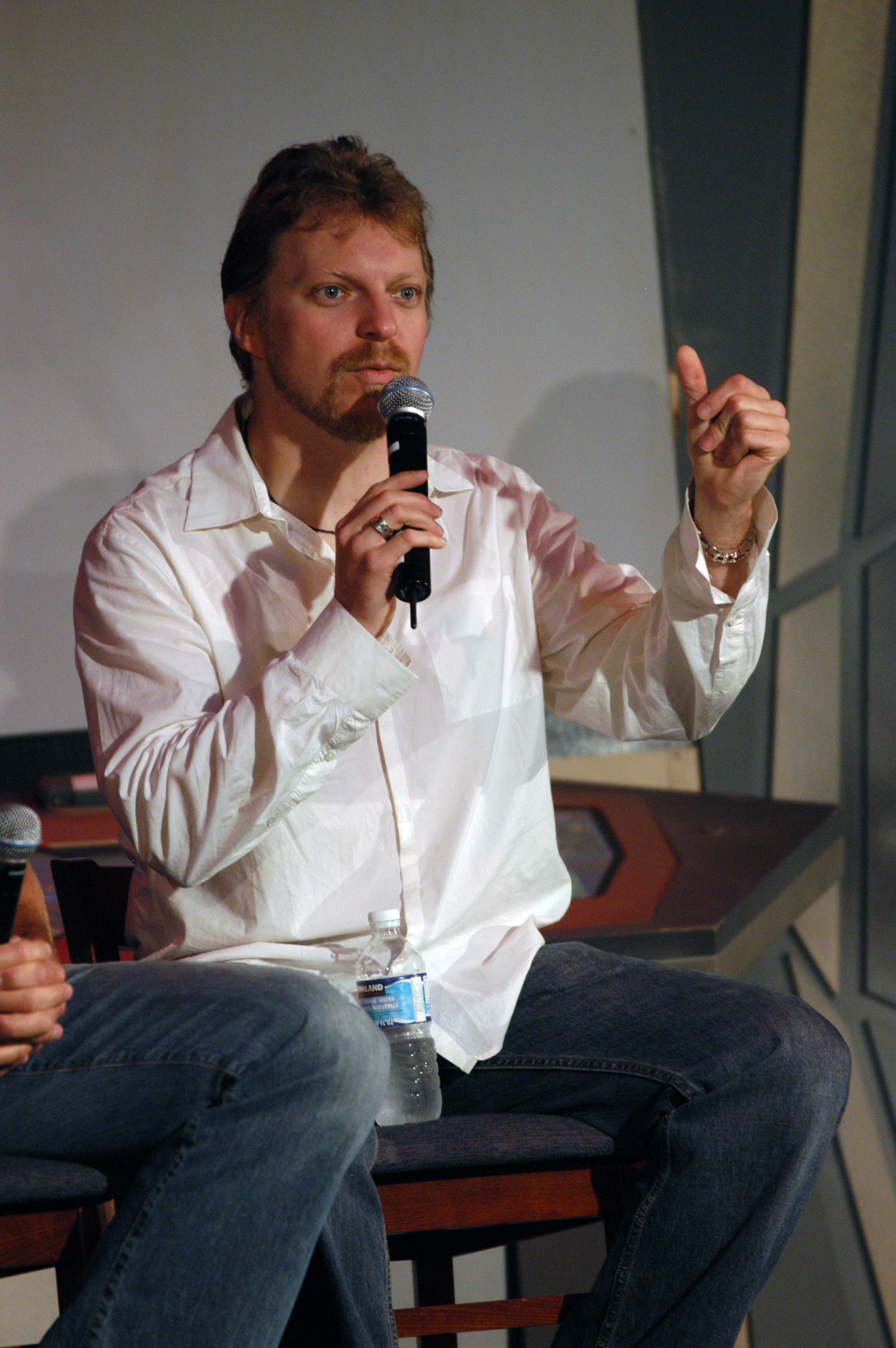
- Zahara at Gatecon in Vancouver, 2005
- Born: Grande Prairie, Alberta, Canada
- Occupation: Actor
- Years active: 1997–present
- Website: www.alexzahara.com

Alex Zahara (/zəˈhɑːrə/) is a Canadian actor, born in Grande Prairie, Alberta. Engaging in theatre from a young age, most notably performing in a stage adaptation of M*A*S*H, he later taught Acting for Teens at the Vancouver Film School. Zahara holds a Bachelor of Fine Arts degree, earned after studies at the University of Alberta and the University of British Columbia.

He has appeared in numerous television series, including Stargate SG‑1, Dark Angel, Psych, and The Man in the High Castle. His film roles span major productions such as The 13th Warrior, 2012, Horns, and the 2025 horror sequel Final Destination Bloodlines. Zahara is also a prolific voice actor, contributing to various anime and video game dubs, such as Iron Man: Armored Adventures, Gintama°, Mobile Suit Gundam 00, Dead Rising 2, and Lego Jurassic World.

== Select filmography ==
=== Television ===
- Stargate SG-1 as Alien Leader & Alien #1, Eggar, Iron Shirt, Michael Webber, Shy One, Warrick (1998–2003)
- The Sentinel as Gabe (1998)
- Dead Man's Gun as Tommy (1998)
- The Net as Marshall Roberts (1999)
- The Outer Limits as Karl Rademacher (Episode, "Tribunal") (1999)
- First Wave as Gregory (1999)
- Los Luchadores as Douglas Slade (2000)
- Andromeda as Hanno (2001)
- The Immortal as Demon Assistant (2001)
- Dark Angel as Johanssen (2001)
- Jeremiah as Ezekiel (2002)
- The Dead Zone as Major Reg Granowitz (2003)
- Kingdom Hospital as Sol Tarus (2004)
- Cold Squad as Steve Baker (2004)
- Tru Calling as Peter (2004)
- Young Blades as the Duke de Faure (2005)
- Blood Ties as Magnus (2007)
- Psych as Alan Zenuk (2010)
- The Man in the High Castle as SS Officer Oliver Diels (2015–2018)

=== Film ===
- The 13th Warrior as Norseman (1999)
- Kill Me Later as Officer Larry (2001)
- Walking Shadow as Lou Montana (2001)
- Babylon 5: The Legend of the Rangers as Dulann (2002)
- Open Range as Chet (2003)
- The Keeper as Derrick (2004)
- Ogre as Lawrence (2008)
- Another Cinderella Story as British director (2008)
- Ice Twisters as Damon Jarwell (2009)
- 2012 as Mr. Anton (2009)
- Horns as Dr. Renald (2013)
- A Daughter's Nightmare as Dr. Shwarzstein (2014)
- Aliens Stole My Body as Tar Gibbons (2020)
- Drinkwater as Mr. Babcock (2021)
- Final Destination Bloodlines as Howard Campbell (2025)

=== Voice acting ===
- B-Daman Fireblast as Slot Stinger, Greg Day (2014) (English dub)
- Dead Rising 2 as Theodore "Ted" Smith (2010)
- Dynasty Warriors: Gundam 3 as Lockon Stratos (2010) (English dub)
- Gintama° as Shinsuke Takasugi (2017) (English dub)
- Iron Man: Armored Adventures as Peter Corbeau (2009)
- Lego Jurassic World: The Secret Exhibit as Vic Hoskins (2018)
- Lego Jurassic World: Legend of Isla Nublar as Vic Hoskins (2019)
- Mobile Suit Gundam 00 as Lockon Stratos (English dub)
- My Little Pony: Friendship Is Magic as Jack Pot (2018)
- NANA as Mr. Mizuki (2006–2007) (English dub)
- ReBoot: The Guardian Code as Alpha Sentinel (2018)
- Roswell Conspiracies as Nick Logan (1999-2000)
- The Girl Who Leapt Through Time as Kousuke Tsuda (2006) (English dub)
- Future Boy Conan as Lepka (2021) (English dub)
