= Sean McNamara =

American film director (born 1962)

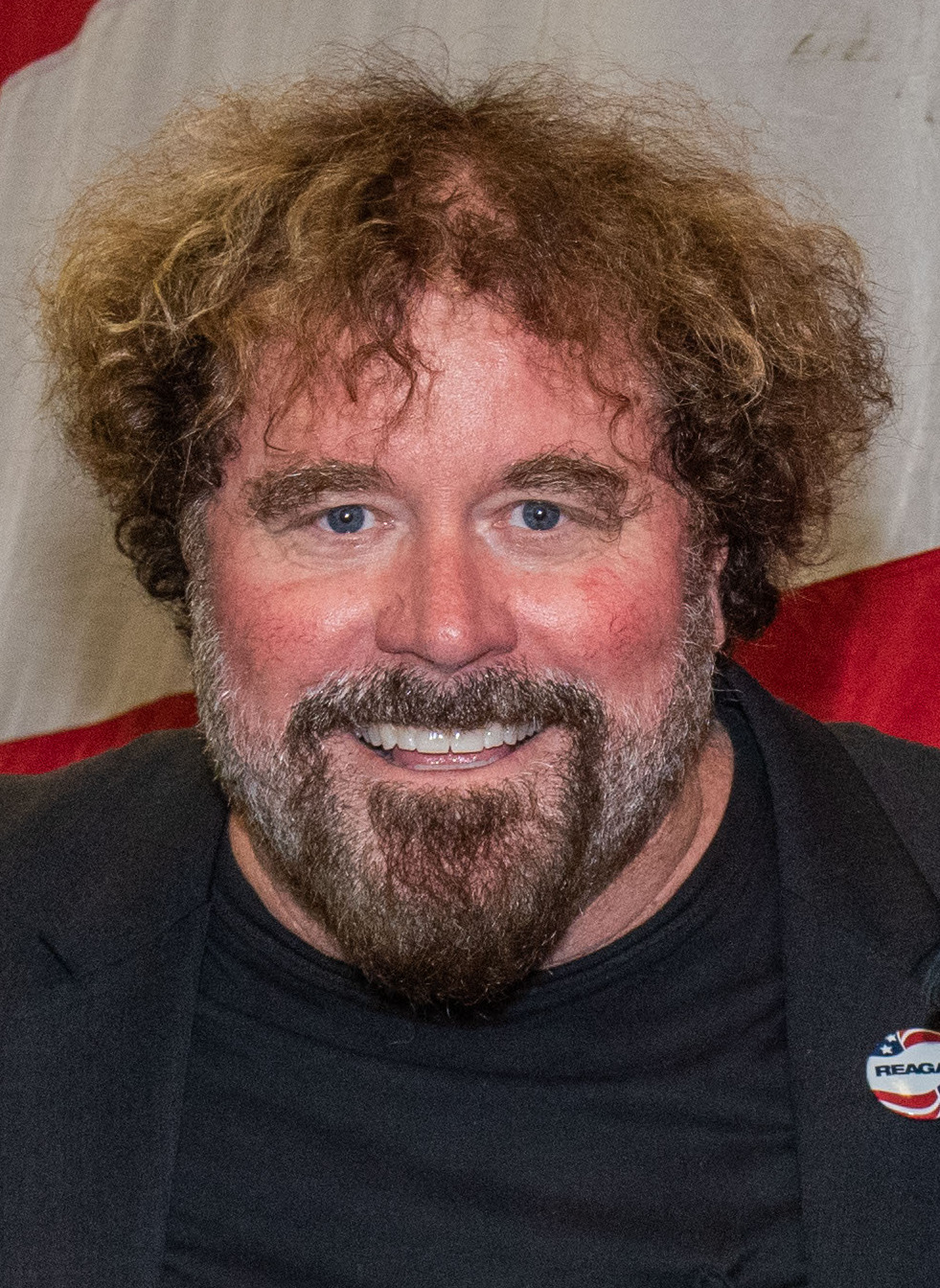
- McNamara in 2024
- Born: Sean Patrick Michael McNamara; May 9, 1962 (age 64); Burbank, California, U.S.
- Occupations: Director; producer; actor; screenwriter
- Years active: 1984–present
- Known for: Soul Surfer; The Miracle Season
- Website: seanmcnamara.com

Sean Patrick Michael McNamara (born May 9, 1962) is an American film director, producer, actor, and screenwriter. Originally a producer for the children's television series Kids Incorporated (1984–1994), he made his directorial debut with the independent film Hollywood Chaos (1989). McNamara later produced the Nickelodeon science fiction series The Secret World of Alex Mack (1994–1998).

McNamara gained recognition for serving as executive producer and directing episodes of the Disney Channel comedy series Even Stevens (2000–2003), as well as directing the television film The Even Stevens Movie (2003), which won him a BAFTA Award and earned him nominations for three Daytime Emmy Awards and three Directors Guild of America Awards. He later directed his first widely released film in Raise Your Voice (2004) and earned a Primetime Emmy Award nomination in 2005 for his work on the Disney Channel sitcom That's So Raven (2003–2006).

McNamara became more prolific as a film director starting in the late 2000s, directing Bratz (2007); Soul Surfer (2011), which is his highest-grossing release; Spare Parts (2015); The Miracle Season (2018); The King's Daughter (2022); and Reagan (2024).

== Life and career ==
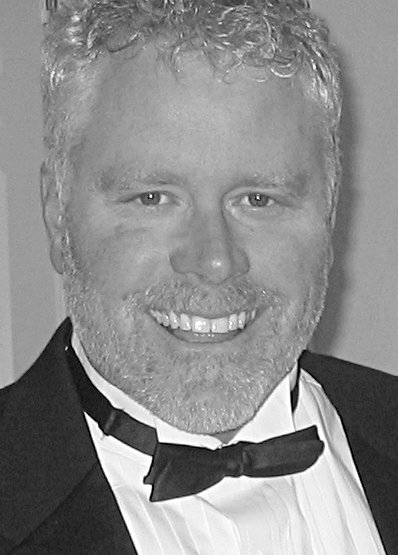
McNamara in 2007

McNamara was born in Burbank, California. He is best known for his feature films Soul Surfer and The Miracle Season. In the pre-teen film market he worked with Jessica Alba, Hilary Duff, Shia LaBeouf, Christy Carlson Romano, and Raven-Symoné. McNamara and David Brookwell are the founders of the Brookwell McNamara Entertainment production company. McNamara has continued to produce and create shows for MTV, The N, Nickelodeon, Disney Channel, and Cartoon Network. He collaborated with Shin Sang-ok to make Galgameth and 3 Ninjas: High Noon at Mega Mountain, starring Hulk Hogan.

McNamara briefly appeared as the singing cowboy in the Even Stevens musical episode "Influenza: The Musical", and as an alleged alien abductee in the episode "Close Encounters of the Beans Kind". McNamara also had a cameo appearance on That's So Raven, appearing as a plumber in the episode "Out of Control".

In 2016, McNamara was hired to direct the biopic of President Ronald Reagan titled Reagan. The film was released in 2024.

McNamara's 2026 film Home, filming in Vancouver, Canada, took its inspiration from the life of George Müller, and cast Lincoln Fox in his first feature acting role, as an immigrant child, Gustavo; Fox was featured in Bad Bunny's Super Bowl LX halftime show.

== Filmography ==
=== Film ===
Year	Title	Director	Producer	Writer
1989	Hollywood Chaos	Yes	Yes	No
1996	Galgameth	Yes	No	No
1998	3 Ninjas: High Noon at Mega Mountain	Yes	No	Yes
1998	P.U.N.K.S.	Yes	No	Story
1999	Treehouse Hostage	Yes	Yes	No
2001	Race to Space	Yes	Yes	No
2004	Raise Your Voice	Yes	Yes	No
2007	Bratz	Yes	No	No
2011	Soul Surfer	Yes	Yes	Yes
2013	Space Warriors	Yes	Yes	Yes
2013	Robosapien: Rebooted	Yes	No	No
2015	Spare Parts	Yes	Executive	No
2015	Hoovey	Yes	Yes	No
2015	Field of Lost Shoes	Yes	Co-executive	No
2018	The Miracle Season	Yes	No	No
2018	Orphan Horse	Yes	No	No
2020	Mighty Oak	Yes	Yes	No
2020	Aliens Stole My Body	Yes	Executive	No
2022	The King's Daughter	Yes	Yes	No
2022	Dangerous Game: The Legacy Murders	Yes	No	No
2023	On a Wing and a Prayer	Yes	No	No
2023	Vindicta	Yes	No	No
2024	Bau: Artist at War	Yes	Yes	No
2024	Reagan	Yes	No	No
2025	Soul on Fire	Yes	Yes	No

Direct-to-video

Year	Title	Director	Producer
1997	Casper: A Spirited Beginning	Yes	No
1998	Casper Meets Wendy	Yes	No
2006	The Cutting Edge: Going for the Gold	Yes	No
2009	Legally Blondes	No	Yes
2009	Into the Blue 2: The Reef	No	Yes
2009	Bring It On: Fight to the Finish	No	Yes
2013	Baby Geniuses and the Mystery of the Crown Jewels	Yes	Executive
2014	Baby Geniuses and the Treasures of Egypt	Yes	Executive
2018	Aliens Ate My Homework	Yes	Executive
2020	Cats & Dogs 3: Paws Unite!	Yes	No

=== Television ===
Year	Title	Director	Producer	Writer	Notes
1984–1994	Kids Incorporated	No	Yes	No	
1989	Totally Hidden Video	Yes	Co-producer	No	Directed 3 episodes
1991	Candid Camera	Yes	No	No	1 episode
1992	The Amazing Live Sea Monkeys	Yes	No	No	
1994	The Secret World of Alex Mack	Yes	Yes	Yes	Directed 3 episodes, wrote episode "The Feud"
1995	Sightings	Yes	No	No	3 episodes
2000–2003	Even Stevens	Yes	Executive	Yes	Directed 7 episodes, wrote 3 episodes
2003–2006	That's So Raven	Yes	Executive	Yes	Directed 13 episodes, wrote episode "Vision Impossible"
2004	Phil of the Future	Yes	Executive	No	Pilot episode
2006	Just for Kicks	Yes	Executive	Yes	Directed 4 episodes
2006	Cake	Yes	Executive	No	All 13 episodes
2006–2007	Dance Revolution	Yes	Executive	No	All 26 episodes
2006–2009	Beyond the Break	Yes	Executive	Yes	Also creator; Directed 6 episodes
2007–2008	Out of Jimmy's Head	Yes	Executive	No	Directed 5 episodes
2009	Jonas	Yes	No	No	Episode "Complete Repeat"
2009	Zeke and Luther	Yes	No	No	4 episodes
2011	Sonny with a Chance	Yes	No	No	Episode "New Girl"
2011	Shake It Up	Yes	No	No	Episode "Reunion It Up"
2011–2012	Kickin' It	Yes	No	No	5 episodes
2012	Jessie	Yes	No	No	Episode "Take the A-Train... I Think!"
2012	A.N.T. Farm	Yes	No	No	Episodes "Modeling assignmANT" and "ANTswers"
2012	Lab Rats	Yes	No	No	Episodes "Death Spiral Smackdown" and "Chore Wars"
2013–2015	Baby Geniuses Television Series	Yes	No	No	7 episodes
2015	Ties That Bind	Yes	No	No	Episode "Pilot" and "United Front"
2017–2018	Chesapeake Shores	Yes	No	No	6 episodes
2019	Gabby Duran & the Unsittables	Yes	No	No	Episodes "Crushin' It" and "Dia De La Dina"
2024	Shadrach	Yes	Executive	No	4 episodes

TV movies

Year	Title	Director	Producer	Writer
1999	Wild Grizzly	Yes	No	Yes
2000	The Trial of Old Drum	Yes	Yes	No
2003	The Even Stevens Movie	Yes	Executive	No
2005	Abe & Bruno	Yes	No	No
2011	The Suite Life Movie	Yes	No	No
2012	Shmagreggie Saves the World	Yes	Executive	No
2016	Just in Time for Christmas	Yes	Yes	No
2016	Love in Paradise	Yes	No	No
2018	Christmas in Evergreen: Letters to Santa	Yes	No	No
2019	Christmas in Evergreen: Tidings of Joy	Yes	No	No
2020	JL Family Ranch: The Wedding Gift	Yes	Yes	No
2021	Sister Swap: A Hometown Holiday	Yes	No	No
2021	Sister Swap: Christmas in the City	Yes	No	No

TV specials

Year	Title	Director	Executive Producer
2019	Roseanne Barr & Rabbi Shmuley Show	Yes	No
2021	Butch Bradley: From Las Vegas	Yes	Yes

== Personal life ==
McNamara is Catholic. He's the godfather of actress Christy Carlson Romano.

== Awards and nominations ==
Year	Work	Category	Result	Ref.
2001	Even Stevens	Daytime Emmy Award for Outstanding Children's Series	Nominated	
2001	Even Stevens	Directors Guild of America Award for Outstanding Directing – Children's Programs	Nominated	
2002	Even Stevens	British Academy Children's Award for International	Won	
2002	Even Stevens	Daytime Emmy Award for Outstanding Children's Series	Nominated	
2002	Even Stevens	Directors Guild of America Award for Outstanding Directing – Children's Programs	Nominated	
2003	Even Stevens	Daytime Emmy Award for Outstanding Children's Series	Nominated	
2004	The Even Stevens Movie	Directors Guild of America Award for Outstanding Directing – Children's Programs	Nominated	
2005	That's So Raven	Primetime Emmy Award for Outstanding Children's Program	Nominated	
2007	The Cutting Edge: Going for the Gold	Directors Guild of America Award for Outstanding Directing – Children's Programs	Nominated	
2022	The King's Daughter	Golden Raspberry Award for Worst Picture	Nominated	
