= Bruce Coville =

American novelist

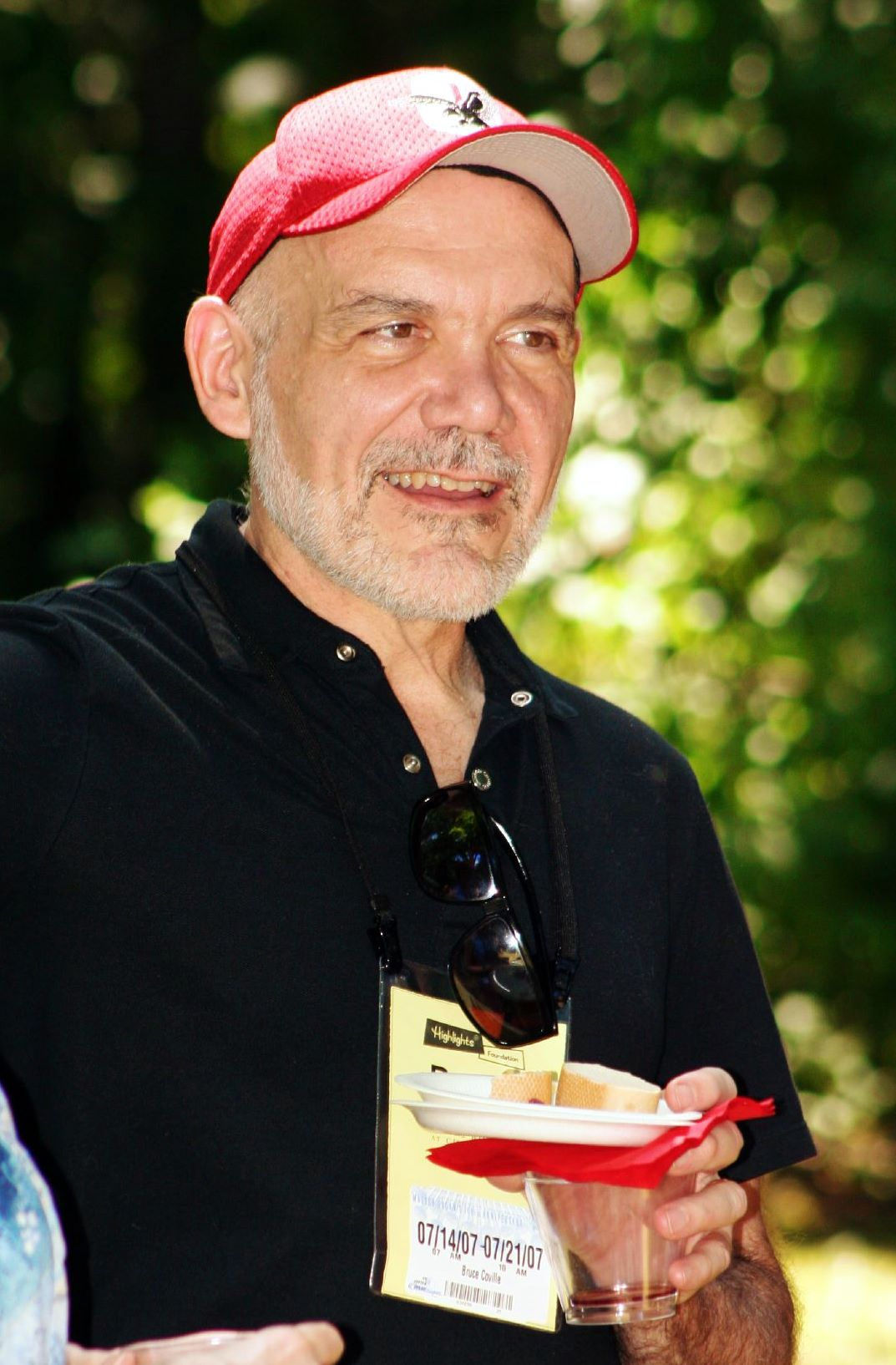
- Coville in 2007
- Born: Bruce Farrington Coville; May 16, 1950 (age 76); Syracuse, New York, U.S.
- Occupation: Novelist
- Spouse: Katherine Dietz
- Children: 3
- Writing career
- Language: English
- Years active: 1977–present
- Genre: Young adult fiction
- Website: www.brucecoville.com

Bruce Farrington Coville (/ˈkoʊvəl/, born May 16, 1950) is an author of young adult fiction. Coville was first published in 1977 and has written over 100 books.

== Biography ==
Coville was born on May 16, 1950, in Syracuse, New York, where he resided as of November 2012. Bruce Coville's father (born Arthur Farrington) was adopted by his aunt, where he adopted her surname of Coville. Growing up in what he called "farm country", Coville realized his bisexuality in his teens. While waiting to publish his first novel, Coville was employed in a number of professions including toymaker, gravedigger, cookware salesman, assembly line worker, and elementary school teacher working with second grade students and fourth grade students. Coville is wed to Katherine née Dietz (married when Coville was nineteen), and the two of them have three children: "a son, Orion, born in 1970; a daughter, Cara, born in 1975; and another son, Adam, born in 1981."

== Literature ==
Coville's love of books began as a child, reading "Nancy Drew, the Hardy Boys, Tom Swift, and zillions of comic books". He read "books that made [him] laugh, but also made [him] shiver in terror." Wanting to impart those sorts of feeling to others is what spurred his love of writing. Coville knew he wanted to be a writer by his mid-teens, and by age 19 he "never looked back." His first book, The Foolish Giant, a picture book illustrated by his wife, Katherine Coville, was published in 1977.

With no set paradigm for writing, Coville has successfully tried everything from writing from a strict outline to "writing from the seat of my pants." As of 2015, he uses what he calls an "ever-expanding outline" where he outlines the beginning and end of a novel, and works to fill in the middle later.

Coville has written over 100 books for young adults, with translations in over a dozen languages. He has said that even with over 100 books, it gets harder and harder to write each successive book; he's concerned with maintaining his level of quality and not repeating himself.

Coville is also the co-founder of Full Cast Audio, an audiobook company devoted to recording full-cast, unabridged copies of young adult fiction.

=== Awards ===
Coville has been the recipient of three Golden Duck Awards. He won first in 1992 for the novel My Teacher Glows in the Dark, in 2000 for I Was a 6th Grade Alien, and in 2006 for producing an audio adaptation of Robert A. Heinlein's The Rolling Stones.

In 2000, NESFA presented Coville with the Skylark Award for contributing significantly to science fiction, both through work in the field and by exemplifying the personal qualities which made the late "Doc" Smith well-loved by those who knew him.

In 2012, Coville was the 23rd recipient of the "Empire State Award for Excellence in Literature for Young People" as awarded by the New York Library Association.

=== Books ===
- Armageddon Summer (1998), written by Jane Yolen and Bruce Coville
