= List of Death in Paradise episodes =

Death in Paradise is a British–French crime comedy drama created by Robert Thorogood. The show is set in the fictional Caribbean island of Saint Marie (filmed in Guadeloupe) and focuses on a detective inspector (DI) from the UK and his police team solving murder mysteries on the island.

== Series overview ==
Series	Episodes	Originally released		Avg. UK viewers (millions)
Series	Episodes	First released	Last released	Avg. UK viewers (millions)
1	8	25 October 2011	13 December 2011	5.89
2	8	8 January 2013	26 February 2013	7.67
3	8	14 January 2014	4 March 2014	8.46
4	8	8 January 2015	26 February 2015	8.60
5	8	7 January 2016	25 February 2016	8.08
6	8	5 January 2017	23 February 2017	8.45
7	8	4 January 2018	22 February 2018	7.72
8	8	10 January 2019	28 February 2019	7.84
9	8	9 January 2020	27 February 2020	7.54
10	8	7 January 2021	18 February 2021	8.13
2021 Special		26 December 2021		7.96
11	8	7 January 2022	25 February 2022	7.52
2022 Special		26 December 2022		7.83
12	8	6 January 2023	24 February 2023	7.31
2023 Special		26 December 2023		6.61
13	8	4 February 2024	24 March 2024	7.30
2024 Special		22 December 2024		7.22
14	8	31 January 2025	28 March 2025	5.97
2025 Special		28 December 2025		6.1
15	8	30 January 2026	27 March 2026	5.14
2026 Special		27 November 2026		TBA

== Episodes ==
=== Series 1 (2011) ===
Ben Miller, Sara Martins, Danny John-Jules, Gary Carr and Don Warrington first appeared as Richard Poole, Camille Bordey, Dwayne Myers, Fidel Best and Selwyn Patterson

No. overall	No. in series	Title	Directed by	Written by	Original release date	UK viewers (millions)
1	1	"Arriving in Paradise"	Charles Palmer	Robert Thorogood	25 October 2011	6.78
Charlie Hulme (Hugo Speer), a British detective inspector, is found murdered in a locked panic room on the Caribbean island of Saint Marie owned by the Lavenders, Sarah (Coralie Audret) and James (Rupert Graves). Commissioner Selwyn Patterson demands that a UK officer investigate Charlie's death, so deadpan DI Richard Poole unwillingly flies out to Saint Marie to solve the mystery. Sgt Lily Thomson (Lenora Crichlow) and Officer Fidel Best tolerate him while Officer Dwayne Myers finds fault in his 'English' methods. Richard learns that Charlie was having an affair with Sarah Lavender, providing James with a motive to murder. Richard is convinced he has solved the case, but then James is also murdered, forcing Richard to look deeper into the case, and search for a mysterious woman seen at the house on the day of Charlie's death as well as ponder the question - how can you murder someone in a locked room? First appearance of DI Richard Poole (Ben Miller), DS Camille Bordey (Sara Martins), Officer Dwayne Myers (Danny John-Jules), Officer Fidel Best (Gary Carr), and Commissioner Selwyn Patterson (Don Warrington)
2	2	"Wicked Wedding Night "	Roger Goldby	Robert Thorogood	1 November 2011	6.53
A bride is shot through the heart with a spear gun and tumbles off a balcony just minutes after getting married, in a room to which she did not have the key. Richard teams up with new sergeant Camille to work out who would want the bride dead; he learns that no one had entered or left the fifth floor of the hotel room during the celebrations, which leads him to believe one of the party guests must be the killer. However, none seem to have concrete reasons to kill and all have alibis apart from the newlywed husband, after the maid is found strangled, Richard wonders if her cleaning in progress sign caused it all. The DI searches for a satisfactory cup of tea on the island, and eventually finds one from an unlikely source in Camille's mother, bar owner Catherine Bordey. First appearance of Catherine Bordey (Élizabeth Bourgine) Guest stars Robert Pugh as Mike Watson, Frances Barber as Diana Watson, Paterson Joseph as William.
3	3	"Predicting Murder"	Charles Palmer	Robert Thorogood	8 November 2011	5.31
Dwayne is present when Angelique Morel, a voodoo priestess (Mona Hammond) predicts her own death and who murders her, although it comes as a shock when she later dies in the island's local school just hours afterwards. Richard learns of an affair that took place years earlier in the school leading to the disappearance of a woman, who was the priestesses daughter. He turns his attention to Nicholas Dunham (Nicholas Farrell), the prime suspect and Fidel's old principal, who was involved in the disappearance of the woman and matches the description the voodoo priestess gave. But Nicholas has an alibi, leading Richard to question whether he is being set up or not.
4	4	"Missing a Body?"	Roger Goldby	James Payne	15 November 2011	5.82
Megan Talbot (Miranda Raison) walks into Saint Marie's police station covered in blood, and confesses to the murder of her abusive husband, Lucas (Neil Stuke). Lucas's body is initially nowhere to be found, leading Richard to believe she is innocent, while Camille disagrees. When the body is later found at sea, Richard still fails to believe Megan is behind his death, and as he interrogates Lucas's friends, Patrick (Derek Riddell) and Astrid Knight (Emma Fielding), his reasons to suspect one of them is the killer increase.
5	5	"Spot the Difference"	Alfred Lot	Harry Holmes	22 November 2011	5.45
Richard is embarrassed when a prisoner is stabbed in the back while handcuffed to him. Realising that his career may be over if he is unable to uncover who the murderer is, Richard looks into the prisoner's criminal history and learns he was a fraudster. With many of the suspects wanting the prisoner dead, Richard turns his attentions to the widow of the victim, convinced she knows more than she claims she does. The breakthrough clue in the case is the unexpected death of the widow on the day of her husband's funeral, exposing who the original murderer is.
6	6	"An Unhelpful Aid"	Alfred Lot	Robert Thorogood	29 November 2011	5.30
Dwayne and Fidel unite to solve the death of an experienced diver who drowns in ten feet of water when Richard falls ill with fever, while Camille is in Paris. As they begin to investigate the diver's death, the pair are quick to establish the diver was murdered. DS Angela Young (Shirley Henderson), a British detective on holiday, begins to intervene in the case and attempts to solve the mystery herself, but when she lacks progress in the investigation, Dwayne and Fidel go behind Angela's back to work on the case themselves and present Richard with all the evidence they have gathered, leading Richard to solve the murder before Angela. After solving the case, Richard is confronted by a furious Camille whose mother, Catherine, he accidentally insulted when ill, as the two argue, Dwayne and Fidel happily remark it has all gone back to normal.
7	7	"Music of Murder"	Paul Harrison	Jack Lothian	6 December 2011	5.66
Dwayne takes the team to the concert of a reformed rock band, but the lead singer is shot dead and found on the stage inside a coffin prop just minutes before the planned performance. With all the suspects having an alibi, Camille, Dwayne and Fidel begin to believe that it was suicide, but Richard is not convinced. Richard uses the photographs of the photographer at the concert, and identifies one of the alibis as being improvised.
8	8	"Amongst Us"	Paul Harrison	Robert Thorogood	13 December 2011	6.29
Dwayne delights in showing off Nadia, a new lady he meets while on a night out. However, his happiness is quickly cut short when Nadia is found murdered in her bed the following morning, with coins shoved in her mouth, and the house ransacked. Richard refuses to break protocol and treats Dwayne as a murder suspect, much to the team's outrage. Richard discovers that Nadia, who was actually called Rose, was an informant about to expose a money laundering scandal. The team struggle to find evidence to catch Rose's murderer, until Richard looks more in depth at the evidence he is already aware of. Fidel's wife, Juliet, goes into labour and gives birth to a daughter, Rosie.

=== Series 2 (2013) ===
No. overall	No. in series	Title	Directed by	Written by	Original release date	UK viewers (millions)
9	1	"A Murder on the Plantation"	Keith Boak	Delinda Jacobs	8 January 2013	8.20
Richard investigates the death of sugar plantation owner Roger Seymour when he is found dead with a machete in his back. Richard learns that the sugar plantation was once a major company, but fell apart when mistreatment of the workers led to them walking out. With the Seymour family all against each other, Richard knows one of them was the killer. However, with the family members having solid alibis and being in sight of each other at the time of Roger's murder, Richard seeks an alternative explanation to identify the killer.
10	2	"An Unholy Death"	Alrick Riley	Colin Bytheway	15 January 2013	7.84
Teenager Sister Therese dies in a fire at her room in the local Convent. It is believed that she died accidentally, when a cigarette set fire to her room, and the room was locked from the inside. However, when Richard finds a threatening note sent to Therese before she died, he believes that Therese discovered something she should not have, and had to die as a result of her discovery. Meanwhile, a family secret of Therese's is discovered, prompting an attack on one of the sisters at the church.
11	3	"Death in the Clinic"	David O'Neill	Dan Sefton	22 January 2013	7.98
The death of Valerie Dupree at a plastic surgery clinic leaves Richard and the team baffled, as it would appear that Valerie killed herself. Dr Jones reveals that Valerie was suicidal, but Richard is convinced that Valerie was actually murdered - her cup of tea suspected to be poisoned. However, as the results come back negative, Richard finds it difficult to find the means. Suspect Jayne believes that Valerie was having an affair with Paul, but Dr Jones reveals she was having an affair with Paul, providing them both with alibis. Richard then learns that the clinic itself was an illegal operation, providing criminals with new identities.
12	4	"A Deadly Curse"	Alrick Riley	Robert Thorogood	29 January 2013	7.68
A team of explorers visit Saint Marie in search of treasure, until the group's leader Daniel Morgan is injured in an explosion and team member Ian Parks is shot dead. Richard believes that Daniel was the intended target and Ian died accidentally, but then when Daniel is involved in another freak accident, Richard questions whether Daniel is the murderer, causing the accidents himself to seem as though he is being set-up. After asking Dwayne to bring him from the cells for questioning, they uncover a new obstacle; he has died overnight in the cells himself.
13	5	"Murder Onboard"	Keith Boak	Jack Lothian	5 February 2013	7.21
Camille's friend Aimee drops dead on a party boat, in front of Camille. Selwyn demands that an illegal alcohol brewing group are arrested as he was being pressured by the official distilleries, but Richard turns his priorities to catching the murderer instead. As he looks into the motives behind Aimee's death, Richard learns that Aimee was planning to move to Miami to sign a new recording contract, and Stephen was not happy about it, nor was Eloise, who was jealous of Aimee's successes, and wanted to sabotage her move to Miami.
14	6	"A Dash of Sunshine"	Alrick Riley	Colin Bytheway	12 February 2013	7.49
Richard investigates the death of June, who was strangled in her rented villa. The main suspects are Doug (June's husband and an old colleague of Richard's, whom he dislikes, from the UK), Janice (June's sister, who is the sole beneficiary of June's will) and cleaner Estelle. Richard learns Estelle is trying to sell June's stolen jewellery, but she has no real motive to kill June. When Janice recalls seeing one of the villa's owners leaving the crime scene, Richard begins to question whether June's murder is linked to a historical case back in the UK. Guest appearance of Ralf Little as Will Teague
15	7	"A Stormy Occurrence"	David O'Neill	James Payne	19 February 2013	7.42
Saint Marie prepares for a hurricane. Researcher Leo Downs is found dead and the scene is staged to look like the result of a hurricane. Richard works with his team to solve Leo's death and learns that Leo's colleagues saw him as a sycophant. He also learns that Damon had a motive to kill Leo, as Leo was in love with Amber, who was Damon's ex. Despite this, every suspect has an alibi. Additional evidence is discovered when Skype messages found between Leo and his mother reveal that Leo had major plans for his next research project.
16	8	"A Deadly Party"	Alrick Riley	Robert Thorogood	26 February 2013	7.50
Philanthropist Malcolm Powell is shot dead at a charity fundraiser event. All suspects were in view of Camille at the time and she later attempts to chase after a car attempting to escape, but the driver sliced the wheels of the police Land Rover. Malcolm's secretary, Vicky, claims that a man called Jack Roberts murdered Malcolm, but Jack Roberts is nowhere to be found. Dwayne tracks down the car Camille saw, but the boat tracks leading away from it are too small to make a proper getaway, so where on the island could he be? Richard learns that Malcolm fled to Saint Marie from the UK when he defrauded investors in his company and suspects he was blackmailed in the build up to his death. Fidel passes his sergeant exams and the team celebrate.

=== Series 3 (2014) ===
Ben Miller last appearance as Richard Poole and the show introduces Kris Marshall who took over as lead role as Humphrey Goodman

No. overall	No. in series	Title	Directed by	Written by	Original release date	UK viewers (millions)
17	1	"Death of a Detective"	Cilla Ware	Robert Thorogood	14 January 2014	8.69
As Camille, Dwayne and Fidel joke about saving Richard from a university reunion, one of the reunion members finds him stabbed to death with an ice pick. DI Humphrey Goodman flies over from the UK to solve the case, but the team find him odd and they all, especially Camille, miss Richard. With the case proving sensitive to the team, Humphrey takes the lead in the investigation. He learns that one of the main suspects, Roger Sadler, held a grudge against Richard for over 25 years, but when Humphrey questions Roger, his reasons to believe he murdered Richard subside. After looking through old photographs of Richard and his friends, Humphrey successfully solves the case. The team are delighted with Humphrey, but Humphrey is left heartbroken when his wife Sally (Morven Christie) phones him from back in the UK to tell him she has left him. Final regular appearance of DI Richard Poole (Ben Miller) First appearance of DI Humphrey Goodman (Kris Marshall) Guest stars Sophie Thompson as Angela Birkett, Helen Baxendale as Sasha Moore.
18	2	"The Wrong Man"	Cilla Ware	Daisy Coulam	21 January 2014	8.46
Thea Holmes stands in on the set of a horror film for her friend, Lexi Cunningham (Michelle Ryan). However, Thea is then found dead on the set, having been poisoned. Humphrey learns that Thea was imprisoned years ago for a mugging she committed that went wrong, but is convinced that it should have been Lexi who died, not Thea. He interrogates screenwriter Arnold Finch, who admits that he openly disliked Lexi. Humphrey also learns that Arnold was searching poisons up online. As Humphrey continues his investigations, a suspect dies - appearing to have committed suicide, although Humphrey is not convinced, and looks deeper into the investigation, determined to not let the case close.
19	3	"An Artistic Murder"	Dusan Lazarevic	Paul Logue	28 January 2014	8.04
Gigolo Carlton Paris is murdered after an art exhibition. Humphrey learns that Carlton phoned the police just minutes before he died, claiming that a woman had a gun and was going to shoot him. As Humphrey turns his attentions to the women on the island that Carlton had run into, he is left with a list of suspects and motives. Fidel begins to feel guilt over the death as he cut off Carlton because he thought having a gigolo as a best friend would look bad. The team also learn that after Carlton's murder, only his phone and an old guide book were stolen from his house.
20	4	"Ye of Little Faith"	Dusan Lazarevic	Ian Kershaw	4 February 2014	8.45
While a team of airline crew stay in a hotel on Saint Marie, air stewardess Natasha Thiebert is found dead. Humphrey investigates Natasha's death and discovers she had been informed of a promotion within the airline just hours before her murder. As evidence suggests that the pilot, Adam Frost, had been in Natasha's room prior to her death, the team are keen to talk to him. They find a bottle of poison in Adam's room with his fingerprints on, indicating he murdered Natasha, but Humphrey believes Adam is being set up.
21	5	"Political Suicide"	Robert Quinn	Robert Thorogood	11 February 2014	8.84
It is believed that Saint Marie's commerce minister committed suicide, as he had left a suicide note before his death, but the angle of the gun wound suggests that he was murdered. Humphrey looks into the minister's death and learns that he had an affair with his aide, Lena. When Lena is interviewed in the presence of her godfather, Marlon, by Humphrey and Camille, it is revealed that Marlon is Camille's father, who deserted her when she was six.
22	6	"The Early Bird"	Robert Quinn	JC Wilsher & Simon Winstone	18 February 2014	8.27
A group of bird watchers join the island of Saint Marie in search for its rare green parrot. However, while the group are wandering through the jungle, Mark Talbot is stabbed to death with his hunting knife. Humphrey and his team learn that Mark was an unpopular member of the birdwatching group, having had an affair with a fellow birdwatcher's wife, which resulted in death threats being made against Mark. As Humphrey learns that Mark was only out of the group's sights for a couple of minutes before his death half a mile away, he begins to question the ability of the killer.
23	7	"The Man with the Golden Gun"	Richard Signy	Jack Lothian	25 February 2014	8.40
Unpopular land developer Alex Jackson is shot to death on his privately owned island, so Humphrey and the team sail over to the island to solve the murder. The only people on the island at the time of the murder were Rosie, the housekeeper; Emily, the secretary; and Alex's three children. The prime suspect was the only one who had access to the murder weapon, but also the only one with an alibi. Bad weather traps Humphrey and the team on the island with the killer. Only one of Alex's children were set to inherit his business, and when Humphrey learns that Alex was planning to change his will, he solves the case. Guest appearance of Nikki Amuka-Bird as Anna Jackson.
24	8	"Rue Morgue"	Richard Signy	Robert Thorogood	4 March 2014	8.52
Emma Redding is found dead in her own room at a local retirement home; her death thought to have been suicide. However, with Emma's friends and fiancé all saying that Emma had a lot to look forward to in her life, Humphrey begins to suspect that she was actually murdered. While investigating Emma's murder, Humphrey is given a distraction, as his wife arrives on the island seeking a reconciliation. Humphrey decides he is happier living in Saint Marie, and once successfully solving Emma's death, confides in Fidel about his growing feelings for Camille. Final appearance of Sergeant Fidel Best (Gary Carr)

=== Series 4 (2015) ===
The show introduces Joséphine Jobert and Tobi Bakare as Florence Cassell and JP Hooper and the last appearance of Sara Martins as Camille Bordey

No. overall	No. in series	Title	Directed by	Written by	Original release date	UK viewers (millions) 7 day	UK viewers (millions) 28 day
25	1	"Stab in the Dark"	Richard Signy	Robert Thorogood	8 January 2015	8.92	9.26
A séance is held during the island's Fete Mouri festival, in an attempt to contact a murdered servant from 1850. However, while the door is closed and all the participants are holding hands, the owner of a rum distillery is murdered. The participants are convinced that the ghost of the servant has come back to kill, but Humphrey is not, and begins to seek an alternative explanation for the owner's death. Commissioner Patterson steps in to help the team following Fidel's departure from Saint Marie. Commissioner Patterson also introduces Sergeant Florence Cassell. First appearance of Sergeant Florence Cassell (Joséphine Jobert) Guest appearance of Don Gilet as Andre Morgan
26	2	"Hidden Secrets"	Richard Signy	Simon Winstone	15 January 2015	8.51	8.83
Jake Peters, owner of a surf school, is shot dead and robbed in his workshop, despite it being locked from the inside, and there being no other possible way out. One of Jake's students are already wanted by the police for stealing from the company, but Humphrey then realises that there are two more students with a reason to want Jake dead. Jake's doctor informs Humphrey that Jake was terminally ill, helping Humphrey solve the case. When faced with competition for Camille, Humphrey steps up his signs of affection towards her. Sergeant Florence Cassell prompts Dwayne to become a temporary workaholic.
27	3	"Damned If You Do..."	David O'Neill	Tom Higgins	22 January 2015	8.45	8.78
Saint Marie Heritage Society celebrate the island's history with a meal, but all the guests end up with food poisoning. When Francis Davison of the society dies from a significant amount more of the poisoning, a murder investigation begins, with Humphrey looking at the guests' motives. Only an hour before his death, the president rang Humphrey saying somebody was trying to murder him. Humphrey learns that the president's son argued with him just hours before his death, while the society's secretary, Teresa, was stealing the society's funds. As he continues to work to solve the mystery, Humphrey's strong feelings for Camille peak.
28	4	"Until Death Do You Part"	David O'Neill	Rebecca Wojciechowski	29 January 2015	8.69	9.11
Humphrey is called to a hotel when a bride is found dead in her room the morning after her hen party. The team quickly establish that the bride knew her murderer, as she willingly let them into her room before she was killed. Usefully, some 8-hour candles apparently denote the time of death. Camille ponders her future in Saint Marie when she is offered a permanent job in Paris. Humphrey decides to tell Camille how he truly feels about her in an attempt to dissuade her from leaving the island, but despite this, Camille ultimately decides it is time to move away to Paris. Final regular appearance of DS Camille Bordey (Sara Martins)
29	5	"Swimming in Murder"	Paul Murphy	Ian Kershaw	5 February 2015	8.47	8.89
With Camille gone, Florence is promoted to Detective Sergeant. New officer JP Hooper joins the team on Saint Marie. The lead singer of a pop group is electrocuted when a lighting rig falls in a swimming pool, and while all the suspects were in the studio at the time of the murder, they also held a grudge against the victim, who burned down a record producer's studio over 20 years ago. As Humphrey continues to search for the evidence to pinpoint the killer, he comes across a click beetle which is not native to the island, helping him solve the case. First appearance of Officer JP Hooper (Tobi Bakare)
30	6	"The Perfect Murder"	Paul Murphy	Mark Brotherhood	12 February 2015	8.38	8.85
The residents of Saint Marie celebrate when the volleyball team proceed to the final of the Inter-Island Volleyball Championships. Celebrations are soon shortened when high-profile player Shelley Kennedy is found in the back of her jeep, wrapped in a bedsheet, stabbed through the heart. With the news of Shelley's death quickly being reported from major news networks around the world, Humphrey and the team feel the pressure to catch Shelley's killer and understand why she was killed.
31	7	"She Was Murdered Twice"	Richard Signy	Dana Fainaru	19 February 2015	9.10	9.62 (Note: This episode was moved from the normal transmission time of 9:00pm to 8.25pm due to the two EastEnders 30th anniversary episodes that evening which were placed before and after this episode, receiving a ratings boost as a result.)
Overbearing boss Annette Burgess is murdered in her bed. Humphrey learns that her phone was stolen, and also that one of their main suspects, Dom, had secret links to Annette, giving him the biggest motive to murder. Dom admits to killing Annette, but then Humphrey discovers that Annette was actually dead before Dom had even shot her.
32	8	"Unlike Father, Unlike Son"	Richard Signy	Matthew Barry	26 February 2015	8.30	8.86
A murder suspect is shot dead in his prison cell. Humphrey learns that the victim was strongly disliked - with both his wife and brother wanting revenge. Despite this, Humphrey fails to comprehend how the murderer was able to get away with killing the victim, as JP and Dwayne were both guarding the cell at the time of the murder. Alongside the murder investigation, Humphrey's father flies over to Saint Marie to try and encourage Humphrey to return to the UK and reunite with his wife.

=== Series 5 (2016) ===
No. overall	No. in series	Title	Directed by	Written by	Original release date	UK viewers (millions) 7 day	UK viewers (millions) 28 day
33	1	"The Complex Murder"	Edward Bennett	Robert Thorogood	7 January 2016	8.71	9.24
Humphrey buys a new boat for himself on the island while at the same time, a millionaire philanthropist is murdered on his yacht, while all the members of the group on his yacht are in the sea, and in sight of each other. Next to the victim is a toy soldier, which baffles Humphrey. As the investigation gets underway, Humphrey and the team learn the philanthropist had run-ins with all of the suspects.
34	2	"One for the Road"	Edward Bennett	Dan Muirden	14 January 2016	8.17	8.70
Saint Marie's outgoing governor, Caroline Bamber, is poisoned after accepting a drink from Selwyn at her leaving party. As Humphrey checks Caroline's bag for any potential evidence, he finds an unsigned note warning Caroline of her own death. Caroline's private secretary, Ellery, informs Humphrey of an apparent blackmail scandal that was occurring between Caroline and the president, Francois. While working out why Caroline was murdered, Humphrey's search for a girlfriend through dating websites has little success.
35	3	"Posing in Murder"	Audrey Cooke	Tom Higgins	21 January 2016	7.83	8.41
Humphrey and the team are called to investigate the murder of a fashion model during a charity shoot. It transpires that the model had a stalker in the build up to her death, although she also had three other suspects with reasons to want her dead. All the suspects have alibis, until Humphrey uncovers a photograph which proves one of the alibis to be false. One of the models, Rosey, is an old crush of JP, and they begin dating.
36	4	"A Personal Murder"	Audrey Cooke	Emma Goodwin	28 January 2016	7.78	8.41
Dwayne receives a text from his dead friend, Cedrik, claiming he was murdered, just minutes after eulogizing him at his funeral. The coroner had recorded Cedrik's death as natural, but further analysis of the scene of his death reveals Cedrik was actually smothered. With a limited number of suspects, Humphrey questions them all individually, but learns they were all playing cards on the night of Cedrik's death. Then, when Humphrey talks with an elderly friend of Cedrik's, he learns of an occurrence 45 years ago, providing a motive for murder.
37	5	"Lost Identity"	Roger Simonsz	Robert Thorogood	4 February 2016	8.14	8.78
While Humphrey's aunt Mary is visiting him on the island, she witnesses businessman John Green fall to his death from a balcony. John was new to Saint Marie and did not know anyone, although it soon turns out that John Green is a fake identity, with the victim actually under witness protection on the island six years earlier. When Mary provides Humphrey with some information she manages to remember, Humphrey solves the case.
38	6	"Dishing Up Murder"	Roger Simonsz	Dana Fainaru	11 February 2016	7.90	8.51
Following the launch of his new restaurant, Robert Holt is stabbed to death. His phone and wallet are stolen, with Humphrey and the team initially suspecting that a robbery is to blame for the incident. A bankrupt ex-prisoner is the only suspect to not have an alibi on the night of the murder, but the suspects with alibis have more developed motives for the murder. Video footage taken illegally in the restaurant proves helpful in helping Humphrey realise who the real killer is.
39	7	"The Blood Red Sea"	Richard Signy	Will Fisher	18 February 2016	8.00	8.57
Just hours after an argument with rival treasure hunter Newton Farrell, Tosh Walker is murdered on Newton's boat; his corpse then thrown in the sea. Newton is the prime suspect: the murder weapon is his and Tosh phoned his wife just moments before he died. However, Newton was seen at a drinking bar when Tosh died, puzzling Humphrey and his team, who cannot understand why Newton was set up, particularly by the victim.
40	8	"Flames of Love"	Richard Signy	Matthew Barry	25 February 2016	8.09	8.73
A tourist, Sian Evans, is found dead in her locked bathroom. All evidence points to Sian committing suicide, but Humphrey is reluctant to believe she was not murdered. His suspicions are soon confirmed when he learns that all of the suspects had various motives. Humphrey also bumps into (nearly literally) Martha Lloyd (Sally Bretton) whom he knows from his time in England and they set up a date, but JP's last minute nerves before his wedding to Rosie nearly ends the new romance before it can begin.

=== Series 6 (2017) ===
No. overall	No. in series	Title	Directed by	Written by	Original release date	UK viewers (millions) 7 day	UK viewers (millions) 28 day
41	1	"Erupting in Murder"	Claire Winyard	Dana Fainaru	5 January 2017	9.26	9.81
Volcanologist Stephen Langham is found dead by the side of a live volcano, with all evidence pointing to death by natural causes, although Humphrey believes otherwise. All of Stephen's colleagues have believable alibis, having clocked into the research centre using the entry card system at the time of Stephen's death. The only other suspect, the island's mayor Joseph Richards, was absent at the time of the murder, leaving Humphrey and the team unsure of what happened on the day of Stephen's death.
42	2	"The Secret of the Flame Tree"	Jermain Julien	Kelly Jones	12 January 2017	8.69	9.39
Florence's former classmate, Esther Monroe, is found dead at the foot of a cliff. Her death echoes the events of a suicide in local author Sylvie Baptiste's book, The Flame Tree. The prime suspects: Sylvie, her editor Patricia and organisers Anna and Oliver all have alibis for each other. Humphrey also learns that Oliver attempted to rape Esther prior to her death, and that Sylvie has a long-lost sister, Lizzie. As the evidence begins to build, Humphrey realises who the killer is. Unimpressed by the candidates to be the new mayor of Saint Marie, Catherine decides to stand herself.
43	3	"The Impossible Murder"	Claire Winyard	Alex Walker	19 January 2017	8.21	8.91
Humphrey takes Martha on a romantic weekend to a hotel, but their time spent together is limited when the brother of the hotel's manager is murdered. Humphrey cannot understand how the murder was successfully carried out when the only access to the victim's room was via a staircase, which Humphrey had his eyes on the whole time. Humphrey suspects Irie Johnson, the hotel receptionist, may have played a role in the murder when the victim learned that Irie was masterminding a credit card scam. However, a chance discovery by Dwayne helps the team realise the true identity of the murderer.
44	4	"Stumped in Murder"	Jermain Julien	Dan Muirden	26 January 2017	7.96	8.67
The president and star player of Saint Marie's cricket club is found shot dead on the pitch after a night out. The team's captain, Gus, is initially suspected of the murder, until Humphrey learns that the president's son, Torey, argued with his father on the night of his murder. The team then also learn that the victim was being blackmailed, and that the victim's wife benefitted greatly from his death.
45	5	"Man Overboard – Part One"	Richard Signy	Robert Thorogood	2 February 2017	8.04	8.82
Tom Lewis is murdered on his boat, five miles out at sea, while partying with girlfriend Sophie and her friends Lucy, Hema and Rachel. All the suspects alibi each other, while Lucy also tells Humphrey that she witnessed Tom make a secret phone call and place cash into a moneybag, which has now gone missing. A button is discovered on the floor of the boat, but none of the suspects recognise it. The logo on the button links Tom to a bank in the UK. Humphrey, Dwayne, Florence and the suspects all fly over to England, where DI Jack Mooney assists them with their enquiries. As the team and Jack question the bank staff — Steve Thomas, Frank Henderson, Martin West and Dominic Green — they learn that Frank had a rendezvous with Tom before Tom died. Frank denies any knowledge of a meeting with Tom; Frank himself is then murdered. First appearance of DI Jack Mooney (Ardal O'Hanlon)
46	6	"Man Overboard – Part Two"	Richard Signy	Robert Thorogood	9 February 2017	8.71	9.23
While Humphrey investigates Frank's murder in the UK, in Saint Marie JP and Selwyn learn that Tom was smuggling rum. A memory card found by the pair reveals that Steve Thomas is Tom's son. Humphrey questions Steve, who is now the prime suspect in the murder investigation, but he then learns that two other suspects were determined to prevent Frank from signing an investment deal. Humphrey manages to eliminate Steve from the investigation, and when he uncovers a hidden family link, he solves the case with Jack. After solving the mystery, Humphrey decides he is happier back living in London with Martha. Humphrey sends Jack out to Saint Marie for a holiday as a temporary replacement and he is accompanied by his daughter, Siobhán (Grace Stone). Final appearance of DI Humphrey Goodman (Kris Marshall)
47	7	"In the Footsteps of a Killer"	Simon Delaney	Dana Fainaru	16 February 2017	8.32	8.97
As Jack settles to his new life in Saint Marie, he works with the team to try and understand why tourist Tyler McCarthy (John Ross Bowie) has walked into the police station and claimed that he can provide an alibi for Nadine Hunter, who was imprisoned eight years ago for the murder of Julie Matlock, her employer. Jack interviews Julie's widower, Ian, and learns he was close to Nadine prior to her death. When the team learn that Julie's body has gone missing, they suffer a setback in the case, although analysis of a sound recording which includes the fatal shot from the gun which killed Julie helps Jack identify the real murderer.
48	8	"Murder in the Polls"	Simon Delaney	Will Fisher	23 February 2017	8.42	8.96
The islanders on Saint Marie begin voting for their new mayor, with Dwayne on security. However, candidate Victor Pearce is murdered in one of the polling booths. The two rival candidates, Catherine and Peter Baxter, become immediate suspects. Victor's son is soon also brought into the investigation when the team learn that son Kemar was his heir. Jack decides to reconstruct the crime scene in an attempt to artfully identify the killer. Jack impresses Selwyn, who offers Jack a permanent position at the police station.

=== Series 7 (2018) ===
No. overall	No. in series	Title	Directed by	Written by	Original release date	UK viewers (millions) 7 day	UK viewers (millions) 28 day
49	1	"Murder from Above"	Jonathan Gershfield	Robert Thorogood	4 January 2018	8.17	8.79
Diane Smith falls to her death from her hotel balcony on the day of her wedding to billionaire Philip Marston. Jack is convinced Diane was murdered, as she had not put the lid back on her nail varnish before she fell from the balcony. The suspects are the uncooperative hotel manager, as well as Marston's children who devised a cunning plan to prevent their spoiled lifestyles being curtailed after the wedding. Florence injures herself when catching a suspect, putting her out of work temporarily.
50	2	"The Stakes Are High"	Stewart Svaasand	Jake Riddell	11 January 2018	8.04	8.63
The final of a poker tournament takes place in Saint Marie, with a $3 million prize for the winner. However, during the match, one of the finalists, Bobby Rodrigues, drops dead at the table. Jack initially suspects that Bobby was killed by a poisoned playing card, but he then learns that Bobby's cigar was poisoned. Suspicion falls on Bobby's closest rival, Ray Campbell, until a family secret involving Bobby and the card dealer is uncovered. With Florence confined to desk duty, Dwayne gets a temporary promotion to detective.
51	3	"Written in Murder"	Jonathan Gershfield	Justin Young	18 January 2018	8.22	8.78
After he goes swimming alone one morning, author Frank (or Francis) O'Toole's body is pulled from the sea with a knife through his heart. Prior to his death, Frank argued with his agent, Larry, over his potential switch to another agent, as Frank's books were failing to sell under Larry's agency. The number one suspect is the invisible user of a hidden boat, Otis Falconer, whom Jack and the team try to track down, but find an almost non-existent record on him until Jack realises an anagram points to his identity. Elsewhere, Dwayne meets a potential new love interest but is hampered by his temporarily sharing Jack's home. First appearance (as a recurring character) of Darlene Curtis (Ginny Holder)
52	4	"The Healer"	Stewart Svaasand	Tom Higgins	25 January 2018	7.65	8.34
Steadman King, a well-known faith healer, returns to Saint Marie with his wife, Amelia, after 35 years away from the island. When Steadman carries out a healing on a childhood friend, terminally ill Fabienne is poisoned and dies. Jack and the team are convinced from the start that Steadman himself is responsible for the murder, but they quickly become confused when no one else from the congregation who drank from the same cup as Fabienne were poisoned. When Amelia reveals to Jack the real reason for her and Steadman's return to Saint Marie, it unearths an event involving Steadman that happened years ago.
53	5	"Murder on the Day of the Dead"	Ian Barnes	Robert Thorogood	1 February 2018	7.53	8.13
As Saint Marie celebrates Day of the Dead, the organiser of the charity auction at the yacht club, Daisy Anderson (Zahra Ahmadi), is murdered after sending a panic-stricken message to her husband, Finn. Jack and the team discover that Daisy had an affair with yacht club member Adam Warner, which Finn knew about and was filing a divorce over. However, all of the suspects in the case have alibis. After noticing a butterfly on Daisy's body which should be in hibernation, Jack is provided with a big clue over Daisy's murder.
54	6	"Meditated in Murder"	Ian Barnes	Damian Wayling	8 February 2018	7.38	7.94
Jack and the team are called to a spiritual retreat where the owner, Daniel Friend, is found dead. At the time of the murder, all the suspects in the case were meditating and in sight of each other. One of the suspects, Bryn Williams, an undercover journalist, planned to expose Daniel as a fraud, while other suspect Gabe had reportedly had an argument with Daniel prior to his death. The final suspect Eva had lost money to Daniel, but even though all have a motive, Jack finds it difficult to establish opportunity for any of them. When Jack learns of Daniel's criminal history, he finds out that Daniel was actually called Michael Bennett. It also proves to be a vital clue in helping the team understand why Michael was killed.
55	7	"Dark Memories"	Sarah Walker	James Hall	15 February 2018	7.6	8.22
JP's old school friend, Cordell Thomas, confesses to the murder of Eugene Jones. Jack is unconvinced that Cordell killed Eugene based on the peanut that Eugene was clenching in his fist when he died. Jack and the team then find stolen belongings of former convict Charlie Blake at Eugene's house, while also learning that Eugene's sister had issues with Eugene prior to his death. Elsewhere, Dwayne celebrates his birthday with his girlfriend, Darlene, and his father, Nelson, who pays him a visit. Note: This episode was dedicated to guest star Larrington Walker who died before his role was completed. Departure (as a recurring character) of Darlene Curtis (Ginny Holder)
56	8	"Melodies of Murder"	Sarah Walker	Will Fisher	22 February 2018	7.19	7.85
When Billy Springer, the lead guitarist of a popular Saint Marie reggae band is murdered in his dressing room following a concert, Jack must solve a double murder, including a case that has haunted the Commissioner for 30 years. Meanwhile, Nelson Myers joins his son, Dwayne, and makes himself at home in the Caribbean. Departure of Officer Dwayne Myers (Danny John-Jules)

=== Series 8 (2019) ===
No. overall	No. in series	Title	Directed by	Written by	Original release date	UK viewers (millions) 7 day	UK viewers (millions) 28 day
57	1	"Murder on the Honoré Express"	Stewart Svaasand	Paul Logue	10 January 2019	8.34	8.94
Paul Raynor (Andrew Tiernan) is stabbed to death on a bus to Honoré. The only four possible suspects are three other passengers and the bus driver, none of whom could have possibly committed the crime without being seen by the others. As the team investigate, they soon discover that all four parties had a reason to want Raynor dead, relating to his role in the robbery of a casino fifteen years ago, leaving Jack to determine which motive prompted the murder.
58	2	"Murder Most Animal"	Stewart Svaasand	Justin Young	17 January 2019	7.91	8.57
Local zookeeper Xander Sheppard (Jonathan Kerrigan) is found shot in the back with a poisonous dart. The only plausible suspects are the other members of his staff – including his wife, brother, sister – all of whom were with each other at the time of death. As the investigation reveals ties to a rumoured death at the zoo years ago, the team must also break in their newest team member; Ruby Patterson (Shyko Amos), the commissioner's newly-graduated niece. First appearance of Officer Ruby Patterson (Shyko Amos)
59	3	"Wish You Weren't Here"	Sarah O'Gorman	James Hall	24 January 2019	7.54	8.20
Television presenter Catrina McVey (Kimberley Nixon) is murdered while filming the latest episode of her travel programme on the island. Disagreements with her producer, Bill Calder (Ron Cook), seem to suggest a potential motive, but when Bill himself is later murdered, Jack finds himself investigating a completely new line of enquiry. Meanwhile, Florence returns from leave and announces her engagement.
60	4	"Frappe Death Day"	Sarah O'Gorman	Tom Nash	31 January 2019	7.98	8.12
Local coffee tycoon Benedict Dacre (Robert Portal) is shot dead after announcing his intention to sell the family business and retire. Jack and the team suspect that one of his relatives, jealous of intentions, pulled the trigger, but the inter-family rivalry further complicates the investigation. Meanwhile, Commissioner Patterson asks Jack to look into an illegal crab racing ring operating on the island.
61	5	"Beyond the Shining Sea – Part One"	Jermain Julien	Sally Abbott	7 February 2019	7.47	8.30
The local fishing community are shocked when their festival queen, Tiana Palmer (Nicôle Lecky), is murdered while on her maiden boat trip around the island. Jack tries to work out how a missing loaf of bread could be connected to the murder, but matters are further complicated when Florence's fiancé Patrice (Leemore Marrett Jr.) is linked to the victim.
62	6	"Beyond the Shining Sea – Part Two"	Jermain Julien	Roger Enstone	14 February 2019	7.75	8.34
Tragedy strikes close to home, leaving the team in shock. With two victims now having met the fate of the same killer, Jack realises he must bring the case to a swift conclusion in order to prevent any further casualties. A new lead provides the team with a potential identity of the killer. Departure of DS Florence Cassell (Josephine Jobert)
63	7	"Murder on the Airwaves"	Richard Signy	Robert Thorogood	21 February 2019	7.61	8.31
Local DJ Dezzie Dixon (Terence Maynard) is murdered in a locked room during a live broadcast of his weekly radio programme. Fellow DJ Bunny Hicks (Errol Trotman-Harewood), who has long waited to step into Dezzie's shoes, soon becomes prime suspect when his alibi fails to stand up to scrutiny. But as the baffling case tests the team's puzzle-solving skills to the limit, Jack finds himself the subject of an internal affairs investigation, led by DS Madeleine Dumas (Aude Legastelois). First appearance of DS Madeleine Dumas (Aude Legastelois)
64	8	"Murder Begins at Home"	Richard Signy	James Hall	28 February 2019	8.09	8.56
A torrential rainstorm lashes the island, forcing three campmates and their trip leader to seek refuge. By morning, one of the campmates, Adam Renshaw (Tristan Sturrock), is dead; his body having been somehow dumped inside the locked police station. Jack must not only work out who the killer is, but how he or she managed to leave the victim on his doorstep.

=== Series 9 (2020) ===
No. overall	No. in series	Title	Directed by	Written by	Original release date	UK viewers (millions) 7 day	UK viewers (millions) 28 day
65	1	"La Murder Le Diablé"	Ian Barber	James Hall	9 January 2020	8.12	8.98
On New Year's Eve, Vanessa McCormack (Amanda Hale) is found stabbed to death in her own home. A witness reports seeing a masked man, disguised as "le diable" (the devil), fleeing the scene. Hours later, the victim's brother-in-law, Donald (Samuel West), is attacked by the same assailant, but survives. Jack and the team must work out how the two cases are linked.
66	2	"A Murder in Portrait"	Ian Barber	Tom Nash	16 January 2020	7.62	8.60
Renowned artist Donna Harman (Louise Brealey) is found poisoned in her studio, having seemingly ingested an energy drink laced with cyanide. Aside from the victim, nobody else had access to either the drink or the studio prior to her death - so just how did the killer strike? Meanwhile, Jack's romance with Anna (Nina Wadia) continues to blossom during a boat trip.
67	3	"Tour De Murder"	Paulette Randall	Oriane Messina & Fay Rusling	23 January 2020	7.45	8.28
Cyclist Xavier Prince is found dead after seemingly plunging from a ravine during the Tour des Antilles. All signs point towards a tragic accident, except from a strip of fabric from a team shirt found at the scene - that didn't belong to the victim. Elsewhere, Jack tries to convince Anna to remain on Saint-Marie, but she has other plans for their blossoming romance.
68	4	"Pirates of the Murder Scene"	Paulette Randall	Will Fisher	30 January 2020	7.43	8.31
While investigating the case of a man found dead in a boat, Jack has to consider whether to accept Anna's offer to join her on her trip or remain on Saint Marie. In the end, with the case solved, Jack decides not to take up Anna's offer, but learning that his daughter has graduated prompts him to return to London and his old life, having decided that his time on the island has been more the result of him running away from his life rather than moving on. Final appearance of DI Jack Mooney (Ardal O'Hanlon)
69	5	"Switcharoo"	Richard Signy	Robert Thorogood	6 February 2020	7.69	8.44
As the team investigate an apparent suicide at a hotel, they are forced to call in DI Neville Parker, a detective who suffers from several serious allergies, only for Parker to determine that the 'suicide' is actually a murder, despite the fact that there is no way for the killer to have left the room as both the room door and bathroom door were locked from the inside. First appearance of DI Neville Parker (Ralf Little)
70	6	"Murder on Mosquito Island"	Richard Signy	Tom Nash & Kefi Chadwick	13 February 2020	8.04	8.48
The team investigate the death of a survival instructor. He was found dead in the woods while giving a training course on a small deserted island off the coast of Saint Marie. During the investigation DI Parker manages to make himself very unpopular with the commissioner. The team however, slowly start to appreciate his skills in solving a murder.
71	7	"Death in the Salon"	Jennie Darnell	James Hall & Victoria Asare-Archer	20 February 2020	7.18	8.00
A hairdresser is found dead in her own salon. Three other people were present, but none of them saw or heard anything. Why was the washing machine switched on a couple of minutes after the murder took place? And where is the murder weapon? DI Parker's annoying habits get on everyone's nerves. He believes lizard Harry is the cause of a new rash he developed, so Harry has to go. This doesn't go entirely to plan...
72	8	"Now You See Him, Now You Don't"	Jennie Darnell	James Hall	27 February 2020	6.77	7.49
A blind actress is the only witness to her husband's murder. But can she really be trusted? Final appearances of DS Madeleine Dumas (Aude Legastelois) and Officer Ruby Patterson (Shyko Amos)

=== Series 10 (2021) ===
No. overall	No. in series	Title	Directed by	Written by	Original release date	UK viewers (millions) 7 day	UK viewers (millions) 28 day
73	1	"Today With Tourné"	Richard Signy	Justin Young	7 January 2021	8.42	9.15
A TV reporter about to broadcast an expose on a prominent Saint Marie broadcaster is found dead in her swimming pool. DI Parker is convinced her co-host Garfield Tourné is responsible but at the time he was live on air interviewing his daughter. DS Cassell returns to the island to take up the vacant detective sergeant's position offered by Commissioner Patterson who does not mention Parker's idiosyncrasies for fear she would not accept. The commissioner keeps the team up-to-date on the whereabouts of Officer Ruby Patterson, who departed to Paris with DS Madeleine Dumas, however informs the team she will be extending her hiatus indefinitely. Return of DS Florence Cassell (Joséphine Jobert)
74	2	"I'm Here About A Murder"	Richard Signy	Emma Goodwin	14 January 2021	7.71	8.50
An archaeologist is poisoned with arsenic during a dig and Parker soon has a suspect who confesses, however evidence points to her not being the culprit. The owners of the land also fall under suspicion as they were against the dig. The problem for Parker was how was the arsenic ingested, with no suspect evidence being found. The Commissioner advertises for a new officer and Sergeant Hooper is shocked at his choice of Marlon Pryce whom he knows only too well. First appearance of Marlon Pryce (Tahj Miles)
75	3	"Lucky in Love"	Chris Foggin	James Hall & Helen Black	21 January 2021	7.87	8.80
A lottery winner, Cherry Jackson, is found dead in her garden by her visiting friend who herself is knocked unconscious by someone in the house. JP arrives with the friend's husband only to find out that the body has disappeared. Parker suspects the victim's husband who has an alibi provided by his pregnant lover. When the body of Jackson is found at sea in a fishing net the only clue is a shoelace in the pocket. It's the anniversary of the death of Florence's fiancée and JP's wife's pregnancy is a week overdue.
76	4	"Chain Reaction"	Chris Foggin	Dan Muirden	28 January 2021	8.07	8.79
DI Parker is admitted to hospital after having a severe allergic reaction to a sandfly bite. While in hospital a nurse working in his ward apparently commits suicide with a drug overdose during the night in a locked room. Parker, though unwell, is not convinced it was suicide, and investigates, with his suspects the doctor, the patients with him in the ward, the nurse's brother who is due to inherit a legacy from a dying patient in the bed opposite Parker, and the brother's ex-girlfriend. A misplaced breakfast and an annoying frog outside the hospital croaking through a vent give him the answer.
77	5	"Music To My Ears"	Jordan Hogg	James Hall	4 February 2021	8.38	9.18
Concert Pianist Pasha Verdinikov is shot dead, while composing in his piano room. However all the suspects - Pasha's wife, Grace, their gardener, Delford, Pasha's son, Joseph, and their housekeeper, Maggie - alibi each other. The initials "A.S", found wiped in blood on a piano stool, are an important clue and lead to Aidan Shawcross, who supposedly died in a road accident two decades earlier and who had a one night stand with Grace; yet his fingerprints are on the gun that killed Pasha. The case necessitates DS Cassell going to London. Catherine, who knows the family, is attacked in her own home. Commissioner Patterson calls her daughter Camille serving in the Paris police and was a DS at St Marie. Guest appearance of DS Camille Bordey (Sara Martins)
78	6	"Fake or Fortune"	Jordan Hogg	James Hall	5 February 2021	8.62	9.35
Catherine from her hospital bed tells Neville she spoke to Pasha at the harbour. Following that lead takes the team, DS Camille Bordey standing in for Cassell, to the neighbouring island of Sainte Hélène and a hospice with the bedridden Aidan Shawcross dying of cancer; leaving the problem, who was buried 20 years ago killed by Pasha and Aidan to fake Aidan's death. Identifying the body will explain the murder of Pasha and a microwave explains the how. Things take a turn for the worse for Catherine in hospital which Camille finds difficult to handle, and she hallucinates DI Richard Poole who was murdered on the island. Guest appearance of DS Camille Bordey (Sara Martins) Cameo appearance of DI Richard Poole (Ben Miller)
79	7	"Somewhere in Time"	Toby Frow	Tom Nash	12 February 2021	7.75	8.37
Skip Marsden is found with his dinghy on a beach with a harpoon in his chest 11 miles from where his boat was moored at sea by a buoy with four well-to-do drunken stag party members, one a spoiled young viscount soon to be married, on board. Parker and the team have to determine how Marsden ended up on the beach when his dinghy was inoperable and GPS confirmed his boat had never moved. Another problem was Marsden had dog hairs in his throat from his dog that had died two months previously. The discovery that Marsden was a drug smuggler using the fixed buoy as a drug drop complicated the crime further and a fifth person was interested in the whereabouts of the drugs. Broadcast on Friday, as opposed to Thursday, due to an FA Cup fixture.
80	8	"I'll Never Let You Go"	Toby Frow	Julie Dixon	18 February 2021	8.19	8.77
Emmet Peterson staggers into the police station wearing a bloodstained shirt, carrying a pistol and believing that he has shot dead his best friend, businesswoman, Gardenia Dujon. Parker has his doubts after finding a crayon at the scene of the crime. Delving into Dujon's past leads to the death of her young son 15 years previously and also to blackmailer, Tarone Vincent, that her paranoid husband and 21 year old daughter only knew as a former employee. Blue varnish on the finger guard of the pistol and pictures taken at the crime scene give Parker the answer. Sergeant Hooper accepts a promotion, but a cloud hangs over the team when Trainee Officer Pryce is provoked into assaulting Vincent. Catherine prods Parker to take action regarding his feelings for Florence. Final regular appearance of Sergeant JP Hooper (Tobi Bakare)

=== Christmas Special (2021) ===
No. overall	No. in series	Title	Directed by	Written by	Original release date	UK viewers (millions) 7 day	UK viewers (millions) 28 day
81	–	"Christmas in Paradise"	Ben Kellett	James Hall	26 December 2021	7.93	8.76
Phillip Carlton, a wealthy shipping magnate, is found dead on the beach at a Christmas party, apparently shooting himself. Things get stranger when a London cab driver, Colin Babcock, receives a Christmas card from Saint Marie claiming Carlton was murdered. This prompts Commissioner Patterson to order Detective Parker, who was about to return home to Manchester for Christmas, to investigate the family. The Commissioner also recruits retired officer Dwayne Myers to assist while Detective Sergeant Cassell is away spending time with her family. Suspects include Carlton's wife, her lover, his former wife, Carlton's daughter, and his long term employee Bruce Garrett. Things are complicated when Colin Babcock turns up in Saint Marie with the Christmas card and an attempt on his life is made. While on a video call to Florence, Neville asks her out but the computer screen freezes, which prevents him from seeing her reaction. Guest appearance of Officer Dwayne Myers (Danny John-Jules)

=== Series 11 (2022) ===
No. overall	No. in series	Title	Directed by	Written by	Original release date	UK viewers (millions) 7 day	UK viewers (millions) 28 day
82	1	"Last Call to Honoré"	Jennie Paddon	Robert Thorogood	7 January 2022	8.25	9.19
Gabriel Taylor is found dead, stabbed, by a telephone box in the middle of nowhere. Parker and the team discover it was the last stage of an elaborate hostage scheme. Taylor's daughter had been kidnapped and he had followed the kidnappers' instructions to the letter and his daughter was released. The phone box was the location for the final confirmation of her release after dropping off the money. Parker has to delve into the family history of a deeply religious father, a mother who was a drug user and served a prison term, a daughter and her boyfriend who was disliked by the parents, and from the mother's past a just, after 10 years, released prisoner who was her boyfriend and drug dealer and blames Taylor for his imprisonment. Florence tells Neville she cares for him but wants to be just good friends. After the mystery has been solved the team is shocked by the news that one of the innocent suspects, Otis, has been shot dead in Jamaica. First appearance of Sergeant Naomi Thomas (Shantol Jackson)
83	2	"A Double Bogey"	Jennie Paddon	Kevin Rundle & James Hall	14 January 2022	7.66	8.78
Bradley Faircroft, brother to Connor Faircroft visits him on St. Marie. Connor, his wife Holly, and their son Jake own a golf course with islander Desreta as the head. Desreta overhears Connor and Bradley fighting, and Holly later receives a phone call from Bradley where he at first talks about Connor, then starts talking to Connor - begging him to put something down before clearly being hit multiple times. Holly and Jake rush out to find Bradley struck over the head, and when the police arrive they find a bloodied golf club in Connor's locked locker. However, Connor was caught on CCTV throughout the entire phone call, so who actually killed Bradley Faircroft and is framing his brother? Meanwhile, Neville is finding it difficult to keep a good working relationship with Florence after they agree to stay friends causing him to postpone Naomi's induction and Naomi also discovers Marlon is a young offender. Florence is also considered for an undercover mission to discover who killed Otis.
84	3	"Death in Flight"	Leon Lopez	Ian Jarvis	21 January 2022	7.81	8.68
High-profile media influencer Zach Ogilvy organises a group parachute jump to welcome new company member Alessa. Zach insists on jumping over a point with high wind risk, but ends up jumping by himself after the others refuse to take the chance. They jump safely back to base, then call the police when Zach doesn't reply when they call him. A honeymoon couple sees his body in a tree - stabbed to death. With him being too high from the ground for any murderer to reach, and a video catching Zach jumping from the plane, then the only apparent possibility is that he was stabbed in mid-air and so the sky becomes their crime scene. Meanwhile, Florence is chosen to go undercover looking after the daughter of Miranda Priestley, the leader of a drug operation. However, she is scared to take it, her fear stemming from the one place she never wanted to return - to where she was shot.
85	4	"Undercover and Out"	Leon Lopez	James Hall & Robert Thorogood	28 January 2022	7.55	8.41
Florence has successfully infiltrated the inner circle of Miranda Priestley (Victoria Ekanoye) by posing as Celeste, a babysitter for the young Dolores. Unexpectedly, Miranda arranges for them, along with Miranda's sister Karin, to return to St Marie and visit a man named Harley Joseph. Florence witnesses Miranda and Harley arguing and then is woken by a gunshot during the night but is confronted by Miranda and told to get back to bed. The next day Harley is found dead and the team is forced to investigate while not breaking Florence's cover. Final regular appearance of DS Florence Cassell (Joséphine Jobert)
86	5	"Painkiller Thriller"	Toby Frow	Asher Pirie & James Hall	4 February 2022	7.36	8.31
Ayana (Olivia d'Lima) is a famous singer and former drug addict, now clean and in rehab. Ayana is found dead in her room after having an allergic reaction to aspirin which had been given to her instead of her usual medication. Darlene Curtis, Dwayne's ex-girlfriend and friend of Selwyn's, is revealed to be the one who supposedly mixed up the meds despite aspirin not being handed out. Not believing Darlene killed Ayana, the team looks to the other suspects: her mother, her doctor, other patients and her mysterious stalker. Meanwhile, Neville's sister Izzy (Kate O'Flynn) makes a surprise visit to the island and Naomi is temporarily promoted to DS after Florence's departure, but wonders what would happen if she could stay DS permanently. Return (as a regular character) of Darlene Curtis (Ginny Holder)
87	6	"Phone-In Murder"	Toby Frow	Emma Goodwin	11 February 2022	7.15	8.01
A group of people, including Eve Wilding, are visiting St Marie to scatter the ashes of their friend. While at the hotel, Eve goes outside and phones the police, reporting a murder. When Neville and the team arrive they find Eve strangled and dumped in the pool, Naomi is able to resuscitate her although she remains unconscious. The team are left wondering whose murder she was attempting to report and what happened as the only way to reach the pool was through the room, and the suspects never left each other's sight. Meanwhile, Neville is still annoyed with his sister Izzy's presence on the island and Darlene becomes distracted by someone not having their wedding table toppers being delivered, but discovers something which may blow the case wide open.
88	7	"Murdering Lyrical"	Ruth Carney	Jillian Mannion	18 February 2022	7.36	8.16
A reggae rap star 'T' or Trenton Isaac is putting on a show in St Marie, his support act Deshawn is onstage when he notices someone backstage, the person pulls out a gun and turns off the lights. When the lights come back on, Trenton has been shot in the head with surprising accuracy. The mysterious figure is soon identified and known to have an accomplice, Marlon is shocked when he finds out that they were one of his old friends. Meanwhile, Neville struggles with Izzy's decision to have the baby on Saint Marie without telling the father she's pregnant and asks Catherine to help her.
89	8	"Death of a Pawn"	Ruth Carney	James Hall	25 February 2022	7.08	7.89
A famous chess player, who mysteriously dropped out of chess several year prior, is murdered on his returning chess match in front of a crowd. The group are pressured by the publicity of the situation. Possible suspects include the arbiter, the opposing player, a close friend, and a journalist. The journalist happens to be Commissioner Patterson's ex-wife, Maggie Harper (Orla Brady), and reveals a secret that will change his life forever. Neville also tries online dating.

=== Christmas Special 2022 ===
No. overall	No. in series	Title	Directed by	Written by	Original release date	UK viewers (millions) 7 day
90	–	"The Death Ghost"	Ruth Carney	James Hall	26 December 2022	7.82
When a true crime writer comes to work on a missing child case that was one of the commissioner's first assignments as a police officer, she is found dead in the swamp where the child vanished, and a recording suggests that she was killed by the missing boy's ghost. Meanwhile, Neville faces a lonely Christmas when his sister gives birth and their mother goes to her rather than coming to the island. Due to their luggage being mixed up, Neville meets Sophie Chambers (Chelsea Edge), an English tourist to the island.

=== Series 12 (2023) ===
No. overall	No. in series	Title	Directed by	Written by	Original release date	UK viewers (millions) 7 day
91	1	"Murder in the Stars"	Declan Recks	Ian Jarvis	6 January 2023	7.70
As a group of astronomers witness a rare stellar event on a cliff, one of the group falls to his death while they're watching the moment through their telescopes. The evidence suggests suicide, as the investigation reveals that the man was being accused of plagiarism of his most famous theory, but the discovery of a half-finished crossword puzzle in the dead man's pocket contradicts the idea that he planned to kill himself, leaving the detectives questioning how someone could have pushed the man over the cliff without anyone else hearing it.
92	2	"The Communal Death"	Declan Recks	Emma Goodwin & James Hall	13 January 2023	7.84
A member of a local preppers commune, Kit Martin, is poisoned in a locked bunker. No one else knew Martin was going to the bunker, and the camera did not show anyone entering until the team arrived, so suicide was a prevailing theory. The team find Raya West digging the grave of Luna Jones whom she had accidentally shot and killed. DI Neville Parker continues dating Sophie, including causing a jet ski accident. The murderer is revealed to be Charlie Banks, who passed a cup of coffee with cyanide down to Martin in a blind spot of the camera Banks installed. West is charged with manslaughter. The commissioner discourages Marlon Pryce from entering for the Sergeants exam as premature, but Pryce plans to proceed anyway because DS Naomi Thomas called him a wild card. Parker says goodbye to Sophie, while Justin West watches.
93	3	"Murder on the High Seas"	Steve Brett	Kit Lambert & James Hall	20 January 2023	7.32
Estate Agent Cheryl Horner is found dead on a boat after the other passengers had gone to land. The team quickly discover that Cheryl was a con artist with ties to each of the other passengers, however they all have air tight alibis. Neville misses Sophie, who has left the island, going on an obsessive cleaning spree. Marlon attempts to impress the Commissioner, so he won't have to study for exams, by stopping a cigarette smuggling ring. Neville seeks help from his old friend, detective Andy, who is struggling back in the UK. At the end of the episode, it's revealed he has arrived at Saint Marie with important news.
94	4	"An Unpleasant Homecoming"	Steve Brett	Katerina Watson	27 January 2023	7.28
Naomi returns to her home island of St Barnabas for her best friend's wedding, when the father of the bride wanders into the afterparty with a knife in his chest, accusing his ex-wife and mother of the bride. However, she is caught on video when the murder happened. The team goes to St Barnabas and teams up with the police force there to discover who in the wedding party is the killer. Meanwhile, back on Saint Marie, Catherine tries to help the Commissioner reconnect with his daughter.
95	5	"On the Sanctity of Children"	Leon Lopez	Tom Nash	3 February 2023	7.25
A celebration of a local children's home ends in tragedy when one of its most famous former residents is found dead. One of the staff claims responsibility, but the investigation soon reveals that the matter is not that simple. Meanwhile, the Commissioner's attempts to connect with his daughter prove complicated. Neville and Sophie resume their romance when she returns to the island to live with him for a month, but when they arrive at the Shack they find there has been an intruder.
96	6	"A Murder Forewarned — Part 1"	Angela de Chastelai Smith	Patrick Homes	10 February 2023	6.89
When Jake Dalton (Ben Tavassoli), a water taxi driver, is murdered just moments after Neville receives a letter warning him a murder is about to take place, evidence points towards criminologist David Cartwright, albeit circumstantial. As his emotions begin to get the better of him, Neville becomes frustrated and storms round to confront him, and just moments later, Cartwright is subsequently found stabbed to death. With only one clear explanation for how the murder was committed, the team have no choice but to arrest Neville - but does the beloved detective really have it in him to commit murder?
97	7	"Sins of the Detective — Part 2"	Angela de Chastelai Smith	James Hall	17 February 2023	7.10
DI Karen Flitcroft (Jaye Griffiths) is brought in to investigate Neville's involvement in the murder of David Cartwright, but the team are convinced of his innocence. Selwyn leads an investigation to find who the real killer might be, and uncovers a web of misdeeds, including the discovery of Justin West (Robert Webb) being the one who broke into Neville's home, and DC Andrew Buckley (Kent Riley) trying to escape investigation from the DPS by hiding out on Saint Marie. At the eleventh hour, incarcerated and facing trial, both Neville and the team finally work out the killer's identity.
98	8	"A Calypso Caramba"	Leon Lopez	James Hall & Lisa McMullin	24 February 2023	7.17
A murder is committed, apparently right under DI Parker's nose. Neville undergoes a crisis of confidence, built upon his previous failure to recognise Sophie's duplicity, and tells the commissioner he intends to leave. Neville visits Sophie in prison, where he asks if any of their relationship had been "real"; she says she never had romantic feelings for him but had come to like the character she pretended to be when she was with him, so in that sense he'd made her happy. This allows him enough closure to enable him to concentrate on the current case. Ultimately, Neville realises how the murder was carried out, and the team arrest the guilty party. Satisfied, Neville agrees to stay on Saint Marie. Note: This is the final episode of the 12th series ahead of the spin-off series, Beyond Paradise, broadcast on the same day.

=== Christmas Special 2023 ===
No. overall	No. in series	Title	Directed by	Written by	Original release date	UK viewers (millions) 7 day
99	–	"It's Behind You"	Steve Brett	James Hall	26 December 2023	6.61
Marketing manager Debbie Clumson (Bronagh Waugh) flies out to Saint Marie to spend Christmas with her employers, the wealthy Stableforth family. But no sooner than she has arrived, the head of the household, Gerald (Geoff Bell), dies after falling into a ravine in what appears to be a freak accident, and a short while later, Debbie disappears. With a complex case on their hands, and little evidence to suggest a motive for either crime, Neville is perplexed, while the arrival of his mum Melanie (Doon Mackichan) further complicates matters. Meanwhile, Marlon and Naomi share an unexpected kiss at the Commissioner's Christmas party.

=== Series 13 (2024) ===
No. overall	No. in series	Title	Directed by	Written by	Original release date	UK viewers (millions) 7 day
100	1	"Going Round in Circles"	Steve Hughes	Tom Nash and James Hall	4 February 2024	7.66
A celebration of fifty years police service takes an unexpected turn for Commissioner Patterson when he is shot at the local Yacht Club. Evidence initially points to an Alton Garvey, but despite a phone call from the man himself admitting to the crime, no motive is apparent. The only suspects are Jacqueline St Clair (Cathy Tyson), a lifelong friend of the Commissioner; her husband, who suspected her of having an affair, and Marlon Collins (Sean Maguire), the Yacht Club manager - an old adversary of the Saint Marie police force, a corrupt criminal. During this special episode, Catherine is seen alongside her daughter, Camille, who is giving birth, while Neville Parker and Marlon Pryce had skyped them to see if she knew about Marlon Collins' past after having several convictions. There is also a brief flashback to the series' first episode when Collins was arrested by DI Charlie Hulme and Sergeant Lily Thompson. Camille gives Neville a nudge, telling him to go for what he wants in life while he can. At the end, Neville opens one of his drawers and takes out a photo of DS Florence Cassell with her puppy. The scene confirms Neville still has feelings for Florence. Guest appearance of DS Camille Bordey (Sara Martins)
101	2	"Your Number's Up"	Steve Hughes	Patrick Homes	11 February 2024	7.43
The stabbing of former charity leader Nancy Martin (Hayley Mills) at a local retirement home leads Neville and the team into an extremely complex case, involving the thirty-year old theft of £5,000,000 from a violent British gang, and the disappearance of the man responsible. The only suspects are the victim's adopted daughter, her former PA and a "long lost cousin", Eloise Mirie (Juliet Cowan), who turns out to be a corrupt Flying Squad detective - but none appear to have had the opportunity to commit the crime. Meanwhile, the commissioner struggles to return to active duty after his shooting, and Darlene arranges a double date night for herself and Naomi.
102	3	"Serving Up Murder"	Angie de Chastelai Smith	Katerina Watson	18 February 2024	6.96
Famous chef Stanley Drake is poisoned and dies when talking to Andrina Harper Patterson, Selwyn's daughter, after a cooking competition which had showed various hopefuls who wanted to win the competition. The team, however, are left confounded when they realise that the victim didn't consume anything that day that the contestants hadn't consumed themselves. This eventually leads to 3 out of the 4 suspects being found to have plotted to murder Drake after he sexually assaulted all three of them in the past. During the episode, Catherine reunites with Lucky, an old friend in Saint Marie who abandoned her 30 years ago. Despite the estrangement, Catherine insists she would help Lucky and the others receive a lenient sentence. Selwyn is pleased when Andrina tells him she is writing an expose on Drake, designed to encourage other victims of his to come forward. Marlon tells Neville to 'nuke' his blog, but just as Neville is about to press delete, he gets his first like and comment from SunsetChaser, who Neville starts to talk to over social media. However, Marlon is concerned for him. Naomi tells Marlon about her karaoke night out with Darlene and another person.
103	4	"Murder Most Electric"	Angie de Chastelai Smith	James Cary and Patrick Homes	25 February 2024	7.30
After an island-wide blackout causes chaos in Honoré, Neville and the team investigate what caused it, leading them to a substation, where they discover the electrocuted body of Ellis Baxter, a former tech genius from the UK. During their investigations, they visit the computer repair shop where Ellis worked, which leads them to discover a secretly-hidden world of cryptocurrency. With cryptocurrency mining at the heart of the case, Neville realises that this was no accident. The only issue is the team's three likely suspects were together at the time of the blackout. So if Ellis was murdered, who was responsible?
104	5	"As the Sun Sets..."	Tracey Larcombe	James Hall	3 March 2024	7.01
Marlon receives a mysterious phone call from his old boss, who sounds badly injured as he begs him for help. It's a blast from his criminal past, and someone he's not spoken to since joining the police force. But when he hurries over to find out what's wrong, he is horrified to find his former boss lying dead - having been shot, the only witness to the incident being a parrot. Marlon is then knocked out by an unknown assailant. He becomes determined to solve the case, insistent that - although his former boss dabbled in criminality - he wasn't a 'bad guy'. But when the team uncovers two potential suspects, they find themselves at a stalemate: one suspect with every opportunity but no motive, and the other with every motive but a rock-solid alibi. Meanwhile, when his sister Jocelyn wins a scholarship but it is in Jamaica, Marlon feels obliged to move there with her. Wanting to continue in policing, he is disappointed to find there is currently no available position in the police force there. The Commissioner goes to Jamaica and is joined by Sergeant JP Hooper; together they manage to secure an immediate position for Marlon in the Jamaican police force. Neville's former girlfriend Zoe (Taj Atwal) surprises him by arriving on St Marie. Final appearance of Officer Marlon Pryce (Tahj Miles) Guest appearance of Sergeant JP Hooper (Tobi Bakare)
105	6	"Murder Going Down"	Tracey Larcombe	James Coleman	10 March 2024	7.35
At a swish (high-end) resort on the island of Saint Marie, Cora Blyth (Gabrielle Glaister) is celebrating with her husband Joe (John Gordon Sinclair) along with their daughter, Holly (Ellise Chappell) and her husband Sam. The next morning, Joe leaves Cora alive in a lift, and she arrives at the reception floor stabbed to death. A mysterious woman, Lexi Reece tries to enter the crime scene and is pursued by Darlene and Dwayne. To help with the increasing workload, the Commissioner introduces Officer Dwayne Myers back into the force, to a frosty reception from Darlene. Elsewhere in the episode, Neville talks to Zoe about the chance of them being back together before this is later dismissed as impossible. Neville plans to leave Saint Marie and find love, inspired by Zoe. After the team arrest Cora's killers and Holly finds her biological mother, Lexi (Ronni Ancona), Commissioner Patterson gets an unexpected phone call from Florence Cassell, who has been living on the neighbouring island of Saint Auguste under a witness protection scheme. She explains that she is out of witness protection after two years and is heading back to Saint Marie. Returns of Officer Dwayne Myers (Danny John-Jules) and DS Florence Cassell (Joséphine Jobert)
106	7	"A Tale of Two Islands"	Leon Lopez	James Hall	17 March 2024	7.26
A group of "friends", namely Amelia Templeton (Emma Sidi), Hugo Kingsley (Tyrone Huntley) and Barney Keats (Will Hislop), led by Cressida Dempsey, arrive at the Caribbean island of St Auguste for a holiday to capture moments for their online followers. Another guest, Abigail Warner (Eve Ponsonby), checks in alone and plans to confront her bullies and expose their true colours. However, things take a dark turn when she is found floating dead in the hotel pool. Florence, who had her witness protection status terminated just hours before Abigail's murder, is put in charge of the case in St Auguste, working with Dwayne and Darlene, while back in Saint Marie, Neville and Naomi are also working on the case.
107	8	"A Murder in the Skies"	Leon Lopez	James Hall	24 March 2024	7.47
While Neville planned to travel and look for his soulmate on a plane to Dominica, one of the passengers, Kurt Henderson (Calvin Demba), is murdered. DI Parker chooses to come back for one final case to solve while he comes to realization that Florence may be his true love and must get to the yacht she is scheduled to board before it's too late. Final appearances of DS Florence Cassell (Joséphine Jobert) and DI Neville Parker (Ralf Little)

=== Christmas Special 2024 ===
No. overall	No. in series	Title	Directed by	Written by	Original release date	UK viewers (millions) 7 day
108	–	"Christmas 2024"	Leon Lopez	James Hall	22 December 2024	7.22
A tourist dressed as Father Christmas (Santa Claus) is murdered at the hotel where he and his fiancée are staying, witnessed only by a young child from his hotel room window. The situation is complicated when another man dressed as Santa is killed by the same gun in his home, at seemingly the exact same time. A final man dressed as Santa Claus is shot at but survives, at the same time as well, and is sent into protection with an annoyed Dwayne, who wants to spend time with his father. Irate holidaying detective inspector Mervin Wilson is on an early plane home, when his superior calls instructing him to solve the case. Mervin is determined to leave Saint Marie as soon as possible and annoys the team with his 'rude' behaviour. First appearance of DI Mervin Wilson (Don Gilet) Final appearance of Officer Dwayne Myers (Danny John-Jules)

=== Series 14 (2025) ===
No. overall	No. in series	Title	Directed by	Written by	Original release date	UK viewers (millions) 7 day
109	1	"Episode 1"	Jennie Paddon	James Hall	31 January 2025	6.36
Dwayne's replacement police officer and JP's protégé, Benjamin Brice, is found dead on his first day of work in an assumed biking accident. Mervin happens to pass the crime scene while heading to the airport, and becomes intrigued by the case, especially when clues begin to point to murder. Darlene and Naomi clash with Mervin over his persistent complaints about life on Saint Marie. Mervin begins to believe his birth mother, who died in an accident shortly before his arrival on the island, was murdered, spurring him to stay on the island after the case is solved. JP has some bad news for the Commissioner. Guest appearance of Sergeant JP Hooper (Tobi Bakare)
110	2	"Episode 2"	Jennie Paddon	Tom Nash	7 February 2025	6.02
Darlene and Naomi rejoice in receiving a new Detective Inspector, only to learn Mervin has signed a three month contract. His first official case is the murder of a finalist on an English adventure game show, who is stabbed mid-zipwire while crossing the finishing line. Murdered rookie Benjamin Brice's replacement is officer Sebastian Rose, whose enthusiastic behavior irks Mervin. Meanwhile, Mervin attempts to secretly investigate his mother’s death, to the ire of the Commissioner. First appearance of Officer Sebastian Rose (Shaquille Ali-Yebuah)
111	3	"Episode 3"	Ian Aryeh	Sarah Deane	14 February 2025	6.03
A wellness business owner suffers an allergic reaction at the launch of her new skincare product, and Mervin suspects it was murder due to her precautions in place with the food and drink. Darlene is annoyed with Sebastian after he fails his first few jobs of shutting down a party and going undercover to buy drugs. The Commissioner struggles with the information of new budget cuts, and the possible removal of his job. Mervin, now with the aid of Naomi, investigates his mother's death.
112	4	"Episode 4"	Ian Aryeh	Patrick Homes and James Hall	21 February 2025	6.06
While negotiating the sale of the local distillery, the current owner is fatally poisoned while the other three – his sister, the new owner, and her son, are also poisoned non-fatally. Mervin recognizes the victim as having placed a silent phone call to him several days prior, and begins to suspect he was murdered. Meanwhile, Mervin – disillusioned after finding proof his mother's death was an accident – buys an air conditioner to spend his free time watching Match of the Day, causing Naomi to try and show him his mother’s favorite restaurant. Sebastian teams with Catherine to try and save the Commissioner's job.
113	5	"Episode 5"	Carys Lewis	Joe Ainsworth	28 February 2025	5.79
Mervin joins the rest of the team for a women's football match, which takes a deadly turn when a player is found shot dead in the changing rooms. However, with the room only accessible from the pitch, the team are confused as to how the killer could've got in as they themselves didn't see anyone enter. Meanwhile, Naomi is surprised to find the referee for the game is her ex-boyfriend, and Mervin reopens the investigation into his mother's death after discovering new evidence.
114	6	"Episode 6"	Carys Lewis	James Hall	7 March 2025	5.83
A British woman arrives on the island for the first time to meet a man she met online in person, but, on arriving at his villa, finds him shot dead. The team attempt to solve the case while also dealing with the arrival of the Commissioner's replacement, Sterling Fox, who makes a less than favourable first impression as his predecessor contemplates his impending retirement.
115	7	"Episode 7"	John Maidens	James Hall	14 March 2025	5.75
Mervin makes a breakthrough in the investigation into his mother's death when he finally finds a potential suspect, but is still at a loss to how the possible murder was committed. With little progress made, Fox pulls rank and shuts down the investigation, leading his predecessor to dramatically emerge from retirement to help the team out.
116	8	"Episode 8"	John Maidens	James Coleman and Alexandra Carruthers	28 March 2025	5.92
Just as Mervin is finally about to leave Saint Marie, he himself is implicated in a case when a body is found in the empty and locked shack. He is quickly cleared to lead the investigation, but the team are at a loss as to how anyone could've gained entry to the shack, let alone committed murder in it. Meanwhile, the Commissioner receives some good news, but his response to it surprises his friends, while Mervin is forced to reconsider leaving the island after another bombshell. Aired two weeks later due to Comic Relief.

=== Christmas Special 2025 ===
No. overall	No. in series	Title	Directed by	Written by	Original release date	UK viewers (millions) 7 day
117	–	"Christmas 2025"	Jennie Paddon	James Hall	28 December 2025	6.1
A man is found shot dead in a villa rented by a holidaying British company, all of whom claim not to know him. Mervin soon discovers that the man was in contact with the woman who stole money from the company, and this all began in the UK. The newly retired Commissioner Patterson, visiting his daughter in the UK, is recruited to investigate the company and bonds with the receptionist after train delays leave him stranded on Christmas. Mervin also contends with the expectation of taking Patterson's place in Christmas traditions, such as the Nativity play, and the lack of contact from his newly discovered brother. Final appearance of Officer Darlene Curtis (Ginny Holder)

=== Series 15 (2026) ===
No. overall	No. in series	Title	Directed by	Written by	Original release date	UK viewers (millions) 7 day
118	1	"Episode 1"	John Maidens	James Hall	30 January 2026	5.65
Commissioner Patterson's return to Saint Marie is overshadowed by a suspicious death at Government House, where a man has fallen from the roof. While it initially appears to be a suicide, Mervin suspects foul play. First appearance of Sergeant Mattie Fletcher (Catherine Garton)
119	2	"Episode 2"	Ian Aryeh	James Hall & Poz Watson	6 February 2026	5.31
In this episode, DI Wilson is called to investigate a suspicious death at an exclusive couples therapy retreat. The victim is a therapist who is found drowned at sea during her evening swim. What initially looks like a tragic accident quickly turns darker when fingermarks are discovered on her neck, confirming foul play.
120	3	"Episode 3"	John Maidens	Ben Weatherill	16 February 2026	4.83
An enigmatic recluse is shot to death in his home, with the team landing on a clear suspect, despite a perfect alibi. Meanwhile, Mervin struggles to gel with the Commissioner's community outreach initiative. Broadcast on the following Monday, as opposed to Friday, due to an FA Cup fixture. However this episode was still uploaded to BBC iPlayer on Friday 13 February making it available online before the episode's terrestrial airing
121	4	"Episode 4"	Ian Aryeh	James Hall & Colin Bytheway	20 February 2026	5.08
An apparently accidental death at St. Vincent's Church is found to be murder, despite the fact that all the doors were locked from the inside. Personal complications arise, as Seb is well acquainted with all the suspects, including his own mother, the church pastor.
122	5	"Episode 5"	Jamie Annett	James Hall & Ian Jarvis	27 February 2026	5.06
A touring theatre company's final show is cut short when one of the actors drops dead in the middle of the performance. He was somehow poisoned, in spite of his co-stars having drunk from the same tainted bottle to no ill-effect. Mervin tries to regain contact with Solomon.
123	6	"Episode 6"	Jamie Annett	Alexandra Carruthers	9 March 2026	4.91
Mervin goes missing, after having gone on leave to see Solomon in Antigua. The team search for him, as he awakens to find himself held captive. Broadcast on the following Monday, as opposed to Friday, due to an FA Cup fixture. However this episode was still uploaded to BBC iPlayer on Friday 6 March making it available online before the episode's terrestrial airing
124	7	"Episode 7"	Jeannie Paddon	Alexandra Carruthers & Robin French	13 March 2026	5.07
Hortense LeRoux, an infamous agony aunt on the verge of retirement, is found poisoned via a contaminated paper. Meanwhile, Mervin struggles to come to terms with the aftermath of his trip to Antigua.
125	8	"Episode 8"	Jeannie Paddon	James Hall & Emma David-Edwards	27 March 2026	5.18
A death at sea with unexplained injuries stirs rumours about a legendary monster of the Caribbean, the Lusca. Meanwhile, Mervin is blindsided by an unexpected young visitor. Aired two weeks later due to Comic Relief.
