= Frank Fitzpatrick =

American songwriter

- Born: Francis Edward Fitzpatrick; April 13, 1961 (age 65); Detroit, Michigan, U.S.
- Genres: Soundtracks; rhythm and blues; soul; jazz; hip hop; pop
- Years active: 1980–present
- Website: frankfitzpatrick.com

Francis Edward Fitzpatrick (born April 13, 1961), more commonly known as Frank Fitzpatrick, is an American composer, music producer, author, wellness expert, filmmaker and social entrepreneur.

Fitzpatrick is best known for his career in the entertainment industry as a songwriter, record producer, soundtrack composer and filmmaker. He is also the founder of the non-profit organization EarthTones.

== Early life ==
Fitzpatrick was born in Detroit, Michigan and graduated from the University of Michigan's music and business schools in 1983. While there, he worked for Eclipse Jazz, a student-run body striving for better exposure of jazz artists through the production of live shows in the Ann Arbor area.

== Career ==
=== Early career ===
Fitzpatrick relocated to Los Angeles in 1983 to work for record producer Richard Perry of Planet Records. He started working as a music editor for television in 1984, initially as a supervising music editor on the series Alvin and the Chipmunks and Crime Story, among others.

Fitzpatrick later expanded into film music by working as a music editor for the film composer Georges Delerue, going on to co-produce an orchestral retrospective of Delerue's film scores in 1991, The London Sessions, which included a track co-written by Fitzpatrick and performed by Carl Anderson entitled "Between You and Me."

=== Soundtracks ===
In the '90s, Fitzpatrick began working as a film composer, music supervisor and executive music producer in Hollywood.

The first film score he is credited for is that of Nuns on the Run, the 1990 comedy featuring Eric Idle and Robbie Coltrane. Further contributions in the 90s included soundtracks for the films Friday, Pirates of Silicon Valley and In Too Deep, as well as working as the composer and music director for The Larry Sanders Show.

In 2021, Ingrooves/Universal, in association with HBO, released an album of his music from the show performed by The Larry Sanders Show Band.

From 2000-2020, Fitzpatrick continued to create soundtracks for films, including Queen of the Damned (2002),Scary Movie 3 (2003),Jump In!,The Proud Family Movie, and Bring It On: Worldwide Cheersmack. In association with Hollywood Elite Composers, Ingrooves/Universal released a compilation tribute album commemorating Fitzpatrick’s 30 years as a film composer entitled Original Scores by Frank Fitzpatrick.

In 2022, in celebration of the 25th Anniversary of the original Friday film, EnVisage Entertainment and Ingrooves/Universal released Fitzpatrick’s previously unreleased original score to the film. The score featured his band Hidden Faces.

=== Songwriter and music producer ===
In 2008, Fitzpatrick wrote the Grammy-nominated song “Soul Music,” performed by Anthony Hamilton and selected in the category “Best Traditional R&B Vocal Performance for the 52nd Annual Grammy Awards” The song was the title track for the film Soul Men.

In 2010, in partnership with Terry McBride, Fitzpatrick produced Yoga Revolution, a compilation CD to promote yoga and meditation programs in schools. The album featured recordings from Sheryl Crow and Sting, among others.

His 2017 single “Call On Me” and music video from Universal’s film Bring It On: Worldwide were part of a non-profit initiative to promote music and arts for schools.

His 2018 single “Stronger Than Pride” was the theme song for Love Jacked, a film distributed by Netflix.

In 2019, Fitzpatrick released a 20th Anniversary Edition of his 1999 solo piano album entitled New Standards, which included a piano version of “Stronger Than Pride” as well as a book of original sheet music under the same title.

=== Filmmaker ===
In 2001, Fitzpatrick directed and produced the short film Jungle Jazz: Public Enemy #1, which premiered at the 2001 Berlin International Film Festival, winning The Silver Bear Award for best Short Film. The film won additional awards in Sydney, São Paulo, Belo Horizonte, Kansas City and Santa Cruz. In 2007, Fitzpatrick completed his first animated short film The Rebel Angel.

The majority of his film work has come through music videos. Amongst his work are the 2011 videos “Hip Hop Nation” (featuring recording artists KRS-One and K’naan) and “Express Yourself” (featuring Nneka and Ziggy Marley).

In 2018, Frank was an executive producer for the romantic comedy Love Jacked.

=== Music, Health & Technology ===
In 2011, Fitzpatrick attended the Executive Program at Singularity University. The following year, he helped facilitate Singularity University's inaugural Hollywood Executive Program. In 2014, he joined the faculty of Exponential Medicine at the university, an annual conference discussing the implications of breakthrough technologies on healthcare. In 2017 and 2019 he was a speaker at the conference, presenting as an expert on music and health.

In 2020, Fitzpatrick joined the Sound Health Network, a collaboration between the NEA, UCSF, the NIH and the Kennedy Center. He started writing an ongoing series of articles on the convergence of sound, music, health and technology as a contributing writer for Forbes.

In 2021, he expanded his writing to include blogs and articles for Thrive Global and ExO Insights, and published the book Amplified, with a foreword by Daniel Levitin, author of “This is Your Brain On Music”. The same year, Fitzpatrick presented to leaders in business, health and exponential technology at Singularity University Australia Summit and as a Music and Health expert for public news programs including Fox and iHeart Radio.

In 2022, Fitzpatrick joined Apple as a Music and Health Specialist.

== Philanthropy and social entrepreneurship ==
=== EarthTones ===
Fitzpatrick as the founder of EarthTones, a non-profit arts organization, has created a number of initiatives and partnerships serving youth through music, education and wellbeing.

In 2012, EarthTones launched the WHY Music project, an initiative to provide people with a way to best utilize the benefits of music in all the areas of their lives. WHY Music began with a series of articles in the Huffington Post, and expanded to include a series of live talks, round tables, and workshops. That year, EarthTones partnered with City of Hope to launch Yoga For Hope in Los Angeles, in support of people dealing with life-threatening diseases. In 2013, Fitzpatrick was nominated as a Gifted Citizen from the Ciudad de las Ideas for the WHY Music project's potential to positively impact over 10 million lives. The project later expanded further with a program tailored for schools.

In 2016, Fitzpatrick collaborated with humanitarian photographer Lisa Kristine to create the video "A Prayer for Freedom", part of the End Slavery Campaign initiated by Pope Francis and a coalition of spiritual leaders from around the world. The video premiered at the Vatican in Rome, the House of Lords in Westminster, and at the opening of the Enslaved Exhibition at the National Underground Railroad Freedom Center in Ohio.

=== Social entrepreneurship ===
Along with Director of Pepperdine's Center for Media and Entertainment, Craig Detweiler, Fitzpatrick created and hosted the 2014 International Forum Education: Disrupted at Pepperdine University.

Fitzpatrick has been invited as a delegate to the 2012 Skoll World Forum for Social Entrepreneurs, the 2014 UK Arts and Humanities Research Council’s forum on Video Games, Music Creativity and Education, and the 2017 Novus Summit at the United Nations. He has also been a keynote speaker at the TEDx and Esalen.

In 2021, he joined Singularity University Australia as part of their expert faculty.

== Author ==
Since 2012, Fitzpatrick has written for a number of publications and online forums, including LA Yoga,Forbes and ExO Insight.

In 2021, he published the non-fiction book entitled Amplified: Unleash Your Potential Through the Power of Music.

== Bibliography ==
- Fitzpatrick, F. (2020). New Standards: Ballads for Solo Piano. Independently Published. ISBN 979-8610981376
- Fitzpatrick, F. (2021). Amplified: Unleash Your Potential Through the Power of Music. Amplified Media.ISBN 978-1737103417
