= Bring It On: Cheer or Die =

2022 film by Karen Lam

- Promotional poster
- Directed by: Karen Lam
- Screenplay by: Rebekah McKendry; Dana Schwartz
- Story by: Alyson Fouse
- Produced by: Griff Furst
- Starring: Kerri Medders; Tiera Skovbye; Missi Pyle
- Cinematography: Adam Swica
- Edited by: Lara Mazur; Eric Potter
- Music by: Patric Caird
- Production companies: Universal 1440 Entertainment; Beacon Pictures; Curmudegon Films
- Distributed by: Universal Pictures Home Entertainment
- Release date: September 27, 2022
- Running time: 91 minutes
- Country: United States
- Language: English

Bring It On: Cheer or Die is a 2022 American slasher comedy film directed by Karen Lam. The film stars Kerri Medders, Tiera Skovbye, and Missi Pyle. It is the seventh and final installment of the Bring It On series of cheerleading films, following Bring It On: Worldwide Cheersmack (2017).

The film differs from its predecessors in that it partially ditches the series' usual comedic tone and incorporates more horror elements, although its final rating was PG-13. It was released on DVD and digitally on September 27, 2022, by Universal Pictures Home Entertainment, ahead of its television premiere on Syfy on October 8. The film received negative reviews.

== Synopsis ==
When Abby and her Diablos teammates are forbidden from doing any risky cheer stunts by their overly cautious school, they fear that they will be laughed out of the upcoming regional cheer competition. The squad comes up with a plan to choreograph a winning routine in secret at a nearby abandoned school. Once at the school to rehearse, one by one, the cheerleaders begin to disappear. By the time they realize they are locked inside together with a killer, it may be too late for any of them to survive.

== Cast ==
- Kerri Medders as Abby Synger
- Tiera Skovbye as McKayla Miller
- Missi Pyle as Principal Simmons
- Megan Best as Sandra Pollack / young Simmons
- Alten Wilmot as Mateo Adamos
- Alexandra Beaton as Regan Winters
- Sierra Holder as Jackie Braun
- Sam Robert Muik as Quincy
- Alec Carlos as Danny Jeffries
- Marlowe Zimmerman as Paige Simmons
- Makena Zimmerman as Evee Simmons
- Callista Begin as Paige / Evee Simmons (age 12)
- Scarlett Smith as Paige / Evee Simmons (age 5)
- Erika Prevost as Tori Vince
- Madison MacIsaac as Sydney
- Rudy Borgonia as Silent Stu
- Samuel Braun as Scott Becker
- Shannon Guile as Diablo Mascot
- Jared Khalifa as Diablo Mascot / Cheerleader
- Gino Anania as Evan Wolf
- Aidan Ritchie as Grunchy Bus Driver
- Robert Allen as Football Coach
- Jahron Wilson as Skeleton
- Cassandra Potenza as Captain Becca
- Sara Angelica as Larissa
- Jerni Stewart as Candace

== Production ==
The film was first announced by Syfy on May 14, 2021, with its official title being revealed on December 16. Filming took place in Winnipeg, Canada, during the COVID-19 pandemic.

== Reception ==
Reception towards Bring It On: Cheer or Die was largely negative. On the review aggregator website Rotten Tomatoes, the film holds an approval rating of 11% based on 9 reviews, with an average rating of 3.4/10.

Spooky Sarah Says gave it 2.5 out of 5, stating that "it is a popcorn-type film to watch in a time when most horror is so heavily centered around trauma and grief". Paul Lê of Bloody Disgusting awarded the movie 1.5 skulls out of 5, praising its premise and some of its stunt work, but criticizing the acting, as well as both its comedy and slasher elements, which he described as lacking due to the PG-13 rating. He concluded the review by saying, "This oddball sequel struggles to find a balance between its roots and its vision, only causing the movie to have no real identity in the end". Independent critic Josh Batchelder gave the film 1 of 5 stars, describing the script as "desperate for a laugh" and criticizing the "overuse of slo-mo". Barbara Shulgasser-Parker of Common Sense Media gave it a two-star review.

Donatobom on IGN awarded the movie a 3/10 and described it as "not to their liking", stating that it was painfully disappointing and "deflated quicker than Pennywise's balloons against a rocket launcher explosion". In a mixed review, Chris Catt from Creepy Catalog described the film as "not a very good movie", citing its lack of blood and speculating that it was meant as an attempt to revive a franchise that was "fading away". However, he ended the review by stating that he "did kind of enjoy" the film despite its flaws. In a more optimistic review, Melis Amber of Geek Girl Authority described the movie as "the OK kind of terrible", praising its climax and campy dialogue, but criticizing its "sluggish middle".
