= Alexandra Beaton =

Canadian actress and dancer

- Born: 1994/12/05
- Education: University of Guelph
- Occupation: Actress
- Years active: 2006–present
- Television: The Next Step

Alexandra Beaton (born December 5, 1994) is a Canadian actress. She is known for starring as Emily on the Canadian teen drama series The Next Step during its first seven seasons.

== Early life ==
Beaton's mother is Kate Wheeler, an anchor for CTV Newsnet; her father is a businessman. She grew up near Claremont, Ontario, and has a younger sister, Sophie. She has stated that ever since a young age, she "knew" she wanted to be a performer, and began ballet classes at the age of two, and acting at five years old. Beaton studied political science at the University of Guelph, and noted that the course made her "think more critically".

== Career ==
Beaton made her professional acting debut in the 2006 film 300, and subsequently appeared in various television advertisements. In 2013, Beaton was cast in the Family Channel series The Next Step as Emily. Beaton has described Emily as a "a bit of a mean girl", and noted Emily is "more confrontational" than herself in real life. Beaton was the only cast member with extensive acting experience prior to appearing in the series, and she has stated that she prefers acting scenes to dancing scenes on the series. In 2017, Beaton starred as Emma in a web series Spiral, alongside The Next Step co-star Brennan Clost. In 2019, she starred as Cassie in the Lifetime television film The Cheerleader Escort. In 2022, Beaton starred as one of the cheerleaders in the Universal horror film Bring It On: Cheer or Die, the seventh installment in the Bring It On film series. In 2025 she starred in series Overcompensating as Bridget. In 2026 she starred in Finding her edge as Elise Russo. Both series have been renewed.

== Filmography ==
=== Film roles ===
Year	Title	Role	Notes
2006	300	Burned Village Child	
2019	The Cheerleader Escort	Cassie Talbot	Television film
2021	Single All the Way	Sofia	
2022	Bring It On: Cheer or Die	Regan Winters	Direct-to-video film
2022	Luckiest Girl Alive	Hilary	

=== Television roles ===
Year	Title	Role	Notes
2013–2020, 2025	The Next Step	Emily	Main role; 131 episodes
2019	Good Witch	Ella	Episode: "The Road Trip"
2020	For the Record	Madison	Episode: "The Broken Hearts Tour"
2020	The Hardy Boys	Emma	Episodes: "Welcome to Your Life", "Secrets and Lies"
2023	Ride	Janine Hickson	3 episodes
2025	Overcompensating	Bridget	recurring role; 5 episodes
2026	Finding Her Edge	Elise Russo	Main cast

=== Web series ===
Year	Title	Role	Notes
2017	Spiral	Emma	Main role
