= Florence Cassell =

Fictional character from the television series Death in Paradise

- Death in Paradise character
- Joséphine Jobert as Florence Cassell
- First appearance: Series 4, Episode 1
- Last appearance: Series 13, Episode 8
- Portrayed by: Joséphine Jobert

In-universe information
- Occupation: Detective Sergeant
- Spouses: Patrice Campbell (fiancé; deceased)
- Relatives: 5 unnamed brothers
- Years: 2015–2019, 2021–2022, 2024

Detective Sergeant Florence Cassell is a character in the crime drama television series Death in Paradise, portrayed by Joséphine Jobert.

== Background ==
Florence was raised by her mother and father in Jamaica with five brothers. At 27 years old, Florence, applied to work as a police officer (later accepted), was introduced in series 4 as a replacement officer for Fidel Best, who was in the first three series. She was a police officer for the first half of the season before being promoted to Detective Sergeant in the wake of DS Camille Bordey's, actress Sara Martins, departure.

== 2015 to 2022 (original run) ==
From series 4 to 6 she worked alongside DI Humphrey Goodman before he left to go to London with his fiancée Martha Lloyd. The new detective, DI Jack Mooney, was introduced by Florence to the rest of the team after helping Humphrey in the case that took place in London. She has a relationship with Patrice Campbell who later becomes her fiancé. This eventually leads to Florence's first exit after he is murdered and she barely survives as she leaves Saint Marie. Her actress Joséphine Jobert furthermore went on to say she needed to leave the show for a short break for personal and professional reasons. It was confirmed that she would be replaced by DI Dumas, who would feature in the series from the end of series 8 to all of series 9.

Florence returns in series 10 to Saint Marie and is given her old job back by the commissioner, Selwyn Patterson, after Madeleine Dumas' exit with his niece, Ruby. She meets Neville Parker, portrayed by Ralf Little, in an awkward encounter. During the whole of series 10, Neville has had feelings for Florence and eventually asked her if she wanted to go out with him. In the 2021 Christmas Special the answer is revealed.

In the 11th series Florence is offered an undercover job and her first mission was to catch mafia boss Miranda Priestley, who was assumed to be under a drugs organisation. Neville and the team join forces with her when a murder occurs that involves Miranda. Desperately, Florence tries to get as much information as possible without being suspicious to solve the murder and finally catch Miranda and her gang. In the fourth episode, Miranda holds Florence at gunpoint and exposes her being undercover. A gunshot is heard not far away from the police station as Neville, Marlon, Naomi and Darlene rush to save her before it's too late. Upon arrival, Florence survived and pulled a firearm at the final moment. She left the island once more to go into witness protection after her near–death experience. Her exit came as a shock to viewers.

== 2024 guest appearances ==
In May 2023, in a reaction to a post on the official Death in Paradise Instagram page about series 13 filming, Jobert hinted a likely return. She rejoined the cast in 2024, at the end of episode six, right before the end credits.

In the following episode, it was confirmed that Florence's witness protection status was terminated and she was able to go back to her normal life again. She reunites with Dwayne and Darlene on the beach as she is hired to solve a complex case on St Auguste. Meanwhile, Neville and Naomi work on the case back in Saint Marie. Neville is reunited with Florence via facetime to help gather information on the case. Florence and Darlene head to a bar on St Auguste as eventually Florence tells her she missed Neville a lot more than she thought she would. Darlene later tells Florence that Neville is going travelling and is leaving Saint Marie.

The final episode of Series 13 sees Florence return to Saint Marie and reunite with everyone in person. When she approaches her boat to travel, Neville returns and stops her to explain his feelings and to be with her. The pair head off into the sunset together on the boat, giving themselves a shot at being a couple.
