= Nicky Deuce =

2013 Nickelodeon film

- Based on: Nicky Deuce: Welcome to the Family by Steven R. Schirripa and Charles Fleming
- Written by: Art Edler Brown; Andy Callahan
- Screenplay by: Art Edler Brown; Andy Callahan; Douglas Sloan
- Story by: Charles Fleming; Steven R. Schirripa
- Directed by: Jonathan A. Rosenbaum
- Starring: Noah Munck; Cristine Prosperi; Steven R. Schirripa; Vincent Curatola; Tony Sirico; Michael Imperioli; James Gandolfini; Rita Moreno
- Theme music composer: Ramachandra Borcar
- Countries of origin: United States; Canada
- Original language: English

Production
- Producer: Ric Nish
- Running time: 67 minutes

Original release
- Network: Nickelodeon
- Release: May 27, 2013

Nicky Deuce is an American-Canadian TV movie coproduced by Nickelodeon and YTV starring Noah Munck, which is based on the book Nicky Deuce: Welcome to the Family by Steven R. Schirripa and Charles Fleming. The film was directed by Jonathan A. Rosenbaum and written by Art Edler Brown, Andy Callahan, and Douglas Sloan. It premiered on Nickelodeon on May 27, 2013. This is one of James Gandolfini's final appearances and his last onscreen work to be released in his lifetime; he died three weeks after this movie premiered.

== Plot ==
Shy teenager Nicholas Borelli II lives with his parents in a small town. His life is not very exciting, especially since his parents are overbearing with regard to germs and diet. His only friend is Josh who is the opposite of him. Nicholas was about to spend the summer holidays in a math camp, while his parents are working in Papua New Guinea. However, due to an unforeseen circumstance, the math camp is cancelled. Seeing difficulty in getting Nicholas to Papua New Guinea, he is sent to spend the summer in Brooklyn, New York City, with his paternal grandmother Tutti and his uncle Frankie, both of whom he's never met.

First, Nicholas is overwhelmed by life in the big city. Besides, he does not dare to ask his uncle about his job, since his father had persuaded him to stay away from Frankie, since he would not fit into the family. Nicholas finds connection to the New York teenagers Donna and Tommy, who help him to get along in the metropolis. Over time, the clues are growing that Frankie is working for the Mafia. When Nicholas takes a phone call on Frankie's private phone, he takes a job for a man named Paulie, which actually leads him into a mafia environment. Nicholas and Tommy go to the apartment of Bobby Eggs to recovery a debt that Eggs owes Paulie. Tommy backs out but Nicholas goes to talk to Eggs, injuring him in a series of unintentional accidents. Eggs pays up immediately and he asks for Nicholas' name. Inspired by one of his favorite movies, he gives himself the name 'Nicky Deuce'. Due to the debt collection job, he gains some recognition within the gangster ring, which brings him further orders. Nicky is also sure his uncle is a mafioso, as the orders were intended for him.

Nicky, Donna and Tommy are discovering that the Mafia is cheating on horse racing gambling by conditioning their own racehorses through hypnosis and launching them as outsiders. Through a keyword, the horse is "switched" in the race, wins the race, and the gang around Paulie cashes large amounts of money. While investigating, Tommy is accidentally hypnotized too. The three teenagers kidnap the racehorse, whereupon the gangsters kidnap Tutti. However, Nicky and the gang's attempt to exchange Tutti for the racehorse fails. Nicky, Donna, Tommy, Tutti and Frankie, as well as Nicky's parents are overwhelmed and tied up by the gangsters. They manage to free themselves, but can no longer prevent the manipulated horserace.

When Paulie goes to pick up his winnings, Frankie reveals his true profession: as a covert investigator of the NYPD, he was thrown into the gang to reveal their criminal machinations; the gangsters are caught red-handed and arrested. Nicky's dad now sees Frankie in a new light and they reconcile. Tutti tells Nicky's parents to allow him to have more excitement in his life. The group attends a dance together, and Nicky and Donna kiss.

== Cast ==
- Noah Munck as Nicholas "Nicky Deuce" Borelli II
- Cristine Prosperi as Donna
- Steven R. Schirripa as Uncle Frankie
- Rita Moreno as Grandma Tutti
- Vincent Curatola as Paulie
- Tony Sirico as Charlie Cement
- Michael Imperioli as The Doctor
- Cassius Crieghtney as Tommy
- Jesse Camacho as Josh
- Carlo Mestroni as Mr. Borelli
- Mark Camacho as Carmine
- Andrea Frankle as Mrs. Borelli
- James Gandolfini as Bobby Eggs
