= Erika Prevost =

Canadian actress and dancer (born July 14, 1995)

- Prevost on the set of Saint-Pierre
- Born: July 14, 1995 (age 31); Montreal, Quebec, Canada
- Education: National Theatre School of Canada
- Occupations: Actress, dancer
- Years active: 2014–present

Erika Prevost (born 1995) is a Canadian actress and dancer. After beginning her career in dance, she joined the teen drama The Next Step as Sloane in 2016, and later played Brianna Bradley in Dare Me and Tala in the fourth season of The Boys. Since 2025 she has starred as Patty Montclair-Ito in the CBC police procedural Saint-Pierre.

== Early life and education ==
Prevost, of partial Japanese Canadian origin, was born in Montreal in 1995. When she was two, her family moved to Kobe, Japan, to live with an aunt, an uncle and her grandfather. She trained first as a dancer, in hip-hop, ballet, contemporary, jazz funk and ballroom, and originally hoped to tour as a dancer with pop stars.

She studied acting at the National Theatre School of Canada, graduating in 2020. Her roles there included Juliet in Romeo and Juliet and Round Rose/Tokyo Rose in a production of Marie Clements's Burning Vision directed by Mike Payette. After graduating she settled in Toronto.

== Career ==
=== Early work and The Next Step ===
Prevost was dancing professionally as a teenager when friends in Toronto sent her an audition call for The Next Step. She joined the series as Sloane in its fourth season, one of a group of new dancers added to the cast, which premiered on Family Channel on February 15, 2016. Her other early screen credits include the dance film Step Up: All In (2014), the first season of American Gods (2017) and the horror film Polaroid (2019).

=== Television and film, 2019–2023 ===
Prevost played Brianna Bradley, a high-school cheerleader, in the USA Network series Dare Me, which aired from December 2019 to March 2020 and later streamed on Netflix. She also played Sophie in the 2020 reboot of Party of Five.

She took the lead role of June Kingsley in the Lifetime holiday film Saying Yes to Christmas, which premiered on November 30, 2021. Her character is a career-driven woman whom a Christmas wish compels to accept every invitation while she is home for the holidays. She appeared in the Amazon Prime Video film Colors of Love (2021), played Tori Vince in the Syfy slasher film Bring It On: Cheer or Die (2022), and appeared in Scream VI (2023).

=== The Boys and Saint-Pierre ===
In 2024 Prevost had a recurring role in the fourth season of the Prime Video series The Boys as Tala, a soldier of the Shining Light Liberation Army. Tala blames Kimiko Miyashiro for her abduction into the group as a child and for the scar on her face. It was her first Japanese-speaking role.

Since 2025 she has starred as Patty Montclair-Ito, a rookie officer, in Saint-Pierre. The series is a CBC police procedural created by Allan Hawco, Robina Lord-Stafford and Perry Chafe, filmed in Saint-Pierre and Miquelon and St. John's, Newfoundland, and broadcast on CBC and CBC Gem. Deadline Hollywood described the role as the one she is perhaps best known for.

=== Later film work ===
In August 2025 Prevost was cast opposite Dylan Playfair in Send the Rain, an independent drama written and directed by Hayley Gray and Kaayla Whachell and shot in British Columbia, By January 2026 she had completed filming in the lead role. The film premiered at the 2026 Vancouver International Film Festival.

That month she joined Sara Waisglass and Damian Hardung in Into the Deep Blue. The film is director Jonathan Wright's adaptation of a coming-of-age novel by Jennifer E. Archer, and Prevost plays May, the heroine's best friend and co-worker.

== Personal life ==
Prevost is in a relationship with actor Micheal J. Hill, a graduate of the Toronto Film School.

== Selected filmography ==
=== Film ===
| Year | Title | Role | Notes |
|---|---|---|---|
| 2021 | Saying Yes to Christmas | June Kingsley | Television film |
| 2022 | Bring It On: Cheer or Die | Tori Vince | |
| 2026 | Send the Rain | Erika | |
| TBA | Into the Deep Blue | May | |

=== Television ===
| Year | Title | Role | Notes |
|---|---|---|---|
| 2016 | The Next Step | Sloane | Main cast from season 4 |
| 2019–2020 | Dare Me | Brianna Bradley | |
| 2020 | Party of Five | Sophie | |
| 2024 | The Boys | Tala | Recurring, season 4 |
| 2025–present | Saint-Pierre | Patty Montclair-Ito | Main role |
