= Cristine Prosperi =

Canadian actress

Cristine Prosperi Binnington
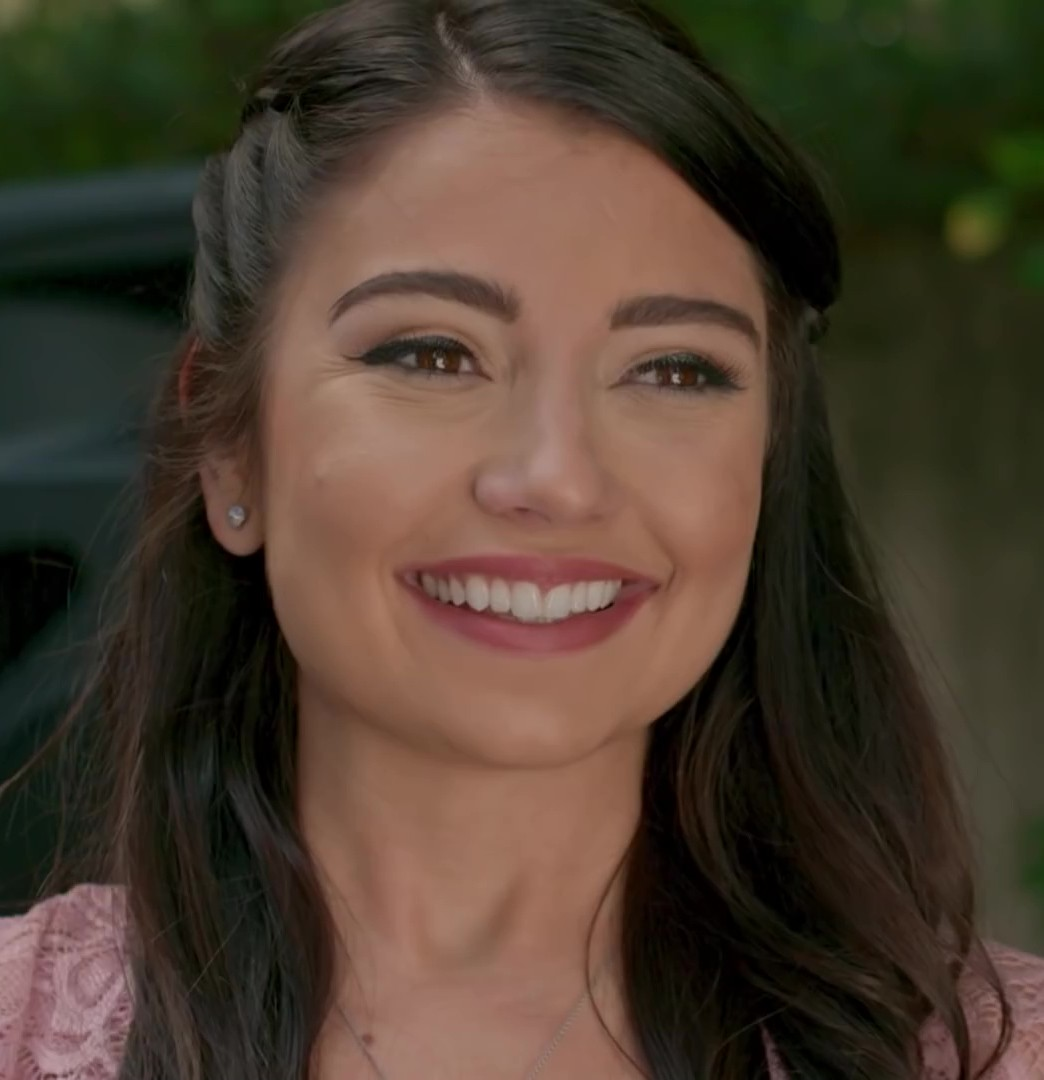
- Prosperi in 2018
- Born: Toronto, Ontario, Canada
- Occupation: Actress
- Years active: 2006–present
- Spouse: Jordan Binnington (m. 2023)
- Children: 1

Cristine Prosperi Binnington is a Canadian actress. She is known for portraying Imogen Moreno on the long-running television series Degrassi. She also starred as Aria on the web series Totally Amp'd, and as Mikayla Walker on the YTV and TeenNick television series Open Heart.

== Career ==
Prosperi was born in Toronto, to a family of Greek and Italian descent and debuted on screen when she was three in an advertisement for Unico. A singer and dancer, she began her acting career with small roles in the 2007 movies Stir of Echoes: The Homecoming and Your Beautiful Cul de Sac Home. In 2009, she guest starred on the Family Channel comedy series The Latest Buzz.

In 2011, Prosperi was cast as Imogen Moreno on the long-running television teen drama Degrassi, a role she began playing during the show's eleventh season. She remained on Degrassi until the end of the show in 2015 with the fourteenth season. For her performance, she won the Best Performance in a TV Series – Leading Young Actress Award at Young Artist Awards in 2012, and she attracted a following in the LGBT community.

In 2012, Prosperi starred in the web series Totally Amp'd as Aria, and in 2013, she starred in the Nickelodeon television movie Nicky Deuce. In 2015, she appeared in the TeenNick series Open Heart, where she played the role of the bright and gossipy Mikayla Walker. In 2017, she starred as Destiny in the Bring It On film Bring It On: Worldwide Cheersmack.

In 2016, she starred in the Lifetime movie His Double Life. Since 2017, she continued to act in Lifetime films.

== Personal life ==
Prosperi got engaged to St. Louis Blues player Jordan Binnington in September 2021. The two were married on July 8, 2023 and had a son in July 2024.

== Filmography ==
=== Film ===
Year	Title	Role	Notes
2007	Your Beautiful Cul de Sac Home	The Cat	
2017	Bring It On: Worldwide Cheersmack	Destiny	

=== Television ===
Year	Title	Role	Notes
2007	Stir of Echoes: The Homecoming	Iraqi Girl	Television movie
2009	The Latest Buzz	Actor	Episode: "The Weekend Issue"
2011–2012	Really Me	Tiara	Recurring role; 11 episodes
2011–2015	Degrassi: The Next Generation	Imogen Moreno	Main role (seasons 11–14)
2013	Nicky Deuce	Donna	Television movie
2015	Open Heart	Mikayla Walker	Main role
2015	We Are Disorderly	Sydney	Episode: "Our Leather Jackets"
2016	His Double Life	Scarlett	Television movie
2016	Raising Expectations	Chantal	Episode: "The Nerds and the Bees"
2017	The Wrong Neighbor	Lisa Sullivan	Television movie
2017	A Christmas Cruise	Jessica Knoll	Television movie
2018	Murdered at 17	Brooke Emerson	Television movie
2018	2nd Generation	Virginia	5 episodes
2018	A Wedding for Christmas	Haley Foster	Television movie
2019	The Wrong Cheerleader	Becky	Television movie
2020	Killer Competition	Sarah Elsworth	Television movie
2021	The Wrong Prince Charming	Anna	Television movie
2021	Nine Films About Technology	Kayla	Episode: "Under the Influence"
2021	Putting Love to the Test	Liz Harris	Television movie
2022	It's Beginning to Look a Lot Like Murder	Diana	Television movie

=== Web series ===
Year	Title	Role	Notes
2011-2012	Totally Amp'd	Aria	10 episodes
2011-2014	Degrassi: Minis	Imogen Moreno	4 episodes

== Awards and nominations ==
Year	Award	Category	Work	Result	Notes	Refs
2012	Young Artist Awards	Best Performance in a TV Series – Leading Young Actress	Degrassi	Won	Tied with Niamh Wilson	
2013	Young Artist Awards	Best Performance in a TV Series (Comedy or Drama) – Leading Young Actress	Degrassi	Nominated		
