= Send the Rain =

2026 Canadian drama film

- Directed by: Hayley Gray; Kaayla Whachell
- Written by: Hayley Gray; Kaayla Whachell
- Produced by: Mike Johnston
- Starring: Erika Prevost; Sachiko Tsujimoto; Dylan Playfair
- Cinematography: Kaayla Whachell
- Edited by: Michael Vidler
- Music by: Caleb Chan
- Production company: Studio 104 Entertainment
- Distributed by: Vortex Media; Bell Media
- Release date: October 2, 2026 (VIFF)
- Running time: 94 minutes
- Country: Canada
- Language: English

Send the Rain is a Canadian drama film, directed by Hayley Gray and Kaayla Whachell and released in 2026. The film stars Erika Prevost as Erika, a young woman from Vancouver, British Columbia, who travels to the strawberry farm owned by her Okinawan grandmother, played by Sachiko Tsujimoto, to convince her that she needs to leave for her safety during the 2021 British Columbia wildfires.

== Cast ==
- Erika Prevost as Erika
- Dylan Playfair as Finn
- Sachiko Tsujimoto as Oba
- Doug Abrahams as Jim
- Hiromoto Ida as Mr.H
- Maaya Gillham as Midori
- Mayumi Yoshida as Young Adult Oba
- Cody Kearsley as Curtis
- Jen Araki-Playfair as Callie

== Production ==
=== Short film version ===
The film is an expansion of the 2022 short film Send the Rain, which was the winner of the DGC Award for Best Short Film at the 2022 Directors Guild of Canada awards. The short version was written and directed by Gray on her own, but featured Whachell's participation as cinematographer.

The original film starred Laara Sadiq and Veena Sood, but centred on residents of a small town in British Columbia coping with the wildfires on their own; after Whachell became a full co-writer and co-director of the feature version, they took the screenplay in a different direction that drew on Whachell's own Okinawan heritage and introduced the themes of intergenerational conflict and family trauma.

=== Feature ===
The casting of Prevost and Playfair was announced in summer 2025.

== Release ==
The film premiered in the Northern Lights program at the 2026 Vancouver International Film Festival.

== Awards ==
At VIFF, it received an honorable mention for the Arbutus Award for Best British Columbia Film.

The film is also slated to screen in the Borsos Competition program at the 2026 Whistler Film Festival.
