= Saint-Pierre (TV series) =

Canadian police procedural television series

- Created by: Allan Hawco; Robina Lord-Stafford; Perry Chafe
- Showrunners: Allan Hawco; Robina Lord-Stafford
- Starring: Allan Hawco; Joséphine Jobert; Benz Antoine; Erika Prevost; Jean-Michel Le Gal; Ayesha Mansur Gonsalves; Tamara Podemski; Assaad Bouab; Caroline Dhavernas
- Countries of origin: Canada; France
- Original languages: English; French
- No. of seasons: 2
- No. of episodes: 22

Production
- Executive producers: Allan Hawco; Robina Lord-Stafford; Janine Squires; Erin Sullivan; John Vatcher
- Production locations: Saint-Pierre and Miquelon; St. John's, Newfoundland and Labrador
- Production company: Hawco Productions

Original release
- Network: CBC
- Release: January 6, 2025 – present

Saint-Pierre is a Canadian police procedural television series that premiered on January 6, 2025, on CBC Television. It is set and filmed in the French collectivity of Saint-Pierre and Miquelon and St. John's, Newfoundland. In May 2025, the series was renewed for a second season, which premiered on January 5, 2026. In May 2026, the series was renewed for a third season, which began filming in July 2026 and is scheduled to premiere in winter 2027.

== Premise ==
After one of Donny "Fitz" Fitzpatrick's investigations gets uncomfortably close to the corruption of a powerful local politician, he is exiled to the French collectivity of Saint-Pierre and Miquelon, where he partners with local police officer Geneviève "Arch" Archambault to solve local crimes.

== Cast and characters ==
=== Main ===
- Allan Hawco as Sgt. Inspector Donny "Fitz" Fitzpatrick, initially an Inspector with the Royal Newfoundland Constabulary
- Joséphine Jobert as Deputy Chief Geneviève "Arch" Archambault
- Benz Antoine as Marcus Villeneuve, SPMP Chief Inspector and Arch's mentor
- Erika Prevost as Patty Montclair-Ito, junior inspector for the SPMP
- Jean-Michel Le Gal as Renuf Aucoin, senior inspector for the SPMP
- Ayesha Mansur Gonsalves as Veda Gonsalves (seasons 1–2), Arch's best friend and reformed hacker who owns a bar in Saint-Pierre
- James Purefoy as Sean Gallagher (season 1, recurring season 2), an international crime boss
- Tamara Podemski as Dr. Natasha Bourge (season 2, recurring season 1), medical examiner for the SPMP
- Assaad Bouab as Pascal Lalonde (season 3), a highly decorated officer from mainland France with experience in dismantling criminal organizations
- Caroline Dhavernas as Victoria Peters (season 3), a businesswoman planning to turn Saint-Pierre into a tourist destination who becomes enamoured with Fitz

=== Supporting ===
- Lara Arabian as Emmanuelle
- Vanessa Matsui as Meredith Fitzpatrick
- Kim Nelson as Lisette Archambault
- Tim Rozon as Dr. Theo Fouchard
- Maxim Roy as Prefect Charlotte Diard
- Louise Pitre as Marguerite

== Episodes ==
Season	Episodes	Originally released	
Season	Episodes	First released	Last released
1	10	January 6, 2025	March 10, 2025
2	12	January 5, 2026	April 13, 2026

=== Season 1 (2025) ===
No. overall	No. in season	Title	Directed by	Written by	Original release date
1	1	"Queen Bee"	TJ Scott	Allan Hawco & Robina Lord-Stafford	January 6, 2025
2	2	"Kill Lil"	John Vatcher	Robina Lord-Stafford & Allan Hawco	January 13, 2025
3	3	"Off with His Head"	John Vatcher	Jennifer Kassabian	January 20, 2025
4	4	"Island Getaway"	TJ Scott	Perry Chafe	January 27, 2025
5	5	"The Bogman Cometh"	Winnifred Jong	Patrick Tarr	February 3, 2025
6	6	"Only the Good Die Young"	Winnifred Jong	Caleigh Bacchus	February 10, 2025
7	7	"Ghost From the Past"	Winnifred Jong	Russ Cochrane	February 17, 2025
8	8	"With a Little Help From My Friends"	Vanessa Matsui	Robina Lord-Stafford & Jennifer Kassabian	February 24, 2025
9	9	"Bad Friends, Bons Ennemis"	John Vatcher	Allan Hawco & Perry Chafe	March 3, 2025
10	10	"Reap What We Sow"	John Vatcher	Allan Hawco & Robina Lord-Stafford	March 10, 2025

=== Season 2 (2026) ===
No. overall	No. in season	Title	Directed by	Written by	Original release date
11	1	"Sleep No More"	TJ Scott	Allan Hawco & Robina Lord-Stafford	January 5, 2026
12	2	"Inside Woman"	TJ Scott	Robina Lord-Stafford & Allan Hawco	January 12, 2026
13	3	"The Mouth of Hell"	Vanessa Matsui	Russ Cochrane	January 19, 2026
14	4	"Death at a Funeral"	John Vatcher	JP Larocque	January 26, 2026
15	5	"Dirty Jane"	John Vatcher	Wendy Coulas	February 2, 2026
16	6	"Wheelman"	Winnifred Jong	Seneca Aaron	February 23, 2026
17	7	"Vanishing Act"	Winnifred Jong	Joseph Milando	March 2, 2026
18	8	"High School Confidential"	Winnifred Jong	Russ Cochrane & Angelica Mendizabal	March 16, 2026
19	9	"Red rum, Red rum"	Sharon Lewis	Motion	March 23, 2026
20	10	"Tick, Tick, Boom!"	Sharon Lewis	Russ Cochrane & Angelica Mendizabal	March 30, 2026
21	11	"Cerulean Blue"	John Vatcher	Allan Hawco	April 6, 2026
22	12	"Who the F is Alice?"	John Vatcher	Robina Lord-Stafford	April 13, 2026

== Production ==
Hawco during filming of the third season, 2026

The series was created by Allan Hawco, Robina Lord-Stafford, and Perry Chafe for Hawco Productions, with Fifth Season handling global distribution. The first season was filmed in 2024 on Saint-Pierre and Miquelon. In May 2025, the series was renewed for a second season, which began filming in June 2025.

In May 2026, CBC renewed the series for a twelve-episode third season. Filming began in July 2026 in St. John's and on Saint-Pierre and Miquelon, with Assaad Bouab and Caroline Dhavernas joining the cast. Hawco and Lord-Stafford continued as showrunners, and the season's directors include Winnifred Jong, Sharon Lewis, Vanessa Matsui, TJ Scott, and John Vatcher.

== Broadcast ==
The series premiered on CBC and CBC Gem on January 6, 2025. The second season, expanded from ten episodes to twelve, premiered on January 5, 2026. The third season is scheduled to premiere in winter 2027.

In January 2026, Fifth Season announced sales of the first season to UKTV in the United Kingdom, France Télévisions, the ABC in Australia, Disney in Belgium and Eastern Europe, Quebecor for French Canada, FreeTV in Israel, Sky in New Zealand, and BBC Studios for BBC NL in the Netherlands and BBC First in Poland. In the United Kingdom, the series airs on U&Alibi. Its first French broadcast was on Saint-Pierre et Miquelon La 1ère, which began airing the first season on April 29, 2026.

== Reception ==
=== Ratings ===
CBC reported that the first season was its most-watched new series of the year, and according to Numeris it was among the top Canadian drama series nationwide. CBC later reported, on Numeris data, that Saint-Pierre was its most-watched drama series of the 2025–26 television season.

=== Critical response ===
Phil Harrison, writing for The Guardian, gave the show three stars out of five, comparing it to Death in Paradise.

=== Accolades ===
Year	Award	Category	Nominee(s)	Result	Ref.
2026	Canadian Screen Awards	Best Drama Series	Allan Hawco, Erin Sullivan, Janine Squires, Robina Lord-Stafford, John Vatcher, Perry Chafe	Nominated	
2026	Canadian Screen Awards	Best Lead Performer, Drama Series	Allan Hawco	Nominated	
2026	Canadian Screen Awards	Best Writing, Drama Series	Allan Hawco and Robina Lord-Stafford (for "Queen Bee")	Nominated	
2026	Canadian Screen Awards	Best Guest Performance, Drama Series	Ayesha Mansur Gonsalves (for "Off with His Head" / "Ghost From the Past")	Nominated	
2026	Canadian Screen Awards	Best Guest Performance, Drama Series	Michelle Monteith (for "Queen Bee")	Nominated	
2026	Canadian Screen Awards	Best Costume Design	(for "Bad Friends, Bons Ennemis")	Nominated	
