= Jean-Michel Le Gal =

Canadian actor

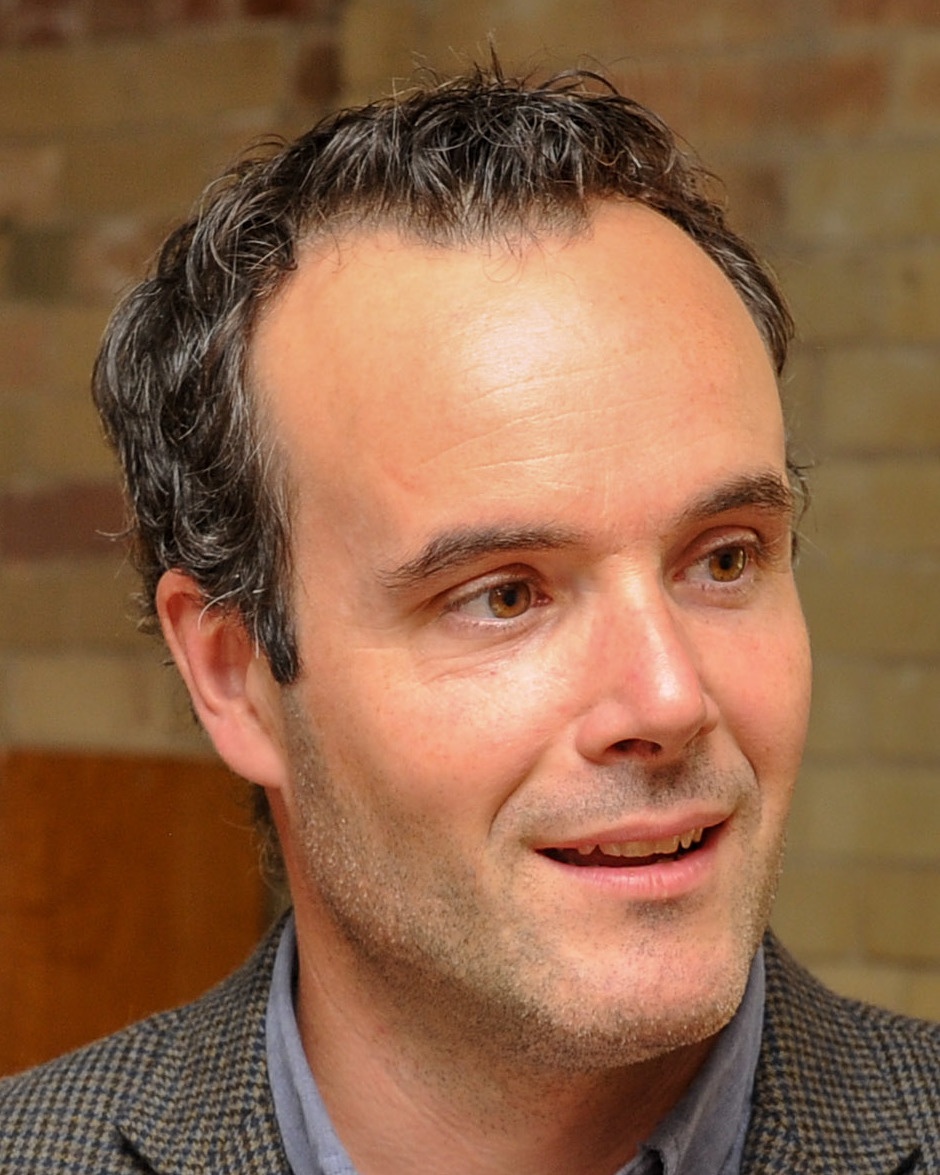
- Born: Toronto, Ontario, Canada
- Occupation: Actor
- Years active: 2002–present

Jean-Michel Le Gal is a Canadian stage, television and film actor and creator.

== Biography ==
=== Early life ===
Le Gal was born in Toronto, Ontario to a francophone stage actress and television/music producer. He began acting at 10, opposite a squirrel puppet in the twelve-part television kids series Pri-Maths for TVOntario. In high school, he toured many schools in the Outaouais region with the community troupe Théâtre des Lueurs. Jean-Michel then participated in a seven-month cultural exchange with Canada World Youth between British Columbia and Sulawesi in Indonesia.

==== Theater ====
After three years of professional theatre training at Langara College's Studio 58 in Vancouver, Le Gal studied at the Birmingham Conservatory at the Stratford Festival in Stratford, Ontario in 2003 and 2004.

His first role at Stratford was in the 2004 production of Noises Off, directed by Brian Bedford, and his performance sparked rave reviews from the Globe and Mail. He then went on to play numerous roles over four seasons including: Ferdinand in The Tempest opposite William Hutt, Silvius in As You Like It and Lorenzo in Merchant of Venice. He also received Stratford's John Hirsch Award for most promising actor.

In Montreal, he played Pierrot and La Violette in Dom Juan de Molière at the Théâtre du Nouveau Monde with Benoît Brière and James Hyndman, directed by Lorraine Pintal. Le Gal played Horace in École des femmes by Molière at the Théâtre français de Toronto, receiving a positive review from Stage Door.

In 2009, Le Gal attended the inaugural Actor's Conservatory at the Canadian Film Centre where he trained with Sarah Polley, Kiefer Sutherland, and Norman Jewison.

=== Writing and Directing ===
Since 2004, Jean-Michel has written and directed three short films shot in Argentina, British Columbia and the Black Forest in Germany. Also, with director John Stead, he wrote and produced the pilot episode of the comic series The Bobby Buck Show.

=== Theater education ===
In 2010, Jean-Michel co-founded the theatre school at Théâtre français de Toronto. As artistic director, he created over 850 hours of workshops, 55 collective presentations for families, co-created and led a yearly summer camp with l’Alliance française de Toronto and a theatre club at Lycée Français Toronto, as well as directed seven musicals for kids performed on professional stages, before his departure in 2021.

Jean-Michel Le Gal has been passionately working in artistic education since 2002. During this time he has created and led over 1200 hours of contemporary and classical theatre workshops in both official languages for the Stratford Festival, University of Toronto, Canadian Film Centre, Ontario Arts Council and other of Canada's leading artistic institutions. In 2019, Jean-Michel was nominated for the Inaugural Johanna Metcalf Performing Arts Prize, celebrating Ontario’s leading creators in the performing arts.

=== Volunteer work ===
In 2017, Jean-Michel co-founded ArtiCulture, a non-profit corporation that connects people to farms and wilderness through the arts. As a member of the Board and Artist Circle he has co-created cultural events in rural settings in partnership with Tourisme Outaouais.

== Notable credits ==
=== Film ===
- The Invisibles (2024)
- 1Up (2022)
- French Exit (2020)
- The Knight Before Christmas (2019)
- State Like Sleep (2018)
- What We Have (2015)
- Take This Waltz (2011)

=== Television ===
- Saint-Pierre, As Renuf Aucoin (2025–2026)
- Paris Paris, Dominic Desjardins / TV5
- Hudson & Rex, Dir. John Vatcher / CityTV
- Murdoch Mysteries, principal, Dir. Don McCutcheon / CBC
- Orphan Black, principal, Dir. John Fawcett / BBC America / Space
- Les Bleus de Ramville, TFO (2012)
- Météo+, TFO (2008–2011)

=== Stratford Festival ===
- Merchant of Venice, Lorenzo, dir. Richard Rose
- Comedy of Errors, Angelo, dir. Richard Monette
- An Ideal Husband, Mr.Montford, dir. Richard Monette
- Don Juan, Marigold, dir. Lorraine Pintal
- London Assurance, Martin, dir. Brian Bedford
- The Tempest, Ferdinand, dir. Richard Monette
- The Lark, Brother Ladvenu, dir. Michael Lindsay-Hogg
- As You Like It, Silvius, dir. Antoni Cimolino
- Henry VIII, Surveyor, dir. Richard Monette
- Noises Off, Garry Lejeune, dir. Brian Bedford

=== Other theatre ===
- L'école des femmes, Horace, Theatre francais de Toronto
- Le dîner des cons, Juste Leblanc, Theatre francais de Toronto
- Corpus Christi, Peter, Hoarse Raven Theatre, Vancouver
