= Joséphine Jobert =

French actress and singer

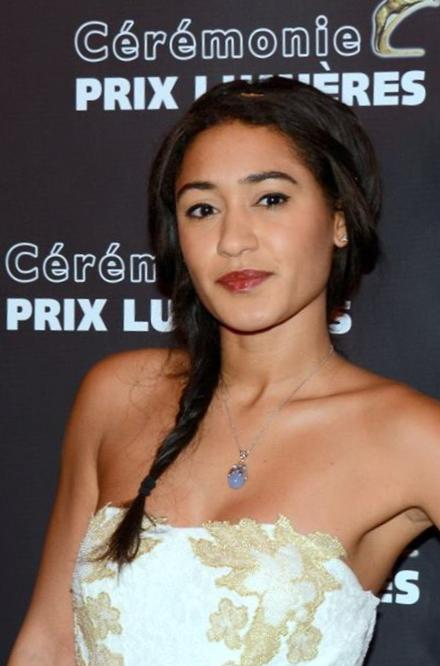
- Jobert at the 19th Lumière Awards in 2014
- Born: Paris, France
- Occupation: Actress
- Years active: 1999–present
- Relatives: Marlène Jobert (aunt); Eva Green (cousin); Elsa Lunghini (cousin)

Joséphine Jobert (French: [ʒozefin ʒɔbɛʁ]) is a French actress and singer. She is best known to English-language audiences for playing Detective Sergeant Florence Cassell in the BBC One series Death in Paradise (2015–2024) and her lead role as a police officer in Saint-Pierre (2025–present).

== Early life and education ==
Joséphine Jobert was born in Paris, France. Her father is from a Sephardic Jewish and Pied-Noir family from Algeria, and her mother's ancestry is Martiniquaise, Spanish and Chinese. Jobert comes from a family of performing artists, including her paternal aunt Marlène Jobert and cousins Eva Green and Elsa Lunghini.

In 1997, aged 12, Jobert moved with her parents to Montreal, Canada, for eight years, where she studied singing and acting, and took her first steps into television. With her friends and her parents, she participated in the creation of songs, videos, a web series, and a television series on the internet. She attended drama workshops by Stéphane Belugou as well as Coda Music School.

== Career ==
From 2008 to 2014, Jobert appeared in several French television series.

In 2015, she took on her first English-language role as Detective Sergeant Florence Cassell in the BBC One series Death in Paradise at the beginning of its fourth season. In 2019, she left the show for "personal and professional reasons" after episode six of the eighth season, but returned for the tenth season in 2021. She was also in the 11th season and made her final regular appearance on the fourth episode of that season. She reprised her role two years later for a guest stint in series 13.

Since 2024, Jobert has appeared as Deputy Chief Geneviève "Arch" Archambault in the CBC Television series Saint-Pierre.

== Filmography ==
=== Television ===
- 2007–2009: Our Pension Years as Amel Habib (seasons 1–3)
- 2007–2011: Lightning as Alice Watson
- 2010: My Friends, My Loves, My Shit... as Lou, a mechanic (episode 2.06, "All Fire and Flame")
- 2012: I Was Your Age as Yasmine (directed by Bruno Garcia)
- 2013: Alice Nevers: The Judge is a Woman as Djamila (Episode 11.06, Amazon)
- 2013–2014: Under the Sun of Saint-Tropez as Roxanne
- 2013–2014: Cut! as Victory Vila
- 2014: Villa Karayib as Kannelle Benneteau Meadow
- 2015–2019, 2021–2022, 2024: Death in Paradise as Detective Sergeant Florence Cassell (series 4–8, 10–11 and 13)
- 2023: Meurtres dans le Cantal as Sarah Waro
- 2024: ConcordIA as Mathilde
- 2025–present: Saint-Pierre as Deputy Chief Geneviève "Arch" Archambault (lead role)

=== Film ===
- 2012: Love Survey as Jo (directed by Véronique Mucret Rouveyrollis)
- 2013: Words as Esmeralda/filmmaker (directed by Véronique Mucret Rouveyrollis)

=== Video ===
- 2003: "Big Star" by Patrick Marty
- 2007: "For the life" (single from the album Our Pension Years)

=== Albums ===
- 2007: Our Pension Years (soundtrack to the first season of the series)
- 2008: Our Pension Years 2 (soundtrack of the second season)
- 2009: Our Pension Years 3 (soundtrack to the third season)
