= Bring It On: Worldwide Cheersmack =

- Official DVD cover
- Directed by: Robert Adetuyi
- Written by: Alyson Fouse
- Produced by: Mike Elliott
- Starring: Cristine Prosperi; Sophie Vavasseur; Jordan Rodrigues; Vivica A. Fox
- Cinematography: Trevor A. Brown
- Edited by: Richard Starkey
- Music by: Frank Fitzpatrick
- Production companies: Beacon Pictures; Capital Arts Entertainment
- Distributed by: Universal 1440 Entertainment
- Release date: August 29, 2017
- Running time: 95 minutes
- Country: United States
- Language: English

Bring It On: Worldwide Cheersmack (stylized as Bring It On: Worldwide #Cheersmack, and known as Bring It On: Worldwide Showdown in the United Kingdom) is a 2017 cheerleading film directed by Robert Adetuyi, and the sixth installment in the Bring It On film series. It was released direct-to-video on August 29, 2017.

== Plot ==
Destiny is a bossy, overconfident, victory-obsessed cheerleader who often ignores input from her peers, including her best friend, Willow. Though largely self-centered, she does have a high degree of respect for Cheer Goddess, a retired cheerleader who was a five-time champion and now hosts a popular podcast. Destiny is the captain of The Rebels, a cheer squad based in America, who has won many world championships.

While performing at a local tournament one day, the squad's routine is interrupted when the audio and visual feed is hacked by The Truth, a mysterious, masked squad who threatens to dethrone them. Humiliated, Destiny flees the scene, stumbling across a group of street dancers who ridicule her for her profession. Meanwhile, as a result of the attack from The Truth, public opinion turns against The Rebels, causing them to lose members and get ridiculed online as other cheer squads throughout the world become emboldened to try and break their winning streak as well.

Undeterred, Destiny decides to scout around a local diner for new (male) members, but when the attempt fails, she decides to recruit the same street dancers she encountered the other day. When they refuse, The Rebels make a bet that if they can beat the street dancers in a dance-off, then the dancers will join the squad, which they ultimately do. While the two parties have difficulty getting along, Destiny does manage to start a budding romance with Blake, the leader of the dance troupe, who also reveals himself to be a graffiti artist. Nonetheless, she still finds herself frustrated at how unproductive the practice sessions turn out to be and vents her frustrations via video diaries on her laptop, in which she insults the new members of her own squad. Amidst all the infighting, Willow comes up with some new routines alongside one of the street dancers, with whom she also forms a romantic bond, though Destiny is quick to reject this, believing herself to be the only one capable of leading The Rebels to victory. After some self-reflection, however, Destiny decides to lighten up and be a more open-minded captain.

Meanwhile, The Truth goes on Cheer Goddess' show and proposes a worldwide tournament that would be voted on by the people, pressuring The Rebels to partake in it. Soon after this, however, Destiny's rant gets leaked online for the entire squad to see, causing many members, including the street dancers, to resign from their positions. Destiny eventually puts together that The Truth was formed by Willow, alongside Hannah, the seemingly dimwitted member of The Rebels, in retaliation for her overly strict leadership, and that many of the former Rebels have also joined this new squad. Standing by her best friend, Willow states that her intention was only to teach Destiny a lesson and that Hannah betrayed her by trying to bring down the whole squad in addition to this.

Destiny and Willow decide to make do with the remaining cheerleaders on their squad, but are surprised to see some former members, including Roxanne, come back, stating that Hannah is behaving the same way Destiny did before. Feeling more emboldened, and even managing to reclaim some of the street dancers, The Rebels partake in the worldwide competition, competing against now-unmasked Truth in the finals, ultimately beating them and winning the competition.

== Cast ==
- Cristine Prosperi as Destiny
- Sophie Vavasseur as Hannah
- Jordan Rodrigues as Blake
- Gia Ré as Willow
- Natalie Walsh as Roxanne
- Sven Ruygrok as Jeff
- Vivica A. Fox as Cheer Goddess

== Reception ==
Common Sense Media panned the film, rating it one star and writing "Obviously Bring It On: Worldwide #Cheersmack was made on the cheap. The execution lacks flair, depth, and wit." DVD Talk also reviewed the film, stating that it was "especially forgettable and loses most of the cheer in cheerleading, but I'll give it points for at least being nice to look at." Cliché Magazine criticized the film's plot, but praised Vivica Fox's appearance in the film, as well as the chemistry and friendships of some of the characters.
