= Eclipse Jazz =

Student organization

Eclipse Jazz was a student-run committee within the University Activities Center at the University of Michigan in Ann Arbor, Michigan. From 1975 to 1993 it operated under the auspices of the University’s Major Events Office, showcasing jazz performers and giving students hands-on experience in the performing arts business.

Eclipse presented prominent, internationally recognized jazz artists, attracting large audiences and gaining recognition for the range of music it curated. Eclipse presented over 170 concerts over its 18 years. It also offered free educational workshops with many of its artists to help the audience understand and appreciate the music. These achievements brought Ann Arbor to national importance in the jazz community.

== Beginnings ==
For its first concert on November 2, 1975, Eclipse Jazz presented McCoy Tyner, the pianist from the John Coltrane Quartet, who returned to Eclipse in 1985 for its 10th Anniversary concert.

== 1978 festival ==
In September 1978, Eclipse Jazz presented its first festival over four days at Ann Arbor's largest concert hall, U-M's 4100-seat Hill Auditorium. Dedicated to Duke Ellington, the festival featured Mose Allison, Art Blakey, Kenny Burrell, a commissioned work from Charles Mingus premiered by the Mercer Ellington Orchestra, Dexter Gordon and Johnny Griffin, Freddie Hubbard, Max Roach and the Sun Ra Arkestra.

== Featured musicians ==
In addition to the artists already named, Eclipse presented Carla Bley, Ray Charles, Ornette Coleman, Chick Corea and Herbie Hancock (included in the 1978 Columbia recording, An Evening with Herbie Hancock & Chick Corea: In Concert); Dirty Dozen Brass Band, Ella Fitzgerald, Dizzy Gillespie, Bob James, Keith Jarrett, Earl Klugh, Steve Lacy, Pat Metheny, Charles Mingus, Old and New Dreams, Jaco Pastorius, Oscar Peterson, Weather Report and the World Saxophone Quartet. When he came out of retirement in 1981, Eclipse presented trumpeter Miles Davis at Hill Auditorium, his only university stop in a handful of tour dates.

Eclipse Jazz opened its concert seasons with broadly recognized artists, booking more experimental music later in each series. Commercially viable artists (e.g. Jean-Luc Ponty) generated profits to subsidize performers who were less well-known, such as the Art Ensemble of Chicago. This exposed audiences to jazz that was new to them, thereby increasing their knowledge of the art form.

== Bright Moments ==
Beginning in 1977, Eclipse hosted a series of smaller shows called Bright Moments (dedicated to the memory of Rahsaan Roland Kirk), which presented avant-garde jazz in intimate settings including the University of Michigan Residential College and the University Club in the Michigan Union. Many members of the Chicago-based Association for the Advancement of Creative Musicians were featured including Roscoe Mitchell and Famoudou Don Moye as well as free funk drummer/composer Ronald Shannon Jackson and reed men Oliver Lake and Julius Hemphill.

== Grant funding ==
Eclipse Jazz received four grants from the National Endowment for the Arts to underwrite its programming. They helped pave the way for the expansion of activities and venues including lectures and films, sound engineering classes, a free coffeehouse series called "Java and Jazz", jam sessions and free outdoor summer concerts during the award-winning Ann Arbor Art Fairs. The Art Fair concerts were broadcast live on Eclipse’s principal media partner, WCBN-FM 88.3 Ann Arbor.

== 40th anniversary commemoration ==
On April 18, 2016, the 40th anniversary of Eclipse Jazz was marked by the Ann Arbor District Library with "Eclipse Jazz: 40 Years On", a 90-minute panel discussion which brought together and featured 16 past members of the Eclipse organization from New York City, Los Angeles, Philadelphia, Boston, Detroit, Cleveland, Ann Arbor and Venice, Florida.
