= Simon Winstone =

British author, screenwriter and script editor

Simon Winstone is a British author, screenwriter and script editor, best known for his work on Doctor Who and on the BBC soap opera EastEnders.

== Career ==
Winstone worked for Virgin Books, overseeing their Missing Adventures Doctor Who series and briefly being in charge of the New Adventures after the series had ceased being a Doctor Who tie-in. His only novel, the New Adventure Where Angels Fear, was co-written with Rebecca Levene, his predecessor on the New Adventures.

Winstone moved into TV in the late 1990s, working on the popular ITV soap opera Emmerdale for a period. He then worked on rival BBC series EastEnders for many years as a story editor and then as a producer. In 2005, Winstone was announced as a script editor for Doctor Who on TV, a role he had until 2007.

In 2017, Winstone was appointed the head of BBC Studios' Head of Drama - Wales. In 2019, Winstone served as an Executive Producer on Amazon Prime and BBC Two's Good Omens.

He has written for crime drama Death in Paradise and period drama Dickensian, as well as served as an executive producer on the action-adventure series Hooten & the Lady, all Red Planet Pictures productions.
