= Bring It On (film series) =

American film franchise

- Box art for Bring It On: 6-Movie Cheer Pack, a four-disc compilation of the first six films.
- Created by: Jessica Bendinger
- Original work: Bring It On (2000)
- Owners: Universal Pictures (1); Universal Pictures Home Entertainment (2–7)
- Years: 2000–2022

Films and television
- Film: Bring It On (2000)
- Direct-to-video: Bring It On Again (2004); Bring It On: All or Nothing (2006); Bring It On: In It to Win It (2007); Bring It On: Fight to the Finish (2009); Bring It On: Worldwide Cheersmack (2017); Bring It On: Cheer or Die (2022)

Theatrical presentations
- Musical: Bring It On: The Musical

Bring It On is an anthology series of cheerleading films that began with Bring It On (2000) and was followed by five direct-to-video sequels and one Halloween-themed television film sequel.

The first film was loosely adapted into a musical, which has received positive critical response and praise.

== Cast ==
=== Principal cast ===
| Character | Films | | | | | | |
| Character | Bring It On | Bring It On Again | Bring It On: All or Nothing | Bring It On: In It to Win It | Bring It On: Fight to the Finish | Bring It On: Worldwide Cheersmack | Bring It On: Cheer or Die |
| Character | 2000 | 2004 | 2006 | 2007 | 2009 | 2017 | 2022 |
|---|---|---|---|---|---|---|---|
| Torrance Shipman | Kirsten Dunst | | | | | | |
| Missy Pantone | Eliza Dushku | | | | | | |
| Cliff Pantone | Jesse Bradford | | | | | | |
| Isis | Gabrielle Union | | | | | | |
| Whittier Smith | | Anne Judson-Yager | | | | | |
| Tina Hammersmith | | Bree Turner | | | | | |
| Dean Sebastian | | Kevin Cooney | | | | | |
| Monica | | Faune A. Chambers | | | | | |
| Greg | | Bryce Johnson | | | | | |
| Derek | | Richard Lee Jackson | | | | | |
| Marni Potts | | Bethany Joy Lenz | | | | | |
| Britney Allen | | | Hayden Panettiere | | | | |
| Camille | | | Solange Knowles | | | | |
| Jesse | | | Gus Carr | | | | |
| Winnie Harper | | | Marcy Rylan | | | | |
| Amber | | | Cindy Chiu | | | | |
| Kirresha | | | Giovonnie Samuels | | | | |
| Leti | | | Francia Almendarez | | | | |
| Brianna | | | Danielle Savre | | | | |
| Sierra | | | Jessica Fife | | | | |
| Brad Warner | | | Jake McDorman | | | | |
| Carson | | | | Ashley Benson | | | |
| Brooke | | | | Cassandra Scerbo | | | |
| Penn | | | | Michael Copon | | | |
| Chelsea | | | | Jennifer Tisdale | | | |
| Aeysha | | | | Anniese Taylor Dendy | | | |
| Ruben | | | | Noel Areizaga | | | |
| Sarah | | | | Kierstin Koppel | | | |
| Catalina "Lina" Cruz | | | | | Christina Milian | | |
| Avery Whitbourne | | | | | Rachele Brooke Smith | | |
| Evan Whitbourne | | | | | Cody Longo | | |
| Gloria | | | | | Vanessa Born | | |
| Treyvonetta | | | | | Gabrielle Dennis | | |
| Sky | | | | | Holland Roden | | |
| Destiny | | | | | | Cristine Prosperi | |
| Hannah | | | | | | Sophie Vavasseur | |
| Blake | | | | | | Jordan Rodrigues | |
| Cheer Goddess | | | | | | Vivica A. Fox | |
| Abby Synger | | | | | | | Kerri Medders |
| McKayla Miller | | | | | | | Tiera Skovbye |
| Principal Simmons | | | | | | | Missi Pyle |

== Stage musical ==
The film series expanded its reach when it was made into Bring It On: The Musical, with music by Lin-Manuel Miranda and Tom Kitt, and lyrics by Miranda and Amanda Green. The play also has a book written by Jeff Whitty.
