= Kora =

Kora may refer to:

== Places ==
=== India ===
- Kora, Bardhaman, West Bengal
- Kora, Bharuch, Gujarat
- Korha, Katihar, also known as Kora, in Bihar
- Kora, Kendrapara, Odisha
- Kora, Wardha, Maharastra
- Kora, Tumakuru, Karnataka
- Toyaguda, Adilabad, Telangana, formerly called Kora

=== Elsewhere ===
- Kora, Burkina Faso, a town in Bam Province, Burkina Faso
- Kora, Ethiopia, a town in central Ethiopia
- Kora, Jhelum, a village in Jhelum District, Pakistan
- Kora, Jindires, a village in Afrin District, Syria
- Kureh, Markazi, a village in Markazi Province, Iran, also known as Kora
- Kōra, Shiga, a town in Shiga Prefecture, Japan
- Kora National Park, Coast Province, Kenya
- Kora, Mali, a village in Mopti, Mali

== Music ==
- Kora (instrument), a stringed musical instrument of West African origin
- Kora Awards, music awards for African music
- Kora (band), a New Zealand reggae band
  - Kora (album), released in 2007

== Buildings ==
- Kōra taisha, a Shinto shrine in Fukuoka prefecture, Japan
- Kora Temple, a Masonic building in Lewiston, Maine

== Languages ==
- Kora or Aka-Kora language, formerly spoken in the Andaman Islands, India
- !Kora or Korana language, spoken in South Africa
- Kora or Koda language, spoken in India and Bangladesh

== People ==
- Kora people, also Cora or Aka-Kora, an indigenous tribe of the Andaman Islands
- Kora (tribe), an indigenous tribe of India and Bangladesh
- Kora of Sicyon (fl. c. 650 BC), first female artist for whom there is evidence
- Kora Boufflert (born 1966), French racewalker
- Kora Karvouni (born 1980), Greek stage and television actress
- Bil Aka Kora (born 1971), musician from Burkina Faso
- Kengo Kora (born 1987), Japanese actor
- Olga Jackowska (1951–2018), a Polish rock singer and songwriter known as Kora

== Other uses ==
- Kora class corvette, a type of ship used by the Indian Navy
  - INS Kora (P61), lead ship of the class
- Kora (pilgrimage), a type of pilgrimage in the Tibetan Buddhist tradition
- Made in Japan: Kora!, a 2011 Japanese film directed by Banmei Takahashi
- KORA-FM, a radio station in Bryan, Texas
- Kora (gastropod), genus of land snails
- Kora (FinTech), a pan-African payment infrastructure.
- Kora (sword), Nepalese blade

== See also ==
- Kora kora, a traditional canoe in the Moluccas, Indonesia
- Koras or Kurash or Köräş, a wrestling sport of Central Asia
- Khôra, a Greek philosophical term or the territory of an Ancient Greek polis outside the city proper
- Cora (disambiguation)
- Possible variant or similar spellings of place names in India:
  - Koda (disambiguation), variant spelling of Kora
  - Korha (disambiguation)
  - Korra (disambiguation)
  - Khori (disambiguation)
  - Khora (disambiguation)
- Kura, a territorial division
