= Korra (disambiguation) =

Korra is the lead character of the animated television series The Legend of Korra.

Korra may also refer to:

== Places ==
=== India ===
- Korra, Alluri Sitharama Raju district, Andhra Pradesh, a village
- Korra, Jehanabad, Bihar, a town
- Korra, Muzaffarpur, Bihar, a village
- Korra, Patna, Bihar, a village
- Korra, Pashchimi Singhbhum, Jharkhand, a village

=== Tibet ===
- Korra, Tibet, a village

== People ==
- Korra Garra, Ethiopian writer, linguist, and agriculturalist
- Korra Obidi (born 1991), Nigerian dancer, singer-songwriter, and model
- Monika Kørra (born 1989), Norwegian author and athlete

== Other ==
- Foxtail millet (Setaria italica), a species of millet known in India (Telugu language) as korra

== See also ==
- Kora (disambiguation)
- Korha (disambiguation)
- Khora (disambiguation)
- Cora (disambiguation)
- Quora, a website
