= Sechiari family =

Greek noble merchant family from Chios

Sechiari
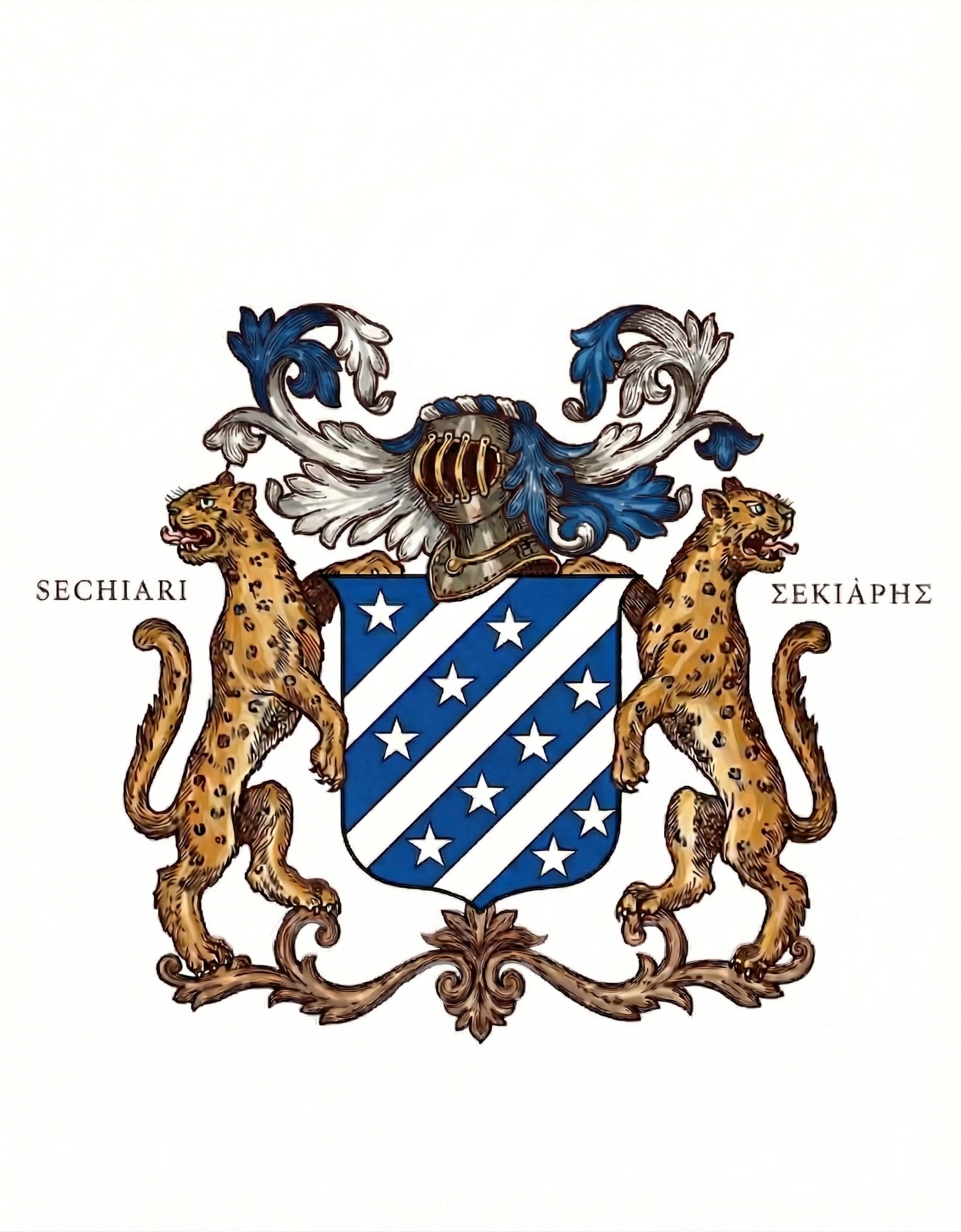
- Country: Ottoman Empire, France, United Kingdom, Romania
- Current region: London, Athens, Aix-en-Provence, Istanbul
- Origin: Chios (present-day Greece), probably from Modena (Italy)
- Titles: Archontes of Chios · Phanariotes · Chrysobullati (holders of Imperial Golden Bulls) · Barons of the Holy Roman Empire
- Estate: Château de la Mignarde (Aix-en-Provence)
- Branches: Marseille branch · Constantinople branch · Romania branch · London branch

The Sechiari family (Greek: Σεκιάρης, Sekiaris) is a dynasty of the Greek merchant nobility originating from the island of Chios. It is ranked among the Families of the Twenty (Greek: Εικοσάδα), the twenty most eminent families of Chiote aristocracy, in Philip Argenti's Libro d'Oro de la Noblesse de Chio. It is also classified among the Phanariotes in Mihail-Dimitri Sturdza's Dictionnaire historique et généalogique des grandes familles de Grèce, d'Albanie et de Constantinople.

First documented in Chios in 1629, the family established commercial and banking houses in Marseille, the Danubian Principalities, England, Calcutta, and New Zealand, before and after 1821. In a confidential report submitted to Baring Brothers in 1860, which ranked all Greek commercial houses in the City of London, the firm Argenti Sechiari & Co. was placed in the top tier (first rate), with a capital estimated at "at least £500,000 sterling".

In the nineteenth century, the Sechiari played a significant role in the modernisation of Romania: in 1871, the banking house Sechiari Rodocanachi et Deroussi subscribed 4,200,000 lei to the first major Romanian state loan for railway construction, representing 5.4% of the total offer.

Through maternal lines, the Sechiari are directly at the origin of two of the most prominent Chiote merchant dynasties: the Ralli Brothers and the Argenti house.

== Origins ==
=== From Modena to Genoa ===
According to the Libro d'Oro, the Sechiari family is "of Italian origin and probably from the city of Modena."

Philip Argenti proposed that the name Sechiari may be a Turkish deformation of Zaccaria — the Genoese family that exercised sovereign lordship over Chios in the fourteenth century, before the Maona of Chios and Phocaea, and of which no trace is found in Greece after that period. Members of the Zaccaria dynasty held titles including kings of Asia Minor and ruling princes of Achaia. Argenti cited several genealogists specialising in Greek noble families in support of this theory: "it may well be that the family name Sechiari is nothing other than a deformation of the true disappeared name", which he suggested could be "the transcription into Turkish of the name Zaccaria." If this hypothesis is correct, the Sechiari would descend from the former sovereign lords of the island.

=== Settlement in Chios ===
Chios was administered by the Genoese from 1346 to 1566 under the Maona of Chios and Phocaea. Several families of Genoese and Italian origin settled there permanently, forming alliances with established Byzantine Greek families. From 1566, Chios became a privileged province of the Ottoman Empire.

The earliest documented mention of the Sechiari in Chios dates to 1629: the name of Pantaleon Sechiari appears in the codex of the Latin bishopric of the island. In 1636, the same codex records Jean Sechiari and his wife Angèle.

== Noble status ==
=== Families of the Twenty ===
The Sechiari belong to the Twenty (Greek: Εικοσάδα), the official designation of the twenty most noble families of Chios as established in the Libro d'Oro de la Noblesse de Chio. The Libro d'Oro states that they "were always regarded in Chios as a noble and very ancient family."

=== Phanariote status ===
The Sechiari are classified among the Phanariotes — Christian Orthodox families heirs to Byzantine aristocracy gravitating around the Ecumenical Patriarchate of Constantinople — by Mihail-Dimitri Sturdza, who notes that "their documented lineage goes back to the end of the seventeenth century, but their prominence dates from later, thanks to a fortune displayed with profusion, derived from the revenues of the trading posts and banking houses established in Marseille, in the Romanian principalities and in England, well before 1821."

=== Archontes of Chios ===
The Sechiari belong to the Chiote aristocracy designated under the term of archontes, the notable families who governed the island under Ottoman administration. The family is cited among the great families of the Chian diaspora by the municipality of Chios. A street in the town of Chios bears the family name.

== Heraldic arms ==
Azure, three bars argent accompanied by ten mullets of five points of the same, placed 1, 3, 4, 2. Supporters: two leopards counter-rampant, proper. Helmet: in profile with four bars. Mantling: argent and azure.

The arms of the Sechiari are documented in the academic monograph Chios dicta est... et in Aegæo sita mari (Archaeopress, Oxford, 2021), which reproduces several photographs taken at the Kampos of Chios, notably at the Casino Sechiari (pl. 8a) and the Sechiari estate (pl. 20b). The journal The Coat of Arms of the Heraldry Society noted that the arms of the Sechiari, Schilizzi, and Vouro families share a similar structure, "probably attesting to a kinship between these families."

== History ==
=== Eighteenth century ===
An Itinerary of the Patriarch of Jerusalem Chrysanthos, who visited Chios in May 1725, records among the benefactors of the Church of the Holy Sepulchre Savas and Paraskevas Sechiari, as well as Marouka, wife of Christopoulis Sechiari and sister of the Metropolitan of Adrianople Clement. Several Sechiari were established in Constantinople and are recorded from 1778 to 1862 among the most distinguished members of the Chiote community of that city.

=== Massacre of Chios (1822) ===
In 1822, in reprisal against the Greek insurrection, Ottoman forces carried out the Chios massacre. According to the Libro d'Oro, some family members perished: Paraskevas Sechiari "was taken hostage and hanged in 1822 by the Turks, along with Christopoulis Sechiari, known above all for his fortune."

Paraskeva Sechiari, patriarch of the surviving branch, escaped from Chios with his sons, reaching Syros and then Marseille. In July 1822, the Sechiari sons — including Étienne and Hippas — were among the first Chiote children to enrol in the school opened in Marseille for refugees from the island.

=== Commercial and banking network ===
Within a few decades, the Sechiari established one of the most geographically extensive commercial houses of the Greek diaspora. Historians Maria-Christina Chatziioannou and Gelina Harlaftis describe the firm as exemplifying the model of the "great Greek firm": a transnational structure integrating commerce, maritime transport, and banking. The firm Argenti Sechiari & Co. operated offices in Manchester (Peter Street), London (Finsbury Circus), Marseille, Calcutta, and New Zealand, where Sechiari Bros. and Co. appeared among the agents of the Commercial Union Assurance Company.

The British census of 1841 records Stephen Sechiari (aged 25) residing at Finsbury Circus with his brothers Ambrose and John, within the cluster of Chiote merchant houses — Ralli at no. 26, Argenti and Rodocanachi at neighbouring addresses. These families revolved around the Baltic Exchange and Lloyd's of London, the principal centres of world maritime trade.

In the confidential report submitted to Baring Brothers in 1860, which classified all Greek firms in the City of London into four tiers of financial credibility, Argenti, Sechiari & Co. was placed in the top tier (first rate), with the notation: "Capital at least 500,000 sterling pounds." The fortune of Baring Brothers themselves was then estimated at two million pounds, and that of the Rothschilds at eight million. The nine Chiote houses in the top category collectively represented a financial weight comparable to that of the Rothschilds.

Theodore Sechiari (1817–1885), head of the London firm Sechiari Brothers, is recurrently listed in the Lloyd's Register of Shipping as one of the major ship charterers of his era, controlling, in coordination with the Chios network, a substantial share of Black Sea grain exports to Western European markets.

The archives of the Lloyd's Register also document a transition toward maritime finance and insurance. Parasqueva Sechiari served as co-liquidator of the Archangel Marine Insurance Company in the 1880s, and the family invested in steam-powered vessels at the turn of the twentieth century, including the SS Ariadne in 1904. In 1908, G. P. Sechiari served as a director of the Imperial Russian Cotton and Jute Factory, Limited, at 19 Cullum Street, London EC.

The continuity of the house into the Second World War is attested by correspondence held at the Churchill Archives Centre, Churchill College, Cambridge, under the reference GBR/0014/SPRS 3/1/33: exchanges dated 1945–1946 between the Spears family and the stockbrokers Argenti, Sechiari and Company.

=== Role of the Sechiari in the major Chiote dynasties ===
The two most prominent Chiote merchant dynasties of the nineteenth century were directly linked to the Sechiari by blood. The mother of the celebrated Ralli Brothers was Julia Sechiari. The mother of Ambroise Argenti (1804–1871), founder of the house Argenti Sechiari & Co., was Marouko Sekiari, sister of Julia Sechiari. Both houses that dominated Greek global commerce in the nineteenth century — Ralli Brothers, with a fortune estimated at £1.8 million in 1860, and Argenti Sechiari & Co. — thus descended, through their respective founders, from Sechiari mothers.

== Historic properties in Chios ==
In the city of Chios, the Sechiari resided in the Engremos and Apletaria quarters. In the Kampos of Chios, they held several properties near Vasileioniakos, where their church of Saint George of the Sechiari was located. They also possessed a Casino — an aristocratic club reserved for the island's notables — as well as properties adjacent to those of the Argenti and Carali families. At least seven distinct properties formerly belonging to the Sechiari in the Kampos have been documented by historians Zolotas, Smith, and Mastorakis.

=== Sekiari House of Patmos ===
In the Chora of Patmos, a historic residence has borne the family name since its construction in 1799 by Zannis Sinetos Sekiaris, a wealthy merchant who merged three pre-existing buildings into a single property. The Sekiari House underwent a complete restoration in recent years; the renovation was covered by The New York Times and Elle Decor.

== Family branches ==
=== Marseille branch ===
After 1822, the family settled in Marseille, where it played a founding role in the life of the Greek Orthodox community. Georges Sechiari (born 14 May 1803 in Chios; died 30 September 1884 in Marseille), administrator of the Caisse d'Épargne de Marseille, represents the Marseille anchor of the family. His brother Étienne Sechiari (1806–1876) was among the founding members and benefactors of the Greek Orthodox Church of the Dormition, the oldest Orthodox church in France. The family is also mentioned in the archives of the Greek Orthodox Cathedral of Paris.

The Marseille branch is currently represented by Emmanuel Sechiari (born 1947), son of Alberte de Campou de Grimaldi-Régusse, and his wife Sabine Bretteville (born 1954).

Through this alliance, the branch is connected to the du Laurens d'Oiselay lineage, an ancestor of which, Sébastien du Laurens, was ennobled in 1614 by the Prince of Orange. In 1642, Emperor Ferdinand III granted to this lineage the title of Baron of the Holy Roman Empire, with the provision that the title should pass through both the male and female line — a rare dispensation subsequently confirmed in France by a decree of the Royal Council of State of Louis XIV in September 1669.

=== London branch ===
==== Settlement and early years ====
From the 1820s and 1830s, the Sechiari established a presence in London alongside their Marseille base. The British census of 1841 documents this: Stephen Sechiari (aged 25) resided at Finsbury Circus with his brothers Ambrose and John, within the cluster of the major Chiote merchant houses, including Ralli at no. 26, Argenti, and Rodocanachi at neighbouring addresses.

Ambrose (Paraskeva) Sechiari (1812–1876), knight of the Order of the Redeemer, founded and structured the London commercial presence. Established in Marseille around 1835, he traded regularly between Marseille and London and founded before 1844 the firm Argenti Sechiari & Co. The Lloyd's Register of Shipping of 1855 records him among its subscribers at "Finsbury-circus", and that of 1860 under the entry "Calcutta." The British census of 1861 places Ambrose Sechiari in Liverpool (18 Lockerby Road, West Derby), as the immediate neighbour of the John P. Schilizzi family, illustrating the interconnection of Chiote dynasties within the British diaspora.

==== Paraskeva George Sechiari (1836–1900) ====
The central figure of the London branch was Paraskeva George Sechiari (born 10 November 1836 in Constantinople; died 11 July 1900 at The Poplars, Newlands, Edgware, London). Son of George (Paraskeva) Sechiari, he married, on 30 June 1863, Marietta Argenti (née Argenti, 1843–1924) at the chapel of Notre-Sauveur in Finsbury Circus, one of the first Greek Orthodox chapels in London.

He was a partner of the firm Sechiari Brothers and Co., domiciled at 4 Bishopsgate Street, alongside Pandely George Sechiari, Parasqueva Ambrose Sechiari, Parasqueva Theodore Sechiari, and Constantine Deroussi, until the dissolution of the partnership on 31 December 1889. His mandates included:

- Director of the Archangel Marine Insurance Company (Limited) (The Pall Mall Gazette, 8 July 1873); then co-liquidator of this company with Emanuel Antonio Mavrogordato, Peter Pandia Rodocanachi, and Theodore Emanuel Schilizzi (London Gazette, 31 December 1880 and 18 August 1885);
- Investor in the International Bank of London Limited (London Gazette, 25 February 1880);
- Member of the Baltic Exchange, attested in 1886;
- Chairman of the Gascoyne (Murchison) Gold Fields Exploring Company, Limited (London Gazette, 28 June 1898);
- Co-liquidator of Venezuelan Mines, Limited, at 6 Great Winchester Street (London Gazette, 23 March 1897).

In February 1878, Parasqueva George Sechiari was among the members of a delegation of Greek merchants received by Lord Derby, Foreign Secretary, to defend the interests of Greek traders in London threatened by tensions between Greece and the Ottoman Empire.

He died on 11 July 1900 in Edgware and was interred on 14 July 1900 in the West Norwood Cemetery, Hellenic section (plot no. 10060), where his funerary monument is shared with the Argenti and Schilizzi families.

==== Role in the Greek community of London ====
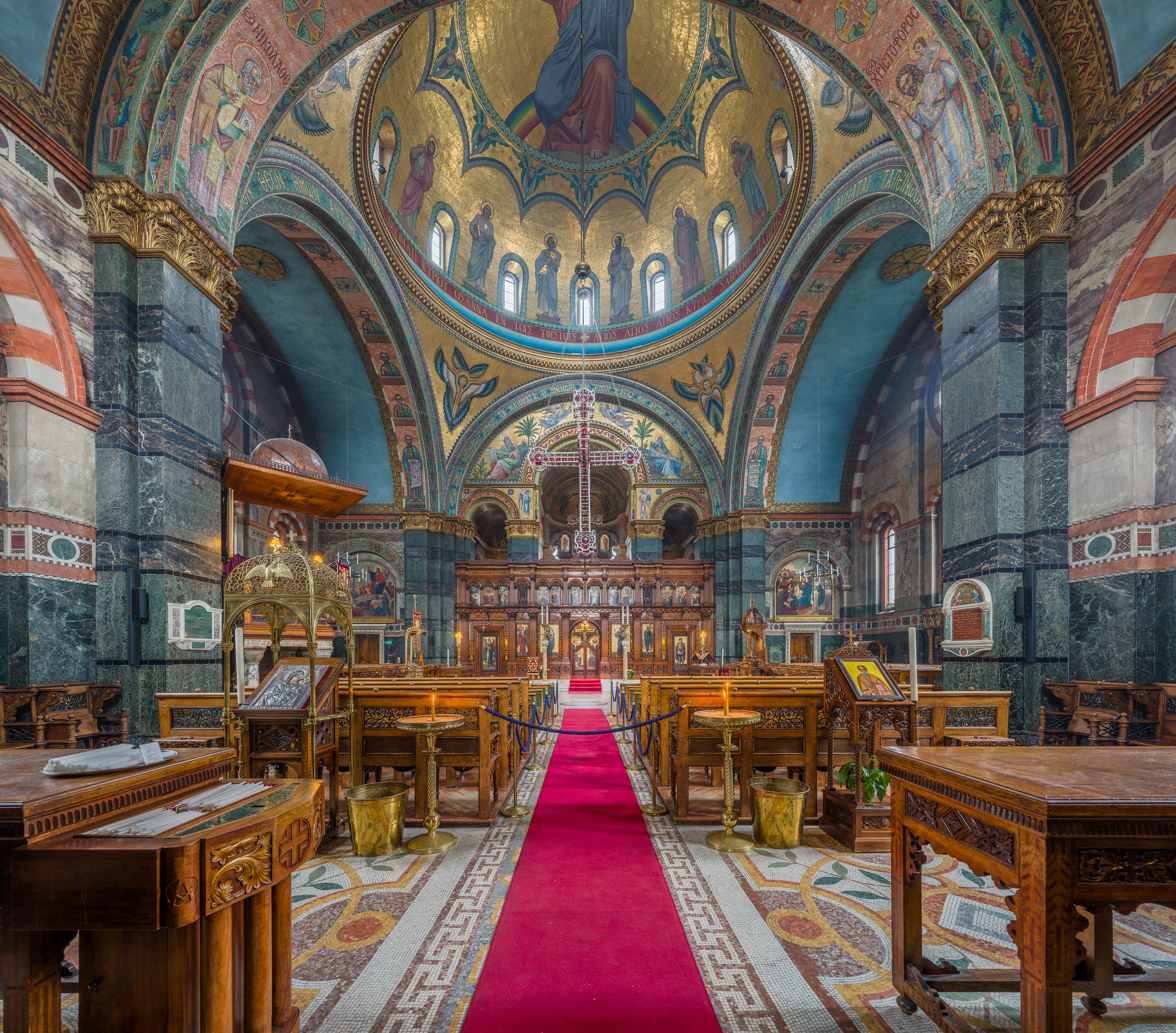
Interior of Saint Sophia's Greek Orthodox Cathedral, London, consecrated 1882.

In January 1874, the general assembly of the Greek Orthodox community of London decided to build a new church at Bayswater. A construction committee was formed including Paraskevas Sechiaris, alongside Emmanuel Mavrocordatos, Constantine Ionidis, Petros Rodocanachi, Dimitrios Schilizzi, and the British solicitor Edwin Freshfield. Over three years, £50,000 was raised from the prosperous Greek merchant and banking community of London. The Cathedral of Saint Sophia in Bayswater, designed by John Oldrid Scott in the Neo-Byzantine style, was consecrated on 5 February 1882.

==== West Norwood Cemetery ====
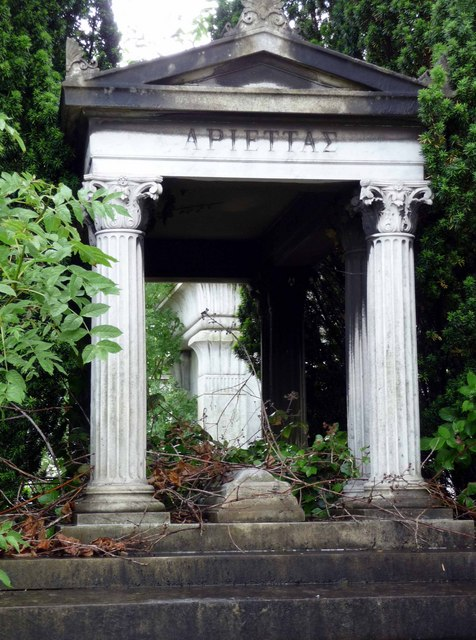
The Sechiari mausoleum in the Greek Orthodox section of West Norwood Cemetery, London.

West Norwood Cemetery, one of the Magnificent Seven cemeteries of London, houses the Greek Orthodox section acquired by the community in 1842. The Sechiari family possesses its mausoleum there (plot no. 10060), shared with the Argenti family, bearing the names of Parasqueva George Sechiari (1836–1900), several of his children who died in infancy, and members of the Argenti and Schilizzi families. Several members of the Theodore Sechiari lineage (Marseille branch), settled in London in later life, are also interred there: Arghyro Sechiari (married Argenti, 1851–1919), Fanny Sechiari (married Mavrogordato, 1854–1920), Virginie Sechiari (1861–1926), and Emmanuel "Manoli" Sechiari (1858–1918).

==== Matrimonial alliances in London ====
Zambelou (Ambrose) Sechiari (known as "Isabella"; born Marseille 21 April 1853; died The Homewood, Esher, Surrey, 19 October 1913), daughter of Ambrose (Paraskeva) Sechiari, married Alexander "Aleco" Ionides (born 1840) on 14 September 1875. The Ionides family was then one of the most prominent Greek merchant dynasties of Victorian London, whose residence was frequented by James McNeill Whistler, Dante Gabriel Rossetti, and Edward Burne-Jones.

From the Constantinople branch, Virginia (Pandia) Sechiari (born 5 September 1849 in Constantinople), daughter of Pandia (Paraskeva) Sechiari and Hypatia Schilizzi, settled in London where she married the merchant John Stefanovich Schilizzi. Their daughter Hélène Schilizzi (born 18 September 1873 in Bayswater; died Paris, 7 September 1959), whose maternal grandmother was Hypatia P. Sechiari, married on 15 September 1921 in London the Greek Prime Minister Eleftherios Venizelos, architect of the Treaty of Lausanne. A prominent philanthropist, Hélène had in 1917 endowed the Koraes Chair of Modern Greek and Byzantine history at King's College London, whose first holder was the historian Arnold J. Toynbee (1919–1924). She was wounded in an assassination attempt against Venizelos in 1933 and published her memoirs À l'ombre de Vénizélos in 1955. Her house at 51 Upper Brook Street, Mayfair, subsequently became the residence of the Greek Ambassador to London. The Schilizzi Foundation, which bears her name, continues to fund scholarships for Greek students at King's College London.

==== The Sechiari family in the National Portrait Gallery ====
Several members of the family appear in the collections of the National Portrait Gallery in London. Marietta Sechiari (née Argenti, 1843–1924), wife of Paraskeva George Sechiari and daughter of Ambroise Argenti, was photographed by Camille Silvy on 28 March 1861 (NPG Ax52147). Jenny Rodocanachi (née Zenni Sechiari, 1842–1927), daughter of George Sechiari and wife of the banker Peter Pandia Rodocanachi, is represented by two portraits made on 23 December 1860 by Silvy (NPG Ax51216 and NPG Ax51217). Other members of the family — "Miss Sechiari" (NPG Ax60376) and "A. Sechiari" (NPG Ax61034) — also appear in the same collection, within the Camille Silvy Collection.

==== Restructuring and later years (1889–1946) ====
In 1889, the dissolution of Sechiari Brothers and Co. in its original form marked the end of an era; continuation was ensured by Paraskeva George Sechiari with Pandely George Sechiari alone. During the financial crisis of 1929, editions of the London Gazette from 1929 to 1933 record difficulties experienced by certain branches, particularly through their involvement in the banking house Rodocanachi, Sons & Co., which suffered heavily under the impact of the Great Depression.

=== Constantinople branch ===
Pandia Sechiari (1816–1880), born in Chios to Paraskeva Sechiari and Arghyro Ralli, married Hypatia Schilizzi and died in Istanbul on 18 January 1880. He is interred in the Sechiari-Schilizzi mausoleum at the Zoodohos Pigi church of Baloukli, one of the most sacred sites of the Eastern Orthodox Church and the principal burial place of eminent families of the Greek Orthodox community of Constantinople, alongside several Ecumenical Patriarchs.

=== Romania branch ===
Issue of the Telegraphulŭ de Bucuresci of 4 August 1871, publishing the list of subscribers to the national loan, including the Sechiari house for 4,200,000 lei.

==== State finance and railway construction ====
Although the Sechiari's principal capital and decision-making centre were in Marseille, the family exercised a determining influence on the modernisation of Romania through its Bucharest branch and its trading networks at Brăila.

In August 1871, the Romanian state launched a national loan of 78 million lei for the creation of a railway network. The banking house Sechiari Rodocanachi et Deroussi subscribed 4,200,000 lei to this loan, representing 5.4% of the total offer — placing the firm among the leading financial institutions of the period, alongside the Bank of Romania (6.5 million lei) and ahead of other major houses such as that of the Halfon brothers (3.8 million lei).

==== Commerce and philanthropy ====
The Sechiari's role in Romania extended to the grain trade, a pillar of the national economy. Established at Brăila under the firm name Sechiari Frères, they also engaged in local philanthropy, as evidenced by a donation in 1882 to the local agricultural committee to fund prizes at the autumn exhibitions.

In January 1886, the international firm Sechiari et Deroussi, headquartered in Marseille, liquidated all its operations on the Marseille and Bucharest markets. The operation was supervised by Em. Th. Sechiari for the French side and by C. Deroussi for the Romanian branch.

==== Political Involvement (1895–1896) ====
The family's economic influence translated into involvement in Romanian political life. In the late nineteenth century, the Sechiari (often listed as Sechiaris) were prominent figures in the National Liberal Party in Covurlui County (Galați). A family member occupied the position of prefect of this county, a strategically important post for the control of the major grain port of Galați.

In 1895, during elections for the third electoral college, the Sechiari candidate refused to withdraw his candidacy under government pressure. The following year, as a former prefect and local liberal leader, he travelled to Bucharest to report publicly to the government on fraud orchestrated by the mayor of Galați (the Malaxa affair), an action that led to judicial investigations and the removal of the corrupt administration.

=== Claim of Byzantine imperial descent ===
According to Emmanuel Sechiari, interviewed in Lys de Provence in 1984, the family claims descent through the Rodocanachi — via Marie Rodocanachi, wife of Theodore Sechiari — from Andronicos Doukas, described as "the direct or collateral ancestor of the Byzantine Emperor Constantine X Doukas (1059–1067)."

== Matrimonial alliances ==
=== Ralli ===
Paraskeva Sechiari married Arghyro Ralli; Julia Sechiari was the mother of the Ralli Brothers.

=== Schilizzi ===
Pandia Sechiari (1816–1880) married Hypatia Schilizzi. Their granddaughter Hélène Schilizzi (1873–1959) married the Greek Prime Minister Eleftherios Venizelos on 15 September 1921 in London.

=== Rodocanachi ===
Theodore Sechiari married Marie Rodocanachi. Their children include:

- Arghyro Sechiari (1851–1919), who married George Ambrose Argenti in 1872 in Marseille; died in London and interred at West Norwood Cemetery (Hellenic section);
- Fanny Sechiari (1854–1920), who married Michel George Mavrogordato (1843–1920) in Marseille in 1872; died in London, also interred at West Norwood Cemetery;
- Ariadne Sechiari (1860–1932), who married Nicolas Scanavi Ritter von Scanavi, an ennobled Viennese banker, in Marseille in 1880; died in Vienna;
- Alexandra Sechiari (1866–1951), who married Leonidas Chryssoveloni in Brăila in 1885.

=== Argenti ===
Marouko Sekiari was the mother of Ambroise Argenti (1804–1871), founder of Argenti Sechiari & Co.

=== Ionides ===
Zambelou Sechiari (1853–1913) married Alexander "Aleco" Ionides on 14 September 1875, connecting the Sechiari to one of the most prominent Greek merchant families of Victorian London.

=== Sabran-Pontevès ===
In 2009, Maylis Sechiari, daughter of Emmanuel Sechiari, married the Comte Foulques de Sabran-Pontevès.

== Patrimony ==
=== Château de la Mignarde ===
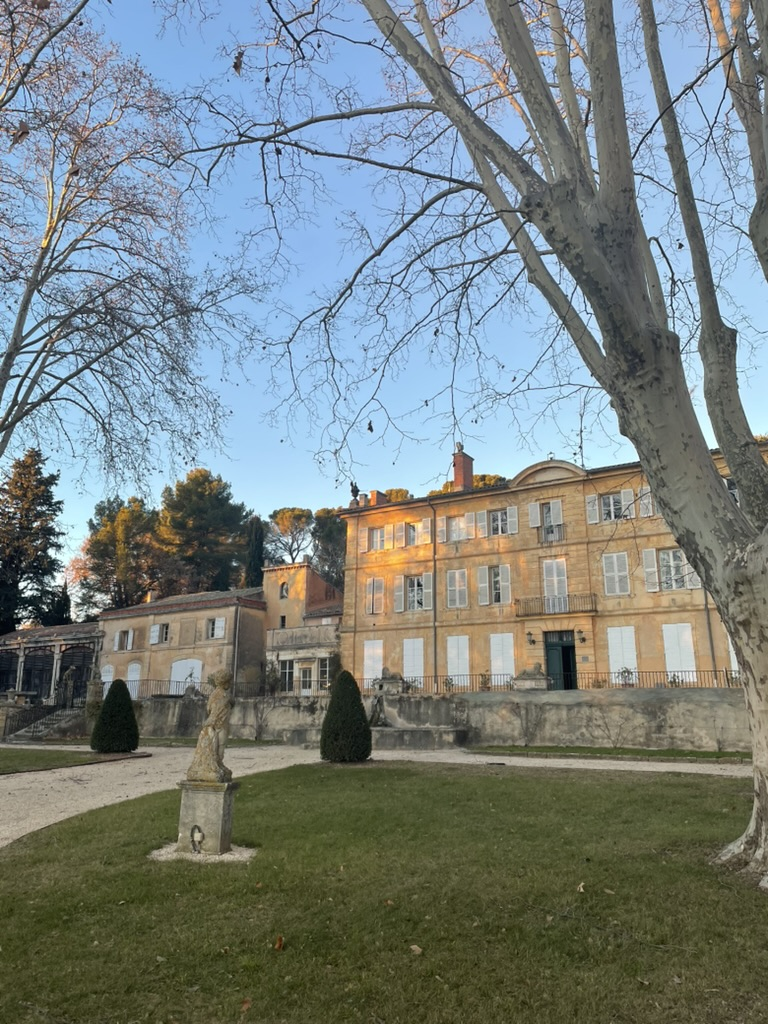
Château de la Mignarde, Aix-en-Provence, listed as a Historic Monument since 1995.

The Provençal branch owns the Château de la Mignarde, a seventeenth-century bastide situated on the Route des Pinchinats in Aix-en-Provence, listed as a Historic Monument by ministerial decree of 12 October 1995. The property received Pauline Borghèse in 1807 and is managed by the Sechiari family within the framework of the Demeure Historique.

=== In the Kampos, Chios ===
The history of the Sechiari (Σεκιάρη) family is linked to several mansions and landed estates, particularly in the fertile Kampos region on the island of Chios, as well as along their settlement paths throughout Europe. According to the detailed study by author and researcher Vasilis Agiannidis, published in the Greek cultural media Aplotaria, the following properties historically associated with the family have been recorded:

Based on historical cadastral and topographical surveys (notably those by Arnold Smith, Mastorakis, and the historian Georgios Zolotas), Vasilis Agiannidis lists seven estates (perivolia) that belonged to the family or its commercial enterprises:

- Agios Isidoros Estate: The estate still houses the church of Agios Georgios Sechiari today. According to historian G. Zolotas, the family owned two distinct orchards there.
- "Deli-Thanasi" or "Kazinaki" Estate (in the heart of the Kampos): Original property of the Sechiaris before passing to the Rafail family. Architectural elements of the old building (predating the great earthquake) are still visible, embedded in the northern perimeter wall.
- "Casino" Estate (in the heart of the Kampos): Original property of the Sechiaris, which later passed under Ottoman control, and then to the Nomikos and Donti families.
- "Gkizaina" Estate (Spiladia sector): Successive property of the Giustiniani, Patrinos, Gkizi, and then Zymni families. According to the surveys of topographer Arnold Smith, this estate was also a property of the Sechiari family.
- Fasolas Estate: Identified in topographical surveys as the property of the commercial company "Sechiari-Nomikos & Co." (Σεκιάρης-Νομικός & Σία).
- Kalampaka Estate: Original property of the Sechiaris, subsequently passing to the Ralli, Tomazou, and then Kypridaki families.
- Christos Estate: Also identified in the cadastral archives as a land property of the commercial company "Sechiari-Nomikos & Co.".

=== Baloukli Mausoleum (Istanbul) ===
The Sechiari-Schilizzi mausoleum is located in the precinct of the Monastery of Baloukli in Istanbul, one of the most sacred sites of the Eastern Orthodox Church, where several Ecumenical Patriarchs are buried.

=== West Norwood Cemetery Mausoleum (London) ===
The family possesses its mausoleum in the Greek Orthodox section of West Norwood Cemetery in London (plot no. 10060), shared with the Argenti and Schilizzi families.

=== Church of Saint George of the Sechiari (Chios) ===
The family possesses its own church in the Kampos of Chios — the Church of Saint George of the Sechiari (Greek: Ιερός Ναός Αγίου Γεωργίου Σεκιάρη). Listed as a historic monument by the Greek government since 1991, it underwent restoration works officially authorised in 2019.

=== Sekiari House of Patmos ===
In the Chora of Patmos, a historic residence has borne the family name since its construction in 1799. It was restored in recent years, and the renovation was covered by The New York Times and Elle Decor.

== Contemporary representatives ==
The Sechiari family is today represented in direct line by the Provençal branch, descended from the lineage Paraskeva (archon of Chios, 1766–1841) → Theodore (archon of Chios, 1817–1885) → Étienne Théodore (archon of Chios, 1871–1955) → Jean Théodore Sechiari (1911–1995, commander, member of the Académie d'Aix) → Emmanuel Sechiari (doctor of law, regional delegate of the Demeure Historique).

== See also ==
- Chios massacre
- Phanariotes
- Château de la Mignarde
- Ralli Brothers
- Kampos of Chios
- Chian diaspora
- Libro d'Oro della Nobiltà di Scio
- Eleftherios Venizelos
- West Norwood Cemetery
