= Pauline Bonaparte =

- Princess of Guastalla; Princess consort of Sulmona and of Rossano
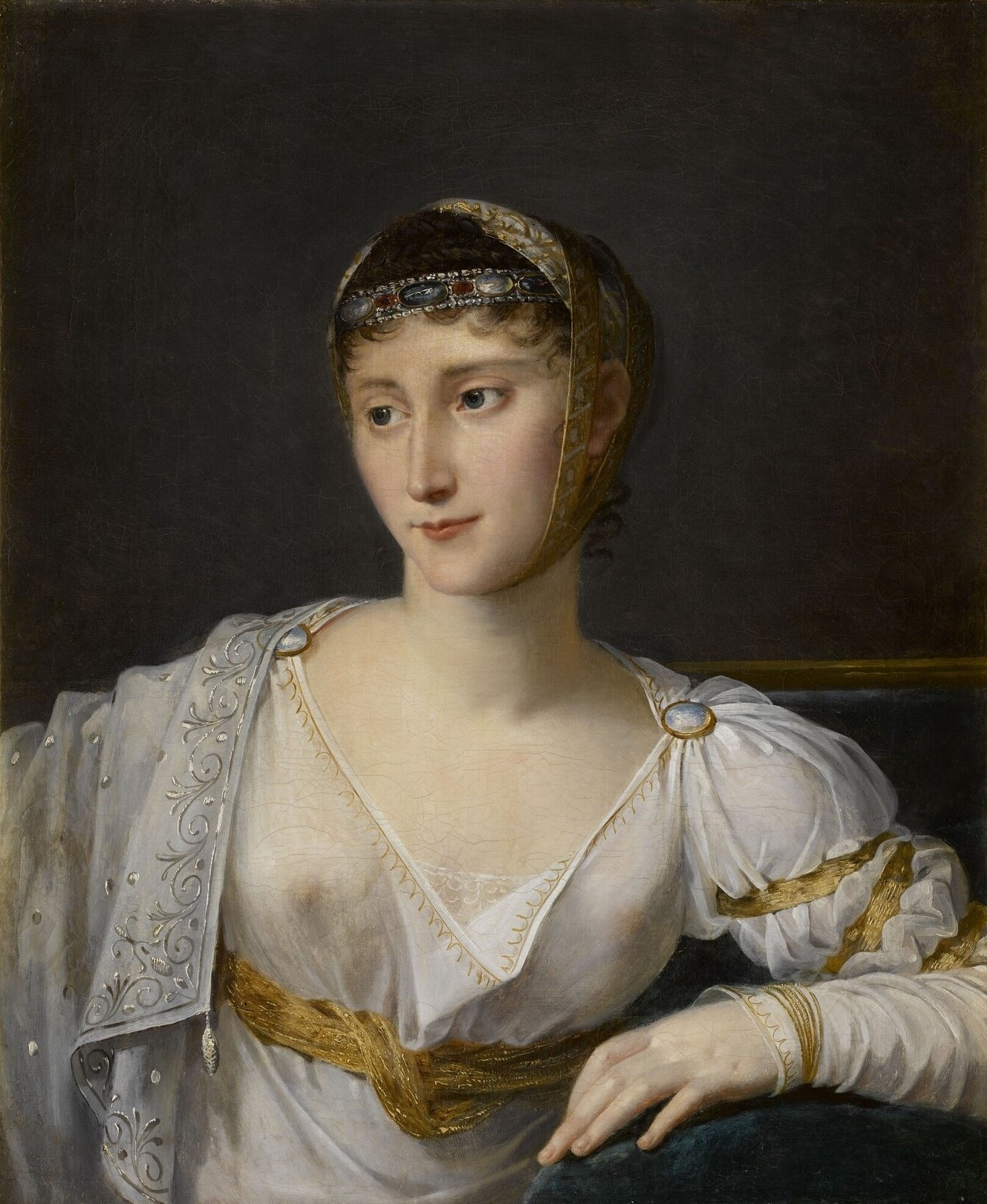

Duchess of Guastalla
- Reign: 30 March 1806 – 14 August 1806
- Predecessor: Ferdinand
- Successor: Duchy annexed by Parma
- Co-ruler: Camillo Borghese
- Born: 20 October 1780; Maison Bonaparte, Ajaccio, Corsica
- Died: 9 June 1825 (aged 44); Florence, Tuscany
- Burial: Basilica of Saint Mary Major, Rome
- Spouses: Charles Leclerc (m. 1797; died 1802) Camillo, 6th Prince of Sulmona (m. 1803)
- Issue: Dermide Leclerc
Names
- Maria Paola Bonaparte
- House: Bonaparte
- Father: Carlo Maria Buonaparte
- Mother: Letizia Ramolino
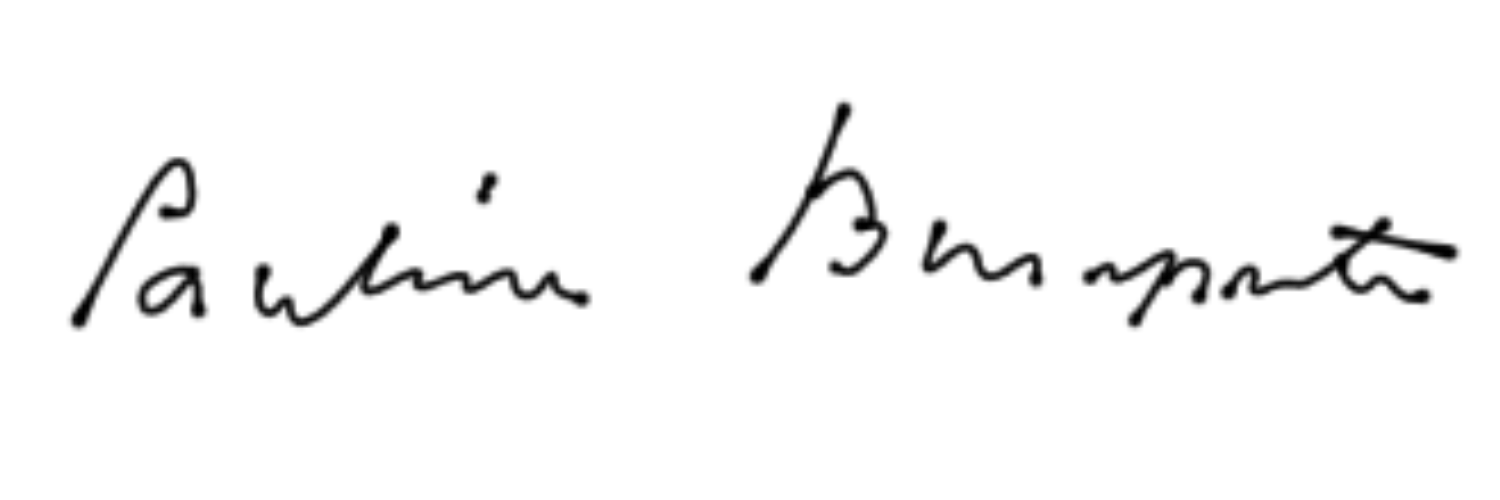
- Signature

Paula Maria Bonaparte Leclerc Borghese (French: Pauline Marie Bonaparte, pronounced [pɔlin maʁi bɔnapaʁt]; 20 October 1780 – 9 June 1825), better known as Pauline Bonaparte, was an imperial French princess, the first sovereign Duchess of Guastalla, and the princess consort of Sulmona and Rossano. She was the sixth child of Letizia Ramolino and Carlo Buonaparte, Corsica's representative to the court of King Louis XVI. Her elder brother, Napoleon, was the first emperor of the French. She married Charles Leclerc, a French general, a union ended by his death in 1802.

Later, Pauline married Camillo Borghese, 6th Prince of Sulmona. Her only child, Dermide Leclerc, born from her first marriage, died in childhood. She was the only Bonaparte sibling to visit Napoleon in exile on his principality, Elba.

== Early life ==
Maria Paola Buonaparte, the sixth child of Letizia Ramolino and Carlo Maria Buonaparte, Corsica's representative to the court of King Louis XVI, was born on 20 October 1780 in Ajaccio, Corsica. She was popularly known as "Paolina" in Italian. Her family soon took also a French spelling of their surname, Bonaparte. She is said to be Napoleon's favorite sister. Little is known about her childhood, except that she received no formal education. Following Carlo's death in 1785, the family was plunged into poverty.

Pauline's brother Lucien Bonaparte made seditious comments at the local Jacobin chapter in the summer of 1793, forcing the family to flee to the mainland. It was there on the mainland that she became known as "Paulette". The income the Bonapartes earned from their vineyards and other holdings on Corsica was interrupted by the British capture of the island in 1794. Their economic situation became so dire that the Bonaparte women reportedly resorted to washing clothes for payment. Regardless, they received, like other French refugees from Corsica, a stipend from the French government. From their landing place, Toulon, they moved to Marseille, where General Napoleon Bonaparte, her elder brother, introduced her to Louis-Marie Stanislas Fréron, the proconsul of Marseille. He intended them to marry, but Letizia objected. Napoleon, despite the fact that Pauline loved Stanislas, married her to General Charles Leclerc in French-occupied Milan on 14 June 1797. Napoleon returned to Paris and delegated the office of commander-in-chief of the French army in Italy to his brother-in-law. Pauline gave birth to a boy, Dermide Louis Napoleon, on 20 April 1798. In celebration, General Leclerc acquired a property outside Novellara worth 160,000 French francs. Ill-health forced Leclerc to resign from his military post in October of the same year; he was transferred to Paris. Leclerc was again relocated upon arrival, this time to Brittany. Pauline stayed in Paris with Dermide. Laure de Permond—the future Duchesse d'Abrantès—and her mother welcomed Pauline into their salon at the rue Saint-Croix. Napoleon seized power in Coup of Brumaire in November 1799: deposing the Directory, he pronounced himself First Consul.

== Saint-Domingue ==
Saint-Domingue in the West Indies (modern-day Haiti) had been a French colony since 1697, but had been in rebellion against France since 1791. Napoleon wished to restore French authority there, and so organized an expedition. He put General Leclerc at its head, appointing him Governor-General of the island. Leclerc, Dermide, and Pauline embarked for the colony from Brest on 14 December 1801. Leclerc's fleet totaled 74 ships. The gubernatorial family occupied the flagship, l'Océan. After a 45-day journey, the fleet arrived in Le Cap harbour. The Governor-General ordered General Christophe, who commanded a force of 5,000 soldiers, to resign Le Cap to French authority. After all attempts at conciliation failed, Leclerc attacked the town under cover of darkness. Christophe responded by razing Le Cap to the ground. Pauline, meanwhile, was left aboard the flagship with their son. According to Leclerc, in a letter dated 5 March to Napoleon, "The disastrous events in the midst of which she [Pauline] found herself wore her down to the point of making her ill." Leclerc succeeded in requisitioning the capitulation of the rebel leader, Toussaint L'ouverture, in May.

However, celebrations were dampened by the advent of yellow fever season: 25 generals and 25,000 soldiers died from the fever. Leclerc had initially guaranteed that slavery, abolished by the Jacobin republic in 1794, would stay proscribed; however, the inhabitants caught wind of its re-establishment in another French colony, neighbouring Guadeloupe, in July. The French government had eliminated slavery in May. As a result, the indigenous residents of Saint-Domingue planned an insurrection for September 16. Black troops in Leclerc's army defected to their old commanders, and the Governor-General had a mere 2,000 men against the rebels' 10,000. Leclerc, fearing for Pauline's safety, gave express orders to Jacques de Norvin, a sergeant, to remove Pauline from Saint-Domingue at a moment's notice, but these precautions proved unnecessary when Leclerc defeated the insurgents.

The climate was taking its toll on Pauline's health. She could no longer walk and was compelled to a "reclining position" for several hours a day. Both she and Dermide suffered from spells of yellow fever. She did, however, find time to take numerous lovers, including several of her husband's soldiers, and developed a reputation for "Bacchanalian promiscuity."

Leclerc attempted to convince Pauline to return to Paris in August. She consented on the condition that "he [Leclerc]...give me 100,000 francs." When the Governor-General refused, she elected to stay in Saint-Domingue; observing that unlike in Paris, "Here, I reign like Josephine [Napoleon's wife]; I hold first place."

To occupy herself, Pauline compiled a collection of local flora and established a menagerie, inhabited by native animals.

On 22 October 1802, Leclerc fell ill. A doctor from the military hospital in Le Cap diagnosed him with a fever "caused by the bodily and mental hardships that the general [Leclerc] had suffered." Biographer Flora Fraser believes that his symptoms were consistent with those of yellow fever. He died on 1 November. Seven days later, Pauline, Dermide, and Leclerc's remains were hastily ferried back to mainland France.

== Princess Borghese ==
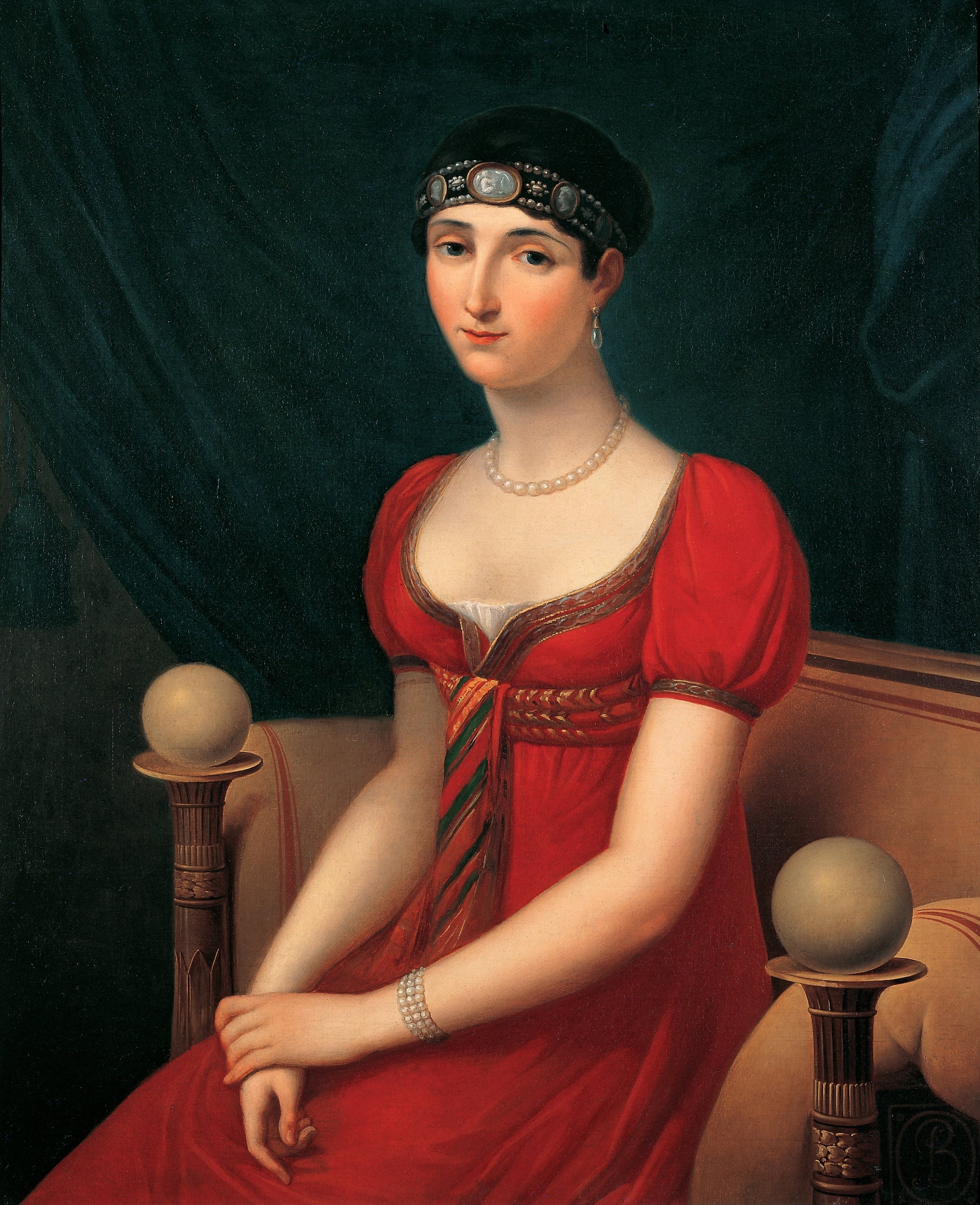
Portrait of Pauline by François-Joseph Kinson, 1808

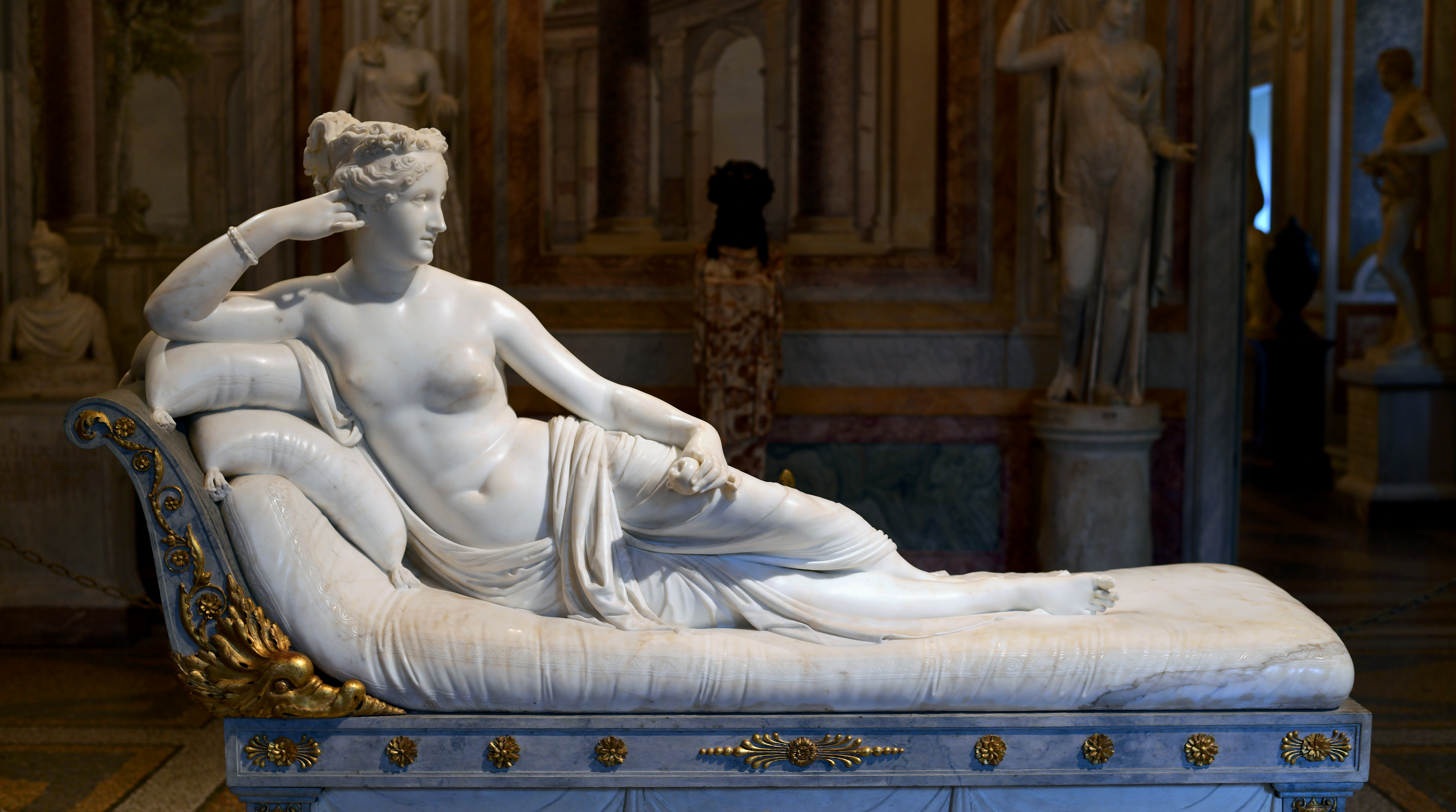
Venus Victrix, by Antonio Canova, depicting Princess Borghese as a deity, created 1804-1808. It was commissioned by her husband.

Pauline reached the Bay of Toulon on 1 January 1803. That same day she wrote to Napoleon: "I have brought with me the remains of my poor Leclerc. Pity poor Pauline, who is truly unhappy."

On 11 February, she arrived in the capital, where Napoleon made arrangements for her to lodge with their brother Joseph. Parisian rumour had it that she extracted gold and jewels from the indigenous peoples in Saint-Domingue and brought the treasure back in Leclerc's sarcophagus, but this was not the case. She inherited 700,000 francs in liquid capital and assets from Leclerc.

Tiring of life with Joseph, Pauline went about acquiring Hôtel Charost from the duchess to whom it belonged. She confided in a friend that she "was bored" with the code of mourning outlined in the First Consul's civil code, compelling her to withdraw from Parisian society, which, before her time in Saint-Domingue, had had her at its center. Napoleon did not wish her to remain unmarried for long; he tried—but failed—to betroth her to the Duke of Lodi and Vice-President of the Napoleonic Republic of Italy, Francesco Melzi d'Eril. Pope Pius VII's envoy, Giovanni Battista Caprara, suggested Camillo Borghese, 6th Prince of Sulmona, a Roman noble. The First Consul believed the union would consolidate ties with French-occupied Italy, where animosity toward the aggressor was rife. That, combined with pressure from her brothers Joseph and Lucien, induced her to marry him. The marriage contract brought Camillo a dowry of 500,000 francs; to Pauline, it brought 300,000 francs worth of jewelry and the use of the Borghese family diamonds. On 28 August 1803, they were married by Caprara, but without the knowledge of Napoleon, who had wanted a November wedding for mourning protocol's sake. Upon discovering Pauline's deceit, he refused to acknowledge her new title: "Please understand, Madame, that there is no princess where I am." A civil ceremony was held in November to confirm the marriage. However, Pauline continued her extramarital affairs, including an affair with the violinist Niccolò Paganini.

Camillo, Pauline, and Dermide arrived in Rome on 14 November. Pauline, anxious to learn how to behave in Roman society, received tutorship in deportment and dancing. Biographer William Carlton suggests that Pauline— a minor noble from Corsica—would never have made such an advantageous match were it not for Napoleon's political eminence. Pauline's initial amity toward Camillo soon morphed into dislike. Her son Dermide, always a delicate child, died on 14 August 1804 in the Aldobrandini villa in Frascati, after a violent fever and convulsions. Three years later, in 1807, his remains were moved next to those of his father in the park grounds of the Château de Montgobert.

== Château de la Mignarde ==
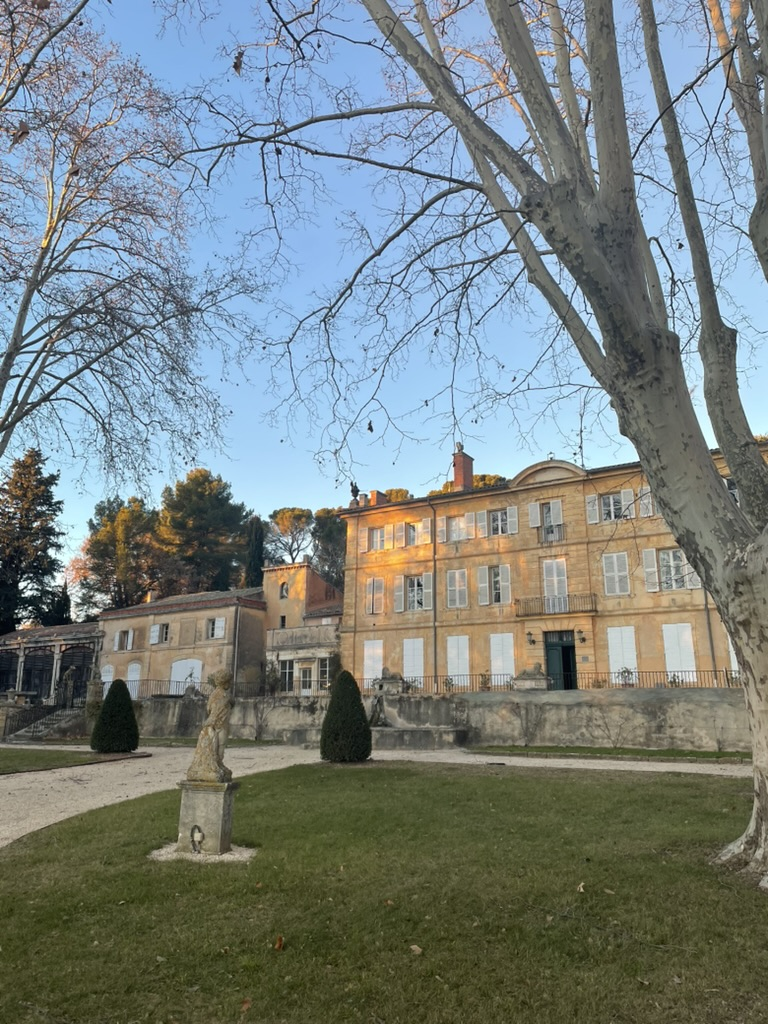
château de la Mignarde

In the summer of 1807, Pauline travelled to Provence to take the waters at Gréoux-les-Bains, and stayed at the château de la Mignarde, a 17th bastide near Aix-en-Provence belonging to Jean-Baptiste Rey, a commissary-general of the Imperial army. It was there that she conducted a well-publicised affair with her chamberlain, Louis Nicolas Philippe Auguste de Forbin, an episode recorded by the prefect of Bouches-du-Rhône, Antoine Claire Thibaudeau, in his memoirs.

Pauline's stay at the Mignarde became a source of local legend. She reportedly had the grounds' ponds beaten with long poles to silence the frogs and cicadas that disturbed her rest, and had a white marble bathtub installed so that she could bathe in donkey milk, "on doctors' orders." The bathtub, resting on four sculpted lion's-paw feet, is still preserved in the house today. She returned to the château again in 1813, by which time her affair with Forbin had cooled, occupying herself instead with overseeing renovations to her Parisian properties by correspondence.

The Mignarde passed in 1850 to Émile Rigaud, mayor of Aix-en-Provence, and has remained in his family ever since; it is today owned by his descendant Sabine Sechiari, of the Sechiari family, Greek archons originally from Chios.

== After Napoleon's fall ==
In 1806, Napoleon made his sister sovereign Princess and Duchess of Guastalla; however, she soon sold the duchy to Parma for six million francs, keeping only the title of Princess of Guastalla. Pauline fell into temporary disfavor with her brother because of her hostility to his second wife, Empress Marie Louise, but when Napoleon's fortune failed, Pauline showed herself more loyal than any of his other sisters and brothers.

Upon Napoleon's fall, Pauline liquidated all of her assets and moved to Elba, using that money to better Napoleon's condition. She was the only Bonaparte sibling to visit her brother during his exile on Elba. Her home in Paris, the Hôtel de Charost, was sold to the British government and used by the Duke of Wellington as his official residence during his tenure as British Ambassador to France. Today the house is still the home of the British ambassador.

After Waterloo Pauline moved to Rome, where she enjoyed the protection of Pope Pius VII (who once was her brother's prisoner), as did her mother, Letizia, (then at a palace on the Piazza Venezia) and other members of the Bonaparte family. Pauline lived in a villa between the Porta Pia and the Porta Salaria that was called Villa Paolina after her and decorated in the Egyptomania style she favored. Her husband, Camillo, lived in the Palazzo Borghese, but then moved to Florence to distance himself from her and had a ten-year relationship with a mistress. Even so, Pauline persuaded the Pope to convince the prince to take her back only three months before her death from pulmonary tuberculosis. She died in his Palazzo Salviati-Borghese in Florence.

== Health ==
Pauline was of frail health for much of her life, probably due to salpingitis. She died on 9 June 1825 at the age of forty-four at the Palazzo Salviati-Borghese in Florence, the cause of death being given as 'tumor on the stomach' but it may have been pulmonary tuberculosis.

== In popular culture ==
- Simone Genevois plays her in the 1927 silent film Napoléon.
- Gladys Holland plays her in the 1952 Haitian-located action film Lydia Bailey.
- Charlotte Austin plays her in the 1954 film Désirée.
- Gianna Maria Canale plays her in the 1955 French film Napoléon.
- Claudia Cardinale plays her in the 1960 French film Austerlitz.
- Laura Valenzuela plays her in the 1961 Italian-French film Madame.
- Gina Lollobrigida plays her in the 1962 French film Venere imperiale.
- Maria Rosaria Omaggio plays her in the 1979 French miniseries Joséphine ou la Comédie des ambitions.
- Ione Skye plays her in the 1987 miniseries Napoleon and Josephine: A Love Story.
- Constance Dollé plays her in the 2002 miniseries Napoléon.
- Yelena Podkaminskaya plays her in the 2006 Russian telenovela Adjutants of Love.
- She is the main character in the 2019 video game Banner of the Maid

== See also ==
- House of Bonaparte

== Bibliography ==
- Carlton, W.N.C.: Pauline: Favourite Sister of Napoleon, London: Thornton Butterworth, 1931 (pre-dates use of ISBN)
- Dixon, Pierson: Pauline: Napoleon's Favourite Sister, London: Collins, 1964
- Fleischmann, Hector: Pauline Bonaparte and Her Lovers: As Revealed by Contemporary Witnesses, by Her Own Love Letters and by the Anti-Napoleonic Pamphleteers, John Lane, The Bodley Head, 1914
- Fraser, Flora: Venus of Empire: The Life of Pauline Bonaparte, London: John Murray, 2009 ISBN 978-0-7195-6110-8
- Ortzen, Len: Imperial Venus: The Story of Pauline Bonaparte-Borghese, London: Constable, 1974
- Weiner, Margery: The Parvenu Princesses: Elisa, Pauline and Caroline Bonaparte, London: John Murray, 1964

Pauline Bonaparte House of Bonaparte Born: 13 June 1673 Died: 15 October 1741
Regnal titles
Preceded by Ferdinand	Duchess of Guastalla; 1806	Duchy annexed by Parma
Italian nobility
Preceded by Anna Maria Salviati	Princess of Sulmona and of Rossano; 1803–1825	Succeeded by Adèle, Countess of La Rochefoucauld
