= Horațiu =

Horațiu is a Romanian male given name that may refer to:

- Horaţiu Badiţă (1976–2014), Romanian swimmer
- Horațiu Cioloboc (born 1967), Romanian footballer
- Horațiu Lasconi (born 1963), Romanian footballer
- Horațiu Mălăele (born 1952), Romanian actor, cartoonist, writer, and theater and film director
- Horațiu Năstase, Romanian physicist and professor
- Horaţiu Nicolau (1933–2018), Romanian volleyball player
- Horațiu Pașca (born 1981), Romanian handball player and coach
- Horațiu Pungea (born 1986), Romanian rugby union footballer
- Horațiu Rădulescu (1942–2008), composer

== See also ==
- Horia (disambiguation)
