= Horia =

Horia or Horea may refer to:

== Places in Romania ==
=== Communes ===
- Horea, Alba
- Horia, Constanța
- Horia, Neamț
- Horia, Tulcea
- Hilișeu-Horia, Botoșani

=== Villages ===
- Horea, in Sanislău, Satu Mare
- Horia, in Vladimirescu, Arad
- Horia, in Surdila-Greci, Brăila
- Horia, in Mitoc, Botoșani
- Horia, in Axintele, Ialomiţa

=== Other places ===
- Horea, Satu Mare, a residential district

== Other uses ==
- Horea, leader of a Romanian revolt in 1784
- Horia (beetle)
- Horia (name), a Romanian given name
- Horia (Bretan), a 1937 opera
- Horia, an opera by Sabin Drăgoi
- Horea, a small river in Romania and Hungary, tributary of the Crasna

== See also ==
- Hora (disambiguation)
- Horațiu
- Horești (disambiguation)
