= Dermide Leclerc =

Only child of Pauline Bonaparte

- Full name: Dermide Louis Napoléon Leclerc
- Born: 20 April 1798; Milan, Cisalpine Republic
- Died: 14 August 1804 (aged 6); Frascati, Rome, Papal States
- Buried: Château de Montgobert
- Father: Charles Leclerc
- Mother: Pauline Bonaparte

Dermide Louis Napoléon Leclerc (20 April 1798 – 14 August 1804) was the only child of Pauline Bonaparte (later suo jure Duchess of Guastalla) and her first husband, French Army general Charles Leclerc. Through his mother, Dermide was a nephew of the future Emperor Napoleon I.

In 1802, during the Haitian Revolution, Dermide arrived on the island-colony of Saint-Domingue with his parents, as part of the Saint-Domingue expedition. After his father's death of yellow fever later during the year, Dermide and Pauline were brought back to France. In 1803, Pauline remarried, this time to Italian nobleman Camillo Borghese, and she took up residence, along with her husband and son, in Rome. Always a frail child, Dermide died of a fever at the age of six, three months after his uncle became Emperor and two years before his mother's proclamation as Duchess of Guastalla.

== Biography ==
=== Early life ===
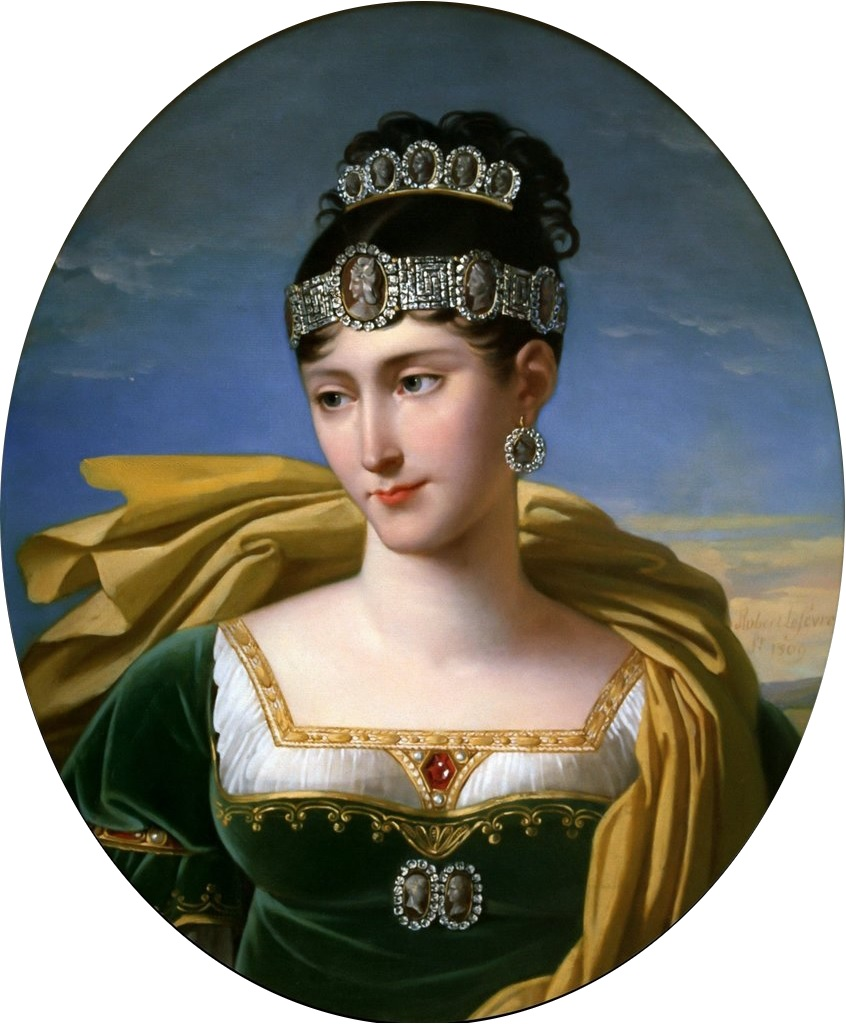
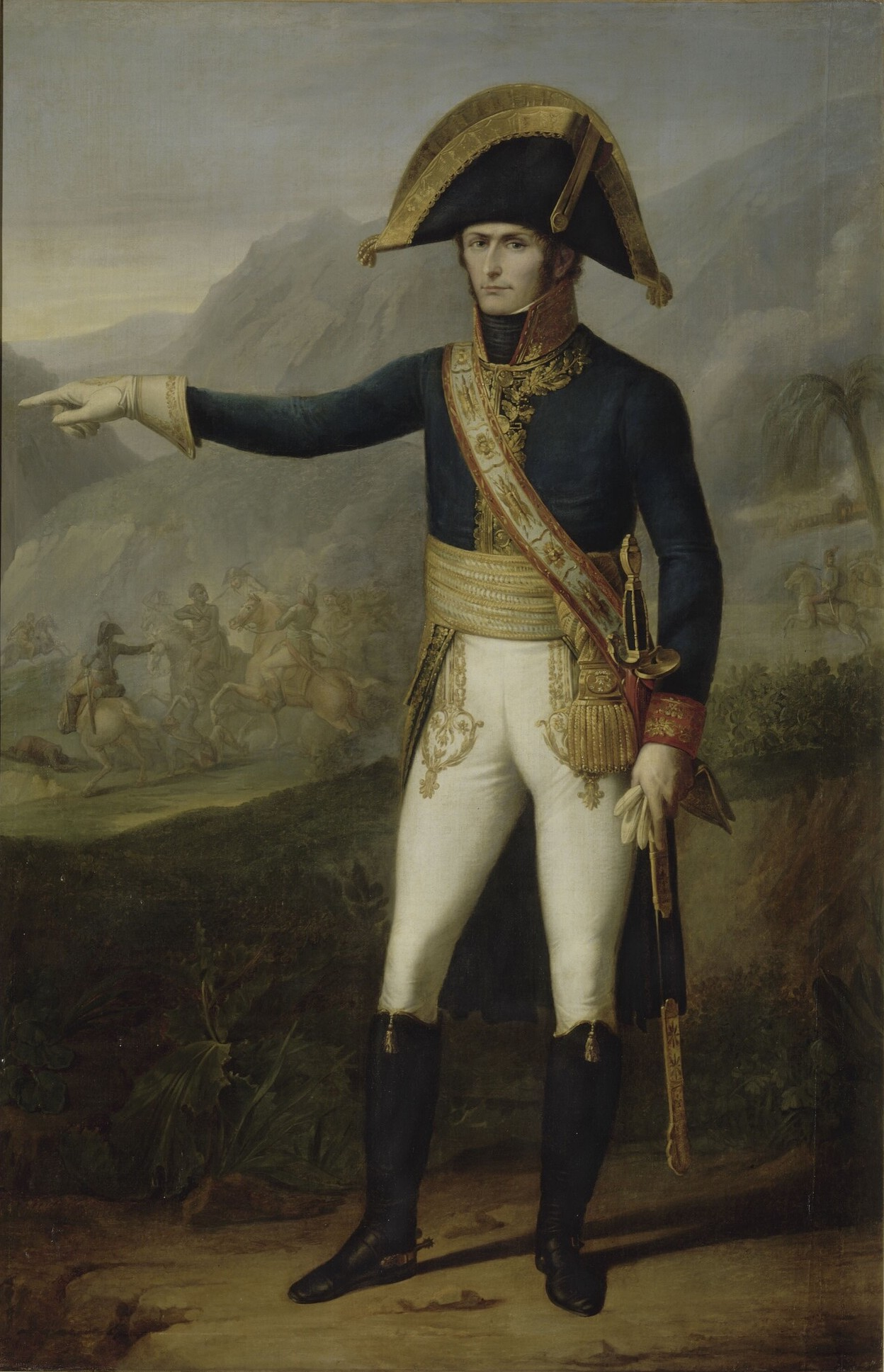
Dermide's parents, Pauline Bonaparte and Charles Leclerc.

Dermide was born on 20 April 1798, in Milan, which was then part of the Cisalpine Republic, a puppet state of the French First Republic. He was the first and only child of his parents, Maria Paola di Buonaparte (known as Pauline) and Charles Victoire Emmanuel Leclerc, a general in the French Army. Dermide's birth was a difficult one, and its effects would be visible in Pauline's health for many years. He was christened Dermide Louis Napoléon, after a character in the (in fact spurious) epic Gaelic poems of Ossian, at the request of his uncle, general Napoleon Bonaparte, who greatly admired Ossian's works.

He was the eldest surviving son born to one of the Bonaparte siblings (Joseph, Napoleon, Lucien, Elisa, Louis, Pauline, Caroline and Jérôme, most of which would later receive ruling positions in their brother's client states). (Note: The eldest son born to one of the siblings was stillborn in 1796, to Lucien and his first wife, Christine Boyer (Montgomery-Massingberd 1977, p. 105).) Six weeks after his birth, on 29 May 1798, Dermide was baptised "with imperial ceremony" at a Capuchin church in Milan. Charles Louis Huguet, marquis de Sémonville stood as witness and Napoleon served as godfather. The baptism was welcomed by the Milanese people with gun salutes, ringing of church bells, music and shouting, just as had been done at the births of Austrian archdukes during the Austrian Rule. Following a quarrel with officials of the Cisalpine Republic, Leclerc took his wife and son to Paris, where they established themselves at No. 1, Rue de la Victoire. Napoleon resided on the same street, albeit at No. 6. Meanwhile, after a coup d'état in 1799, the French Consulate was established and Napoleon installed himself as First Consul.

In 1791, the Haitian Revolution had begun in Saint-Domingue (present-day Haiti), which had been a French colony since 1697. Wanting to restore French authority on the island, Napoleon organised the Saint-Domingue expedition, placing Leclerc in charge and bestowing upon him the title of Governor-General of Saint-Domingue. Consequently, on 14 December 1801, Leclerc embarked on the flagship L'Océan at Brest with his wife and son, and sailed for Saint-Domingue, which they eventually reached on 28 January 1802. While Leclerc quickly left the ship, Pauline and Dermide remained on board. Although Dermide was initially healthy and Leclerc had assured Napoleon that his son had "survived the crossing from France better than anyone", both mother and son suffered episodes of yellow fever while they were at Le Cap, nonetheless recovering quickly. Dermide was apportioned to a grenadier at Port-au-Prince and spent much of his time playing. On 2 November, Leclerc, who had been ill with yellow fever, died at Tortuga. Preparations for Pauline and Dermide's departure from Saint-Domingue were completed quickly, and they left the colony aboard HMS Swiftsure, arriving at Toulon on New Year's Day 1803.

=== Later life ===
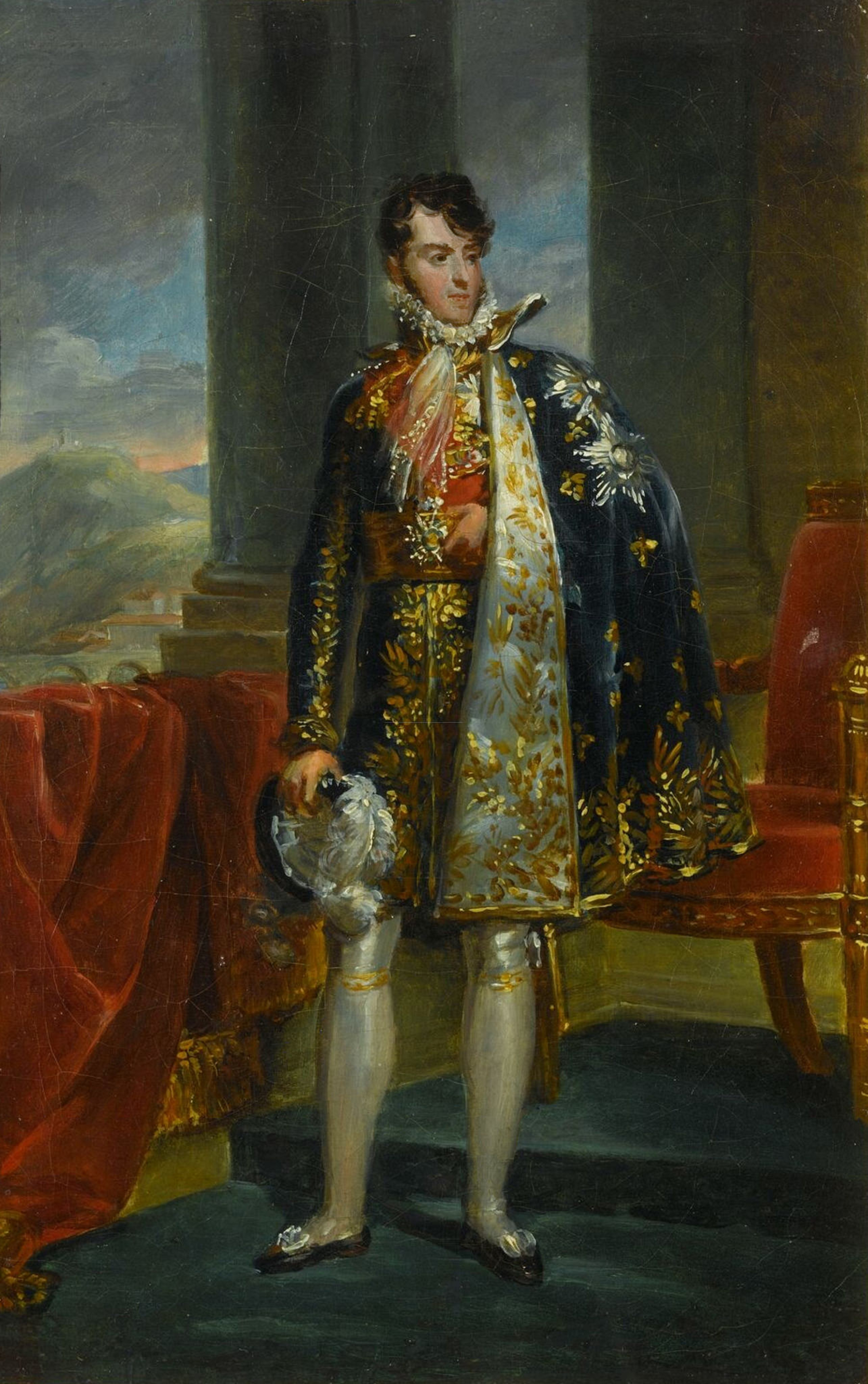
Camillo Borghese, Dermide's stepfather.

Pauline found a temporary place to live for her and Dermide at her brother Joseph's hotel in the Rue du Faubourg Saint-Honoré. Eventually, they settled in the Château de Montgobert, her husband's former estate, which was Dermide's inheritance from his father. Napoleon did not wish for Pauline to remain without a husband and, as such, Roman nobleman Camillo Borghese, 6th Prince of Sulmona was selected with the help of Pope Pius VII. Thus, on 14 November 1803, Pauline, Camillo and Dermide set out on a journey towards Rome. Dermide had his own carriage, drawn by six horses, which he shared with his governess, Madame Ducluzel, and with his mother's lectrice (reader), Jenny Saint-Maur. In one of the cities through which they passed, a gendarme asked the family who they were, upon which Dermide replied, "Messieurs, it is the son of General Leclerc traveling with his suite." Saint-Maur swiftly corrected him, albeit "admiring his spirit". The family took up residence at the Palazzo Borghese in Rome.

Pauline, being "family minded", welcomed her brother Lucien, who had been living in exile at the Villa Rufinella in Frascati, during his visits in Rome and valued his children, Charlotte (b. 1795), Christine (b. 1798) and Charles Lucien (b. 1803), as Dermide's playmates. Dermide captivated Lucien and his wife, Alexandrine de Bleschamp, and the couple observed that Borghese was not very affectionate towards Pauline's son. Lucien even considered Dermide as a possible future husband for his daughter Christine. In hopes of restoring her health, Pauline and Borghese agreed that they should travel to Florence in the summer of 1804, and from there to the thermal baths of Pisa, which were hoped to have better effect than the ones at Frascati. Pauline wanted to take Dermide with them, but Borghese advised against it, instead proposing to leave Dermide with his brother Francesco in Frascati, near Lucien's Villa Rufinella. Thus, Dermide, Madame Ducluzel and his tutor, Monsieur de la Ronde, were moved to Francesco's Villa Mondragone.

=== Death ===
By August, Lucien, his children and Dermide had all suffered from bouts of fever. Doctors saw no cause for alarm and Lucien quickly recovered, as did his children. Despite the doctors' best efforts, Dermide died on 14 August, at the age of six. Pauline later came to believe her son's blood had been thinned by the recurrent spells of yellow fever they had suffered in Saint-Domingue. Borghese decided to conceal Dermide's death from his wife until her health improved. Thus, Francesco returned to Frascati and wrote three letters addressed to Pauline: one which announced the onset of Dermide's illness, the second announcing that the illness worsened and the third announcing Dermide's demise. Immediately after receiving the first letter, Pauline began making preparations for her departure from Pisa, in order to reach her son at Frascati. Before this was possible, she became aware of the truth and her suspicions were confirmed by de la Ronde.

Pauline was grief-stricken and later said "My poor little boy. If only I had been with him...I would have nursed him as I nursed his father". She came to blame Borghese for his decision to send Dermide to Frascati and called him "the butcher of my son", believing that, had it not been for her husband, her son "would still be alive". Leclerc's parents accused Pauline of having neglected Dermide, leaving him to die under the care of servants, when she could have left him in France, to live with them. Nonetheless, Pauline had her son buried at the Château de Montgobert, next to General Leclerc. Dermide's inheritance reverted to his father's family and, in spite of her wishes to be buried beside her son and first husband at Montgobert, Pauline was buried at the Saint Mary Major Basilica in Rome upon her death in 1825.
