= Charles Leclerc (general, born 1772) =

French Army officer (1772–1802)

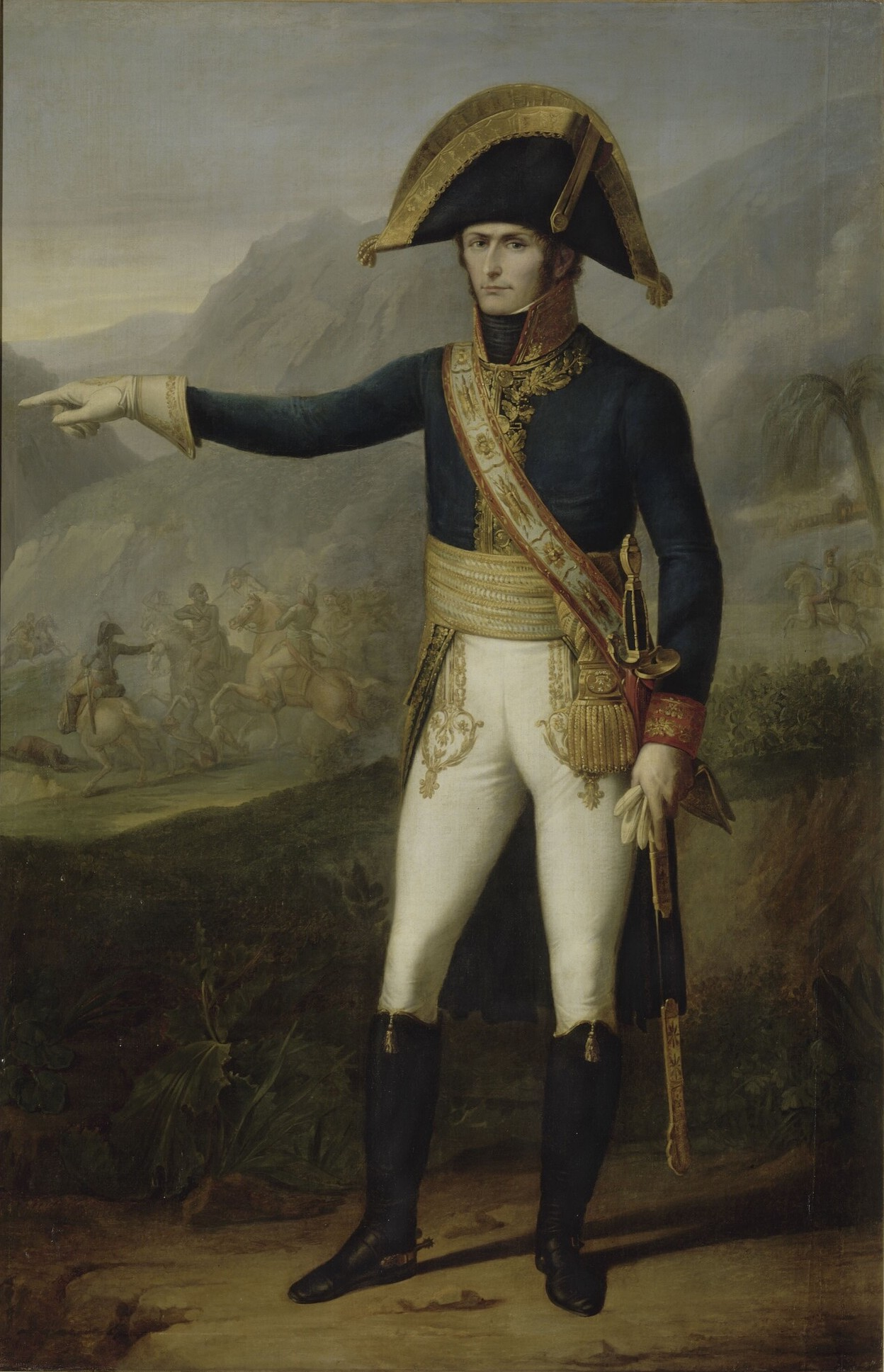
- Portrait by François Kinson, 1804
- Born: 17 March 1772; Pontoise, Île-de-France
- Died: 2 November 1802 (aged 30); Tortuga, Saint-Domingue
- Spouse: Pauline Bonaparte (m. 1797)
- Children: Dermide Leclerc
- Military career
- Allegiance: Kingdom of France; French First Republic
- Branch: French Royal Army; French Revolutionary Army
- Service years: 1791–1802
- Rank: Divisional general
- Conflicts: French Revolutionary Wars; War of the First Coalition; Siege of Toulon; Italian campaigns of the French Revolutionary Wars; Battle of Castiglione; Battle of Rivoli; Haitian Revolution; Saint-Domingue expedition #

Divisional-General Charles Victoire Emmanuel Leclerc (French pronunciation: [ʃaʁl viktwaʁ emanɥɛl ləklɛʁ]; 17 March 1772 – 2 November 1802) was a French Army officer who served in the French Revolutionary Wars. He was the husband of Pauline Bonaparte, the younger sister of Napoleon. In 1801, Leclerc was appointed commander of the Saint-Domingue expedition with the goal of restoring French rule and slavery in the colony of Saint-Domingue and deposing Governor-General Toussaint Louverture. The expedition defeated Louverture's army and deported him to France, but Leclerc died of yellow fever after the colony's Black population revolted against French rule.

== Early life ==
Charles Leclerc was born on 17 March 1772 in Pontoise, Île-de-France. In 1791, he volunteered to join the French Royal Army, serving as a second lieutenant in the 12th Regiment of Chasseurs à Cheval before becoming an aide-de-camp to Jean François Cornu de La Poype. Leclerc remained loyal to the French First Republic which replaced the Kingdom of France and was promoted to the rank of captain, serving as the chief of staff of a French Revolutionary Army division during the siege of Toulon in 1793, where he met Napoleon for the first time.

Following the capture of Toulon, he served in the Army of the Rhine and fought in the Italian campaigns of the French Revolutionary Wars, participating in the battles of Castiglione and Rivoli and rising to the rank of brigade general by 1797. Leclerc was subsequently ordered to bring news of the Peace of Leoben to the French Directory in Paris. Napoleon's sister Pauline Bonaparte, who had a large number of suitors, was pressing him to have her married off to a man of his choosing. Upon Leclerc's return to Paris, he accepted Napoleon's offer to marry Pauline. The couple would go on to have one child, Dermide Leclerc, and resided in the Château de Montgobert.

Leclerc was later appointed as chief of staff under Louis-Alexandre Berthier and Guillaume Brune, participating in the second French expedition to Ireland led by Jean Joseph Amable Humbert in 1798. After Napoleon returned from the French invasion of Egypt and Syria, he promoted Leclerc to the rank of divisional general and sent him back to the Army of the Rhine, then under Jean Victor Marie Moreau's command. He subsequently participated in the Coup of 18 Brumaire on 9 November 1799 which made Napoleon the First Consul of France. During the coup, supported by Joachim Murat, Leclerc ordered a detachment of grenadiers to march into the Council of Five Hundred.

He later fought in the War of the Second Coalition, including at the battle of Hohenlinden, receiving the supreme command of the 17th, 18th, and 19th divisions of the French army. Leclerc was then appointed as commander-in-chief of a French army corps that Napoleon planned to send to Portugal to force the Portuguese government to renounce the Anglo-Portuguese Alliance, though that expedition never took place.

== Saint-Domingue ==
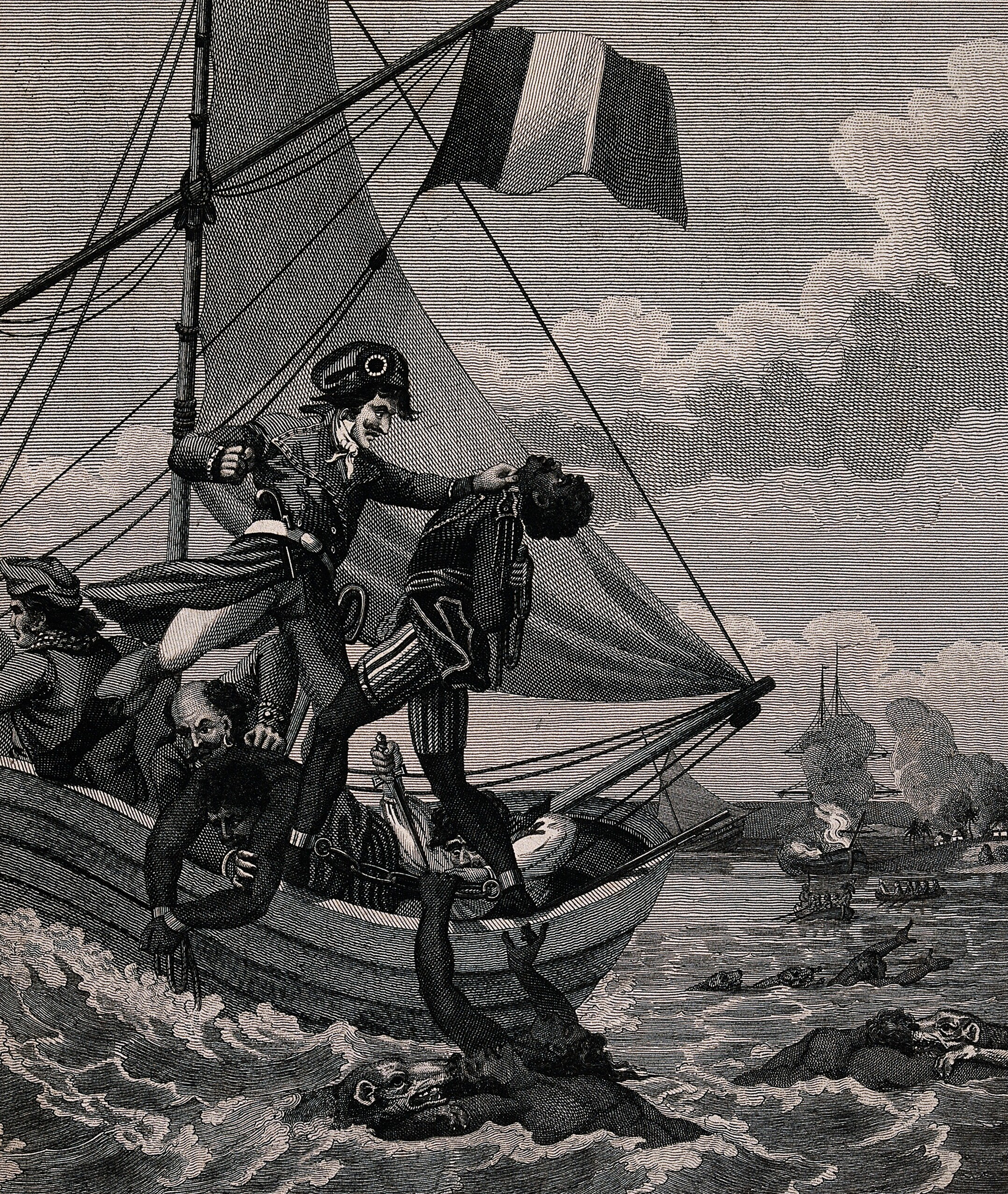
French sailors drowning Black prisoners under Leclerc's orders

On 24 October 1801 Napoleon appointed Leclerc as the commander of a military expedition to overthrow the regime of Toussaint Louverture in the French colony of Saint-Domingue and restore metropolitan authority there. In his initial instructions, Napoleon directed Leclerc to liquidate Louverture's government and deport his military officers to France, while publicly maintaining the abolition of slavery in Saint-Domingue. Napoleon announced his intentions to reinstate slavery in the neighbouring Captaincy General of Santo Domingo, which Louverture's forces had recently occupied. Secretly, Napoleon planned to reinstate slavery in Saint-Domingue once Louverture had been detained by French troops.

Leclerc left Brest, France on 14 December 1801 at the head of a French Navy fleet transporting 40,000 troops, publicly repeating Bonaparte's promise that "all of the people of Saint-Domingue are French" and would remain forever free. Louverture's harsh discipline had made him numerous enemies, and Leclerc played off the ambitions of Louverture's officers and competitors against each other, promising them that they would maintain their ranks in the French army and convincing them to abandon Louverture. The French won several victories against Louverture's army and regained control of Saint-Domingue in three months after fierce fighting, with Louverture forced to negotiate a surrender with Leclerc which resulted in him being placed under house arrest in his plantations. However, Napoleon had given secret instructions to Leclerc to arrest Louverture, which he did during a meeting before deporting him to France, where Louverture died in 1803 while imprisoned at Fort de Joux in the Jura Mountains.

Despite his superiors' warnings, Leclerc did not consolidate his victory by disarming Louverture's officers and troops. After a brief period in which he incorporated many of Louverture's officers into his own army, Black troops serving under the French began to desert during the second half of 1802. These desertions, along with uprisings by Black labourers, occurred in response to news that slavery had been reestablished in the nearby French colony of Guadeloupe. The prospect of a similar restoration of slavery in Saint-Domingue swung the tide inexorably against French hopes of reimposing control, as Leclerc began summarily executing Black troops and prisoners en masse.

By October 1802, Leclerc wrote a letter to Napoleon advocating for a war of annihilation, declaring that "We must destroy all the blacks of the mountains – men and women – and spare only children under 12 years of age. We must destroy half of those in the plains and must not leave a single colored person in the colony who has worn an epaulette." He also lamented his assignment in the letter, declaring "My soul is withered, and no joyful thought can ever make forget these hideous scenes." In the meantime, more Black officers defected from Leclerc's army, including Jean-Jacques Dessalines, Alexandre Pétion and Henri Christophe. After Christophe massacred several hundred Polish soldiers at Port-de-Paix following his defection, Leclerc ordered the arrest of all remaining Black troops in French service in Cap-Francais, executing 1,000 of them by tying sacks of flour to their necks and pushing them off the side of ships.

== Death and legacy ==
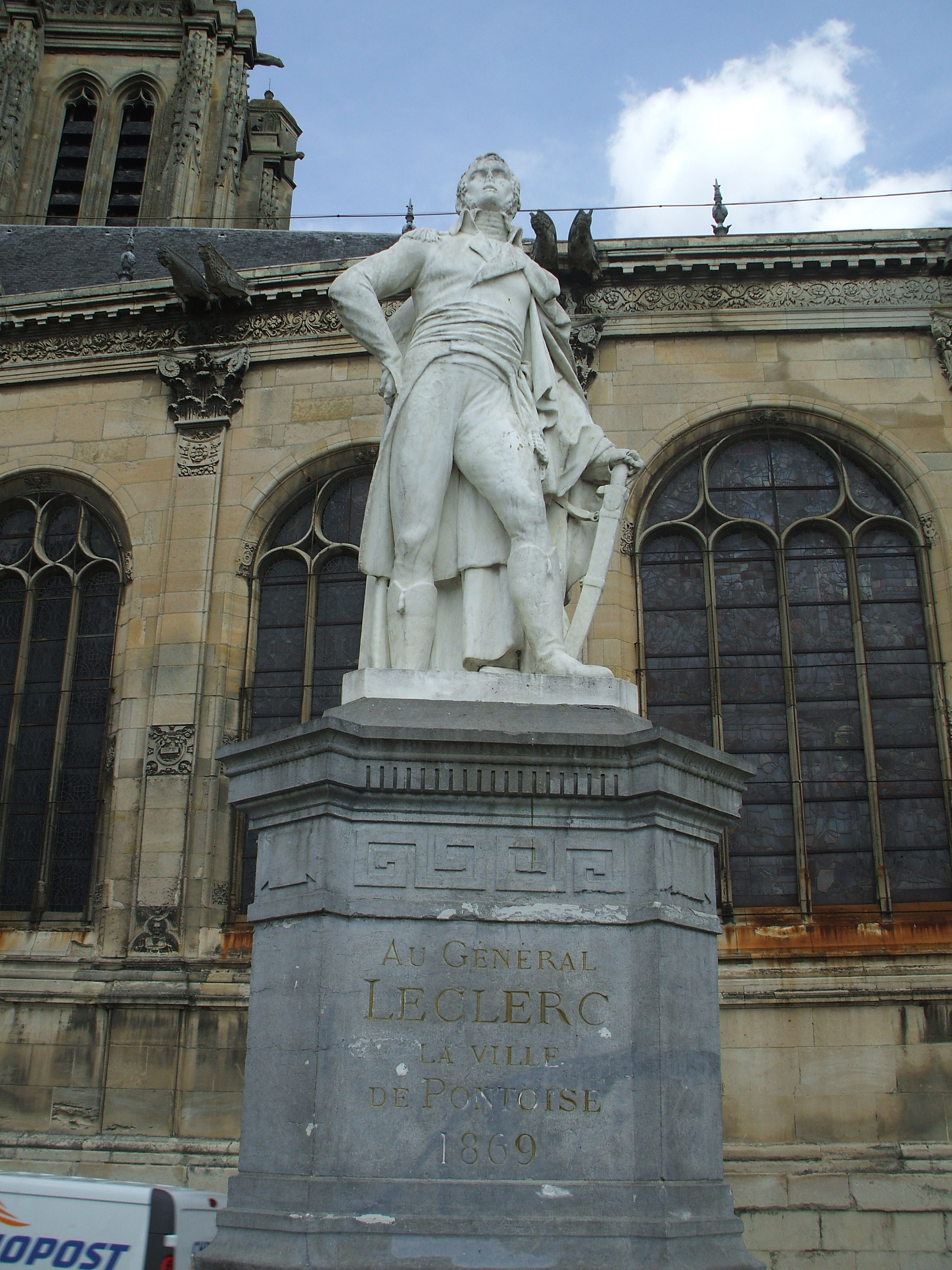
Statue of Leclerc in Pontoise

In November 1802, Leclerc died of yellow fever, which had already decimated his army. Pauline returned to Europe, where she later married the Italian nobleman Camillo Borghese, 6th Prince of Sulmona. Leclerc was succeeded in his command by Donatien de Rochambeau, whose similarly brutal tactics drove more Haitians to resist the French. On 18 November 1803, François Capois defeated Rochambeau's army in the Battle of Vertières. Dessalines proclaimed the independence of Saint-Domingue as Haiti on 1 January 1804. In the meantime, Leclerc's body had been transported to France by Pauline and buried on one of his estates.

A statue at Pontoise depicts Leclerc in his French army uniform, his scabbard touching the earth. It was placed by Louis Nicolas Davout and his second wife Louise-Aimée-Julie at the top of a staircase built in 1869 by François Lemot. Around three metres high, the statue is on a square stone pedestal inscribed with information on him in gold majuscule letters. It adjoins the south side of the Pontoise Cathedral. There is also a statue of him by Jean Guillaume Moitte in the Pantheon de Paris, and another statue of Leclerc fully nude at the Palace of Versailles which was sculpted by Charles Dupaty.

== Bibliography ==
- Dubois, Laurent (2009). Avengers of the New World: The Story of the Haitian Revolution. Harvard University Press. ISBN 9780674034365.
