= Horești =

Horești may refer to several places in Moldova:

- Horești, a commune in Fălești District
- Horești, a commune in Ialoveni District

== See also ==
- Hora (disambiguation)
- Horea (disambiguation)
