= Dhund =

Dhund may refer to:

- Dhund (tribe) (also Dhond) a tribe of northern Pakistan
- Dhund (1973 film), Indian Hindi-language thriller film by B. R. Chopra, starring Sanjay Khan, Zeenat Aman and Danny Denzongpa
- Dhund (2003 film), Indian Hindi-language thriller film by Shyam Ramsay, starring Amar Upadhyay, Apurva Agnihotri, Aditi Govitrikar and Irrfan Khan
- Dhund (TV series), a Pakistani television series

== See also ==
- Kohra (disambiguation)
