= Chora =

Chora may refer to:

== Places ==
=== Greece ===
- Chora, old capital of the island of Alonnisos
- Chora, village on the island of Folegandros
- Chora, Ios, capital of the island of Ios
- Chora, Messenia, a small town in Messenia in the Peloponnese
- Chora, principal town on the island of Mykonos
- Chora, an alternative name for Naxos city on the island of Naxos
- Chora, principal town on the island of Patmos
- Chora Sfakion, a town on the south coast of Crete
- Chora, the main town of the island of Kythira

=== Other ===
- Chora (woreda), a district in the Oromia Region of Ethiopia
- Chora, Iran, village in Gilan Province
- Chora District, in the Uruzgan province of Afghanistan
- Chora, Afghanistan, the capital of the Chora District above.
- Diocese of Chora, of the Greek Orthodox Archdiocese of Australia

== See also ==
- Chora Church, a Byzantine church in Istanbul
- Chora (software), a web-based CVS repository viewer
- Miura Chora (1729–1780), Japanese poet
- Khôra, Greek term used by Plato to describe neither being nor nonbeing
- Kura (administrative division), medieval administrative unit derived from the term 'chora'
- Hora (disambiguation)
- Khora (disambiguation)
