= Château de la Mignarde =

Coordinates: 43.5663°N 5.4758°E

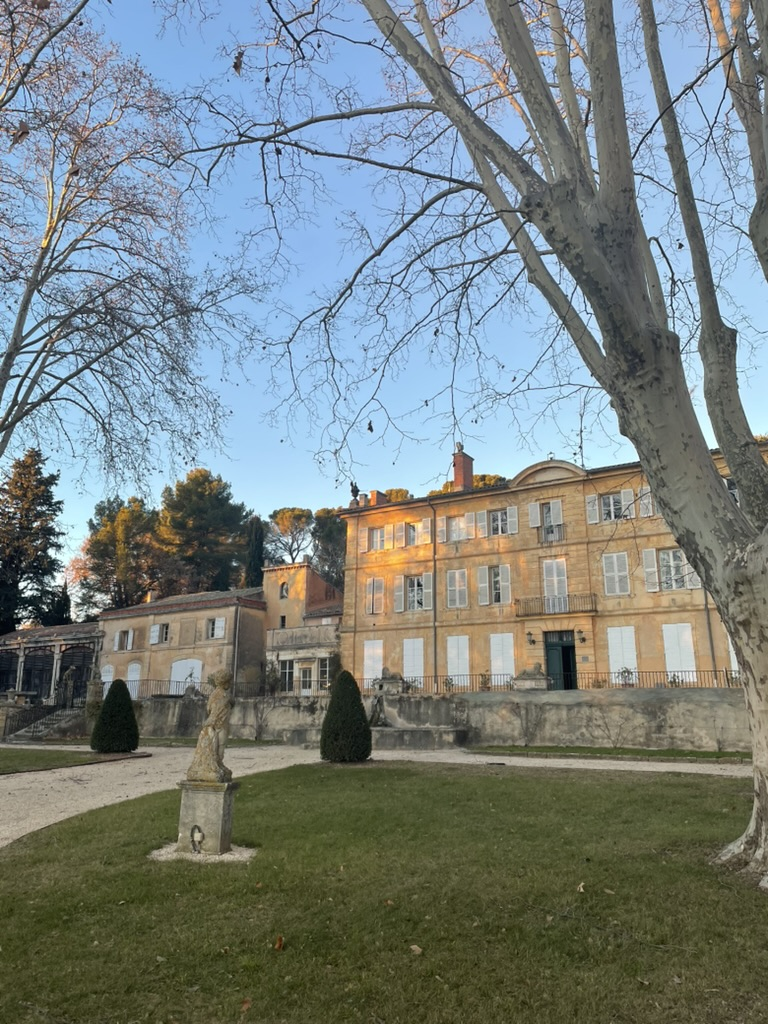
- Interactive map of the Château de la Mignarde area

General information
- Type: Château
- Location: Route des Pinchinats, Aix-en-Provence, France
- Completed: 18th century
- Owner: Sabine Sechiari

The Château de la Mignarde is a listed château in Aix-en-Provence.

== Location ==
It is located on the Route des Pinchinats on the Northern outskirts of Aix-en-Provence.

== History ==
It was built in the eighteenth century. The facade has twenty-seven windows. The drawing-room sports a wallpaper which was hand-painted, representing fields of rice in China. Throughout the garden, there are ponds and sculptures.

Jean-Joseph-Pierre Pascalis (1732-1790), a supporter of the monarchy, was hiding in this chateau when he was arrested in and killed during the French Revolution. A few decades later, in 1807, Pauline Bonaparte (1780–1825), sister of Napoleon (1761-1821), had an affair with Louis Nicolas Philippe Auguste de Forbin (1779-1841) in this chateau. During her stay, she asked her staff to silence the frogs and cicadas with long poles.

It later belonged to the inventor of mignardises, a small petit four. His son, Sauveur Mignard, remodelled it. In 1858, it was purchased by Émile Rigaud (1824-1890), who served as the mayor of Aix-en-Provence from 1849 to 1863.

It still belongs to one of Émile Rigaud's descendants, Sabine Sechiari, who founded the non-profit organization Association des bastides et des jardins de Provence et du Sud-Est (English: "Association of bastides and gardens of Provence"). It has received funding for its restoration from Vieilles Maisons Françaises, a non-profit organization for the restoration of old buildings in France.

== Transmission and inheritance by the Sechiari family ==
The estate remained in the descent of Émile Rigaud thanks to a significant alliance at the turn of the 20th century. The château was indeed transmitted through the marriage, celebrated in 1900, between Julie Rigaud (1874-1967), a descendant of the former mayor of Aix-en-Provence, and Étienne Sechiari (born in 1871). It is through this union that the building entered the fold of the Sechiari family.

== History and nobility of the Sechiari family ==
The Sechiari family, who today looks after the Château de la Mignarde, is an illustrious family of Greek origin from the island of Chios. Heavily involved in major international maritime trade and finance in the 19th and 20th centuries, they established themselves as one of the great merchant dynasties of the Chiot diaspora, building a powerful commercial network extending notably between Marseille and London.

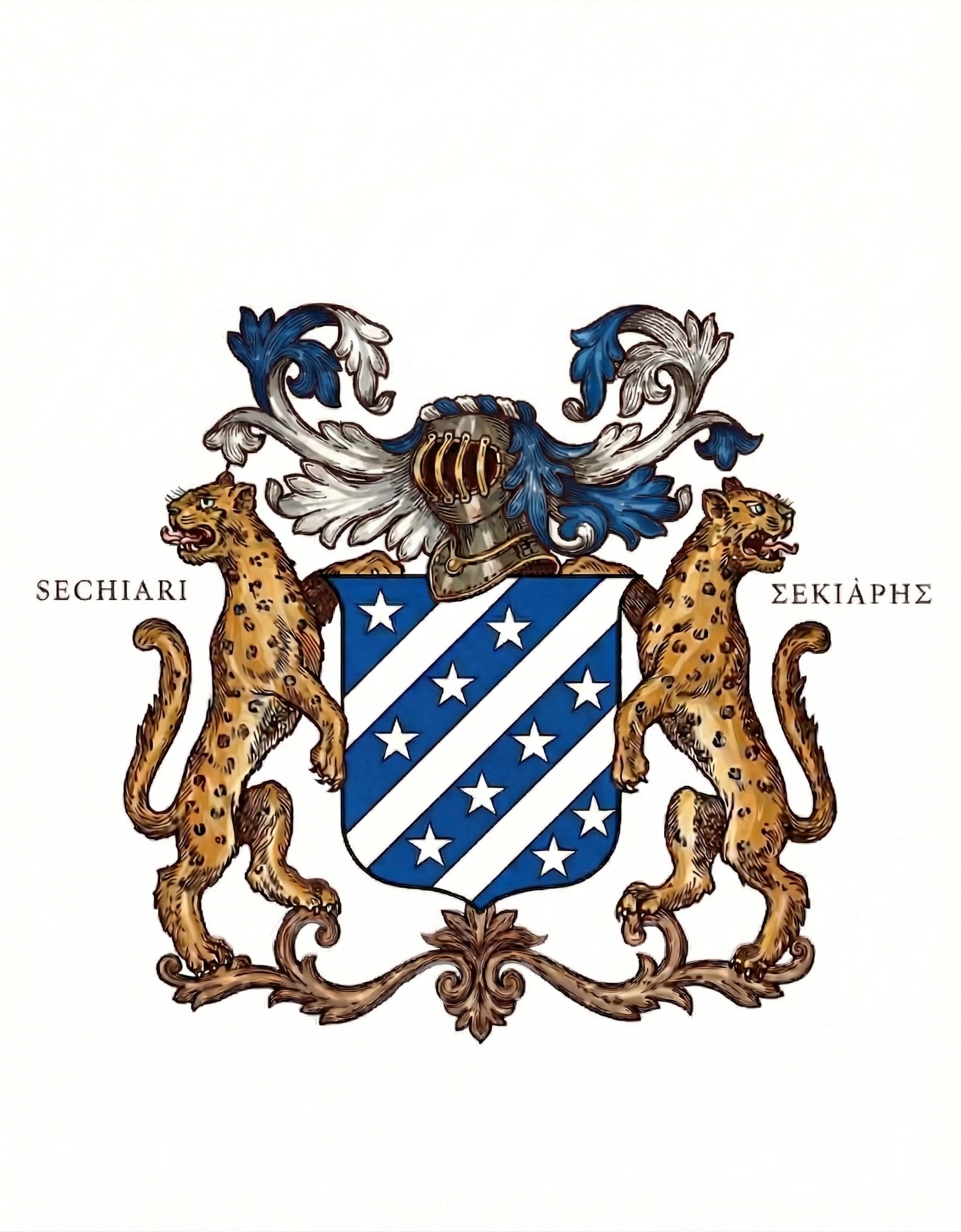
D'azur à trois barres d'argent accompagnées de dix étoiles à cinq rais du même, posées 1, 3, 4, 2.Supports : deux léopards contournés, au naturel.Casque : de profil à quatre grilles.Lambrequins : d'argent et d'azur.

In terms of genealogy and nobility, the Sechiari enjoy a prestigious status. They historically belong to the "Twenty" (Εικοσάδα in modern Greek), an institution designating the twenty most noble families of Chios, as established in the Libro d'Oro (Golden Book) of the island's nobility. This work specifies, moreover, that the members of this dynasty "were always considered in Chios as a noble and very ancient family".

In addition, the Sechiari are part of the aristocracy of the "archons", the notables who governed and administered the island under Ottoman occupation. The family is also classified among the lineages of Phanariots, these wealthy Orthodox Christian families, heirs to the Byzantine aristocracy, who gravitated around the Ecumenical Patriarchate of Constantinople. The alliance of the Sechiari with the Rigauds thus illustrates the remarkable intersection, at the Château de la Mignarde, between the history of the local Provençal bourgeoisie and that of the great Hellenic aristocracy.

== Heritage significance ==
It has been listed as a monument historique since 1995.
