= Kohra =

Kohra may refer to:

- Kohra (estate), Taluqdari Estate in Oudh
- Kohra, Amethi, a village in Uttar Pradesh, India
- Kohra (1964 film), Indian film
- Kohra (1993 film), Indian film

== See also ==
- Kohrra, Indian crime thriller TV series
- Kohraam, 1991 Indian film
- Korha (disambiguation)
- Khora (disambiguation)
- Dhund (disambiguation)
