= Hora =

Hora may refer to:

== Companies ==
- Hora (company), a Romanian manufacturer of stringed musical instruments

== People, real & mythological ==
- Hora (pl. Horae), figure from Greek mythology
- Hora (surname)
- Hora, a member of the Japanese duo Schwarz Stein
- Hora, one of the indigenous peoples in Bolivia

== Places ==
- Hureh, Chaharmahal and Bakhtiari in Iran

== Dance and music ==
- Hora (dance), a circle dance originating in the Balkans
- "Hora", an entry by Israel in the Eurovision Song Contest 1982

== Other ==
- Horae, the Latin term for a book of hours
- Hora (astrology), a branch of the Indian system Jyotiṣa
- Hora, any of several Western Classical goddesses, collectively Horae
- Dipterocarpus zeylanicus, a tree species commonly known by its anglicized Sinhalese name "hora"
- Hora (2009 film), a 2009 Norwegian exploitation film

== See also ==
- Horea (disambiguation)
- Horești (disambiguation)
- Horon (disambiguation)
  - Horon (dance)
- Ora (disambiguation)
- Khora (disambiguation)
- Khôra, philosophical term
