= Kora, Kendrapara =

Coordinates: 20.5742351°N 86.4765592°E

Kora is a village in the Kendrapara tehsil, Kendrapara district, Odisha state, India. It is located off the north side of the Cuttack-Kendrapara Road, about 75 km from Cuttack, 16 km beyond Kendrapara, and 16 km from Pattamundai. According to the 2011 census, it had 530 households and 2,410 inhabitants (251 in the 0-6 age range) and 84.6% literacy rate.
