= Horia (name) =

Horia is a Romanian-language male name that may refer to:

- Horia Agarici
- Horia Bernea
- Horia Bonciu
- Horia Brenciu
- Horia Creangă
- Horia Colibășanu
- Horia Damian
- Horia Demian
- Horia Furtună
- Horia Gârbea
- Horia Hulubei
- Horia Macellariu
- Horia Moculescu
- Horia-Roman Patapievici
- Horia Sima
- Horia Tecău
