= Toyaguda, Adilabad =

Coordinates: 19.6453°N 78.6982°E

Toyaguda, formerly known as Kora, is a small village located in Adilabad district, Telangana state, India. It is located about 330 km north of Hyderabad, 24 km east of Adilabad, and 15 km southwest of Bela, and 1 km west of the Sathnala Dam Reservoir.

According to the 2011 census, the town had 268 households and 1296 inhabitants (including 113 children 0–6), with an adult literacy rate of 66%.
