= Kora, Wardha =

Village in Maharashtra

Coordinates: 20.508°N 79.105°E

Kora
- Village
- Interactive map of Kora
- Country: India
- State: Maharashtra

Kora is a village in the Sumudrapur tehsil, Wardha district, Maharastra state, India.

The village is located about 90 km from Nagpur, 67km from Wardha, 30km from Hinganghat, and 30km from Chimur, near the south corner of the Lal Nalla Reservoir, at a mean altitude of 228 meters. According to the 2011 census, it has 3,127 residents (including 346 children aged 0–6)s. The literacy rate is 82.5%. Its PIN code is 442301. It belongs to the Hinganghat assembly constituency and the Wardha parliamentary constituency.

Kora village is a gram panchayat and is administered by a sarpanch (head of village) who is elected every five years. The town has a primary and secondary school, a Hindu temple dedicated to Hanuman, and a mosque.
