= Korra, Pashchimi Singhbhum =

Village in Jharkhand, India

Coordinates: 22.861°N 85.549°E

Korra is a village in the Kuchai tehsil, Pashchimi Singhbhum district, Jharkhand state, India.
