= Korha =

Korha may refer to:

- Kora, Katihar, a town and tehsil in the India state of Bihar, also spelled Korha
- Korha, Bagalpur
- Korha (Vidhan Sabha constituency), a political constituency in Katihar, Bihar, India

== See also ==
- Kora (disambiguation)
- Kohra (disambiguation)
