= Kora, Bharuch =

Village at the mouth of Mahi River, India

Coordinates: 22.114°N 72.690°E

Kora is a village in the Jambusar tehsil, Bharuch district, Gujarat state, India. It is located just east of the mouth of the Mahi River, about 16 km northwest of Jambusar, 70 km southwest of Vadodara, and 65 km northwest of Bharuch, at an altitude of about 13 m. Its PIN is 392155.

According to the 2011 census, Kora had 299 households with 1376 inhabitants (149 in the 0-6 age range), and a literacy level of 72.5%. It has two Hndu temples, dedicated to Hanuman and Shiva.
