= Kora (Fintech company) =

African payment service provider

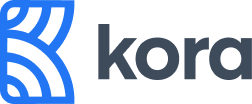
- Formerly: Korapay
- Type: Fintech
- Founded: 2018
- Founder: Dickson Nsofor
- Headquarters: Lagos, Nigeria
- Area served: Africa; Nigeria; Ghana; Kenya; Cameroun; South Africa; Côte d'Ivoire
- Key people: Ayodeji Osisanmi (CFO)
- Products: Pay-ins; Payouts; Settlement; Card Issuing; KYC Verification
- Number of employees: 210
- Website: korahq.com

Kora (formerly Korapay) is a global fiat and stablecoin payment infrastructure company connecting Africa to the world's digital economy. Founded in 2018 and headquartered in Dubai, UAE, Kora gives businesses a single API and one unified rail to collect payments, disburse funds, and convert currencies across borders, without the friction of managing multiple local systems.

By integrating local bank rails, mobile money wallets, card networks, and stablecoin rails into one platform, Kora eliminates fragmentation in Africa’s financial landscape and powers high-growth companies across markets like Nigeria, Kenya, Ghana, South Africa, Egypt, and beyond.

== History ==
Dickson Nsofor founded Kora in 2018. Later on, Gideon Orovwiroro, Bryan Uyanwune and Ayodeji Osisami joined him as early team members.

At the time, the company focused on building financial tools for NGOs to disburse funds utilizing blockchain technology. The idea for the company came from Dickson Nsofor, who was at the time working for a fintech in London, HumanIQ, providing a solution to the problem of 60% of the world's population lacking full access to financial services.

== Growth ==
Korapay started as a blockchain network in 2018, and later pivot to a remittance business. In 2019, the company attended Techstars Toronto accelerator programme. The decision was made to shut down the remittance business as Korapay couldn't compete with the existing players.

Later in 2022, the founder made a pivot to its operations while changing the name to Kora; a B2B company that offers payment gateway services.

In 2022, the company received a commercial PSSP license from the Central Bank of Nigeria.

=== Expansion to the UK ===
Later in the 2022, Kora expanded to the United Kingdom by partnering with the municipal government in Birmingham to open its first fully operational UK office. At the 2022 Commonwealth Games opening ceremony, Kora was announced as a new Commonwealth-sourced foreign direct investments (FDI) project for the West Midlands.

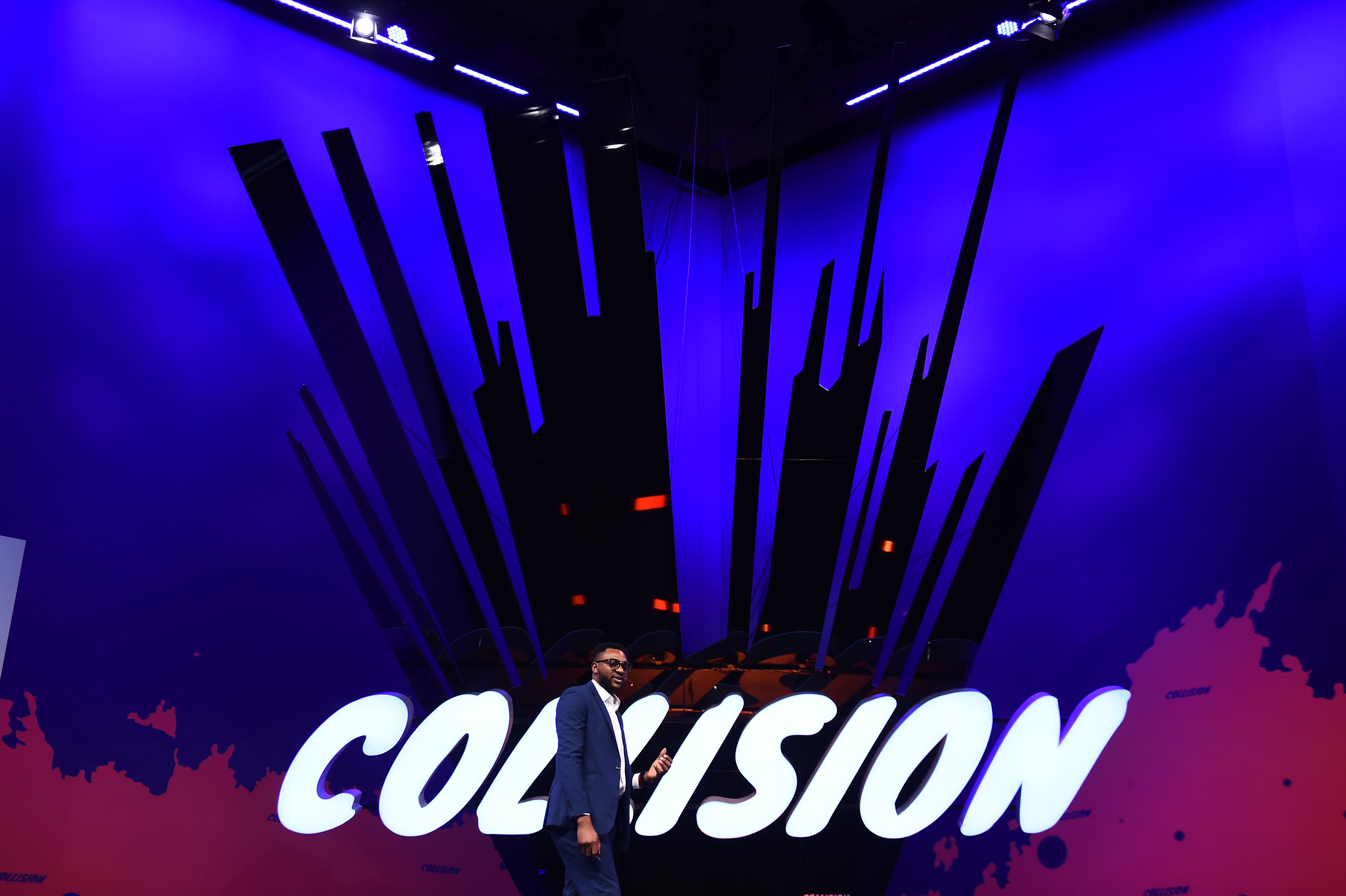
Dickson Nsofor, CEO of Kora, on centre stage ahead of the opening night of Collision 2019 at Enercare Center in Toronto, Canada.

In July of 2022, the company was accused of money laundering and card fraud in Kenya, but the charges were dropped a few months later after investigations revealed no wrongdoing on the part of the company. Both Kenya Asset Recovery Agency and the Kenyan Department for Criminal Investigation found no evidence of fraud in the company's operations. In one court document drawn and filed on the 19th of October 2022 by state counsel Stephen Githinji on behalf of the ARA director, the agency said that it had withdrawn its entire lawsuit.

== Products and services ==
Kora offers a payment application programming interface (API) to companies that give them access to a suite of products and services including Pay-ins, Payout, Payment Links, Virtual Bank Account, Dynamic Virtual Bank Account, Fixed Bank Account, mobile money payments acquiring, card issuing, bulk payout, KYC verification etc.
