= Khora (disambiguation) =

Khora is a city in Uttar Pradesh, India.

Khora may also refer to:

- Khôra, a concept in philosophy
- Khora, or Chora, the name of several places in Greece
- Khora people, an ethnic group of the Andaman Islands
  - Khora language, their language
- Khora (dance), a Ukrainian folk dance
- Khora or Kora (sword), Nepalese blade

== See also ==
- Khorra, a village in Haryana
- Khura
- Kohra
- Khôra
- Hora (disambiguation)
