= Korra, Muzaffarpur =

Village in Bihar, India

Korra is a village in the Baruraj Motipur tehsil, Muzaffarpur district, Bihar state, India.
