= Horon (disambiguation) =

Horon is a group of traditional folk dances from the Pontian region of Turkey.

Horon may also refer to:

- Hauron, conventionally referred to as Horon, Canaanite and Ugaritic deity
- Akçiğdem, formerly Horon, village in Turkey

== See also ==
- Beth-Horon (Upper and Lower), towns in ancient Israel, named after the Canaanite deity
- Beit Horon, Israeli West Bank settlement named after the ancient towns
