= Horațiu Pașca =

Romanian handball coach

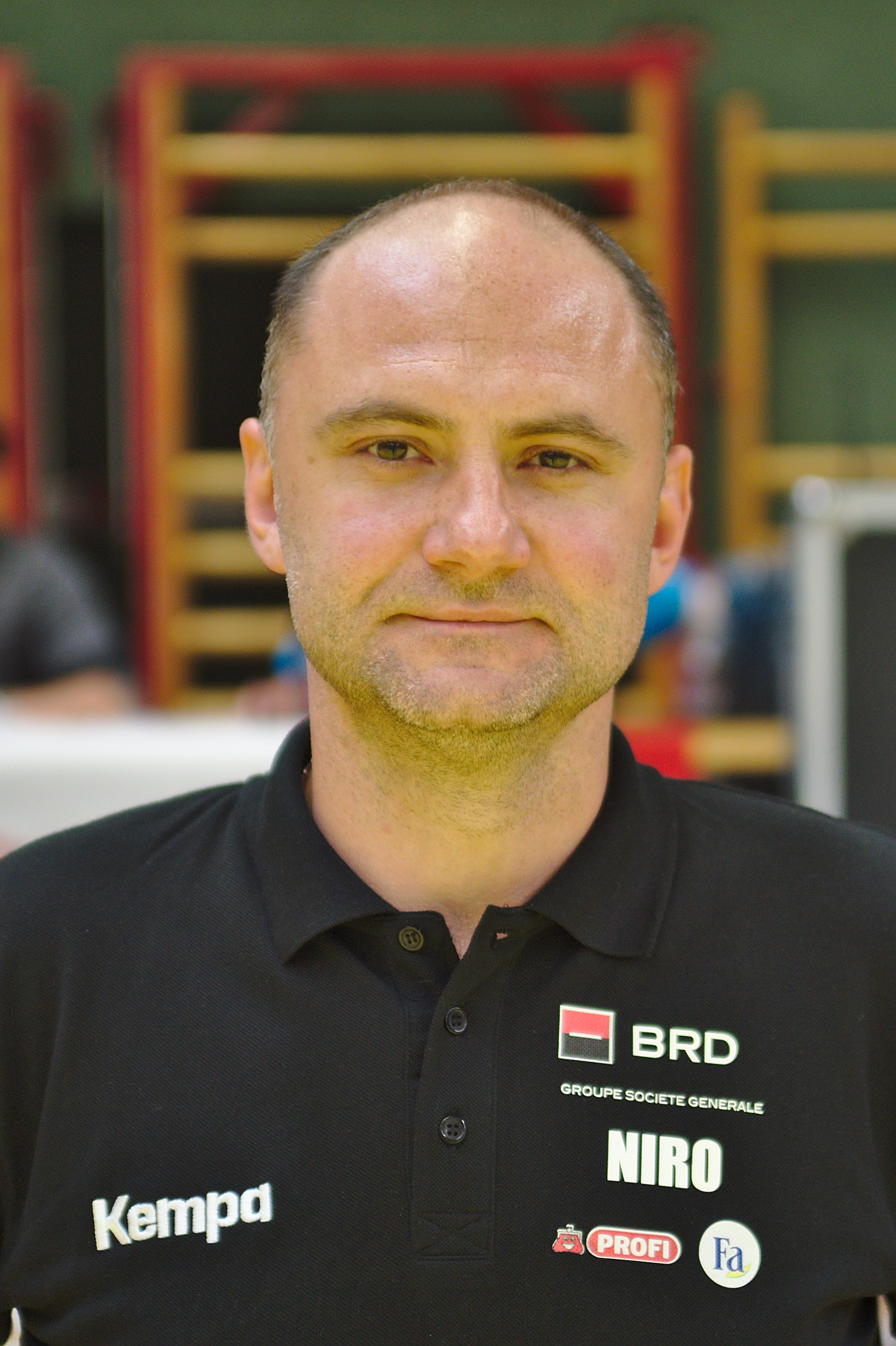

Personal information
- Full name: Horațiu Pașca
- Nationality: Romanian
- Born: 5 June 1980 (age 46) Bistrița, Romania

Sport
- Sport: Handball
- Current club: Gloria Bistrița (manager)

Senior clubs
- Years: Team
- –: HCM CSM Bistrița
- –: Universitatea Cluj-Napoca

Teams managed
- 2013–2014: Universitatea Jolidon Cluj-Napoca
- 2014–2023: Gloria Bistrița
- 2017–2019: Romania (assistant)

Horațiu Pașca (born 6 May 1981) is a Romanian former handball player and current coach.

== Achievements ==
=== Manager ===
Gloria Bistrița

- Liga Națională:
  - Bronze Medalist: 2019

U Jolidon Cluj

- Supercupa României:
  - Finalist: 2013
