= Kora, Bardhaman =

Village in West Bengal, India

Coordinates: 22.9703°N 87.9685°E

Kora is a village in the Jamalpur tehsil, Bardhaman district, West Bengal state, India. It is located on the Kushinguj-Amarpur road, about 75 km northwest of Kolkata (Calcutta), 50 km south of Bardhaman, and 13 km south of Jamalpur, Bardhaman, on the northwest shore of the Damodar River. Its PIN is 712410.

According to the 2011 census, Kora (census code 320681) had 218 households and 803 inhabitants (including 80 children aged 0–6), ad a literacy rate of 77%.
