= Korra, Patna =

Korra is a village in the Phulwari tehsil, Patna district, Bihar state, India.
