= Émile Rigaud =

French lawyer and politician

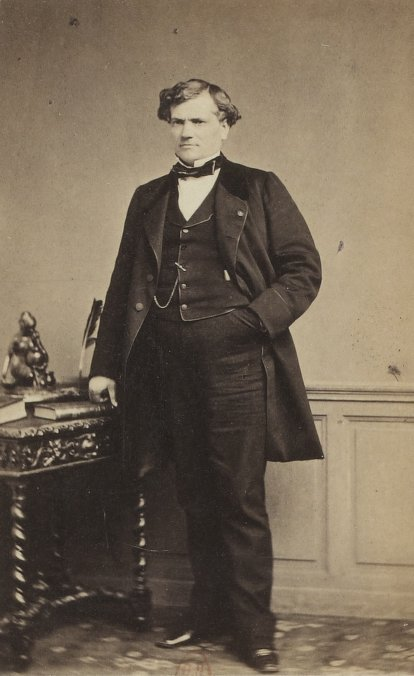
- Born: 27 March 1824; Pourrières, France
- Died: 19 March 1890 (aged 65); Aix-en-Provence, France
- Occupations: Lawyer; Politician
- Spouse: Rose Ernestine de Roccas
- Parent: Jean-Joseph Rigaud

Émile Rigaud (27 March 1824 – 19 March 1890) was a French lawyer and politician. He served as the Mayor of Aix-en-Provence from 1849 to 1863 and as a member of the National Assembly from 1852 to 1862.

== Biography ==
=== Early life ===
(Joseph) Émile Rigaud was born on 27 March 1824 in Pourrières. His father, Jean-Joseph Rigaud, was a notary. He had a brother, Constantin Michel Rigaud, and two sisters, Marie Léontine Rigaud and Marie Claire Rigaud.

=== Career ===
He started his career as a lawyer. He served as President of the Court of Appeals of Aix in 1862.

He attended a salon in Aix started by Polish-born Constantin Gaszinski, the editor of Le Mémorial d'Aix, a bi-weekly newspaper. He decided to embark upon a career in politics and joined the Parti de l'Ordre, an Orleanist and Legitimist conservative political party. He served as the mayor of Aix-en-Provence from 1849 to 1863. During his tenure, he oversaw the construction of the Gare d'Aix-en-Provence in 1856 and the Fontaine de la Rotonde in 1860. He then served as a member of the National Assembly from 1852 to 1862.

=== Personal life ===
He resided in a hôtel particulier located at number 16 on the Cours Mirabeau in Aix. In 1858, he also purchased the Château de la Mignarde in Aix-en-Provence from Sauveur Mignard, where he resided until his death. In August 1863, he married Rose Ernestine de Roccas. They had a son:

- Paul Rigaud. He ran for Mayor in Trets but lost.

He died on 19 March 1890 in Aix-en-Provence. His descendants still live in the Château de la Mignarde.

Political offices
Preceded by Félicien Agard	Mayor of Aix-en-Provence; 1849-1863	Succeeded by Pascal Paul Roux
