= Korra, Jehanabad =

Korra is a town in the Jehanabad district, Bihar state, India. Its PIN is 804406.
