= Korra, Alluri Sitharama Raju district =

Village in Andhra Pradesh, India

Korra is a village in the Dumbriguda mandal, Alluri Sitharama Raju district, Andhra Pradesh state, India. Its PIN is 531151.
