= Kora (sword) =

Sword in Nepal

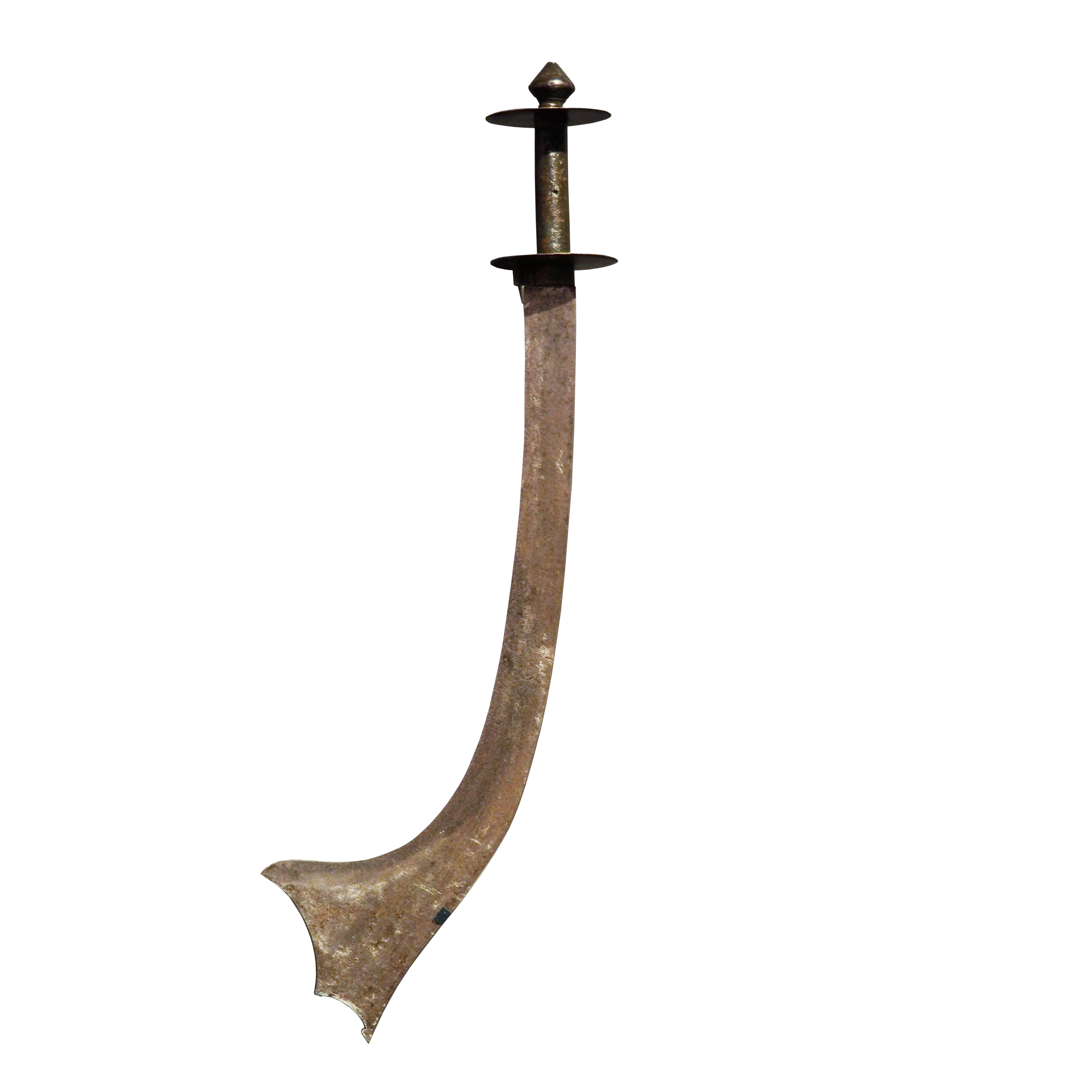
Khora

Kora, also Khora, is a Nepalese and North Indian sword used by the Gurkhas.

The greater part of its weight is concentrated near its point. It increases the power of the blow, however its shape makes it nearly useless for a thrust or draw-cut.

According to a catalog of the India Museum: "The Nepalese use a larger knife or sword Kora with an inner cutting edge with which those who use it skillfully are enabled to cut a sheep in two at a single blow."
