= Cora (name) =

Feminine given name

- Gender: Female

Origin
- Origin: Ancient Greek
- Meaning: girl, maiden, daughter

Other names
- Related names: Coralie, Coraline, Core, Corrine, Corrina, Corrin, Corey, Cory, Kora, Kore, Korra

Cora is a given name with multiple origins. It was used by James Fenimore Cooper for a character in his 1826 novel The Last of the Mohicans. It is today most commonly viewed as a variant name derived from the Ancient Greek Κόρη (Kórē), an epithet of the Greek goddess Persephone. Alternatively, but rarely, it may be rooted in the Gaelic cora, the comparative of cóir, meaning just, honest, virtuous or good. Variant forms of this name include Kora and Korra.

== History ==
The current name Cora may be derived from a variety of origins. Its most prominent antecedents, however, lie in ancient Greece.

=== Ancient Greece ===
The Greek word κόρη (korē) can mean girl, maiden or daughter. In the latter sense it came to be an alternate name given to Persephone to denote her being the daughter of Demeter, who accordingly carries the epithet Μήτηρ (Mētēr), mother. Κόρη was used when addressing Persephone not as queen of the underworld, but as vegetation goddess.

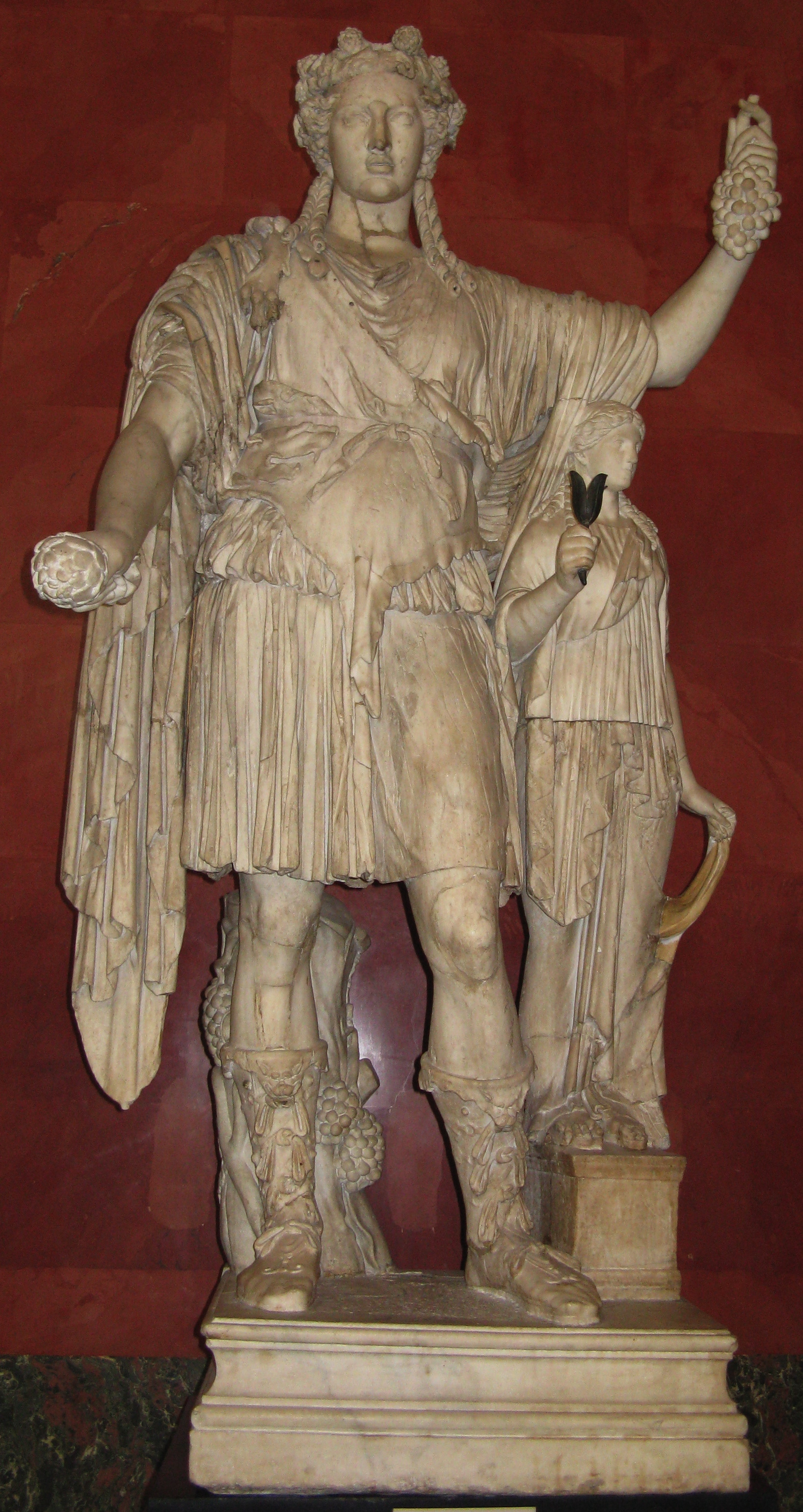
Bacchus and Cora: Roman copy made in the 2nd century after a Greek original

Today's pronunciation of Cora is foreshadowed in some Greek dialects. In both Doric and Aeolic κόρη becomes κόρα (kora), in Doric it also appears as κώρα (kōra), thus phonetically resembling the current English name rather closely. The spelling κόρα is used especially in poetic writings, as in the following instance by Aeschylus:

ἔμολε δ᾽ ᾧ μέλει κρυπταδίου μάχας δολιόφρων ποινά:

ἔθιγε δ᾽ ἐν μάχᾳ χερὸς ἐτήτυμος Διὸς κόρα—Δίκαν δέ νιν

προσαγορεύομεν βροτοὶ τυχόντες καλῶς—

ὀλέθριον πνέουσ᾽ ἐν ἐχθροῖς κότον.

And he has come whose part is the crafty vengeance of stealthy attack,

and in the battle his hand was guided by her who is in very truth daughter of Zeus,

breathing murderous wrath on her foes.

We mortals aim true to the mark when we call her Justice.

As pointed out by H. Weir Smith, Δίκα ("Justice") can be read as a contraction of Δι(ὸς) κ(όρ)α, "daughter of Zeus".

Metaphorically, κόρη and its variants can also refer to a puppet; the pupil of the eye, because a small image is mirrored within, and hence figuratively also the apple of one's eye.

=== Ancient Rome ===
In its current spelling, Cora appears as a Latinisation of Persephone's epithet in Roman inscriptions. Fabia Aconia Paulina for example, who lived in the 4th century, was consecrated to Cora twice.

Of different, namely Celtic, descent is Cora as toponym for a town and river (today la Cure) in the Roman province of Gaul.

=== Modernity ===
In The Court of the Gentiles (1669), his extensive attempt to trace all ancient ideas and beliefs back to Hebrew scriptures, Theophilus Gale claims that Cora originated from the Hebrew הורה (hora).

The name Cora gained prominence among a wider audience through Jean-François Marmontel's novel Les Incas of 1777, where it is given to an Inca girl consecrated as a virgin to the sun. It is thus used much in accordance with the original Greek word. In view of his subject matter – the destruction of the Inca empire ("l'empire du Pérou") following that of the Aztec empire – Marmontel may have found another motive in the ethnic group of the same name, who resisted Spanish conquest until 1722, some 200 years longer than their neighbours (together referred to by him as "l'empire du Mexique").

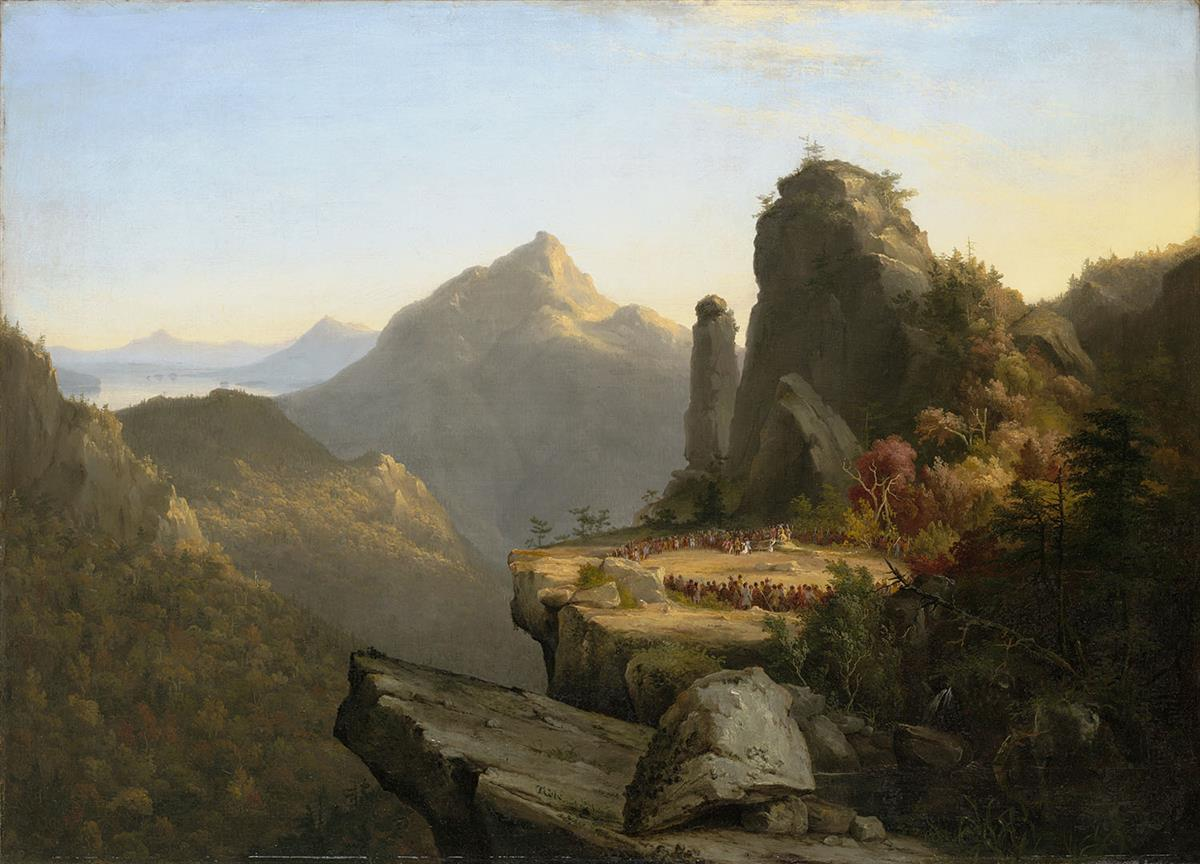
Thomas Cole, Cora Kneeling at the Feet of Tamenund, 1827 – a scene from The Last of the Mohicans

Brought to fame by Marmontel, Cora inspired a series of other works, among them an opera by the French composer Étienne Méhul and a play by the German dramatist August von Kotzebue, Die Sonnenjungfrau (The Virgin of the Sun), both of 1791. Likely to have followed in this tradition, James Fenimore Cooper gave the name Cora to his heroine in The Last of the Mohicans of 1826.

== People ==
=== Athletes ===
- Cora Alicto (Low) (born 1980), track and field sprint athlete who competes for Guam
- Cora Campbell (born 1974), Canadian water polo player
- Cora Combs (1923–2015), American professional wrestler
- Cora Farrell (born 1999), American curler
- Cora Huber (born 1981), Swiss bobsledder
- Cora Livingston (c. 1888 -1957), American professional wrestler
- Cora Mildred Maris Clark (1885–1967), New Zealand hockey player, administrator, and nurse
- Cora Olivero (born 1978), Spanish athlete
- Cora Staunton (born 1981), Irish footballer
- Cora Westland (born 1962), Dutch cyclist

=== Academics ===
- Cora Baggerly Older (1875–1968), American writer and historian
- Cora Baldock (born 1935), Australian-Dutch Sociologist
- Cora Berliner (1890–1942), German economist and social scientist

=== Politicians ===
- Cora Amalia Castilla (born 1961), Mexican politician and activist
- Cora Brown (1914–1972), first African-American woman elected to a U.S. state senate
- Cora Etter (1924–2020), Canadian politician
- Cora Louisa Burrell (1889–1962), New Zealand National Party activist
- Cora Mae Bryant (1926–2008), American blues musician
- Cora Reynolds Anderson (1882–1950), American politician
- Cora Taylor Casselman (1888–1964), Canadian federal politician
- Cora Faith Walker (1960s–2022), American lawyer and politician
- Cora van Nieuwenhuizen (born 1963), Dutch politician

=== Writers ===
- Cora Almerino, Cebuano Visayan writer
- Cora Cané (1923–2016), Argentine journalist
- Cora Daniels, African-American author
- Cora Lenore Williams (1865–1937), American writer and educator
- Cora Linn Daniels (1852–1934), American author
- Cora Minnett (born 1868), Australian author and actress
- Cora Rigby (1865–1930), American journalist
- Cora Rónai (born 1953), Brazilian writer, journalist, and photographer
- Cora Semmes Ives (1834–1916), American writer
- Cora Seton (born 1969), American author
- Cora Sherlock (born 1976), Irish writer, blogger, and campaigner
- Cora Stephan (born 1951), German writer
- Cora Taylor (born 1936), Canadian writer
- Cora Coralina (1889–1985), Brazilian poet

=== Performers ===
- Cora Canne Meijer (1929–2020), Dutch mezzo-soprano and voice teacher
- Cora Cardigan (1860–1931), stage name of Hannah Rosetta Dinah Parks, English flautist
- Cora E. (born 1968), German hip-hop artist
- Cora Folsom Salisbury (1868–1916), American musician and composer
- Cora Gordon (1879–1950), English artist, writer, and musician
- Cora Green (1895–after 1949), American actress, singer, and dancer
- Cora LaRedd (1910–1968), American singer and dancer in the 1920s and 1930s
- Cora Urquhart Brown-Potter (1857–1936), American stage actress
- Cora Venus Lunny (born 1982), Irish violinist
- Cora Waddell (born 1989), Filipino actress, fashion model, and video blogger
- Cora Witherspoon (1890–1957), American actress
- Kora Karvouni (born 1980), Greek actress

=== Others ===
- Cora Lily Woodard Aycock (1868–1952), American political hostess
- Cora Ann Pair Thomas (1875–1952), American Baptist missionary
- Cora Webb Bass (1906–1987), American educator, WAACs officer
- Cora Belle Brewster (1859–?), American physician, surgeon, medical writer, editor
- Cora Bussey Hillis (1858–1924), American child welfare advocate
- Cora Amalia Castilla (born 1961), Mexican politician
- Cora Catherine Calhoun Horne (1865–1932), Black suffragist, civil rights activist, and Atlanta socialite
- Cora Cohen (1943–2023), American artist
- Cora Alta Ray Corniea (1889–1958), American conservationist
- Cora Crane (1868–1910), American businesswoman, nightclub and bordello owner, writer, and journalist
- Cora Diamond (born 1937), American philosopher
- Cora Dow (1868–1915), American pharmacist
- Cora Alice Du Bois (1903–1991), American cultural anthropologist
- Cora Durand (1902–1998), Picuris Pueblo potter
- Cora E. Simpson (1880–1960), American nurse and nursing educator
- Cora Elm (1891–1949), American nurse in World War I
- Cora Emmanuel (born 1992), French fashion model
- Cora Evans (1904–1957), American Mormon leader
- Cora G. Burwell (1883–1982), American astronomical researcher
- Cora Goffin (1902–2004), British actress
- Cora Gooseberry (c. 1777–1852), Aboriginal Australian Murro-ore-dial woman and cultural knowledge keeper
- Cora Harrington, American writer and lingerie expert
- Cora Hartshorn (1873–1958), American pioneer in the field of birth control
- Cora Helena Sarle (1867–1956), American Shaker artist
- Cora Hubbard (1877–?), American outlaw
- Cora Huidekoper Clarke (1851–1916), American amateur entomologist, science educator, and botanist
- Cora Jipson Beckwith (1875–1955), American zoologist
- Cora Johnstone Best (1878–1930), American mountaineer
- Cora Kelley Ward (1920–1989), American painter and photographer
- Cora Laparcerie (1875–1951), French comedian, poet, and director
- Cora LeEthel Christian, the first native woman of the U.S. Virgin Islands to earn a medical degree
- Cora Martin-Moore (1927–2005), American gospel singer
- Cora Miao (born 1958), Chinese actress
- Cora Millet-Robinet (1798–1890), French agricultural innovator and silk producer
- Cora Nyegaard (1812–1891), Danish composer
- Cora Pearl (1835–1886), French courtesan
- Cora Scott Pond Pope (1856–?), American teacher, scriptwriter, real estate developer
- Cora Randolph Trimble (1871–1946), American socialite
- Cora Ratto de Sadosky (1912–1981), Argentine mathematician, educator, and militant activist
- Cora Sadosky de Goldstein (1940–2010), Argentine mathematician
- Cora Sandel (1880–1974), Norwegian painter and writer
- Cora Schumacher (born 1976), German actress, model, racing driver, and presenter
- Cora L. V. Scott (1840–1923), American medium
- Cora Skinner (born 1985), American glamour model and actress
- Cora Slocomb di Brazza (1862–1944), American-born Italian activist and businesswoman
- Cora Smalley Brooks (1885–1930), American painter
- Cora Smith Eaton (1867–1939), American suffragist, physician, and mountaineer
- Cora Sternberg (born 1951), American medical oncologist
- Cora Sue Collins (1927–2025), American former child actress
- Cora Sutton Castle (1880–1966), American educator, Sociologist, author, and clubwoman
- Cora Camoin (1930–2018), French actress
- Cora Walker (1922–2006), American lawyer
- Cora Walton (1928–2009), birth name of American Blues singer Koko Taylor
- Cora Stuart Wheeler (1852–1897), American poet, author
- Cora Wilding (1888–1982), New Zealand physiotherapist and artist
- Cora Wilson Stewart (1875–1958), American social reformer and educator

=== As a surname ===
- Alex Cora (born 1975), Puerto Rican professional baseball player and team manager
- Belle Cora (1827?–1862), American Madam of the Barbary Coast
- Cat Cora (born 1967), American chef on Food Network's Iron Chef America
- Joey Cora (born 1965), Puerto Rican former professional baseball player
- Sexy Cora or Carolin Ebert (1987–2011), German actress, model, and singer
- Stefanía Cora (born 1989), Argentine politician
- Tayfun Cora (born 1983), Turkish footballer
- Tom Cora (1953–1998), American cellist

=== Fictional characters ===
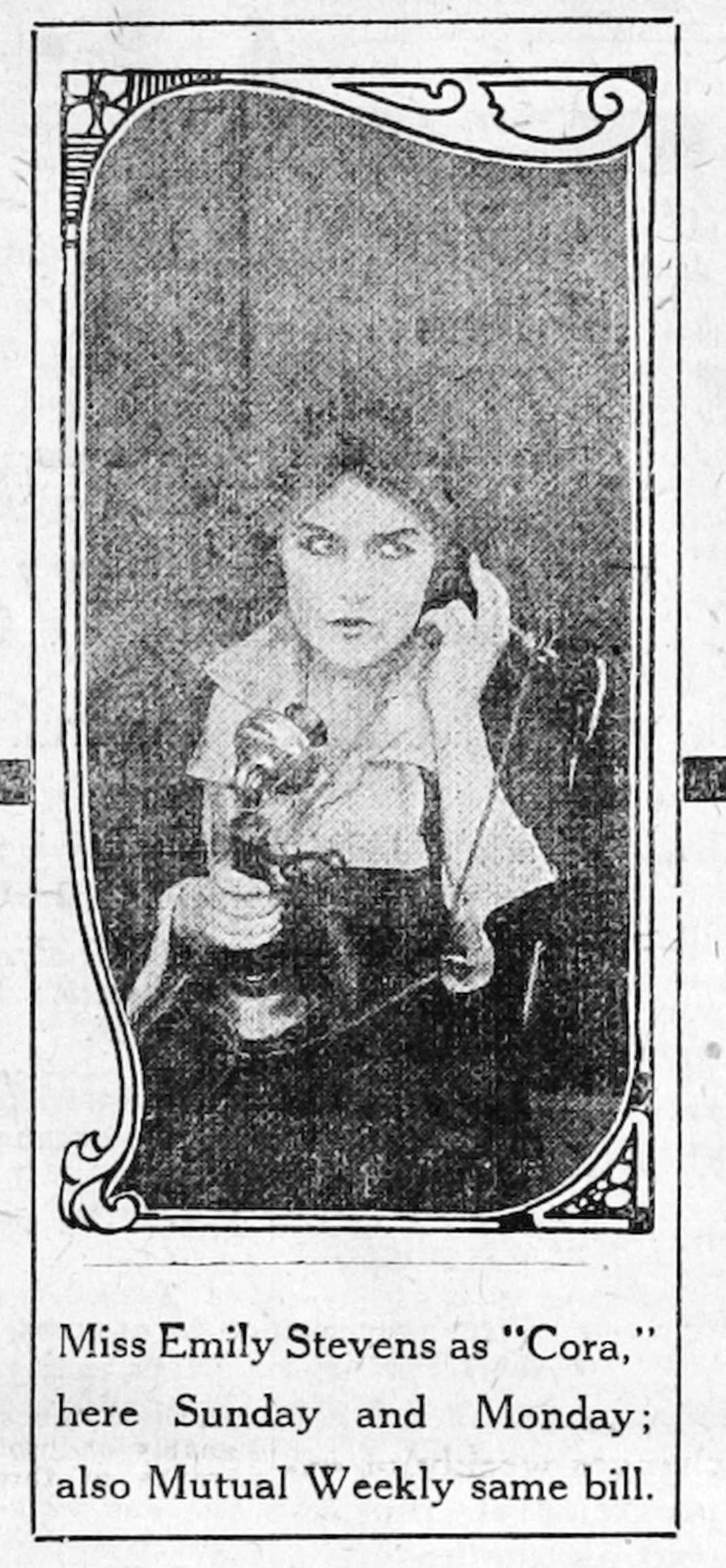
Newspaper advertisement for the 1915 film Cora

- Cora, the main character of the 1915 film of the same name directed by Edwin Carewe
- Cora Crawley, from the series Downton Abbey
- Cora Cross, from the United Kingdom soap EastEnders
- Cora Dithers, from the comic strip Blondie
- Cora Flange, from Carry On Abroad
- Cora Peterson, from the 1966 science fiction film Fantastic Voyage
- Cora Mills (also known as the Queen of Hearts), from the fantasy-drama series Once Upon a Time
- Cora Ann Milton, from The Ringer, a play by Edgar Wallace
- Cora Munro, heroine of The Last of the Mohicans, by James Fenimore Cooper
- Cora Tannetti, from the Netflix original series The Sinner
- Cora Hale, from the MTV series Teen Wolf
- Cora Hamilton, from the 2017 film Rip Tide
- Cora Cartmell, from Titanic
- Cora Orvat, a super-agent from the Cora Orvat series of ironic science fiction crime/mystery noves by Kir Bulychev
- Cora, protagonist of The Underground Railroad, by Colson Whitehead
- Cora, a shopkeeper in television commercials for Maxwell House coffee portrayed by Margaret Hamilton
- Cora Jean Simmons, the daughter of Madea
- Cora Tull, a narrator and fictional character from Faulkner's As I Lay Dying
- Cora Thayer Prescott, aunt of the main character of the Netflix series Spirit Riding Free
- Korra, the main character of the animated television series The Legend of Korra
- Cora Seaborne, the main character of the novel and TV Series The Essex Serpent
- Cora Harper, from the video game Mass Effect

== See also ==
- Cora (disambiguation)
- Kora (disambiguation)
