= American Indians in World War I =

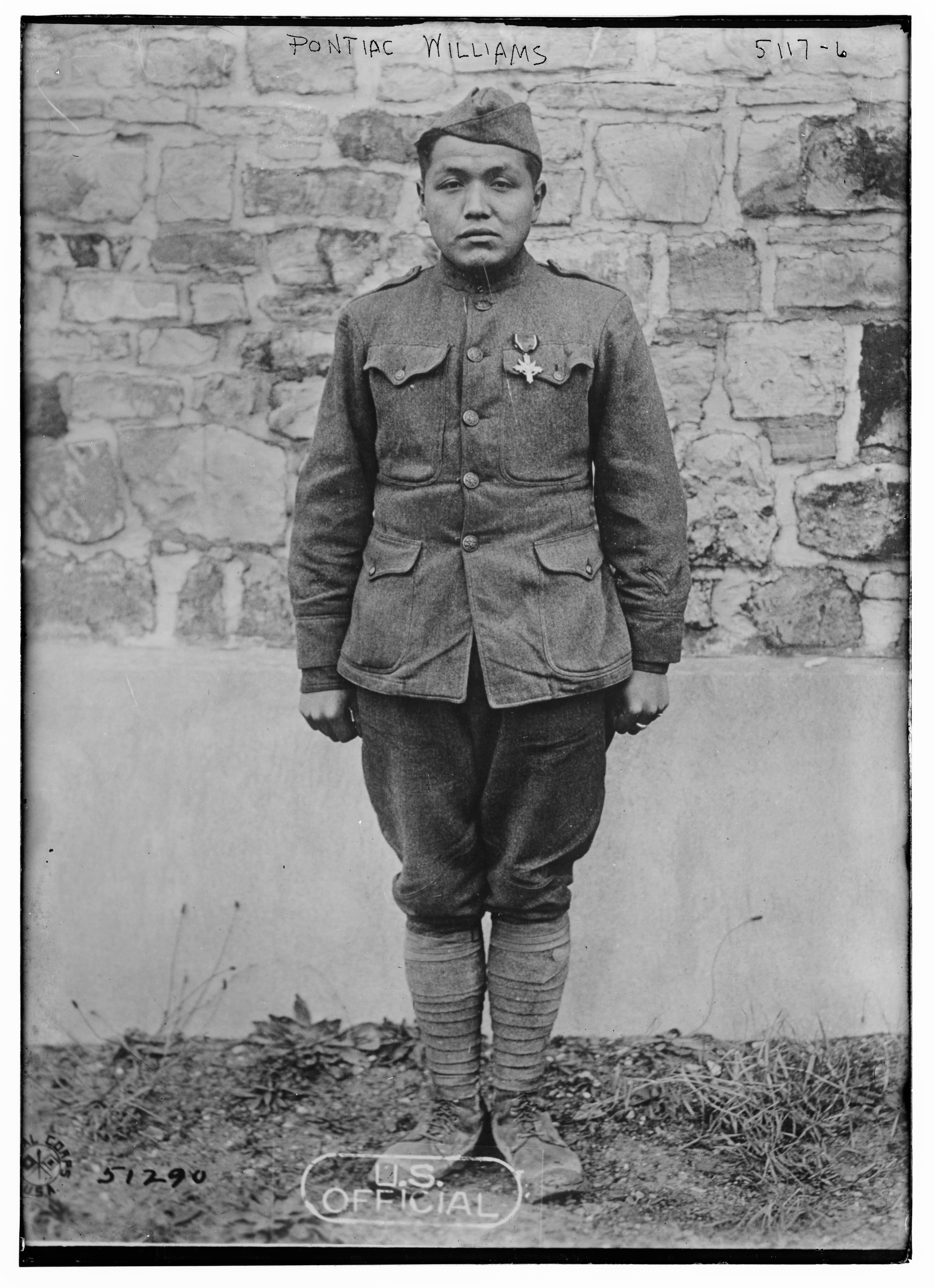
Pontiac Williams, an Odawa, was awarded the Croix de Guerre for bravery.

American Indians in World War I describes the contribution and the experience of Native Americans (Indians) during World War I. In 1917, the number of Indians in the United States totaled about 300,000 and in Canada about 100,000. About one-half of them were not citizens even though they had been born in the United States or Canada. Several pathways to citizenship existed in the United States, but not all Indians qualified or attempted to fulfill the requirements to become citizens.

Under the U.S. Selective Service Act of 1917 all young men, including non-citizen Indians, were required to register for military conscription, the "draft". The U.S. government estimated that the number of Indians who registered for the draft was 17,313. Six thousand five hundred and nine were estimated to have been inducted into the military. More than 5,000 Indians joined the military voluntarily. The 12,000 Indians who served in the military during World War I made up about 20 to 30 percent of young American Indian men. That was a higher percentage of Indians in the military than in the non-Indian population. Only about 15 percent of all American men served in the military. About five percent of the Indians in the military were killed during the war compared to a death rate of about one percent among all men who served in the American Expeditionary Forces.

More than 4,000 Canadian Indians served in the military during World War I. Hundreds were wounded or killed and more than 50 were given medals for bravery.

Although most Indians served with distinction in the U.S. military, a few incidents of resistance to the draft occurred. The Indian soldier returning home after the war highlighted the many economic and social problems on Indian reservations although the government was slow to act to attempt to solve those problems. In 1924, the U.S. adopted the Indian Citizenship Act which gave citizenship to all Indians born in the United States.

Only partial information exists detailing the numbers and contributions of American Indians in World War I. Joseph K. Dixon collected detailed information on 2,846 Indians who were in the military. The Office of Indian Affairs recorded in brief detail the service of more than 5,000.

== Assimilation ==
Prior to World War I, the policy of the United States government toward its Indian residents was forced assimilation. The aim of that policy was expressed by Captain Richard Henry Pratt in 1892: "Kill the Indian in him, and save the man." The U.S. attempted to eradicate Indian culture, language, and tribal identification through a series of measures such as Indian boarding schools which forced Indian children to dress like whites, attend church, and prohibited them from speaking in their native languages. The assimilation policy also initiated "allotment" to encourage private property and capitalism among Indians. Lands within Indian Reservations was divided into individual allotments of 160 acres for each tribal member. The allotment program was a disguised land grab as much former Indian land was not allotted to Indians but rather sold to white farmers and ranchers.

== Indian soldiers before World War I ==
American Indian soldiers had a long history of serving in the U.S. military. Haudenosaunee (Iroquois) served with George Washington in the Revolutionary War. During the Civil War Indian soldiers and armies fought on both sides of the conflict. in 1866, the U.S. army was allowed to enlist one thousand Indian scouts to fight with the army against other Indians. General George Crook gave credit to his Apache scouts for winning the Indian wars of the southwestern United States, saying that "regular troops are as helpless as a whale attacked by a school of sword-fish." Indian scouts were awarded sixteen Medals of Honor.

Various attempts were made to create Indian units within the U.S. army. They failed, mostly due to indifference by the government and army. However, in 1916, General John J. Pershing enlisted twenty Apache scouts in his campaign to punish Pancho Villa for his raid into the United States. In one battle they captured seventy of Villa's soldiers. The Apache were resistant to control and discipline and fought with their traditional tactics rather than as U.S. cavalrymen. White soldiers expressed animosity to the Apache scouts, calling them "Pershing's Pets."

== The "Great War" ==
Canada joined the United Kingdom in the war against Germany in 1914. It initially exempted all non-citizen Indians from military service, but about 35 percent of Indian young men enlisted. Canada resisted the idea of creating all-Indian units, but by 1915, several companies, including the officers, were made up of Iroquois. Indian heroes in the Canadian army included sniper Francis Pegahmagabow, an Ojibwe, who was credited with killing or wounding 378 Germans. Another Ojibwe, David Keesick, was given a medal for leading an assault on German trenches and capturing 87 Germans.

The entry of the United States into World War I in April 1917 required the U.S. army to undertake a very large and fast expansion from its pre-war numbers of 127,000 officers and men. An issue was whether Indians would serve in segregated units or be integrated into regular army units. Some officials and Indians argued for integration into the regular army; others advocated segregated units rather than assimilation. The assimilationists won the argument. Nevertheless, the 142nd Infantry Regiment of the Panther division had Indians from 14 tribes in its ranks. One company was made up almost entirely of Indians from Oklahoma. A few Indians became officers.

About 1,000 American Indians served in the Navy, a few served in the Marine Corps, and about 500 served in the air squadrons. About 10,000 served in the U.S. Army, mostly in the infantry as foot soldiers. Volunteers mostly spoke English and were educated, some in universities; they were applauded by both Indian and white leaders as being "modern and American". Conscripts were usually less acculturated. Indian soldiers were attributed to have "natural characteristics and dispositions" toward war which led to them being assigned to the most dangerous tasks of snipers, scouts, and runners (message carriers). They were said to prefer working alone, rather than with a group, which suited them for those tasks. Invariably called "chief", the Indian soldier "sought validation in a traditional ideal of warriorhood...Indian soldiers who found refuge in a warrior self-image helped reinforce racial stereotypes." The warrior image was magnified by their tribes when they returned safely from the war. They were honored with traditional ceremonies.

Indian soldiers in World War I received 150 citations for bravery from the United States and 26 received the Croix de Guerre from France and one from Belgium. The U.S. Medal of Honor was not awarded to soldiers for service in World War I, but in 2024, the policy had changed and the military announced that 24 World War I American Indians were among those under consideration for the Medal of Honor.

=== Code talkers ===
In 1918, the U.S. army realized that the Germans were intercepting and translating wireless messages to gain advantage on the battlefield. The army turned to Indians to transmit messages in their native languages which Germans would find difficult or impossible to translate. The first documented code talkers were Eastern Band Cherokee. The best known were eighteen Choctaw in the 142nd Infantry of the 36th Infantry Division. The Choctaw codetalkers coordinated an artillery attack which resulted in a U.S. victory. Cheyenne, Comanche, Ho-Chunk, Osage, and Yankton Sioux codetalkers were also used. One of the codetalkers, a Choctaw named Joseph Oklahombi, led a group of soldiers who captured an German machine gun and turned it on the Germans. Oklahombi was awarded U.S. medals plus the Croix de Guerre by France.

As many military terms had no equivalent in Indian languages, terms had to be invented by the code talkers. For example, in the Indian languages, "company" was "bow"; battalion became "twice big group", a machine gun was "fast shooting gun" and "big gun" meant artillery.

=== The "home front" ===
Fifteen of the 25 Indians from Carlisle Indian School who built ships at Hog Island, Philadelphia.

Ten thousand Indians joined the Red Cross and, despite the widespread poverty among them, bought twenty-five million dollars worth of Liberty bonds. Indian women in the Red Cross wrapped bandages and made clothing for soldiers. Fourteen female Indian nurses from Canada or the United Statres have been identified as serving with the U.S. Army in France during the war. Others probably served with the Red Cross and other organizations. Initially nurses had to be white. That policy was changed to allow Indian nurses to serve, although African-American nurses were still excluded. The nurses crossed the Atlantic by ship at a time when German U-boats were still a danger. One of the nurses, Cora Elm, an Iroquois, remained in Europe for two years after the war to work in the Baltic states during the Russian Revolution. Another Iroquois, Edith Monture, was the first Canadian Indian to become a nurse. At least three Indian doctors served in the Army Medical Corps while others served as ambulance drivers.

Two Osage Indians, author John Joseph Mathews and Clarence L. Tinker (later a General officer) were flight instructors training military pilots. Nine American Indian military pilots have been identified. Joseph James Clark, a Cherokee, became the first Indian to graduate from U.S. Naval Academy in 1917. He later became an admiral. The son of sports star Jim Thorpe also served in the Navy.

== Resistance ==
Most young men from most Indian tribes volunteered or accepted being drafted into military service, but in a few instances Indians resisted being inducted. In Utah, the Goshute resisted registration for conscription. Several Goshute men were arrested and the Goshute threatened armed resistance. The army was called in and 100 Goshute were detained and six arrested. The incipient rebellion ended with the release of the arrested men and the registration of 163 Goshute men.

In New York, the conscription law was seen by the Iroquois as weakening their autonomy to rule themselves, already under pressure from many quarters. In Oklahoma a few Creek and Seminole joined the Green Corn Rebellion against the war and conscription. Navajo and Utes also protested conscription as they believed it violated their rights as sovereign peoples.

== Aftermath ==
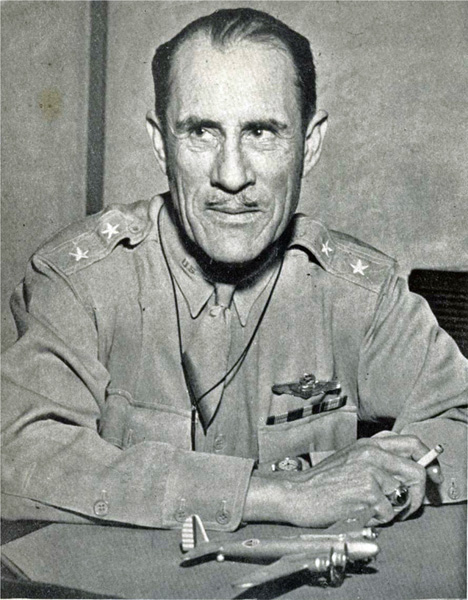
Clarence L. Tinker, an Osage who served during World War II and became the highest-ranking Native American in the U.S. Army.

With the end of the war and return home, the U.S. government and local communities lavished praise on the Indian soldiers. However, the government was much less disposed to pass legislation to solve Indian problems. Many Indian soldiers returned to reservations "with high rates of unemployment, poor health, disenfranchisement, and illiteracy." Some of the soldiers and their relatives on the reservations found that they could not even cash the Liberty Bonds they had purchased because their U.S.-appointed guardians declared them incompetent to manage their affairs. New York state officials declared that Indians were not eligible to receive the bonuses given all other war veterans. That policy was reversed in 1921 after a public outcry. In 1923, an Indian author described Oklahoma's treatment of Indians as "an orgy of graft and exploitation." Efforts to deprive Indians of their land continued throughout the United States.

On the positive side, Indian soldiers returning home were more capable of interacting with and challenging the institutions of the United States. In 1919, former Indian soldiers were granted citizenship on request but few were aware of or took advantage of the opportunity. In 1924 all Indians born in the United States were declared citizens by the Indian Citizenship Act. Ex-soldiers became more culturally and politically active. Rather than the assimilation and adoption of white culture the government anticipated as a consequence of their military service, former soldiers and other Indians began to value and practice their traditional songs, dances, and ceremonies which had been prohibited by the U.S. government. In 1934 the Indian Reorganization Act, although controversial, reversed the assimilationist policy of the U.S. and granted Indians the right to establish tribal governments, protect reservation land, and progress toward economic self-sufficiency.
