= Cora =

Cora may refer to:

== Science ==
- Cora (fungus), a genus of lichens
- Cora (damselfly), a genus of damselflies
- CorA metal ion transporter, a Mg2+ influx system

== People ==
- Cora (name), a given name and surname
- Cora E. (born 1968), German hip-hop artist
- Sexy Cora or Carolin Ebert (1987–2011), German actress, model, singer

== Places ==
=== United States ===
- Cora, Illinois
- Cora, Kansas
- Cora, Missouri
- Cora, West Virginia
- Cora, Washington
- Cora, Wyoming

=== Other places ===
- Cora (Ancient Latin town), an ancient town in Latium (Italy)
- Cori, Lazio, Italy

== Other uses ==
- 504 Cora, a metallic asteroid from the middle region of the asteroid belt
- Cora (hypermarket), a retail group of hypermarkets in Europe
- Cora (instrument), an alternative spelling of the West African musical instrument Kora
- Cora (opera), a 1791 opera by Étienne Méhul, libretto by Valadier
- Cora (restaurant), a Canadian chain of casual restaurants
- Cora (rocket), a French rocket
- Cora (1812 ship), a brig that was wrecked in 1821
- Colorado Open Records Act, state-level freedom of information legislation
- CORA dataset (Coriolis Ocean database ReAnalysis), a free global oceanographic temperature and salinity dataset
- Cora people, an indigenous ethnic group of Western Central Mexico
- Cora language
- The Cora branch of the Huchiti, people in Baja California
- CORA, a typesetting language from Mergenthaler Linotype Company
- Tropical Storm Cora (disambiguation)
- Cora (film), a 1915 American silent drama film
- Cora by Wisk autonomous personal air vehicle

== See also ==
- Cora-cora, large outrigger warships from the Philippines
- Coras (disambiguation)
- Kora (disambiguation)
- Tropical Storm Cora, a list of storms
