= Brantford Collegiate Institute =

Brantford Collegiate Institute & Vocational School

Location
- 120 Brant Ave; Brantford, Ontario, N3T 3H3; Canada; 43°8′35″N 80°16′25″W

Information
- School type: Public, High School
- Founded: 1910
- School board: Grand Erie District School Board
- Principal: Geoff Stead
- Grades: 9–12 (13th year optional)
- Language: English
- Colours: Blue and gold
- Mascot: Mack The Mustang
- Website: www.granderie.ca/schools/bci

Brantford Collegiate Institute and Vocational School, also known as "Brantford Collegiate Institute" or "BCI", is a secondary school in the city of Brantford. It is a member of the Grand Erie District School Board, a medium-sized school board in the Province of Ontario. About 1300 students attend BCI. BCI has many sports teams, clubs, and an active Library Learning Commons.

== History ==
BCI traces its roots to 1909, but also succeeded what was then called Brantford Grammar School, which opened in 1852 to provide secondary education prior to 1871. After 1871 the school was re-classified as a High School with the passage of the Act to Improve the Common and Grammar Schools of the Province of Ontario.

== Sports Teams ==
BCI has many sports teams that compete in the local, provincial and national levels. Teams include Badminton, Junior Girls Basketball, Senior Girls Basketball, Boys Basketball, Cross Country, Curling, Girls Fastball, Boys Baseball, Football, Golf, Girls Hockey, Boys Hockey, Midget Boys Rugby, Junior Girls Rugby, Junior Boys Rugby, Senior Girls Rugby, Senior Boys Rugby, Girls Soccer, Boys Soccer, Swimming, Tennis, Track and Field, Junior Girls Volleyball, Junior Boys Volleyball, Senior Girls Volleyball, Senior Boys Volleyball, Triathlon and Wrestling.

BCI is well known for having one of the most consistent rugby programs in Ontario. BCI teams are competitive and have historically won many championships - in 2023, the varsity girls team won their 13th straight city championship. BCI has won several provincial championships and regularly receives invites to travel overseas to compete against club teams.

== Clubs ==
BCI has a number of active clubs including Acceptance For All, Anime club, Asian Heritage Club, A/V Club, Black Student's Association, Chess club, Eco Club, Fishing Team, Impact (Christian club), Link Crew, a Mock Trial Team, Newspaper Club, NTS Drama Club, STEAM Club, Student's Council, and Yearbook club.

== Programs ==
The school offers many programs which aid students in deciding their path after secondary school. The BCI-Laurier Program is a partnership between Laurier Brantford and Brantford Collegiate Institute which began in 1999. The mandate of the program is to provide enrichment for students in the area of Leadership, Teamwork and Presentation through an integration model. Students take academic level courses and work collaboratively with their peers in focused classes over the four years of high school. BCI-Laurier program students have the opportunity to develop confidence in their ability to lead, to be an effective member of a team, and to speak publicly to small and large groups. The Laurier program stopped accepting new applicants after 2021/2022 school year due to a variety of factors including the de-streaming of grade nine classrooms in Ontario. The final Laurier class is set to graduate in the 2024/2025 school year.

The school also offers many Specialist High Skills Major(SHSM) programs, offered exclusively to grade 11s and 12s. These programs are designed to offer students the courses based on their decisions for post secondary. As of 2024, BCI offers a Health, Fitness and Wellness SHSM, as well as a Manufacturing SHSM.

BCI also offers a French immersion program that allows students to delve deeper into their French studies through additional classes offered in the language. This normally culminates with the students taking the DELF test at the end of their grade twelve year to get officially graded on the subject.

== Relocation controversy ==
BCI is Brantford's oldest school and has stood as a historic landmark since 1909. For a considerable time, the city and the Grand Erie District School Board worked on a plan to update and renovate the deteriorating school building in its original location on Brant Avenue. Significant controversy resulted upon the school board's reversal of its plan to rebuild BCI in its original location – there are now new plans involving moving the school to Shellard Lane.

=== Decisions taken by the Board ===
In November 1997 the Brant County Board of Education presented a report entitled "Planning for our Future – a Master Plan and Education Program for the Future Development of BCI", which recommended rebuilding the school on its original site. No follow-up decision was made and the issue was left with the then newly amalgamated Grand Erie District School Board (which was created on 1 January 1999) to resolve.

In the summer of 2002, the Board received a report from its senior administration which encouraged trustees to deal with this issue. An ad hoc committee was established and supported rebuilding BCI on its current site. In October 2004 a "Comprehensive Facility Audit" was completed by Jacques Whitford Limited. The report, which was submitted to the Board in April 2005, documented work that would need to be completed over the next 10 years totalling C$12.2million. The report only included basic work which would not deal with issues such as accessibility.

In May 2005 the Board decided by motion to move forward with a community forum and to write to the Minister of Education to request financial assistance in order to revitalise BCI.

That fall, the BCI community forums were held. By all accounts the process was positive and the consensus was that any redevelopment of BCI should be on its current site. On 6 February 2006 the Board in Committee of the Whole approved moving forward with architectural services (provided by MMMC Architects) to assist the Design Committee examining options for the redevelopment of BCI. The options included building a new school on a new site as well as redeveloping BCI on its current site.

On 12 June 2006 the Board in Committee of the Whole approved moving forward with a "Request for Proposals" (RFP) for the architectural services for BCI's redevelopment, and directed the administration to prepare a report on transition plans and costs. In August 2006 the trustees passed a motion with a two-thirds majority to reopen discussion on the location of BCI. On 14 September 2006 another public forum was held. This time the discussion was on how to accommodate BCI students during the school's redevelopment. Parents of students attending other secondary schools in Brantford attended and objected to having their own children's schools disrupted and put on shifts to accommodate BCI students during reconstruction at BCI. Approximately 600 people attended this meeting in which the Board's presentation addressed the rebuilding of BCI on a new site as well as accommodating BCI on the existing site.

On 2 October 2006 administration presented a plan to rebuild BCI on the existing site while keeping the students on site. The option would increase the costs of the project and delay its completion to 2010. On 16 October 2006 a motion was approved to confirm that BCI would be rebuilt on its current site at a cost not to exceed C$30million. An RFP was approved for an architect and a construction manager.

On 20 November 2006 the Walter Fedy Partnership were selected as architects and engineers, and Atlas Construction were selected as construction managers.

On 8 January 2007, the Board agreed to seek permission from the Minister of Education to adjust the school day to accommodate shifts at BCI while the redevelopment was taking place, and on 26 February the Minister gave his approval. The plan called for the use of shifts, together with the use of the 1960s wing of BCI, portables and nearby Victoria School.

On 19 March 2007 cost estimates for the BCI development on site were reported to be C$33,372,958, which included an auditorium at an approximate cost of C$2.7million (which the Alumni committed to raise funds for) and $30,647,969 for a school on a new site. The operating costs for the new school on its current site would be greater because of the additional floor area, but the bussing costs would be greater at the original site.

The Board moved a motion at the meeting on 19 March to go in-camera and discuss a property issue. The property being considered by the board was located in West Brantford on Shellard Lane, which is owned by the city. Board officials had no written information from the city to explain the planning issues but they reported to the trustees that permission could quickly be obtained from the city to build a school. The trustees were told that the Board would be responsible for the costs of some services since the land would not have access to all city services for a number of years.

=== School Council's reaction ===
The BCI Council expressed concerns about the process used by the Board. They felt they were misled on the issue because prior to the municipal election in 2006, the Board appeared to have taken the position in favour of rebuilding BCI at its original location, which was then reversed after the 2006 election. The Council reviewed the events of the previous several years where the Board consistently re-confirmed its decision to rebuild BCI on its current site. They praised the community forums as good vehicles to seek input.

The Council pointed to the relationship that BCI had with Wilfrid Laurier University, which had a campus in downtown Brantford. Mohawk College and Nipissing University are also considered to have similar relationships with BCI. The council's concern was that the new site for BCI was too far away from the city's downtown area to maintain these relationships.

At the time of the relocation decision the vast majority of students walked to BCI. If the school were to be relocated to the proposed new location that would become unfeasible, and therefore the school Board would be met with a significant cost in terms of student transport.

The School Council did not agree with the Board that enrollment would increase significantly at the new site for BCI, and felt that the data used by the Board, taken from 2001 Census, was out of date. Their belief was that new provincial policy called for intensification and infilling and that would increase enrollment at the BCI downtown location. Council said that they were shocked by the Board's reversal and they believe the decision was made without a commitment that land would be available for the relocated BCI within a short time frame.

=== Local Reaction ===
The city's Mayor and councillors, and the administration for the city were upset that the Board reversed its course without any discussion with the city. The Mayor said that he had heard about the Board's decision on the radio. The issue was particularly important to the city because a lot of work and planning to revitalise the downtown area had begun to show results. With Nipissing and Wilfrid Laurier Universities as well as Mohawk College located in the city's core, more people were working and attending school downtown, which was beneficial for downtown businesses. The province was encouraging intensification, and infilling was viewed as good for the environment.

The City said that demographics were not showing growth in south-west Brant and therefore building a new school in the area was difficult to comprehend.

The Mayor of Brantford outlined the timelines for the necessary amendment of the official plans which needed completing before the proposed school site could be developed. The city also indicated that since other development was unlikely to occur for several years, the Board would be responsible for the installation of necessary services for the new school.

=== Minister of Education's remarks ===
Remarks by Ontario's Minister of Education, Kathleen Wynne, the school's relocation included:

"During my consultations in Brantford it became clear that some members of the community viewed this fact-finding process as an appeal of the Board’s decision concerning the future of BCI. They wanted the decision overturned by the Ministry of Education. It is important that everyone involved in this very difficult community issue understand that Ontario’s Education Act is the legal framework and it sets out who does what in the delivery of public education. The Ministry does not have the power to overrule locally elected school boards as long as their decisions respect the Education Act and the policy guidelines set by the Ministry."

"School boards are democratically elected to make decisions that are best made at the community level. It would be inappropriate, and not in the best interest of public education, to have every school accommodation issue, all across this vast Province made in Toronto. In this particular case it is clear that the board has exclusive power to make this decision."

"I was asked many times; "How is the board held accountable?” Clearly the board is accountable to the community. Ultimately trustees seek re-election and this democratic process provides direct accountability."

"However in the exercise of this power, trustees and boards must be transparent, inclusive and respectful of the community they represent. Board decisions must serve the best interest of the community and of course their students."

=== Renovation at original location ===
The school was renovated at the original location between 2008 and 2011.

== Distinguished alumni ==
- Sara Jeannette Duncan – novelist (1861–1922)
- Emily Pauline Johnson (Tekahionwake) – author and performer (1862–1913)
- Thomas B. Costain – journalist and author (1885–1965)
- Edith Monture - first Indigenous-Canadian woman to become a registered nurse, gain the right to vote in a Canadian federal election, first Indigenous woman from Canada to serve in the United States military (1890–1996)
- Dr. James Hillier – physicist and inventor (1915–2007)
- Dr. John Basmajian – medical researcher (1921–2008)
- Nick Kaczur – NFL Offensive Lineman – New England Patriots (2005–2011)
- Paul Kneale—Internationally renowned Artist (1986—Present)
- Aaron Carpenter – Team Canada Rugby (2005–Present)
- Mike Filer- CFL Offensive Lineman – Hamilton Tiger-Cats (2012–Present)
- Mike Beres- Olympic Badminton Player (2000–2008)
- Scott Wilson & Justin Lukach - hosts of the television series Departures (2008-2010)

Additional alumni biographies and names can be found in the 'Alumni Lounge' of BCI's 1910 wing, near the old main entrance.
