= Pope Park =

Pope Park may refer to:

in the United States

(by state)

- Pope Park (Sylvester, Georgia), a park in Sylvester, Georgia
- Pope Park (Connecticut), an Olmstead Brothers-designed park
- Pope John Paul II Park Reservation, in Neponset, Massachusetts, also known as Pope Park
- Pope Park (Michigan), in Hamtramck and/or Detroit, Michigan
- Pope Park (Fayetteville, North Carolina), a park in Cumberland County, North Carolina
- Pope Park (Madison County, Tennessee)
- Pope Park (Corpus Christi, Texas)

See also:

- Mount Pope Provincial Park, in British Columbia, Canada
