= Paulo Rónai =

Hungarian-Brazilian philologist

- Pál Rónai
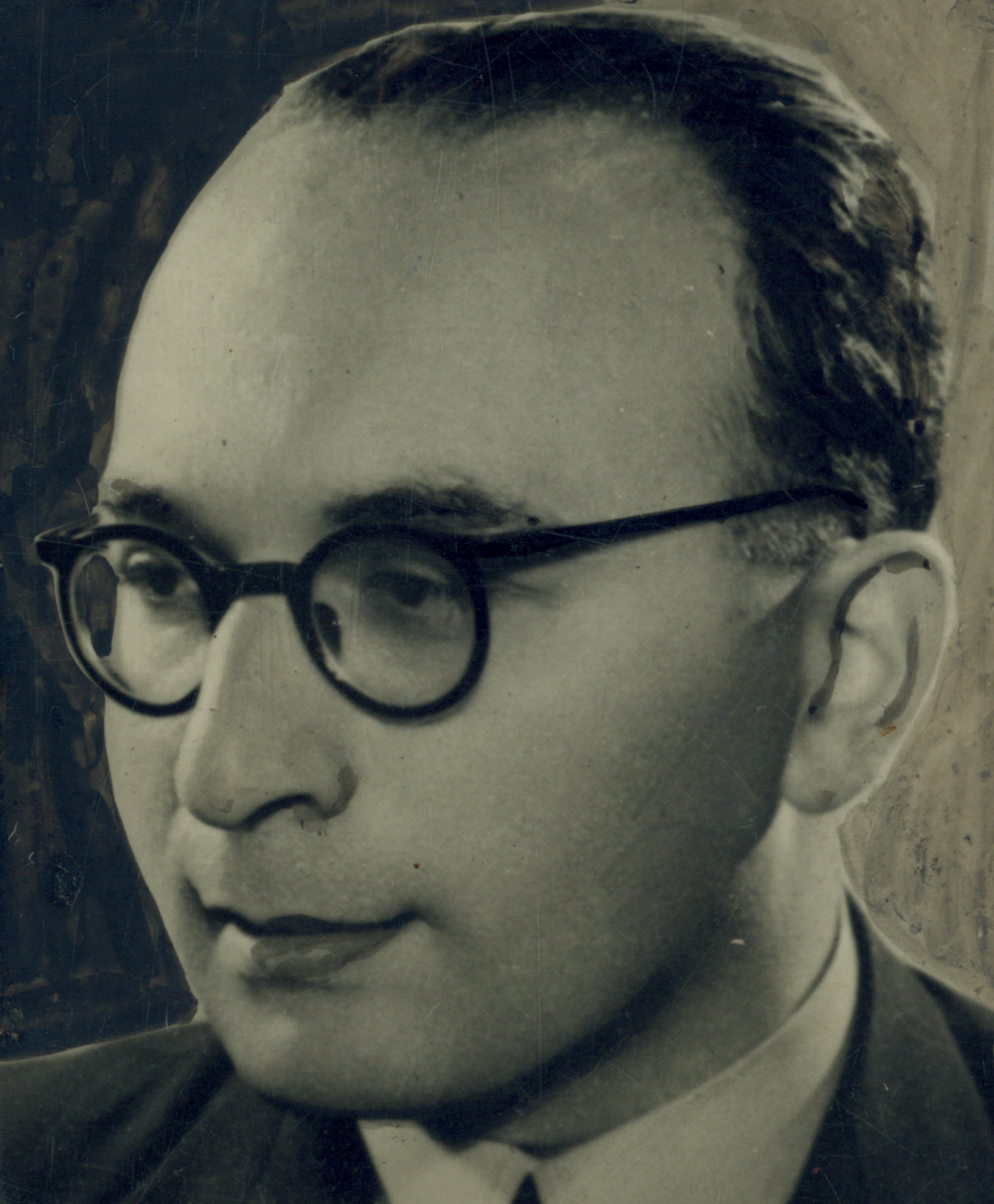
- Rónai in 1965
- Born: Rónai Pál; April 13, 1907; Budapest, Kingdom of Hungary, Austria-Hungary
- Died: December 1, 1992 (aged 85); Nova Friburgo, Rio de Janeiro, Brazil
- Occupations: Translator, philologist, literary critic

Paulo Rónai (Hungarian: Rónai Pál; 13 April 1907 - 1 December 1992) was a Hungarian-Brazilian translator, philologist, and critic.

== Biography ==
Rónai Pál was born in the Hungarian capital Budapest into a Jewish family. He completed his primary studies in his native country, but also studied in France and Italy before transferring to Brazil due to World War II. There, he developed friendly relations with Aurélio Buarque de Holanda Ferreira - with whom he signed several works -, Cecília Meireles, Carlos Drummond de Andrade, Guimarães Rosa, among others. His works include the translations into Portuguese of the hundreds of short stories collected in the anthology Mar de Histórias (Ed. Nova Fronteira), as well as organising and editing a commented, reviewed and annotated version of Balzac's Comedie Humaine by Editora Globo. Ronai was married to Nora Tausz, with whom he had two daughters, Cora Rónai, journalist and writer, and Laura Rónai, baroque flutist and professor at the Federal University of the State of Rio de Janeiro.

== Awards ==
- 1983 Prêmio Machado de Assis
