= Nora Tausz Rónai =

Brazilian swimmer (born 1924)

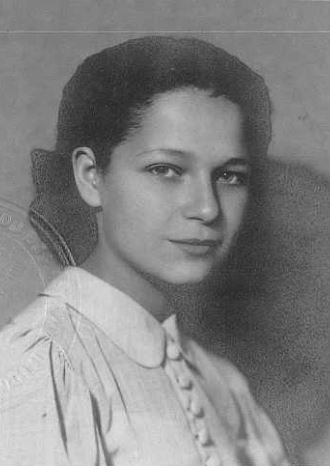
- Rónai in 1940
- Born: 29 February 1924 (age 102); Fiume, Italy
- Education: Federal University of Rio de Janeiro
- Occupations: Holocaust survivor, architect, writer and swimmer
- Spouse: Paulo Rónai (m. 1952, d. 1992)

Nora Tausz Rónai (born 29 February 1924) is a Brazilian Holocaust survivor, architect, writer and masters swimmer. After a career as a professor of descriptive geometry, she began competing internationally as a Masters swimmer in 1993. She has won 13 gold medals and has broken both national and regional records for her age group.

== Family and early life ==
Rónai was born on 29 February 1924 in Fiume (at the time in Italy, now Rijeka, in Croatia). She spent four years living in Budapest as a child, and spoke Fiumano (a Venetian dialect), Italian and Hungarian in the family home.

Rónai's father, Edoardo Tausz, was president of a Hungarian insurance agency, and her mother was Jolán Kápolnai. Her aunt Marta was a concert pianist. Rónai's parents had been born to Italo-Magyar Jewish families and her maternal grandfather was an observant Jew. Due to a family feud, her father converted to Catholicism.

After the Italian racial laws were passed in 1938, Rónai and her brother were forbidden from attending school. She had been in training to become a concert pianist. When Italy joined the Axis powers and entered World War II, Jewish men in Fiume were rounded up and her father and brother were sent to a detention camp in Torretta. Her family were stripped of their Italian citizenship, as the laws were based race, not religion. Rónai's mother appealed to a Catholic priest, who was able to free the Tausz men after two months. The Vatican had made 3,000 visas available for Jewish converts to Catholicism to emigrate to Brazil, so Rónai and her family fled to Rio de Janeiro in 1941, when she was aged 17. She became a Brazilian citizen.

== Life in Brazil ==
Rónai studied architecture at the Faculdade de Arquitetura e Urbanismo (FAU) [pt], part of the Federal University of Rio de Janeiro, from 1945 to 1950. She then worked as a professor of descriptive geometry in the Department of Analysis and Representation of Form from 1951 and 1979.

Rónai married philologist, translator and writer Paulo Rónai in civil ceremony in February 1952. She had designed one of the covers of his books. They had two daughters together, Cora Rónai and Laura Rónai. Her husband died in 1992, aged 85.

== Swimming ==
In the 1950s, Rónai was the Rio de Janeiro champion in diving. She featured on the cover of Seleções Esportivas magazine in January 1950.

After the death of her husband While in her 60s, Rónai took up swimming and was invited compete for Icaraí Regatta Club. She began competing internationally as a Masters swimmer in 1993, made her debut in the South American swimming championships in Belo Horizonte, Brazil, and made her World Championship debut in Montreal, Quebec, Canada, in 1994.

Rónai has won 13 gold medals and has broken both national and regional records for her age group in her swimming career. At the 2014 World Aquatics Masters Championships, she swam the 200m butterfly stroke in under nine minutes, setting a record and becoming the oldest swimmer to ever compete in the event. She trains four times a week.

== Awards ==
Rónai was named a BBC 100 Woman in 2017. She celebrated her 100th birthday in 2024.
