= Aurélio Buarque de Holanda Ferreira =

Brazilian writer (1910–1989)

Aurélio Buarque de Holanda
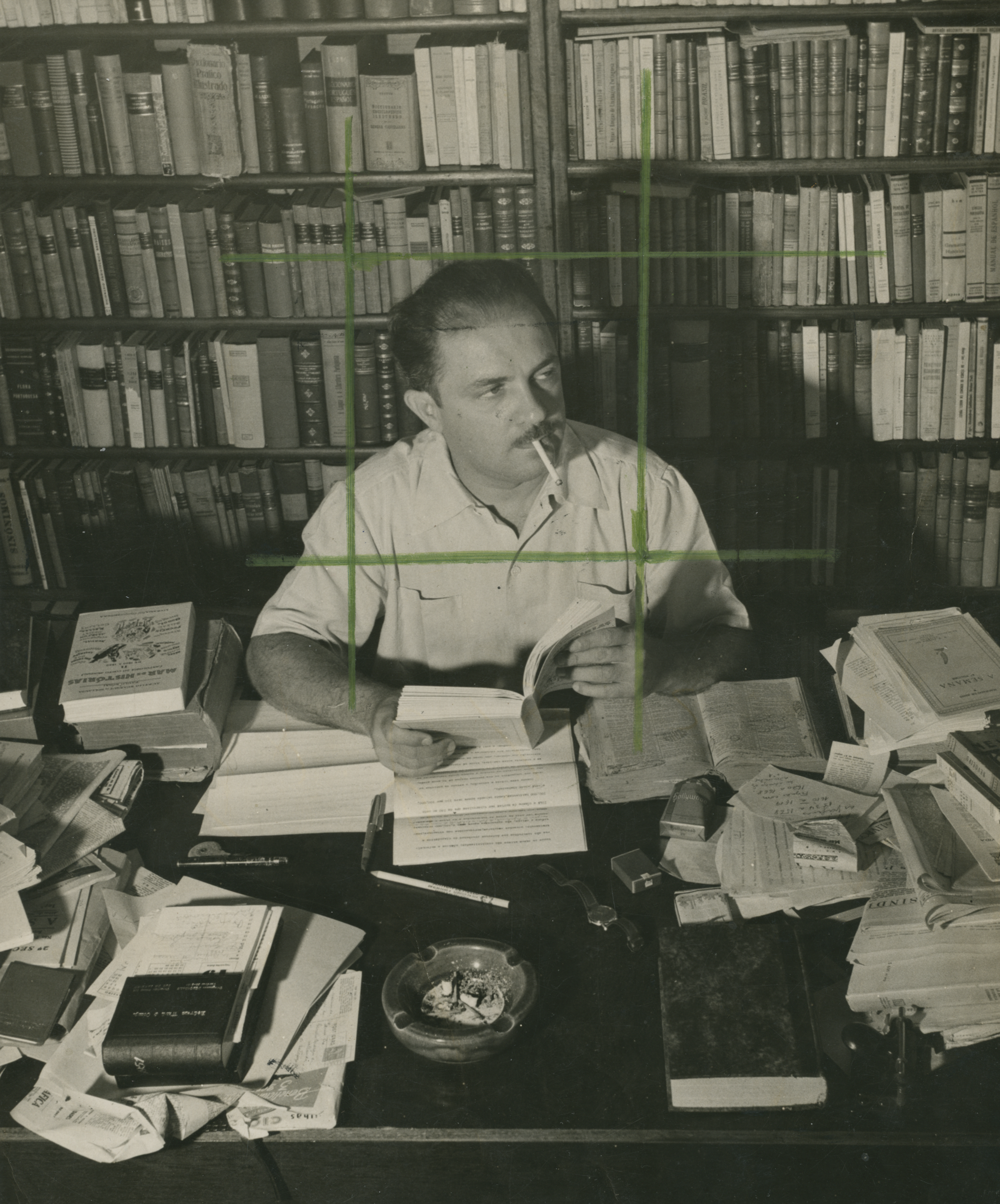
- Aurélio in 1956
- Born: May 3, 1910; Passo de Camaragibe, Brazil
- Died: February 28, 1989 (aged 78); Rio de Janeiro, Brazil
- Occupations: Lexicographer; Professor; Translator; Literary critic
- Notable work: Dois mundos (1942); Aurélio Dictionary (1975)

Signature
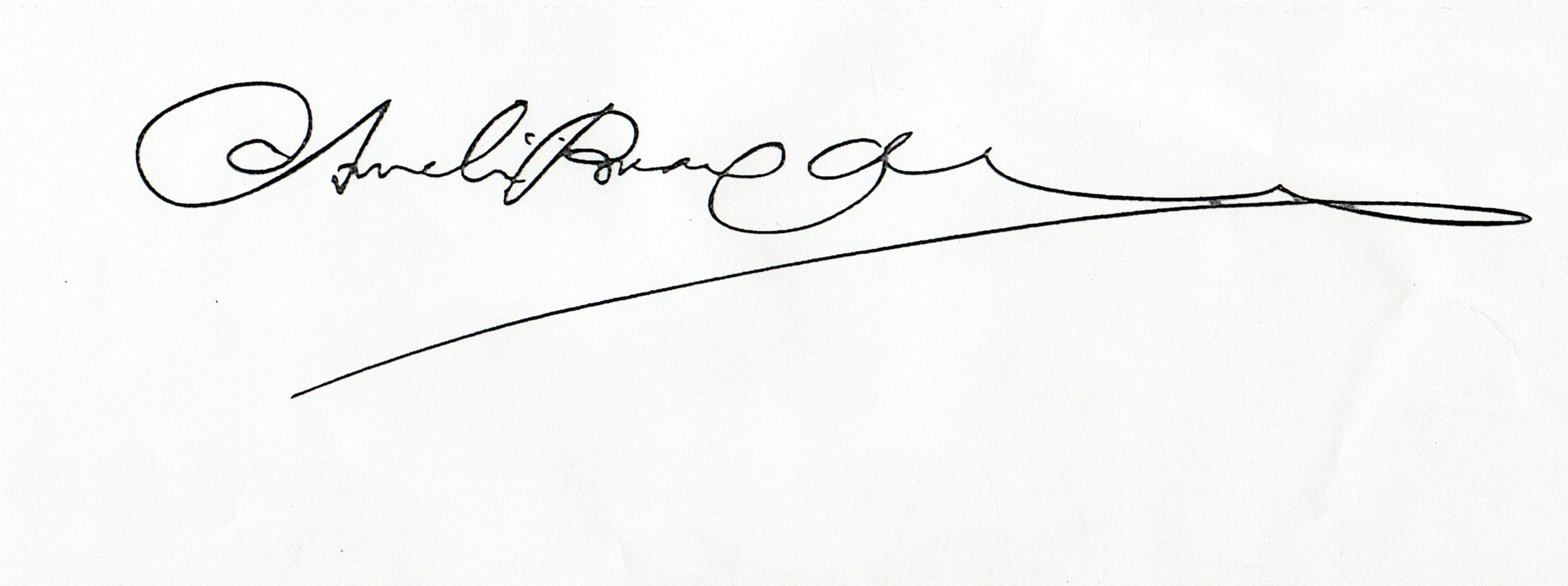

Aurélio Buarque de Holanda Ferreira (May 3, 1910 – February 28, 1989) was a Brazilian lexicographer, philologist, translator, and writer, best known for editing the Novo Dicionário da Língua Portuguesa, a major dictionary of the Portuguese language.

His family name was originally spelled Hollanda, but was changed to Holanda, presumably to follow the Portuguese spelling reform of 1943.

== Biography ==
Aurélio was born in Passo de Camaragibe, Alagoas state, Brazil. In 1923 he moved to the state capital Maceió, where, at only 14 years of age, he gave private lessons of Portuguese language. One year later he became a first-grade teacher at the local high school Ginásio Primeiro de Março.

In 1936 obtained a law degree at the Recife Law School in Pernambuco, and in that same year he started teaching French and Portuguese grammar, as well as Brazilian and Portuguese literature, at the Alagoas State High School in Maceió. In 1937–1938 he also served as director of the Maceió City Public Library.

In 1938 he moved to the city of Rio de Janeiro, where he taught Brazilian and Portuguese Literature at elite secondary schools including the public Pedro II High School and the private Anglo-American High School.

It was in Rio that he has started his career as a writer, by publishing articles, tales and chronicles in the local press. Between 1939 and 1943, he was acting secretary of the magazine Revista do Brasil.

Aurélio started his career as a lexicographer in 1941, as a collaborator of the Pequeno Dicionário da Língua Portuguesa. In 1942 he published a book of short stories, Dois Mundos ("Two Worlds"), which earned him a prize by the prestigious Brazilian Literary Academy.In 1943 he collaborated with the Dicionário Enciclopédico sponsored by the Brazilian Book Institute. In 1945 he took part in the First Brazilian Writers Conference in São Paulo. Between 1944 and 1949 he was a member of the Brazilian Writers Association (Rio de Janeiro branch).

In 1945 he married Marina Baird, with whom he had two children – Aurélio and Maria Luísa – and five grandchildren.

Between 1947 and 1960, Aurélio authored various texts for the Conto da Semana ("Weekly Tale") section of the newspaper Diário de Notícias. Starting in 1950 he also authored the column Enriqueça o Seu Vocabulário ("Enrich Your Vocabulary") for the Brazilian edition of Reader's Digest; these columns were later published as a book.

Between 1954 and 1955 he lectured Brazilian studies at the Universidad Nacional Autónoma de México, on a grant by the Brazilian Foreign Ministry.

He was elected a member of the Brazilian Literary Academy on May 4, 1961, and inaugurated on December 18, 1961, taking over seat number 30, formerly of Antônio Austregésilo.

Inspired by his love of the Portuguese language, he decided to produce his own dictionary. After several years of work, in 1975 he published the Novo Dicionário da Língua Portuguesa which was for many decades the reference lexicon in Brazil – to the point that Aurélio and Aurelião ("big Aurélio") became popular metonyms for the word "dictionary" (it is said that his collaborators once proposed to add that entry to the dictionary, but Aurélio vetoed it). This book went through dozens of reprints and revisions, and spawned several derivative editions.

Aurélio was also member of the Brazilian Academy of Philology, of the Pen Clube do Brasil (the Brazilian section of PEN international), the Comissão Nacional de Folclore, the Alagoas Literary Academy, the Alagoas Historical and Geographical Institute, and the Hispanic Society of America.

== Books ==
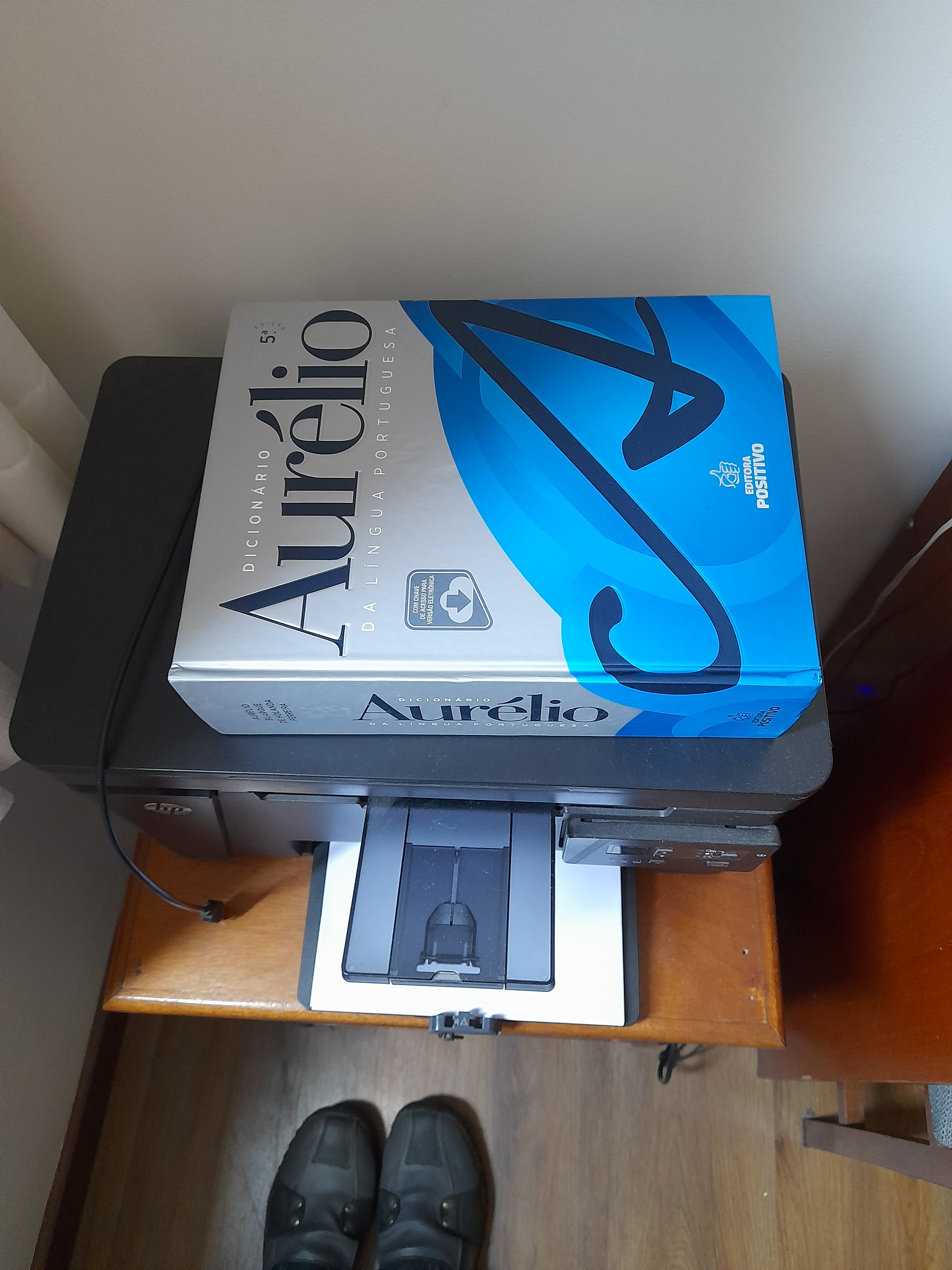

- Dois Mundos (1942).
- O Romance Brasileiro de 1752 a 1930, a survey of Brazilian novels (1952).
- Enriqueça o Seu Vocabulário, collected columns from Seleções do Reader's Digest (1958).
- Território Lírico, essays on poetry (1958).
- Vocabulário Ortográfico Brasileiro (1969).
- O Chapéu de Meu Pai, revised and condensed edition of Dois Mundos, (1974).
- Novo Dicionário da Língua Portuguesa, nicknamed "Aurelião" (1975).
- Minidicionário da Língua Portuguesa, nicknamed "Miniaurélio" (1977).
- Dicionário Aurélio Infantil da Língua Portuguesa, a children's dictionary, with illustrations by Ziraldo (1989).

== Articles and essays ==
- Linguagem e Estilo de Eça de Queirós, essay on Portuguese writer Eça de Queiroz; in Livro do Centenário de Eça de Queirós (1945).
- Enriqueça o Seu Vocabulário, monthly columns in Seleções do Reader's Digest (1950–1958).

== Translations and critical editions ==
- Mar de Histórias, with Paulo Rónai, an anthology of tales from the world's literature; volume I (1945), volume II (1951), volume III (1958), volume IV (1963), volume V (1981).
- Poemas de Amor, love poems by Amaru.
- Pequenos Poemas em Prosa, poems by Charles Baudelaire.
- Contos Gauchescos e Lendas do Sul, tales about Southern Brazil by Simões Lopes Neto (1949).
- Roteiro Literário do Brasil e de Portugal, with Álvaro Lins, an anthology of Portuguese-language literature (1956).
