= Cora Johnstone Best and Audrey Forfar Shippam =

American mountaineers

Cora Johnstone Best
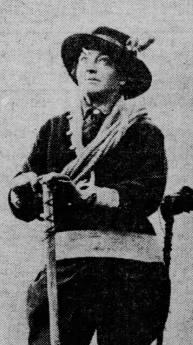
- Cora Johnstone Best in 1924
- Born: 1878
- Died: November 19, 1930 (aged 51–52)
- Occupation: Mountaineer, lecturer, medical doctor

Audrey Forfar Shippam
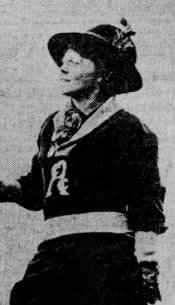
- Audrey Forfar Shippam in 1924
- Born: March 24, 1883
- Died: July 13, 1975 (aged 92)
- Occupation: Painter, printmaker, mountaineer, camera operator, filmmaker, photographer

Cora Johnstone Best (1878 – November 19, 1930) and Audrey Forfar Shippam (March 24, 1883 – July 13, 1975) were American mountaineers who summitted peaks in North America, Asia, and Europe. Both were members of the Alpine Club of Canada. During their trips together they became the first women to climb Mount Hungabee, traveled 200 hundred miles by canoe, and attempted to hunt snow leopards in China. In the 1920s, they had a film lecture series where Best described their exploits using slides that had been colored by Shippam. Separate from their adventures together, Dr. Best was a physician and Audrey Shippam was an artist.

== Early life ==
Cora Johnstone Best was born in Mantorville, Minnesota. Her mother taught her when she was young, but she continued her education in schools and with tutors up into college. Her first lesson was in visual education which she would later use in her work. She later became a medical doctor. Johnstone was first published for her book The Autobiography of a Cat at only seven years old. She and her husband, Dr. Robert Best, ran a private hospital in Minneapolis whose work included medical care for Native American children. Their home in Minneapolis, "Sundance Lodge", became a meeting place for outdoor enthusiasts, poets, and scientists. Best was a public speaker as early as 1918 and an advocate for physical education in schools.

Audrey Forfar Shippam was born on March 25, 1883. Little is known about her life aside from her exhibitions, but she was an artist who worked in sculpture, printmaking, and painting, often entering her work into exhibits, including the 1932 Fine Arts Exhibit at the Minnesota State Agricultural society in which she won third place for sculpture. She often went by "Belle" instead of Audrey and spent most of her life in Minnesota where she married her husband, Willis Shippam, a captain and instructor in the U.S. Artillery Corps, in 1911. Shippam worked as a painter and printmaker in Bulingame, California. She exhibited at the Golden Gate International Exposition in 1940. After Best's death there is little record of Shippam's life or work continuing. The video and slides Shippam had taken and used in lectures from the pair's expeditions are gone.

== Mountaineering ==
Best credited a postcard she saw as a child of an alpine lake for her interest in mountaineering. In 1920, she climbed Mount Assiniboine and joined the Alpine Club of Canada (ACC). In 1922, Best founded the Minneapolis chapter of the ACC and was the first female head of an ACC chapter, at a time when prejudice against women participating in mountaineering was high. Though Best and Shippam faced many challenges these women had many accomplishments. They were the first females to ascend many mountains, they completed first ascents for other peaks, and were the first women to lead expeditions on many summits.

It is not clear when Best met Shippam, but Shippam was a member of the ACC and they spent the next decade together summitting peaks on multiple continents, including a first ascent of Mount Iconoclast. They were also the first women to ascend Mount Hungabee.

In 1922, Best was hired as a public speaker by the Bureau of Commercial Economics (BCE), a non-profit film distribution organization. Best spoke about the pair's mountaineering adventures and Shippam produced film and hand-colored lantern slides to accompany Best's lectures. The series of film lectures included "Hell Roaring Waters", about a 200 miles (320 km) canoe trip down the Columbia River, "Kingdom of the Clouds,"about reaching the summit of Mount Pope, and "Unblazed Trails and Shining Peaks," about the Canadian Rockies.

In 1927, Best and Shippam embarked on an adventure in Manchuria at the start of the Chinese Civil War. They intended to head for the Khingan Mountains and hunt a snow leopard, but negative attention from Chinese troops prompted them to disguise themselves as East Indians by darkening their faces with chrome yellow. They had their food stolen, engaged in a gunfight with bandits, and Best came down with dysentery before both made it to Port Arthur. They then travelled to Japan and climbed the Karasawa Ridge, Mount Fuji, and Mount Aso.

Best passed away in Minneapolis in 1930 following a lung infection that she had developed during a climb in Switzerland.

Best was given lifetime memberships in the American, Canadian, Japanese, British, and Swiss Alpine Clubs. This was due to the number of achievements Best had received and impact she had on the mountaineering community. Because of the impacts Best had on the sport she was given special privileges to explore national parks in the United States and Canada.

== Advocacy ==
Cora Johnstone Best taught lectures in the offseason of mountain climbing in the later years of her life. She forgo her medical career to pursue this passion full time. These lectures were taught for free in hopes to increase public health by nature. Her motto when discussing public health and trying to stop obesity was "the longer the belt, the shorter the life". Best liked to share her achievements and the trills of being an adventurer with everyone she could. This led her to perform these lectures in all sorts of places including churches, high schools, universities, hotels, and more. The subject matter of the lectures were exploits from her accents and journeys, using slides and videos of her and Shippam's travels. During this time Best would contribute to the Bureau of Commercial Economics. She became a representative of the BCE due to the videographic work done by the women on these expeditions which were used to promote conservation. With the conservation of parks Best also made a stand for equal access to parks for all people.

Best and Shippam were some of the founding member of the Trail Riders of Canadian Rockies in which advocation of equal rights was a principle in which they made decisions by. The Trail Riders club were an influential group of people from many walks of life including cowboys, poets, artists, and intellectuals. They both served in leadership roles while a part of this club. Logging over 2,500 miles with this group, they became the first to paddle the 200 miles of the Big Bend, an area of white water on the Columbia River in Canada. The principles of equality were shown by not having biases towards accepting any person into the club for any reason including: race, color, age, or profession. Best continued to show her commitment to these principles in her work and life. Best was an advocate for including Japanese mountaineers in the ACC during a time in which this group faced heavy discrimination.

During her mountaineering the sport was male dominated. When climbing there was pressure on her about being a woman mountaineer. Through this she continued to be a voice for women in the sport and proudly embraced her femininity. This also went against social norms in a public way. She did this by rebutting reporter questions about her husbands control over her. Best also publicly stated that women can experience and complete the same things that men can. Some examples of challenges the women faced during these times includes female names being left off of expedition lists and views of women being disciplined for wearing mountaineering pants.
