= Aurélio Dictionary =

Portuguese dictionary

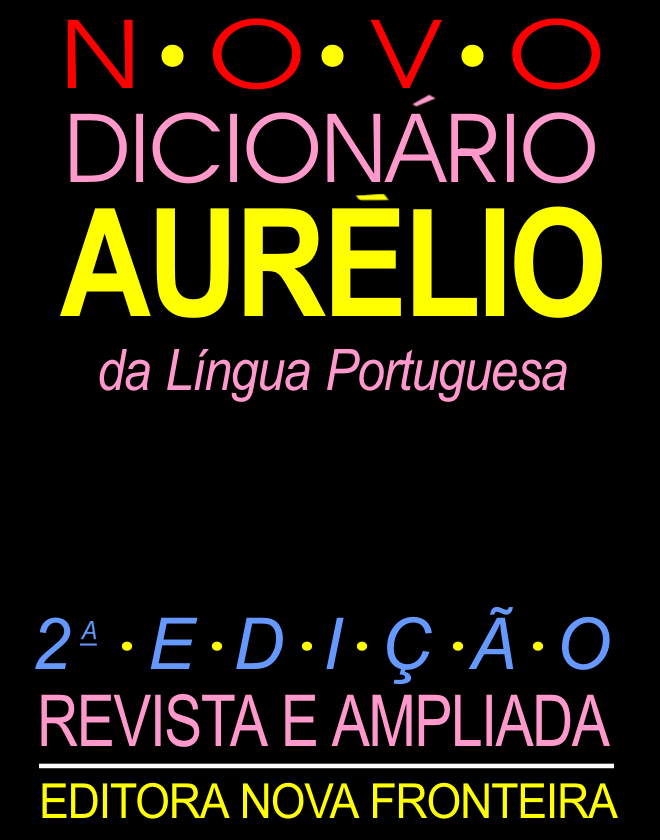
Cover, 2nd edition, 1993.

The Novo Dicionário da Língua Portuguesa is a comprehensive dictionary of the Portuguese language, published in Brazil, first compiled by Aurélio Buarque de Holanda Ferreira. It is popularly known as the Dicionário Aurélio, or simply Aurélio or Aurelião ("Big Aurélio"').

The first edition was published in 1975, and it has since then re-printed dozens of times, and also published in electronic form. According to publisher's data, it had sold over 5 million copies by 1986, and over 40 million by 2005 (counting all derivative works and special editions). The 4th edition published in 2009 is written in the new orthography (o Novo Acordo da Língua Portuguesa de 7 de maio de 2008), ISBN 978-85-385-2824-1 (with CD).

== Publication history ==
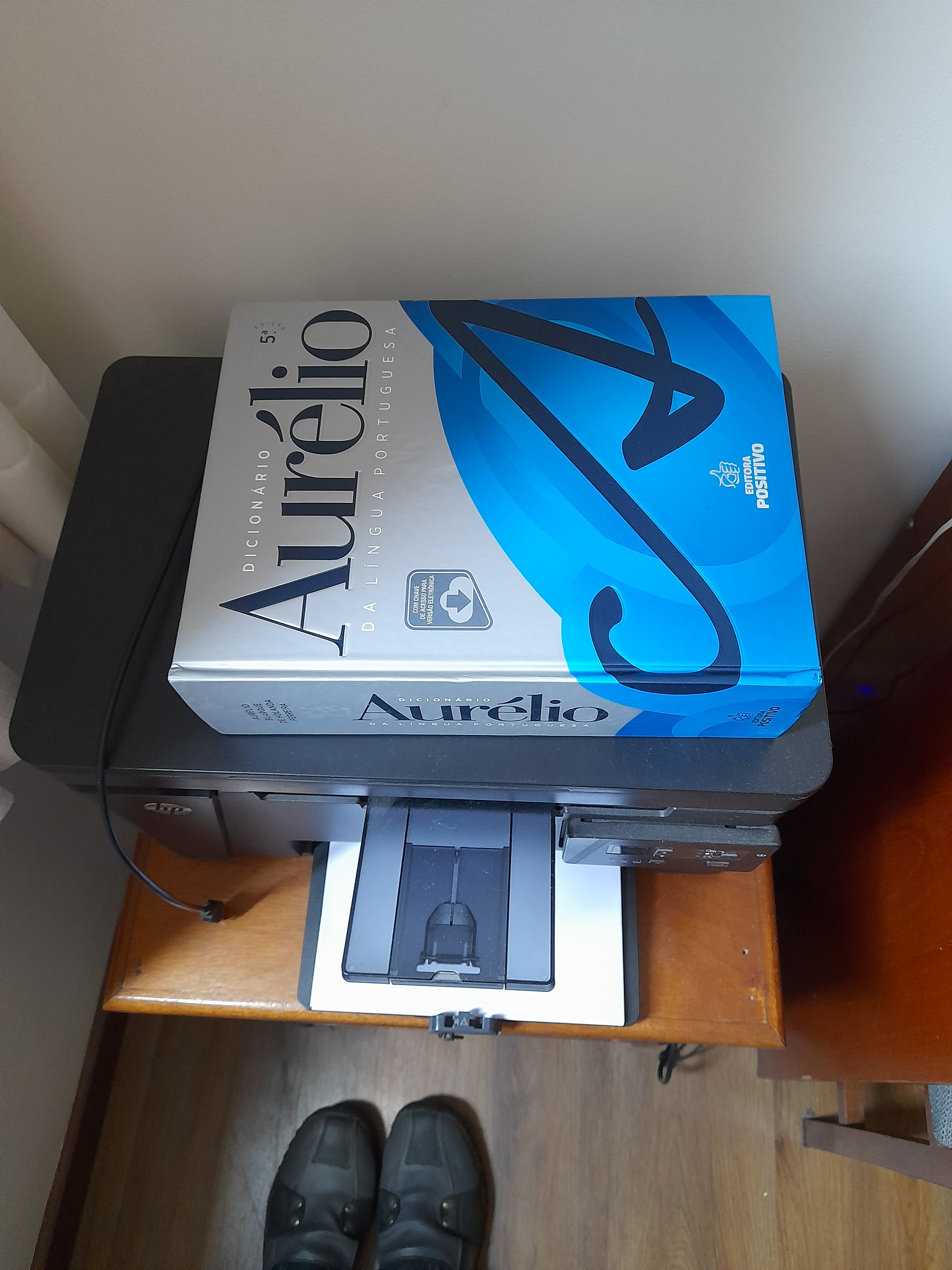
Dicionário Aurélio.

The second edition (copyright date 1986; 32nd reprinting, 1995) has 1809 pages plus front matter and bibliography, and was published by Editora Nova Fronteira. This edition was organized by Margarida dos Anjos, Marina Baird Ferreira (Aurélio's widow), Elza Tavares Ferreira, Joaquim Campelo Marques, Stella Rodrigo Octávio Moutinho, and Giovani Mafra e Silva.

A third edition, Dicionário Aurélio Século XXI, was published in 2001.

In 2004 a new publisher (Positivo) acquired the rights to distribute the dictionary with the title Novo Dicionário Aurélio da Língua Portuguesa, with 435,000 entries.
