= Cora Ann Pair Thomas =

Liberian Baptist missionary

- Born: Cora Ann Pair; September 8, 1875; Knightdale, North Carolina
- Died: May 10, 1952 (aged 76); Brewerville, Liberia
- Education: Shaw University, Fisk University
- Occupation: Missionary
- Spouse: William Henry Thomas (m. 1908; died in 1942)

Cora Ann Pair Thomas (1875–1952) was a Baptist missionary, serving in Liberia from 1909 until her death in 1952. She is the grandmother of playwright and author Cori Thomas and the mother of former Liberian Ambassador David M. Thomas Cori’s father.

== Biography ==
Thomas née Pair was born in Knightdale, North Carolina, on September 8, 1875.

She graduated from Shaw University in 1895. She then worked as a principal of an orphanage in Oxford, North Carolina, until she entered Fisk University in 1904, where she received missionary training.

In 1908 she married Reverend William Henry Thomas (1881-1942). The same year the couple traveled Brewerville, Liberia under the auspices of the Lott Carey Convention (LCC). While William supervised the Brewerville mission Cora taught at the Lott Carey Mission School. William became a Liberian citizen while Cora retain her American citizenship. The couple worked together for 33 years, until William's death in 1942. After the death of her husband, Cora took over as the superintendent of the Brewerville mission. In 1946 she left Liberia due to poor health, returning in 1951 with a pilgrimage group.

Thomas died of malaria on May 10, 1952, in Brewerville, Liberia.
