= Coras =

Coras may refer to:

== People ==
- Jean de Coras (1515–1572), French jurist
- Jacques de Coras (1630–1677), French poet
- Marcel Coraş (born 1959), Romanian footballer

== Biology ==
- Coras (spider), a genus of spiders

== Other ==
- The Cora people, a native people of Mexico; see also:
  - Cora language
  - Misión Santiago de Los Coras
- Coras F.C., a Mexican association football club based in Tepic, Nayarit, Mexico
- Coras F.C. B, the official reserve team of Coras F.C.
- Córas na Poblachta, a minor Irish political party founded in 1940
- Córas Iompair Éireann, a public transport authority in Ireland
