= Paul Kneale =

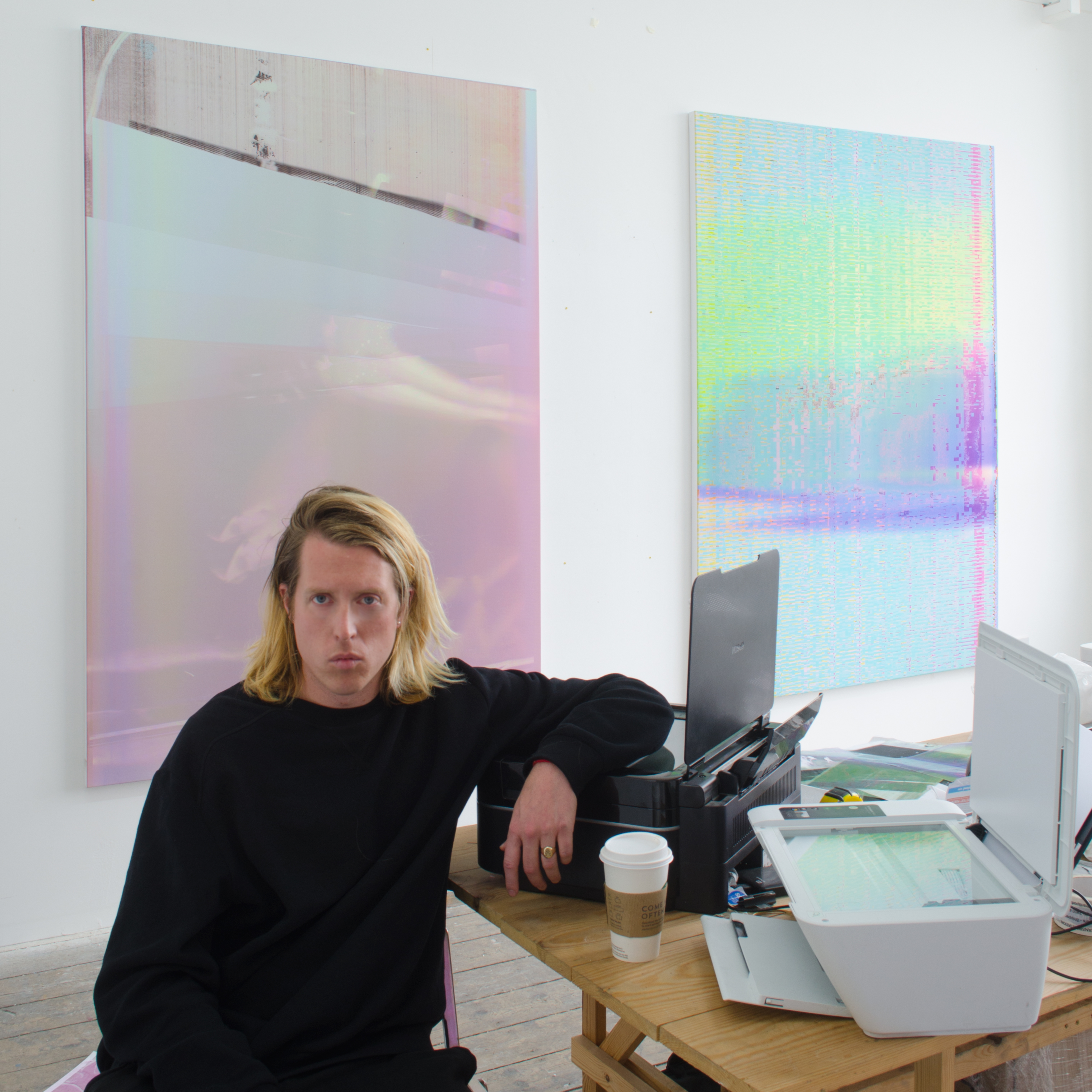
Paul Kneale in his studio

Paul Kneale (born 1986 in Toronto, Ontario) is a London based artist whose practice explores the impact of digital technology on the world's perception of reality and art.

His works have been included in the Moscow International Biennale for Young Art 2016 and are part of private collections such as the Rubell Family Collection and the Collezione Sandretto Re Rebaudengo. He has been working with ARTUNER since 2015.

He has taught at the Zurich University of Art and has contributed theoretical articles to Frieze and Spike magazines. Kneale is also the author of the short story Ex Oriente Lux and of the eBook New Abject, a response to Julia Kristeva's 1980 text 'Powers of Horror: An Essay on Abjection'. He has collaborated with fashion brands including Nicholas Kirkwood and Versace. In 2020, the CBC exposed an ongoing conceptual project where he circulated highly realistic digital renderings of his paintings in collector's homes to unsuspecting interior decor accounts on Instagram.

== Education ==
Paul Kneale obtained a BA in Visual Studies and Art History from University of Toronto. He then moved to the United Kingdom and received his MFA from the Slade School of Fine Art (London) in 2011.

== Work ==
The significance of Paul Kneale's production resides as much in the process of creation as well as it does in the final result. His so-called 'scanner paintings' are emblematic of the artist's practice. Resulting from productively misusing copying machines, Kneale's works are obtained by making low and high-resolution scans with nothing placed on the copy-bed in order to capture the twinkle of neon light, atmospheric conditions and the trembling light of the studio by keeping the machine's lid open. Finally, the resulting file is printed on canvas, where this otherwise obscure microcosm is transposed through the visual lexicon of the digital, which can assume the form of acidic colours, evocative shapes and oblique stripes. The final goal of his scanner paintings is to crystallise – through the gaze of the digital – immaterial entities such as space and time, which we all inhabit but that often elude human perception. To do that, Paul Kneale often creates what he defines as a 'time sandwich': a technique consisting in the overlapping of a fast, low-resolution scan over a slow high resolution one. This way, not only several moments in time co-exist and are captured on the same surface, but also two distinct ways of 'stretching' time are recorded on the same work.

Kneale also uses everyday objects to address metaphysical questions and ideas. In the ongoing sculptural series 'Event Horizon' Paul Kneale employs found objects – thus expanding on the tradition of the readymade – and glass-encased neon components. The title 'Event Horizon' of the original work in the series is a reference to the edge of a black hole, the place from which no light escapes, and thus also where time stops. Here, trash cans, satellite dishes and surveillance mirrors are transformed into contemporary deities by being surrounded by an incandescent halo. The neons themselves are a small simulacrum of the cosmic. They are made using some of the noble gases, such as neon and argon. These gases are contained in glass tubes, and the illumination is activated by high voltage electricity passing through them. However, in sharp contrast with their divinised nature, they also represent objects of transition; transition from using to disposing, from satellite waves to pixels and from reality to distorted records of it. Kneale is interested in the relationship between these abstract, sometimes cosmic theories which exist as ideas, and the scale of the body that both encounters and contemplates things in the world. This series has been developing across several exhibitions and has recently been shown at Palazzo Capris Torino, Moscow Biennale, Rubell Family Collection Miami, Cassina Projects NYC, and Thetis Gardens in the Arsenale Novissimo during the Venice Biennale in 2017. In spring 2018, Kneale had his first solo show Compression in Brussels, which was featured in the Financial Times How to Spend It. In Autumn, his works will be exhibited in Peindre la Nuit, a show taking place at the Centre Pompidou Metz.

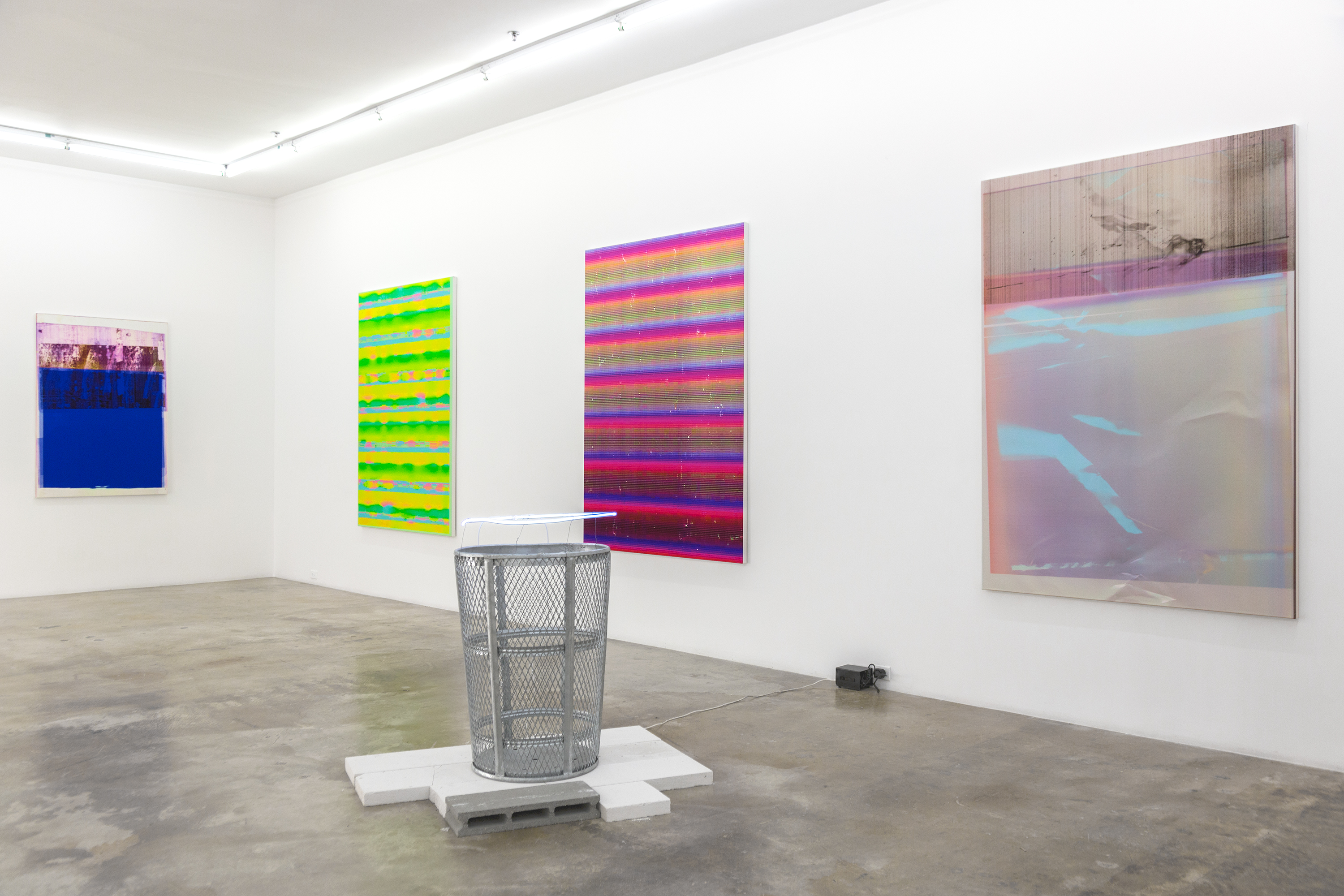
Paul Kneale's room at 'High Anxiety: New Acquisitions', Rubell Foundation, November 2016- August 2017.

In an interview for Spike, Paul Kneale surprisingly states that digital photography is more akin to traditional painting than to analogue photography. Indeed, while analogue photography is generated by a physical trace left by light on the photographic film (index), digital photography is the result of a process of elaboration and interpretation of the objects of reality, as it happens in traditional painting. Indeed, digital photography – and therefore, by extension, Paul Kneale's scanner paintings – and traditional painting are not a mechanical representation of the elements of reality, but an elaborated reinterpretation of them, mediated in the latter case by the gaze of the human eye and in the former by digital devices which have been programmed according to certain standards by their manufacturers, and subsequently are freely manipulated by the artist.

== Selected exhibitions ==
- Crossing the Borders of Photography, Somerset House, London, 2019
- Peindre la Nuit, Centre Pompidou Metz, October 2018
- Compression, Brussels, 2018
- CONTEMPORARY PHOTOGRAPHY FORUM, Boca Raton Museum, Florida, 2018
- Painting or not, Kaviar Factory, Norway, 2017
- COMMAND-ALTERNATIVE-ESCAPE, Thetis Gardens Arsenale Novissimo, Venice, 2017
- After Image: Toby Ziegler & Paul Kneale, curated by ARTUNER at Cassina Projects, New York, 2017
- High Anxiety: New Acquisitions, Rubell Family Collection, Miami, 2016
- Project 1049, Gstaad, Switzerland, 2016
- Moscow International Biennale for Young Art 2016, Moscow, Russia, 2016
- Michael Armitage, Paul Kneale, Tabor Robak, ARTUNER, Palazzo Capris, Turin, 2015
- Spotlight: Paul Kneale, ARTUNER, 2015
- Studioscape: South London, ARTUNER, London, 2015
- Abjects, Import Projects, Berlin, 2015
- 4 or 5 self-portraits for free-form natural language descriptions of image regions, Evelyn Yard, London, 2015
- /b/random, Art Gallery of Ontario, 2014
- Monet's Garden Zuckerberg's Firewall, Andor Gallery, London, 2014
- SEO & Co., Tank TV, London, 2014
- Pleasure Principles, Fondation Galeries Lafayette, Paris, 2014
- Poetry and Dream, PLAZAPLAZA, London, 2012

== Charity and events ==
Paul Kneale donated the scanner painting "I Job My Love" (2017) to the 2017 Leonardo DiCaprio Foundation Gala Auction, which supports organizations fighting global warming and climate change.

== See also ==
- Jon Rafman
- Henry Hudson (artist)
- Nimrod Kamer
- Gerhard Richter
