= Cora Daniels =

African-American author

Cora Daniels is an African-American author who has written on issues of African-American culture. She is now teaching writing and reporting at New York University's Arthur L. Carter Journalism Institute.

== Books ==
- Black Power Inc.
- Ghettonation: A Journey into the Land of the Bling and The Home of the Shameless.
