= Cora LeEthel Christian =

Medical administrator

Cora LeEthel Christian was the first native woman of the U.S. Virgin Islands to earn a medical degree, and is a medical administrator in the U.S Virgin Islands.

== Early life and medical training ==
Christian was born on Saint Thomas in the U.S. Virgin Islands, and graduated first in her high school class.

Christian earned her medical degree from Jefferson Medical College in 1971, where she was the first African-American female graduate. After her degree, she completed a residency in Family Practice at Howard University Medical Center and her Master’s in Public Health at Johns Hopkins University.

== Career ==
After completing her medical education Christian returned to the Virgin Islands, working as an emergency room doctor in Frederiksted, St. Croix. In 1977 she was appointed Assistant Commissioner of Health for the Virgin Islands, which office she held for the following 15 years. In 1977 she also founded the Virgin Islands Medical Institute (VIMI), the Quality Improvement Organization for Medicare hospitals in the U.S. Virgin Islands.

Christian became the Medical Director of the petroleum refinery Hovensa in 1991 and was its Chief Medical Consultant until the company's closure in 2012.

Christian received the American Academy of Family Physicians Humanitarian Award in 2013, served on the National Board of the AARP, and was recognized by U.S. Virgin Islands' Delegate to the U.S. House of Representatives Donna Christian-Christensen on the floor of the 113th U.S. Congress.
