= Cora Rónai =

Brazilian writer, journalist and photographer

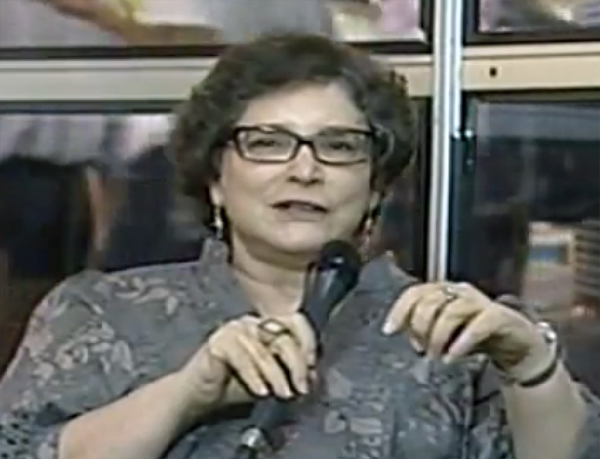
- Cora Rónai in 2012
- Born: Cora Tausz Rónai; July 31, 1953 (age 72); Rio de Janeiro, Brazil
- Occupations: journalist, writer, photographer
- Partner: Millôr Fernandes
- Parents: Paulo Rónai (father); Nora Tausz Rónai (mother)

Cora Tausz Rónai (born 31 July 1953) is a Brazilian writer, journalist and photographer.

== Biography ==
Cora Rónai was born in Rio de Janeiro, daughter of Hungarian-born writer Paulo Rónai and architect and swimmer Nora Tausz Rónai. She started her career as a journalist in Brasília, working for Jornal de Brasília, Correio Braziliense and as correspondent for Folha de S.Paulo and Jornal do Brasil in the Brazilian capital.

In 1980, she returned to Rio de Janeiro. In 1982, she left Jornal do Brasil, where she would return to later, to focus on writing for theater and children's literature.

An early adopter of computers, Rónai wrote the first column about personal computing in a Brazilian newspaper in 1987, in Jornal do Brasil. She also was the first Brazilian journalist to have a blog, internETC.

In 2006, she published the book Fala Foto, made entirely of photographs taken with cellphones. It was shortlisted for Prêmio Jabuti.

Rónai writes for O Globo since 1991, where she wrote the "Info etc". section until 2008. Currently, she writes in the "Tecnologia" section, and also in "Segundo Caderno" (O Globo's arts and culture section). She is also an animals' rights activist.

== Awards ==
She was awarded the Prêmio Comunique-se Best Technology Writer in 2004, 2006, and 2008.

== Books published ==
- Álbum de Retratos: Walter Firmo (Mauad)
- Uma Ilha lá Longe (Record)
- Caiu na Rede (Agir)
- Fala Foto (Senac Rio)
- Um História de Videogame (Record)
- Há milhões de Anos Atrás (Globo)
- Cabeça Feita Pé Quebrado (Globo)
- A Princesa e a Abóbora (Globo)
- Sapomorfose (Salamandra)
- Idéias: um Livro de Entrevistas (UnB)
- O Barbeiro de Sevilha e as Bodas de Fígaro (Ediouro) com Paulo Rónai
- O Terceiro Tigre (Nova Fronteira)

== Personal life ==
Rónai lived with writer Millôr Fernandes until his death in 2012.
