= Cora Skinner =

American glamour model and actress (born 1985)

- Born: June 18, 1985 (age 41); Alexandria, Virginia, U.S.
- Occupations: Model, Actress
- Modeling information
- Height: 5 ft 9 in (1.75 m)
- Hair color: Brunette
- Eye color: Hazel
- Agency: NEXT Model Management

Cora Skinner (born June 18, 1985) is an American glamour model and actress.

== Early life and beginnings ==
Cora Skinner was born in Alexandria, Virginia and grew up in Creston, California. She was a tomboy while growing up at a 70-acre ranch. As a child, she was involved in dance, track and field, gymnastics, diving and cheerleading. She became interested with modelling when her sister was studying to be a fashion designer. While attending California State University, Long Beach, she began pursuing modelling. She competed in an international swimsuit competition and won Top Ten title. Afterwards, she signed with an agency and began pursuing modeling full-time.

== Career ==
=== Print ===
Skinner has appeared in pictorials and features in Maxim USA, Maxim in Spain, FHM (USA), Maxim Belgium, Muscle & Fitness, and Playboy's lingerie catalog. Skinner has been featured on her own set of Bench Warmer model trading cards. "These cards, which have also featured Pamela Anderson, Traci Bingham and even actress Charisma Carpenter, are traded just like baseball cards." Skinner debuted on the model trading cards in 2006. She was brought back in 2007 for the Gold Card series of the model trading cards. Skinner has been featured on the magazine cover photo of Hot Bike and Import Tuner.

=== Television ===
Year	Title	Role	Other notes
2006	The Office (episode: "The Secret")	Waitress	(Series)
2006	CSI: Miami (episode: "Driven")	Spa Patron	(Series)
2007	Shark (episode: "Eye of the Beholder")	Model	(Series)
2006–2007	Las Vegas	Becky / Delores	(Series)
2008	2008 Scream Awards	Intro Skit	(Movie)
2008–2009	The Tonight Show with Jay Leno	Axe Skit / Dancer / Jaywalker	(Series)
2009	Rules of Engagement (episode: "Jeff's New Friend")	Workout Girl	(Series)
