= Cora Seton =

American novelist

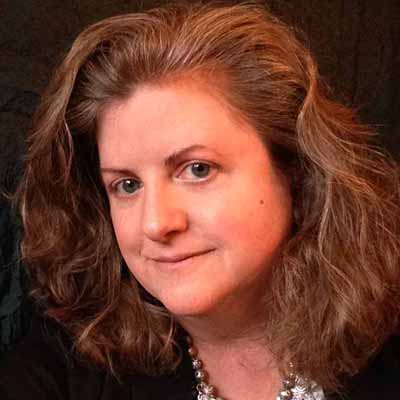
- Born: February 13, 1969 (age 56)
- Occupation: Author
- Genres: Contemporary Romance

Website
- www.coraseton.com

Cora Seton (born February 13, 1969) is a New York Times and USA Today bestselling author of contemporary romance novels. Her books have regularly ranked as iBooks bestsellers, and her book The Soldier's E-Mail Order Bride was one of Draft2Digital's bestselling self-published ebooks of 2014. Seton's Issued to the Bride One Sniper was one of BookBub's most highly rated books of 2017.

== Selected works ==
The Cowboys of Chance Creek series

- The Cowboy Inherits a Bride (March 2015)
- The Cowboy's E-Mail Order Bride (April 2013)
- The Cowboy Wins a Bride (May 2013)
- The Cowboy Imports a Bride (September 2013)
- The Cowgirl Ropes a Billionaire (November 2013)
- The Sheriff Catches a Bride (January 2014)
- The Cowboy Lassos a Bride (February 2014)
- The Cowboy Rescues a Bride (May 2014)
- The Cowboy Earns a Bride (October 2014)
- The Cowboy's Christmas Bride (November 2015)

The Heroes of Chance Creek series

- The Navy SEAL's E-Mail Order Bride (April 2014)
- The Soldier's E-Mail Order Bride (July 2014)
- The Marine's E-Mail Order Bride (October 2014)
- The Navy SEAL's Christmas Bride (December 2014)
- The Airman's E-Mail Order Bride (June 2015)
- A SEAL's Chance (August 2015)

The SEALs of Chance Creek series

- A SEAL's Oath (January 2016)
- A SEAL's Vow (June 2016)
- A SEAL's Pledge (October 2016)
- A SEAL's Consent (February 2017)
- A SEAL's Purpose (January 2018)
- A SEAL's Resolve (May 2018)

The Brides of Chance Creek

- Issued to the Bride: One Navy SEAL (November 2016)
- Issued to the Bride: One Airman (April 2017)
- Issued to the Bride: One Sniper (June 2017)
- Issued to the Bride: One Marine (November 2017)

Turners vs Coopers

- The Cowboy's Secret Bride (February 2018)
- The Cowboy's Outlaw Bride (April 2018)

Standalone Novels

- After the Fire (September 2015)
- Dare Me Again (June 2015)
