= Cora Sutton Castle =

Psychologist and feminist

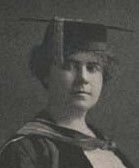
- Born: Cora Olive Sutton; May 10, 1880; Prior Lake, Minnesota
- Died: August 14, 1966 (aged 86)
- Occupations: Sociologist; clubwoman

Academic background
- Education: Columbia University; University of California; University of Minnesota
- Thesis: A Statistical Study of Eminent Women (1913)
- Doctoral advisor: James McKeen Cattell

Cora Olive Sutton Castle (May 10, 1880 – August 14, 1966) was an American educator, sociologist, author, and clubwoman based in San Francisco, California.

== Early life and education ==
Cora Olive Sutton was born in Prior Lake, Minnesota, the daughter of Andrew Stewart Sutton and Harriet Snow Sutton. She earned a bachelor's degree at the University of Minnesota in 1905, and a master's degree in literature at the University of California.

== A Statistical Study of Eminent Women and other work ==
Cora Sutton Castle earned her doctorate in the psychology department at Columbia University in 1913, with a dissertation titled A Statistical Study of Eminent Women, the title a direct reference to her advisor James McKeen Cattell's paper, "A Statistical Study of Eminent Men" (1903). In her version of the study, she asked, "Has innate inferiority been the reason for the small number of eminent women, or has civilization never yet allowed them an opportunity to develop their innate powers and possibilities?" Her dissertation was published as a book the next year, and is still read and cited as an early example of collective biography of women.

In 1916, six local organizations formed the San Francisco City and County Federation of Women's Club.

Castle served as president of the San Francisco City Federation of Women's Clubs from 1918 to 1920, and in that role helped establish the "New Outside Inn," to host visiting family members of servicemen being treated at the Letterman Army Hospital.

Castle survived a fatal shipwreck in China in 1926, while traveling.

== Works ==
- A Statistical Study of Eminent Women (Ph.D. dissertation, Columbia University, 1913).
- A statistical study of eminent women. New York: The Science Press. 1913.
- A Statistical Study of Eminent Women Volume 82 June 1913 Popular Science Monthly
- A Statistical Study of Eminent Women. (1913). Archives of Psychology, 4(No. 27), 90.

== Personal life ==
Cora Sutton married Harry Edward Castle, a surgeon, in 1910. They lived in the Fairmont Hotel in San Francisco for many years, while he served as the hotel doctor. Cora Sutton Castle was widowed in 1949 and died from cancer in 1966, aged 86 years.
