= Cora Sternberg =

American medical oncologist

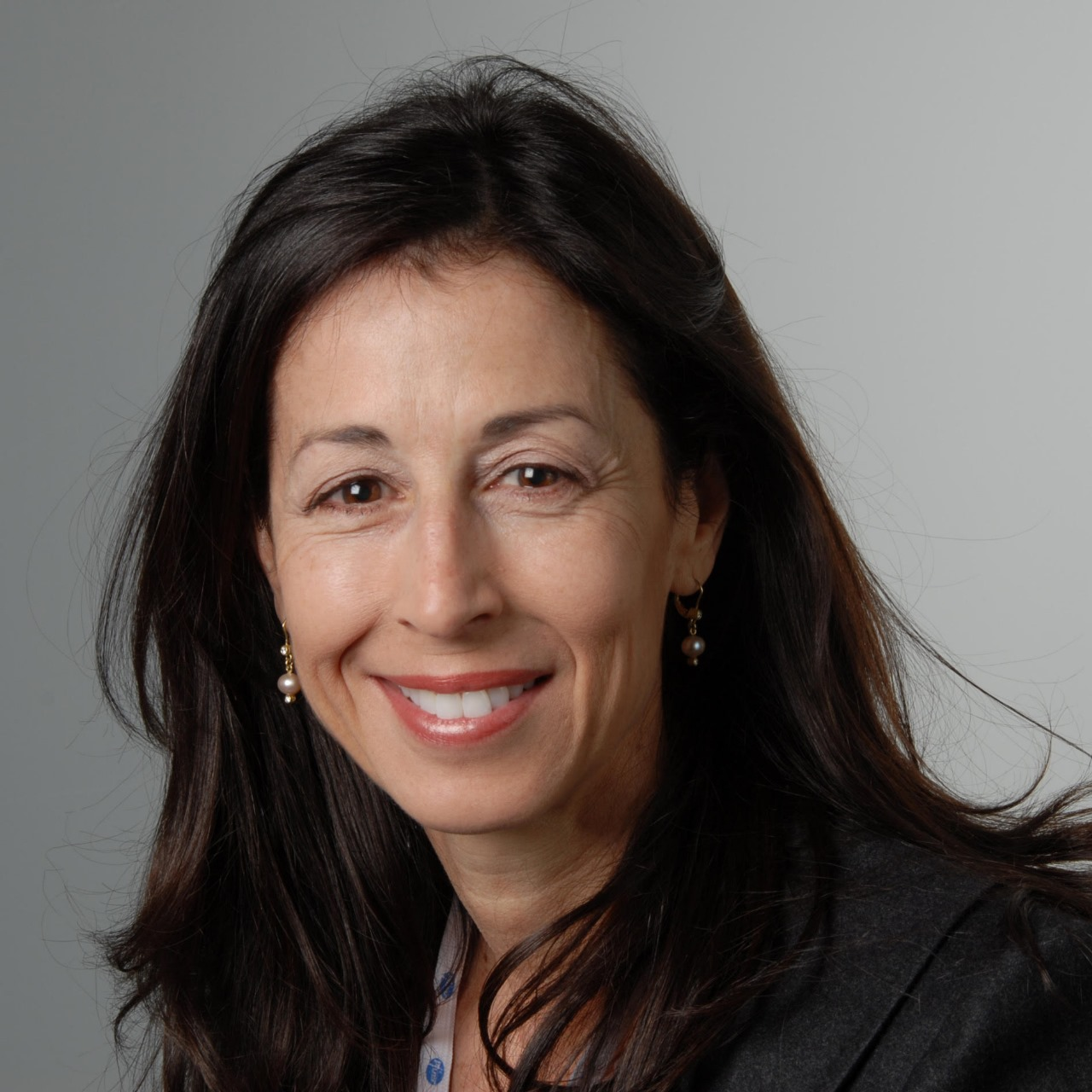
- Born: Philadelphia, Pennsylvania
- Education: University of Pennsylvania; Sapienza University of Rome
- Awards: Order of Merit of the Italian Republic & others
- Scientific career
- Fields: Oncology
- Workplaces: Weill Cornell Medicine

Cora N. Sternberg is an American medical oncologist and academic physician specializing in genitourinary cancers. She is Professor of Medicine in the Division of Hematology and Medical Oncology at Weill Cornell Medicine and serves as Clinical Director of the Englander Institute for Precision Medicine at NewYork–Presbyterian Hospital. She has been included in Stanford–Elsevier's list of the top 2% of most-cited scientists worldwide and is a recognized expert on Doximity.

== Early life and education ==
Sternberg was born in Philadelphia, Pennsylvania. She earned her B.A. summa cum laude from the University of Pennsylvania and her M.D. from the same institution. She completed her internal medicine residency at Mount Sinai Medical Center and fellowships in medical oncology and hematology at Memorial Sloan Kettering Cancer Center, in New York. She later obtained a second medical degree (summa cum laude) from the University of Rome La Sapienza.

== Career ==
After early academic and clinical roles at Stanford University, Cornell University Medical College, and Memorial Sloan Kettering, Sternberg moved to Italy, where she was appointed Chief of Medical Oncology at San Camillo–Forlanini Hospital in Rome in 2002, a position she held until 2018. During this time, she also served as adjunct professor of oncology at La Sapienza University and maintained active roles in international oncology organizations.

In November 2018, she joined Weill Cornell Medicine as Clinical Director of the Englander Institute for Precision Medicine (EIPM), where she has helped develop and implement multiomic tumor profiling, AI-enhanced diagnostics, and personalized cancer therapy strategies. She is an attending physician at NewYork–Presbyterian and liaison to the Meyer Cancer Center.

In 2004, Sternberg founded the Samuel and Barbara Sternberg Cancer Research Foundation (ONLUS, now ETS), named after her parents, to support cancer research and promote precision oncology in Italy.

== Research and clinical contributions ==
Sternberg is recognized for her work in clinical trials and drug development across genitourinary malignancies. She has authored over 400 peer-reviewed articles (more than 100 as first author), contributed to over 80 book chapters, and co-edited or guest-edited six oncology textbooks. She currently serves in editorial roles as:

- Section Editor, Urologic Oncology
- Associate Editor, Bladder Cancer Clinical Trials Corner
- Genitourinary Editor, ESMO Open – Cancer Horizons
- Associate Editor, Frontiers in Oncology

She has also served on editorial boards for Critical Reviews in Hematology & Oncology, British Journal of Urology, European Journal of Cancer, and European Urology Oncology.

=== Bladder cancer ===
She developed the M-VAC and dose-dense M-VAC chemotherapy regimens for urothelial carcinoma. As principal investigator for the EORTC 30994 study, she demonstrated the efficacy of adjuvant chemotherapy following cystectomy. She also led the SAUL trial of atezolizumab and participated in the landmark JAVELIN Bladder 100 trial, which led to approval of avelumab as maintenance therapy in advanced bladder cancer.

=== Prostate cancer ===
Sternberg helped lead the AFFIRM and PROSPER trials of enzalutamide and played a critical role in the development of abiraterone acetate. Her work contributed directly to FDA and EMA approvals of these agents for castration-resistant prostate cancer. She was also involved in developing and assessing satraplatin, tasquinimod, and darolutamide, and has studied androgen receptor resistance mechanisms and lineage plasticity through translational research at Weill Cornell.

=== Renal cell carcinoma ===
She served as a principal investigator in studies of pazopanib, including the pivotal registration trial and the subsequent COMPARZ and PISCES trials comparing it to sunitinib. Her work has also included clinical evaluation of tivozanib, cabozantinib, lenvatinib, and dovitinib, and exploration of immune checkpoint blockade in kidney cancer.

== Honors and awards ==
- Fellow, American College of Physicians (1989)
- Folke Edsmyr Memorial Award, Karolinska Institute (1994)
- Grande Ufficiale al Merito della Repubblica Italiana (2004)
- Premio Minerva for Scientific Achievement (2007)
- ESMO Award for Outstanding Contribution to Medical Oncology (2013)
- Pieter de Mulder Award, EIKCS (2017)
- Excellence in Oncology Award, Oncology Times (2020)
- Order of Merit of the Italian Republic (2004) Awarded by: Italian Government

In July 2025, she was profiled as an Outstanding Author by Translational Cancer Research.

== Selected publications ==
- Hussain, M.; Fizazi, K.; Saad, F.; Sternberg, C. N. (2018). "Enzalutamide in men with nonmetastatic, castration-resistant prostate cancer". New England Journal of Medicine. 378 (26): 2465–2474. doi:10.1056/NEJMoa1800536. PMID 29949494.
- Sternberg, C. N.; Fizazi, K.; Saad, F.; Shore, N. D.; De Giorgi, U.; Penson, D. F.; Ferreira, U.; Efstathiou, E.; Madziarska, K.; Kolinsky, M. P.; Cubero, D. I. G.; Noerby, B.; Zohren, F.; Lin, X.; Modelska, K.; Sugg, J.; Steinberg, J.; Hussain, M. (2020). "Enzalutamide and survival in nonmetastatic, castration-resistant prostate cancer". New England Journal of Medicine. 382 (23): 2197–2206. doi:10.1056/NEJMoa2003892. PMID 32469183.
- Sternberg, C.; Armstrong, A.; Pili, R.; Nguyen, T.; Hochberg, T.; Sandin, R.; Patel, K.; Iversen, P. (2016). "Randomized, double-blind, placebo-controlled phase III study of tasquinimod in men with metastatic castration-resistant prostate cancer". Journal of Clinical Oncology. 34 (22): 2636–2643. doi:10.1200/JCO.2015.66.9678. PMID 27269944.
- Sternberg, C. N.; Castellano, D.; de Bono, J.; Omlin, A.; Shore, N.; Mainwaring, P.; Craig, J.; Nilsson, S.; Maroto, P.; Ozatilgan, A.; Petrylak, D. P.; Bracarda, S.; Buroni, M.; Zivi, A.; Fizazi, K. (2021). "Efficacy and safety of cabazitaxel versus abiraterone or enzalutamide in older patients with metastatic castration-resistant prostate cancer in the CARD study". European Urology. 80 (4): 497–506. doi:10.1016/j.eururo.2021.06.021. PMID 34247916.
- Elemento, O.; Khozin, S.; Sternberg, C. N. (2025). "The use of artificial intelligence for cancer therapeutic decision-making". NEJM AI. 2 (5). doi:10.1056/AIra2401164.
- Sternberg, C. N.; de Mulder, P.; Schornagel, J. H.; Theodore, C.; Fossa, S. D.; van Oosterom, A. T.; von der Maase, H.; Stoter, G.; Somers, R.; de Balincourt, C.; Collette, L. (2006). "Seven-year update of an EORTC phase III trial of high-dose intensity M-VAC chemotherapy and G-CSF versus classic M-VAC in advanced urothelial tract tumours". European Journal of Cancer. 42 (1): 50–54. doi:10.1016/j.ejca.2005.08.032. PMID 16326096.
- Sternberg, C. N.; Skoneczna, I.; Kerst, J. M.; Albers, P.; Fossa, S. D.; Collette, L.; van der Heijden, A. G.; Oosterlinck, W.; van Rhijn, B. W.; de Reijke, TM.; Oliver, T.; Kiemeney, LA.; Sherif, A.; Stenzl, A.; De Santis, M.; Krege, S. (2015). "Immediate versus deferred chemotherapy after radical cystectomy in patients with pT3–pT4 or N+ M0 urothelial carcinoma of the bladder (EORTC 30994): an intergroup, open-label, randomised phase 3 trial". Lancet Oncology. 16 (1): 76–86. doi:10.1016/S1470-2045(14)71160-X. PMID 25498218.
- Sternberg, C. N.; Loriot, Y.; James, N.; Choy, E.; Castellano, D.; Lopez-Rios, F.; Bann, G. L.; De Giorgi, U.; Masini, C.; Bamias, A.; Garcia del Muro, X.; Duran, I.; Powles, T.; Gamulin, M.; Zengerling, F.; Geczi, L.; Gedye, C.; de Ducla, S.; Fear, S.; Merseburger, A. (2019). "Primary results from SAUL, a multinational single-arm safety study of atezolizumab therapy for locally advanced or metastatic urothelial or non-urothelial carcinoma of the urinary tract". European Urology. 76 (1): 73–81. doi:10.1016/j.eururo.2019.02.024. PMID 30878505.

== Personal life ==
Since 1988, Sternberg has been married to academic Vito Pansadoro. They have two children, Vincenzo Pansadoro and Tatiana Pansadoro.
