= Cora Amalia Castilla =

Mexican politician

Cora Amalia Castilla Madrid (born 27 January 1961 in Chetumal, Quintana Roo) is a Mexican politician and activist. A member of the Partido Revolucionario Institucional (PRI), she was municipal president of the municipality of Othón P. Blanco from 2005 to 2008, President of the PRI in Quintana Roo from 2009 to 2011, and has been Secretary of Culture of the State Government of Quintana Roo and Deputy in the Congress of Quintana Roo twice.

== Biography ==
Cora Amalia Castilla received her diploma in 1994 at Instituto Tecnológico de Chetumal y NAFIN. She went on to earn her Masters in Accounting and Finance and Business Administration (1998) at the University of the Americas - Puebla in San Andrés Cholula, Puebla.

Initially, she worked in her profession in private practices in the city of Puebla de Zaragoza, in 1986 she began her activity within the government of Quintana Roo, from 1988 to 1993 in the government of Miguel Borge Martín she held the position of State Comptroller, later she held several positions in the structure of the PRI in Quintana Roo and in 1997 she was elected alternate federal deputy and in 1999 deputy to the Congress of Quintana Roo for the I Local Electoral District of Quintana Roo and where she was president of the Finance, Budget and Public Accounts commission and member of those of Municipal Affairs, Equity and Gender, Regulations, Economic and Social Development and Border Affairs.

In 2001, she was a PRI pre-candidate for the Municipal Presidency of Othón P. Blanco, but did not obtain the nomination. From 2002 to 2003 she was General Secretary of the PRI State Committee and from 2003 to 2004 she was General Director of the Quintana Roo College of Bachelors System.

She won the PRI candidacy for Municipal President of Othón P. Blanco in 2004 and was elected in the constitutional elections of 2005, began her government on 10 April 2005 and concluded it on the same date in 2008, being named Secretary of Education of the state government on the same day, during her tenure in this position her resignation was demanded by her opponents considering that she used the position to promote herself politically; on 22 January 2009, Governor Félix González Canto appointed her Secretary General of Government, and remained in office until 7 December of the same year when she resigned to be appointed president of the PRI state committee in Quintana Roo.

In 2024, Cora Amalia Castilla and Luis Ross, registered for the PRI for federal deputies of the Front for Quintana Roo.
