= Cora Harrington =

American writer and lingerie expert

- Education: Agnes Scott College (BA)
- Occupations: Writer, lingerie expert
- Years active: 2008–present
- Known for: The Lingerie Addict (website)
- Notable work: In Intimate Detail: How to Choose, Wear, and Love Lingerie

Cora Harrington is an American writer and lingerie expert. She is the founder and editor-in-chief of the blog The Lingerie Addict (2008–2022). In 2018, she released the book In Intimate Detail: How to Choose, Wear, and Love Lingerie.

== Early life and education ==
Harrington was raised in a small town in central Georgia. She was a shy child and an avid reader. Her interest in the fashion industry started when she browsed the editorial photographs in magazines like Vogue and Lucky during her childhood.

She received her bachelor's degree with a double major in anthropology and sociology from Agnes Scott College.

== Career ==
Harrington began the blog Stockings Addict to write primarily about stockings in 2008. She was inspired to begin the site after she had difficulty finding reviews or recommendations of lingerie on the internet. She later changed the name of the blog to The Lingerie Addict and broadened the writing to focus on all intimate apparel. In 2012, Harrington transitioned to working on the website full-time from her nonprofit job as a crisis line worker.

The site "review[s] lingerie and offer informative guides for junkies and casual underwear-wearers alike." Harrington also publishes information on bra sizing and the economics behind the pricing of intimate apparel. She has written about inclusion issues in the lingerie industry, including the lack of large sizes at traditional brands and the lack of nude-toned lingerie for women with brown skin. The Lingerie Addict attracts over 100,000 readers every month. Evan Ross Katz of Paper referred to it as "the world's largest lingerie blog." Harrington closed The Lingerie Addict blog in April 2022, with plans to continue working in fashion. She cited decreased web traffic resultant in part from systemic bias against the site's topic on social networking platforms.

Harrington was approached by Ten Speed Press editor Kaitlin Ketchum to write a book on lingerie. She released the book In Intimate Detail: How to Choose, Wear, and Love Lingerie in August 2018. The book discusses different kinds of intimate apparel and offers shopping tips for readers. In Intimate Detail includes illustrations of the lingerie rather than photographed models. The book's content is inclusive of readers who are trans and disabled and uses gender-neutral language throughout. It was recommended by The New Yorker.

== Personal life ==
Harrington is queer. She is married.

== Works ==
- In Intimate Detail: How to Choose, Wear, and Love Lingerie. Ten Speed Press, August 28, 2018. First edition. ISBN 9780399580635.
