= Cora Dow =

American pharmacist and businesswoman

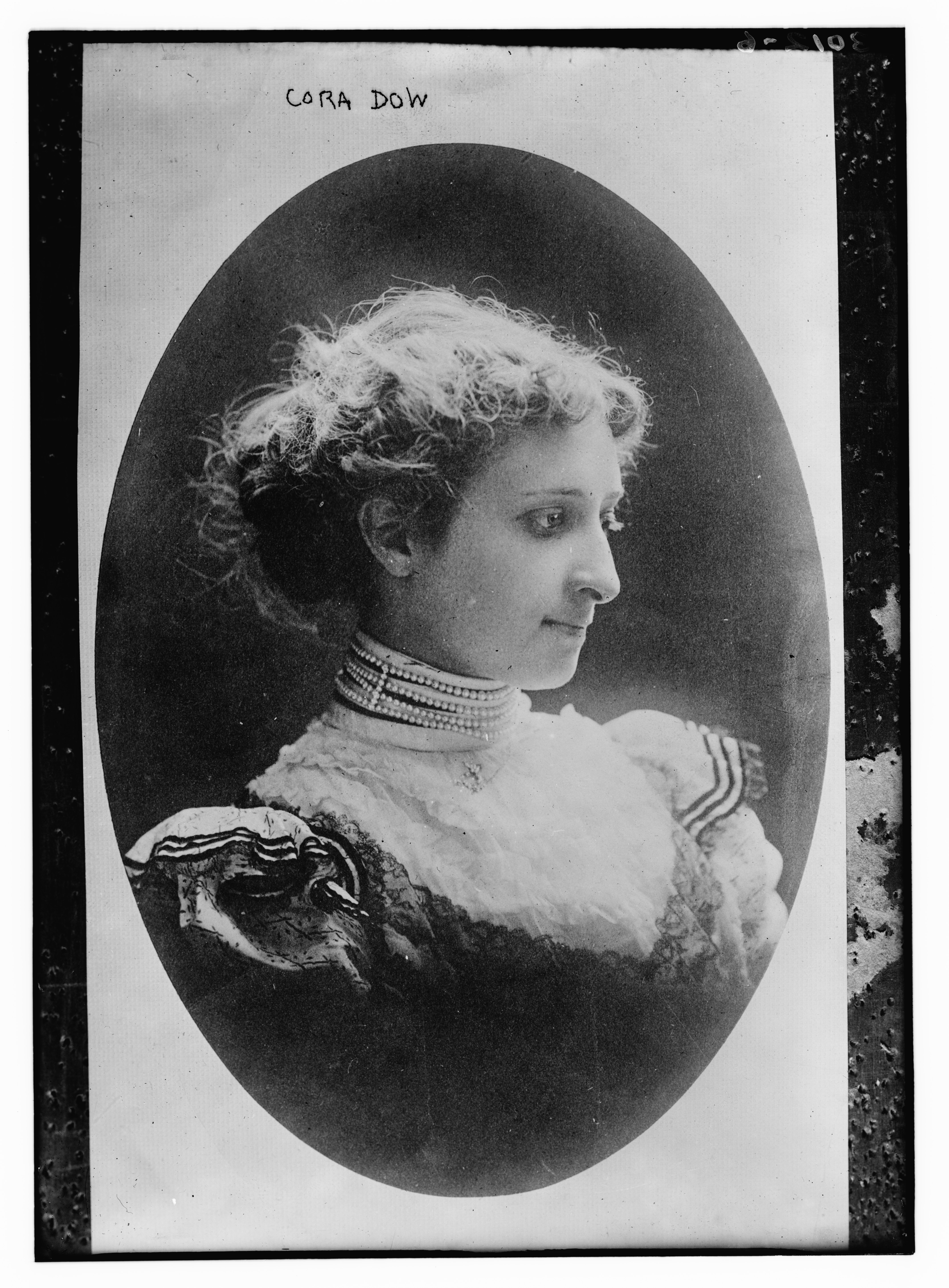
Cora Dow

Cora Dow (1868–1915) was a pharmacist in Cincinnati, Ohio, the leading female pharmacist of her time, with eleven stores under her name when she died.

== Life and career ==
Her father owned a drugstore, and she graduated from the Cincinnati College of Pharmacy and later took over the store when he died. She also bought an ice cream factory and produced her own brand of ice cream because she did not think the kind sold in her store was good enough. She paid women the same as men, and furnished her stores so that women would be comfortable there. Her stores sold products at below the normal retail price, which was not often done then. Some manufacturers refused to sell to her because of this, but she challenged their pricing practices in court and won.

She was also interested in animals, and campaigned nationally for the idea that horses should have a two-week annual vacation.

She was married to accountant William W. Goode from 1897 until 1904. After that she took care of her mother.

She sold her business to an investment group in 1915 due to poor health, and died later that year. William Howard Taft eulogized her. In her will she gave the Cincinnati Symphony Orchestra more than $700,000; she had always loved music and wanted to be a musician.
