= Edith Monture =

First Indigenous-Canadian woman to gain the right of suffrage

- Born: Charlotte Edith Anderson; April 10, 1890; Six Nations of the Grand River, Ohsweken, Ontario, Canada
- Died: April 3, 1996 (aged 105)
- Occupation: Nurse

Charlotte Edith Anderson Monture (10 April 1890 – 3 April 1996), known simply as Edith Monture, was a Mohawk World War I veteran, known as the first Indigenous-Canadian woman to become a registered nurse, as well as to gain the right to vote in a Canadian federal election. She was the first Indigenous woman from Canada to serve in the United States military.

== Early life ==
Charlotte Edith Anderson was born on 10 April 1890 on the Six Nations of the Grand River reserve at Ohsweken near Brantford, Ontario, Canada. She was the youngest in a family of eight children of Mohawk descent, attending day school on the reserve and earning a high school diploma from Brantford Collegiate Institute.

== Career and overseas service in First World War ==
She had to train as a nurse in the United States because all of the Canadian nursing schools refused her due to her race. The Indian Act of 1876 prevented access to higher education to Indigenous people. Edith Anderson studied at the New Rochelle Nursing School in New York and graduated top of her class, becoming the first Indigenous registered nurse in Canada in 1914.

Anderson worked as an elementary school nurse, but left that job in 1917 to join the Army Nurse Corps. It is believed that she was presented with ceremonial Mohawk clothing as burial wear before she left for overseas service in case she died in the war.

Anderson served in France at a military hospital. She was one of fourteen Indigenous women from Canada and the United States who served as members of the Army Nurse Corps in France during World War I. Cora E. Sinnard (née Elm) was a member of the Oneida tribe who also served in France).

Anderson was stationed near the front lines, working as a nurse at Base Hospital 23 in Vittel, Grand Est, France, for a year as well as elsewhere in France. She worked 14 hour days, and walked battlegrounds to find and treat the wounded. She treated soldiers injured in trench warfare and gas attacks.

== Post war ==
Anderson moved back to the Six Nations reserve, where she was born, after the end of the World War I. The Canadian Military Service Act (1917) gave wartime nurses the right to vote, and under these terms, she became the first Indigenous-Canadian woman to gain the right to vote in a Canadian federal election. It took until 1960 for all Indigenous women to get the federal vote without relinquishing their "Indian status" in Canada.

Anderson continued to work in healthcare and worked as a nurse and midwife a hospital on the reserve until 1955, when she retired aged 65. As Edith Monture she worked hard to improve Indigenous health care. In 1939 Monture was elected honorary president of the Ohsweken Red Cross.

== Personal life ==
Anderson married Claybran Monture soon after she returned to the reserve and they had five children, Bud, Helen, Ron, Don and Gilbert, who died as an infant in 1929. She had 14 grandchildren.

Edith Monture died on 3 April 1996 in Ohsweken, Ontario, one week before her 106th birthday and was buried in St. John's Anglican Cemetery on the reserve.

== Legacy and commemoration ==
Charlotte Edith Anderson Monture is recognized as a pioneering figure in Indigenous health care, veteran services, and civil rights.

Monture was designated a National Historic Person in 2025 by the Government of Canada, under the Historic Sites and Monuments Act, for her trailblazing role as a nurse and veteran.

She is celebrated as the first Indigenous Canadian woman to become a registered nurse, graduating from New Rochelle Nursing School in New York after facing racial barriers in Canadian institutions.

Monture’s wartime service as a nurse with the United States Army Nurse Corps during World War I placed her at Base Hospital No. 23 in Vittel, France. Her service contributed to her receiving the federal vote under the Military Voters Act of 1917, making her one of the first Indigenous women in Canada to gain the federal franchise.

After the war, she returned to the Six Nations of the Grand River, where she continued to practice nursing and midwifery, and was elected honorary president of the Ohsweken branch of the Canadian Red Cross in 1939.

Her birthplace and work are commemorated through Indigenous Nurses Day on April 10, a date established in recognition of her contributions and continuing influence in Indigenous health care.

Public commemoration of her life includes street and community names in Brantford, Ontario. Edith Monture Avenue, Edith Monture Park and Edith Monture Elementary School in Brantford are all named after her.
