= Cora Minnett =

Australian actress and author (1868-? )

Cora Minnett (1868 – after 1918) was an Australian author, actress, and confidence trickster. Her birth name was Minnie Warren Jones, but she later assumed the stage name Cora Minnett Vane, and wrote under the pen name Pellew Hawker. She is known for her science fiction and fantasy novels.

== Early life and education ==
Minnie Warren Jones was born in 1868, with her birthplace registered as Pittwater in the Colony of New South Wales. Her parents were Eliza Warren (1840–1902) and James Jones, and her sister, Ruth Jones, was later an artist and/or actor.

== Career ==
Jones left school at 19, and in 1888 started her career as a stage actress called Cora Minnett Vane. She married Adolphus J. Braggett in Sydney in 1892, but left him a few years later, returning to the stage as Cora Minnett. Her agent, subsequently manager, was Herbert Cowell, who said he was an actor who was born in New Zealand. They met in Melbourne in 1907, the year she divorced Braggett in New South Wales.

She moved to London in 1910, where she lived at 117 St. George's Square. She registered herself in the telephone book as a journalist and author, and began writing novels under the names Cora Minnett and Pellew Harker. She also wrote and articles for Answers, the Ladies' Home Journal, and the Ladies' Home Companion.

She also advertised her services as a clairvoyant.

Her 1911 science fiction novel, The Day After To-Morrow is set in America, which has become a monarchy, in 1975. In this world, women enjoy equality with men, and it is regarded as an example of early feminist utopian science fiction. It is regarded as belonging to the sub-genre of "Pax Aeronautica".

The Girdle of Kaf (1912) is a verse fantasy about the afterlife.

Minnett published a story and poem titled "The Failure" on 16 April 1914 in the Northern Territory Times and Gazette.

== Financial trickery ==
Minnett appears to have engaged in conning victims in England by selling them non-existent or wrongly described plots of land in Australia, setting up an office in The Strand. She travelled to Australia and opened an account at the Commercial Bank of Australia in Sydney in the name of Pellen Hawker, later transferring the account to their London office. She also travelled to Canada to view land prospects there.

Various investors parted with their money, including a Mr. White who subsequently sued her for the return of his £373. Walter Robson, a cashier at the Commercial Bank of Australia, loaned her total of £2700, anticipating repayment with profits from her company in 1914. However, Robson stole the money from the bank to pay her. Minnett and Herbert Cowell, who pretended to be siblings, shuffled the money to various accounts, but to no avail. In 1914 she was put on trial in London for theft of £2700, which Robson was alleged to have wrongfully delivered to her from the Commercial Bank of Australia.

During the trial, it emerged that Minnett had told the bank manager that she had spent £3000 of money received from Robson to entertain suffragettes, intending to make use of the movement to recruit more emigrant to Australia, as part of her large settlement scheme. She also intended to get her "brother" (Cowell) into the House of Commons. Robson was sentenced to 18 months' imprisonment. Minnett's lawyers said that she did not know that the money she got from Robson was stolen, believing it to be a loan. However, she and Cowell (who had also gone under the name Herbert Hawker) were sued for the return of the stolen money. The judge found that she and Cowell were liable to return the money to the bank, as they had tried to conceal its existence, and must have known that a bank cashier would not typically have access to such large amounts of money. Minnett appealed against the verdict in May 1914.

== Later life ==
Minnett was living in England in 1918, but no further records of her existence have been recorded.

== Works ==
=== As Cora Minnett ===
- The Haunted Selection and other verses. Melbourne, Victoria, McCarron, Bird & Co., c.1900.
- The Day After To-morrow. London, F. V. White & Co., 1911.
- Lucky, with Pellew Hawker, illus. A. MacNeill-Barbour. London, F. V. White & Co., 1911.
- The Model Millionaire. London, W. J. Ham-Smith, 1911.
- Fortune-Telling by Numbers. London, C. Arthur Pearson, 1912.
- The Girdle of Kaf (verse). London, W. J. Ham-Smith, 1912.

=== As Pellew Hawker ===
- God Disposes. London, Stanley Paul & Co., 1911.
- Lucky, with Cora Minnett.
