= List of storms named Cora =

The name Cora has been used for one tropical cyclone in the Atlantic Ocean, eight in the western Pacific, and one in the South Pacific. It was also used by The Weather Channel for a winter storm that began over Texas on January 9, 2025.

Cora was used for one tropical cyclone in the Atlantic:

- Hurricane Cora (1978), after crossing Central America into the Pacific Ocean, the system reformed and became Hurricane Kristy

Cora was used for seven tropical cyclones in the Western Pacific and one in the Central Pacific:

- Typhoon Cora (1953) (T5320)
- Hurricane Cora (1958), formed in the Central Pacific
- Typhoon Cora (1961) (T6105, 20W)
- Typhoon Cora (1964) (T6406, 08W, Huaning), peaked as a Category 5 super typhoon; made landfall in the Philippines as a tropical storm
- Typhoon Cora (1966) (T6618, 18W), Category 5 super typhoon; struck the Ryūkyū Islands
- Typhoon Cora (1969) (T6909, 09W, Ibiang), struck southern Japan
- Typhoon Cora (1972) (T7215, 16W)
- Typhoon Cora (1975) (T7513, 15W, Luding)

Cora was used for one tropical cyclone in the South Pacific:

- Cyclone Cora (1998), some damage to Tonga
