= Cora Elm =

American nurse

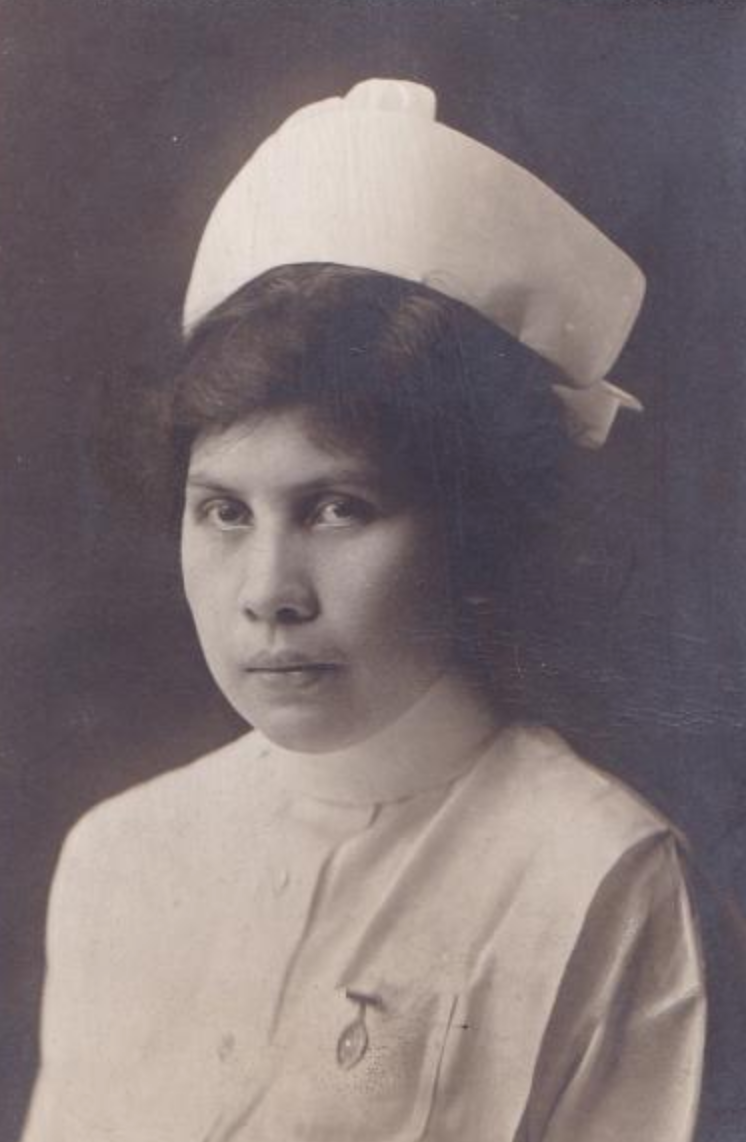
- Cora Elm in nurse's uniform in 1916
- Born: February 18, 1891; Oneida reservation, Wisconsin
- Died: June 9, 1949 (aged 58); North Carolina
- Other name: Cora Sinnard (married name)
- Occupation: Nurse

Cora Elm (February 18, 1891 – June 9, 1949) was an American nurse. She was a member of the Oneida Nation, and attended the Carlisle Indian Industrial School from 1906 to 1913. She served as a Red Cross nurse in France during World War I.

== Early life and education ==
Elm was born on the Oneida Reservation in Wisconsin, one of eleven children born to Nicholas Elm and Jane Hill Elm. Her home language was Oneida. Her father was a farmer, born in Canada, and her grandmother was a midwife. Her grandfather Jacob Hill was a hereditary chief in the Oneida nation. She attended the Carlisle Indian School from 1906 to 1913, and trained as a nurse at the Episcopal Hospital School of Nursing in Philadelphia, graduating in 1916.

== Career ==
Elm worked as supervisor of the wards at the Episcopal Hospital after she graduated. Elm participated in demonstration for women's suffrage at the White House in 1917.

In December 1917, Elm volunteered for overseas service and sailed to France, where she worked as a Red Cross nurse at the base hospital in Nantes. Elm wrote about her wartime experiences for the Carlisle Arrow magazine. "My life overseas was not very easy. Although I was in a base hospital, I saw a lot of the horrors of war. I nursed many a soldier with a leg cut off, or an arm", she later wrote. In 1920 she was sent by the Red Cross to do relief work in Russia, Latvia, and Lithuania. She was one of at least 14 Native American nurses known to serve in Europe during the war (another being Charlotte Edith Anderson Monture), though others served in stateside military hospitals.

After marriage and motherhood, she was a ward supervisor at Fort Bayard in New Mexico, and at Wood Veterans Hospital in Milwaukee.

== Personal life ==
Elm married James E. Sinnard in 1921. They had a son, James Jr., born in 1926, before they divorced. In 1934, she was charged with breaking her husband's car windows, and her brother and two other men were charged with assault against her husband, but the charges were dropped. Her son served in World War II. She died in 1949, aged 58 years, at a veterans' hospital in North Carolina. She was buried with military honors, and her gravesite at Holy Apostles Church Cemetery in Oneida includes a military headstone.
