= Mount Pope Provincial Park =

Provincial park in British Columbia, Canada

- IUCN category II (national park)
- Location within British Columbia
- Interactive map of Mount Pope Provincial Park
- Location: British Columbia, Canada
- Nearest city: Fort St. James
- Coordinates: 54°29′37″N 124°20′29″W
- Area: 20.3 km^{2} (7.8 sq mi)
- Established: January 25, 2001
- Governing body: BC Parks

Mount Pope Provincial Park is a provincial park in British Columbia, Canada, located 7km northwest of Fort St. James in the Omineca Country region of that province's Central Interior. Mount Pope is about 1420 meters high and composed of limestone. The trail to the summit from Stones Bay Road gains about 700m and may be followed year-round. There are a few dozen developed rock climbs up to seven pitches long on the lower flanks of the mountain. In total, there are 39 documented climbs located within the park.
