= Grupo Positivo =

Brazilian holding company

- Type: Holding
- Industry: Education; Publishing; IT Services
- Founded: 1972
- Headquarters: Curitiba, Paraná, Brazil
- Key people: Oriovisto Guimarães (Founder)
- Net income: ▲US$ 315.15 million (2017)
- Number of employees: 10,000
- Website: Positivo Group

Grupo Positivo is a Brazilian holding company headquartered in the city of Curitiba, Brazil. In addition to maintaining a significant presence in the technology sector through Positivo Tecnologia, it is also present in private education, printing, and publishing sectors. It is also responsible for the editing and printing of the Aurélio Dictionary since 2003.

== Companies ==
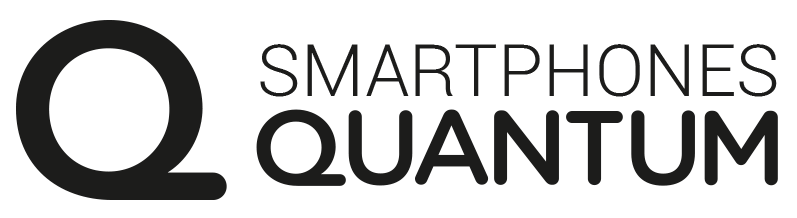
Quantum, brand of the Group.

Positivo was founded in 1972 by a group of enterprising professors led by Oriovisto Guimarães. Initially focused solely on providing preparatory courses for the Brazilian university entry exam, it has since expanded into the areas of higher education, IT services, printing and publishing, technology, and entertainment. The following companies and institutions are part of Grupo Positivo:

- Positivo Tecnologia: The largest computer manufacturer in Latin America and tenth largest in the world. Technology arm of the group.
- Posigraf: One of the largest printing plants in Latin America. Printing arm of the group.
- Editora Positivo: Publishing arm of the group. Its learning system is used by over 867,000 students in Brazil.
- Universidade Positivo: Private university. Currently offers 27 undergraduate programs, a doctoral program, three master's degree programs.
- Teatro Positivo: The largest theatre in the state of Paraná. Hosts a wide range of events.

In addition, its education unit counts with seven private K-12 schools and over 40,000 enrolled students.
