= BR-376 (Brazil highway) =

Highway in Brazil

BR-376

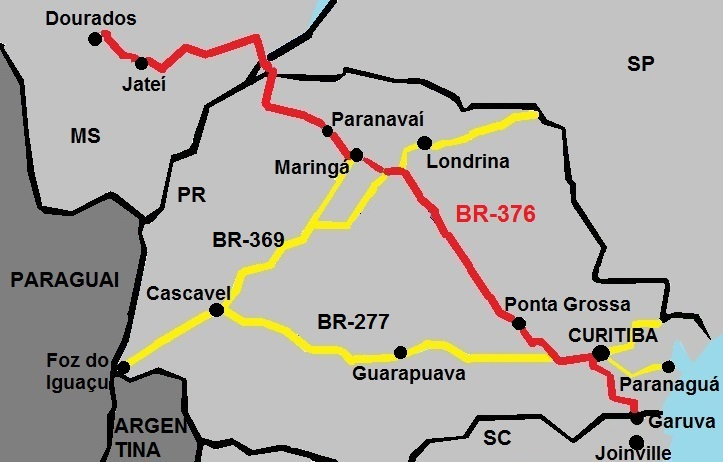

Route information
- Length: 958.3 km (595.5 mi)

Major junctions
- North end: Dourados, Mato Grosso do Sul
- South end: Garuva, Santa Catarina

Location
- Country: Brazil

Highway system
- Highways in Brazil; Federal

The BR-376, also known as Rodovia do Café (Coffee Highway), is a Brazilian federal highway that connects the cities of Garuva, in the state of Santa Catarina, to Dourados, Mato Grosso do Sul. It has a total length of 958.3 km.

== History ==
The Rodovia do Café route (Coffee Highway) was initially considered by the imperial government of Brazil. A report of the expedition led by the German engineers, José and Francisco Keller, addressed to the Imperial Government, in which they demonstrated for the opening of this highway, with interest even for a transcontinental highway, pointed out the shortest path between the coast of Brazil and Mato Grosso through the territory of Paraná. It was the first draft of the future highway.

Several subsequent studies were carried out to find the best route through the rivers Ivaí, Tibaji and adjacent sertões. In 1871, in Curitiba, the cornerstone of the bridge was laid over the Ivo River, when the construction of the Estrada de Mato Grosso began, which was extended to the northwest of the Estrada da Graciosa. This road extended through Campo Largo, Palmeira and Ponta Grossa. Starting in 1928, with the first Paraná Highway Plan, guidelines were drawn up to comply with the connection with the northern region of the State. Until 1939, there was no road connecting the north of Paraná with the port of Paranaguá; With the exception of the railroad, only freighters and wagons carried out transport in the intermediate regions. The north and south connection of the State was made by the old Estrada do Cerne, a road full of curves, narrow and without pavement.

Construction of a new highway began in 1944. With the creation of the DER in 1946, construction continued, the work of which at an early stage was opened to traffic in 1951. The work that made a great impact in Paraná in the 1960s was the Rodovia do Café. When the global guideline for Rodovia do Café was defined, with the most appropriate route for the flow of crops to the Port of Paranaguá, several solutions were suggested. At the beginning of that decade, its basic implementation was only 154 km long. The main objective of the period was to pave the Ponta Grossa-Apucarana section. This highway would be the main outlet for coffee crops, promoting the circulation of wealth and acting as an instrument of internal economic, social and political integration. Also called Rodovia da Integração, it provided, at the end of its construction, the flow of more than 4 million tons of agricultural production, mainly coffee and cereals. With the official delivery to traffic, in July 1965, Rodovia do Café made possible a considerable reduction in travel time, since a loaded truck, on average, took 18 hours to travel in the previous 38 hours, shortened by 142 km the section from Maringá to the port of Paranaguá, thus contributing to a greater movement of the port of Paraná, to the detriment of that of Santos.

== Economic importance ==
The highway is commonly used to transport agricultural, livestock and industrial products from the states of Paraná and Mato Grosso do Sul. As some examples, we have soy, corn, coffee, beef, paper and cellulose, wood, furniture and other important products. in the region.

== Duplications ==
The highway is duplicated in a few parts, as in the sections between Curitiba and Ponta Grossa, and between Maringá and Paranavaí.

BR-376, as well as BRs 277 and 369, which form a triangle within the state of Paraná, were granted to private companies in 1997, at the beginning of the era of road concessions in Brazil. The contracts are valid until 2021. Initially, 995 km of roads in Paraná should be duplicated, and the population was promised that the State would have First World highways, strongly boosting economic growth. But additions were soon signed that removed duplications and other works from the contracts. The duplication commitment fell from 995 to 616 km. To make matters worse, in 2019, what had been doubled was no more than 300 km, even with toll rates rising every year. The MPF (Federal Public Ministry) then carried out Operation Integration, which showed that the changes made to the contracts are part of a millionaire kickback scheme. The companies paid at least R $ 35 million in fees to achieve these changes in contracts. The estimated diversion of money in the toll system amounts to R $ 8.4 billion. Some of those cited by the MPF to receive these fees are: Jaime Lerner, Roberto Requião and Beto Richa, all former governors of the State of Paraná, and the concessionaires Rodonorte, Econorte, Ecovia, Ecocataratas, Caminhos do Paraná and Viapar.

For the next concession, to take place in 2021, the Federal Government, under the command of Jair Bolsonaro, and the Government of the State of Paraná, under the command of Ratinho Jr., intend, together, adopt a model with lower tariffs, ensure that duplications occur quickly, and also ensure transparency in spending.

== Gallery ==
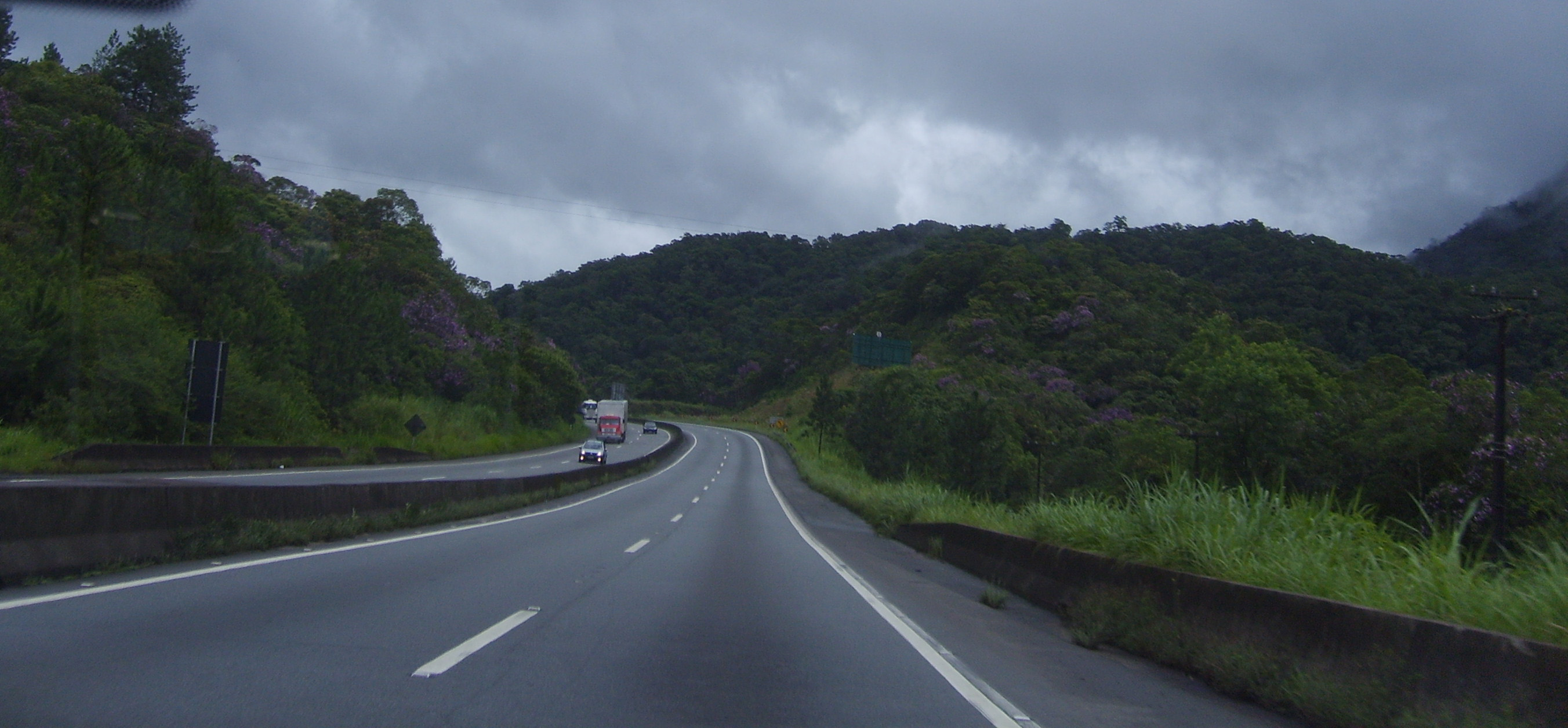
BR-376 between Curitiba and Garuva, Paraná.

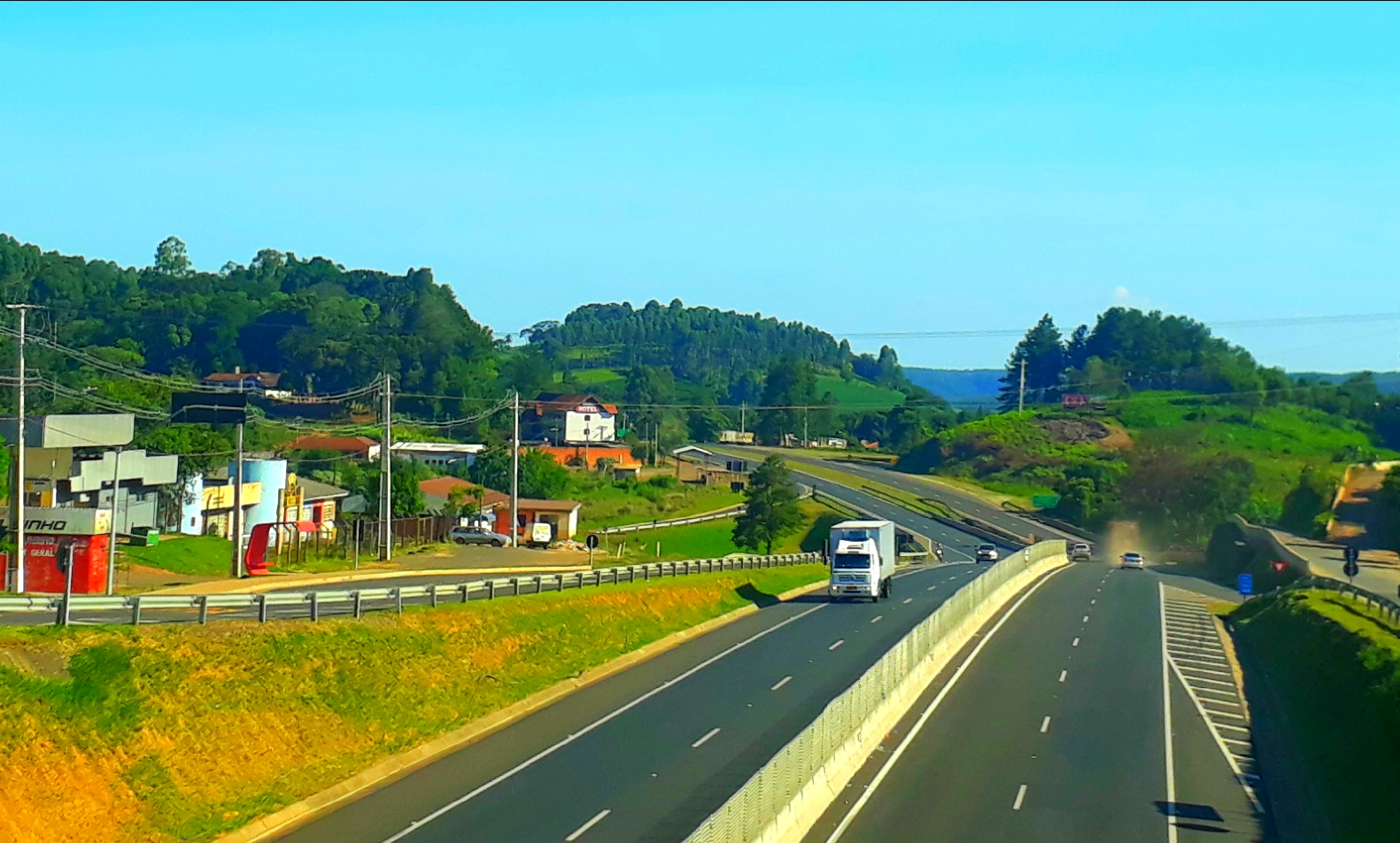
BR-376 in Imbaú, Paraná.

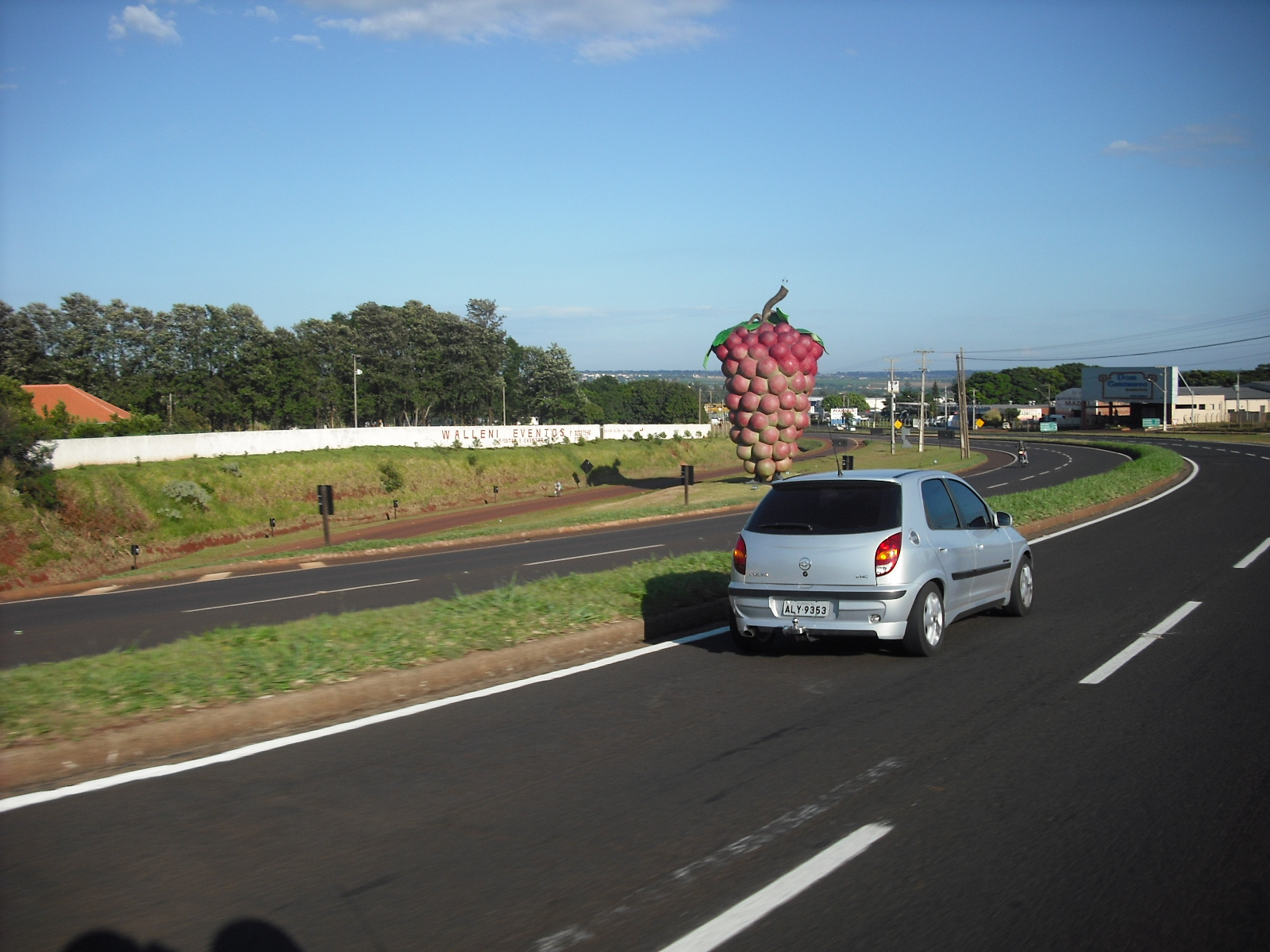
BR-376 in Marialva, Paraná.
