= Oriovisto Guimarães =

Brazilian politician

Senator for Paraná
- Incumbent
- Assumed office February 1, 2019
- Preceded by: Gleisi Hoffmann

Personal details
- Born: August 12, 1945 (age 81) Batatais, São Paulo, Brazil
- Party: PODE (2018-present); PSDB (2008-2018)
- Education: Federal University of Paraná

Oriovisto Guimarães (born August 12, 1945) is a Brazilian politician. He has represented Paraná in the Federal Senate since 2019 and he is a member of Podemos. He was president of Grupo Positivo and rector of the Universidade Positivo.

== Personal life ==
Oriovisto was born in Batatais, the youngest of 8 siblings. His father was a friend of Luís Carlos Prestes, and was subsequently persecuted by Getúlio Vargas until relocating to the state of Paraná. At the age of 17, Oriovisto moved to Curitiba, where he studied Economics at the Federal University of Paraná. During this period, he took an active role in the anti-dictatorship movement, which ultimately led to his arrest in 1968 while attending the XXX Congress of the National Student Union in Ibiúna.

Once older, he became a math teacher and ultimately founded the Positivo Group alongside fellow teachers in 1972. The group grew significantly under his command, as it expanded into the technology, printing and editing fields. The largest computer manufacturer in Latin America, Positivo Tecnologia, was founded as one of the group's arms in 1989. He remained as the conglomerate's president until 2012, when he stepped down and donated his shares to his children Giem, Sofia, and Lucas.

== Political career ==
While Oriovisto was a member of PSDB for over ten years, he never ran for public office before 2018. A personal friend of Álvaro Dias, he joined Podemos in 2018. He was the most voted candidate for the Federal Senate in the state of Paraná in 2018, receiving nearly three million votes. During his time in office he has stood in favor of a political reform, advocating against 'political entrepreneurship' and same-office reelection. He is also a supporter of the simplification of the Brazilian tax system in order to encourage greater business activity.

In 2019, Oriovisto was elected Brazil's best senator by Ranking dos Politicos, a renowned ranking that takes several variables into consideration.
