= Cirol =

Cirol may refer to:

- Cirol (town), the original name of Imbaú in Paraná, Brazil
- CIROL, the EPPO code of Cirsium oleraceum
