= Positivo Tecnologia =

Brazilian producer of computers

Positivo Tecnologia S.A.
- Trade name: Positivo Tecnologia
- Formerly: Positivo Informática S.A. (1989–2017)
- Type: Public company
- Traded as: B3: POSI3
- Industry: Hardware; Software; Consumer electronics; IT services
- Founded: May 1989; 37 years ago
- Founder: Oriovisto Guimarães, Helio Bruck Rotenberg
- Headquarters: Curitiba, Paraná, Brazil
- Key people: Helio Bruck Rotenberg (CEO)
- Products: Consumer electronics; Hardware; Educational technology; IT service management
- Brands: List: Educacional – Ecossistema de Tecnologia e Inovação; Positivo Casa Inteligente; Positivo Segurança Eletrônica; Positivo Servers & Solutions; Positivo Soluções em Pagamentos; Positivo Tech Services; Quantum; VAIO
- Revenue: ▲ R$3.354 billion (2025)
- Operating income: ▲ R$312.6 million (2025)
- Net income: ▲ R$12.2 million (2025)
- Total assets: ▲ R$4.47 billion (2025)
- Parent: Grupo Positivo
- Divisions: Positivo BGH
- Subsidiaries: List: Positivo Smart Tecnologia; Portal Mundo Positivo; Crounal; Positivo Argentina; Boreo Indústria de Componentes; Positivo Distribuição e Comércio; Positivo Tecn. Fundo de Invest. em Partic. em Emp. Emergentes; SC Indústria de Equipamentos Eletrônicos
- Website: www.positivotecnologia.com.br

Positivo Tecnologia (B3: POSI3, formerly Positivo Informática) is a Brazilian company providing end-to-end IT infrastructure solutions, headquartered in Curitiba, Paraná. The company develops, manufactures and sells computers, mobile phones, tablets, smart home and office devices, servers, IT infrastructure, payment solutions, educational technologies and electronic security solutions.

The company operates manufacturing facilities in Ilhéus, Bahia, and Manaus, Amazonas, and has operations in 17 countries across Latin America, as well as in China and Taiwan.

== Products ==
The portfolio of products and services is distributed across retail, corporate, and Brazilian public institutions.

- Desktops
- Notebooks
- All-in-One
- Smartphones + Mobile Phones
- Tablets
- Smart Home (Casa Inteligente)
- Payment Solutions (POS)
- Servers
- Educational Technology
- Special Projects
- PositivoSEG

== History ==
1989 – Founded as Positivo Informática to manufacture and sell computers to schools belonging to Grupo Positivo and to schools using the Positivo educational system.

1990 – Began supplying computers and IT solutions to companies and public-sector institutions through public procurement processes.

1994 – Created its Educational Technology division, developing educational software for schools and the retail sector.

2000 – The Educational Technology division created Portal Educacional to serve private schools.

2001 – Created Portal Aprende Brasil for public schools.

2004 – Entered the retail computer market.

2005 – Began selling desktops, notebooks and servers to the corporate market, surpassing the milestone of 500,000 computers produced for this segment.

2006 – Became a publicly traded company and joined the "IGC" (Differentiated Corporate Governance Index) and "ITAG" (Differentiated Tag Along Index). In the same year, it received the award for Best Company in the Technology and Computing Sector from Exame magazine's Melhores e Maiores ranking and was named the most recognized brand among computer manufacturers in the Folha de S.Paulo Top of Mind surveys.

2007 – Reached the leading position in Brazil's computer market, selling 1.389 million PCs, placing it among the world's ten largest desktop computer manufacturers. Opened an office in Taipei, Taiwan.

2008 – Opened a manufacturing facility in Manaus, Amazonas.

2011 – Began the internationalization of the brand through BGH in countries including Argentina and Uruguay.

2012 – Entered the mobile phone market.

2013 – Opened an office in Shenzhen, China.

2014 – Began manufacturing tablets and computers in Rwanda, Africa.

2015 – Launched the Quantum smartphone brand and obtained a license to manufacture and sell VAIO notebooks in Brazil. It was investigated over an alleged bid-rigging scheme in public procurement processes.

2016 – Acquired a 50% stake in HiT (Hi Technologies), a company specializing in technological equipment for the healthcare sector.

2017 – Changed its name to Positivo Tecnologia to reflect the diversification of its businesses. Expanded its operations in Africa by entering the Kenyan market. Opened another manufacturing facility in Manaus, Boreo Indústria de Componentes, for the production of motherboards.

2018 – Launched the 2A.M. gaming computer brand in Brazil. Opened Quantum operations in Argentina and Chile. Acquired an 80% stake in Accept.

2019 – Entered into partnerships with MindCET to accelerate startups in the Amazon, and with the Government of Amazonas and the Court of Justice of Amazonas to bring educational technology to environments with no or limited connectivity.

2020 – Completed a follow-on share offering. Formed a task force to increase the production capacity of Magnamed mechanical ventilators in Brazil during the COVID-19 pandemic. The company won the contract to manufacture the new electronic voting machines used in the 2022 elections. In the same year, it was accused by SindMetal of abusive labor practices, including employees performing duties outside their job descriptions and wages below those established by the Ministry of Labour and Employment. Also in 2020, at the height of the COVID-19 pandemic, Positivo Tecnologia contributed to the development of mechanical ventilators in Brazil. The technology company was responsible for identifying and qualifying suppliers globally. Positivo negotiated delivery schedules and prices and assisted in the procurement of components in high demand on the global market, such as valves, transducers and electronic circuit boards, an essential component for the operation of mechanical ventilators.

2021 – Licensed the brand and incorporated the Brazilian operations of Compaq. Was elected to the board of the Distributed Management Task Force (DMTF), a U.S.-based industry organization that brings together global technology companies and promotes best practices in the IT market. Entered into a partnership with Infinix Mobile, a brand of global company Transsion Holdings, and launched the Infinix Note 10 Pro. Partnered with Stone to supply SmartPOS devices and with NEXGO to manufacture smart payment terminals. In the same year, it won the contract to manufacture the new electronic voting machines used in the 2024 elections.

2022 – Launched the Positivo Tech Services business unit to provide technical services and support to corporations throughout Brazil.

2023 – Launched the PositivoSEG business unit, focused on automation and electronic security for the business-to-business market, and acquired SecuriCenter, a distributor of technology equipment and solutions for the automation and electronic security market.

2024 – Acquired Algar Tech MSP, the IT managed services provider (MSP) unit of Algar Tech. Launched Positivo S+, a brand offering technology and IT management services.

2025 – Opened Positivo Labs, an AI Center of Excellence, in Curitiba.

2026 – Partnered with Intel and launched AI PCs at the Consumer Electronics Show (CES). Partnered with Tencent and launched a payment solution using palm biometric recognition. Repositioned its brand as an end-to-end IT infrastructure company. Launched a platform called "Splithub" to help companies prepare for the tax reform in Brazil.
