= Imbaú =

Coordinates: 24.445°S 50.7608°W

Municipality of Imbaú
- Municipality
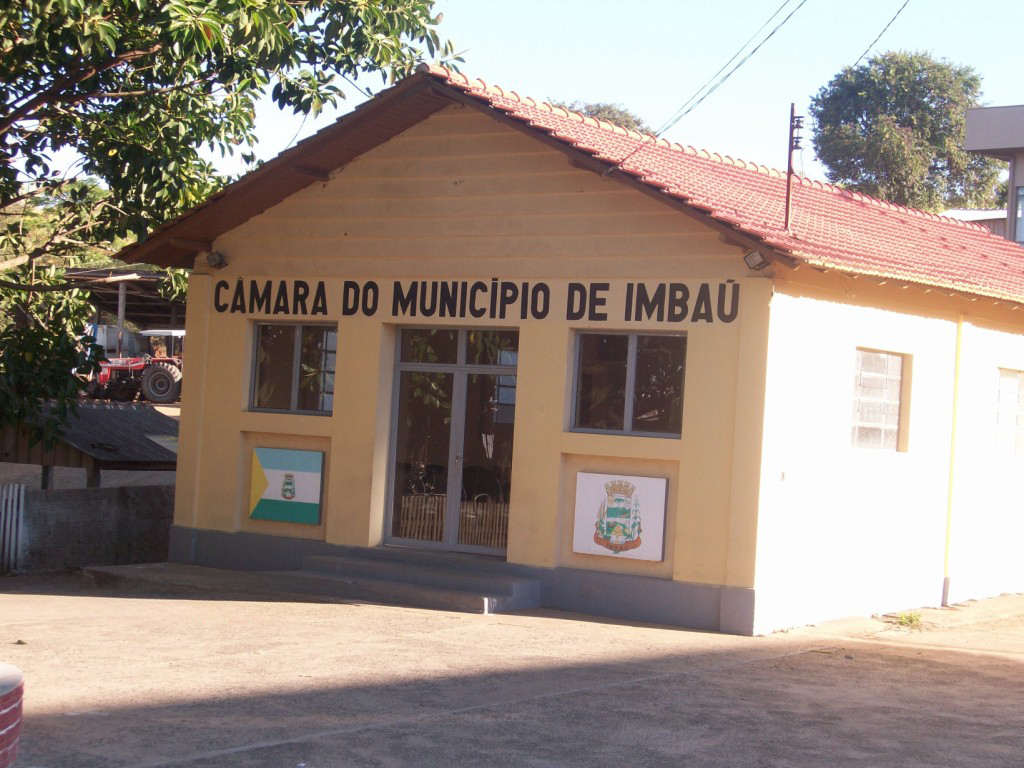

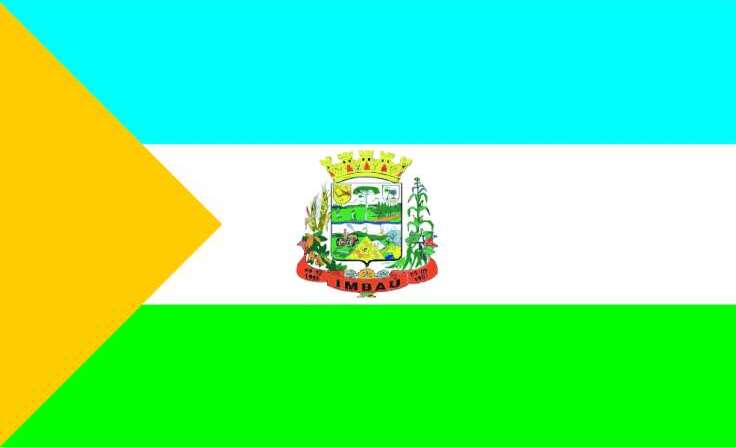
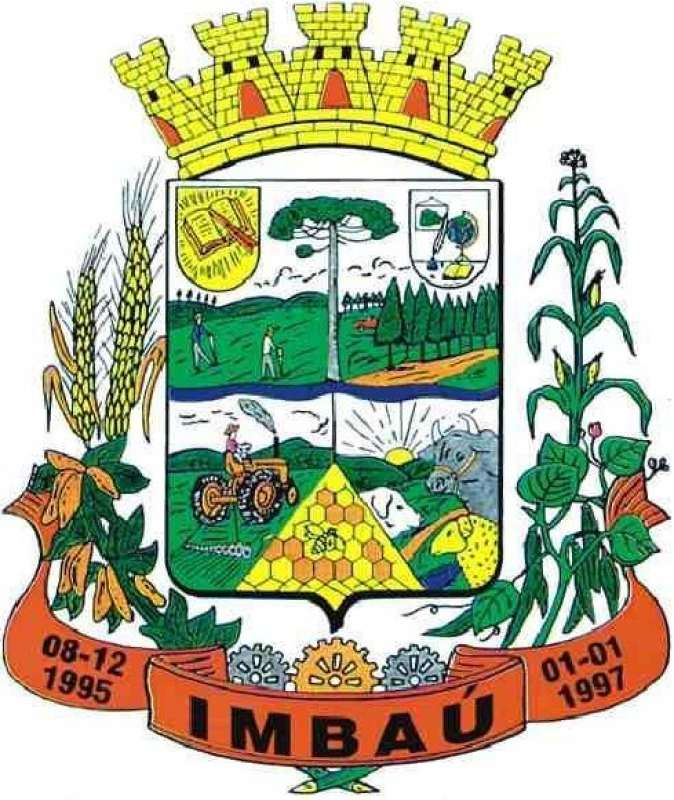
- Flag Coat of arms
- Interactive map of Municipality of Imbaú
- Country: Brazil
- Region: Southern
- State: Paraná
- Mesoregion: Centro Oriental Paranaense

Population (2020)
  - Total: 13,282
- Time zone: UTC -3

Imbaú is a municipality in the state of Paraná in the Southern Region of Brazil. It has an estimated population 13,282 in 2020.

Imbaú is a municipality settled in the mid-1990s. Its economy is based on timber production. Family farming also stands out. The first name given to the town was Cirol. So far, residents refer to the town this way. The name Cirol comes from an asphalt paving company that was in the town in the mid-1960s, along BR-376 (Rodovia do Café). The name Imbaú has geographic origin. There are two watercourses with that name: Imbaú River and Imbauzinho River. According to older residents, the name comes from a springlet located on the road where Rodovia do Café was built.

== See also ==
- List of municipalities in Paraná
