= Garuva =

Coordinates: 26.0269°S 48.855°W

Garuva, Santa Catarina
- Municipality
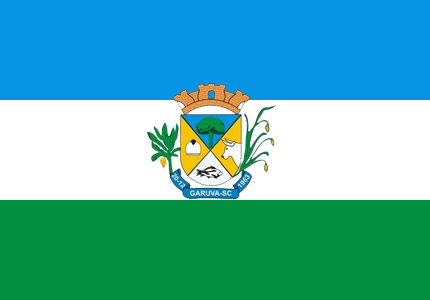
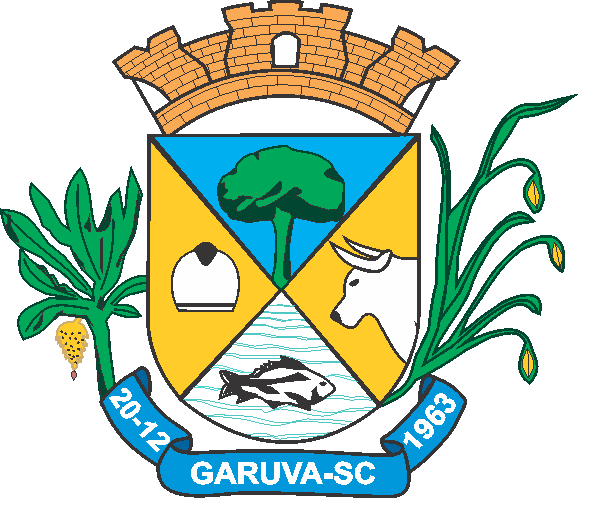
- Flag Coat of arms

- Location of Garuva
- Country: Brazil
- Region: South
- State: Santa Catarina
- Mesoregion: Norte Catarinense

Population (2020)
  - Total: 18,484
- Time zone: UTC -3
- Website: www.garuva.sc.gov.br

Garuva is a municipality in the state of Santa Catarina in the South region of Brazil.

== See also ==
- List of municipalities in Santa Catarina
