= Paraná (state) =

State of Brazil

- State
- Flag Coat of arms
- Anthem: Hino do Paraná
- Location in Brazil
- Coordinates: 24°0′S 51°0′W
- Country: Brazil
- Region: South
- Capital and largest city: Curitiba

Government
  - Type: Unitary state
  - Governor: Ratinho Júnior (PSD)
  - Vice Governor: Darci Piana (PSD)
  - Senators: Flávio Arns (PSB); Oriovisto Guimarães (PSDB); Sergio Moro (PL)
  - Legislature: Legislative Assembly of Paraná

Area
  - Total: 199,298.982 km^{2} (76,949.767 sq mi)
  - Rank: 15th

Population (2025)
  - Total: 11,890,517
  - Rank: 5th
  - Density: 59.661705/km^{2} (154.52311/sq mi)
  - Rank: auto
- Demonym: Paranaense

GDP (2024)
  - Total: R$726.628 billion (US$134.837 billion)

HDI
  - Year: 2024
  - Category: 0.822 - very high (4th)
- Time zone: UTC-3 (BRT)
- Postal Code: 80000-000 to 87999-999
- ISO 3166 code: BR-PR
- Website: www.parana.pr.gov.br

Paraná (/ˌpɑːrəˈnɑː/ PAR-ə-NAH, Brazilian Portuguese: [paɾɐˈna]) is one of the 26 states of Brazil, in the south of the country. It is bordered in the north by São Paulo state, in the east by the Atlantic Ocean, in the south by Santa Catarina and the Argentine province of Misiones, and in the west by Mato Grosso do Sul and Paraguay, with the Paraná River as its western boundary. It is subdivided into 399 municipalities, and its capital is the city of Curitiba. Other major cities are Londrina, Maringá, Ponta Grossa, Cascavel, São José dos Pinhais and Foz do Iguaçu. The state is home to 5.4% of the Brazilian population and generates 6.2% of the Brazilian GDP.

Crossed by the Tropic of Capricorn, Paraná has what is left of the araucaria forest, one of the most important subtropical forests in the world. At the border with Argentina is the National Park of Iguaçu, considered by UNESCO as a World Heritage Site. 40 km (25 mi) from there, at the border with Paraguay, the largest dam in the world was built, the Hidroelétrica de Itaipu (Itaipu Hydroelectric Dam). The crime rate is considered low by Brazilian standards and the state is one of the most developed ones in the nation, ranking 4th in gross domestic product, only behind the states of Rio de Janeiro, São Paulo and Minas Gerais.

== History ==
Before the discovery of the region by European explorers, indigenous populations inhabited the region for thousands of years. This included the Carijó in the lands closer to the sea, from the Tupi group, and the Caingangues in the interior, who belonged to the Jê group.

Colonisation of the state by settlers started in the 16th century, but was mainly confined to the coasts. Being a region mostly abandoned by the Portuguese, the region was explored by other European countries, who searched primarily for brazilwood. The most noteworthy presence was that of the Spanish, which brought with them Jesuits. Soon, Jesuit reductions were opened in the western and south-western parts of the state, whose territory largely belonged to the Spanish crown. In 1554, Domingo Martínez de Irala founded the town of Ontiveros, one league away from the Guaíra Falls.

In the 1940s, the northern part of the state was settled as a result of the expansion of the São Paulo coffee industry. The south-eastern part of the state was settled as a result of migration from Rio Grande do Sul.

== Geography ==
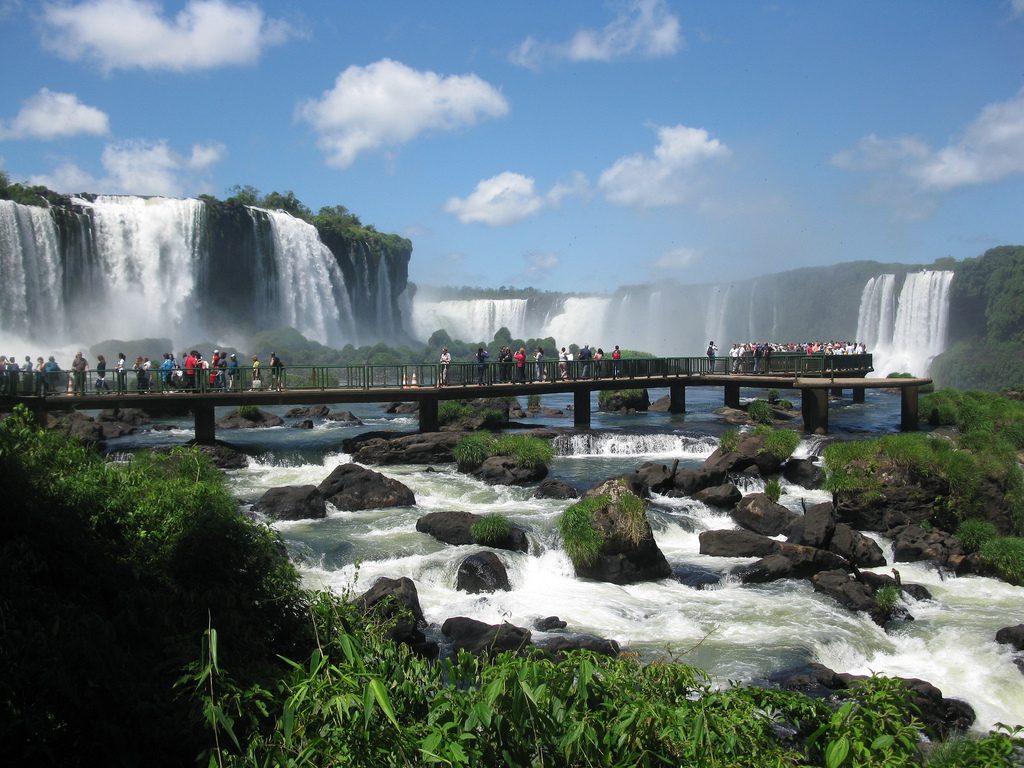
Iguazu Falls

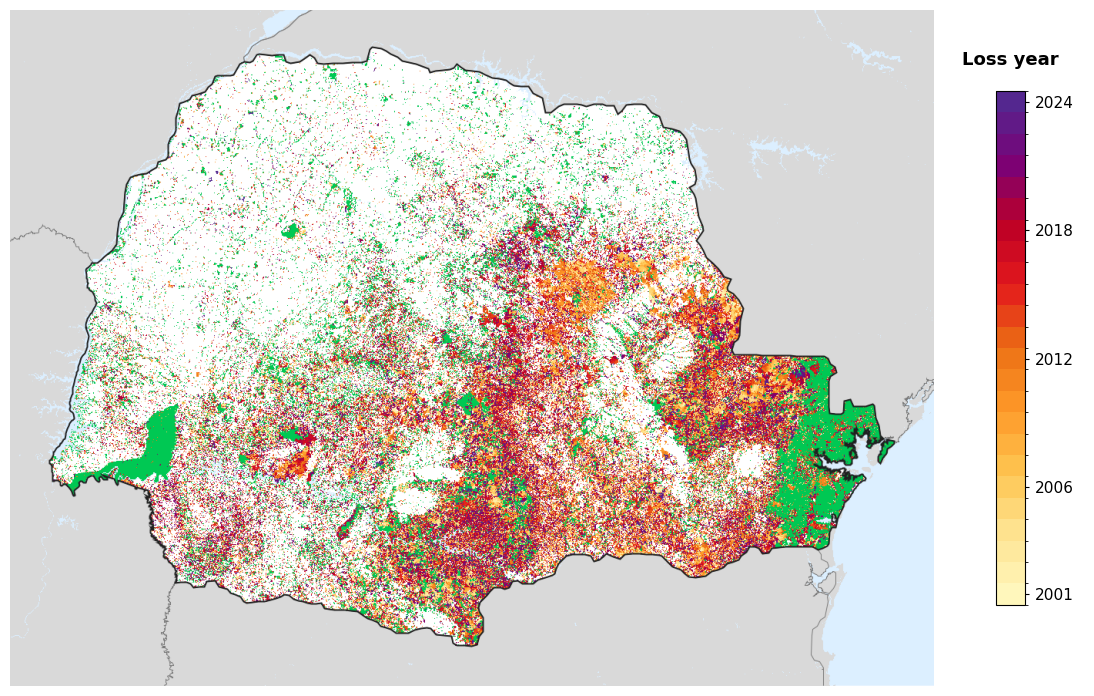
Tree-cover loss year in Paraná, 2001-2024, from the Global Forest Change dataset.

Paraná is bounded on the north by São Paulo state, on the east by the Atlantic Ocean, on the south by Santa Catarina state and the Misiones Province of Argentina, and on the west by Mato Grosso do Sul and the republic of Paraguay, with the Paraná River as its western boundary line.

The state can be separated into five main topographic areas, from east to west: a coastal zone, the mountains of Serra do Mar, and then three plateaus, each lower than the other, until the Paraná River is reached.

=== Climate ===
Climate types of Paraná

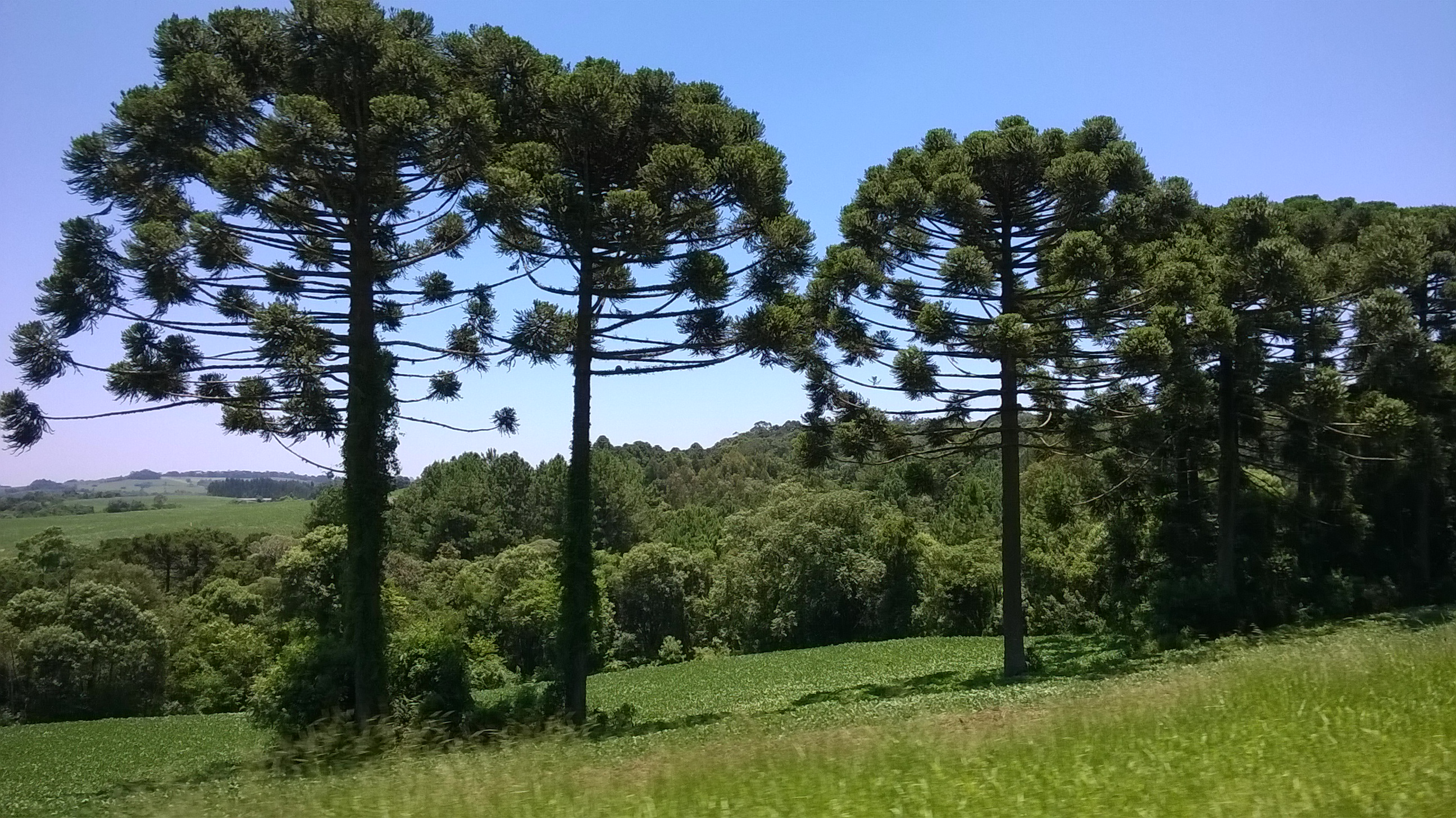
Araucaria is a symbol of Paraná.

The climate of Paraná is predominantly temperate mesothermal, and the vast majority of the state's territory is divided between two main climate types:

- The humid subtropical climate (Cfa), characterized by hot summers (with the mean temperature of the warmest month exceeding 22 °C), cool winters, and evenly distributed precipitation throughout the year. This is the predominant climate type in the plains and coastal areas;
- The temperate oceanic climate (Cfb), characterized by mild summers (with the mean temperature of the warmest month below 22 °C), cool to cold winters, and evenly distributed precipitation throughout the year. This is the predominant climate type in the crystalline plateau regions and higher-altitude areas of the Serra Geral (General Mountains) mountain range.

However, a very small portion of Paraná's territory (approximately 5.7% of the state) has a tropical climate with a dry season (Aw), characterized by hot, humid summers and dry, warm winters (with the mean temperature of the coldest month exceeding 18 °C), making it a megathermal climate type. This climate type occurs in the state's far north and far northwest, including the microregions of Paranavaí, Umuarama, and Cianorte.

According to data from the National Institute of Meteorology (INMET), the lowest absolute temperature ever recorded in the state was −11.5 °C, on July 18, 1975, in the city of Palmas. Conversely, the highest temperature recorded in Paraná was 42.5 °C, in the municipality of Capanema, on April 27, 2025, according to the Paraná Environmental Technology and Monitoring System (Simepar).

== Demographics ==
Historical population
Year	Pop.	±%
1872	126,722	—
1890	249,491	+96.9%
1900	327,136	+31.1%
1920	685,711	+109.6%
1940	1,236,276	+80.3%
1950	2,115,547	+71.1%
1960	4,296,375	+103.1%
1970	6,997,682	+62.9%
1980	7,749,752	+10.7%
1991	8,443,299	+8.9%
2000	9,564,643	+13.3%
2010	10,444,526	+9.2%
2022	11,444,380	+9.6%

Parana is the sixth most populous state in Brazil. Its level of urbanization is 83.5%.

=== Ethnic groups ===
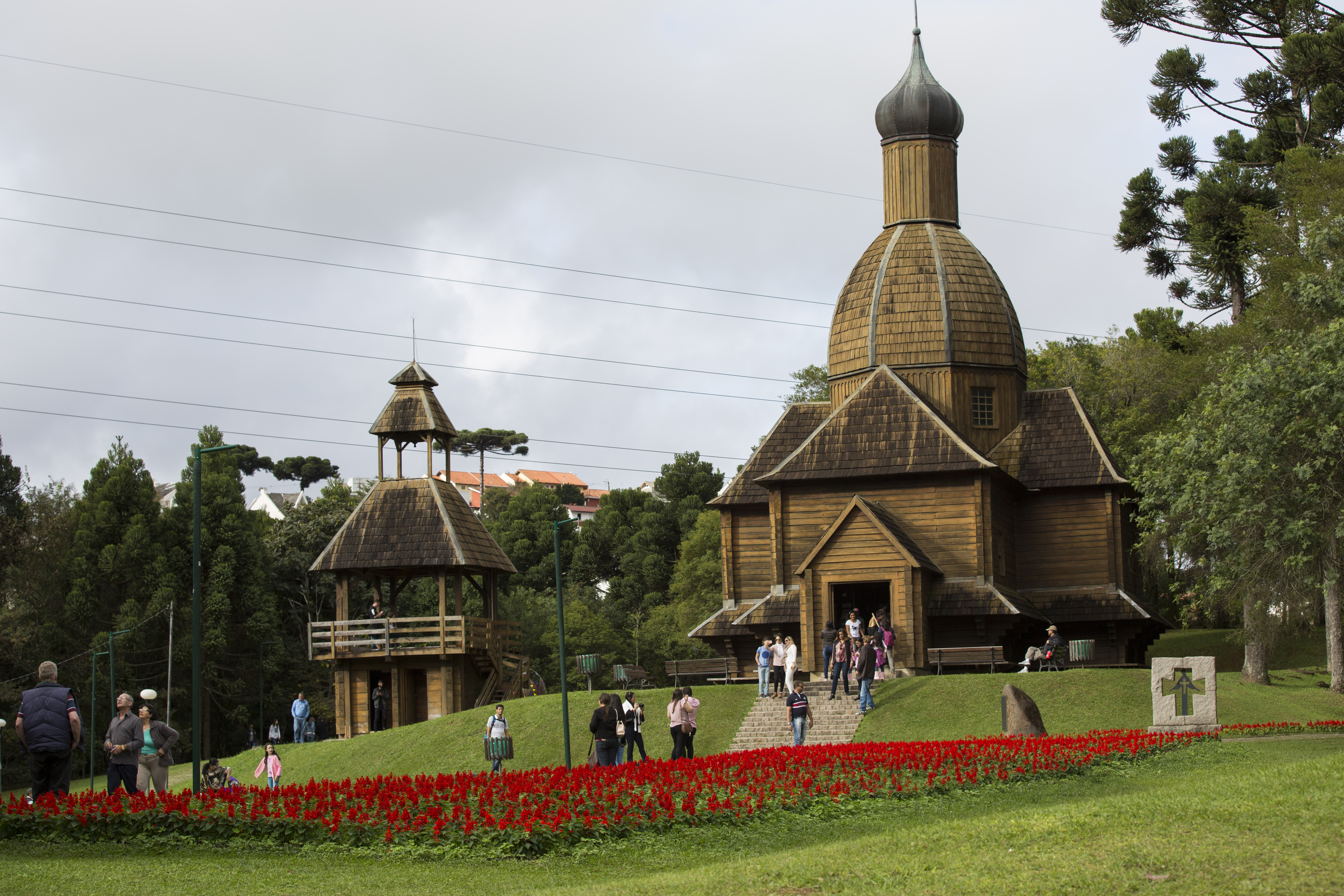
Ukrainian memorial in Curitiba

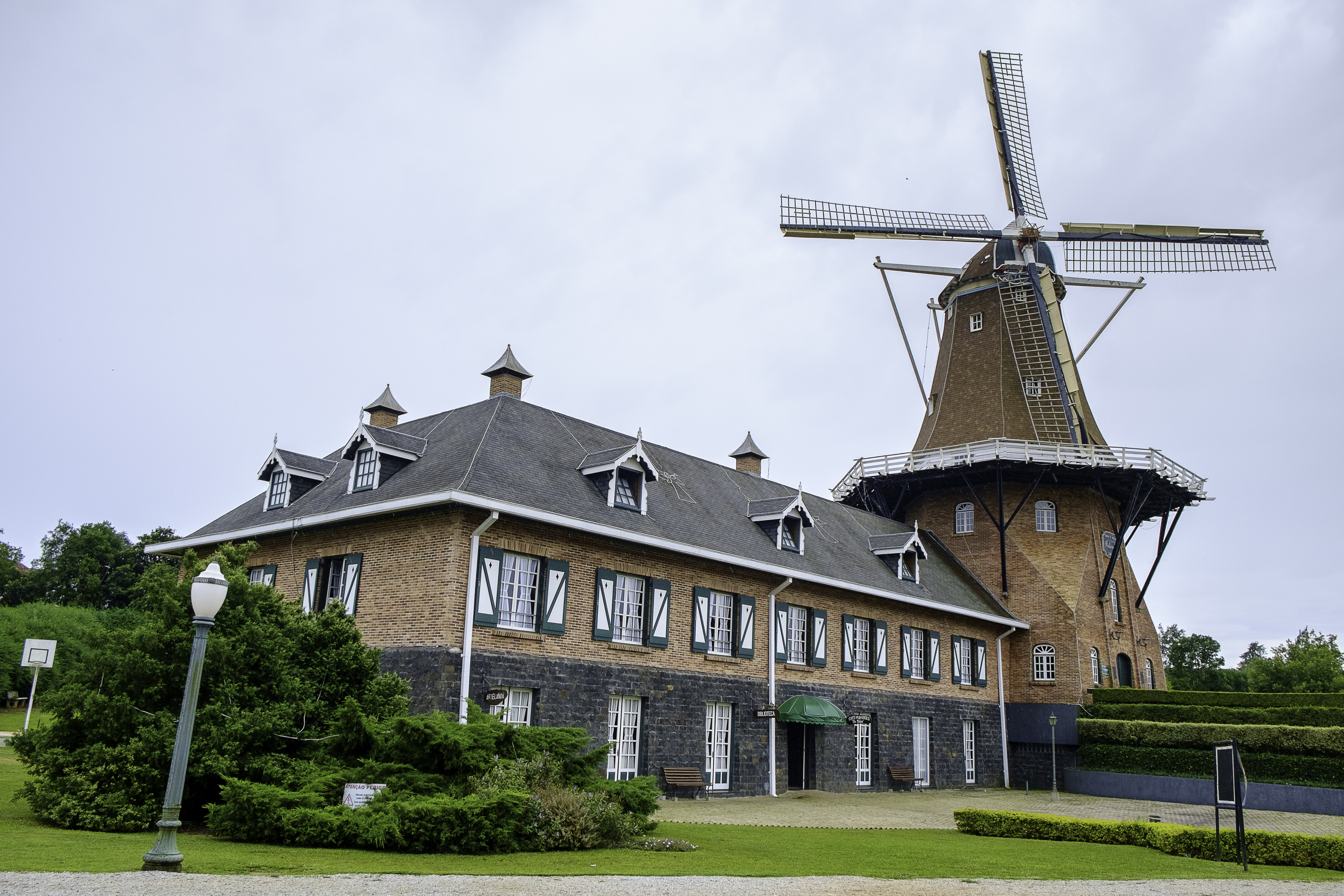
Mill in the Dutch colony of Castrolanda

Race and ethnicity in Paraná
Ethnicity	Percentage
White	64.6%
Mixed	30.1%
Black	4.2%
Asian	0.9%
Amerindian	0.2%

The 2022 census survey gave the following breakdown by race for the state: 7,389,932 White (64.6%), 3,440,037 Mixed (30.1%), 485,781 Black (4.2%), 100,244 Asian (0.9%), and 28,000 Amerindian (0.2%).

Parana's white population is primarily descendant of Portuguese, Italian, Polish and Ukrainian immigrants, but many German families also settled in the state. A variation of German known as Paraná-Wolga-Deutsch originated in the area.

Initially settled by the Guarani and Kaingang Amerindians, until the 17th century, virtually no European presence existed in Paraná. The number of settlers grew around 1750 and the population was composed of Amerindians, Portuguese, and some Spaniards. African slaves from Angola and Mozambique were also present, but in fewer numbers than in other Brazilian areas, because Paraná was an unexplored region that did not need much slave manpower. As part of the province of São Paulo, immigration grew in the mid-19th century, mostly composed of Italian, German, Polish, Ukrainian, and Japanese peoples. While large numbers of Poles and Ukrainians are present in Paraná, their presence in the rest of Brazil is relatively small, especially Ukrainians. In the early 20th century, two waves of migration to Paraná occurred: one coming from the north, mostly of Portuguese, but also of African and Amerindian origin, and another from southern Brazil to the southwest and west, mostly of Portuguese, Italian, and German origins.

=== Major cities ===
Most populous cities in Parana

Largest cities or towns in Paraná (state) (2021 Census by Brazilian Institute of Geography and Statistics)
Rank		Pop.
1	Curitiba	1,963,730
2	Londrina	565,760
3	Maringá	428,260
4	Ponta Grossa	350,920
5	Cascavel	317,100
6	São José dos Pinhais	300,030
7	Foz do Iguaçu	255,830
8	Colombo	237,850
9	Guarapuava	181,504
10	Paranaguá	154,936

=== Religion ===
Religion in Paraná (2010)
1. Catholic Church (69.6%)
2. Protestantism (22.2%)
3. Spiritism (1.00%)
4. Other religions (2.60%)
5. Irreligious (4.60%)

According to the 2010 Brazilian Census, most of the population (69.6%) is Roman Catholic, other religious groups include Protestants or evangelicals (22.2%), Spiritists (1.0%), None 4.6%, and people with other religions (2.6%).

=== Education ===
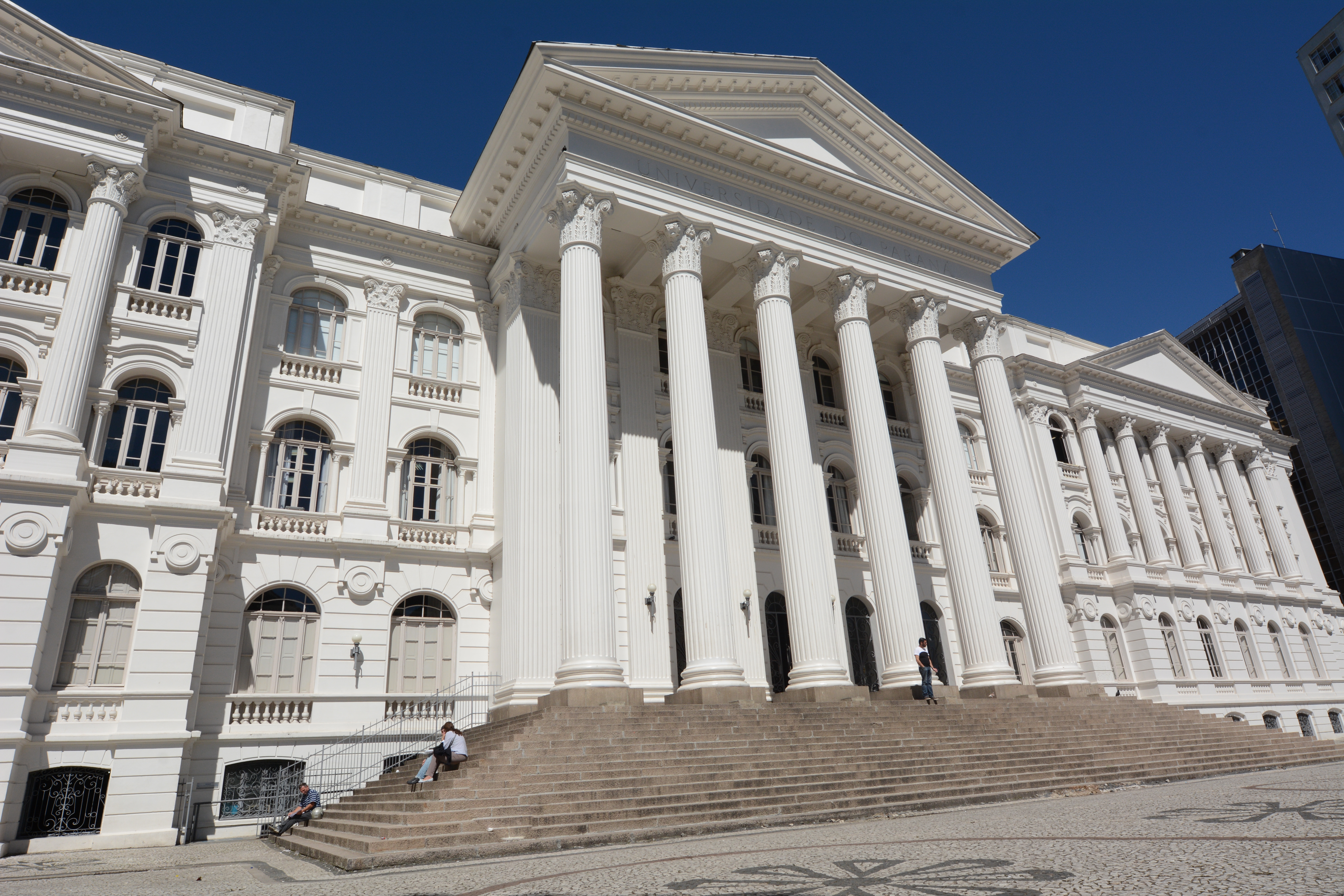
Federal University of Paraná

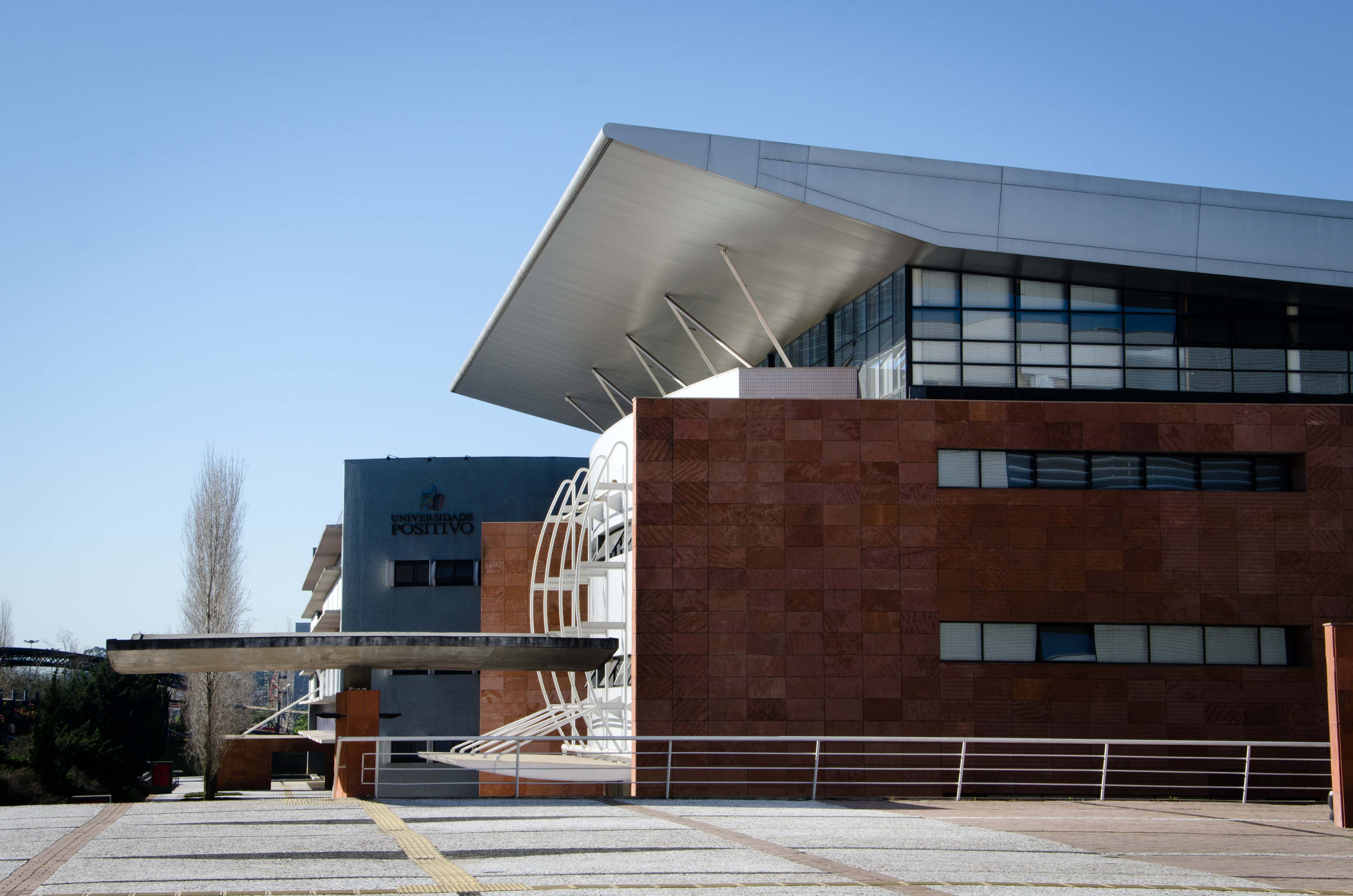
Positivo University

=== Educational institutions ===
- Federal University of Paraná
- Positivo University
- Federal University of Technology – Paraná (UTFPR)
- Pontifical Catholic University of Paraná
- Centro Universitário Curitiba (UNICURITIBA)
- State University of Ponta Grossa
- State University of Londrina
- State University of Maringá
- Universidade Estadual do Centro-Oeste
- Western Paraná State University
- North Paraná State University (UNP)
- Universidade Estadual do Paraná (UNESPAR)
- Centro Universitário Unifacear

== Economy ==
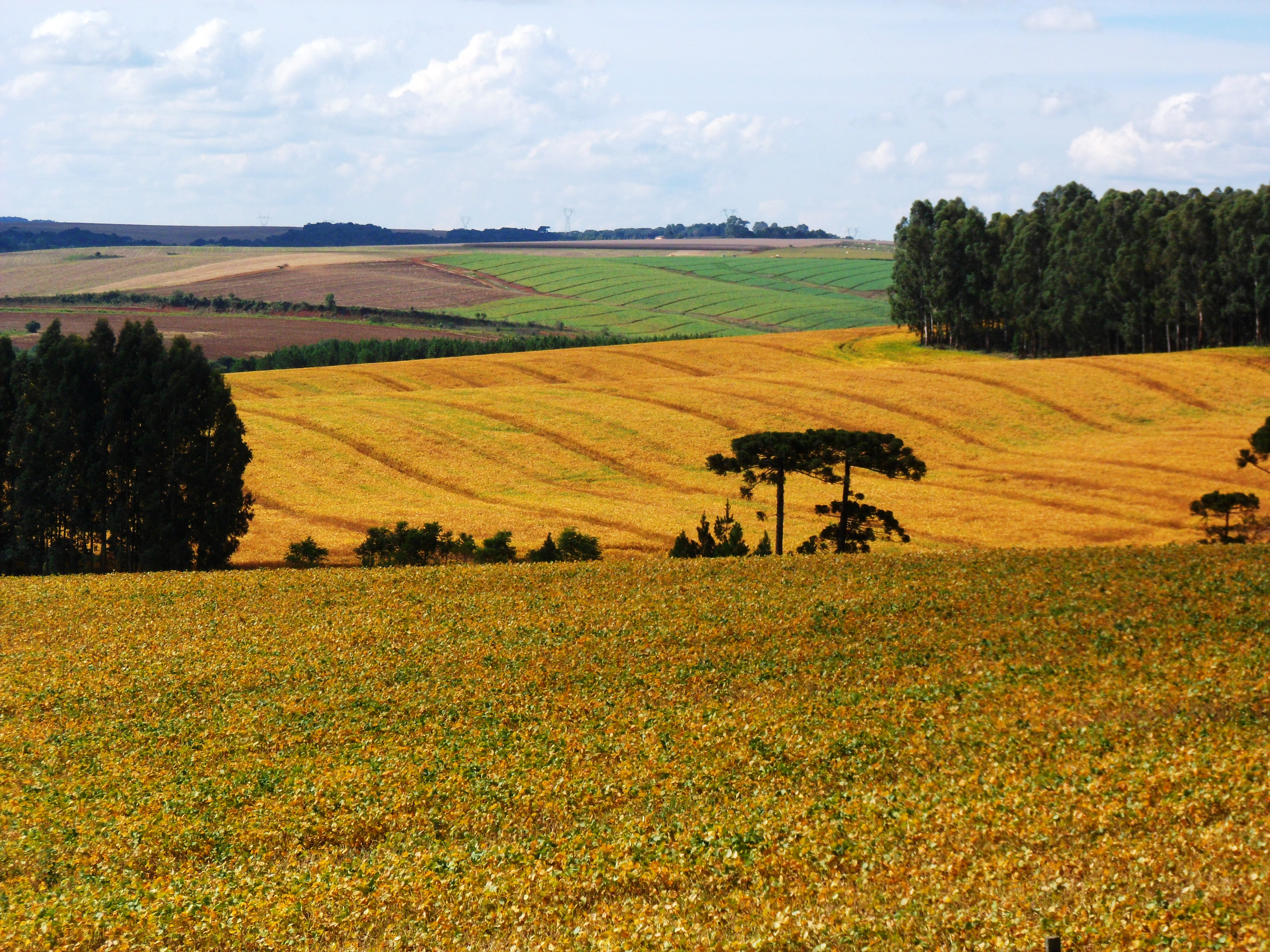
Soy plantation in Guarapuava

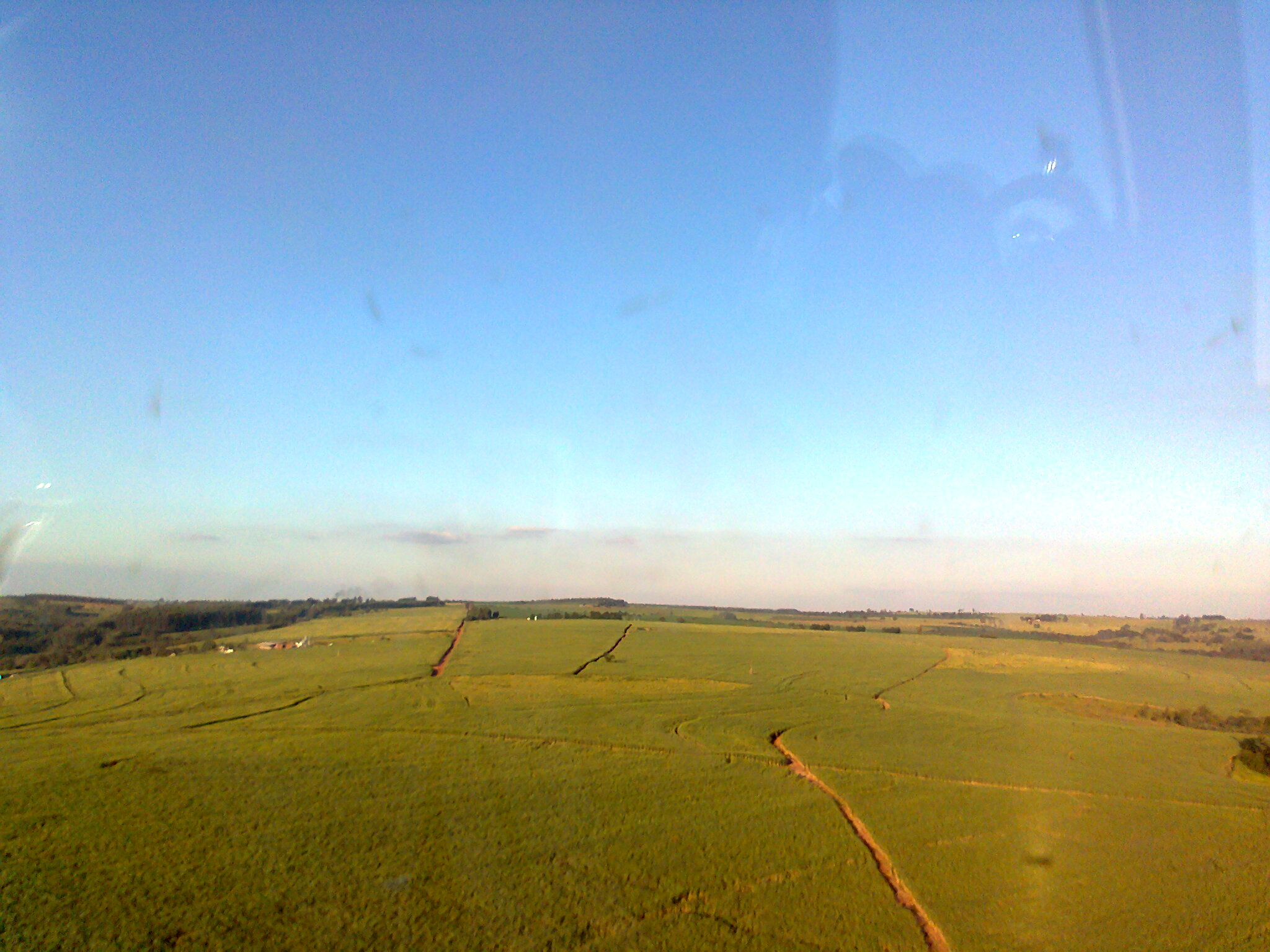
Sugarcane in Cianorte

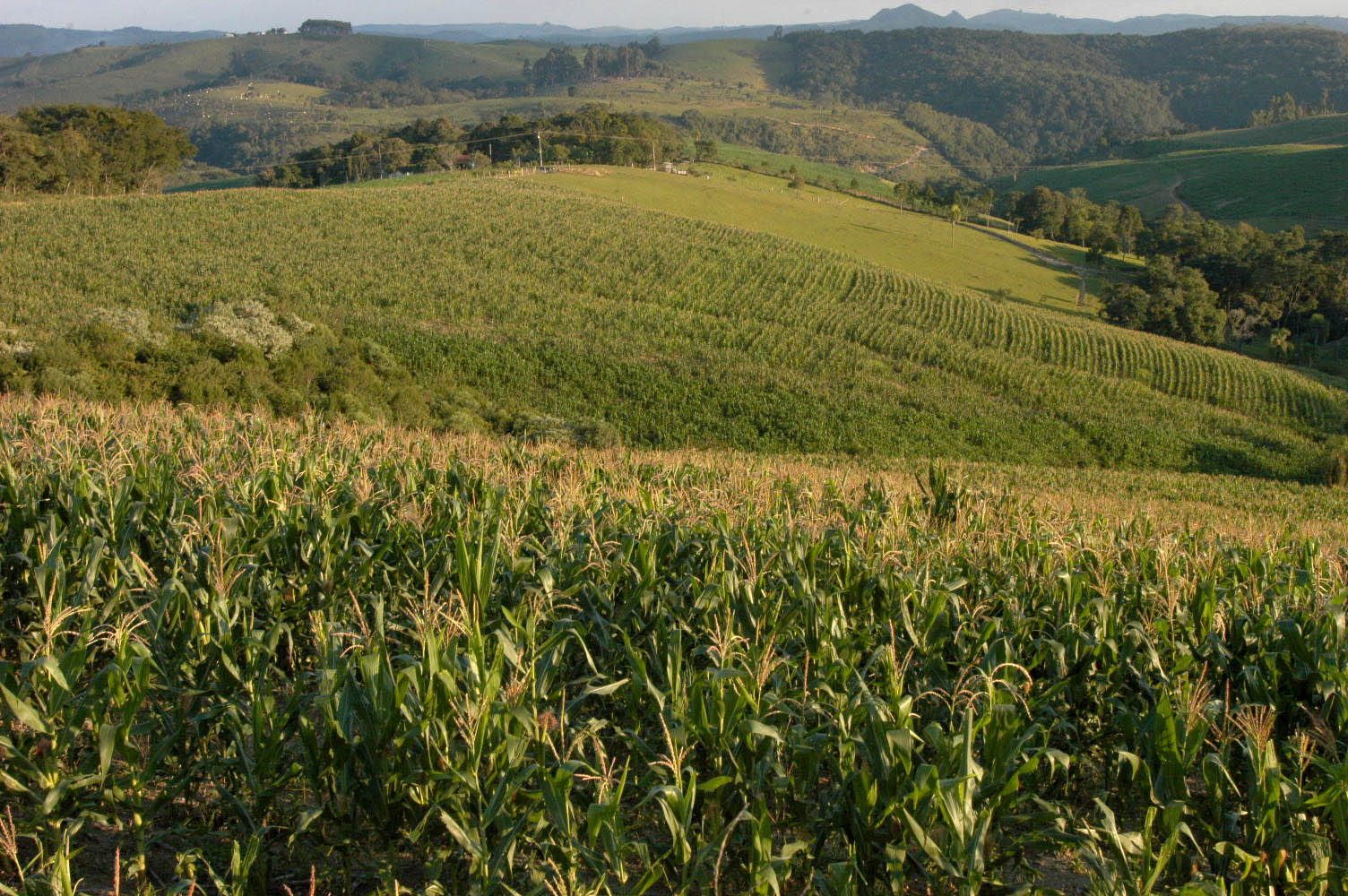
Corn plantation in Medianeira

In 2013, the Paraná had the fifth largest GDP of Brazil, representing 5.90% of the Brazilian GDP in 2005, against 6.4% in 2003.

About 15% of Paraná's GDP comes from agriculture. Another 40% comes from industry and the remaining 45% comes from the tertiary sector. As for its exports, in 2012 the main products exported were soybeans (18.73%), Meat Poultry (10.50%), sugar in Natura (8.09%), Soybean Meal (8.00%) and corn (6.36%). The state's largest company is the government-owned Copel, which supplies electricity, natural gas and other utilities to Paraná and some surrounding areas and in 1997 was among the first Brazilian companies to be listed on the New York Stock Exchange (ELP).

The main economic activities are agriculture, industry (agribusiness, automotive, and paper) and plant extraction (wood and yerba mate). Despite the good social indicators and high standard of living, unemployment is still a problem and the state is one of the most difficult for foreigners trying to find jobs.

=== Agriculture ===
In agriculture, the state stands out in the production of soybeans, maize, wheat, sugarcane, cassava, beans, tomato, orange and yerba mate, in addition to also producing coffee, oat, barley, peach, tangerine and strawberry.

In 2020, the South Region produced 32% of the national total of cereals, vegetables and oilseeds. There were 77.2 million tons, second place in Brazil, losing only to the Midwest. Paraná (14.9%) was the 2nd largest producer in the country.

In soy, Paraná is the 2nd largest producer in the country, with about 16% of national production. It produced 19.8 million tons in 2020. In 2017, it was also 2nd largest producer of maize (corn). Brazil is the biggest producer of soy and the 2nd biggest producer of corn in the world.

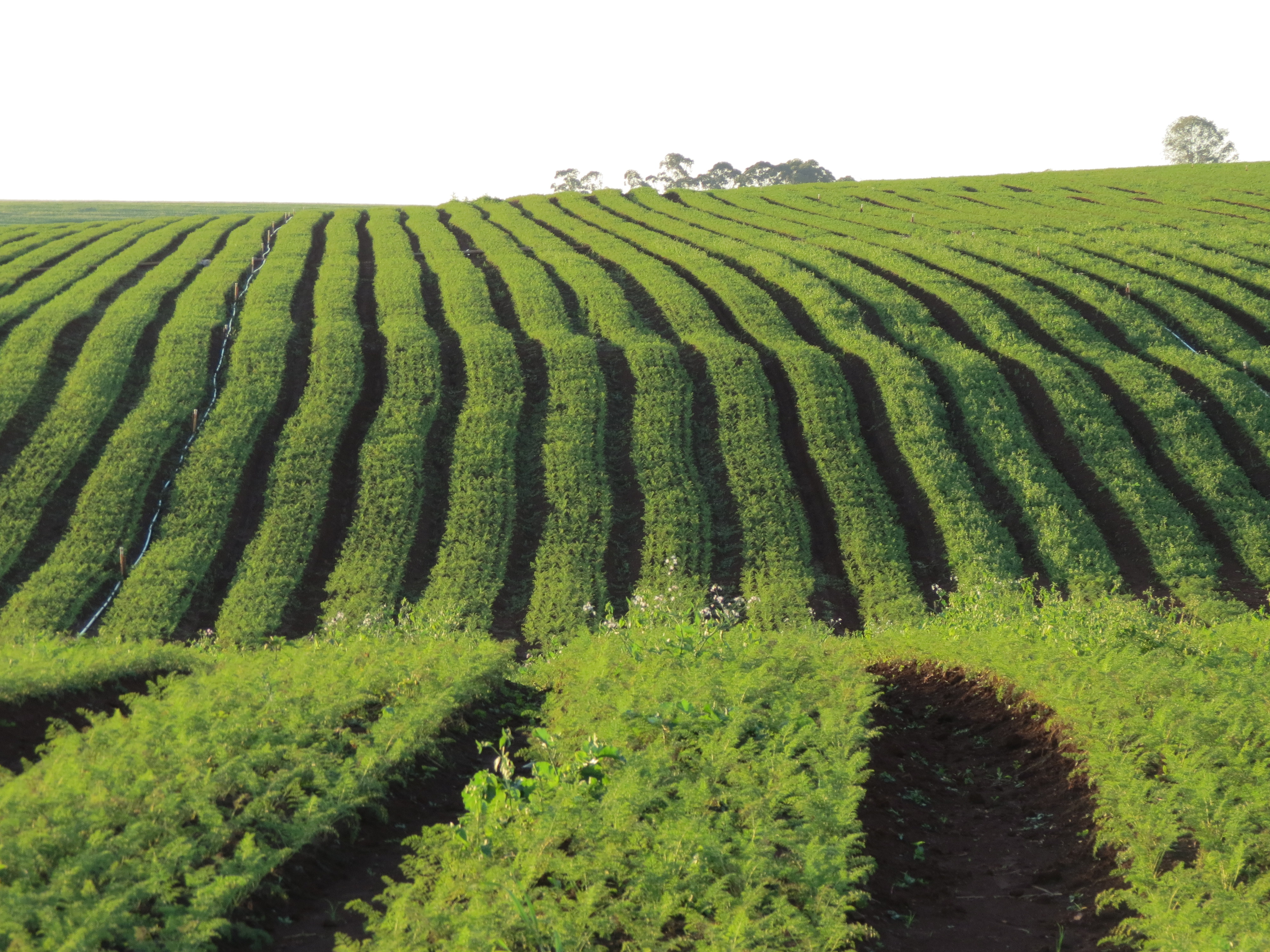
Carrot production in Paraná

Regarding sugarcane, Paraná was, in 2017, the fifth largest producer of cane, third of sugar and fifth of alcohol in the country. It harvested about 46 million tons of cane this year. The state's sugar and alcohol sector has 25 plants and employs around 55,000 people. The regions of Umuarama, Paranavaí, Maringá and Jacarezinho concentrate production. Brazil is the largest world producer, with 672.8 million tons harvested in 2018.

In cassava production, Brazil produced a total of 17.6 million tons in 2018. Paraná was the 2nd largest producer in the country, with 3.2 million tons.

Since 2006, Paraná has been leading the production of beans in Brazil. Brazil is the 3rd largest producer of beans in the world, with an annual harvest of around 3 million tons, 11% of world production. In 2018, the South Region was the main bean producer with 26.4% of the total, followed by the Midwest (25.4%), Southeast Region (25.1%), Northeast (20.6%) and North (2.5%). The State of Paraná leads the ranking of the main national producers with 18.9% of the total produced.

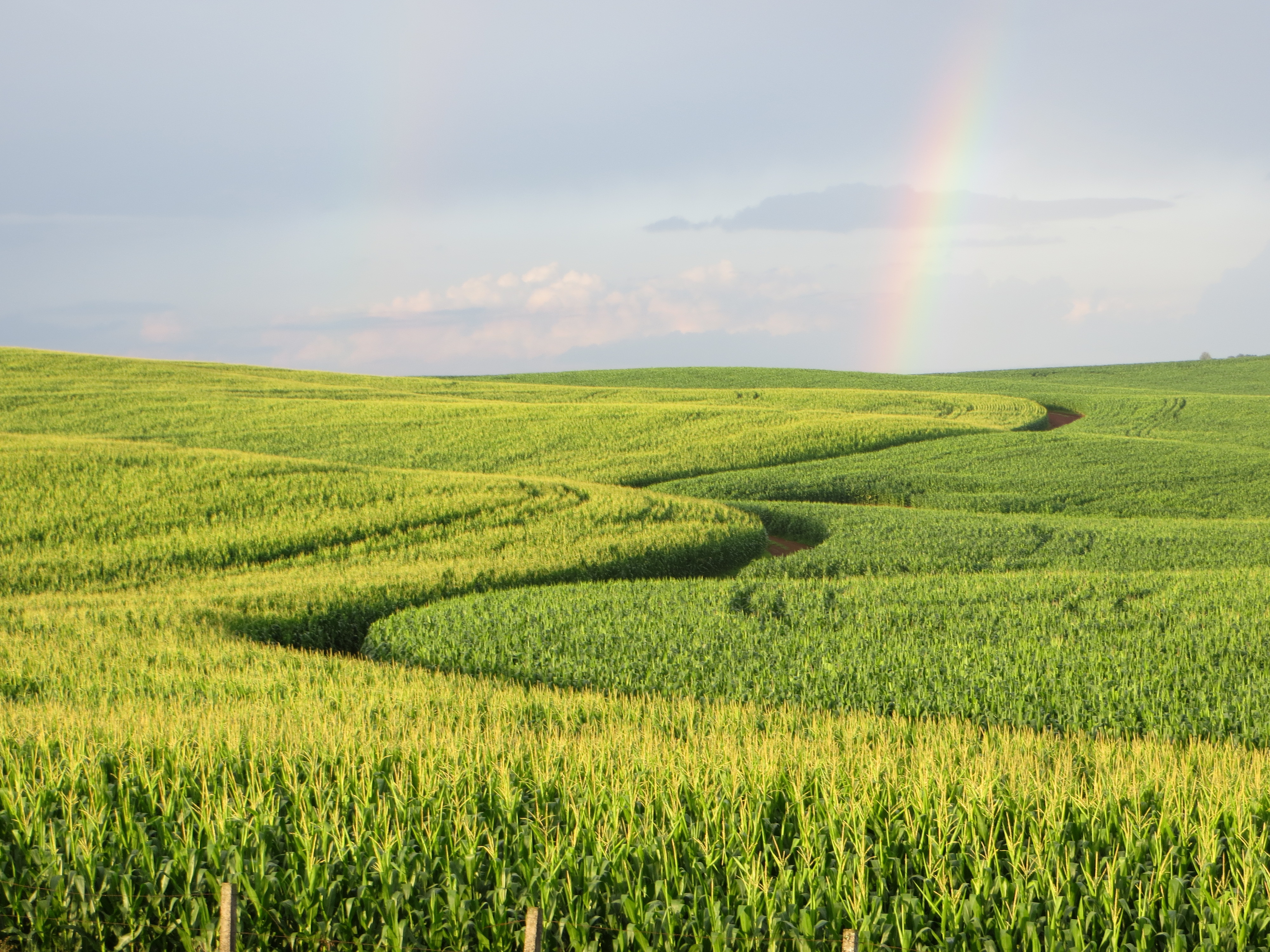
Wheat plantation in Paraná

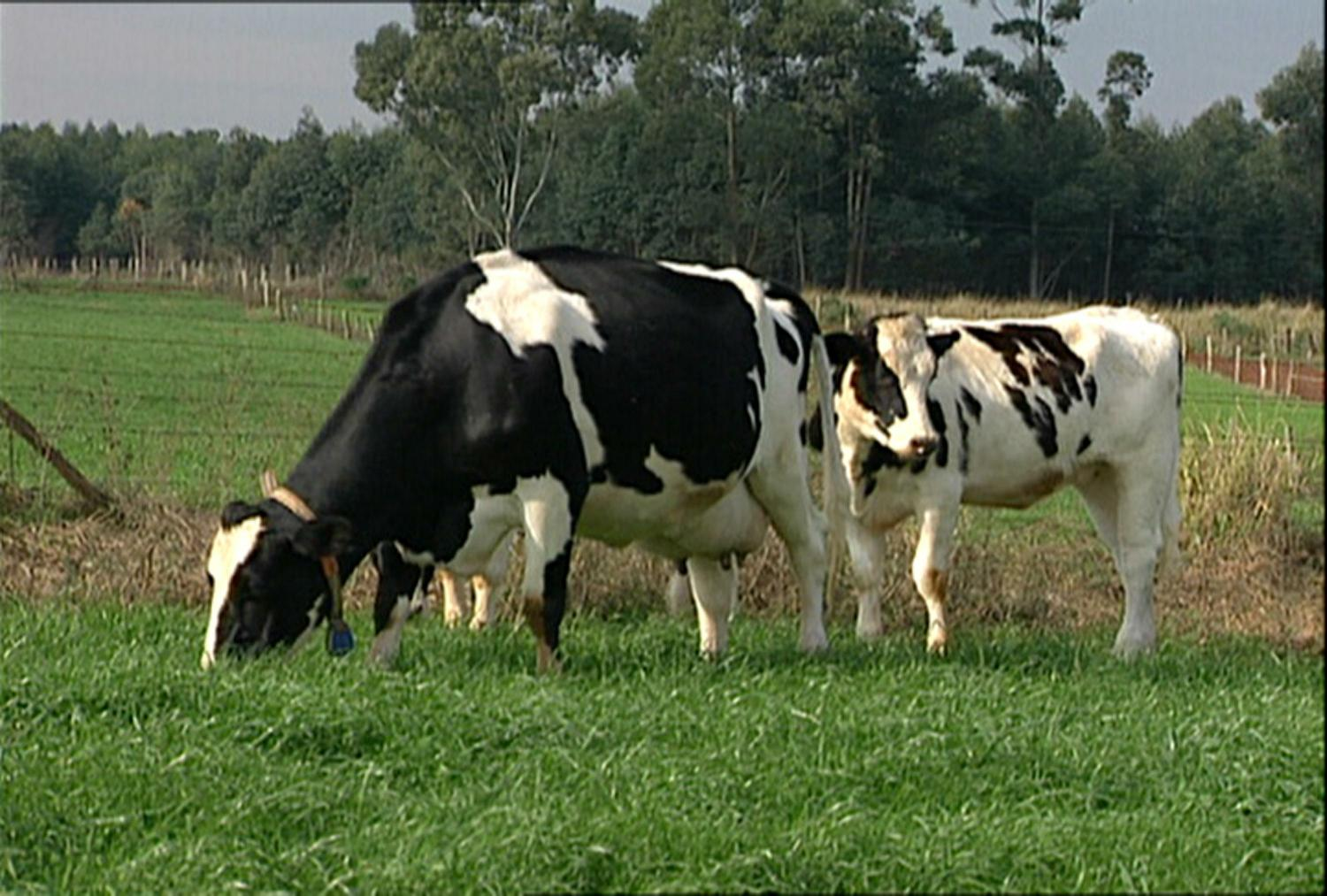
Dairy cattle in Palmeira

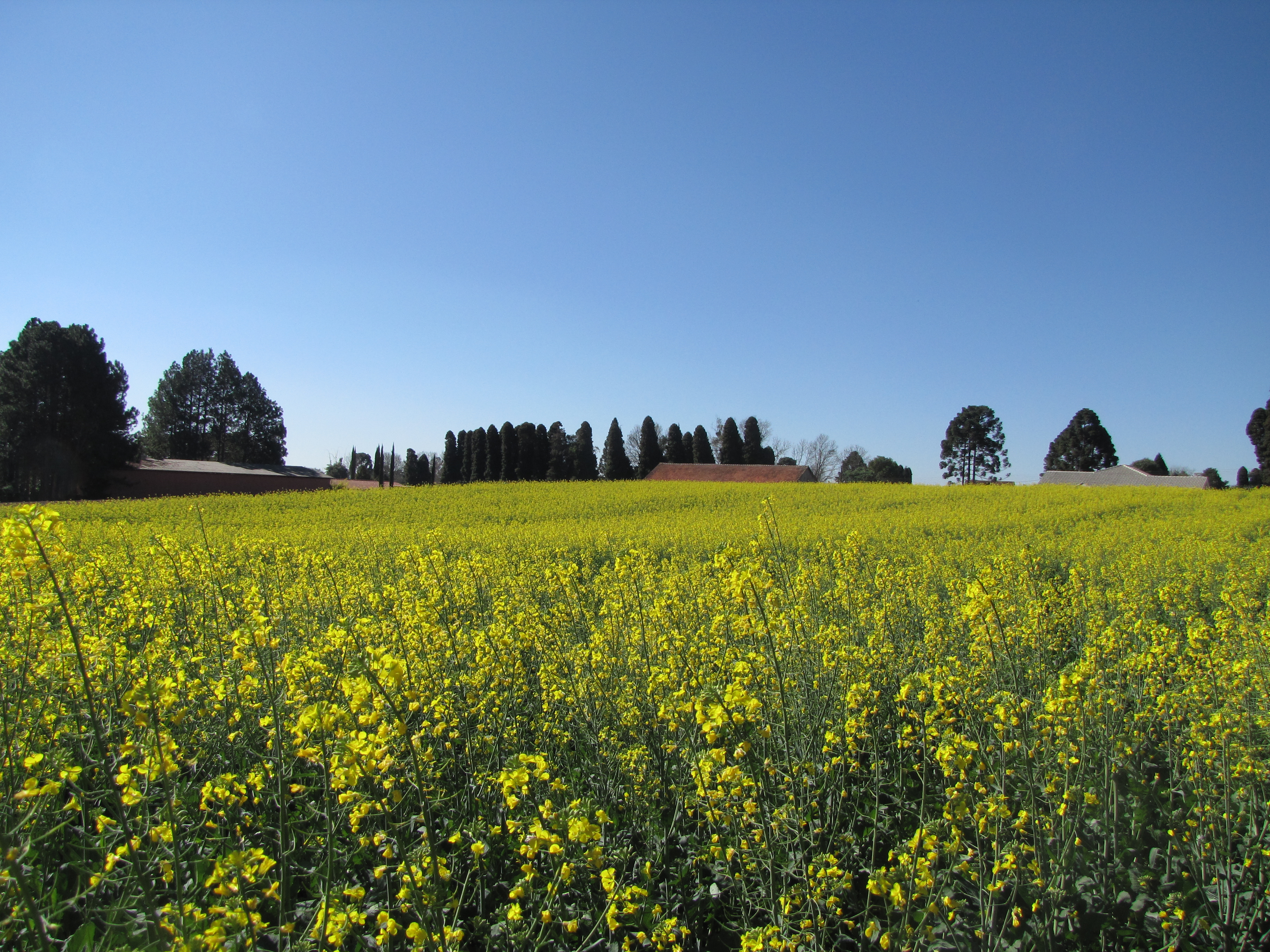
Canola field in Guarapuava

Paraná is the 2nd largest national producer of wheat, with 2.2 million tons in 2019, almost equal to Rio Grande do Sul, the biggest producer. The South Region is also the largest producer of oats in Brazil. In 2019, national production was close to 800 thousand tons, being almost all carried out in the South (Paraná and Rio Grande do Sul).

About orange, Paraná was the 3rd largest producer in Brazil in 2018, with a total of 834 thousand tons.

Although not a large production, Paraná is the Brazilian leader in the production of barley. The state harvested 219.2 thousand tons in 2019, 60% of the national production. However, Brazil is far from being self-sufficient in the production of barley. The Brazilian market consumes, on average, 1.5 million tons per year. Brazil produces 335 thousand tons, close to 22%. Most, 73%, come from Argentina and Uruguay.

In 2018, Paraná was the 4th largest produce of tangerine in Brazil. Paraná also has a part of the production of peaches in Brazil. In 2019, in Brazil, there was a total production area of around 4 thousand hectares of strawberry. Paraná was the 4th largest producers in the country.

In coffee, Paraná is the producer state located further south in the country. It was once the largest producing state in Brazil: in 1962, Paraná accounted for 58% of national production, but in 2017, it had only 2.7% of the total produced in the country. The coffee culture has been replaced by other planting crops, and the state's focus today has been to invest in special, more expensive coffee beans.

In 2019, Brazil produced about 900 thousand tons of yerba mate annually, according to the IBGE. Paraná is the largest producer in volume and Rio Grande do Sul in plantation areas (and where the sector is more industrialized). According to 2017 data, Paraná harvested 301 thousand tons of yerba mate by extractive method, and 237 thousand tons in plantation. The productive potential of yerba mate is still little explored in Brazil, with a good part of the harvest carried out by the extractive system and with low levels of productivity. However, many new producers are adopting more professional and efficient production systems, with technical acuity of management and globalized market vision. This tends to increase Brazil's export of this product.

In 2017, the state's cattle herd was 9.3 million head, 10th place in the country.

In 2018, Paraná produced a total of 4.4 billion liters of milk, making it the 2nd largest producer in the country. The city of Castro was the largest producer in the country in 2018, with 292 million liters of milk.

In pork, the 3 southern states are the largest producers in the country. Brazil had 41.1 million head in 2017. Paraná (17.2%) is the 2nd largest producer.

The Brazilian poultry flock, in 2018, was of the order of 1.5 billion heads. In 2017, the biggest poultry producing state in Brazil was Paraná (25.3%). In terms of chickens, in 2017 there were 242.8 million heads in the country. Among the states that were the largest producers, São Paulo led with 21.9%, followed by Paraná (10.1%). In the production of chicken eggs, the state ranks 2nd in Brazil, with 9,6% of national production.

In fish farming, western Paraná, in municipalities close to Toledo and Cascavel, has become the largest fish-producing region in the country, with tilapia as the main cultivated species. The west represents 69% of all production in Paraná, the largest national producer, with 112 thousand tons. Of this amount, 91% refer to tilapia breeding.

The South region was the main producer of honey in the country in 2017, accounting for 39.7% of the national total. Paraná was the 2nd largest producer in the country, with 14.3%.

=== Manufacturing Industry ===
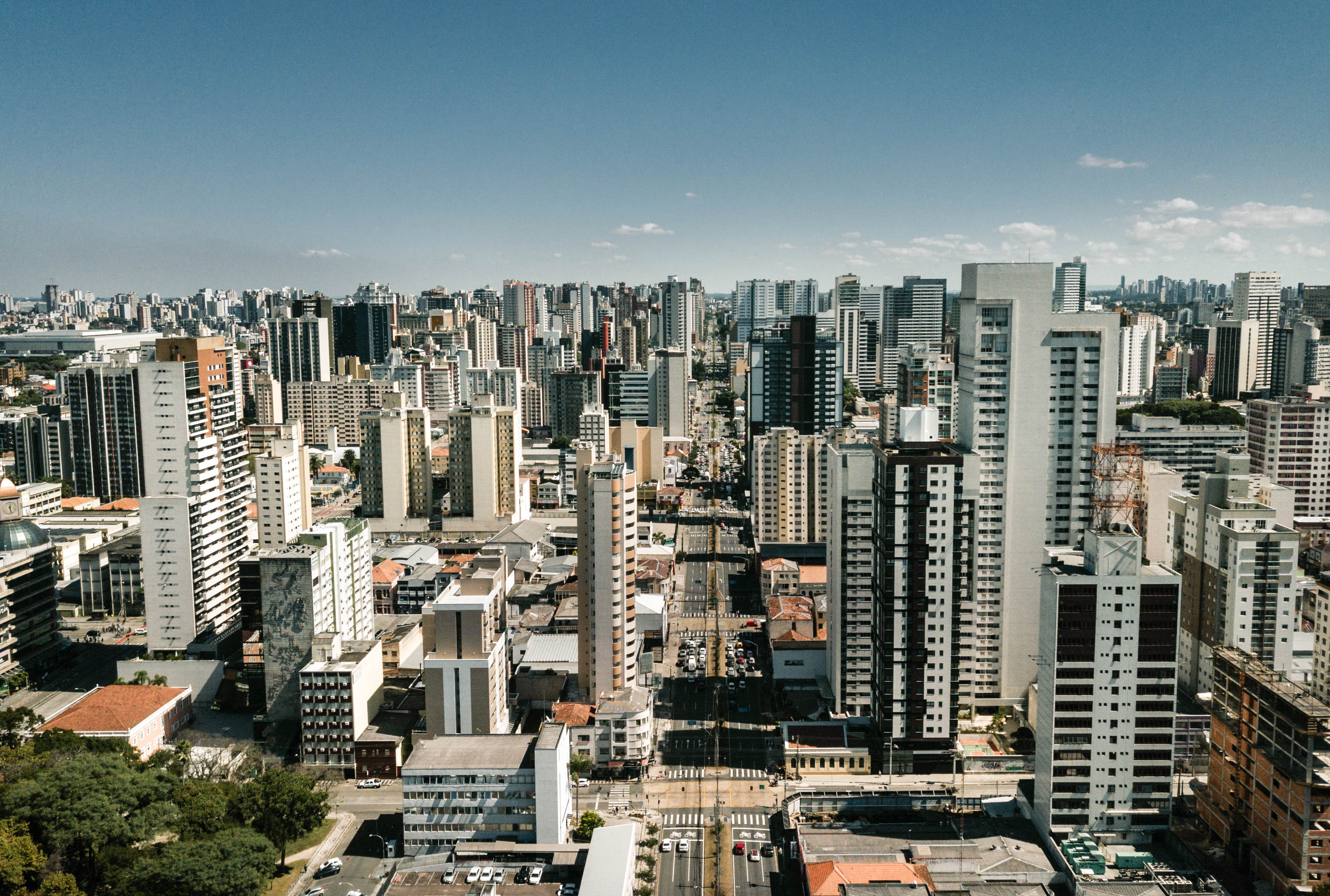
Downtown Curitiba

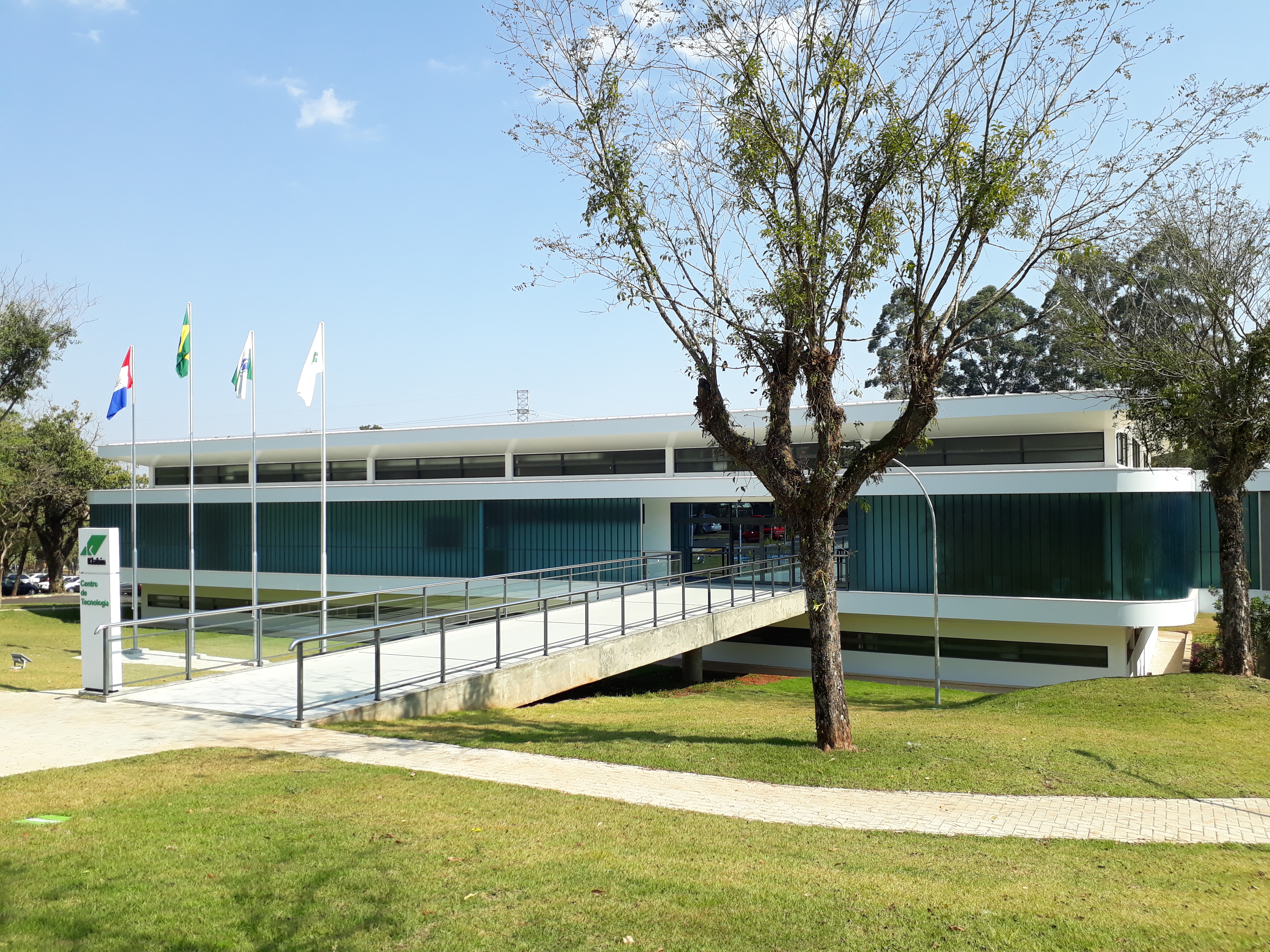
Klabin Technology complex in Telêmaco Borba

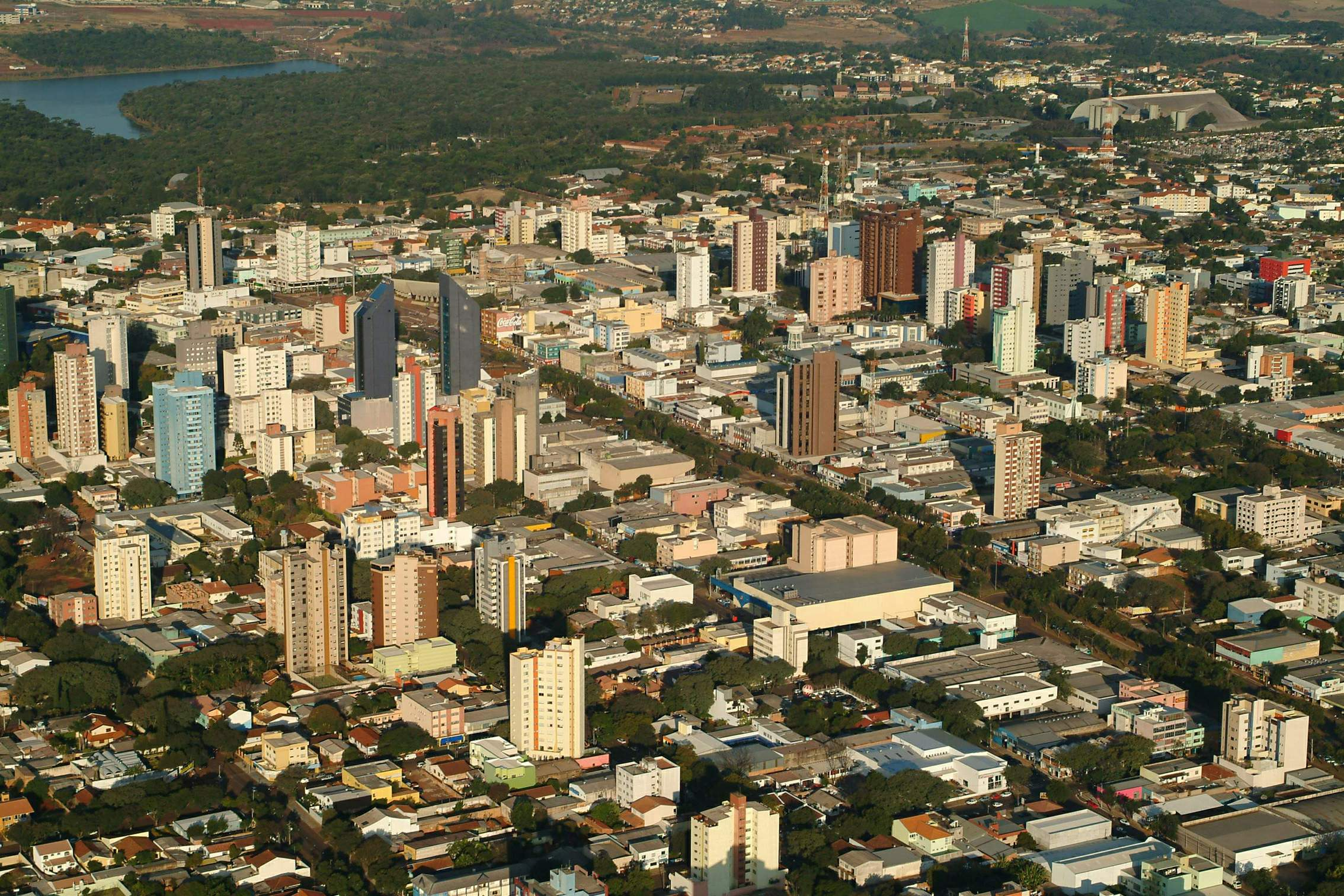
Cascavel is the fifth most populous city in the state

About industry, Paraná had an industrial GDP of R $92.8 billion in 2017, equivalent to 7.8% of the national industry. It employs 763,064 workers in the industry. The main industrial sectors are: Food (19.1%), Industrial Services of Public Utility, such as Electricity and Water (18.5%), Construction (17.3%), Motor Vehicles (8.1%), and Petroleum Derivatives and Biofuels (5.7%). These 5 sectors concentrate 68.7% of the state's industry.

In Brazil, the automotive sector represents close to 22% of industrial GDP. In 2019 the state came 2nd in national vehicle production, with a share of 15%. The state has Volkswagen, Renault, Audi, Volvo and DAF plants.

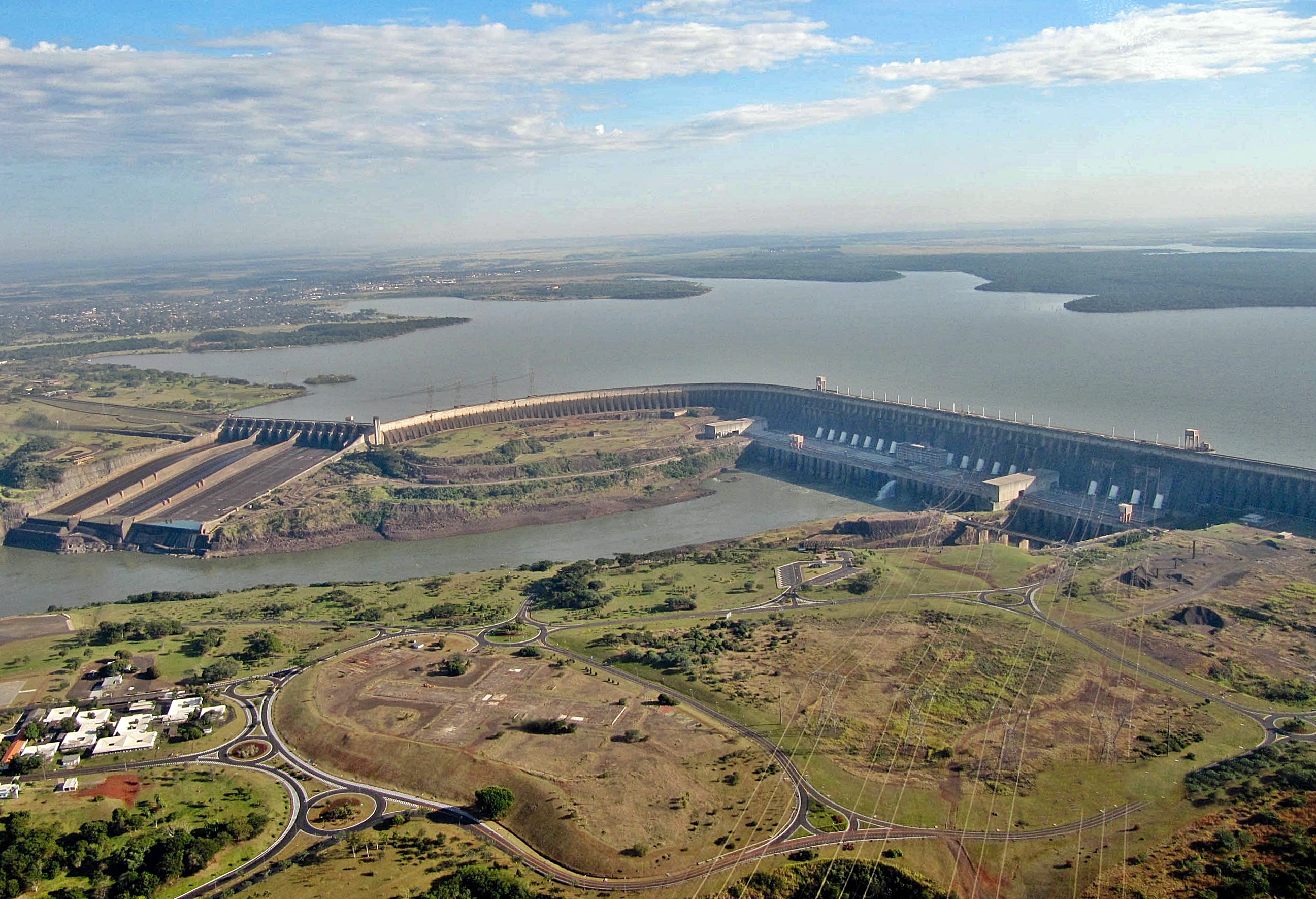
Itaipu Dam in Foz do Iguaçú

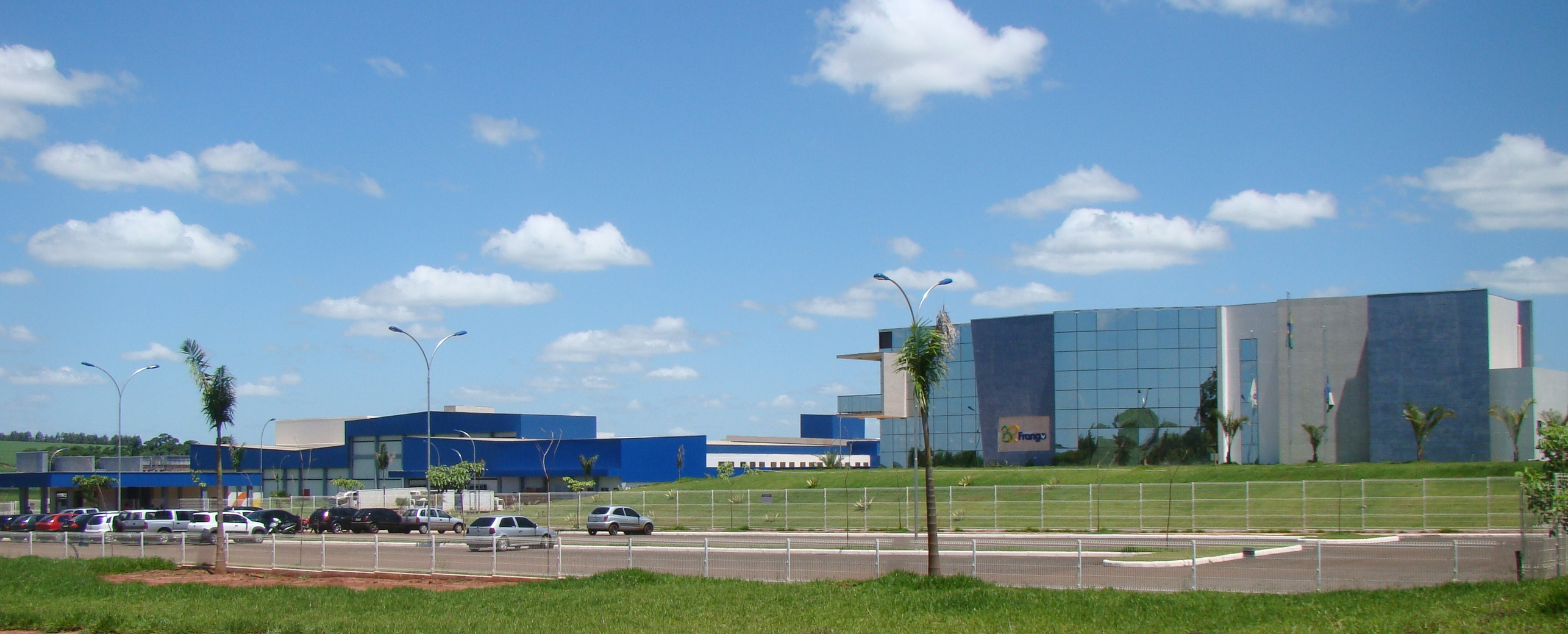
Food company BR Frango in Santo Inácio

In the paper and cellulose sector, Brazilian pulp production was 19.691 million tons in 2019. The country exported US$7.48 billion in pulp this year, US$3.25 billion only to China. Brazilian forest-based industry exports totaled US$9.7 billion (US$7.48 billion in cellulose, US$2 billion in paper and US$265 million in wood panels). Paper production was 10.535 million tons in 2019. The country exported 2.163 million tons. In 2016, the paper and cellulose industry in the South of the country represented 33% of the national total. This year, Paraná was the national leader in the production of roundwood (mainly eucalyptus) for the pulp and paper industry (15.9 million m^{3}); Brazil was the second country that produced the most cellulose in the world and the eighth in the production of paper. The city that most produced these woods in Brazil was Telêmaco Borba (PR), and the 5th largest was Ortigueira (PR). In 2016, the top five states producing logs for paper and cellulose (mainly eucalyptus) were: Paraná (15.9 million m^{3}), São Paulo (14.7 million m^{3}), Bahia (13.6 million m^{3}), Mato Grosso do Sul (9.9 million m^{3}) and Minas Gerais (7.8 million m^{3}). Together, they correspond to 72.7% of the national production of 85.1 million m^{3}. The ten largest producing municipalities had 22.9% of the country's production. They were the cities of Telêmaco Borba (PR), Três Lagoas (MS), Caravelas (BA), Mucuri (BA), Ortigueira (PR), São Mateus (ES), Dom Eliseu (PR), Nova Viçosa (BA), Water Clara (MS) and Ribas do Rio Pardo (MS).

Paraná is the largest producer of oil shale in Brazil. In the city of São Mateus do Sul, there is a Petrobras plant specialized in the production of the material. Approximately 7,800 tons are processed daily.

In Food industry, In 2019, Brazil was the 2nd largest exporter of processed foods in the world, with a value of U $34.1 billion in exports. The Brazilian food and beverage industry's revenue in 2019 was R $699.9 billion, 9.7% of the country's Gross Domestic Product. In 2015, the industrial food and beverage sector in Brazil comprised 34,800 companies (not counting bakeries), the vast majority of which were small. These companies employed more than 1,600,000 workers, making the food and beverage industry the largest employer in the manufacturing industry. There are around 570 large companies in Brazil, which concentrate a good part of the total industry revenue. Paraná created food companies of national importance such as Frimesa, C.Vale, Nutrimental, Copacol, Coopavel and Matte Leão.

In the electronics industry, the turnover of industries in Brazil reached R $153.0 billion in 2019, about 3% of the national GDP. The number of employees in the sector was 234.5 thousand people. Exports were US$5.6 billion, and the country's imports were US$32.0 billion. Brazil, despite its efforts over the decades to get rid of the dependence on technology imports, has not yet managed to reach this level. Imports are concentrated in expensive components, such as processors, microcontrollers, memories, under-mounted magnetic disks, lasers, LED and LCD. Cables for telecommunication and electricity distribution, wires, optical fibers and connectors are manufactured in the country. Brazil has two large electro-electronic production hubs, located in the Metropolitan Region of Campinas, in the State of São Paulo, and in Free Economic Zone of Manaus, in the State of Amazonas. There are large internationally renowned technology companies, as well as part of the industries that participate in its supply chain. The country also has other smaller centers, and one of them is at Curitiba, capital of Paraná. The technological center of Curitiba has companies such as Siemens and Positivo Informatics. 87 companies and 16,000 employees work at Tecnoparque, an area of 127,000 m^{2} created by state law in 2007. Tecnoparque can grow up to 400,000 m^{2} with up to four times the number of workers it has today, reaching 68 thousand people.

In the household appliances industry, sales of whitegoods (refrigerators, air conditioners, etc.) were 12.9 million units in 2017. The sector had its peak sales in 2012, with 18.9 million units. The biggest-selling brands were Brastemp, Electrolux, Consul and Philips. Brastemp is originally from São Bernardo do Campo-SP. Consul is originally from Santa Catarina, having merged with Brastemp and today being part of the multinational Whirlpool Corporation. Another famous Brazilian brand was Prosdócimo, founded in Curitiba, which was sold to Electrolux.

In the small appliances sector, Paraná has one of the famous companies: Britânia, originally from Curitiba.

== Infrastructure ==
=== Roads ===
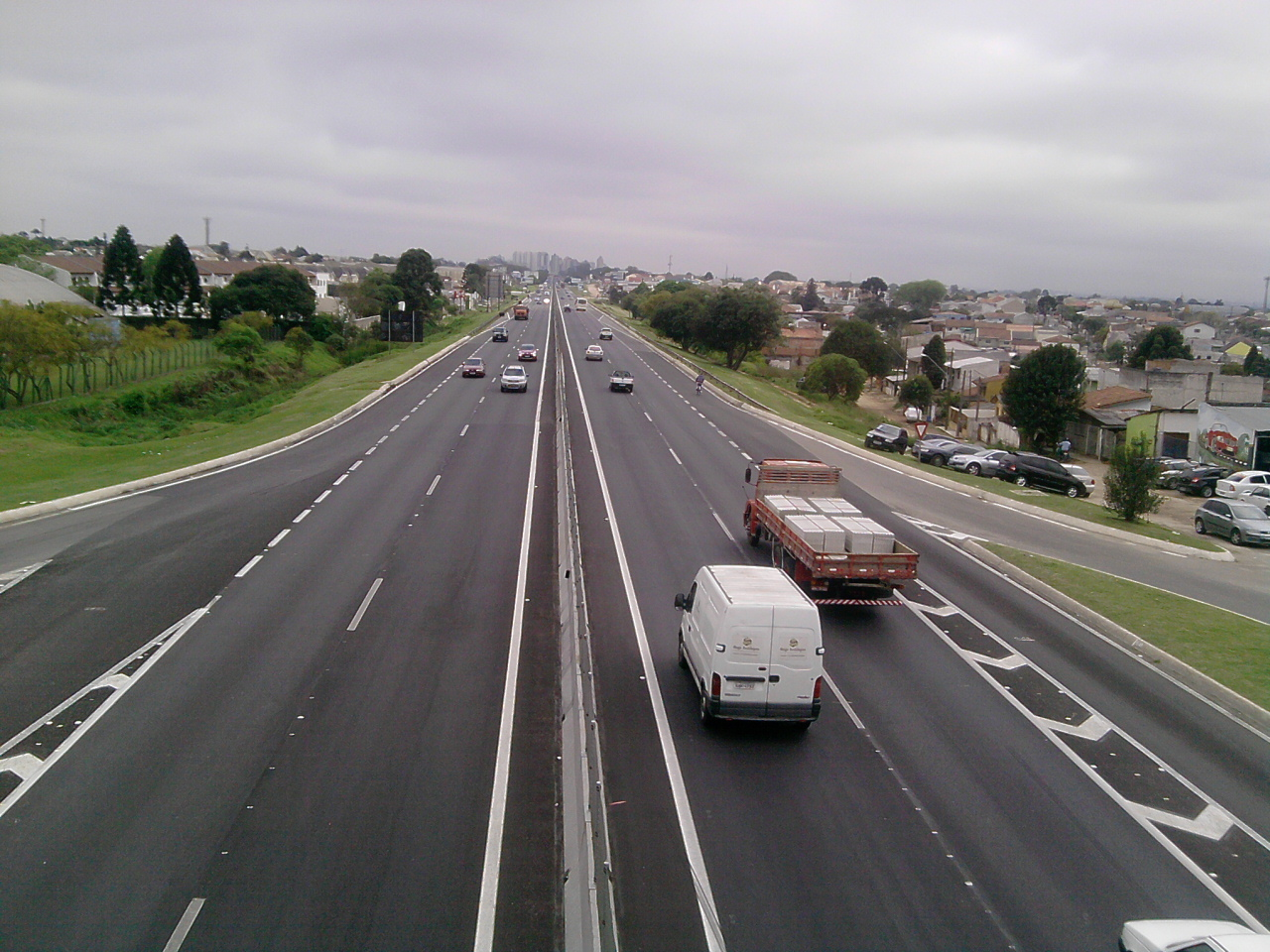
BR-277 Highway

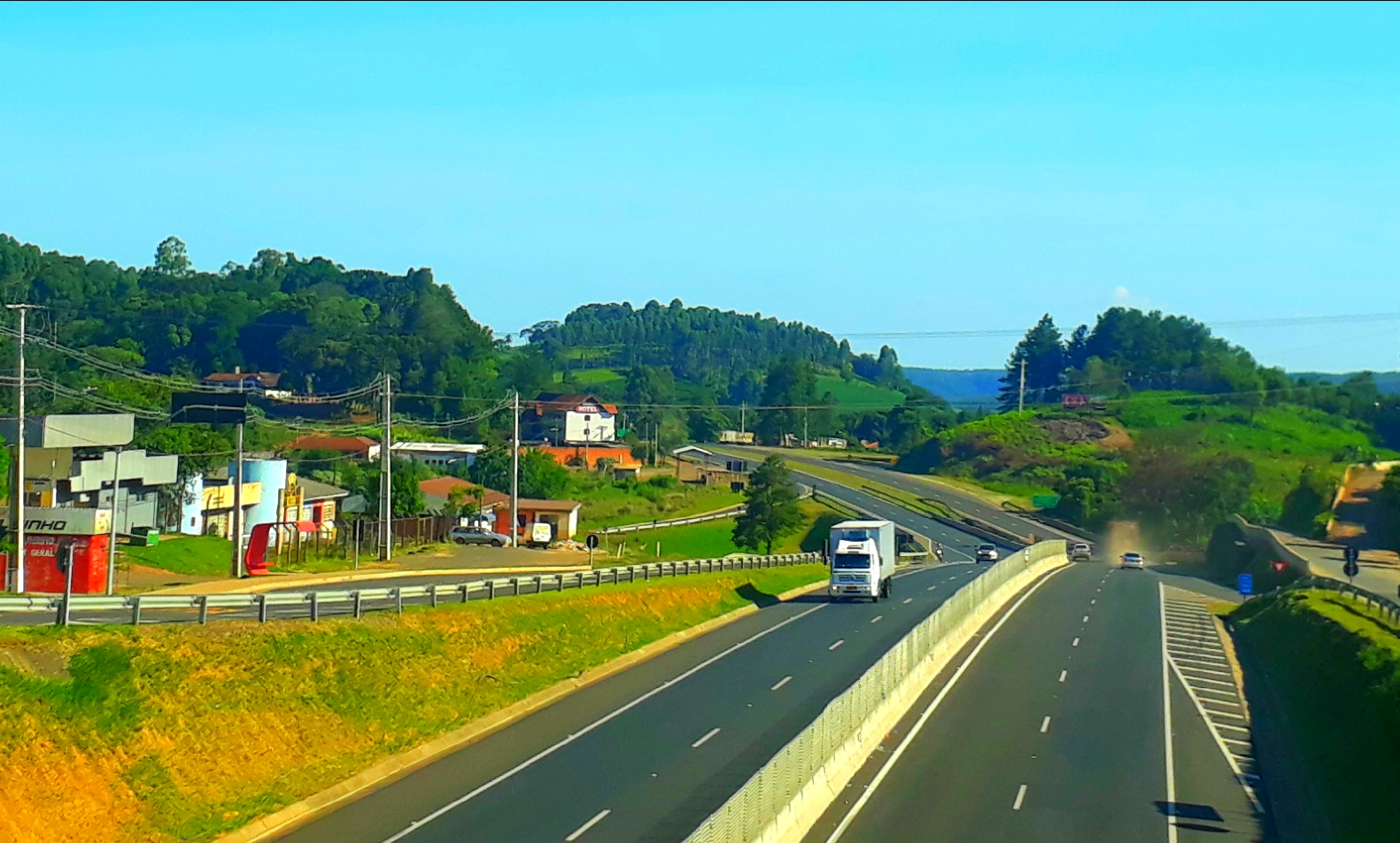
BR-376

In 2021, Paraná had 120,930 km of highways, 21,173 km of which were paved, and of these, 1,475 km were duplicated highways.

There is currently a project to grant the main highways in the state (BR-369, BR-376, BR-277 and some others) to the private sector in a large project to double 1,782 km of highways, among other improvement works.

The capital, Curitiba, has a ring road around the city, incomplete only because the northern part (the least populated in the region) has not yet been built.

=== International airports ===
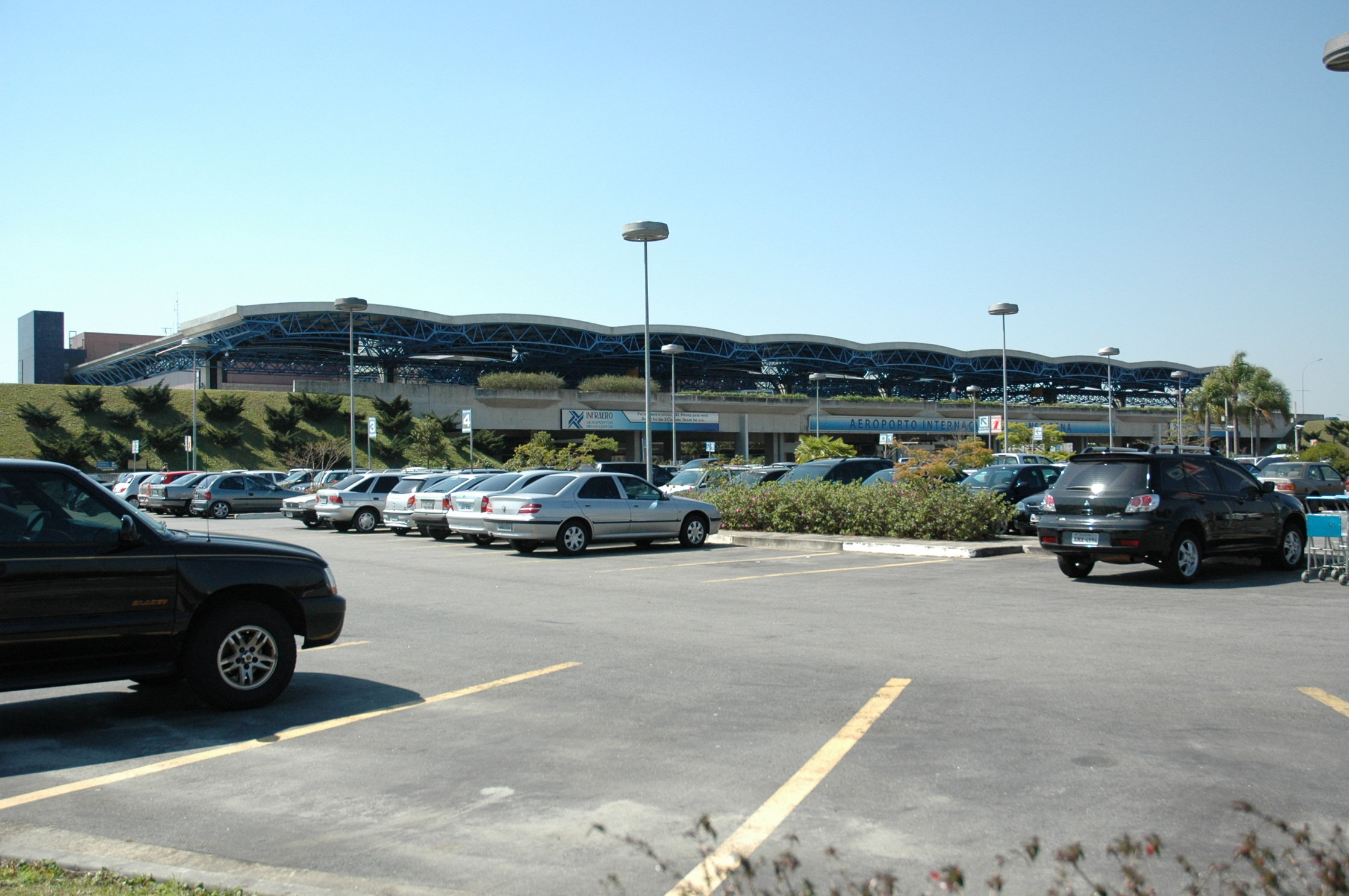
Afonso Pena International Airport

The state has several airports, the main ones being:

- Afonso Pena International Airport is Curitiba's main airport. It is located in the nearby city of São José dos Pinhais.
- Foz do Iguaçu International Airport;
- Londrina Airport;
- Cascavel Airport;
- Maringá Regional Airport.

The height of air transport in the state was in 1957, when 31 cities were served by flights.

=== Ports ===
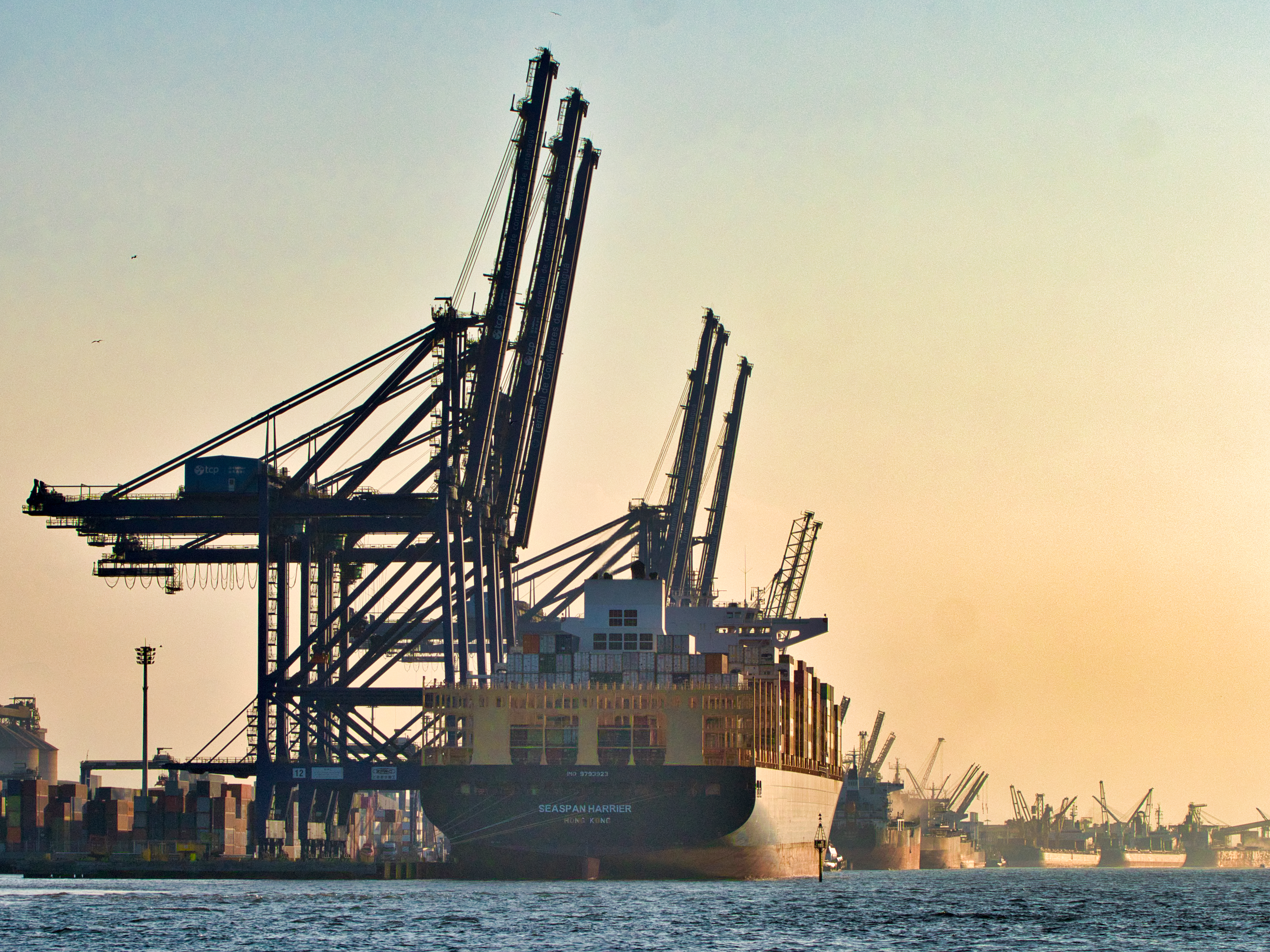
Port of Paranaguá

Paraná has the Port of Paranaguá, one of the main ones in the country, which, in 2021, handled 56 million tons of cargo. There is also the Port of Antonina, which, in 2021, handled 1.5 million tons of cargo.

Much of the production from Mato Grosso do Sul, Mato Grosso, Santa Catarina, Rio Grande do Sul, Minas Gerais, São Paulo and even Paraguay is shipped to the Port of Paranaguá for export by sea. Many railroads serve Paranaguá, among the main ones are the Ferroeste, Malha Sul and the Curitiba-Paranaguá Railroad.

== Sports ==
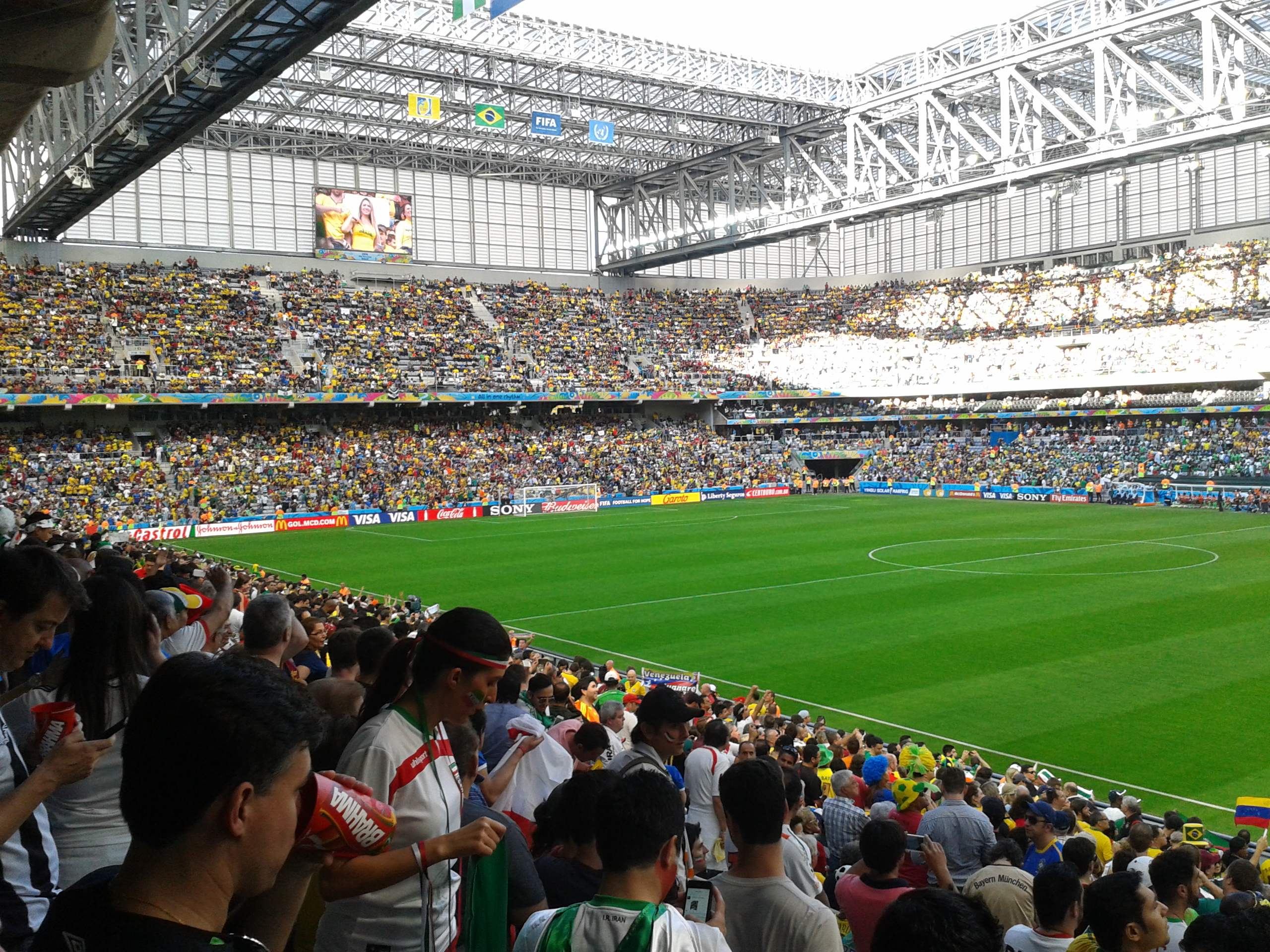
Arena da Baixada during the match between Iran and Nigeria during the 2014 FIFA World Cup

Two of the biggest football teams in the state are Club Athletico Paranaense and Coritiba Foot Ball Club, who play the Atletiba derby. Curitiba was one of the 12 host cities of the 2014 FIFA World Cup.

In the state, the following Olympic medalists were born: Vanderlei Cordeiro de Lima and Édson Ribeiro in athletics; Natália Falavigna in taekwondo; Douglas Vieira in judo; Cyro Delgado in swimming; Giba, Serginho, Elisângela Oliveira and Filó in volleyball; Emanuel Rego in beach volleyball; in addition to World Championships medalists such as Jadel Gregório in athletics and Amanda, Karol Souza and Mayara Moura in handball.

== See also ==
- List of municipalities in Paraná
- Mining in Paraná
- Military Police of Paraná State
- Vitiviniculture in Paraná
- Culture of Paraná
