= Universidade Positivo =

Private university in Curitiba, Brazil

Coordinates: 25°26′48″S 49°21′31″W

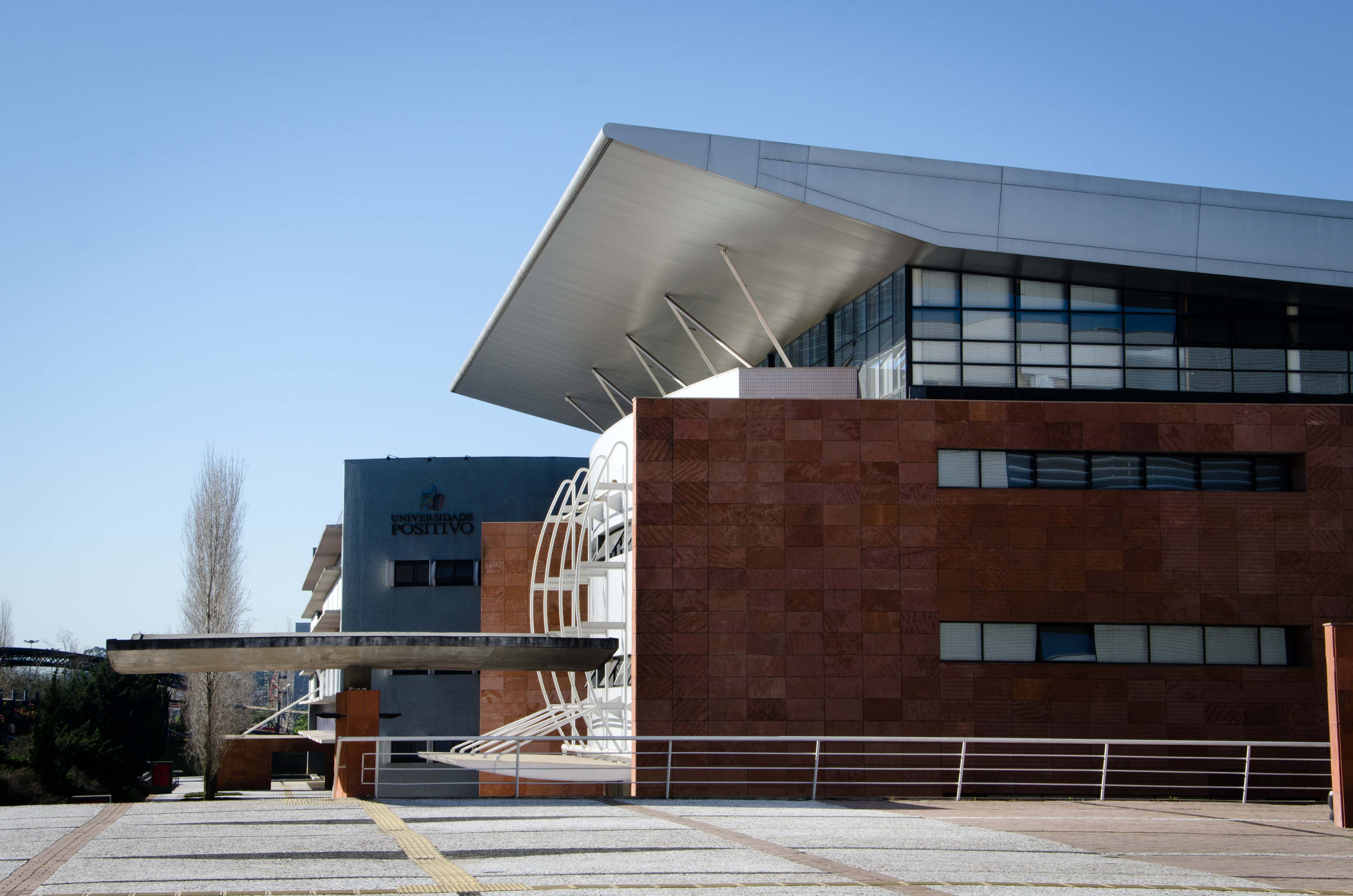
- University library
- Type: Private
- Established: 1988
- Founders: Oriovisto Guimarães
- Rector: José Pio Martins
- Location: Curitiba, Paraná, Brazil
- Campus: Urban
- Website: www.up.edu.br

Universidade Positivo (abbreviated UP) is a private university in the State of Paraná, Brazil.

== Campus ==
Universidade Positivo's campus is in the Campo Comprido district of Curitiba and occupies an area of more than 400,000 m^{2}

== Courses ==
Universidade Positivo offered (as of beginning of 2013) 27 undergraduate programs, more than 50 postgraduate programs, four master's degree programs, and two doctoral programs.

As of summer of 2020, the university offered more than 60 Undergraduate courses, hundreds of Specialization and MBA programs, seven Master's and Doctorate programs, as well as continuing education courses and extension programs. Also, it has seven free service clinics.

Its library can host up to 865 people. Its collection consists of nearly 115,000 volumes. In a special room the library houses the personal collection of the late cabinet minister, diplomat and professor, Roberto de Oliveira Campos. It includes diplomas, medals and awards, in addition to its 8,426 volumes.
