= Sardinian surnames =

Sardinian family names

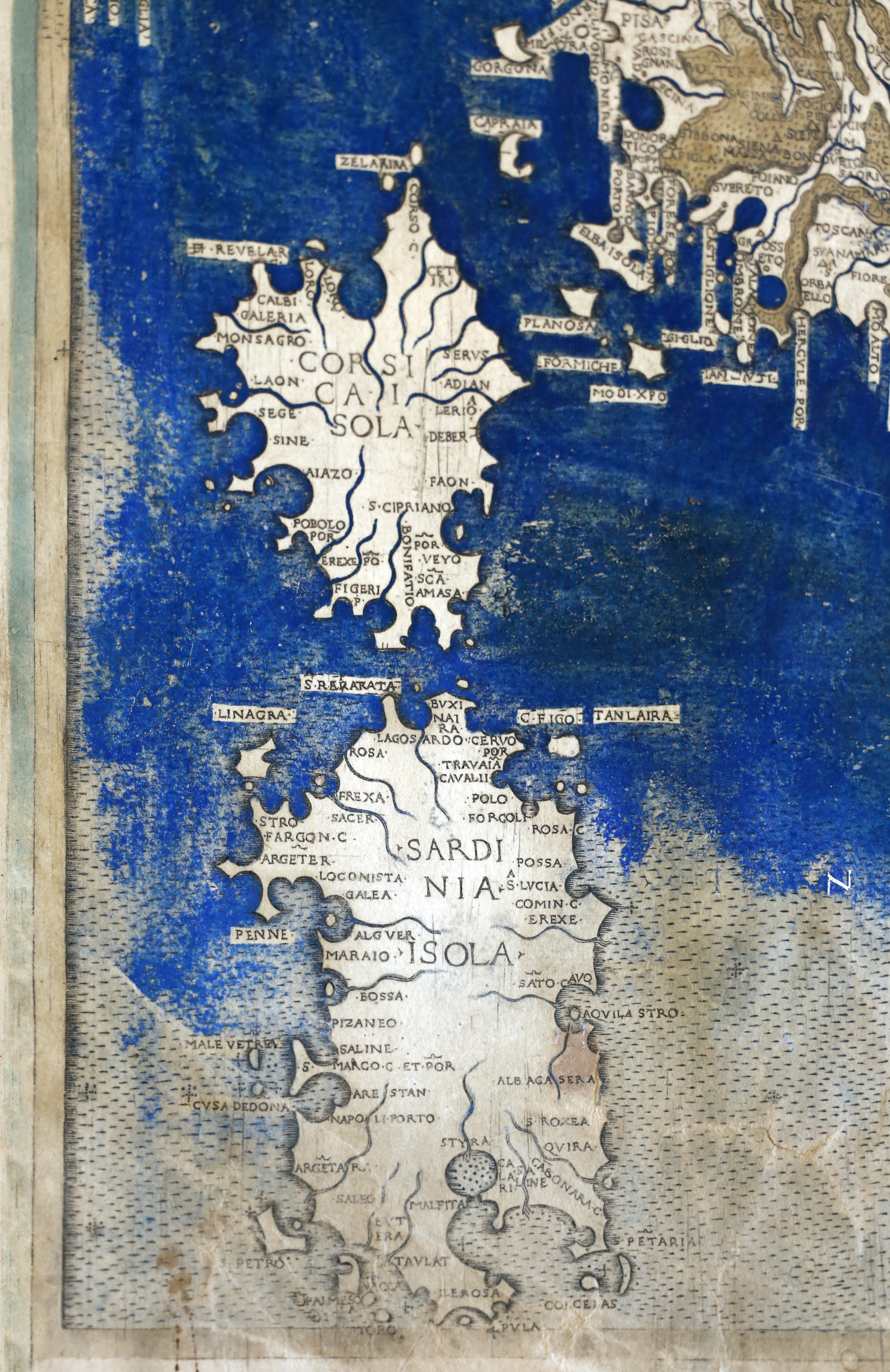
The islands of Sardinia and Corsica, depicted by Francesco Berlinghieri

Sardinian surnames are surnames with origins from the Sardinian language or a long, identifiable tradition on the Western Mediterranean island of Sardinia.

== History ==
=== Oldest records ===
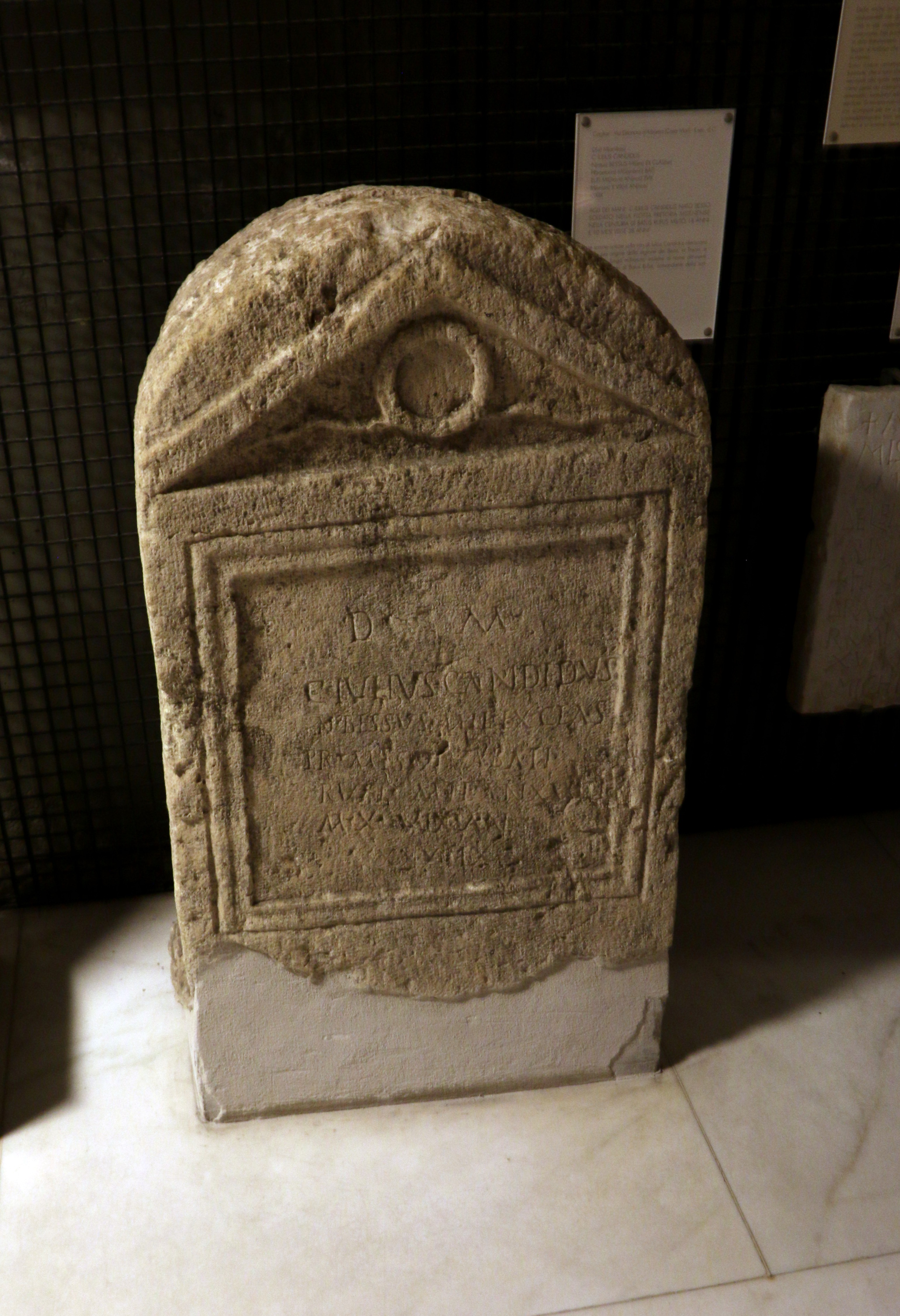
Caius Iulius Candidus' funerary stele, II century A.D., National Archaeological Museum of Cagliari

In Roman epigraphs from Sardinia, onomastics sometimes appear that would later come back in medieval and/or modern times. We mention for example: Torbenius Kariti (CIL, X, 7876) that reverberates in the medieval Torbenio / Torbeni / Torbini / Turbini / Dorbeni; Monioritinus (CIL, X, 7877), related to the surname Moni / Monni; Baris / Barix and the medieval Barisone / Parisone; Valeria Amoccada to today's surname Mocco; Ietoccor Torceri filius to the medieval Ithoccor and today's Stoccoro.

=== Medieval and Early modern records ===
Witnesses of this exchange carried out with good and mutual agreement: donno Trogodori Corsu de facto curator of Bonarcado, and Torbini de Piras head of the circumscription, and Goantine de Baniu cleric and Petru Marki cleric of Solarussa, and Petru d'Ardaule cleric, and Petru Contu and Goantine de Rue and Tericu Maiu and Taniel Kerssa and Petru Coco and Benzivenni and Petru Manis.

— Medieval Sardinian surnames in the Condaghe of Bonarcado, 12th-13th century

Among the most valuable sources for the study of ancient Sardinian onomastics are the condaghes, administrative registers of the Sardinian Judicates dating back to the 11th-13th centuries, as well as the Ultima Pax Sardiniae, a 1388 peace treaty between John I of Aragon and Eleanor of Arborea, in which most of today's Sardinian surnames can be found, often written with a slightly different spelling (e.g. De Thori, today Dettori).

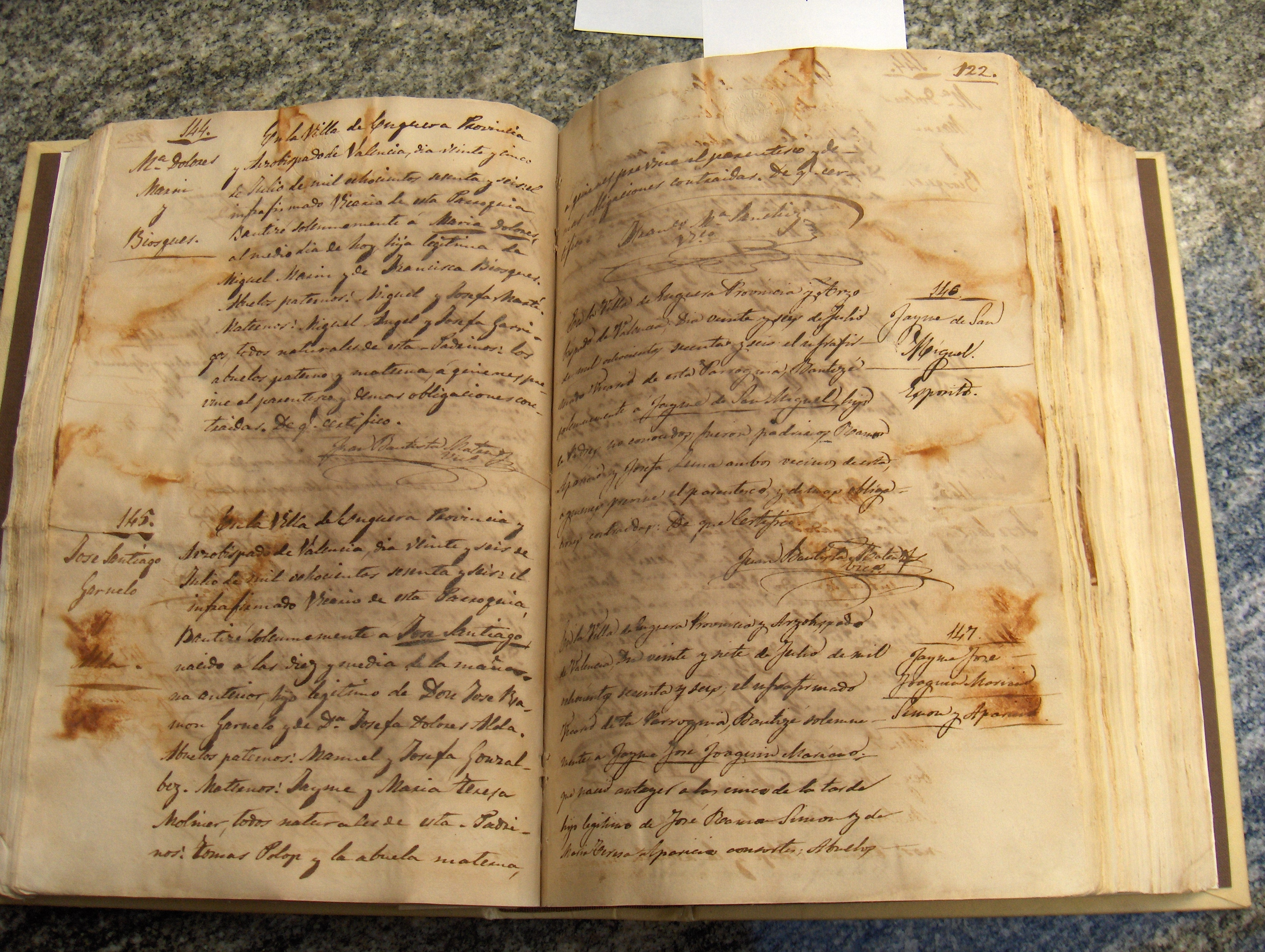
An example of Quinque Libri

Since the mid-16th century, thanks to the institution of the Quinque Libri, decided at the Council of Trent, it is possible to reconstruct the history and evolution of Sardinian surnames generation after generation. Surnames were frequently inherited from the maternal side, from the Middle Ages up to contemporary times.

== Etymology ==
Current Sardinian surnames originated in the Middle Ages. Most of the Sardinian-specific surnames derive from the Sardinian language, denoting toponyms (e.g. Bitti, from Bitti or Onnis/Onni and Fonnesu, from Fonni), in particular of ancient villages (e.g. Kerki, a village in the curatoria of Nurra, and resulting in today's Cherchi, or Sogus, in the curatoria of Gippi, from which derive today's Sogus and Desogus) now largely disappeared (it is well known, as recorded by the historian John Day, the abandonment of hundreds of Sardinian villages during the 14th century because of the Black Death and the Sardinian-Catalan war), animal names (e.g. Porcu "pig", Piga "magpie", Cadeddu "puppy dog" etc.), plant names (e.g. Meloni "melon", Floris "flower"), color names (e.g. Biancu "white", Nieddu "black"), nicknames (e.g. Pittau "Sebastian"), sometimes indicative of a personal trait (e.g. Mannu "big") or of a filial relationship (e.g. Corbeddu, "son/daughter of Mr. Corbu"), and to a lesser extent anthroponyms (e.g. Catte, Marche "Marc" etc.) or trade names (e.g. Frau "blacksmith"); some of them derive from forms related to the Paleo-Sardinian substratum and sometimes already attested as onomastic forms in Sardinian epigraphs from the Roman period.

Among the Sardinian surnames which trace their roots outside the island, sometimes sardized, the most relevant percentage (7% circa of the total) is constituted by surnames from Corsica (France), or those indicating a possible Corsican origin (e.g. Còssu, formerly written Corsu, that is "Corsican" or Còssiga, "Corsica"); these are widespread mainly, but not exclusively, in the Northern Sardinian regions of Gallura, Anglona and Sassari, where people from Corsica are recorded to have settled down and even influenced the local linguistic landscape. A considerable migratory flow coming from the other side of the Strait of Bonifacio occurred, in fact, since the Middle Ages and ended only in the first decades of the 19th century.

Relatively common are also surnames originating from the Italian Peninsula or indicating a possible Italian origin (e.g. Massa, ancient Di/De Massa e.g. Arsocco di Massa, meaning from Massa, the Sardinian-language Pisanu or the Italian equivalent Pisano, meaning from Pisa, Pirisinu from Perugia), some of which are documented starting from the Judicates' period, and especially Ligurian and Tuscan surnames due to the political relations and trade between Sardinia and the two maritime republics of Genoa and Pisa; among the most influential in Sardinian history, the Lacon-Massa (Obertenghi), the Doria, the Visconti etc.

Quite significant is also the number of Iberian surnames, or surnames originating from the Iberian Peninsula and specifically from the region of Catalonia (e.g. Aymerich, Canelles, Sanjust etc.). There are also cases of surnames that indicate an Iberian origin, even illustrious ones, already attested in records pertaining to the Judicates, such as Iohanne Cadalanu ("John the Catalan") or Gosantine de Maiorica ("Constantine from Mallorca"), or the same royal family of the Arborean Judicate, the De Serra Bas, who partly descended from the Cervera's line, Visconts of Bas; they brought a large following to Arborea, including perhaps the progenitors of the Garau families, from the Catalan Guerau "Gerard".

== Frequency ==
The following surnames are the twenty most widespread ones in Sardinia: overall, 10 of them are required to identify 10% of the Sardinian population, and less than 100 for one third of all the island's residents.

- Sanna (fang)
- Piras (toponymy)
- Pinna (feather)
- Serra (toponymy)
- Melis (honey)
- Carta (paper)
- Manca (left-handed)
- Meloni (melon)
- Mura (morus)
- Lai (toponymy)
- Murgia (brine)
- Porcu (pig)
- Cossu (Corsican)
- Usai (toponymy)
- Loi (toponymy)
- Marras (hoe)
- Floris (flower)
- Deiana (toponymy)
- Cocco
- Fadda (fairy)

=== Most widespread Sardinian surnames by Province ===
The following surnames are the most widespread ones by Province, the most common of which is Sanna ("fang").

Province	Surnames
Cagliari	Melis, Piras, Sanna, Serra, Meloni, Lai, Murgia, Pinna, Orrù, Loi.
Medio Campidano	Sanna, Piras, Melis, Murgia, Pinna, Serra, Madeddu, Atzeni, Garau, Urru.
Carbonia-Iglesias	Pinna, Melis, Piras, Sanna, Serra, Manca, Pintus, Diana, Floris, Lai.
Ogliastra	Lai, Piras, Loi, Melis, Deiana, Usai, Murru, Demurtas, Serra, Mereu.
Nuoro	Sanna, Piras, Manca, Carta, Porcu, Lai, Mura, Pinna, Floris, Serra.
Oristano	Sanna, Piras, Pinna, Manca, Mura, Carta, Serra, Meloni, Melis, Porcu.
Sassari	Sanna, Pinna, Piras, Manca, Mura, Sechi, Cossu, Solinas, Canu, Chessa.
Olbia-Tempio	Sanna, Deiana, Spano, Carta, Cossu, Addis, Pinna, Careddu, Meloni, Azara.

== See also ==
- Sardinia
- Sardinians
- Sardinian language

== Bibliography ==
- Luigi Farina (1971). Sos sambenaos sardos : i cognomi sardi. Sassari: Gallizzi.
- Robert J. Rowland, Onomastic Remarks on Roman Sardinia, Names 21:2, 1973, 82-102
- Heinz Jürgen Wolf, Sardische Herkunftsnamen, in: Beiträge zur Namensforschung, 1988, v. 23 (1-2), S. 1-67
- Maxia, Mauro (2002). Dizionario dei cognomi sardo-corsi : frequenze, fonti, etimologia. Condaghes. ISBN 88-7356-005-9.
- Maxia, Mauro (2006). I Corsi in Sardegna. Edizioni Della Torre..
- Massimo Pittau (2005–2006). Dizionario dei cognomi di Sardegna: origine e significato di 7.500 voci. Vol. 1–3. L'Unione Sarda.
- Massimo Pittau (2014). I cognomi della Sardegna: Significato e origine di 8.000 cognomi indigeni e forestieri. Ipazia Books.
- Tommaso Tuccone (2016). Buddusò. I cognomi dal Settecento ai giorni nostri. Buddusò.
