= Kadri (name) =

Unisex given name

In Albanian and Turkish, Kadri is a masculine given name. In Estonian, Kadri is a feminine given name. The name entered Latvian as the variant of Kadri, Kadrija. The name Kadri may also be used by people from Kadri, a locality in Karnataka, India, which is known for the historic Hindu Kadri Manjunath Temple.

Notable people who share the given name Kadri include:

== Male ==
- Kadrî of Pergamon, 16th century Turkish linguist
- Kadri Pasha (1832–1884), Ottoman politician
- Hoca Kadri Efendi (1855–1918), Ottoman educator and politician
- Kadri Gjata (1865–1912), Albanian patriot, writer and educator
- Kadri Prishtina (1878–1925), Albanian politician
- Kadri Breza (1880–1943), Albanian freedom fighter
- Kadri Göktulga (1904–1973), Turkish footballer
- Kadri Altay (1921–2013), Turkish general and politician
- Kadri Hazbiu (1922–1983), Albanian politician
- Kadri Roshi (1924–2007), Albanian actor
- Kadri Aytaç (1931–2003), Turkish footballer
- Kadri Gopalnath (1949–2019), Indian saxophonist
- Kadri Fellahoğlu (born 1957), Turkish Cypriot politician
- Kadri Gürsel (born 1961), Turkish journalist
- Kadri Veseli (born 1967), Kosovar politician
- Kadri Kordel, Turkish boxer

== Female ==
- Kadri Aavik (born 1980), Estonian sociologist and gender studies scholar
- Kadri Hinrikus (born 1970), Estonian children's writer and journalist
- Kadri Jäätma (born 1961), Estonian ceramicist, actress and politician
- Kadri Kimsen (born 1976), Estonian footballer
- Kadri Kõusaar (born 1980), Estonian writer, film director, translator and television presenter
- Kadri-Ann Lass (born 1996), Estonian basketball player
- Kadri Lehtla (born 1985), Estonian biathlete
- Kadri Lepp (born 1979), Estonian actress and children's writer
- Kadri Liik (born 1970), Estonian journalist and political analyst
- Kadri Mälk (1958–2023), Estonian artist and jewelry designer
- Kadri Ottis (born 1970), Estonian historian and politician
- Kadri Põldmaa (born 1970), Estonian mycologist
- Kadri Rämmeld (born 1976), Estonian actress
- Kadri Sancak (born 1966), Turkish footballer
- Kadri Simson (born 1977), Estonian politician
- Kadri Tali (born 1972), Estonian conductor
- Kadri Tali (botanist) (born 1966), Estonian botanist
- Kadri Viigipuu (born 1982), Estonian track and field athlete
- Kadri Voorand (born 1986), Estonian pop singer

== Surname ==
In Arabic, Kadri, sometimes spelt Qadri or Qaderi, and often preceded by "Al-" or "El", is a common Arabic surname.

Notable people who share the given surname Kadri include:

- Blel Kadri (born 1986), French road bicycle racer
- Ilham Kadri (born 1968), Moroccan business executive
- I. M. Kadri (born 1929), Indian architect
- Nasrin Kadri (born 1986), birth name Nasreen Qadri, Israeli singer
- Nazem Kadri (born 1990), Canadian hockey player of Lebanese descent
- Pedro Kadri (born 1995), Brazilian footballer
- Sadakat Kadri (born 1964), British lawyer and travel writer
- Sibghat Kadri (1937–2021), British lawyer
- Shimul Javeri Kadri (born 1962), Indian architect
- Feroz Kadri, Pakistani Actor

== See also ==
- Karri (name)
- Qaderi / Qadri (disambiguation), persons with the surname
