= Karra (name) =

Karra is both a given name and a surname. It is also considered to be a variant of Cara. Notable people with the name include:

== Given name ==
- Karra Elejalde (born 1960), Spanish actor

== Surname ==
- George Karra (born 1952), Israeli Arab jurist
- Irini Karra (born 1986), Greek mode
- Karra Subba Reddy (died 2004), Indian politician
- Tariq Hameed Karra (born 1955), Indian politician

== See also ==
- Kalra (surname)
- Kamra (surname)
- Kara (name)
- Kaira (disambiguation)
- Karla (name)
- Karma (disambiguation)
- Karna (disambiguation)
- Karpa (surname)
- Karr (surname)
- Karra (disambiguation)
- Karrar (name)
- Karre
- Karri (name)
- Karta (disambiguation)
- Kasra (disambiguation)
- Korra (disambiguation)
