= Kalra (surname) =

Kalra is an Arora Khatri Hindu and Sikh surname originating in the Punjab region.

== Notable people ==
Notable people with this name include:

- Ash Kalra (born 1972), American politician
- Deep Kalra, Indian businessman
- Dipak Kalra (born 1959), British health scientist, doctor and innovator
- Jai Kalra, Indian film and television actor
- Jaspal Inder Singh Kalra, Indian restaurateur, food columnist, television host, and author
- Jawahar Kalra (born 1949), Indian-Canadian pathologist and physician
- Jiggs Kalra (1947–2019), Indian chef, food critic, TV presenter and writer
- Manjot Kalra (born 1999), Indian cricketer
- Monika Kalra Varma, American lawyer
- Pawan Kalra (born 1972), Indian voice artist
- Sampooran Singh Kalra (born 1934), Indian lyricist
- Sanjay Kalra (born 1970), Indian Endocrinologist
- Sonal Kalra, Indian journalist and author
- Smriti Kalra (born 1987), Indian television actress
- VD Kalra (1936–1996), Indian producer and actor
- Virinder Kalra (born 1967), British sociologist and professor
- Viveik Kalra, English actor
- Zorawar Kalra (born 1977), Indian restaurateur

== See also ==
- Karra (name)
