= Karri (name) =

Karri is a given name and surname.

== Given name ==
- Karri Hietamäki (born 1969), Finnish cross-country skier
- Karri Käyhkö (1937–2020), Finnish swimmer
- Karri Kivi (born 1970), Finnish ice hockey player and coach
- Karri Koira, Finnish rapper, R&B artist and producer
- Karri McMahon (born 1992), Australian field hockey player
- Karri Padma Sree (born 1976), Indian politician and humanitarian
- Karri Rämö (born 1986), Finnish professional ice hockey player
- Karri Somerville (born 1999), Australian field hockey player
- Karri Turner (born 1966), American television actress
- Karri Willms (born 1969), Canadian curler and curling coach

== Surname ==
- Karri Narayana Rao, Indian politician
- Nagendra Karri (born 1982), American film director, producer and screenwriter
- Ramesh Karri, American computer scientist
- Sriram Karri (born 1973), Indian English-language novelist

== See also ==
- Karri (disambiguation)
- Karra (name)
- Karre
- Karrie
- Kari (name)
- Karli (name)
- Kadri (name)
- Karki (surname)
