= Kardar =

Kardar may refer to:

== Persons ==
- Kardar (surname)

== Places ==
- Kardar, Byaban, Iran
- Kardar, Minab, Iran

== See also ==
- Karrar (name)
