= Karta =

Karta may refer to:

== Places ==
- Karta, Iran, a village in Izeh County, Khuzestan Province, Iran
- Karta, Andika, a village in Andika County, Khuzestan Province, Iran
- Kharta or Karta, a Himalayan region in Tibet
- Kangaroo Island or Karta, an island in South Australia

== Other uses ==
- Karta (orangutan) (1982–2017), a Sumatran orangutan
- KARTA Center, a Polish NGO
- Karta Palace, a 17th-century palace in Central Java
- Melakarta or karta, a parent raga of South Indian classical music
- Kārta, a goddess in Latvian mythology
- Karta, a senior person in a Hindu joint family
- Karta, ruler of the fictional city of Khansar in the 2023 Indian film Salaar

== See also ==
- Carta (disambiguation)
- Karra (disambiguation)
