= Karen (orangutan) =

First orangutan to have open heart surgery (born 1992)

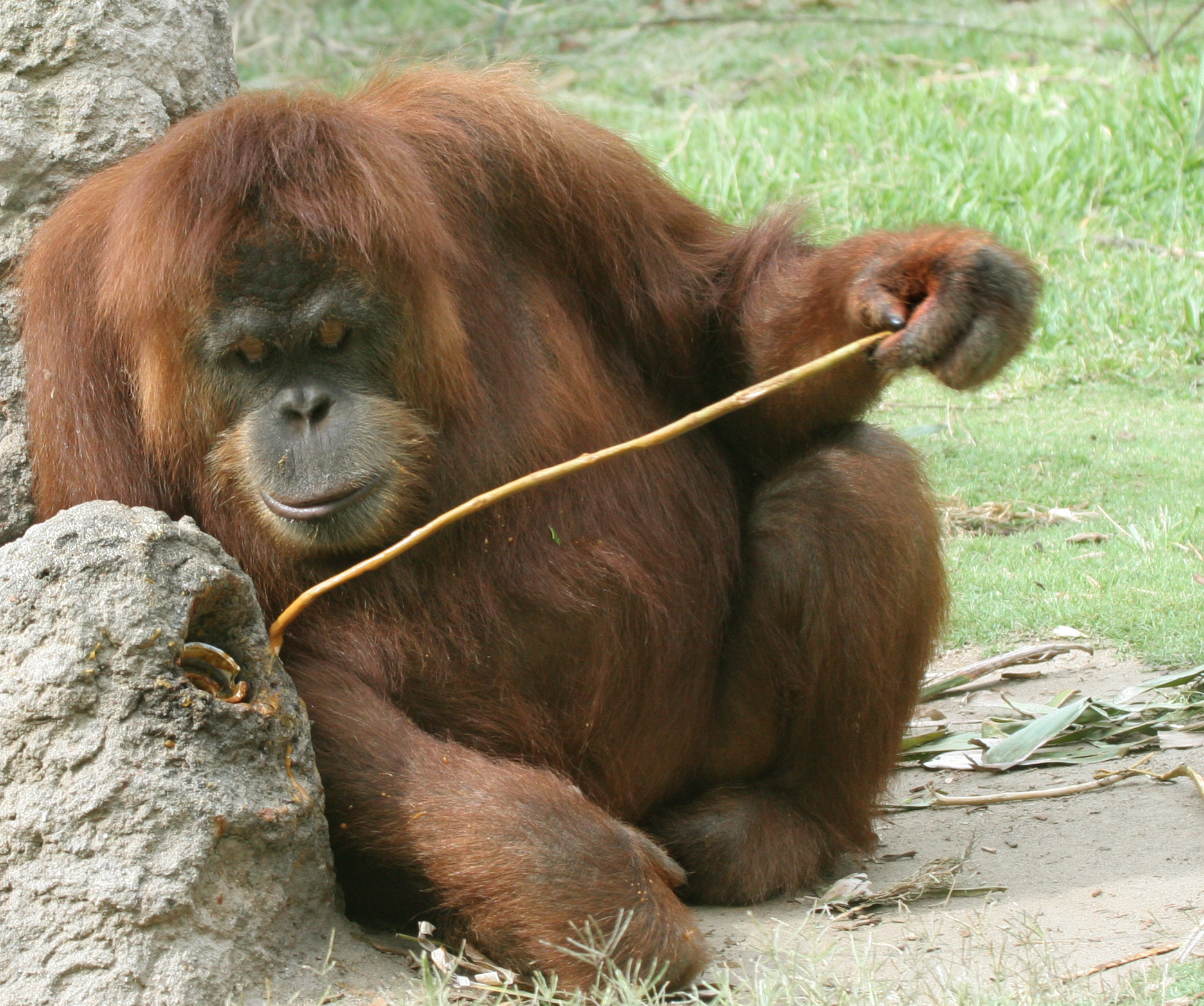
- Other name: Kare-Bear
- Species: Sumatran orangutan
- Sex: Female
- Born: June 11, 1992 (age 34); San Diego Zoo
- Known for: First orangutan to have open heart surgery (1994); Among first non-humans to receive a vaccine for COVID-19 (2021)
- Residence: San Diego Zoo
- Parents: Karta (mother); Otis (father)
- Karen

Karen (born June 11, 1992) is a Sumatran orangutan (Pongo abelii), who, on August 27, 1994 at the San Diego Zoo, was the first orangutan to have open heart surgery and in 2021 was among the first non-humans to receive a vaccine for COVID-19.

Concerns for the endangered species of Sumatran orangutan at a time when routine open heart surgery was being performed in human babies, combined with a collaboration between the San Diego Zoo and UC San Diego Health, led to the planning of repairing the large hole in the heart in two-year-old Karen. The operation and after-care required the co-operation of more than 100 volunteers and the resulting procedure was successful and widely publicised. Karen became a favorite with zoo visitors, surviving more than 25 years.

Karen is the subject of a book by Georgeanne Irvine titled Karen’s Heart: The True Story of a Brave Baby Orangutan, published by Blue Sneaker Press in 2018.

== Background ==
Wild Sumatran orangutans are critically endangered. In the 1970s, UC San Diego Health (UCSD) pathologist Kurt Benirschke, persuaded zoo trustees to establish a research department, at the zoo's Center for the Reproduction of Endangered Species, which he subsequently led, providing the collaboration between the University and the zoo.

Orangutan and human hearts have much similarity, and open heart surgery had become routine in human babies.

== Early life and family ==
Karen, also known as "Kare-Bear", a Sumatran orangutan, was born at the San Diego Zoo on 11 June 1992 to nine-year-old mother Karta and father Otis.

After 1995, Karta lost six infants over the course of 15 years. Observations eventually led to the discovery of Karta's difficulties in breastfeeding due to her small nipples. Her babies were either stillborn or could not latch on and therefore failed to thrive.

The zookeepers observed that Karen was not being nursed in the first few days of life and she was therefore removed from Karta. On reintroducing her back to Karta, no change was seen and Karen was removed again to be handraised. Karta was subsequently sent to Adelaide Zoo in November 1992 and Karen was adopted by orangutan Josephine.

Karen was found to have a heart murmur at a health check-up at the age of two, after it was noted that she was not growing at the appropriate speed. Tests then confirmed a penny-size hole in the heart. At the time, Karen weighed 22 pounds (10.0 kg) and her condition was considered fatal without surgical correction.

== Heart surgery ==
A surgical team led by cardiothoracic surgeon Stuart W. Jamieson from UCSD repaired the defect by opening Karen's chest and heart and stitching the hole to close it. Despite some structural variation between Karen's chest wall and that of a human, once inside the chest cavity, the surgeons felt familiar with the heart surgery. The whole procedure required the co-operation of a number of surgeons, nurses, anaesthetists, medical technicians, veterinarians and animal keepers and lasted seven hours. Jamieson reported that "If Karen were human, I'd tell her parents that everything went fine, and her prognosis is excellent". She became the first orangutan to have open heart surgery.

Following the operation, Karen required carefully co-ordinated care, which involved more than 100 volunteers. Although she suffered a lung complication, it was managed successfully and she survived to make headlines, receiving get-well cards from all over the world.

== Life after surgery ==
Karen subsequently became a favorite with zoo visitors. She has been described as "stubborn and willful, just like her mum", and is said to have a signature move, where she rolls rather than walks.

Although not usually housed together, Karen, like some other orangutans is found to get along well with siamang gibbons.

A book about Karen was published in 2018, titled Karen’s Heart: The True Story of a Brave Baby Orangutan.

== COVID-19 vaccination ==
Karen was one of the first non-humans to receive a COVID-19 vaccine.

== See also ==
- List of individual apes
