= Kamra =

Kamra may refer to:

- Kamra (surname)
- Kamra, Pakistan, a town in Attock District, Punjab
  - PAC Kamra (Pakistan Aeronautical Complex), in the town
  - Kamra Air Base (PAF Base Minhas), in the town
  - Kamra Cantonment, adjacent to the airbase
