= Karrar =

Karrar may refer to:

- Karrar (name), a list of people with the given name
- Karrar (tank), an Iranian main battle tank
- HESA Karrar, an Iranian jet-powered target drone
- Karrar, Kurdamir, a village in Azerbaijan
- Karrer (crater), a lunar crater

== See also ==
- Karra (disambiguation)
