= Karpa (surname) =

Karpa is a surname. Notable people with this surname include:

- Dave Karpa (born 1971), Canadian ice hockey player
- Irena Karpa (born 1980), Ukrainian writer and singer
- Natalka Karpa (born 1981), Ukrainian singer
- Uwe Karpa (born 1945), German actor

== See also ==
- Karra (name)
