= Cossiga =

Cossiga (pronounced [ˈkosiɣa]) is a Sardinian surname, originally indicating a person from Corsica. Notable people with the surname include:

- Francesco Cossiga (1928–2010), Italian politician, President of the Republic and Prime Minister
- Giuseppe Cossiga (born 1963), Italian politician

== See also ==
- Cossu
