= Karan =

Karan may refer to:

== People ==
- Karan (given name), an Indian given name
  - Karan (actor), Indian actor
- Karan (surname), a surname
- Karan (caste), an Indian caste
- Karan Kayastha, a community of Kayastha in Bihar, India

== Places ==
- Karan, Iran (disambiguation), a name for various villages in Iran
- Karan, Mali, a town in Mali
- Karan (Užice), a village in Serbia
- Karan District, a district in the Northeastern Banaadir region of Somalia
- Karan, Alsheyevsky District, Republic of Bashkortostan, a village in Russia

== See also ==
- Karen (disambiguation)
- Karna (disambiguation)
  - Karna, a character in the ancient Indian epic Mahābhārata
- Karn (disambiguation)
- Karana (disambiguation)
- Karnan (disambiguation)
