= Kerar =

Kerar may refer to:

- Karrar, Kurdamir, Azerbaijan
- Krar, a musical instrument

== See also ==
- Quérard (disambiguation)
