= Karno =

Karno may refer to:

== Plants ==
- Platysace maxwellii

== People ==
=== Surname ===
- Fred Karno (1866–1941), British theatre impresario
- Norton S. Karno (born 1936), American attorney
- Rano Karno (born 1960), Indonesian actor and politician
- Rendra Karno (1920–1985), Indonesian actor
- Bung Karno, nickname of Sukarno (1901–1970), first President of Indonesia

=== Given name ===
- Karno Barkah (1922–2009), Indonesian aviation pioneer

=== Fictional characters ===
- Madelein Karno, a character from books written by Lene Kaaberbøl

== See also ==
- Karna (disambiguation)
