= Florissant =

Florissant may refer to:

- Florissant, Colorado, a census-designated place
- Florissant Fossil Beds National Monument, a United States National Monument, Colorado
- Florissant, Missouri, a city
- Florissant Township, St. Louis County, Missouri

== See also ==
- Florissantia (plant), an extinct species of flowering plants
- Florissantia (planthopper), an extinct plant hopper genus
- Floris (disambiguation)
