= Karta (orangutan) =

Sumatran orangutan (1982–2017)

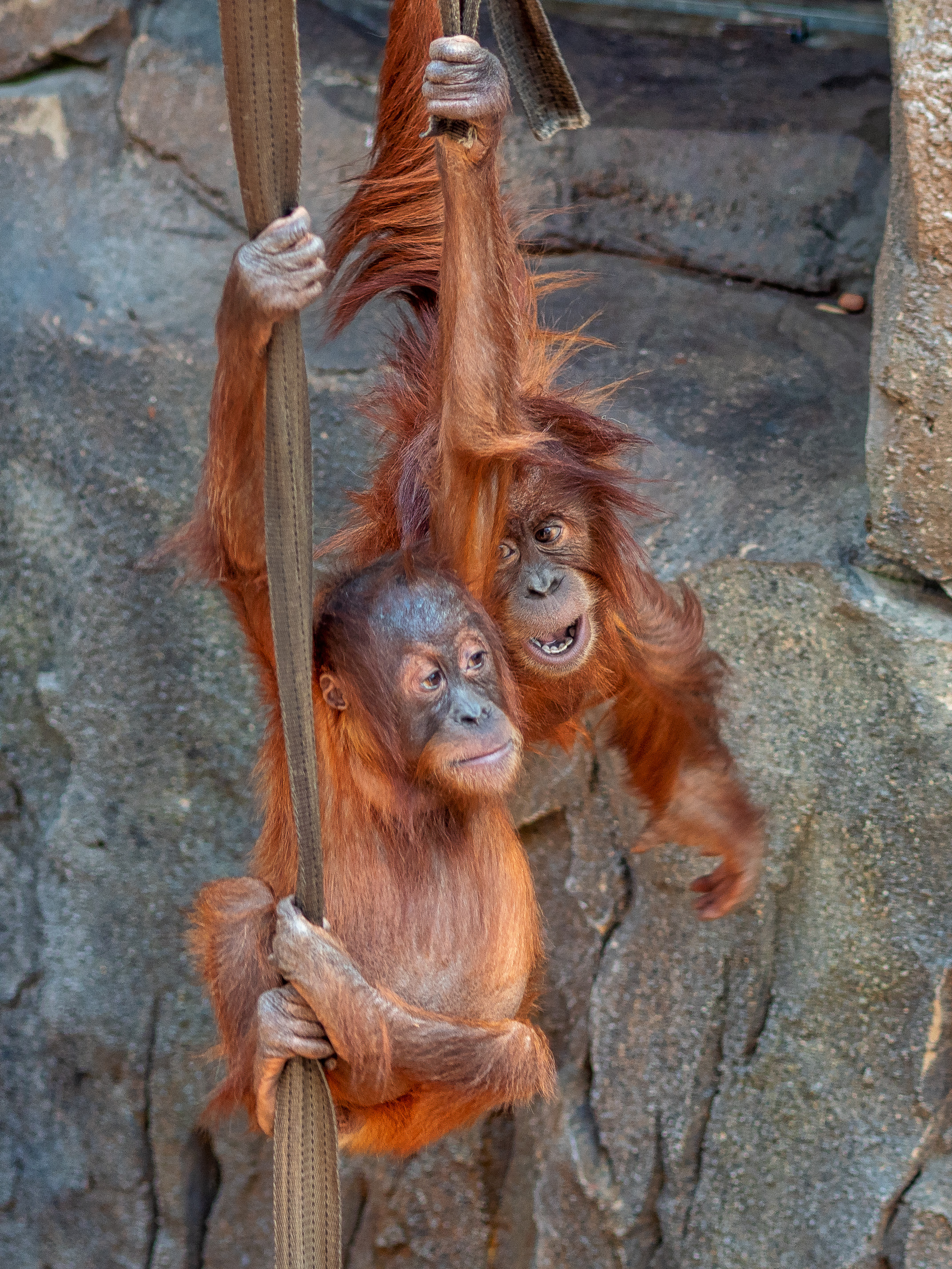
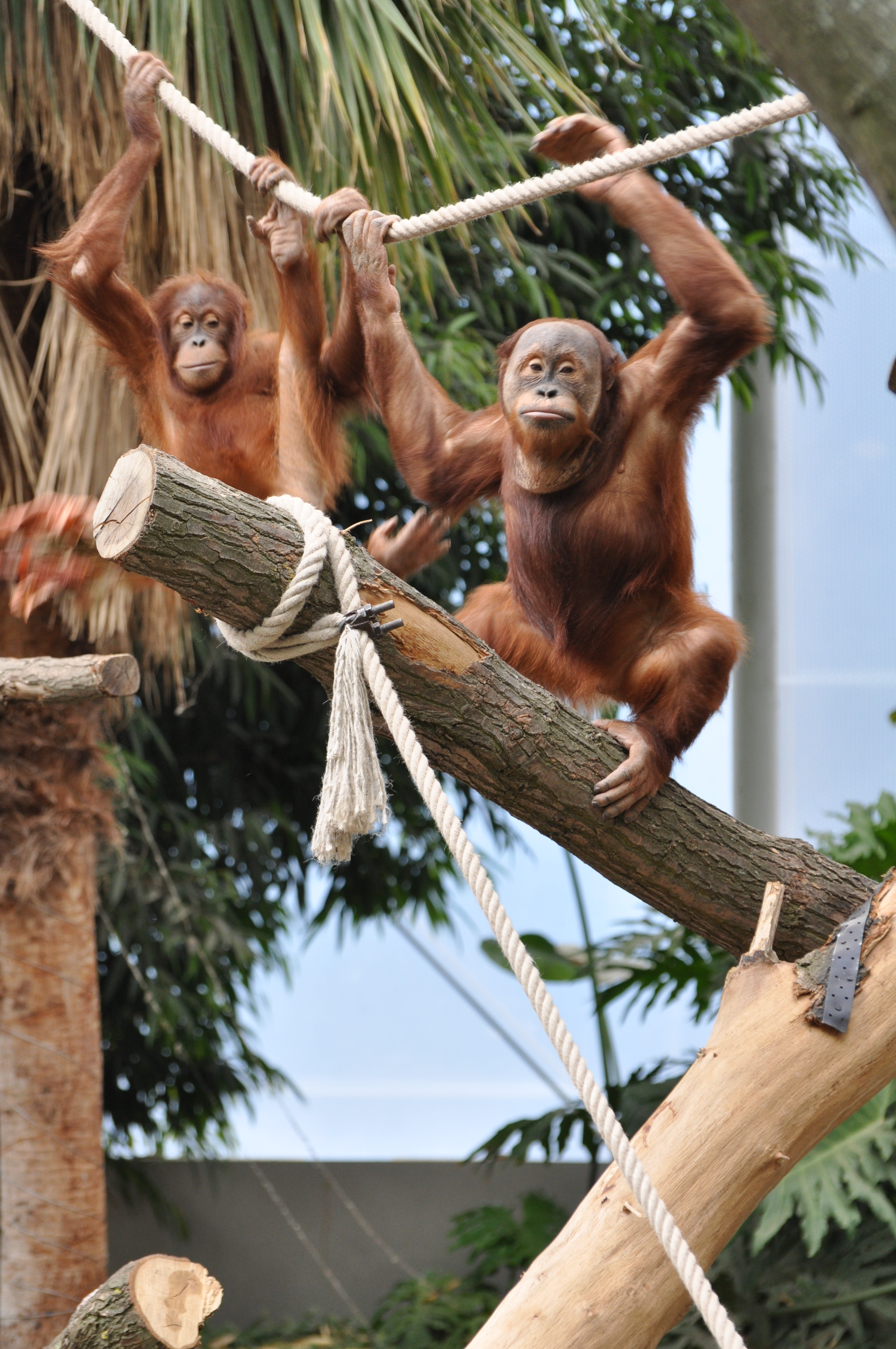
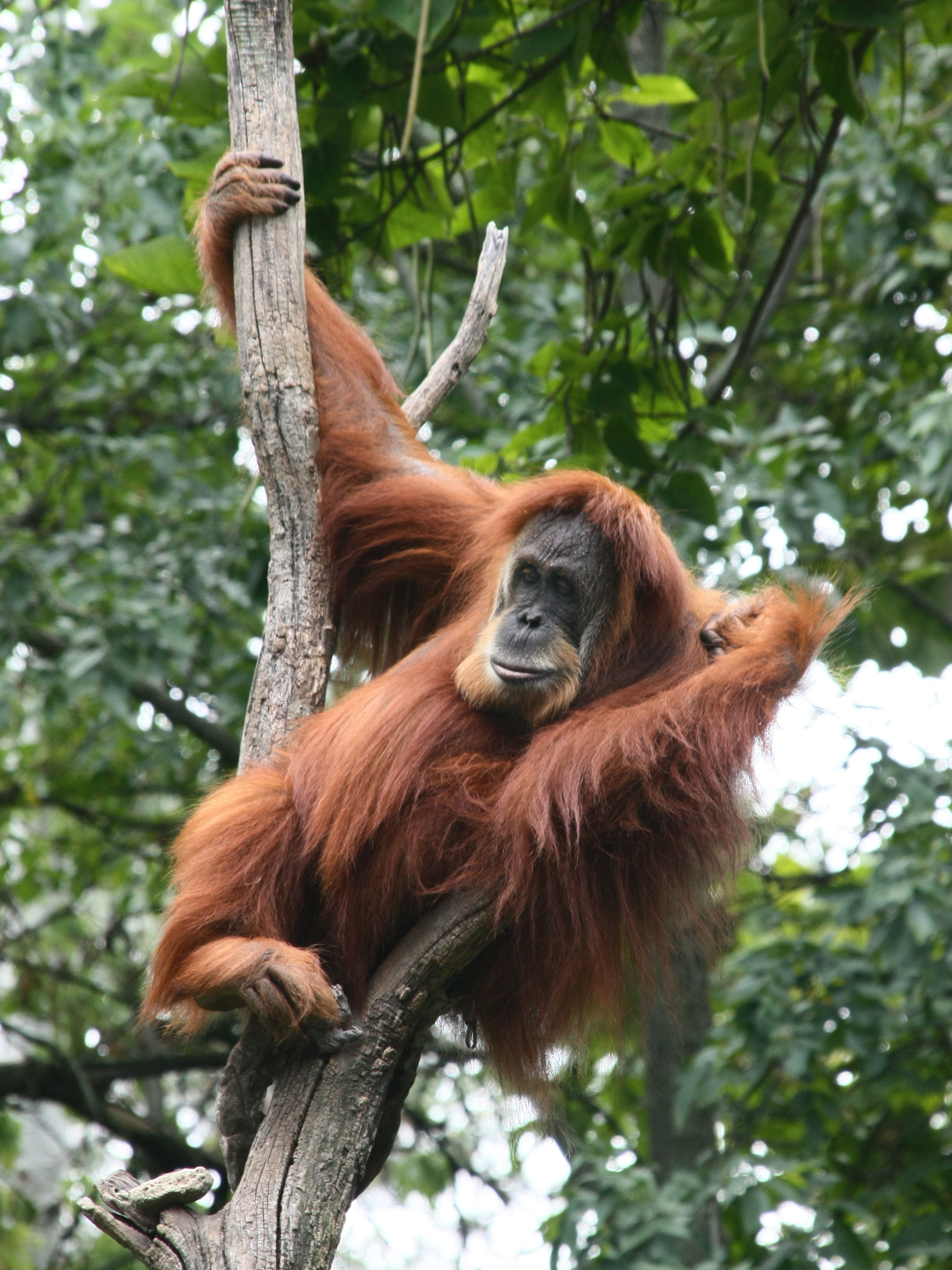
- Above: Sumatran orangutans
- Species: Sumatran orangutan
- Sex: Female
- Born: 22 July 1982; San Diego Zoo
- Died: January 2017 (aged 34); Adelaide Zoo
- Parents: Helen (mother); Otis (father)
- Offspring: Karen

Karta (22 July 1982 – January 2017) was a Sumatran orangutan (Pongo abelii), who is best remembered for her attempts to have a living baby and care for it herself, first at the San Diego Zoo in the United States, and later at Adelaide Zoo in Australia.

Karta was the mother of celebrity orangutan Karen, her one surviving offspring who was handraised by zookeepers and who in 1994 became the first orangutan to undergo open heart surgery. Unable to thrive under Karta's care, Karen was removed and Karta was transferred to Adelaide Zoo, where after a number of baby losses, she was taught baby care and trained to nurse.

Karta made headlines in 2009 when she short circuited the electric fence around her enclosure and made a brief escape. In the same year, she was the face of a national campaign for the conservation of orangutan habitats.

She died during the birth of her stillborn baby in January 2017, following which funds were raised to erect Camp Karta in her name at Bukit Tigapuluh National Park in central Sumatra.

== Early life ==
Karta was born on 22 July 1982 to Jane and Otis at the San Diego Zoo, where she spent her first 10 years. Her mother raised her and her younger sister Nias (born 1988), until they were both transferred to another zoo, leaving Karta at San Diego.

== Karen ==
In 1992, following failed contraception, Karta had an unplanned pregnancy with Otis and on 11 June 1992, she gave birth to Karen.

The zookeepers observed that Karen was not being nursed in the first few days of life and she was therefore removed from Karta. On reintroducing her back to Karta, feeding did not recommence and Karen was removed again to be handraised.

Following the discovery of a large hole in the heart, Karen became the first orangutan to have open heart surgery, becoming a celebrity overnight.

== Infant losses ==
Over the course of the next 15 years, Karta experienced a number of infant losses.

- August 1995; Karta gave birth to a healthy baby but the baby died at four days old. It took two days for the zookeepers to separate her from the baby. Although a head injury was found, it was not the cause of death.
- April 1997; Karta delivered a baby at night but it was found dead in the morning.
- May 2003; Karta gave birth to a live baby who died the next day. It took three days to remove the baby from Karta, following which a postmortem was inconclusive.
- May 2011; Karta gave birth to a live baby who was found dead at day four. The postmortem revealed an empty stomach.
- 2014; Another stillbirth.

Karta's caring skills as a mother were adequate. She had already been trained in mothering skills using a toy orangutan. It took a number of years and four infant losses to realise that it was breastfeeding that was the problem. Her small nipples caused an inability to nurse the infant and the infant failed to thrive. Extra monitoring and teaching of infant care were put into place on the discovery of an unplanned pregnancy in 2016.

In 1997, Karta was sent to Perth to learn mothering skills. Her bad behaviour however, resulted in her being returned to Adelaide. In 2003, she was noted to have a good interaction with a pair of siamangs.

== Mates ==
In February 2006 Karta and her mate Pusung were transferred to the new orangutan facility at Adelaide Zoo. In 2009, Pusung died at the age of 31 from a chest infection.

In June 2007, Karta was introduced to 12 year old Kluet and within six months they had formed a strong bond.

== National campaign ==
In May 2009, efforts to discourage people from buying palm oil products because its production involved destroying orangutan habitats were revealed in an advertisement in New Scientist. At the same time, Karta's image was used in the national campaign which encouraged the Australian government to introduce strict food labelling of products containing palm oil.

== Escape attempts ==
Also in May 2009, Karta made a brief escape from her enclosure at the Zoo by twisting a stick around the electrified wires and short-circuiting the fence around her. A Zoo spokesman said: "She climbed over those disabled hot wires, built up a mound of leaf litter and then used a branch to climb out of the exhibit and on to the surrounding wall of the exhibit." She had tried the same thing before but only to get food. She was outside her enclosure for about 30 minutes before returning peacefully. Zoo officials speculated that she may have been looking for her recently deceased mate, Pusung.

== Death and legacy ==
Karta died from heavy blood loss after giving birth to a still born baby in January 2017. The unborn baby had aspirated meconium. Subsequently the zoo received more than 2,500 expressions of condolence.

Funds were raised by the Zoo to build a guard post to defend wild orangutans, Camp Karta in Bukit Tigapuluh National Park, in central Sumatra.

== See also ==
- List of individual apes
