= Fadda =

Fadda is a surname. Notable people with the surname include:

- Carlo Fadda (1853–1931), Italian jurist and politician
- Oswaldo Fadda (1921–2005), Brazilian jiu-jitsu practitioner
