= Karana =

Karana may refer to:

- Karana, ancient Mesopotamian city state, possibly modern day Tell al-Rimah
- Karrana, a village in Bahrain
- Karana (dance) are the 108 key transitions in classical Indian dance described in Natya Shastra
- Karan (caste) or Karana, a caste of Odisha state in India
- Karana (astronomy), a historical genre of Indian texts on astronomy
- Karana (pancanga), one among the five co-ordinate members (pancanga) in the Indian system of astronomical calculations
- Karana (moth), a genus of moths of the family Noctuidae
- Kāraṇa, cause and effect in Advaita Vedanta
- Karana, colloquial term for Indians in Madagascar
- Karana, the main character in Scott O'Dell's novel Island of the Blue Dolphins, who is based on the historical Juana Maria
- Karana the Rainkeeper, the god of rain and storms in the EverQuest MMORPG

== See also ==
- Karan (disambiguation)
- Karna (disambiguation)
- Karn (disambiguation)
- Karnan (disambiguation)
- Karna, a character in the ancient Indian epic Mahābhārata
