= Karnana =

Karnana may refer to:

- Karnana, Gujrat, village in Pakistani Punjab
- Karnana, India, village in Indian Punjab

== See also ==
- Karnan (disambiguation)
