= Melloni =

Melloni is an Italian surname. Notable people with the name include:

- Alberto Melloni (born 1959), Italian church historian and UNESCO member
- Javier Melloni (born 1962), Italian-Spanish Jesuit anthropologist and theologian
- Macedonio Melloni (1798–1854), Italian physicist

== See also ==
- Meloni
