= Kadrî of Pergamon =

Ottoman linguist and author

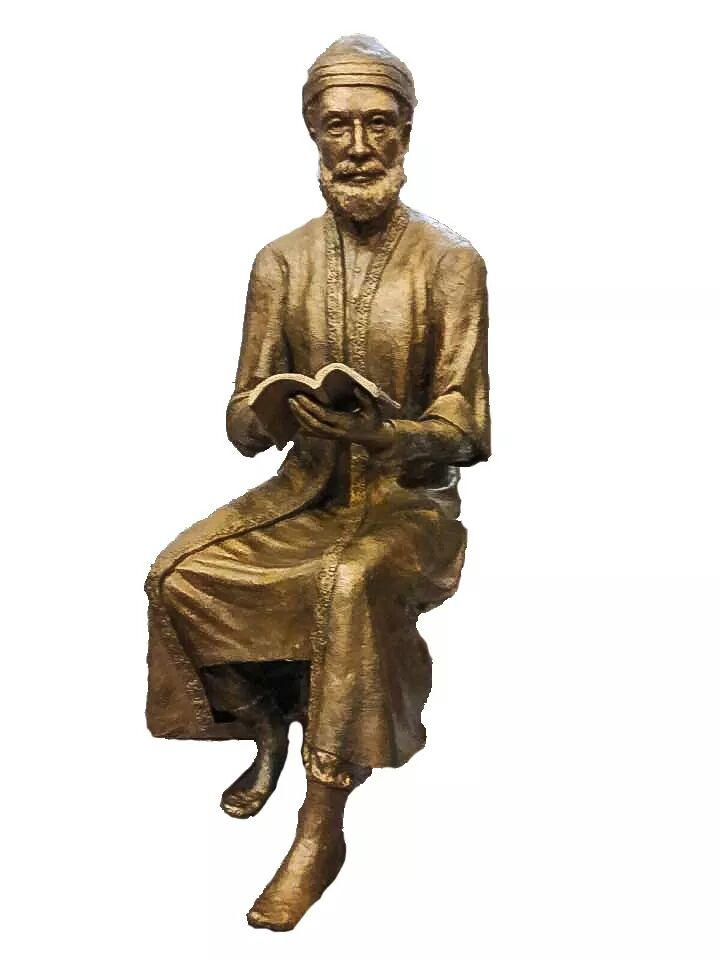
statue of Kadri by Ekin Erman

Kadrî of Pergamon (Turkish: Bergamalı Kadrî) was a 16th-century Ottoman linguist, author of an early grammar book on the Ottoman language.

Little is known about the life of Kadrî other than what he mentions in his own writing: He calls himself Bergamalı, so he was probably born and raised in Bergama (ancient Pergamon), and at some point he went to Istanbul, wrote his book in 1530, and presented it to Ibrahim Pasha, the grand vizier of Sultan Suleiman.

His book, titled Müyessiretü’l-ulûm ("Facilitator of Knowledge"), was the first book of grammar written in a Western Oghuz Turkish language. The first part of the book includes a poem in praise of Ibrahim Pasha, the date of writing, the reasons for writing, and a discussion of the main topics. A definition of kelime ("word") is given and then is divided into three types, isim ("noun"), fiil ("verb"), and harf (edat; "particle" or "postposition"). Examples are given using Arabic grammar as a model. The second part of the book focuses on nouns. After the explanations, a poem by the poet Hayâlî is analyzed according to grammar rules and as literature.

A manuscript of the book was brought to light by Mehmet Tahir of Bursa in 1911 and was published in facsimile by Besim Atalay in 1946. At some point the manuscript was lost. However, the lost manuscript may be the same as Ms. or.oc.2056 in a library in Frankfurt. The book was edited by Esra Karabacak and published by the Turkish Language Association in 2002.

A statue of Kadrî by Ekin Erman was erected by the Bergama Municipality in the city center in 2016.
