= Kardar (surname) =

Surname in Pakistan, Iran and Afghanistan

- Jāti: Arain
- Religions: Islam
- Languages: Punjabi
- Country: Iran, Pakistan, Afghanistan
- Region: Punjab
- Ethnicity: Punjabi
- Family names: yes

Kardar is a surname and a Punjabi Arain clan of mainly Pakistan, Iran and Afghanistan.

== People ==
People with the surname Kardar:

- A. J. Kardar (1926–2002), Pakistani film director, producer and screenwriter
- Abdul Hafeez Kardar (1925–1996), Pakistani international cricketer
- Abdur Rashid Kardar (also known as A. R. Kardar) (1904–1989), Pakistani and Indian film director
- Mehran Kardar, Iranian-American physicist
- Shahid Hafeez Kardar, former Governor, State Bank of Pakistan, later vice-chancellor of Beaconhouse National University, Lahore, Pakistan

== See also ==
- Kardar (disambiguation)
