= Karrar (name) =

Karrar is a given name. Notable people with this name include the following:

- Karrar Hussain (1911–1999), Pakistani educationist, writer and literary critic
- Karrar Jassim (born 1987), Iraqi footballer
- Karrar Mohammed (born 1989), Iraqi footballer
- Karrar Nabeel (born 1998), Iraqi footballer

== See also ==
- Karra
- Kardar (disambiguation)
- Karrar (disambiguation)
