= Karn =

Karn or KARN may refer to:

== People ==
- Avinash Karn (born 1995), Nepalese cricketer
- Esther Nelson Karn (1860–1936), American poet
- Mick Karn (1958–2011), Cypriot-British musician
- Phil Karn (born 1956), American engineer
- Phil Karn (soccer) (born 1975), American soccer player
- Richard Karn (born 1956), American actor, author and game show host

== Radio stations ==
- KARN (AM), a radio station in Little Rock, Arkansas, U.S.
- KARN-FM, a radio station in Little Rock, Arkansas, U.S.

== Other uses ==
- Karn (comics), a Marvel Comics character
- Sisterhood of Karn, fictional religious cult in Doctor Who
- Syril Karn, a Star Wars character

== See also ==
- Karna (disambiguation)
  - Karna, a character in the Hindu epic Mahābhārata
- Karnan (disambiguation)
- Karan (disambiguation)
- Karana (disambiguation)
- Karn's algorithm, for estimating round-trip times for TCP messages in computer networking
