= Atzeni =

Atzeni (Italian: [atˈtsɛːni], Sardinian: [aˈtseni]) is a Sardinian surname, probably derived from an old place name Atzena near Oristano. Notable people with the surname include:

- Alessandro Atzeni (born 1980), Italian footballer
- Andrea Atzeni (born 1991), Italian jockey
- Giovanni "Tittia" Atzeni (born 1985), Italian palio jockey
- Sergio Atzeni (1952–1995), Italian writer

== See also ==
- Atzei
