= Porcus =

Porcus may refer to:

- Porcus, a cognomen in Ancient Rome; see List of Roman cognomina
- Porcus, a genus of fish now known as Bagrus
- porcus, a specific name often used in the family Suidae

== See also ==
- Porcu (disambiguation)
