= Maharathi Karna =

Maharathi Karna may refer to:

- Maharathi Karna (film), a 1944 Bollywood film
- Maharathi Karna, a 2003 TV series broadcast by DD National
- Karna The True Battler, also known as Maharathi Karna, a Hindi film of 1928

== See also ==
- Maharathi (disambiguation)
- Karna (disambiguation)
