= Dettori =

Dettori is an Italian surname. Notable people with the surname include:

- Alessandro Dettori (born 1989), Italian footballer
- Bruno Dettori (1941–2020), Italian politician
- Francesco Dettori (born 1983), Italian footballer
- Frankie Dettori (born 1970), Italian horse racing jockey
- Giancarlo Dettori (1932–2026), Italian actor
- Gianfranco Dettori (born 1941), Italian horse racing jockey, father of Frankie (Lanfranco) above
