= Floris =

Floris may refer to:

== People ==
=== Given name ===
- Five counts of Holland:
  - Floris I, Count of Holland (c.1017–1061)
  - Floris II, Count of Holland (c.1085–1121)
  - Floris III, Count of Holland (1141–1190)
  - Floris IV, Count of Holland (1210–1234)
  - Floris de Voogd (c.1228–1258), interim count of Holland, and guardian of Floris V
  - Floris V, Count of Holland (1254–1296)
- Floris of Zeeland (c.1255–1297), stadholder of Zeeland
- Floris Arntzenius (1864–1925), Dutch painter, water-colourist, illustrator and printmaker
- Floris van den Berg (born 1973), Dutch philosopher and skeptic
- Floris Jan Bovelander (born 1966), Dutch field hockey player
- Floris Braat (born 1979), Dutch slalom canoeist
- Floris Cohen (born 1946), Dutch historian of science
- Floris De Tier (born 1992), Belgian racing cyclist
- Floris Diergaardt (born 1980), Namibian football striker
- Floris van Dijck (c.1575–1651), Dutch still life painter
- Floris van Egmont (c.1470–1539), Dutch nobleman, stadtholder of Guelders and Friesland
- Floris Evers (born 1983), Dutch field hockey player
- Floris Gerts (born 1992), Dutch racing cyclist
- Floris Goesinnen (born 1983), Dutch racing cyclist
- Floris van der Haer (1547–1634), Flemish clergyman and history writer
- Floris Adriaan van Hall (1791–1866), Dutch nobleman and statesman, Prime Minister of the Netherlands 1853 / 1861
- Floris van Imhoff (born 1964), Dutch curler
- Floris Isola (born 1991), French football midfielder
- Floris Jansen (born 1962), Dutch cricketer
- Floris Jespers (1889–1965), Belgian Avant-garde painter
- Floris Kaayk (born 1982), Dutch digital artist
- Flóris Korb (1860–1930), Hungarian architect
- Floris van der Linden (born 1996), Dutch football forward
- Floris of Montmorency (1528–1570), Flemish noble and diplomat
- Floris Nollet (1794–1853), Belgian physicist, engineer and inventor
- Prince Floris of Orange-Nassau, van Vollenhoven (born 1975), nephew of Queen Beatrix
- Floris Osmond (1849–1912), French engineer and metallographer
- Floris van Schooten (c.1586–1656), Dutch still life painter
- Floris Stempel (1877–1910), Dutch founder and chairman of football club Ajax
- Floris Takens (1940–2010), Dutch mathematician
- Floris Verster (1861–1927), Dutch painter
- Floris de Vries (born 1989), Dutch golfer
- Floris van Wevelinkhoven (c.1315–1393), Bishop of Münster and Bishop of Utrecht

=== Surname ===
- Anna Floris (born 1982), Italian tennis player
- Emilio Floris (born 1944), Italian politician
- Frans Floris (1517–1570), Flemish historical and portrait painter
- Gianluca Floris (born 1964), Italian writer and belcanto singer
- Maria Eizaguerri Floris (born 2004), Spanish chess master
- Roberta Floris (born 1979), Italian journalist, television presenter and former model
- Roberto Floris (born 1986), Argentine football defender
- Sandro Floris (born 1965), Italian sprinter

== Fiction ==
- Floris and Blancheflour, a medieval literary story that was common in many languages in the Middle Ages
- Floris (TV series), a 1969 Dutch TV series and the title character
  - Floris (film), a 2004 film based on the TV series

== Other ==
- Floris, Iowa, United States
- Floris, Virginia, United States
- Floris of London, a London-based perfumer
- Storm Floris, a 2025 windstorm

== See also ==
- Florissant (disambiguation), United States
- Florist
- Fiore (disambiguation)
