= Carta =

Carta may refer to:

== People with the surname ==
- Angelico Carta (1886–?), Italian military officer
- Antonella Carta (born 1967), Italian footballer
- Fabio Carta (born 1977), Italian short track speed skater
- Federica Carta (field hockey) (born 2000), Italian field hockey player
- Federica Carta (singer) (born 1999), Italian singer-songwriter
- Gianuario Carta (1931–2017), Italian politician
- John Carta (1946–1990), American parachutist
- Joseph Carta (born 2000), known professionally as Holden, Italian singer-songwriter and record producer
- Marco Carta (born 1985), Italian singer
- Maria Carta (1934–1994), Italian singer-songwriter
- Mino Carta (1933–2025), Italian-born Brazilian journalist
- Paolo Carta (born 1964), Italian musician
- Virginia Elena Carta (born 1996), Italian professional golfer

== Other uses ==
- Carta (publisher), an Israeli publishing and mapping company
- Carta (software company), an American capitalization services company
- Carta Worldwide, a Canadian financial company
- Center for Academic Research and Training in Anthropogeny, University of California, San Diego
- Charleston Area Regional Transportation Authority
- Chattanooga Area Regional Transportation Authority
- FR-2, a synthetic resin bonded paper commercialized as Carta

== See also ==
- Cârța (disambiguation)
- Karta (disambiguation)
- Magna Carta (disambiguation)
