= Quérard =

Quérard may refer to:

- Estelle Quérard
- Joseph-Marie Quérard

== See also ==
- Kerar (disambiguation)
