= Murgia =

Murgia may refer to:

== Geography ==
- Altopiano delle Murge, a plateau in Apulia, Italy
- Alta Murgia National Park, Italy
- Murgia, Álava, a village in Basque Country, Spain

== People ==
- Alessandro Murgia, Italian footballer
- Alessio Murgia, Italian footballer
- David Murgia, Belgian actor
- Madhumita Murgia, writer and journalist
- Michela Murgia, Italian novelist
- Nicole Murgia, Italian actress
- Tiberio Murgia, Italian actor

== Other ==
- Murgia motion
