= Karra =

Karra may refer to:

- Karra River, a river in Makawanpur district of Bagmati Province, Nepal
- Karra block, a community development block in Khunti district, Jharkhand, India
  - Karra, Khunti, a village in Jharkhand, India
- Karra (name)

== See also ==
- Kaira (disambiguation)
- Karma (disambiguation)
- Karna (disambiguation)
- Karrar (disambiguation)
- Karta (disambiguation)
- Kasra (disambiguation)
- Korra (disambiguation)
