= Karnan =

Karnan may refer to:

- Karna, a character from the Mahabharata also known as Karnan
- The Oath of Kärnan, a steel roller coaster in Germany
- M. Karnan, an Indian cinematographer and director
- Karnan (1964 film), 1964 Indian film by B. R. Panthulu
- Karnan (2021 film), 2021 Indian film by Mari Selvaraj
  - Karnan (soundtrack), its film score by Santhosh Narayanan

== See also ==
- Karna (disambiguation)
- Karn (disambiguation)
- Karana (disambiguation)
- Karan (disambiguation)
- Karnana (disambiguation)
