= Manca (disambiguation) =

Manca may refer to:

== People ==
- Yohan Manca (born 1989), a French film director, writer, actor and producer
- Bonaria Manca (1925-2020), Italian naïve art painter
- Pietrino Manca (1927-2001), Italian physicist.
- Manca Košir (1948-2024), a Slovenian journalist, philologist, politician, and film actress
- Francesco Manca (born 1966), Italian amateur astronomer.
- Enrico Manca (1931-2011), Italian politician
- Antonio Manca (1943-1997), Italian journalist and writer
- Albino Manca (1897-1976), Italian sculptor
- Vincenzo Manca (1916-2013), Italian painter
- Tiziano Manca (born 1970), Italian composer
- Federico Manca (born 1969), Italian chess master
- Luca Manca (born 1980), Italian motorcycle racer
- Dario Manca (born 1966), Italian taekwondo practitioner
- Davide Manca (born 1982), Italian film director
- Manca Izmajlova, Slovenian opera singer.

== Other ==
- Manca, a developmental stage (the post-larval juvenile) in some crustaceans.
- Manca, Karamanli, a village in Turkey
- 15460 Manca, an asteroid
- Acraea manca, butterfly of the Nymphalidae family
- Xaviera manca, insect of the Mantispidae family
- Lissonota manca, insect of the Ichneumonidae family
- Franco Manca, a sourdough pizza business.
