= Murgia motion =

Motion in California criminal law

A Murgia motion is a common motion in California criminal law based on the California Supreme Court decision Murgia v. Municipal Court (1975) 15 Cal.3d 286. The motion requests that the defendant's criminal charges be dismissed upon a showing of selective prosecution for improper purposes, amounting to a violation of the right to equal protection of law.
