= Carlo Fadda =

Italian jurist and politician

Carlo Fadda (1853–1931) was an Italian jurist and politician.

Fadda, a leading Italian expert of Roman law in general and the Pandects in particular, taught law in Macerata, Genoa and Naples. He published numerous monographs, textbooks and articles on civil law.

Moreover, Fadda was a member of numerous scholarly academies and governmental commissions. In 1912, he was appointed a senator.
