= Pietrino Manca =

Italian physicist

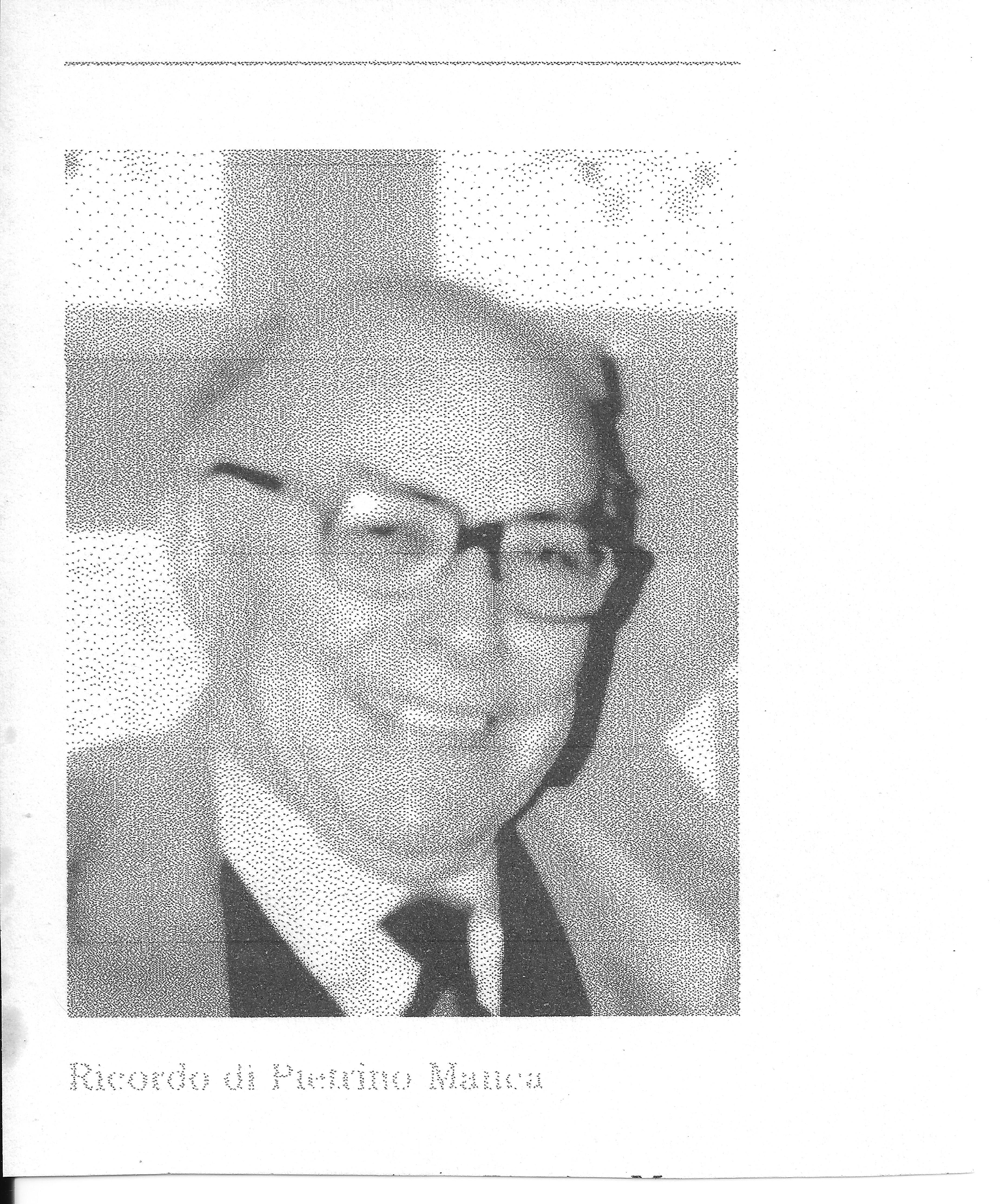

Pietrino Manca (1927 – 25 January 2001) was an Italian physicist. He studied chemistry at the University of Cagliari under Aldo Iandelli, and graduated in 1951. He later became a professor of the science of materials at the university, and head of its department of physics. He wrote a paper in 1961 describing the relation between gap energy and mean bond energy in semiconductors, later called "Manca's relation". He was nominated for a Nobel Prize in 1987. He died in Cagliari on 25 January 2001.
