= Piras =

Piras is a surname. Notable people with the surname include:

- Annalisa Piras, Italian film director and journalist
- Bernard Piras (1942–2016), French politician
- Mattia Piras (born 1992), Italian footballer
- Mikki Piras, American slalom canoeist
- Nicola Piras (born 1991), Italian footballer
- Raffaele Piras (1942–2014), Italian long jumper
- Sebastian Piras, Italian photographer

It can also mean

- Piras (mythology)
