= Pinna =

Pinna may refer to:

== Biology ==
- Pinna (anatomy), or auricle, the outer part of the ear
- Pinna (bivalve), a genus of molluscs
- Pinna (botany), a primary segment of a compound leaf

== People ==
=== Surname ===
- Christophe Pinna (born 1968), French martial artist
- Mattheus Pinna da Encarnaçao (1687–1764), Brazilian theologian
- Nicola Pinna (born 1974), Italian chemist
- Paola Pinna (born 1974), Italian politician
- Salvatore Pinna (born 1975), Italian football player
- Sandrine Pinna (born 1987), Taiwanese actress

=== Given name ===
- Pinna Nesbit (1896–1950), Canadian silent film actress

== Other uses ==
- Pinna, a children's podcasting company owned by Realm Media
- USS Pinna (SS-178), later Permit, a Porpoise-class U.S. Navy submarine
- Pinna Park, a fictional location in Super Mario Sunshine

== See also ==
- Pinner (disambiguation)
- De Pinna, an American clothes company 1885–1969
- Rosh Pinna, a settlement in Israel
  - Rosh Pina Airport
- Hypselodoris pinna (H. pinna), a species of sea slug
- Vietteania pinna (V. pinna), a species of moth
