= Kaira =

Kaira or KAIRA may refer to:

== Places ==
=== In India ===
- Kheda, also known as Kaira, a town in Gujarat, India
  - Kaira district
  - Kaira Agency, a former administrative unit
  - Kaira (Lok Sabha constituency)

== People with the name ==
- Mulaza Kaira (born 1984), Zambian musician
- Qamar Zaman Kaira (born 1960), Pakistani politician
- Tanveer Ashraf Kaira (born 1960), Pakistani politician
- Kaira Gong (born 1981), Singaporean singer

== Other uses ==
- The Gayiri people of central Queensland, also spelt Kaira
- Kaira (spider), a genus of spiders
- KAIRA, an astronomical observatory in Finland

== See also ==
- Karra (disambiguation)
- Khaira (disambiguation)
- Keira (disambiguation)
- Les Kaïra, a 2012 French film
