= Mereu =

Mereu is a surname. Notable people with the surname include:

- Antonio Mereu (1943–2026), Italian politician
- Salvatore Mereu (born 1965), Italian film director and screenwriter
