= Deiana (surname) =

Deiana is a surname. Notable people with the surname include:

- Damiana Deiana (born 1970), Italian footballer
- Elettra Deiana (1941–2023), Italian politician
- Paola Deiana (born 1985), Italian politician
- Robin Deiana (born 1990), French television personality

== See also ==
- Deiana
- Deianira
