= Kadri Tali (botanist) =

Estonian botanist

Kadri Tali (born 11 November 1966) is an Estonian botanist from Estonian University of Life Sciences.

She has described at least one taxon: Neotinea ustulata var. aestivalis (Kümpel) Tali, M.F.Fay & R.M.Bateman, 2006.
