= Nagendra Karri =

American film producer

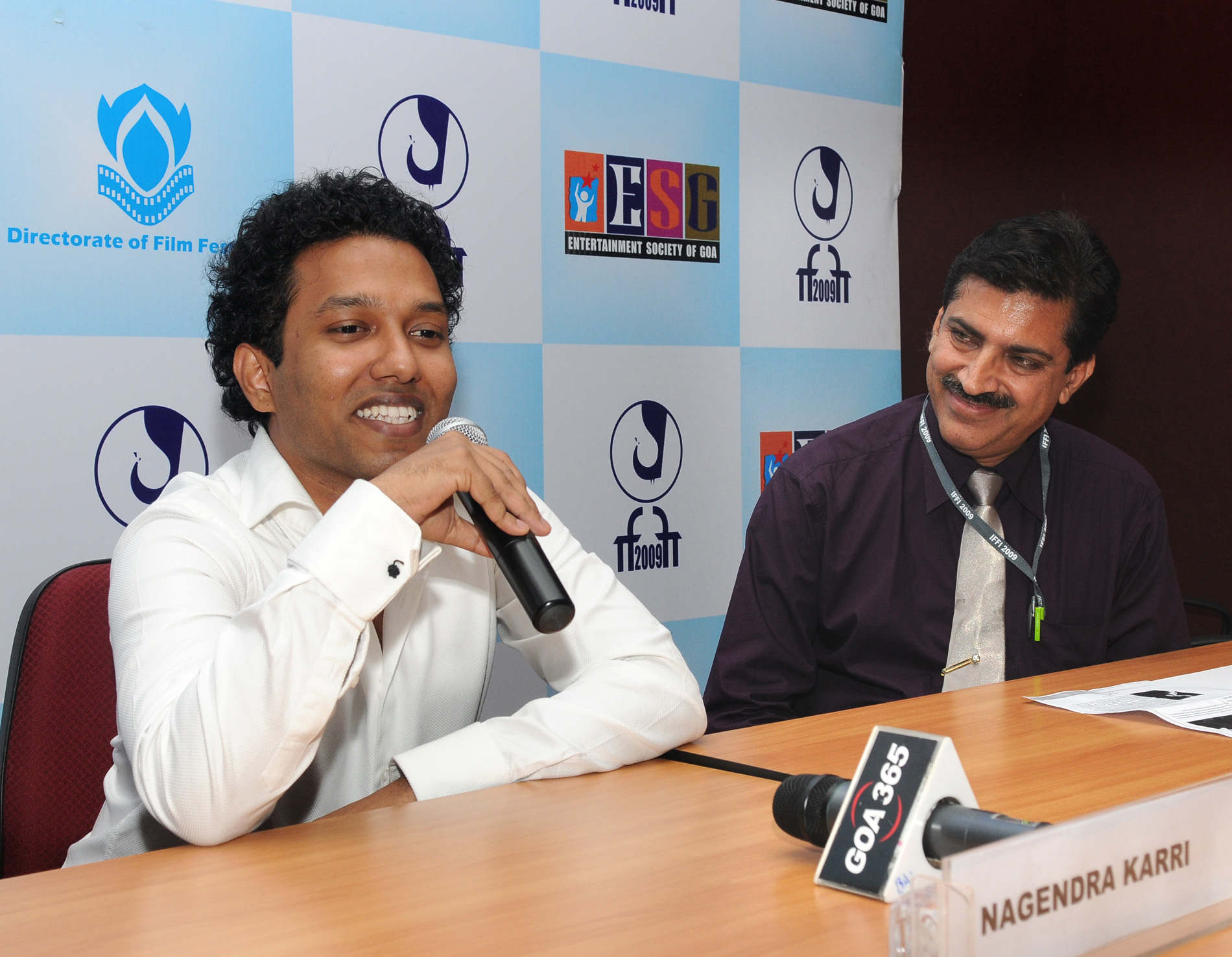
- Karri at the IFFI (2009)
- Born: November 28, 1988 (age 37); Vizag, Andhra Pradesh, India
- Education: Oregon State University
- Occupations: Film Director, Producer, Screenwriter, Entrepreneur.
- Years active: 2008–present

Nagendra Karri (born November 28, 1988) is an American film director, producer and screenwriter. He made his feature film directorial debut with the suspense thriller Where are you Sophia? (2010). He followed it with the 2015 film Mobster. Karri received widespread recognition in 2018 for writing social Cold War drama Stanley Cage that is being turned into a feature film to be released in 2020.

== Biography ==
Karri graduated with Bachelors in Computer Science & Engineering from JNTU, Andhra Pradesh. At 20, Karri moved to the United States and graduated with Masters in Computer Science & Electronics Engineering from Oregon State University, Oregon. He also has a Masters in film making and direction from University of California Berkeley, CA.

Nagendra Karri started his career as a business analyst before moving to New York to pursue a film career. He started Eternal Mind Productions in 2007 with personal funds and the backing of venture capitalists. His first few original film scripts include Mobster - A Call for the New Order, Where are you Sophia?, GATE 21, Chronicles of Kurukshetra, Human Aliens, and The Reds.

In 2009, Nagendra Karri directed and produced Where are you Sophia?, a psychological suspense thriller which premiered in the Cannes film festival. In 2012, Nagendra Karri formed the two hundred million "Al-Muhaymin" film fund. Eternal Mind Productions entered a partnership with the Al Muhaymin Film Fund to finance additional films. Karri joined Skanda Media group, and in 2016 announced plans to build a film studio in Louisiana.
