= Norton S. Karno =

American lawyer

Norton Stanley Karno (* 29. June 1936) is best known as an attorney for the Church of Scientology and its founder L. Ron Hubbard in the 1960s and 1970s, and whose name figures prominently in Scientology's history.

Karno is also well known as an active real estate investor. According to an article in the Colorado newspaper Daily Camera:

Karno or one of his corporations owns more than 500 pieces of real estate nationwide, including seven parcels in Boulder County, Colorado.

Karno is associated with the California firm of Karno, Schwartz & Friedman

== Hubbard's will ==
The 1979 version of Hubbard's Last Will and Testament named Karno as Executor:

...I nominate and appoint Norton S. Karno as Executor of this Will. Should Norton S. Karno be deceased or otherwise unable or unwilling to act as Executor, then I nominate and appoint Michael M. Smith as Executor of this Will. I acknowledge that I have been informed and am advised that a conflict of interest may exist as to Norton S. Karno in his capacity as Personal Representative hereunder and in his capacity as a general partner of a partnership in which I may have an interest at my death. I understand that Norton S. Karno could favour the partnership over the estate, and vice versa, which could prejudice the rights of the other. In view of the foregoing, I hereby waive any conflict of interest that may result in Norton S. Karno's service in the aforementioned capacities.

== Guardian's Office ==
During Scientology's days of the Guardian's Office, Norton Karno wrote a letter to the GO's David Gaiman, complaining that Hubbard was receiving no money from the Church of Scientology. Shortly thereafter, Karno was taken off Hubbard's will to be replaced by Norman Starkey as Executor.

Karno, along with fellow attorneys Meade Emory, James Q. Fisher, and Sherman and Stephen Lenske were reportedly involved in the Church's battle against the Internal Revenue Service during Operation Snow White.

== Digital Lightwave ==
In 1997, Karno was the second biggest stakeholder in Digital Lightwave, a Scientology-related company in Clearwater, Florida, during their initial public offering.

== See also ==
- Scientology and the legal system
- Scientology versus The Internet
