= Murru (surname) =

Murru is a surname. Notable people with the surname include:

- Marta Murru (born 2000), Italian synchronised swimmer
- Nicola Murru (born 1994), Italian footballer
