= Alessandro Dettori =

Italian footballer (born 1989)

Personal information
- Date of birth: December 26, 1989 (age 36)
- Height: 1.83 m (6 ft 0 in)
- Position: Midfielder

Team information
- Current team: Villacidrese

Youth career
- Cagliari

Senior career*
Years	Team	Apps	(Gls)
2009–	Cagliari	0	(0)
2009–	→ Villacidrese (loan)	6	(1)
- * Club domestic league appearances and goals as of 14:32, 11 May 2010 (UTC)

Alessandro Dettori (born December 26, 1989) is an Italian professional football player currently playing for Lega Pro Seconda Divisione team S.S. Villacidrese Calcio on loan from Cagliari Calcio.
