= Roberto Floris =

Argentine footballer

Personal information
- Full name: Roberto Ezequiel Floris
- Date of birth: 5 January 1986 (age 40)
- Place of birth: Santa Rosa, Argentina
- Height: 1.79 m (5 ft 10 1/2 in)
- Position: Defender

Team information
- Current team: Leandro N. Alem

Youth career
- All Boys SR
- Vélez Sársfield

Senior career*
Years	Team	Apps	(Gls)
2007–2008	Vélez Sársfield	3	(0)
2009	Everton	12	(0)
2009	All Boys SR	–	(–)
2010–2011	San Martín SJ	20	(0)
2011–2012	Tiro Federal	18	(0)
2012–2013	Instituto	18	(0)
2013–2014	Deportivo Merlo	37	(1)
2014–2015	Barracas Central	27	(0)
2016–2019	Tristán Suarez	99	(1)
2019–2021	Deportivo Merlo	45	(1)
2022	Atlas	37	(0)
2023	Cañuelas	23	(1)
2024–	Leandro N. Alem	41	(3)
- * Club domestic league appearances and goals as of 30 May 2025

Roberto Ezequiel Floris (5 January 1986 in Santa Rosa, La Pampa) is an Argentine footballer who plays for Leandro N. Alem.

== Career ==
Floris made his professional debut with Vélez Sársfield in 2007 under Ricardo Lavolpe. In 2009 he moved to Chile to play for Everton de Viña del Mar. In the second half of the same year, he returned to his homeland and played for All Boys de Santa Rosa at the Torneo Provincial La Pampa.

In 2024, Floris joined Leandro N. Alem in the Primera C Metropolitana.
