= Karna (disambiguation) =

Karna is one of the central characters of the Hindu epic Mahābhārata. Alternative transliterations include Karnaa, Karnan and Karn.

Karna may also refer to:

== People ==
- Karna (Kalachuri dynasty) (r. c. 1041-1073 CE), Indian king
- Karna (Chaulukya dynasty) (r. c. 1064–1092 CE), Indian king
- Karna (Vaghela dynasty) (r. c. 1296 – c. 1304), Indian king
- Karna Lidmar-Bergström (born 1940), Swedish geomorphologist

== Films ==
- Karnan (1964 film), an Indian Tamil-language film starring Sivaji Ganesan
- Karna (1986 film), an Indian Kannada-language film
- Karnaa, a 1995 film Indian Tamil-language film starring Arjun
- Karnan (2021 film), an Indian Tamil-language film starring Dhanush
- Karna (2023 film), an Indian Telugu-language film

== Places ==
- Karnal, a city in Haryana, India
- Karna, Iran, in West Azerbaijan Province, Iran
- Karna, Poland
- Karná, a village in the Humenne District of Slovakia
- Kärna, a locality in Kungälv Municipality, Sweden
- Kärnan, a medieval tower in southern Sweden
- Karna, a former name of Saada, Yemen

== Other uses ==
- Karna, an Iranian musical instrument in Persian traditional music
- Karna (Talmud), a Jewish Amora sage of Babylonia
- The common name of Platysace cirrosa, a Western Australian herb

== See also ==
- Maharathi Karna (disambiguation)
- Karnan (disambiguation)
- Karn (disambiguation)
- Karan (disambiguation)
- Karana (disambiguation)
- Karno (disambiguation)
- Karma (disambiguation)
- Karra (disambiguation)
