= Karan, Alsheyevsky District, Republic of Bashkortostan =

Karan Каран
- Village
- Location within Bashkortostan Location within Russia
- Coordinates: 54°02′N 54°44′E
- Country: Russia
- Region: Bashkortostan
- District: Alsheyevsky District
- Time zone: UTC+5:00

Karan (Russian: Каран; Bashkir: Ҡаран, Qaran) is a rural locality (a village) in Shafranovsky Selsoviet, Alsheyevsky District, Bashkortostan, Russia. The population was 76 as of 2010. There are 2 streets.

== Geography ==
Karan is located 23 km west of Rayevsky (the district's administrative centre) by road. Kolonka is the nearest rural locality.
