= Karri Padma Sree =

Indian politician (born 1976)

Karri Padma Sree (born 17 June 1976) is an Indian politician and humanitarian leader from Andhra Pradesh, serving as a Member of the Legislative Council (MLC) since August 2023. She was nominated under the Governor's quota during the tenure of the YSR Congress Party and took oath on 18 August 2023.

== Early life and education ==
Karri Padma Sree was born on 17 June 1976 to Sri Chetty Satyananda Rao and Smt. Adi Lakshmi in Jagannadhapuram, Kakinada. She has an extensive academic background, holding a Master of Arts (M.A.) and a Master of Philosophy (M.Phil.) in English, along with additional M.A. degrees in Political Science and Sociology. Her diverse education has contributed to her active role in social and political work, particularly focusing on the upliftment of marginalized communities.

== Career and social work ==
Padma Sree has been actively involved in social and community service for more than 20 years and has been a part of several organizations, especially focusing on women and fishermen. She served as the National President for Women in the National Association of Fishermen, the Women President of the Matsyakara Samkshema Samiti, and a member of AP SHAKTI and Vignyana Bharati, among other organizations. These roles have placed her at the forefront of welfare initiatives aimed at improving the lives of underprivileged communities, especially in coastal regions.

Her involvement in government programs is noteworthy. She participated in the 10th Sagar Parikrama program in 2024, a central government initiative that provides financial and infrastructural support to fishermen in Andhra Pradesh. During this program, Padma Sree played a crucial role in distributing government subsidies and aid, including equipment and loans, to boost the livelihoods of the fishing communities.

== Political career ==
On 10 August 2023, Karri Padma Sree was nominated to the Andhra Pradesh Legislative Council under the Governor's quota, as per Article 171 of the Constitution of India. Her nomination, during the tenure of the YSR Congress Party, was made by Governor Syed Abdul Nazeer. She took her oath of office on 18 August 2023. Her appointment followed the completion of the six-year terms of Chadipiralla Sivanatha Reddy and N M D Farooq.

Padma Sree joined Telugu Desam Party in the presence of Chief Minister Nara Chandrababu Naidu on 19 September 2025.

== Personal life ==
Karri Padma Sree is married to Karri Narayana Rao, a civil engineer by profession. Her husband has also been involved in politics, having served as the Youth President for Telugu Desam Party (TDP) in Kakinada City from 2000 to 2004, and as the State Joint Secretary for the YSR Congress Party (YSRCP) from 2014 to 2021.
