= Cherchi =

Cherchi is an Italian surname. People with the surname include:

- Salvatore Cherchi (born 1950), Italian politician
- Stefano Cherchi (2001–2024), Italian jockey
- Susanna Cherchi (born 1955), Italian politician

== See also ==
- Cherchir
- Chechar
