= Chessa =

Chessa is a surname. Notable people with the surname include:

- Aurelio Chessa (1913–1996), Italian anarchist, journalist and historian
- Carlo Chessa (1855–1912), Italian painter, printmaker and illustrator
- Dennis Chessa (born 1992), German footballer
- Gigi Chessa (1898–1935), Italian painter, architect, scenic designer and potter
- Luciano Chessa (born 1971), Italian composer, performer and musicologist
- Massimo Chessa (born 1995), Italian basketball player
- Pasquale Chessa (born 1947), Italian historian and journalist
