= Jiggs Kalra =

Indian chef, television presenter, and writer (1947–2019)

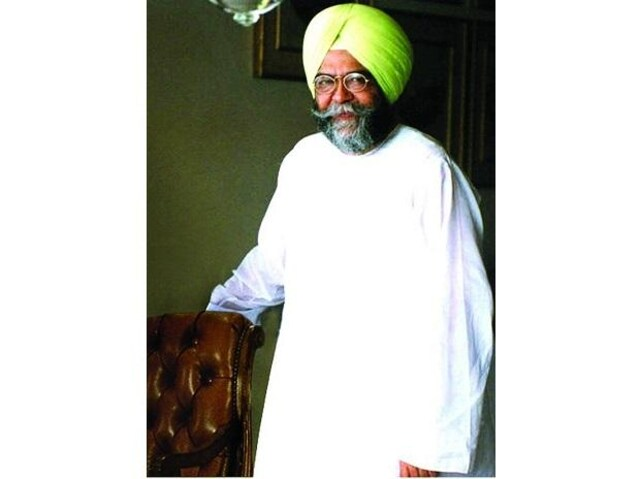
- Born: 21 May 1947; Delhi, India
- Died: 4 June 2019 (aged 72)
- Occupations: Indian Restaurateur, Food Columnist and Author
- Known for: Author of Prashad: Cooking with Indian Masters
- Children: Zorawar Kalra

Jaspal Inder Singh Kalra, better known as Jiggs Kalra (21 May 1947 – 4 June 2019), was an Indian restaurateur, food columnist, television host, and author. He was popularly known as the "czar of Indian cuisine".

== Career ==
Jaspal Inder Singh Kalra attended Mayo College, where he was captain of the basketball team where he may have acquired the nickname Jiggs. Soon after graduating, he started working as a trainee journalist at The Times of India in Bombay.

Kalra wrote about innovative restaurants, unusual ingredients and new and old techniques in Indian cuisine. With his encyclopaedic knowledge of North Indian cuisine, he was often the last word on authenticity; he was frequently sought out by restaurants and hotels to perfect recipes and develop menus.

He authored over 11 titles on Indian cuisine, including PRASHAD which is also considered as 'the bible' for chefs of today.

He was considered an ambassador of Indian cuisine worldwide.

In 2013, he opened a new restaurant, Masala Library, in Bandra, which the New York Times called "his temple of new-age Indian cuisine."

He was a recipient of the Lifetime Achievement Award from the Mayo College Heritage Society. He had been an advisor to the India Trade Promotion Organisation, advisor to the Ministry of Tourism, Government of Rajasthan and on the Board of Directors of MTR Foods. He represented India at the Peabody Hotel (Memphis in May festival, USA 1999), the First World Gourmet Summit in Singapore, the St Moritz Winter Festival in Switzerland, and the Third Food and Wine Festival in Singapore.

He anchored two television programs, Zaike Ka Safar and Daawat: An Invitation to Indian Cooking. Per the New York Times, "his efforts in particular to chronicle and promote Awadhi cuisine is said to have changed Indian restaurant menus across the world." He was inducted into the International Food and Beverage Forum Hall of Fame (2004) for his personal commitment and exceptional contribution to the international aspects of the F&B industry.

== Television ==
Daawat, one of India's first food shows, aired on Doordarshan in 1991 hosted by Jiggs Kalra. Each of the 32 episodes featured unique recipes made by a cook brought in by Kalra.

He also hosted Zaike ka Safar, a food-centric travelogue on Zee.

== Publications ==
Books authored by Jiggs Kalra include:

- 1986 - Prashad: Cooking with Indian Masters. ISBN 9788170230069.
- 2001 - Jiggs Kalra's Daawat: The Television Series with Pushpesh Pant. ISBN 9788177641493.
- 2003 - Kama Bhog: Foods of Love. ISBN 9788177644678.
- 2004 - Classic Cooking of Punjab. ISBN 9788177645668.
- 2005 - Jiggs Kalra`s Classic Cooking Of Avadh. ISBN 9788177645675.
- 2007 - Zaike Ka Safar: 100 Best of Jiggs Kalra. ISBN 9788184241235.
- 2016 - Classic Cooking of Rajasthan. ISBN 9788177647693.
