= Karta, Iran =

Karta كارتا
- Village
- Location within Iran
- Coordinates: 32°13′11″N 49°46′31″E
- Country: Iran
- Province: Khuzestan
- County: Izeh
- Bakhsh: Central
- Rural District: Pian

Population (2006)
  - Total: 732
- Time zone: UTC+3:30 (IRST)
  - Summer (DST): UTC+4:30 (IRDT)

Karta (Persian: كارتا, also Romanized as Kārtā) is a village in Pian Rural District, in the Central District of Izeh County, Khuzestan Province, Iran. At the 2006 census, its population was 732, in 137 families.
