= Cârța =

Cârța may refer to:

- Cârța, Harghita, a commune in Harghita County, Romania
- Cârța, Sibiu, a commune in Sibiu County, Romania
- Cârța Monastery
