= Pintus =

Pintus is a surname. Notable people with the surname include:

- Antonio Pintus (born 1926), Italian fitness coach
- Nicola Pintus (born 2005), Italian footballer
- Yosyp Pintus (born 1981), Ukrainian media proprietor and businessman
