= Kadri Ottis =

Estonian historian and politician

Kadri Ottis (born 19 April 1970) is an Estonian historian and politician. She was a member of VIII Riigikogu, representing the Estonian Coalition Party. Ottis was born in Pärnu. He graduated from the University of Tartu in 1995 with a degree in history.
