= Sanjay Kalra =

Indian medical doctor

- Born: 18 April 1970 (age 56); Ibadan, Nigeria
- Occupation: Endocrinologist
- Known for: Endocrinology
- Spouse: Bharti Kalra
- Children: Arnav Kalra, Kriti Kalra
- Parent(s): Hans Raj Kalra, Sudesh Kalra
- Awards: DAWN Award
- Website: web site

Sanjay Kalra (born 18 April 1970) is an Indian endocrinologist working at Bharti Hospital in Karnal, Haryana. Kalra is a former president of the Endocrine Society of India, the South Asian Federation of Endocrine Societies, and the Indian Professional Association for Transgender Health. He has also served on the executive council of the Research Society for the Study of Diabetes in India.

Kalra has more than 1,000 PubMed-indexed articles to his credit, and has contributed to strengthening bilateral and multilateral collaborations between various African and Asian countries in the field of endocrinology. He has developed several terms and concepts, including glucokathexis, lipokathexis, glucocrinology, ipocrinology, glycaemic hygiene, endocrine hygiene, and ergonomic endocrinology.

He also invented the GlucoCoper tool to assess psychological coping mechanisms in people with diabetes. In addition, he has published work on the concepts of diabetes fatigue syndrome, euthymia in diabetes, quaternary prevention in endocrinology, and quinary prevention.

== Education ==
Kalra graduated from Christian Medical College, Ludhiana. He completed his postgraduation (MD) in Medicine at Pandit Bhagwat Dayal Sharma Post Graduate Institute of Medical Sciences, Rohtak, and his fellowship (DM) in Endocrinology and Metabolism at the All India Institute of Medical Sciences, New Delhi.

== Professional contribution ==
Kalra established Bharti Hospital in Karnal, which offers clinical care, research, training, and education in endocrinology. As executive editor (2011–15), he played a role in strengthening the Indian Journal of Endocrinology and Metabolism (IJEM), which became recognised as India's second-highest-ranked scientific journal according to Google Metrics. He also serves as executive editor of Thyroid Research and Practice and associate editor of Diabetic Medicine (UK). In addition, he is an international advisory board member for several journals, including US Endocrinology, the Sri Lankan Journal of Diabetes, Endocrinology and Metabolism (SLJDEM), the Journal of Pakistan Medical Association, and the Journal of Diabetes and Endocrinology Association of Nepal (JDEAN).

As a founder member and past president, Kalra has contributed to the establishment and growth of the South Asian Federation of Endocrine Societies (SAFES). His contributions have been recognised in neighbouring countries, and he has been awarded Fellowship and Life Membership of the Sri Lanka College of Endocrinologists (SLCE), as well as life membership of the Pakistan Endocrine Society (PES).

== Contribution to science and evidence base of insulin therapy ==
As of January 2024, Kalra has more than 23,000 citations of his publications, with an h-index of 68 and an i10-index of 439. His primary area of focus has been insulin therapy.

=== Basal ===
Kalra has remained updated with advancements in insulin therapy and has authored several articles on the evolution of basal insulins and their patient-centred use in various clinical settings.

He has also written on the use of basal insulin in special populations such as paediatric groups and pregnant women.

His research also includes strategies for intensifying basal insulin therapy and optimising injection techniques.

In addition to work on type 2 diabetes, Kalra has written extensively on insulin use in type 1 diabetes.

=== Premixed ===
Appropriate patient selection is an essential component of successful premixed insulin therapy. Kalra was the lead author of a comprehensive review developed with collaborators from more than 25 countries.

He has also published extensively on the use of premixed insulin during Ramadan and on its role in special situations, from initiation to intensification.

He has also published updates on premixed insulins, including real-world evidence regarding newer co-formulations.

=== Motivation, technique, and counselling ===
Kalra has led several original studies examining insulin usage practices in South Asia.

Kalra has also led multiple manuscripts providing regional best practices and recommendations related to insulin delivery devices, injection techniques, monitoring, and complication management.

He was also the lead author of expert recommendations for the use of insulin in India, published in 2017.

=== Novel concepts ===
Kalra has introduced several novel and easily understandable concepts related to insulin therapy, including insulin hesitancy, insulin stewardship, patient-friendly intensification, insulin-related emotions, social marketing, insulin flexibility, insulin misperceptions, insulin taxonomy, insulin objectivity, insulin triage, and "smarter" insulin therapy.

These concepts aim to build confidence in patients initiating insulin therapy and support general practitioners in clinical decision-making.

=== Person-centred approach ===
Person-centred clinical management is widely recognised as an effective and sustainable model for chronic disease care.

Kalra has extensively applied person-centred principles to insulin initiation and intensification.

He has also examined barriers to insulin use, especially in low- and middle-income countries, and suggested frameworks ("bridges") to address these challenges.

Kalra has been lead author for several multinational panels and evidence-based recommendations on individualising time-in-range goals, and on administration techniques, including work published in Mayo Clinic Proceedings.

== Contribution to obesity science ==
=== Epidemiology ===
Kalra has been the lead or senior author of several epidemiological studies in the field of obesity. In addition to using national datasets, he has served as a regional lead investigator for Haryana in the ICMR-funded INDIAB Study. Multiple papers from this cohort have been published, including national obesity prevalence data in The Lancet and several other studies.

He has also contributed to studies assessing the prevalence of obesity-related comorbidities, including steatotic liver disease. Kalra is the senior author of a major analysis from the Comprehensive National Nutrition Survey, reporting the prevalence of childhood obesity in India.

From the Longitudinal Ageing Study in India, he has also led work reporting the first national estimates of sarcopenia and sarcopenic obesity in older adults.

=== Simplified clinical approach ===
Kalra has developed several clinically applicable concepts that simplify obesity management, including bariatric triage, gut guardianship, medical gastronomy, and obesity-friendly language.

He has addressed the pathogenesis, comorbidities, and complications of obesity in multiple review papers, including a recent review on MASLD in Endocrine Clinics of North America.

Several papers led by Kalra serve as practical guides for clinicians new to obesity management, outlining stepwise protocols for setting up obesity clinics and evaluating and managing obesity.

=== Lifestyle and drug management ===
Kalra has consistently emphasised the importance of lifestyle interventions in obesity management. He has highlighted the use of traditional and indigenous activities to improve physical function in people living with obesity.

He has also worked extensively on nutrition education and research. Kalra has advocated for the recognition of "mega-nutrients" such as fibre and water, which are consumed in significantly larger quantities than macronutrients. He is also a co-author of the national consensus statement on fibre intake in India.

Person-centred obesity care is another major focus of his work. His publications emphasise that obesity management requires individualised strategies rather than a uniform approach.

Kalra has remained closely engaged with developments in GLP-1 receptor agonists and has published periodic updates as new evidence has emerged.

=== Sarcopenia and sarcopenic obesity ===
In a recently published scoping review led by Kalra, the current evidence linking sarcopenic obesity with cardiovascular disease has been summarised, along with proposed preventive and therapeutic strategies.

He has published extensively to enable the diagnosis of sarcopenia and sarcopenic obesity in resource-constrained settings and has led the development of a South Asian consensus document on the subject.

=== Advocacy and guidelines ===
Kalra has been the lead or senior author of several national and regional guidelines on obesity and nutrition.

He has published several papers highlighting the need for advocacy to address the obesity epidemic in India, including issues of gender disparity. He has also advocated strategies to prevent obesity in the Indian population.

Advocacy efforts beyond India include publications highlighting regional challenges and the need for greater collaboration among South Asian countries. He is also a co-author of expert recommendations on the pre-operative and post-operative medical management of patients undergoing bariatric surgery.

=== Innovation and novel ideas ===
Kalra coined the term "barocrinology" to describe the endocrine science of obesity. He has since proposed numerous concepts related to "baro-health" and serves as a section editor in the barocrinology division of a major South Asian PubMed-indexed journal.

His contributions include the Barocene Era, barometric nervosa, bariatric pyramid, baromania, baro-bullying, lipokathexis, the Ominous Octet of Obesity, and viewing obesity as a communicable disease—concepts intended to provide simplified frameworks for understanding complex obesity science.

He has also developed simple, implementable behavioural therapy models for obesity care.

Kalra frequently draws analogies between obesity management and concepts from quantum physics, traditional customs, and religious texts. Several of these ideas have been widely cited and discussed.

== Research and publications ==
Kalra has emphasised the importance of person-centred care for over a decade through his reviews, research, and communications in various national and international journals. One of his earlier citations on this topic dates back to a paper he led in 2013, in which he described the role of a person-centred approach during insulin initiation and intensification—one of the most challenging aspects of diabetes management.^{79} Although a substantial body of his work has focused on diabetes,^{77,79} he has also applied the principles of person-centred care to other chronic metabolic disorders, including obesity, hypogonadism, and hypothyroidism.^{78}

Kalra has written on menopause distress and late-onset male hypogonadism, simplifying their definitions and describing person-centric thresholds, targets, tools, and techniques for management.^{167,168} He is also the lead author of a paper titled Thyroid Tantrums in Teenagers, which highlights the variability in endocrine presentations during adolescence and addresses management, assessment, testing techniques, associated biomedical illness, and training. His work extends across all age groups; for instance, he has published geriatric goalposts on independence and interdependence, emphasising the importance of person-centric care in older adults.

Key principles of person-centred care highlighted in Kalra's publications include effective communication with patients.^{65,102} Other core principles include ensuring that therapy is affordable and that the management plan is feasible for the patient. His publications also highlight the importance of patient happiness, as well as the well-being of the treating physician. Strengthening family support, advancing social acceptance, and addressing patient emotions are other elements he considers essential to delivering person-centred care.^{69} He has also highlighted the value of indigenous methods for lifestyle modification and personal hygiene in improving person-centred care.^{123,166}

Kalra has proposed several frameworks to help clinicians integrate the above principles into routine practice.^{129,161,162} These frameworks have been widely cited. In collaboration with researchers in Morocco, he published the SURE framework outlining the “glycaemic personality” of patients, enabling more tailored therapeutic choices. In another publication, he described the Motivation–Opportunity–Capability (MOC) model for obesity care, underscoring the importance of understanding patient behaviour and aligning therapeutic approaches with their opportunities and capabilities.

Kalra’s contribution to original research includes participation in multicentric international collaborative studies that have advanced understanding of person-centred management.

In the three-year, pan-India longitudinal study on diabetes outcomes (the LANDMARC trial), data are being collected on trends in diabetic complications, physician treatment strategies, and correlations between treatment, control, and complications in the Indian setting. The findings are expected to help identify disease burden, early-onset complications, dose-titration patterns, and inform person-centred care approaches, thereby guiding resource allocation by public health agencies.^{182}

Another major multicentric international collaborative study, the DAWN (Diabetes Attitudes Wishes and Needs) project, demonstrated how cross-national benchmarking using psychometrically validated indicators can help identify gaps and best practices, enabling changes to improve outcomes for people living with diabetes.^{183,184}
