= Kamra (surname) =

Kamra is an Indian Khatri surname.

== Notable people ==
People with the surname Kamra include:

- Aahana Kumra, Indian actress
- Josh Kumra (born 1991), English singer and songwriter
- Kritika Kamra (born 1988), Indian actress.
- Kunal Kamra (born 1988), Indian standup comedian.

== See also ==
- Karra (name)
- Kamara (surname)
