= Natalka Karpa =

Ukrainian singer (born 1981)

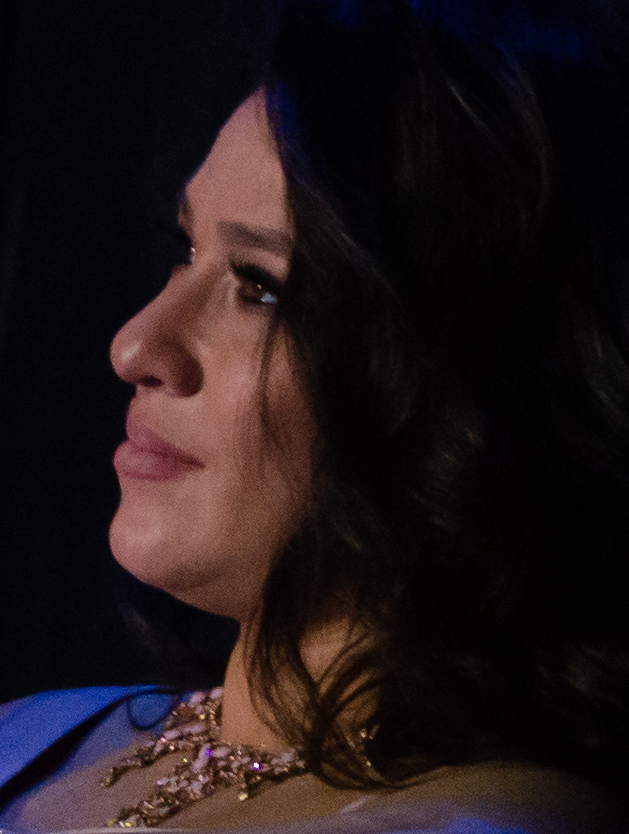

Background information
- Born: Nataliya Semenivna Karpa; 14 August 1981 (age 45)
- Origin: Dobromyl, Lviv Oblast, Ukrainian SSR
- Genres: Pop, House
- Occupations: singer, TV-host
- Instrument: voice
- Years active: 1999–present
- Label: KARPARATION
- Website: http://natalkakarpa.tilda.ws/ international eng

Natalka Karpa (Ukrainian: Наталка Карпа; born 14 August 1981), born Nataliya Semenivna Karpa (Ukrainian: Наталія Семенівна Карпа) is a Ukrainian singer, TV-host, and the "Distinguished Artist of Ukraine" (2009). She is closely associated with the city of Lviv.

== Biography ==
Was born in the small city of Dobromyl in Ukraine, near the Polish border. She was born into a musical family; her grandmother once sang in a choir, while father was a professional musician. When Karpa was five her parents bought her a piano and later she enrolled in a music school.

She started to sing in a public choir "Pysanka" and later became a solo singer for the vocal-instrumental ensemble "Halytska perlyna" (Halych Perl) headed by Lesya Salistra.

Finished her school with a gold medal and has two higher education diplomas: Lviv Medical University (former medical campus of Lviv University) and the English Philology of Lviv Polytechnic. During her studies in universities Karpa was a solo singer for a medical jazz band "Medicus".

She participated in numerous Ukrainian festivals. Her first the most successful hit was a song "Kalyna – ne verba".

Along her singing career, Karpa also is an anchor lady for few TV-programs such as "Ekstremalnyi weekend" (NTA) and "Vidkryi sebe" (Television and Radio company "Lyuks"). Together with her producer Yaroslav Stepanyk she found her own producing center "KARPARATION" (until 2001 "Nika").

Natalka Karpa also founded a line of cosmetics and released her own perfumes.

== Albums ==
=== History – 2007 ===
- 2007 Moon Records Ukraine/Lavina Music

=== The Best of – 2013 ===
- 2013 Moon Records Ukraine

=== Ukrainian Christmas Carols – 2014 ===
- 2014 Moon Records Ukraine

== See also ==
- Natalka Karpa on Apple Music
