= Meloni =

Meloni is an Italian surname. Notable people with the name include:

== Arts and entertainment ==
- Astrid Meloni (born 1982), Italian actress
- Christopher Meloni (born 1961), American actor
- Claude Méloni (born 1940), French baritone
- Marco Meloni, Italian Renaissance painter
- Roberto Meloni (singer) (born 1977), Italian singer

== Politics ==
- Arianna Meloni (born 1975), Italian politician
- Assunta Meloni (born 1951), Sammarinese politician
- Giorgia Meloni (born 1977), Italian politician and Prime Minister of Italy since 2022

== Sport ==
- Eugenio Meloni (born 1994), Italian athlete, high jump specialist
- Franco Meloni, Italian racing driver
- Giordano Meloni (born 1983), Italian footballer (plays for Flaminia Civita Castellana)
- Marcus Meloni (born 2000), Brazilian footballer (plays for Sharjah)
- Roberto Meloni (born 1981), Italian judoka

== See also ==
- Melone (disambiguation)
- Melloni
