= Hayâlî =

Ottoman poet (1500?–1557)

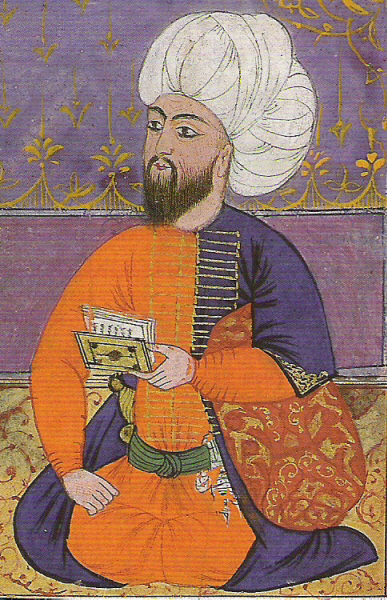
Hayâlî (1500?–1557)

Hayâlî (خيالى) (1500?–1557) was the pen name (Ottoman Turkish: ﻡﺨﻠﺺ mahlas) of an Ottoman Turkish poet.

== Life ==
The exact birth date of the poet is not known, however, it is known that he was born during the reign of Sultan Bâyezîd II (1481–1512), in the city of Yenice-i Vardar in Macedonia. His real name was Mehmed (محمد).

Apparently, Mehmed was interested in poetry from a very young age, as the biographer ‘Âşık Çelebi recounts that he read the Bôstân ("The Orchard") and the Gülistân ("The Rose Garden") of the Persian poet Sa‘di in his youth. At some time during his youth, the wandering Sufi dervish Baba ‘Alî Mest-i ‘Ajem ("Father ‘Alî the Drunkard of Persia") came to Yenice-i Vardar with his disciples, and Mehmed was attracted enough to him to leave home, join the group, and follow Baba ‘Alî to Istanbul, the Ottoman capital. During the journey, he was further educated in poetry, as well as in Sufi thought and practice, by Baba ‘Alî.

In Istanbul, one of the city's chief judges, Sarı Gürz Nûreddîn Efendi, saw the young Mehmed together with Baba ‘Alî's band of dervishes, and—considering this inappropriate for the boy—he removed him from among them and entrusted him to the care of one of the city's police chiefs. Here, he continued his education and also began to attract notice as a poet, writing under the name Hayâlî ("the Imaginative").

Eventually, Hayâlî came to the attention of İbrâhîm Pasha—the Ottoman Grand Vizier at the time—and through him to the attention of Sultan Süleymân I. He became one of the sultan's favored poets, was supported by him through the patronage system in place in the Ottoman court at the time, and accompanied the sultan's forces in their siege of the island of Rhodes in 1522 and the conquest of the city of Baghdad from the Persian Safavid Empire in 1534; during this latter campaign, Hayâlî is rumored to have met the great Azerbaijani poet Fuzûlî. For his poetic talents, Hayâlî was given a number of informal titles: Melik-üş-şuarâ ("King of poets"), Diyâr-ı Rûm'un Sultân-ı Şuarâsı ("Sultan of the Poets of Rûm"), and Hayâlî-i meşhûr ("Hayâlî the famous"). Hayâlî's popularity with the Grand Vizier and the sultan, however, also earned him many enemies among other poets, and he was frequently the subject of lampoons.

After the fall and execution of Hayâlî's main patron İbrâhîm Pasha in 1536, and the ascension to the post of Grand Vizier of Rüstem Pasha—who was less tolerant towards the somewhat decadent lifestyle of the court—Hayâlî's life became more difficult, and eventually he requested and was given the position of sancakbey, or governor of a provincial district, outside of Istanbul, near to the Thracian city of Edirne; this position allowed him to add the title bey to his name, and he is still often known as "Hayâlî Bey". He died in Edirne in the year 1557.
