= Florissant Township, St. Louis County, Missouri =

Township in St. Louis County, Missouri, U.S.

Coordinates: 38°47′41″N 90°19′3″W

Florissant Township is a township in St. Louis County, in the U.S. state of Missouri. Its population was 34,637 as of the 2010 census.
