= Porcu =

Porcu may refer to:

- rivers in Romania:
  - Porcu, a tributary of the Bâsculița in Buzău County
  - Valea Porcului, a tributary of the Sădurel in Sibiu County
  - Porcu, a tributary of the Tărâia in Gorj County
  - Porcu (Jiu), a tributary of the Jiu in Gorj County

== See also ==
- Porcula, a genus of Suidae
- Porcus (disambiguation)
