= Kartaz =

Kartaz كرتز
- Village
- Location within Iran
- Coordinates: 32°15′15″N 49°37′27″E
- Country: Iran
- Province: Khuzestan
- County: Andika
- Bakhsh: Central
- Rural District: Shalal and Dasht-e Gol

Population (2006)
  - Total: 58
- Time zone: UTC+3:30 (IRST)
  - Summer (DST): UTC+4:30 (IRDT)

Kartaz (Persian: كرتز; also known as Kārtā and Kartar) is a village in Shalal and Dasht-e Gol Rural District, in the Central District of Andika County, Khuzestan Province, Iran. At the 2006 census, its population was 58, in 11 families.
