= Kardar, Minab =

Kardar كردر
- Village
- Location within Iran
- Coordinates: 27°04′40″N 57°02′23″E
- Country: Iran
- Province: Hormozgan
- County: Minab
- Bakhsh: Central
- Rural District: Band-e Zarak

Population (2006)
  - Total: 1,592
- Time zone: UTC+3:30 (IRST)
  - Summer (DST): UTC+4:30 (IRDT)

Kardar (Persian: كردر) is a village in Band-e Zarak Rural District, in the Central District of Minab County, Hormozgan Province, Iran. At the 2006 census, its population was 1,592, in 349 families.
