= Kasra =

Kasra is a variant of the Persian name Khosrow. It may refer to:

== Given name ==
- Kasra Anghaee (born 1967), Iranian-Swiss poet
- Kasra Naji, Iranian journalist
- Kasra Nouri (born 1990), Iranian rights activist and blogger

== Surname ==
- Leila Kasra (1939–1989), Iranian poet
- Mona Kasra, Iranian-American academic

== Other ==
- Kasra or Kasrah, a diacritic sign in Arabic script
- Taq Kasra, a Sassanid-era Persian monument

== See also ==
- Kesra, a town and commune in the Siliana Governorate, Tunisia
- Karra (disambiguation)
- Kesra, a type of bread in Algerian cuisine
