= Ramesh Karri =

- Education: University of California, San Diego, University of Hyderabad, Andhra University
- Occupations: Professor of Electrical and Computer Engineering at New York University Polytechnic School of Engineering

Ramesh Karri is a researcher specializing in trustworthy hardware, high assurance nanoscale integrated circuits, architectures and systems. He is a Professor of Electrical and Computer Engineering at New York University Polytechnic School of Engineering. Additionally, Karri is the co-founder of Trust-Hub, Embedded Security Challenge and NYU CRISSP center, the IEEE/ACM Symposium on Nanoscale Architectures and the IEEE Computer Society Technical Committee on Nanoscale Architectures. He is a member of NYU WIRELESS. He was awarded the Humboldt Fellowship and the National Science Foundation CAREER Award.

== Career ==
Karri received his PhD in Computer Science and Engineering from the University of California, San Diego. In 2011, he was appointed as a Professor of Electrical and Computer Engineering at New York University Polytechnic School of Engineering. Karri and a team of researchers from the New York University Polytechnic School of Engineering and the University of Connecticut designed new techniques to protect computer systems from Trojan viruses in November 2011. The research improved the ability to conceal valuable but vulnerable information from malicious computer programs. In November 2013, Ozgur Signanolu collaborated with Karri to improve the design for electronic chips and reduce security threats including counterfeit chips and Trojan viruses. Karri contributed to the paper "Security Analysis of Integrated Circuit Camouflaging." In December 2013, it was recognized as the Best Student Paper at the Association for Computing Machinery Conference on Computer and Communications Security. Karri was appointed as DAC’s chair of security in 2014.

== Publications ==
- R. Karri, J. Rajendran, and K. Rosenfeld, "Trojan Taxonomy", a book chapter in "Introduction to Hardware Security and Trust" edited by Mohammad Tehranipoor and Cliff Wang, Springer, New York, USA, 2011, pp. 325–338.
- R. Karri and K. Rosenfeld, "Security and Testing" a book chapter in "Introduction to Hardware Security and Trust" edited by Mohammad Tehranipoor and Cliff Wang, Springer, New York, USA, 2011, pp. 385–409.
- R. Karri and D. Goodman (EDITORS), "System-level power optimization for wireless multimedia communication" Kluwer Academic Publishers, ISBN 1-4020-7204-X. This includes the following chapter co-authored with my student.
- R. Karri and P. Mishra, "Optimizing IPSec for energy-efficient secure wireless systems" a book chapter in "System-level power optimization for wireless multimedia communication" Kluwer Academic Publishers, 2002, pp. 133–152.
- J. Rajendran, H. Zhang, C. Zhang, G.S. Rose, Y. Pino, O. Sinanoglu and R. Karri, Fault Analysis-based Logic Encryption, accepted in IEEE Transactions on Computers.
- X. Guo and R. Karri, "Recomputing with Permuted Operands - A Concurrent Error Detection Approach", accepted in IEEE Transactions on Computer-Aided Design.
- J. Rajendran, A. K. Kanuparthi, M. Zahran, S. Addepalli, G. Ormazabal, and R. Karri, "Securing processors against insider attacks: a circuit microarchitecture co-design approach", IEEE Design and Test Magazine, Vol. 30, Issue 2, pp. 35–44, 2013
- S. Kannan, J. Rajendran, O. Sinanoglu, and R. Karri, "Sneak Path Testing of Crossbar-based Resistive Random Access Memories," IEEE Transactions on Nanotechnology, vol.12, no.3, pp. 413–426, May 2013.
- G.S. Rose, H. Manem, J. Rajendran, R. Karri and R. Pino, "Leveraging Memristive Systems in the Construction of Digital Logic Circuits", Proceedings of the IEEE, Vol. 100, Issue 6, pp. 2033–2049, 2012.
