= Kadri Altay =

Turkish general and politician (1921–2013)

Member of the Grand National Assembly
- In office 24 November 1983 – 16 October 1987
- Constituency: Antalya - 1983

Personal details
- Born: 1921 Kastoria, Greece
- Died: 13 January 2013 (aged 91–92) Ankara, Turkey
- Children: 2

Military service
- Allegiance: Turkey
- Branch/service: Turkish Army
- Rank: Brigadier General

Kadri Altay (1921 – 13 January 2013) was a Turkish brigadier general and politician.

He served as a member of the Grand National Assembly of Turkey in its 17th legislative term from 1983 to 1987.
