= Jay Kalra =

Canadian physician, clinical researcher and educator

Professor Jay Kalra FRCPC
- Born: Jawahar Kalra; April 2, 1949 (age 77); Aligarh, India
- Education: Aligarh Muslim University; All India Institute of Medical Sciences; Memorial University of Newfoundland; University of Ottawa
- Occupations: Physician; Professor of Pathology and Lab Medicine
- Organization: University of Saskatchewan

Jawahar Kalra is a Canadian physician, clinical researcher and educator. Kalra is a professor at the Department of Pathology and Laboratory Medicine at the University of Saskatchewan, a Fellow of the Royal College of Physicians and Surgeons of Canada, the Canadian Academy of Clinical Biochemistry, the Canadian Academy of Health Sciences, Life Fellow of the Royal Society of Medicine, UK and a Canadian Certified Physician Executive Leader (CCPE). Kalra served as a member of the Board of Governors University of Saskatchewan and currently serves on the Board of Directors, Council of Canadian Academies (CCA).

== Early life and education ==
Born in Aligarh, India, he began his post-secondary studies at the Aligarh Muslim University earning a BSc in Chemistry and Biology in 1967 followed by his MSc in biochemistry in 1969. He joined All India Institute of Medical Sciences as a junior research fellow in Biochemistry in 1969. He continued his studies at Memorial University in Newfoundland earning a MSc degree in 1972, a PhD in 1976, and his MD in 1981. He did residency training at the University of Ottawa and was the senior resident in the Departments of Medicine and Laboratory Medicine at Ottawa Civic and Ottawa General Hospitals.

== Career ==
Kalra is a Fellow of the Royal College of Physicians and Surgeons of Canada, the Canadian Academy of Clinical Biochemistry, Founding Fellow of the Canadian Academy of Health Sciences, a Life Fellow of the Royal Society of Medicine, UK, and a Canadian Certified Physician Executive (CCPE).

In 1985 he accepted a position with the Department of Pathology at the University of Saskatchewan and Royal University Hospital.

Kalra served as the Head of the Department of Pathology in the College of Medicine (1991-2000) and Head of the Department of Laboratory Medicine for the Saskatoon Health Region (1994-2000). Kalra has served as national president of numerous medical associations and scientific societies including the Canadian Association of Medical Biochemists (1993–95), Intersociety Council of Laboratory Medicine (1994–96), Canadian Chairs of Pathology and Laboratory Medicine (1995-2000), Canadian Association of Pathologists (1999-2000), and of the American College of Angiology (2004). He was a founding member (1991) and Director (1998-2000) of the Saskatchewan Stroke Research Centre. He has served on various committees of the College of Medicine and the University of Saskatchewan including Chair of University Planning and Priority Committee (2008–10) and the Chair of the University of Saskatchewan Representative Council (2011–16). He has also served on the board of directors of the Canadian Academy of Health Sciences (CAHS), as a member of the Council on Health Policy and Economics, Canadian Medical Association (CMA), the Legislative Committee, Saskatchewan Medical Association (SMA) and as a council member of the Canadian Society for Clinical Investigation (CSCI). Kalra currently serves as member of the Representative Assembly (RA), and member of the Legislation and Policy Committee (LPC) of the SMA.

Kalra is a leader and community builder in Saskatoon Folkfest, Multicultural Council of Saskatchewan, Hindu Society (Hindu Temple) of Saskatchewan, Saskatchewan Intercultural Association (SIA), Rotary Clubs in Saskatoon, Heart and Stroke Foundation of Saskatchewan, Literacy Foundation and the Canadian National Institute for the Blind (CNIB). Kalra has worked in building the social, cultural, intercultural understanding and strengthening the fabric of multiculturalism in Saskatoon, Saskatchewan and beyond. He has been called a “Cultural and Diversity Ambassador”.

== Research ==
Kalra's research focuses on establishing the best practices and guidelines for quality care and patient safety, medical error and disclosure policy, total quality management programs, artificial intelligence, and laboratory utilization in health care. Kalra is author of a book entitled “Medical Errors and Patient Safety – Strategies to Reduce and Disclose Medical Errors and Improve Patient Safety.” He has been a champion in establishing a non-punitive “no-fault model” to address clinical/medical errors, and in developing educational programs and clinical guidelines reflecting evidence-based medicine. Kalra is also actively involved in the field of Artificial Intelligence and its implications in healthcare, laboratory medicine, and quality improvement. Kalra has received several research grants and has published more than 120 peer reviewed articles and 250 research abstracts.

In November 2017, Kalra co‑authored a book review in The Lancet about the book Better Now: Six Big Ideas to Improve Health Care for All Canadians. In February 2019, The Lancet retracted the review, stating that “substantial passages… match parts of a review of the same book by André Picard published in January 2017”. Earlier drafts had cited Picard’s review, but later versions omitted the citation while leaving similar text. The University of Saskatchewan stated it “takes this issue extremely seriously” and launched an initial review under its Responsible Conduct of Research policy to determine whether a formal hearing was required.

== Honours ==
- Saskatchewan Health Research Foundation Achievement Award in Clinical Research, 2005
- Queen Elizabeth II Diamond Jubilee Medal, 2012
- Canadian Association for Medical Education (CAME/ACEM) Certificate of Merit Award for Outstanding Contributions to Medical Education, 2012
- RBC – Top 25 Canadian Immigrant Awards, 2013 Winner
- Citizen of the Year for 2015 by CTV News Saskatoon.
- Recipient of Canada's Paul Yuzyk Award for Multiculturalism-Lifetime Achievement in 2015
- One of 60 Influential Canadians over 60 recognized in a Senior Living blog, A Place for Mom chose 60 extraordinary Canadians over 60 who are esteemed for their contributions to society
- “Saskatchewan Centennial Leadership Award” for outstanding contribution to province 2015
- Grasswood Canada 150 Award Recipient
- Recipient, 10 University of Saskatchewan (U of S) Canada 150 Citizen, University of Saskatchewan, 2017
- Queen Elizabeth II Platinum Jubilee Medal, 2023
