= Cossu =

Cossu is an Italian surname. Notable people with the surname include:

- Alessio Cossu (born 1986), Italian footballer
- Andrea Cossu (disambiguation), multiple people
- Antoni Cossu (1927–2002), Italian novelist and poet
- Francesco Cossu, Italian rower
- Scott Cossu, a new-age pianist
