= Kare =

Kare or KARE may refer to:

- Kare (Žitorađa), a village in Serbia
- Kare language (disambiguation), several languages with the name
- Kare (surname), a surname (including a list of people with the name)
- Kare Kauks (born 1961), Estonian singer
- Kåre or Kaare, a common Scandinavian given name
- KARE (TV), a television station in Minneapolis
- KAIR (AM), a radio station in Kansas, United States, which used the call sign KARE from 1939 to 1986
- Käre, village in Setomaa Parish, Võru County, Estonia

== See also ==
- Kaare, Estonia, a village
- Kare-kare
- Karey (disambiguation)
- Karie (disambiguation)
- Kil-Kare
- Care (disambiguation)
- Karre
- Kareh (disambiguation)
