= Cura =

Cura or CURA may refer to:

== Music ==
- Cura (album), 2018 Keys N Krates release
- Cura (instrument), Turkish musical instrument

== Organizations ==
- Center for Urban and Regional Analysis (CURA), Ohio State University
- Institute on Culture, Religion, and World Affairs (CURA), founded by Peter L. Berger at Boston University
- Cambridge University Rifle Association (CURA), a sports team of the University of Cambridge

== People ==
- Cura (surname), a surname of Latin origin
- Cura Ocllo (died 1539), Inca queen

== Other uses ==
- Cura (flatworm), genus of flatworms in the family Dugesiidae
- Cura (mythology), ancient Roman divinity whose name means "Care" or "Concern"
- Cura (software), Open source 3D print preparation software developed by Ultimaker
- Cura River, Venezuela

== See also ==
- Cure (disambiguation)
- La Cura (disambiguation)
- Villa de Cura, town in Venezuela
- Quanta cura, 1864 papal encyclical
- Cura Mori District
- Cura nagara, a folk drum
