= Care =

Care may refer to:

== Organizations and projects ==
- CARE (New Zealand), Citizens' Association for Racial Equality, a former New Zealand organisation
- CARE International, Cooperative for Assistance and Relief Everywhere, an international aid and development organization
- Care.com, a company operating an online portal
- Carpet America Recovery Effort, an American carpet recycling project
- Charged Aerosol Release Experiment, a NASA project concerning dust in space
- Christian Action, Research and Education, a Christian lobby group in the United Kingdom
- Credit Abuse Resistance Education, an American national program
- Crew Module Atmospheric Re-entry Experiment, a 2014 ISRO experimental vehicle

== People with the surname ==
- Danny Care (soccer) (born 1974), American soccer player
- Danny Care (born 1987), English rugby union player
- Henry Care (1646–1688), English political writer and journalist
- Peter Care (born 1953), British film and video producer
- Terry John Care (born 1947), American politician

== Philosophy and science ==
- Care or Sorge, a term in Heideggerian terminology
- Cura (mythology) or Care, figure in ancient Roman Fabulae of Hyginus
- Duty of care, a legal obligation in tort law
- Ethics of care, a normative ethical theory
- Theology of relational care, a theology of understanding how contemporary followers of Jesus can relate to others
- Vulnerability and Care Theory of Love, the view that care is an integral part of romantic love

== Social concepts ==
- Child care, the act of caring for and supervising minor children
- Elderly care, the fulfillment of the special needs and requirements that are unique to senior citizens
- Foster care, a system by which a certified, stand-in "parent(s)" cares for minor children or young people
- Health care, the treatment and management of illness, and the preservation of health through services offered
  - Care of residents, care given to adults or children outside of the patient's home
  - Home care, health care or supportive care provided in the patient's home by healthcare professionals
  - Primary care, routine health care, usually the first provided a patient sees
  - Primary healthcare, a series of principles geared towards making health care available
- Intensive care medicine, provision of life support or organ support systems in patients who are critically ill
- Managed care, a variety of techniques intended to reduce the cost of providing health benefits and improve the quality of care
- Palliative care

== Music ==
- Care (band), a 1980s alternative rock band from Liverpool
- Care (How to Dress Well album), 2016
- Care (Shriekback album), 1983
- "Care", a song by Beabadoobee from Fake It Flowers, 2020
- "Care", a song by Bury Tomorrow from The Seventh Sun, 2023
- "Care", a song by Marillion from An Hour Before It's Dark, 2022

== Film and television ==
- Care (2000 film), a British television crime drama film
- "Care", a 2001 episode of Law & Order: Special Victims Unit
- "Care" (Law & Order: UK), the 2009 premiere episode of the British television series, Law & Order: UK
- Care (2018 film), a BBC drama co-written by Jimmy McGovern

== Other uses ==
- Career Average Revalued Earnings, another name for the career average pension model of occupational pension
- Continuous time Algebraic Riccati equation, a matrix equation
- Community Activities Restrictions Enforcement, a cordon sanitaire policy implemented in Indonesia to combat the COVID-19 pandemic

== See also ==
- Cair (disambiguation)
- Cares (disambiguation)
- Carle (disambiguation)
- Cari (disambiguation)
- Carre (disambiguation)
- Kare (disambiguation)
