= Cura (surname) =

Cura is a surname, and may refer to:

- Ben Cura (born 1988), British film, television and theatre actor
- Domingo Cura (born 2004), Argentinian musician
- Francesco Cura (born 1977), American actor, singer, and fashion model
- John Cura
- José Cura (born 1962), operatic tenor, conductor, director, scenographer and photographer
- Maria Renee Cura (died 2007), Argentinian geographer, writer, and Indologist
- Philippe Cura (born 1972), French actor
- Verónica Cura (born 1970), film producer, production manager, and production designer

== History ==
Cura is a noble ancient Roman family name.

== Etymology ==
Cura is the name of a divine figure whose name means "Care" or "Concern" in Latin. Hyginus seems to have created both the personification and story for his Fabulae, poem 220.

=== Origin ===
1. Latin: for "care", "cure", or "concern". 2. Spanish and Portuguese: from cura "priest". 3. Italian: probably a habitational name from Cura Carpignano in Pavia province, or other places named with this word.

== Given names ==
Spanish 38%; Portuguese 11%; Italian 9%. Jose (4), Pedro (3), Cayetano (2), Cristina (2), Miguel (2), Alfonso, Alicia, Bernardo, Enrique, Estela, Evangelina, Genaro; Joao; Aldo, Antonio, Elio, Federico, Gino, Silvio.(number of times this surname appears in a sample database of 88.7 million names, representing one third of the 1997 US population)

== See also ==
- Cura Ocllo (died 1539), Inca queen
- Cura (disambiguation)
- La Cura (disambiguation)
