= Natural History Museum, Vienna =

Museum in Vienna, Austria

Coordinates: 48.2052°N 16.3599°E

Natural History Museum
- Naturhistorisches Museum

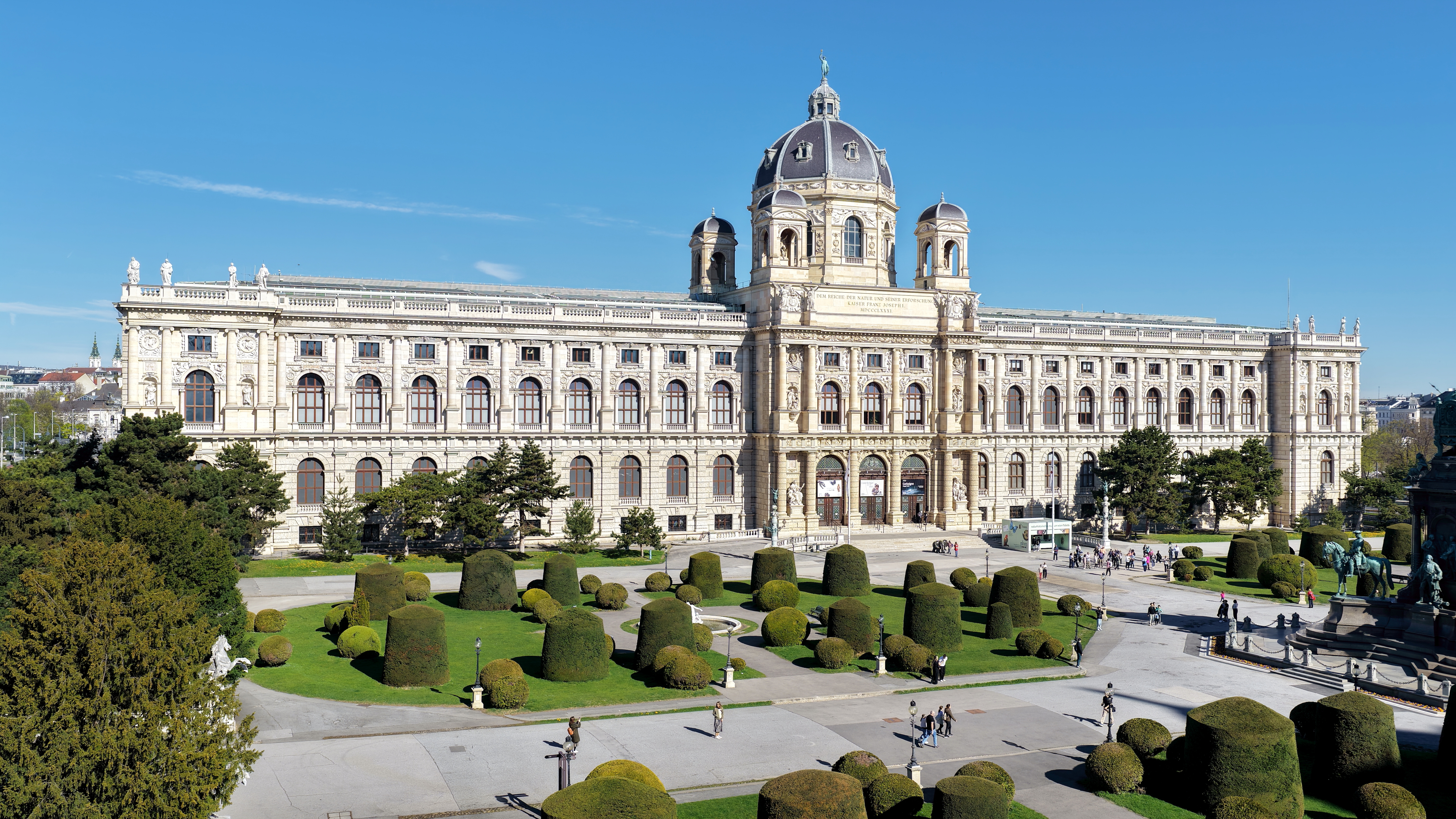
- Established: between 1872 and 1889
- Location: Vienna, Austria
- Director: Katrin Vohland
- Website: nhm-wien.ac.at/en

The Natural History Museum Vienna (German: Naturhistorisches Museum Wien) is a large natural history museum located in Vienna, Austria.

The NHM Vienna is one of the largest museums and non-university research institutions in Austria and an important center of excellence for all matters relating to natural sciences. The museum's 39 exhibition rooms cover 8,460 square meters and present more than 100,000 objects. It is home to 30 million objects available to more than 60 scientists and numerous guest researchers who carry out basic research in a wide range of topics related to human sciences, earth sciences, and life sciences.

The Index Herbariorum code assigned to this museum is "W" and it is used when citing housed herbarium specimens.

== History ==
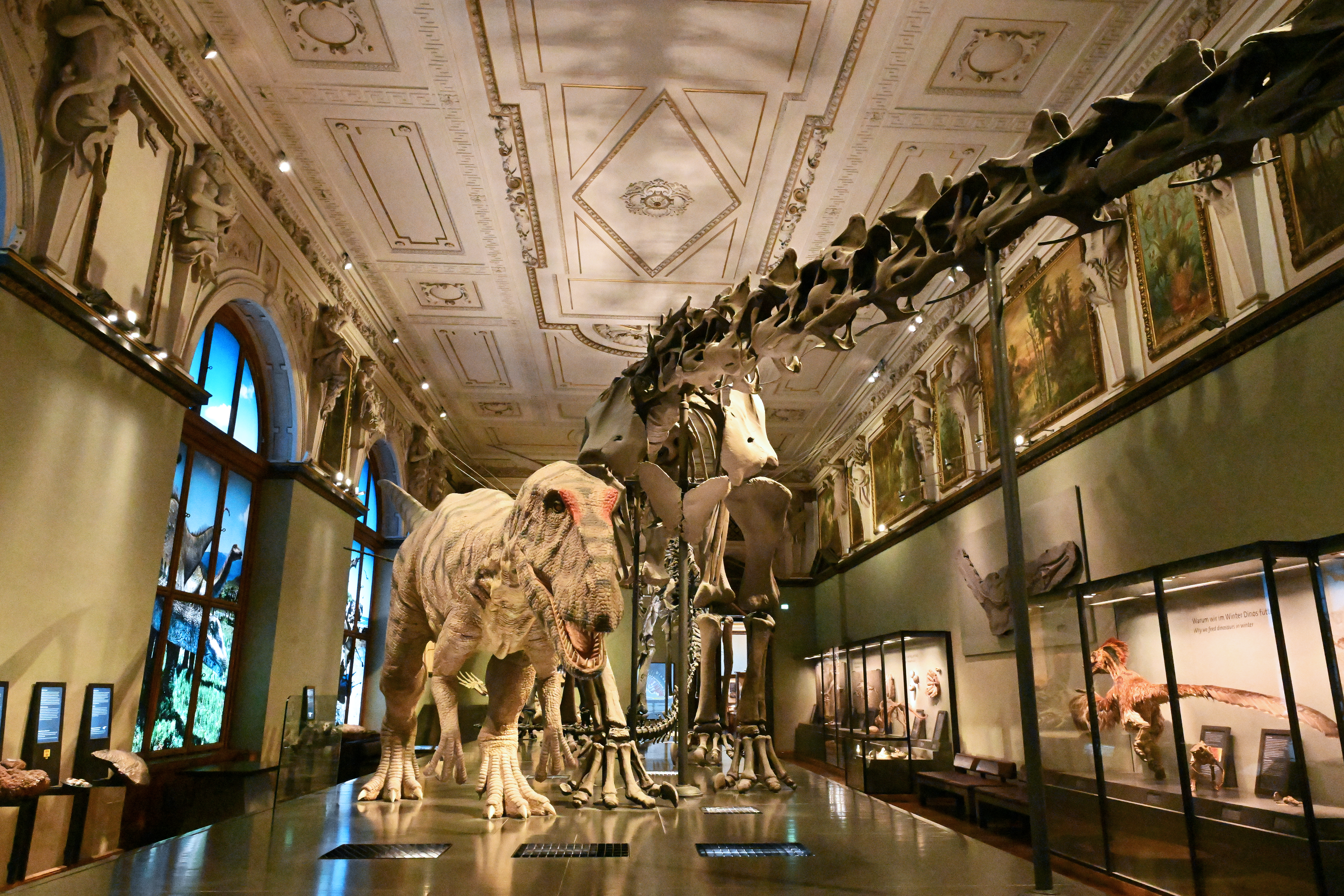
Dinosaur hall, hall 10 at NHM Vienna

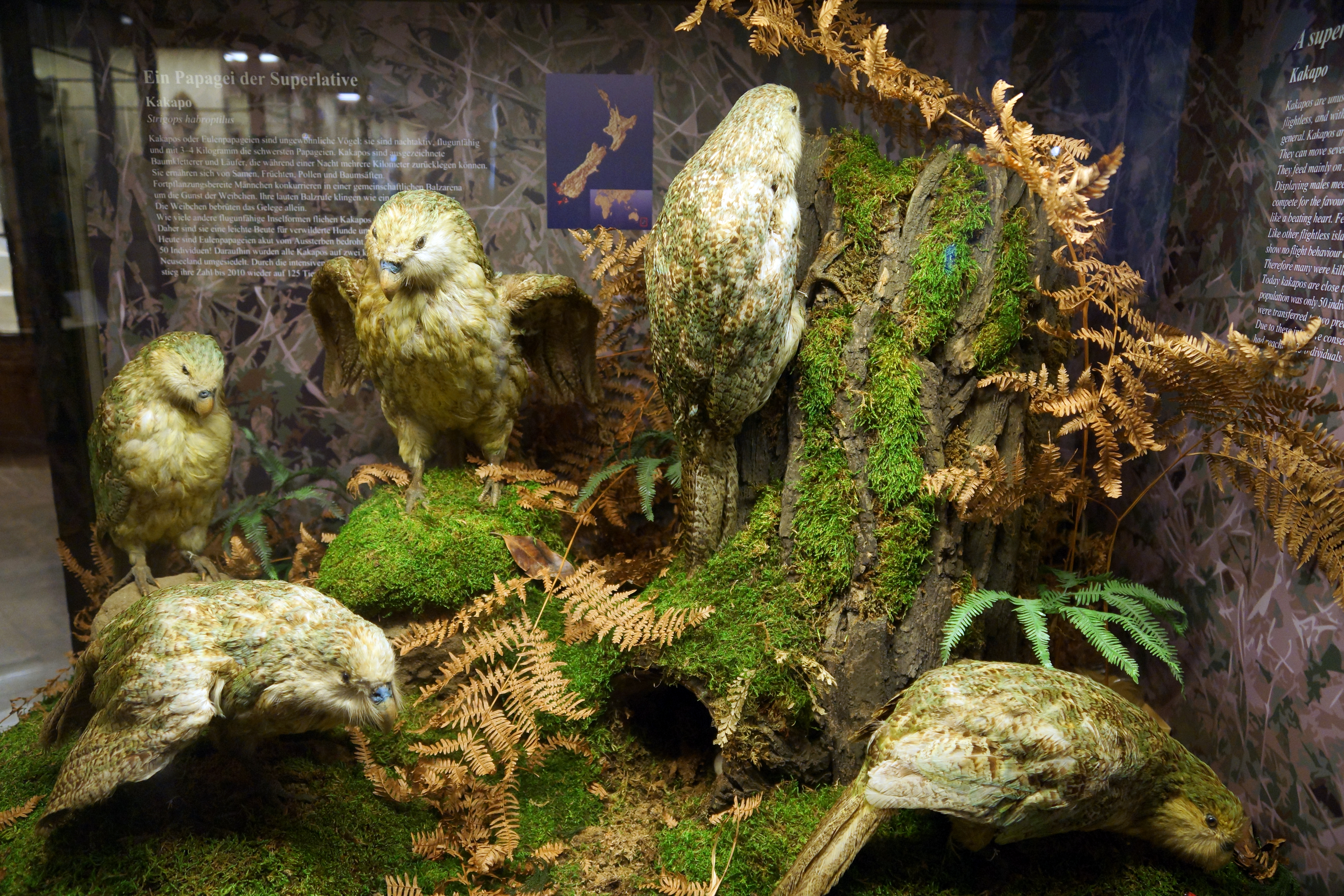
Kakapo specimens at the museum

The earliest collections of the Natural History Museum Vienna date back more than 250 years. It was the Holy Roman Emperor Francis I, Maria Theresa’s husband, who in 1750 purchased what was at the time the world's largest collection of natural history objects from the Florentine scholar and scientist Jean de Baillou. This was the first step on the road to creating the Natural History Museum Vienna.

Baillou's collection comprised 30,000 objects, including rare fossils, snails, mussels, and corals, as well as valuable minerals and precious stones.

Emperor Francis, who founded the Schönbrunn zoo in 1752 and the botanical garden in 1753, also organized the first scientific overseas expedition. In 1755 he commissioned Nicolaus Joseph Jacquin to travel to the Caribbean, the Antilles, Venezuela, and Colombia. Jacquin returned from this expedition with many live animals and plants for the zoo and the botanical garden, as well as 67 cases full of other items of interest from the natural world.

After the Emperor's death, Maria Theresa gave the natural science collection to the state and opened it up to the general public. Thus she created the first museum in line with the principles and visions of the Enlightenment.

It was Maria Theresa who brought the mineralogist Ignaz von Born to Vienna. Born, who had developed a new method of extracting precious metals, was tasked with classifying and expanding the collections. To this end he had minerals from many different regions sent to Vienna, where they were added to the collection. Under the leadership of Ignaz von Born the cabinet of natural history quickly developed into a center of practical research.

=== Expeditions ===
==== Expedition to the Brazilian rainforests ====
To mark the marriage of his daughter Leopoldine to the heir to the Portuguese throne, Dom Pedro, Emperor Francis II sponsored a scientific expedition to her new home country of Brazil in 1817. Two Austrian frigates accompanied the archduchess on her journey to Rio de Janeiro.

Those taking part in the expedition, carried out under the scientific direction of the head of the history collection, included the researchers Johann Mikan and Johann Emmanuel, as well as the taxidermist Johann Natterer and the landscape painter Thomas Ender. The expedition lasted 18 years and aimed to collect all plants, animals, and minerals of scientific interest and bring them back to Vienna.

==== The Novara sails the globe ====
The most ambitious Austrian expedition was carried out by the SMS Novara, a frigate which sailed the world between 1857 and 1859. The scientific responsibility for this expedition was shared by the Academy of Sciences and the Geography Society. The man behind the project was Archduke Ferdinand Maximilian, Commander in Chief of the Austrian Navy.

Among the advisors was the naturalist and researcher Alexander von Humboldt. Many scientists took part in the two-year journey, including the geologist Ferdinand von Hochstetter, ethnologist Karl von Scherzer and zoologist Georg Ritter von Frauenfeld. The entire journey was documented in hundreds of sketches and paintings by the landscape artist Josef Selleny. The scientists returned home with a vast haul of minerals, animals, plants and items of ethnological interest.

==== The Admiral Tegetthoff travels into the ice ====
The last significant research expedition of the 19th century was the Austro-Hungarian North Pole expedition (1872–1874) led by Julius von Payer and Carl Weyprecht. On August 30, 1873, the participants on board discovered Franz Joseph Land.

With the main ship, the 220-ton Admiral Tegetthoff, at risk of breaking up under the pressure of the ice, the members of the expedition were forced to leave the ship. On May 20, 1874, they began their long retreat to the south, transporting their equipment and provisions on sleds and boats. Despite many sacrifices and great danger, the scientists returned to Vienna with both their invaluable travel journals and observations of the landscape, as well as a number of natural history items of interest welded into metal cases.

=== Imperial Natural History Museum ===
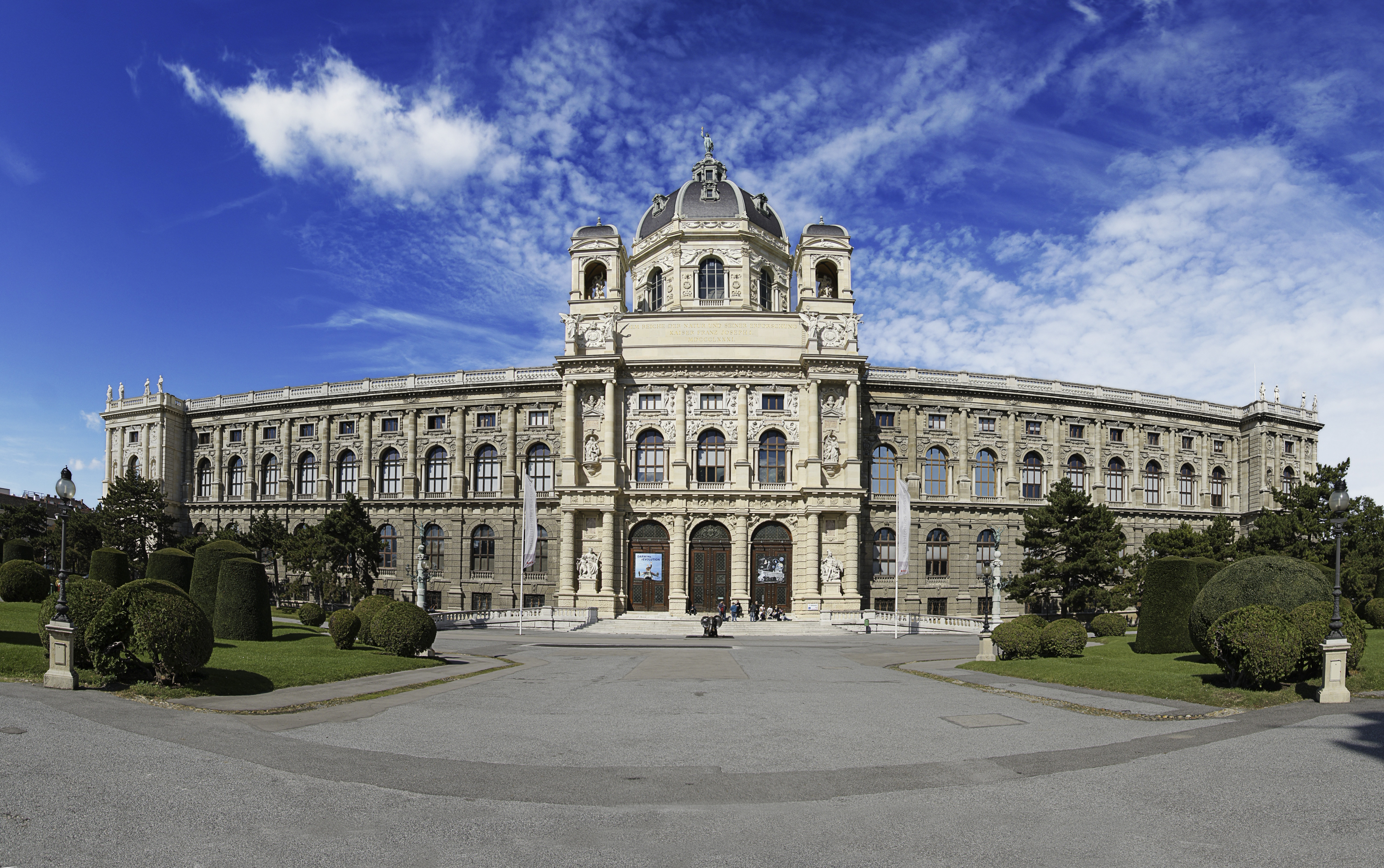
Naturhistorisches Museum at Maria-Theresien-Platz, Vienna

The Imperial Natural History Museum or Imperial-Royal Natural History Court Museum of Austria-Hungary was created by (Kaiser) Emperor Franz Joseph I during an extensive reorganization of the museum collections, from 1851 to 1876, and opened to the public on August 10, 1889. Located in Vienna, the Museum was named in German as "K.k. Naturhistorisches Hofmuseum" (with "Hofmuseum" translated as "Court Museum").

In the mid-19th century, there was much interest in the natural sciences, and the encouragement of this interest was a concern of the young sovereign, Franz Josef I: The newly built museum was inscribed: "Dem Reiche der Natur und seiner Erforschung —Kaiser FRANZ JOSEF I" ("To the realm of nature and its exploration —Emperor FRANZ JOSEPH I"). The new Imperial-Royal Natural History Court Museum thus documented the benevolent sentiment of the Imperial Household. Excavations for the construction of the new Museum of Nature started in the fall of 1871, and construction was completed more than ten years later.

On April 29, 1876, Emperor Franz Joseph I signed the document certifying the Natural History Court Museum, and Ferdinand von Hochstetter was appointed as the managing director of the museum. Hochstetter proposed a new organization for the museum and its collections. Four departments having far-reaching autonomy were created as successors to the older Cabinets; the Imperial-Royal Mineralogical Court Cabinet was divided in an Imperial-Royal Mineralogical-Petrographical Department and an Imperial-Royal Geologic-Paleontologic Department. The petrologist and meteorite specialist Aristides Brezina became director of the former and was supported by scientific colleagues: Friedrich Berwerth, with Felix Karrer and Rudolf Koechlin providing voluntary unpaid services. Felix Karrer became Secretary of the Wissenschaftlicher Club (Science Club) and founder of the Mineralogy collection of the department. By 1886, Rudolf Köchlin became scientific assistant and, later, maintained an inventory of the collection and even kept a diary.

Hochstetter died on July 18, 1884, and did not live to see the completion of the building for whose founding he had been so actively engaged. His successor as superintendent was Franz Ritter von Hauer, a geologist and paleontologist.

In the presence of the Emperor, the new "K.k. Naturhistorisches Hofmuseum" (Imperial-Royal Natural History Court Museum) was inaugurated on August 10, 1889. Initially, it was open to visitors four days per week—free on Thursdays, Saturdays and Sundays, on Tuesdays for an admission price of one florin. The museum building and the collection it contained were popular: from August 13, 1889, to the end of December 1889 the museum counted 175,000 visitors, of which most (134,000) visited the museum during the 19 Sundays over this time span alone.

During 1889, the "Mineralogisch-Petrographische Abteilung" (Department of Mineralogy-Petrography) was under the directorship of Aristides Brezina.

In 1889, the museum purchased the collection of William Earl Hidden from Newark, New Jersey (USA) for a sum of ƒ15,000 with the aid of an advance from the "All-highest Family Fund" of the Imperial Household. This loan had to be repaid in a series of complicated transactions, effected within a timeframe of ten years (i.e. through the sale of mineral doublets, meteorite sections, and precious-metal redemptions). These redemptions also included samples of silver and gold from the former "Ambrasian Collection" of Archduke Ferdinand II, a loss and impairment to the collection.

In the same year of 1889, several items from the former private collection of Crown Prince Rudolf, whose death was reported as suicide, were passed on to the department, although apparently this had been against his will: the Crown Prince had left his natural history collection to Viennese teaching institutions. In accordance with these terms, the geologic and paleontological collection and his mineral collection were to be passed to the "K.k. Hochschule für Bodenkultur" (Imperial-Royal University for Agriculture). Instead, the glass imitations of precious stones and some other mineralogical items were entrusted to the Imperial Natural History Court Museum.

Koechlin became an assistant in 1892 and was promoted to assistant custodian in 1896. In the same year, Friedrich Berwerth was put in charge of the department, taking over from Aristides Brezina, who retired on August 30. Voluntary, unpaid assistance, from 1896 to the end of the monarchy was provided by Felix Karrer, alternately by Anton Pelinka, Hermann Graber, Friedrich Wachter and Karl Hlawatsch. In one last transaction before the collapse of the monarchy, the museum managed to purchase, during the years 1906–1907, the magnificent collection of Staatsrath Freiherr von Braun (totalling more than 2,500 items, doublets not included). There followed the far less important collections of August von Loehr and Rudolf von Görgey, although those were not entirely taken into inventory until after the Second World War, the delay being due to war and subsequent poor economic conditions (the same had happened to the collection of Friedrich Freiherr von Distler, acquired in 1932).

Kommerzialrat Isidor Weinberger was a patron at the start of the 20th century. He was one of the sponsors of mineralogy, and donated the large specimen of amethyst sample from the Serra do Mar in Brazil, weighing about 450 kilograms (990 lb). Particularly valuable are the more than 500 meteorite thin sections, formerly owned by Aristides Brezina, custodian and former director, which Weinberger had purchased and later presented to the Museum.

== Directors ==
From 1876, Superintendents:

- 1876–1884 Ferdinand von Hochstetter(1829–1884): the first superintendent of what was then the Imperial Natural History Museum, after having been, from 1860, professor of mineralogy and geology at the Imperial-Royal Polytechnic Institute in Vienna.
- 1885–1896 Franz von Hauer: a geologist and paleontologist
- 1896–1897 no superintendent, but temporary director: Franz Steindachner
- 1898–1919 Franz Steindachner

From 1919, Chairmen of the Museum Council:

- 1919–1922 Ludwig Lorenz von Liburnau
- 1923–1924 Franz Xaver Schaffer

From 1924, First Directors:

- 1925–1932 Hans Rebel
- 1933–1938 Hermann Michel
- 1938–1939 Otto Pesta, Acting Director
- 1939–1945 Hans Kummerlöwe, "First Director of the Scientific Museums in Vienna"
- 1945–1951 Hermann Michel
- 1951–1962 Hans Strouhal
- 1963–1971 Karl Heinz Rechinger
- 1972–1978 Friedrich Bachmayer
- 1979–1987 Oliver Paget
- 1987–1994 Heinz A. Kollmann

From 1994: Directors General

- 1994–2009 Bernd Lötsch
- January 1, 2010 – May 31, 2010 Herbert Kritscher, Acting Director
- 2010–2020 Christian Köberl, Director General and chief executive officer

From June 2020:

- Katrin Vohland, Director General and chief executive officer

== The building ==
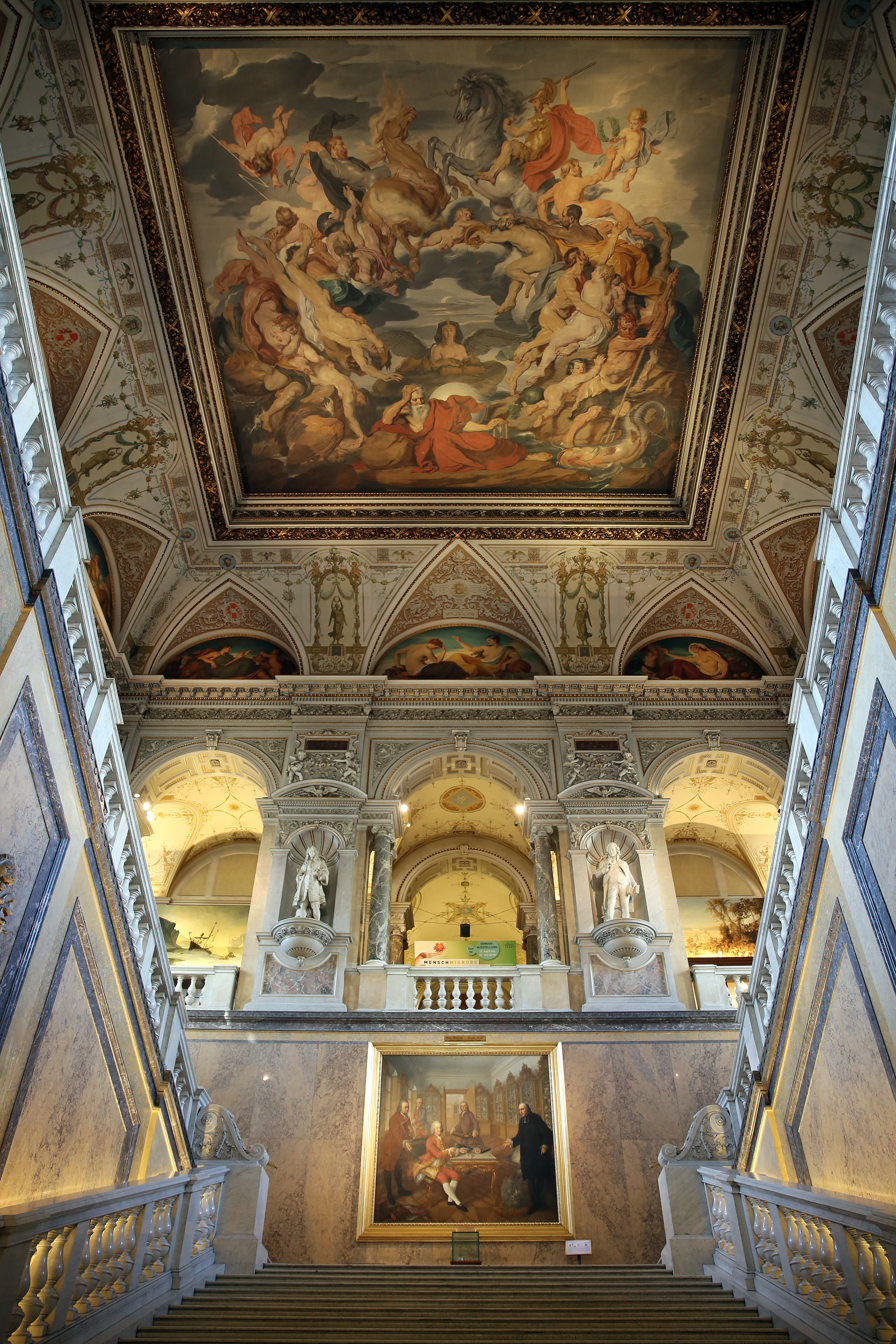
Main staircase in the museum building

The Natural History Museum and the Museum of Fine Arts were commissioned by Emperor Franz Joseph I (1830–1916) and designed by the architects Gottfried Semper (1803–1879) and Carl Hasenauer (1833–1894). The two museums have identical exteriors and face each other. They were originally designed to be part of a much larger project – an Imperial Forum – which was never realized in full. Work on the Natural History Museum lasted from 1871 until 1881. On August 10, 1889, Emperor Franz Joseph himself officially opened the museum. Its façade, designed by Gottfried Semper, shows figures and statues representing progress in the field of natural sciences and the power of nature. Below the dome, the imperial dedication in golden letters reads: "To the realm of nature and its exploration".

=== Architecture ===
The historicism style of art and architecture was very popular in 19th century Austria.

The Natural History Museum Vienna incorporates stylistic elements from many past periods, in particular the Renaissance. Work began on the building in 1871 and the facade was finished in 1881. It is around 170 meters long and 70 meters wide, comprising two courtyards that are each surrounded by working and exhibition rooms. The roof is crowned with a 65 m dome bearing a huge bronze statue of the Greek sun god Helios, a symbol of the life-giving element without which nature would not exist. The upper and middle levels (mezzanine and first floor) of the intricately decorated facade display allegorical and mythological figures representing key elements of the universe and its discovery and understanding by man. On the balustrade visitors can see sculptures of researchers and scientists who represent the continuing progress of human knowledge. These fundamental ideas are also the basis for the sculptures and paintings in the Dome Hall and the grand staircase; the highlight here is Hans Canon's ceiling fresco, The Circle of Life.

The internal structure of the building is dictated by the systematic organization of the exhibition and the individual departments. The mezzanine covers inanimate nature (Department of Mineralogy, Halls 1–5), sediments and traces of life early in Earth's history (Department of Geology & Paleontology, Halls 6–10), early human history (Department of Prehistory, Halls 11–13) and human development (Department of Anthropology, Halls 14–15). The first floor presents the huge diversity of the animal world (Zoological Departments, Halls 22–39) as well as the fascinating realm of the Earth's smallest organisms ("Microtheater", Hall 21). The exhibits themselves are displayed in a systematic order according to how closely they are related to each other or their chronological position in the history of Planet Earth or human beings.

=== Ceiling painting ===
The 100 square-metre ceiling painting above the grand staircase depicts the "Circle of Life". Hans Canon (1829–1885) had the freedom to choose his subject and painted a dramatic allegory of the rise and decline of humanity. In addition, humankind serving as the central theme of this painting further fulfills Hochstetter’s concept.

The cycle of growing and passing away in human existence is presented in a circular composition. It reflects the idea of the fight for existence, which dominated scientific thought at that time. At the same time the animal world was brought into this cycle as well: on one side "mankind made the Earth its servant" (it catches a catfish with its trident); on the other side, however, nature wins the upper hand (a vulture guards its prey). Nevertheless, mankind stands in the center of these events: a man, wrapped in a red cloth, holds an hourglass (presumably an allusion to Chronos, the god of time).

== Exhibition area ==
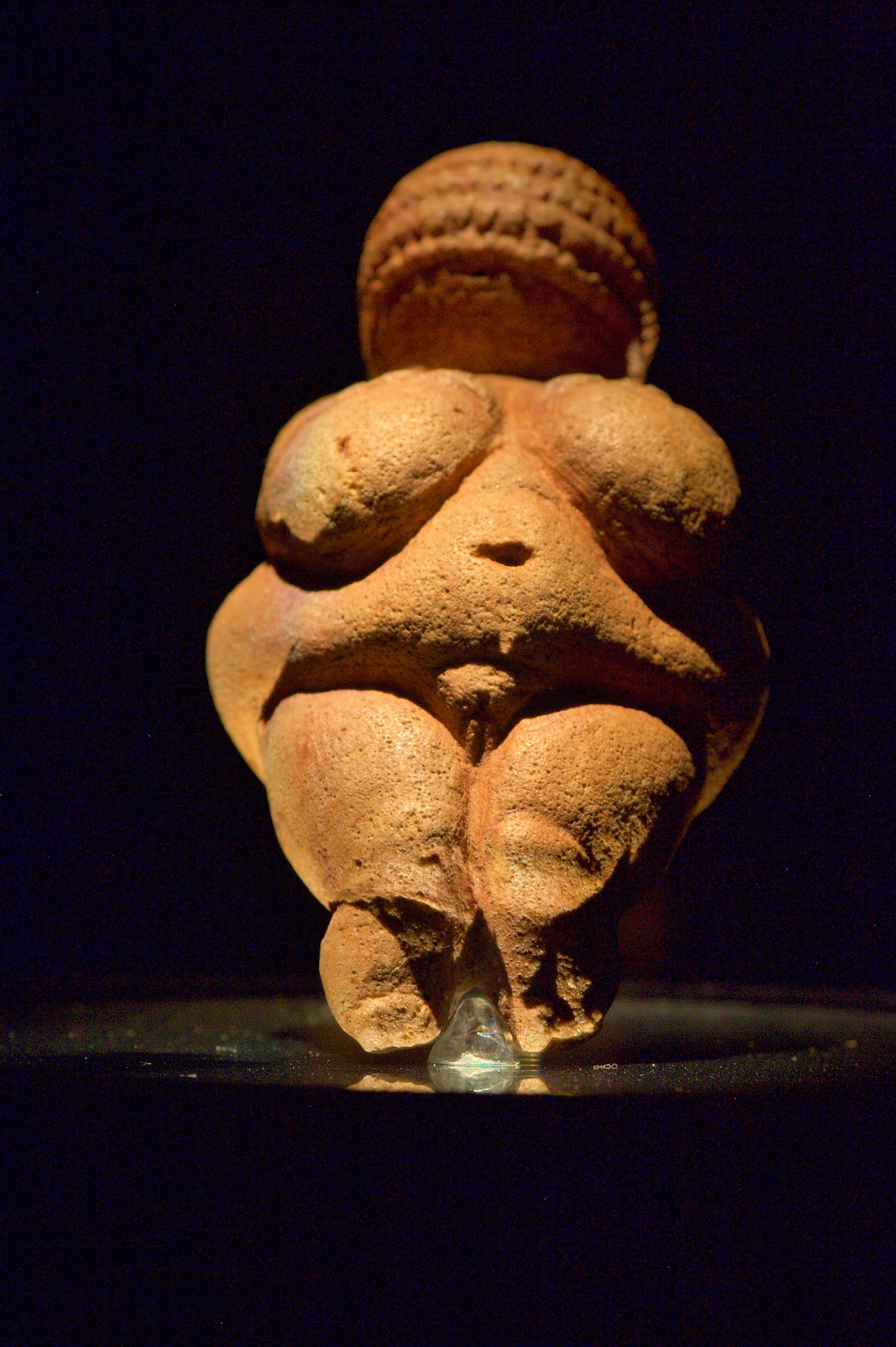
The Venus of Willendorf.

In 39 display halls with an area of 8,700 m^{2} the collections give an overview of the diversity of life on Earth. The order of the halls is based on the classification values of the 19th century: humans as the "apex of creation" were originally presented in a large part of the mezzanine with anthropology, ethnology, and prehistory.

On the first floor the visitor was to be guided from the "most simple" through to the "most consummate evolutionary animals". For this reason, the apes, as representatives of the primates, are found at the end of the tour.

This systematic concept of the collections has been preserved to the present even though today evolution is no longer seen as development toward perfection, but as development toward diversity.

The furnishings of the display halls, with display cases of dark, carved wood, are mostly originals from the opening days of the museum, from the plans of Ferdinand von Hochstetter.

This historical presentation of the collections is almost unique in the world today.

=== The mezzanine level ===
The mezzanine is decorated with more than 100 oil paintings, illustrations which complement the objects displayed in the halls. Some halls are additionally decorated with figures.

This interplay between decoration and display objects is noted as a unique and artistic decision in presentation.

The exhibitions on mezzanine level:

Halls 1–4: Mineralogy & Petrography

Hall 5: Meteorites

Halls 6–10: Paleontology

Halls 11–13: Prehistory Halls 14–15: Anthropology

==== Halls I–IV: Mineralogy & Petrography ====
The large public displays in halls I–V show aesthetic and scientifically valuable minerals, ores, gemstones, rocks (including decorative and building stones) as well as meteorites and impactites (including tektites) collected over more than 500 years. All objects are arranged in a systematic way and new objects are added each year. Special temporary exhibitions may be presented as well in individual halls.

The first four halls show the systematic mineral exhibit. Hall I contains large mineral samples (in a glass cabinet in the middle of the room), a collection of building materials (samples) and the first part of the systematic mineral exhibit. Hall II continues with sulphides, halogenides, oxides, hydroxides, nitrates, iodates and carbonates), in Hall III there are carbonates, borates, sulfates, chromates, phosphates, arsenates and vanadates.

Phosphates, arsenates and silicates, gemstones and the rock collection are exhibited in Hall IV. The collection of gems and precious stones can also be found in this hall. This collection is one of the most comprehensive and valuable of its kind to be found on the European continent. One cabinet contains significant specimens of jewelry material, whereby the raw material and the half-finished stones are placed alongside the finished cut and polished stones together with pieces of original jewelry. Two side cabinets contain larger samples of the precious stones collection. The original rhinestone copy of the Florentine Diamond is kept in Hall IV.

== Repatriation of ancestral remains ==
In 2022 the Museum returned the remains of about 64 Māori and Moriori people, collected by Andreas Reischek, to Museum of New Zealand Te Papa Tongarewa in Wellington, New Zealand.

== Gallery ==
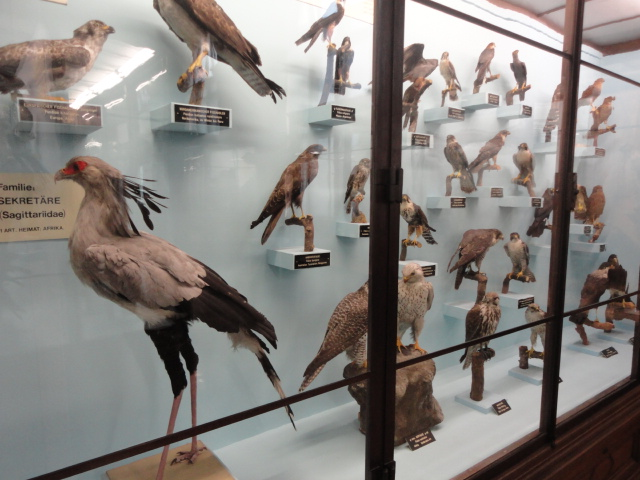
Ornithological display
(1 of 2)

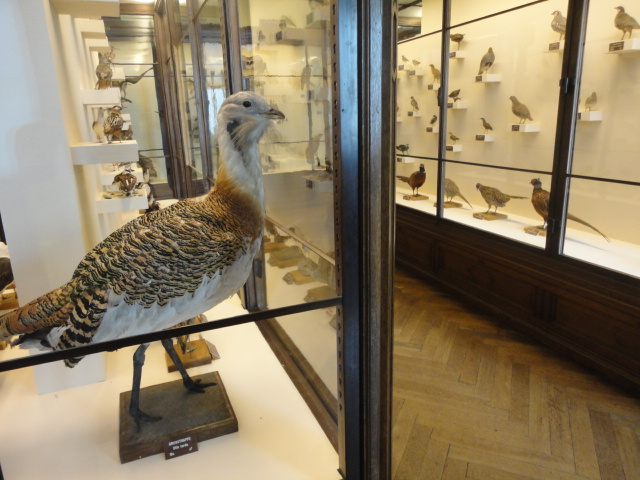
Ornithological display
(2 of 2)

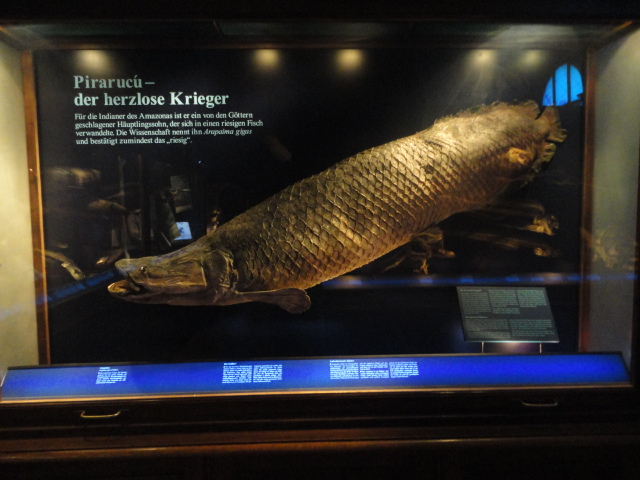
A pirarucu (Arapaima) from the Amazon River, Brazil

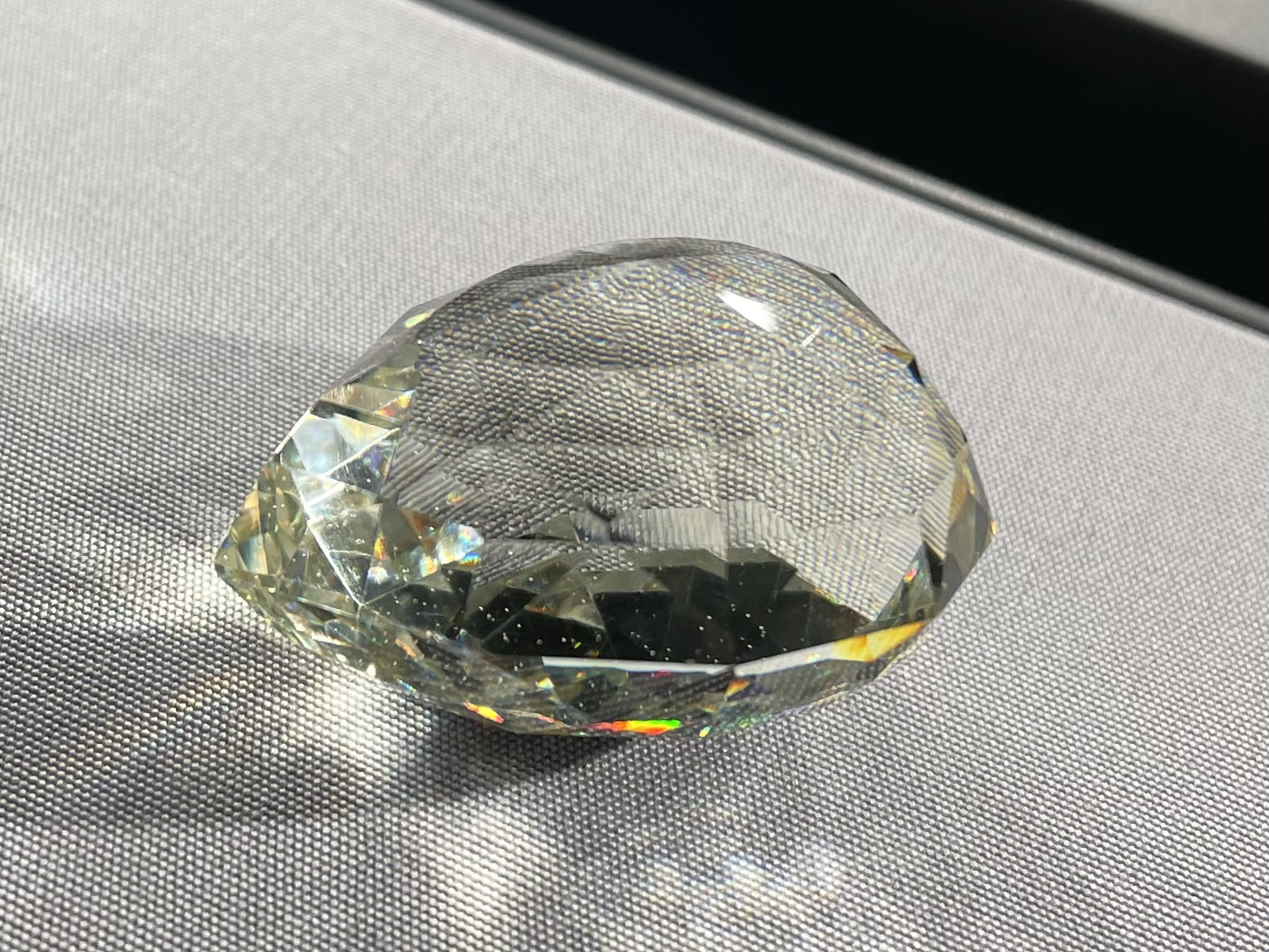
Historic rhinestone copy of the Florentine Diamond made in 1865

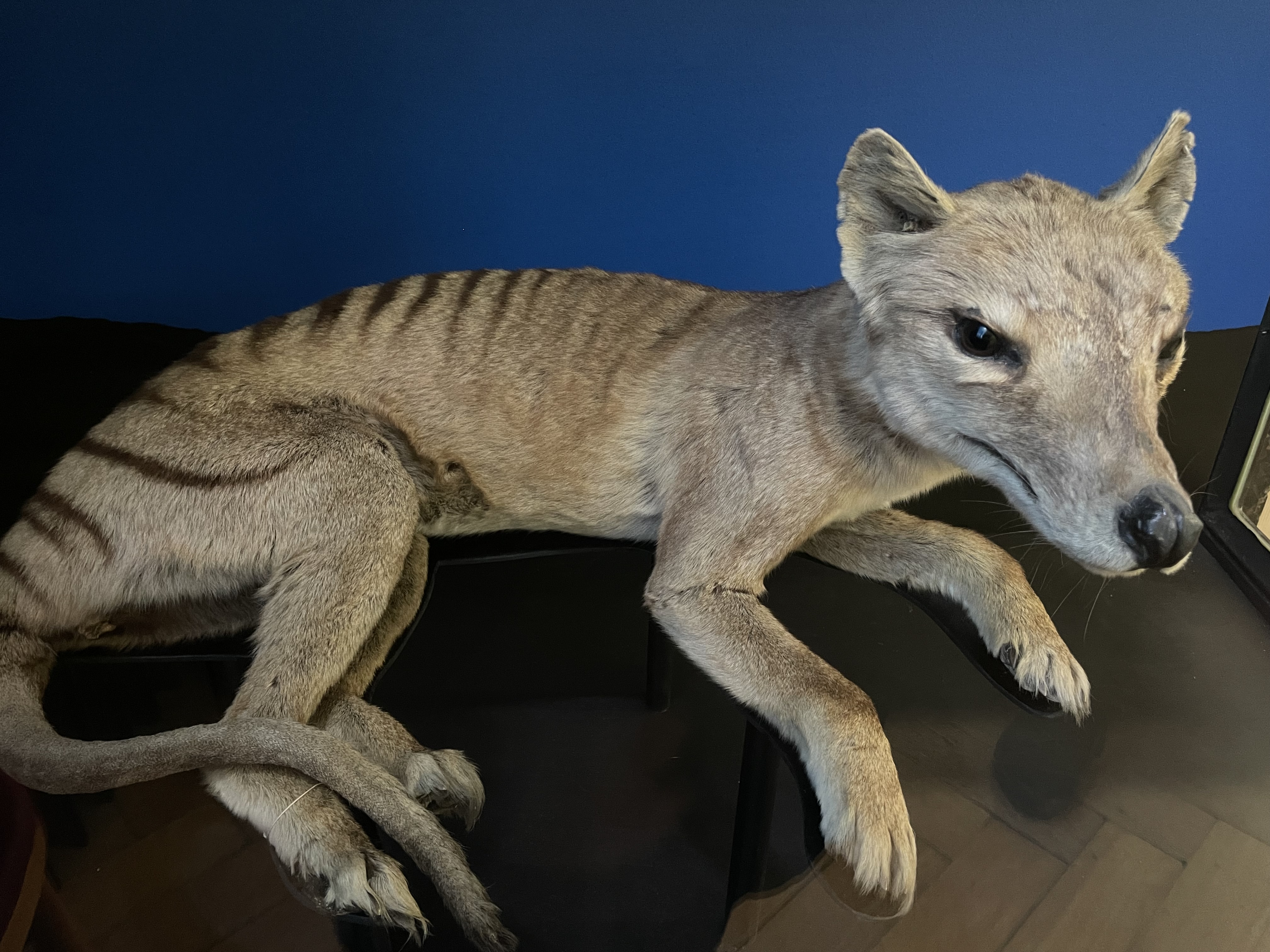
Thylacine

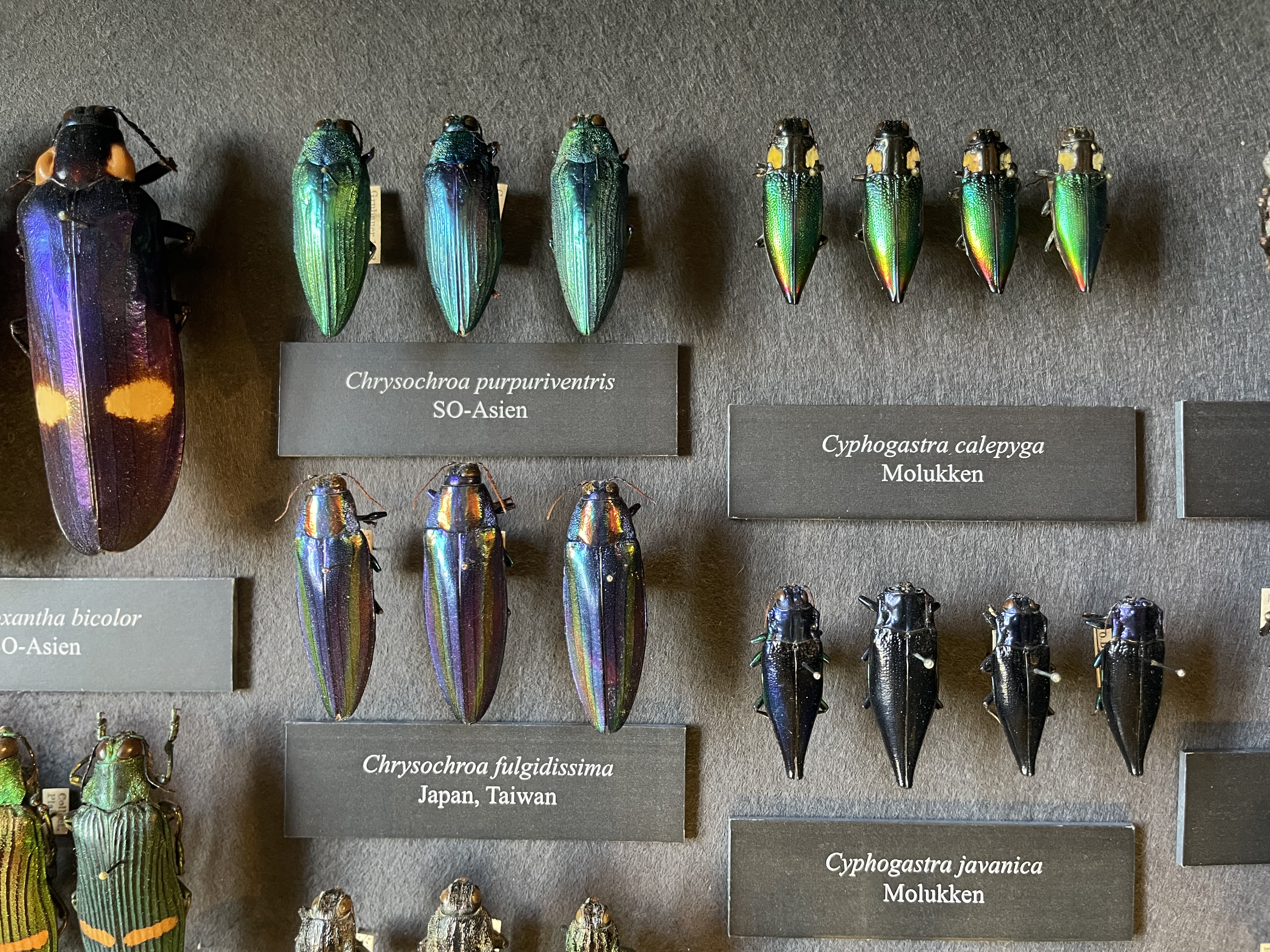
Insect collection

== See also ==
- Imperial Natural History Museum, the current museum's predecessor.

Other major museums in Vienna

- Kunsthistorisches Museum, the Museum of Fine Art sitting opposite the Vienna Museum of Natural History.
  - Lobkowitz Palace, housing the Kunsthistorisches Museum's theatrical department and the Austrian National Library.
- Technisches Museum Wien, the Museum of Technology.
- Museum of Ethnology
