= Karreh =

Karreh (Persian: كره) may refer to various places in Iran:

- Karreh, Charam, Kohgiluyeh and Boyer-Ahmad Province
- Karreh, Dana, Kohgiluyeh and Boyer-Ahmad Province
- Karreh-ye Olya, Kohgiluyeh and Boyer-Ahmad Province
- Karreh-ye Sofla, Kohgiluyeh and Boyer-Ahmad Province
- Karreh Dan Zizi, Kohgiluyeh and Boyer-Ahmad Province
- Karreh Shahbazi, Kohgiluyeh and Boyer-Ahmad Province
- Karreh Shekaf, Lorestan Province

== See also ==
- Karre
- Koreh (disambiguation)
