= Kureh =

Kureh or Kowreh (Persian: كوره) may refer to:

- Kureh, Fars
- Kureh, Gilan
- Kureh, Kermanshah
- Kureh, Markazi
- Kureh-ye Olya, West Azerbaijan province
- Kureh-ye Sofla, West Azerbaijan province

== See also ==
- Kureh is a common element in Iranian place names; see
- Koreh (disambiguation)
