= Karrer =

Karrer is a surname. Notable people with the name include:

- Annie May Hurd Karrer (1893–?), American plant physiologist
- Chris Karrer (1947–2024), German guitarist and composer
- Felix Karrer (1825–1903), Austrian geologist
- Hanna Karrer (born 2008), Austrian snowboarder
- Josef Karrer (born 1939), German handball player
- Karl Karrer (1815–1886), Swiss politician
- Loukas Karrer (1909-1985), Greek politician
- Paul Karrer (1889–1971), Swiss organic chemist

== See also ==
- Karre
- Karrer (crater), lunar impact crater
