= Khyri =

Khyri is a masculine given name. Notable people with the name include:

- Khyri Thomas (born 1996), American basketball player
- Khyri Thornton (born 1989), American football player

== See also ==
- Kyrie (given name)
