= Karve =

Karve may refer to:

- Karve (surname), an Indian surname
  - Dhondo Keshav Karve, a 20th-century Indian social reformer
    - Maharshi Karve Stree Shikshan Samstha, an Indian education society
    - Karve Road, Pune, India
- Karve (ship), a type of small Viking ship
- Majare Karve, a village in Maharashtra, India
