= Kare (surname) =

Kare is a surname. Notable people with the surname include:

- Jordin Kare (1956–2017), American aerospace engineer
- Morley Kare (1922–1990), Canadian scientist
- Ramnath Kare (born 1934), Indian businessman
- Susan Kare (born 1954), American graphic designer

== See also ==
- Kare (disambiguation)
- Karey (disambiguation)
- Karie (name)
- Karre
