= Koreh =

Koreh or Koroh or Kareh (Persian: كره) may refer to:

- Kareh, Isfahan
- Kareh, Khuzestan
- Koreh, Markazi
- Koreh, South Khorasan
- Korehi, in Fars Province

== See also ==
- Karey (disambiguation)
- Karreh (disambiguation)
- Kureh (disambiguation)
