= Cure (disambiguation) =

A cure is a completely effective treatment for a disease.

Cure or The Cure, or variants, may also refer to:

== Arts, entertainment and media ==
=== Film ===
- The Cure (1917 film), a short film starring Charlie Chaplin
- The Cure (1995 film), a drama starring Brad Renfro and Joseph Mazzello
- Cure (film), a 1997 film directed by Kiyoshi Kurosawa
- The Cure (2014 film), a thriller starring Antonia Prebble and Daniel Lissing
- The Cured, a 2017 Irish horror film
- The Cure, a 2019 British television docudrama about Julie Bailey starring Siân Brooke
- Cured (film), a 2020 American documentary film
- The Cure (2026 film), an American sci-fi horror

=== Literature ===
- The Cure, a 1946 novella by Lewis Padgett
- Cures: A Gay Man's Odyssey, a 1991 memoir by Martin Duberman
- The Cure, a 1994 novel by Carlo Gébler
- The Cure, a 1999 novel by Sonia Levitin
- The Cure, a 2003 novel by Jack D. Hunter
- Cure, a 2010 novel by Robin Cook
- The Cure, a 2013 novel by Douglas E. Richards
- The Cure, a 2015 novel by JG Faherty
- The Cure, a 2018 novella by Robert Reed
- The Cure, a 2020 novel by Glenn Cooper
- Cure (magazine), a Japanese music and style magazine

=== Music ===
- The Cure, an English rock band

==== Albums ====
- Cure (album), by Erra, 2024
- The Cure (The Cure album), 2004
- The Cure (Keith Jarrett album), a live album by American pianist Keith Jarrett's "Standards Trio", 1990
- The Cure (The Saw Doctors album), 2005
- The Cure, by Guy Manning, 2000, remastered in 2010
- The Cure, by Jah Cure, 2015
- The Cure, by Rza from the Wu-Tang Clan, 2011
- Cured (album), a 1981 album by Steve Hackett

==== Songs ====
- "Cure", by Metallica from Load, 1996
- "The Cure" (Lady Gaga song), 2017
- "The Cure" (Olivia Rodrigo song), 2026
- "The Cure", by Jordin Sparks from Battlefield, 2009
- "The Cure", by Little Mix from LM5, 2018
- "The Cure", by SM Town from 2022 Winter SM Town: SMCU Palace, 2022
- "A Cure", by Blonde Redhead from Melody of Certain Damaged Lemons, 2000

=== Television ===
- The Cure (TV series), a 2018 Philippine TV series

==== Episodes ====
- "Cure", Criminal Minds season 13, episode 13 (2018)
- "Cure", Garo: The Animation – The Carved Seal of Flames episode 16 (2015)
- "Cure", Smallville season 7, episode 4 (2007)
- "Cure", Stargate SG-1 season 6, episode 10 (2002)
- "Cure", The Gentle Touch series 5, episode 11 (1984)
- "Cure", Ultraman Nexus episode 22 (2005)
- "The Cure", Alfred Hitchcock Presents season 5, episode 17 (1960)
- "The Cure", Air America episode 25 (1999)
- "The Cure", Class of 3000 season 2, episode 7 (2007)
- "The Cure Part 1" and "The Cure Part 2", Dinotopia episodes 11–12 (2003)
- "The Cure", Dragon Hunters season 2, episode 6 (2007)
- "The Cure", Fantastic Four: World's Greatest Heroes episode 18 (2007)
- "The Cure", Fringe season 1, episode 6 (2008)
- "The Cure", Grandfathered episode 22 (2016)
- "The Cure", Have Gun – Will Travel season 4, episode 35 (1961)
- "The Cure", King Arthur and the Knights of Justice season 2, episode 11
- "The Cure", North of 60 season 3, episode 5 (1994)
- "The Cure", Piggy Tales season 1, episode 22 (2014)
- "The Cure", Planet of the Apes episode 12 (1974)
- "The Cure", Popeye the Sailor episode 46 in the Paramount Cartoon Studios production line (1961)
- "The Cure", Scavengers Reign episode 7 (2023)
- "The Cure", Seven Days season 2, episode 23 (2000)
- "The Cure", The Fearing Mind episode 4 (2000)
- "The Cure", The Mighty Hercules season 1, episode 19 (1963)
- "The Cure", The Secret Service episode 10 (1969)
- "The Cure", The Shield season 4, episode 1 (2005)
- "The Cure", Time Trax season 2, episode 8 (1994)
- "The Cure", Toad Patrol season 1, episode 11 (2000)
- "The Cure", Wanted Dead or Alive season 3, episode 2 (1960)
- "The Cure", Wolfblood series 3, episode 9 (2014)
- "The Cure", X-Men: The Animated Series season 1, episode 9 (1993)
- "Cured", Red Dwarf XII, episode 1 (2017)

== Businesses and organizations ==
- Citizens United for Rehabilitation of Errants, a United States prisoner support and prison reform organization
- Citizens United for Research in Epilepsy, a non-profit organization based in Chicago, Illinois
- Coalition to Uproot Ragging from Education, non-profit NGO in India, dedicated to the elimination of ragging in India
- Coalition on Urban Renewal and Education
- CURE Children's Hospital of Uganda, a pediatric neurosurgery hospital in Uganda
- CURE International, a medical charity organization
- Project C.U.R.E., an American disaster relief organization

== Places ==
- Cure (river), in France
- Rivière du Curé, in Quebec, Canada
- Cures, Sabinum, an ancient Italian town
- Cures, Sarthe, a commune in western France
- CURE, refers to Core Urban Region Economy, a strategic zone created by Government of Telangana in 2026, encompassing the Greater Hyderabad Municipal Corporation (GHMC), Cyberabad, and Malkajgiri.

== Science and technology ==
- Curing (chemistry), the process of hardening a polymer material
- Curing (food preservation), a food preservation technique
- Curing (vegetable preservation)
- Curing of concrete, the process of hardening Portland cement requiring water
- Curing of tobacco, to prepare it for use
- Sulfur vulcanization, the process of hardening or "curing" rubber

== Other uses ==
- Cure (surname), including a list of people with the name
- Cure (religion), the practical exercise of an ecclesiastical office
- Curate or curé, a rank of priest

== See also ==
- Kure (disambiguation)
- Remission (disambiguation)
- 21st Century Cures Act, 2016 U.S. federal legislation
