= Kyre (disambiguation) =

Kyre is a village in England.

Kyre or KYRE may also refer to:

- Scotch College, Adelaide, Australia, founded as Kyre College
- KSYC-FM, formerly KYRE, a radio station serving Yreka, California, United States
- KYRE-LP, a radio station in Texas, serving Mansfield
- Kyre, a character in the game Warhammer 40,000: Dawn of War III
- Kyre Duplessis (born 2002), American football player

== See also ==
- Kire (disambiguation)
- Kyree, given name
