= Caregiver (disambiguation) =

A caregiver or carer is an unpaid or paid person who helps another individual with an impairment with his or her activities of daily living.

Caregiver may also refer to:

- care (disambiguation)
- Caregiver (film), a 2008 Philippine film starring Sharon Cuneta
