= Cares (disambiguation) =

Cares or CARES may refer to:

- Cares, a river in Spain
- Cardiac Arrest Registry to Enhance Survival, cardiac arrest registry
- Chinese Association for Relief and Ensuing Services, non-governmental organization
- CARES Act, COVID-19 stimulus in the United States

== See also ==
- Care (disambiguation)
