= Kire =

Kire may refer to:

== People with the name ==
- Kire (surname)
- Kire Grozdanov (born 1970), Macedonian football player for FK Pelister
- Kire Markoski (born 1995), Macedonian football player for AEL Limassol
- Kire Ristevski (born 1990), Macedonian football player for Vasas

== Other uses ==
- Kireji, a category of words used in some types of Japanese poetry
- Kire language, a Ramu language of Papua New Guinea

== See also ==
- Kyre (disambiguation)
