= Karie (disambiguation) =

Karie may refer to the following:

- Karie, Indian film
- Karie (name)

== See also ==
- Kahimi Karie (album)
