= Khyree =

Khyree is a masculine given name. Notable people with the name include:

- Khyree Jackson (1999–2024), American football player
- Khyree Zienty or Ekkstacy (born 2002), Canadian musician

== See also ==
- Kyree, given name
- Kyrie (given name)
