= Kire (surname) =

Kire is a surname with multiple origins.

== Naga family name ==
- Easterine Kire (born 1959), Writer
- Khrielie-ü Kire (1918–2013), Physician

== Other derivations ==
- Ezra Kire (born 1975), American musician

== See also ==
- Kire (other meanings)
