= Hans Canon =

Austrian painter (1829–1885)

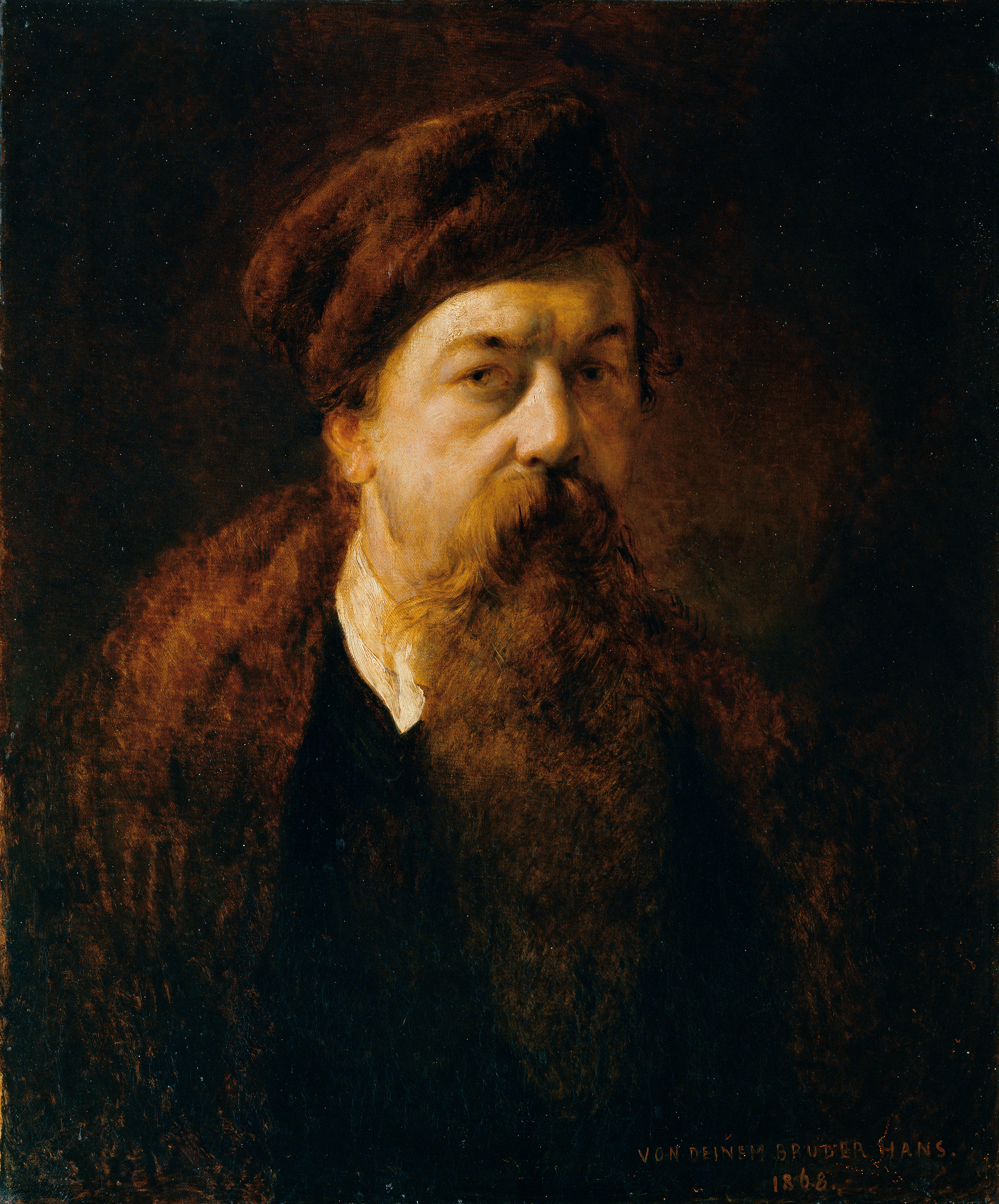
- Self-portrait, 1868
- Born: Johann Baptist Strašiřipka; 15 March 1829; Vienna, The Austrian Empire
- Died: 12 September 1885 (aged 56); Vienna, Austria-Hungary

Hans Canon was the pseudonym of Johann Baptist Strašiřipka (also rendered as Johann Baptist Straschiripka or Hans Purschka-Straschiripka) (15 March 1829, Vienna – 12 September 1885, Vienna), an Austrian history and portrait painter.

== Life ==
His father was related to the princely Starhemberg family and served as an Economic Councilor. He seems to have been an indifferent student, but he did show an interest in art so, in 1845, he was enrolled at the Academy of Fine Arts, Vienna for a brief stay, then studied privately with Ferdinand Georg Waldmüller and Carl Rahl. From 1847 to 1855, before completing his studies, he became an officer in the Austro-Hungarian Common Army and served as a cuirassier in the Hungarian Campaign.

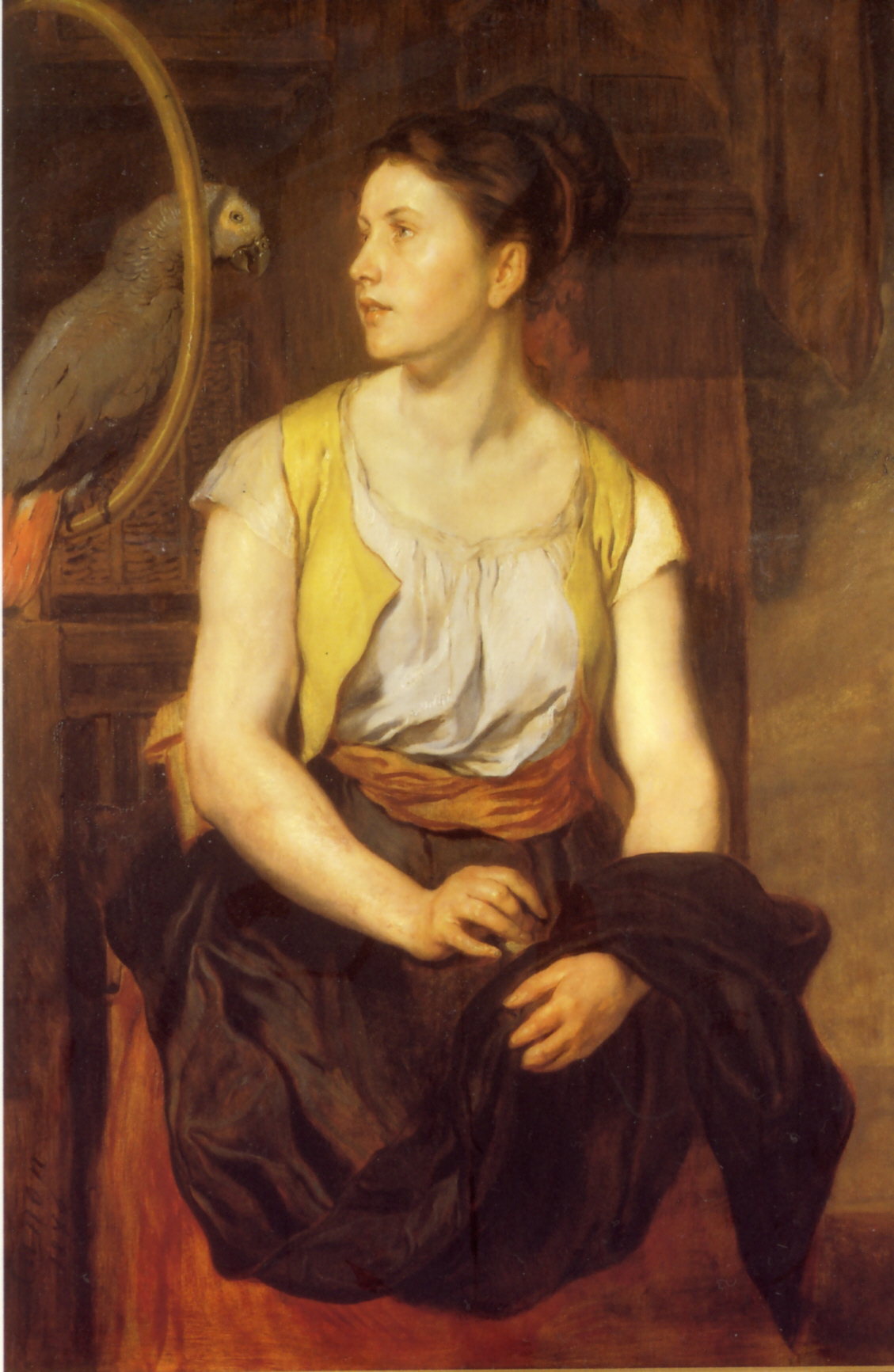
Young Woman with Parrot (1876)

His later service in the artillery appears to have provided inspiration for the name "Canon" (although the word may have other meanings), which he began using after Slavic names became a handicap, due to the various separatist movements active in the Empire at that time.f

After his obligations and studies were over, he travelled to England, France, Italy (which, unlike most Northern Europeans of the time, he did not find attractive) and the Middle East. Upon his return, he accompanied Count Johann Nepomuk Wilczek (who was not only a patron of the arts, but an explorer as well) on a trip to London to help purchase animals for the Schönbrunn Zoo.

From 1860 to 1869, he lived in Karlsruhe then, after getting married, moved to Stuttgart where he stayed until 1874, when the success of his paintings at the Vienna World's Fair (one was purchased by the Emperor) induced him to return home. In 1875, his connections with Wilczek earned him a major commission to portray the men and vessels of the Austro-Hungarian North Pole Expedition, for which task he went to Fiume, working from the original subjects and photographs. He went on to specialize in portraits, including many members of the royal family.

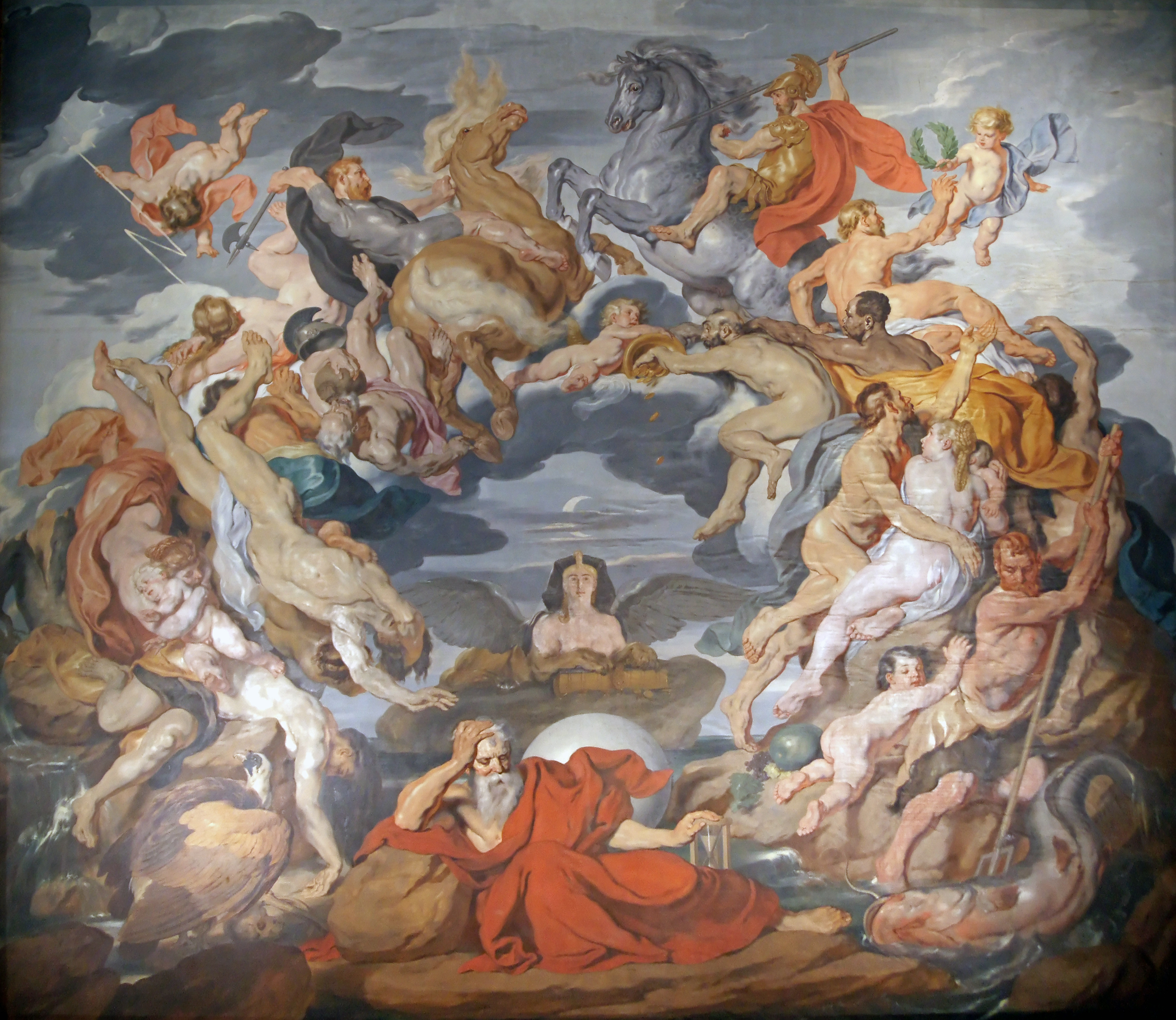
The Circle of Life (1883-1885)

In addition to his canvases, he created a series of monumental paintings in several public buildings on or near the Ringstraße. The best known of these is the colossal "Circle of Life", in the Vienna Natural History Museum. A further commission for the museum was cut short when he died suddenly, apparently from an aortic dissection.

He is buried in the Matzleinsdorf Protestant Cemetery. In 1891, a street was named after him in the Favoriten district of Vienna. A commemorative postage stamp with his portrait was issued by the Austrian Post in 1948.
