= Katrin Vohland =

German Biologist

- Vohland at the Natural History Museum, Vienna, in 2025
- Born: 29 September 1968; Hamburg
- Occupation: German biologist

Katrin Vohland (born September 29, 1968, in Hamburg) is a German biologist. Since June 1, 2020, she has served as Director General and Scientific Managing Director of the Natural History Museum, Vienna.

== Professional career ==
In 1989, Vohland began studying biology at the University of Bielefeld; in 1991, she transferred to the University of Bayreuth, where she completed her studies in 1994 with a diploma thesis on the topic of "Resource use and behavior of a ladybird beetle." Beginning in 1995, she conducted research in the Department of Tropical Ecology at the Max Planck Institute for Limnology in Plön; in 1999, she earned her doctorate from the University of Kiel with a dissertation on speciation and biodiversity in the Amazon region.

From 1999, she conducted research at the Museum für Naturkunde in Berlin on species diversity and land use in Southern Africa. In 2005, she moved to the Chair of Vegetation Ecology and Nature Conservation at the University of Potsdam. From 2006 to 2009, she was responsible for the project "Protected Areas in Germany Amidst Climate Change – Risks and Options for Action" at the Potsdam Institute for Climate Impact Research (PIK). In 2009, she returned to the Museum für Naturkunde in Berlin, where, in 2014, she assumed leadership of the research division "Science Communication and Knowledge Research." She is a member of the scientific advisory board of the Hohe Tauern National Park and the advisory board of the Austrian Citizen Science Conference 2020, where she also serves as a speaker.

Building on her work at the Museum für Naturkunde Berlin, Vohland played a key role in shaping the development of "citizen science" in Germany and Europe. In addition to establishing the German citizen science platform, she served as the executive director of the European Citizen Science Association (ECSA) from 2014 to 2018. During this period, she initiated numerous national and international networks designed to foster exchange and the scientific advancement of citizen science. These include, among others: a European citizen science platform, a COST network for scientific cooperation and mobility regarding citizen science in Europe, and the Leibniz Research Network "Citizen Science" within the German Leibniz Association....regarding the connection between citizen science and sustainability, open science, and the interfaces between science and policy. In 2021, the edited volume *The Science of Citizen Science*—for which she served as lead editor—was published. Katrin Vohland serves as a jury member for the German Non-Fiction Book Prize (*Deutscher Sachbuchpreis*) (for 2025 and 2026).

On March 13, 2020, State Secretary Ulrike Lunacek announced Vohland as the successor to Christian Köberl in the roles of Scientific Managing Director and Director General of the Natural History Museum Vienna (NHM), a position she assumed on June 1, 2020.: According to her own account, Vohland's appointment by Lunacek—who was well aware of the potential political sensitivity—triggered a "shitstorm" (an intense wave of online backlash) on a scale she had never experienced during her previous academic career in Germany. - In March 2024, her contract with the NHM (Natural History Museum) was extended by five years, running until May 31, 2030.

== Political involvement ==
Since the 1990s, Vohland has been active with the German Green Party (Bündnis 90/Die Grünen). From 2004, she served as chair of the Potsdam district branch, and from 2005 to 2007, she was the state chair of the Greens' Brandenburg chapter. In 2007, she was succeeded in this role by Ska Keller. After she was presented as Director General of the Natural History Museum Vienna by State Secretary Ulrike Lunacek (The Greens) in March 2020, Lunacek stated that Vohland would place her party membership in the German Green Party on hold. Following her appointment by Lunacek—who was well aware of the potential political sensitivity—Vohland faced a "shitstorm" (an intense wave of online criticism), the likes of which she had not experienced during her previous scientific career in Germany.
