= Center for Urban and Regional Analysis =

Ohio State University unit

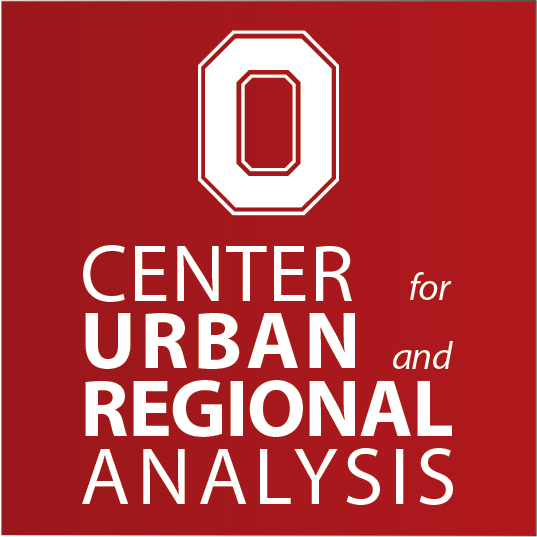
Center for Urban and Regional Analysis logo.

The Center for Urban and Regional Analysis (CURA) is an interdisciplinary research organization of Ohio State University. CURA's mission is to serve as a bridge across academia, industry, and the policy sector by providing spatial analysis of economic, social, environmental, and health issues in urban and regional settings in Ohio and beyond. The organization explores various social, political, economic, geographic, economic, and public health issues using Geographic Information Systems (GIS) and other spatial analysis techniques. CURA also offers a speaker series which brings a wide range of speakers to campus each semester.

== History ==
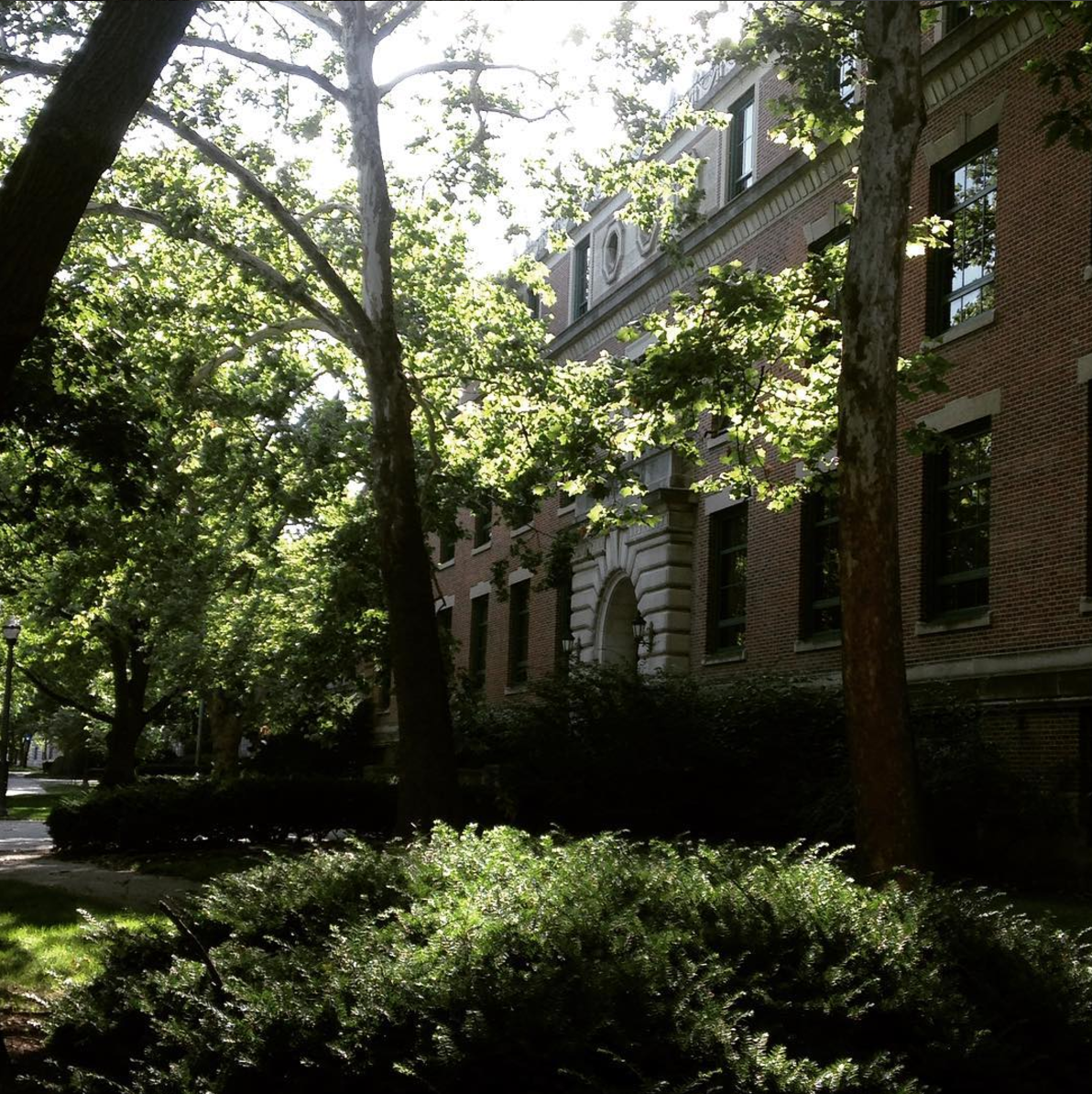
CURA is located in Derby Hall, on the Oval at Ohio State.

The movement for an urban center began in 1995 with a recommendation from the Committee on Applied Social and Public Policy. Funding followed three years later in 1998. CURA then was formed at The Ohio State University in 1999 as the Urban and Regional Analysis Initiative (URAI). Two years later, in April 2001, the organization officially renamed itself the Center for Urban & Regional Analysis and was given final approval by the board of trustees. The change was announced in the university's newspaper, The Lantern. The organization was projected to receive $240,000 per year in funding from the state of Ohio along with an additional $150,000 from the Office of Academic Affairs.

== Research ==
CURA has conducted extensive research and analysis on various topics such as air traffic, urban growth, land use, food accessibility, crime, housing, and data mapping through GIS technology. It is one of just eight Ohio Urban University Program (UUP) research institutes. The center provides a place for researchers from many fields to collaborate on critical urban issues.

=== Partners ===
The Center for Urban and Regional Analysis is closely associated with Ohio State's Austin E. Knowlton School of Architecture and the Geography Department but collaborates with a wide range of departments and centers at Ohio State including:

- The Center for Human Resource Research (CHRR)
- The Kirwan Institute
- The Food Innovation Center
- The Center for Aviation Studies
- Chadwick Arboretum and Learning Gardens
- Ohio State Facilities Operations and Development

== Projects ==
=== Data Hosting ===
In June 2013, CURA, in collaboration with the Chadwick Arboretum and Learning Gardens, completed a web-based Tree Tour of Ohio State's historic Oval. The Story Map, hosted on ArcGIS.com, provides the user with a guided walking tour of 32 significant and historic trees along with information about each tree's environmental and financial benefits.

=== Cartography ===
In partnership with the Kirwan Institute of Ohio State, CURA is working to digitize Ohio's redlining maps from the 1930s.

=== Spatial Analysis ===
Ohio State's Food Innovation Center and the Mid-Ohio Foodbank are working with CURA and using GIS to find ways to increase the equity of fresh food distribution.

=== Data Visualization ===
CURA partnered with Center for Aviation Studies at OSU to create maps displaying the accessibility of domestic air service in the United States. The maps show data for over 400 airports with an index describing the level of air service of a given region. The project requires the continued input of data to show how the accessibility of given airports changes over time. Graduate Affiliate Kejing Peng created a detailed web application displaying the results of the air traffic analysis. The T100 Airport Traffic Analysis is both interactive and informative to users, providing a great deal of information on individual airports across the country.

With Ohio State's Facilities Operations and Development, CURA Graduate Associate Shaun Fontanella is planning to develop digital signs for central buildings on campus. The signs will display and track energy consumption of each building in order to encourage decreased consumption.
