= Kure (disambiguation) =

Kure may refer to:

== Places ==
- Kure, Hiroshima (呉), a city in Hiroshima prefecture, Japan
  - Kure Line, a rail line in the city
  - Kure Naval Base
  - Kure Station, a railway station on the Kure Line
- Kure Atoll, an island in the Pacific Ocean, part of Hawaii
- Kure Beach, North Carolina, a town near Wilmington and part of its metropolitan area
- Küre, Kastamonu, a town and district of Kastamonu Province, Turkey
  - Küre Mountain, a mountain at Bartın and Kastamonu provinces
  - Küre Brook, a small river near İnebolu, Kastamonu Province
- Küre, Bilecik, a town in Söğüt district of Bilecik Province, Turkey
- Küre Mountains, a mountain range in Turkey

== People ==
- Inge Kure (born 1965), Dutch cricket player
- Urve Kure (born 1931), Estonian chess player
- Yuki Kure (呉 由姫), Japanese manga artist and illustrator

== Organizations ==
- KURE, a radio station (88.5 FM) licensed to serve Ames, Iowa, United States
- KURE-LP, a low-power radio station (106.1 FM) licensed to serve Eloy, Arizona, United States
- Kure Software Koubou, Japanese video game development company

== See also ==
- Cure (disambiguation)
