= Kyrre =

Kyrre is a common Norwegian given name. The name comes from the Old Norse word kyrr, which translates to "calm, peaceful". It is believed to have been derived from Olaf III of Norway, who was nicknamed "Olaf Kyrre" (Olaf the Peaceful).

== People named Kyrre ==
As first name

- Kyrre Andreassen, Norwegian author
- Kyrre Haugen Bakke, Norwegian actor and translator
- Kyrre Eggen, Norwegian lawyer
- Kyrre Fritzner, Norwegian musician
- Kyrre Grepp (1879–1922), Norwegian politician
- Kyrre Gørvell-Dahll (born 1991), Norwegian DJ, known by stage name Kygo
- Kyrre Hellum, Norwegian actor
- Kyrre Holm Johannessen, Norwegian host
- Kyrre Lekve (born 1968), Norwegian biologist
- Kyrre Lindanger, Norwegian politician
- Kyrre Nakkim (born 1966), Norwegian journalist
- Kyrre Haugen Sydness, Norwegian actor
- Kyrre Sæther, Norwegian author and humorist

As second name

- Kristen Kyrre Bremer, Norwegian theologian and bishop

== See also ==
- Karre
