= Karve (surname) =

Karve is an Indian surname.

== Notable people ==
Notable people with this surname include:

- Bal Karve (1930–2025), Indian actor
- Dattatreya Gopal Karve (1898–1967), Indian economist
- Dhondo Keshav Karve (1858–1962), Indian social reformer, also known as Maharishi Karve
- Krishnaji Gopal Karve (1887–1910), Indian freedom fighter
- Irawati Karve (1905–1970), Indian anthropologist
- Raghunath Dhondo Karve (1882–1953), Indian professor of mathematics

== See also ==
- Karve (disambiguation)
- Karie (name)
- Karre
