= Cure (surname) =

Cure is a surname, and may refer to:

- Alfred Capel-Cure (1826–1896), British Army officer and photography pioneer
- Amy Cure (born 1992), Australian track cyclist
- Carlos Cure (born 1944), Colombian diplomat
- Cornelius Cure (died 1607), English sculptor
- Nigel Capel-Cure (1908–2004), English cricketer
- Öznur Cüre (born 1997), Turkish Paralympic archer

== See also ==
- Cure (disambiguation)
