= Karreh-ye Olya =

Karreh-ye Olya كره عليا
- Village
- Country: Iran
- Province: Kohgiluyeh and Boyer-Ahmad
- County: Dana
- Bakhsh: Central
- Rural District: Tut-e Nadeh

Population (2006)
  - Total: 185
- Time zone: UTC+3:30 (IRST)
  - Summer (DST): UTC+4:30 (IRDT)

Karreh-ye Olya (Persian: كره عليا, also Romanized as Karreh-ye ‘Olyā) is a village in Tut-e Nadeh Rural District, in the Central District of Dana County, Kohgiluyeh and Boyer-Ahmad Province, Iran. At the 2006 census, its population was 185, in 40 families.
