= Rivière du Curé =

- Location of the mouth of the river in Quebec City

Location
- Country: Canada
- Province: Quebec
- Region: Capitale-Nationale
- Cities: Quebec City
- Municipalities: Saint-Augustin-de-Desmaures

Physical characteristics
- Source: Confluence of two streams
  - location: Saint-Augustin-de-Desmaures in Quebec (city)
  - coordinates: 46.74038°N 71.43383°W
  - elevation: 77
- Mouth: St. Lawrence River
  - location: Saint-Augustin-de-Desmaures in Quebec (city)
  - coordinates: 46.73°N 71.43916°W
  - elevation: 4 m
- Length: 1.7 km (1.1 mi)

Basin features
- River system: Saint Lawrence River

The Rivière du Curé (English: Priest's river or Curé River) is a tributary of the northwest shore of the Saint-Laurent River, flowing in the municipality of Saint-Augustin-de-Desmaures, in Agglomération de Québec, in the administrative region of Capitale-Nationale, in the province from Quebec, to Canada.

The Rivière du Curé's valley is mainly served by chemin du Roy and chemin Tessier, especially for the needs of residents in the urban area of Saint-Augustin-de-Desmaures.

The surface of the Curé River (except the rapids areas) is generally frozen from the beginning of December to the end of March; safe circulation on the ice is generally done from the end of December to the beginning of March. The water level of the river varies with the seasons and the precipitation; the spring flood occurs in March or April.

== Geography ==
The Curé River has its source at the confluence of two urban streams, on the west side of the hamlet Le Faubourg-L'Erpinière in Saint-Augustin-de-Desmaures. This source is located 1.0 kilometre (0.62 mi) southeast of route 138, 2.1 kilometres (1.3 mi) northeast of downtown village of Saint-Augustin-de-Desmaures, 0.85 kilometres (0.53 mi) north-west of the Saint Lawrence River, 1.2 kilometres (0.75 mi) north of the mouth of the Curé River.

From its source, the Curé River flows for a distance of 1.7 kilometres (1.1 mi), with a drop of 73 metres (240 ft), forming a curve towards the west as it approaches from the village of Saint-Augustin-de-Desmaures, along the northeast limit of the Parc des Hauts-Fonds and down a cliff of 40 metres (130 ft).

The Curé River flows into Anse à Gagnon on the northwest bank of the St. Lawrence River. This confluence is located 11.4 kilometres (7.1 mi) southwest of the Pierre Laporte Bridge, 1.9 kilometres (1.2 mi) east of the center of Saint-Augustin-de-Desmaures.

== Toponymy ==
The toponym "Rivière du Curé" was formalized on March 9, 19838 at the Commission de toponymie du Québec.

== Appendices ==
=== Related articles ===
- Agglomeration of Quebec
- Saint-Augustin-de-Desmaures
- List of rivers of Quebec
