= María Renée Cura =

Argentine geographer, writer and Indologist

- Born: Argentina
- Died: 12 July 2007
- Occupation(s): Geographer, writer
- Awards: Padma Shri

María Renée Cura was an Argentine geographer, writer and Indologist. She was the founder of Anand Bhavan, a centre for Indological studies, at her native place, Chivilcoy in Buenos Aires, Argentina, named after the present day Allahabad museum and the former residence of Nehru family.

== Works ==
Cura authored several books, Islas Malvinas y Antártida Argentina, Islas Malvinas y Antártida Argentina and Islas Malvinas, Georgias, Sandwich del Sur y Antártida Argentina being some of the notable ones. She also translated the Letters to the Young People, a work by Indira Gandhi, and started a magazine, India eterna y actual, in 1987 which became defunct after her death. She was the president of the South Foundation, founded by Victoria Ocampo and maintained close associations with the Argentine intellectual and Indira Gandhi, the former prime minister of India. The Government of India awarded her the fourth highest Indian civilian honour of Padma Shri in 1984. Cura died on 12 July 2007.

== See also ==
- Lists of writers
- Victoria Ocampo
- Indira Gandhi
