= Friedrich Martin Berwerth =

Austrian mineralogist and petrographer

Friedrich Martin Berwerth (16 November 1850, Schäßburg – 22 September 1918, Vienna) was an Austrian mineralogist and petrographer known for his work with meteorites.

He was a student at the Universities of Vienna, Graz and Heidelberg, and following graduation, worked as an assistant to Gustav Tschermak von Seysenegg at the Mineralogisch-Petrographischen Institut in Vienna (1874). Later the same year, he began work as an assistant at the Imperial Hofmineralien Cabinet. In 1888 he became a curator, followed by titles of leiter (1895) and director (1904) of the mineralogy-petrography department.

From 1888 he was a privat-docent of petrography at the University of Vienna, where in 1894, he became an associate professor, and in 1907, attained a full professorship. In 1901, with August von Loehr, he founded the Wiener Mineralogische Gesellschaft (in 1947 the name of the association was changed to Österreichische Mineralogische Gesellschaft).

== Written works ==
- Mikroskopische Structurbilder der Massengesteine in farbigen Lithographien, 1900.
- Verzeichnis der Meteoriten im K.K. Naturhistorischen Hofmuseum Ende Oktober 1902, (1903).
- "Steel and Meteoric Iron, &c", published in 1908 in English.
- Ein natürliches System der Eisenmeteoriten, 1914.
- "On the origin of meteorites", published in 1917 in English (Translation from German of a lecture given in the Scientific club of Vienna on 26 January 1914).
