= Kyrie (given name) =

- Pronunciation: /ˈkaɪri/
- Gender: Male or Female

Origin
- Origin: Greek: Κύριε
- Meaning: "Lord (vocative case)"

Kyrie is a unisex given name. Notable people with the name include:

- Kyrie Irving (born 1992), American basketball player
- Kyrie Kristmanson (born 1989 or 1990), Canadian singer, songwriter, and musician
- Kyrie O'Connor (born 1954), American writer and newspaper editor
- Kyrie Wilson (born 1992), American gridiron football player

== Fictional characters ==
- Kyrie, the female lead in the video game Devil May Cry 4
- Kyrie, the female lead of Tin Can Audio's fiction podcast The Tower
- Kyrie Canaan, a female character in the video game Final Fantasy VII Remake and the novel Final Fantasy VII The Kids Are Alright: A Turks Side Story
- Kyrie Florian, a female main character in the game Mahou Shoujo Lyrical Nanoha A's Portable: The Gears of Destiny
- Kyrie Illunis, male protagonist of the Nintendo DS video game Sands of Destruction
- Kyrie Ushiromiya, a female supporting character in the visual novel, manga, and anime series Umineko no Naku Koro ni

== See also ==
- Khyree, given name
- Kyree, given name
- Karie (name)
