= Remission =

Remission often refers to:

- Forgiveness

Remission may also refer to:

== Healthcare and science ==
- Remission (medicine), absence of active disease after chronic illness
- Remission (spectroscopy), the reflection or scattering of light by a material

== Law ==
- Clemency, the reduction of a prison sentence
- Remand (court procedure), legal proceedings by which a case is sent back to a lower court from which it was appealed, with instructions for further proceedings

== Music ==
- Remission (EP), a 1984 extended play record by Skinny Puppy
- Remission (Mastodon album), the debut album by the American metal band Mastodon

== See also ==
- Re-Mission, a 2006 video game for young cancer patients
- Remittance
