= Hermann Wichelhaus =

German chemist (1842–1927)

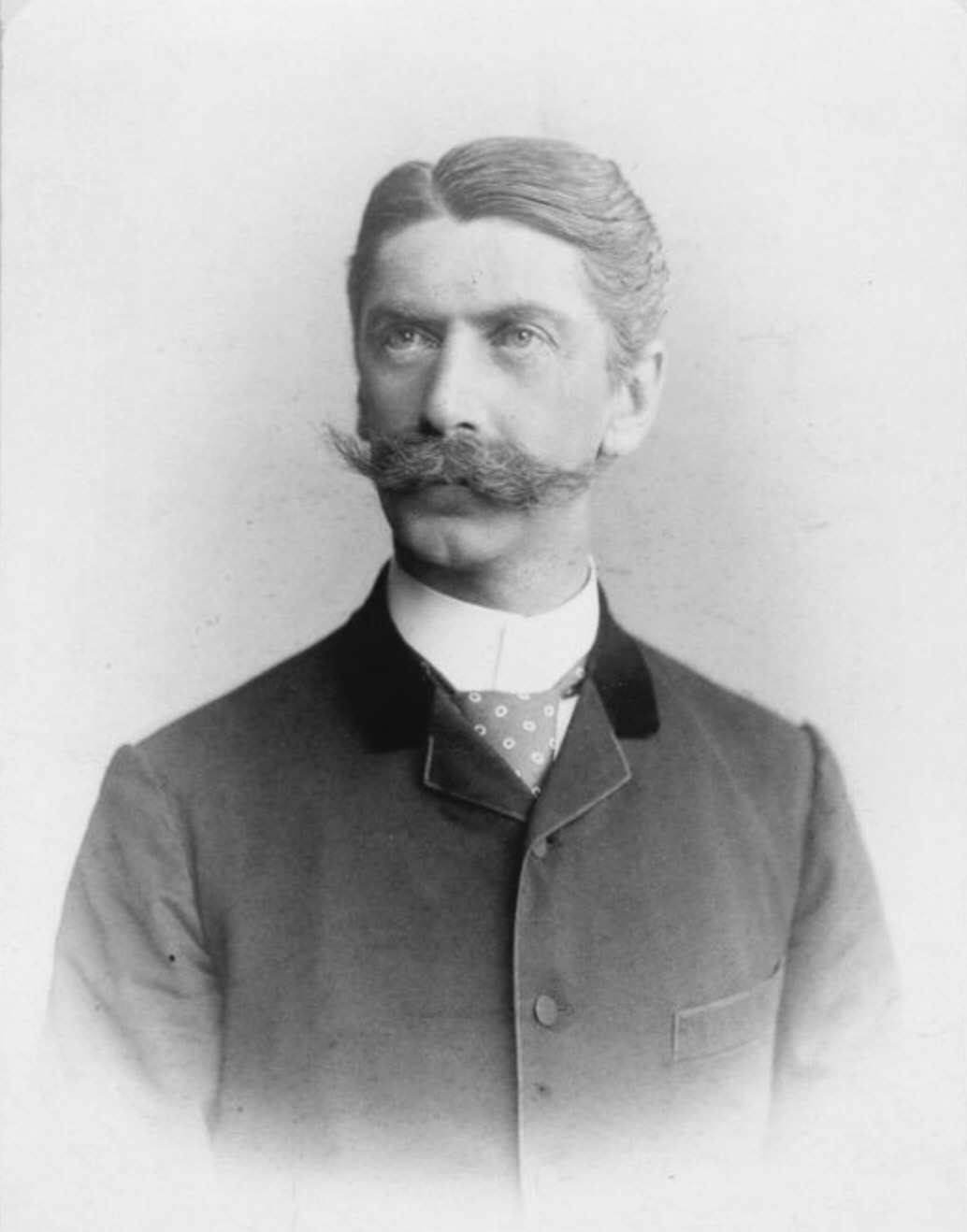
Karl Hermann Wichelhaus (ca. 1880)

Karl Hermann Wichelhaus (8 January 1842, Elberfeld – 28 February 1927, Heidelberg) was a German chemist.

He studied chemistry at the universities of Bonn, Göttingen, where he became member of Burschenschaft Hannovera (fraternity) and Ghent, and also trained in London. In 1863 he received his doctorate from the University of Heidelberg, and four years later, obtained his habilitation at Berlin. From 1871 to 1916 he was a professor of chemical technology at the University of Berlin.

In 1867 he was one of the founders of the Deutsche Chemische Gesellschaft (German Chemical Society). He is credited for establishing the first technological institute at the University of Berlin.

His research mostly dealt with the chemistry of aromatic compounds. He is remembered for his early investigations of the benzene structure known as the Dewar benzene. In 1868 he introduced the term valenz (valence) into chemistry.

== Selected works ==
- Populäre Vorlesungen über chemische Technologie, 1902 – Popular lectures on chemical technology.
- Vorlesungen über chemische Technologie, 1906 – Lectures on chemical technology.
- Sulfurieren, Alkalischmelze der Sulfosäuren, Esterifizieren, 1911 – Sulfurization, alkali fusion of sulfonic acids, Esterification.
- Der Stärkezucker, chemisch und technologisch behandelt, 1913 – Starch sugar, chemical and technological treatment.
