= Henry Care =

British journalist

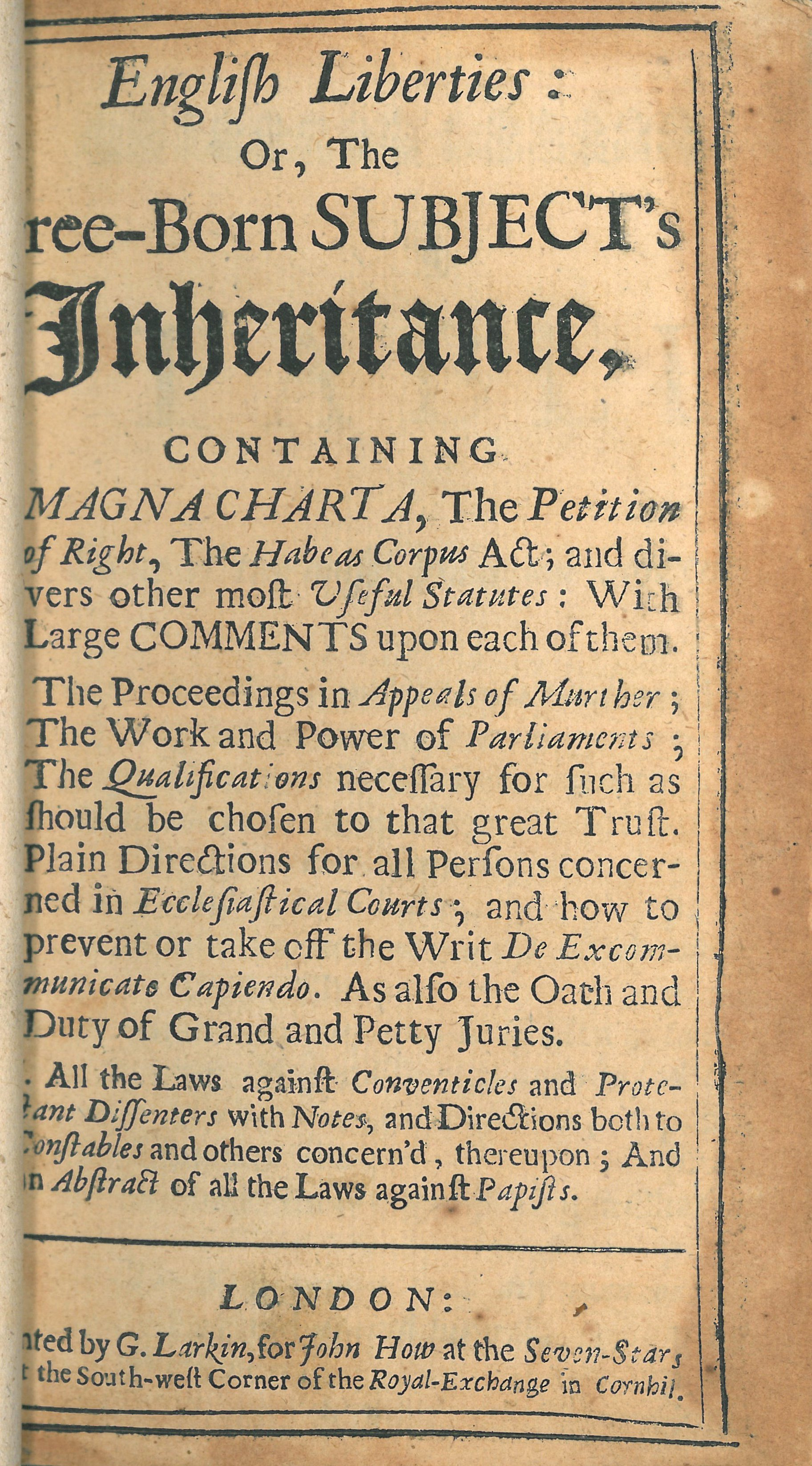
The title page of English Liberties: or, the Free-born Subject's Inheritance (1st ed., 1682?), believed to have been written by Care

Henry Care (1646–1688) was an English political writer and journalist, or "Whig propagandist", whose specialty was anti-Catholicism.

== Life ==
Care edited a paper called the Weekly Pacquet of Advice from Rome. It began as a serial publication covering the history of the Protestant Reformation. After the publicity for the alleged Popish Plot of 1678, he wrote against the Church of England and its members, then supposed by some to be deeply inclined towards popery. He was tried at Guildhall, 2 July 1680, on an information against him as the author of this journal, and more particularly for a clause against the lord chief justice, William Scroggs, who himself sat as judge at the trial. The jury found him guilty, and Care was prohibited from printing his journal.

These proceedings then constituted one of the charges brought against Scroggs, who was removed from the bench some months later, and Care continued to publish. Care's last number of the Weekly Pacquet, which extended to five volumes, is dated 13 July 1683, at which time he fell ill. In 1682 Care fell out with Langley Curtis, the original publisher; Care, who lived at the time in the Great Old Bailey, continued to work on his own account. But at the start of the quarrel, Curtis, employed William Salmon, another writer, to publish a continuation of the Pacquets, and he did so from 25 August 1682, the same day as Care's fifth volume also began, until 4 May 1683.

The English Liberties (1680, in later versions often British Liberties) was a cheap polemical book that was influential and much-reprinted, in the American colonies as well as Britain, and made Magna Carta central to the history and the contemporary legitimacy of its subject. The Excellent Privilege of Liberty (1687), an American book generally attributed to William Penn, reprinted the text of both Magna Carta (its first American printing) and (without attributing it) English Liberties.

== Legacy ==
The English Liberties continued to be reprinted until the late 18th century. A two-volume adaptation of the Weekly Pacquet, under the title The History of Popery, appeared anonymously in 1735–6.
