= Kare language =

Kare language may be:

- Kare language (Papuan)
- Kare language (Bantu)
- Kare language (Adamawa)
