= Kureh-ye Olya =

Kureh-ye Olya كوره عليا
- Village
- Location within Iran
- Coordinates: 37°50′35″N 44°53′11″E
- Country: Iran
- Province: West Azerbaijan
- County: Urmia
- Bakhsh: Anzal
- Rural District: Anzal-e Jonubi

Population (2006)
  - Total: 220
- Time zone: UTC+3:30 (IRST)
  - Summer (DST): UTC+4:30 (IRDT)

Kureh-ye Olya (Persian: كوره عليا, also Romanized as Kūreh-ye ‘Olyā; also known as Kūreh-ye Bālā) is a village in Anzal-e Jonubi Rural District, Anzal District, Urmia County, West Azerbaijan Province, Iran. At the 2006 census, its population was 220, in 42 families.
