= CAIR =

CAIR or Cair may refer to:

== Acronyms ==
- Carboxyaminoimidazole ribotide, a biochemical intermediate nucleotide
- Centre for Artificial Intelligence and Robotics, Indian national defence laboratory
- Clean Air Interstate Rule, US environmental regulation
- Council on American–Islamic Relations, American Muslim advocacy organization

== Geography ==
- Cair, an alternate spelling of caer, a Welsh placename element referring to strongholds
- Čair Municipality, municipality of Skopje, Republic of North Macedonia

=== Fictional ===
- Cair Andros, a fictional island in Tolkien's fiction
- Cair Paravel, a castle from C. S. Lewis' The Chronicles of Narnia
