= Kyree =

Kyree is a given name. Notable people with the name include:

- Kyree King (born 1994), American sprinter
- Kyree Walker (born 2000), American basketball player

== See also ==
- Khyree, given name
- Kyrie (given name)
