= Chadwick Arboretum =

Arboretum at Ohio State University

Coordinates: 40°00′34″N 83°01′47″W

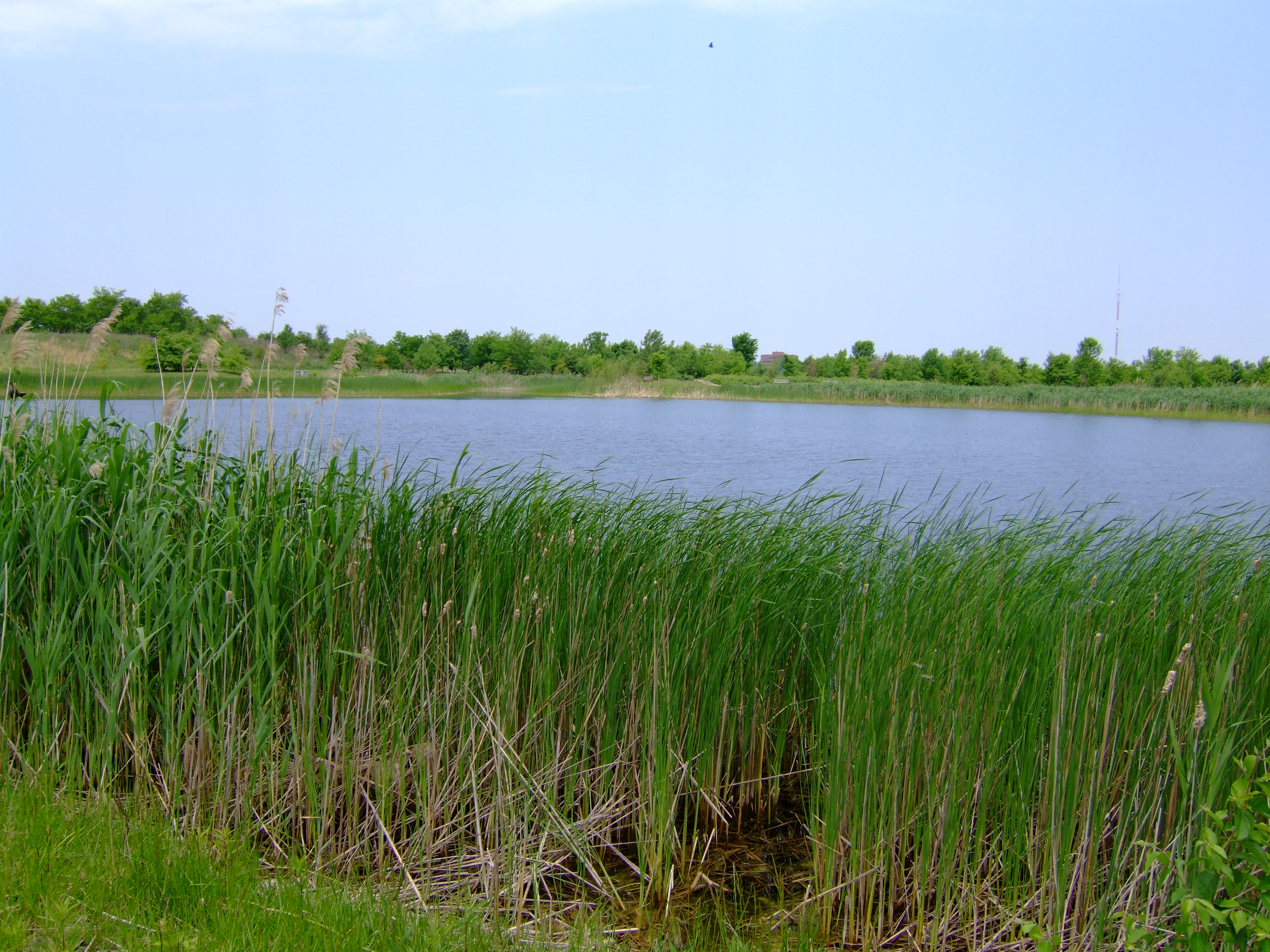
- Chadwick Lake
- Interactive map of Chadwick Arboretum
- Type: Arboretum
- Nearest city: Columbus, Ohio
- Area: 62 acres (25 ha)
- Established: 1980
- Opened: 1981
- Operator: Ohio State University
- Website: chadwickarboretum.osu.edu

Chadwick Arboretum is a 62 acres (25 ha) arboretum on the Agriculture campus of Ohio State University, in Columbus, Ohio, United States. The main arboretum collection is located just across Lane Avenue from the Schottenstein Center with its other collections nearby. The arboretum is open daily without charge.

The arboretum proper contains roughly 1,000 trees representing over 120 species that grow throughout Ohio, with special collections of conifers and willows. As of 2005, it contained one Ohio State Champion tree, Abies cephalonica.

The arboretum also includes a Learning Garden and specialized gardens for annuals, hostas, perennials, roses, and wildflowers. Taken together, these gardens represent one of the most varied collections of flora in the state, with good selections of native Ohio plants, perennials, tropical plants, wildflowers, woody plants, and more than 400 cultivars of annuals.

== See also ==
- List of botanical gardens in the United States
