= Karie (name) =

Karie is a given name and a surname. Notable people referred to by this name include the following:

== Given name ==
- Karie Murphy, is a political activist
- Karie Ross (born 1958/9), sports broadcaster

== Surname ==
- Kahimi Karie (born 1968), Japanese musician
- Sharif Karie (born 1978), American middle-distance athlete

== See also ==
- Kare (surname)
- Karre
- Karrie
- Carie Graves
- Kare (surname)
- Kari (name)
- Kariel
- Kariem Hussein
- Karien
- Karim
- Karin (given name)
- Karle (name)
- Karve (surname)
- Kyrie (given name)
