= Koreh, South Khorasan =

Koroh كره
- Village
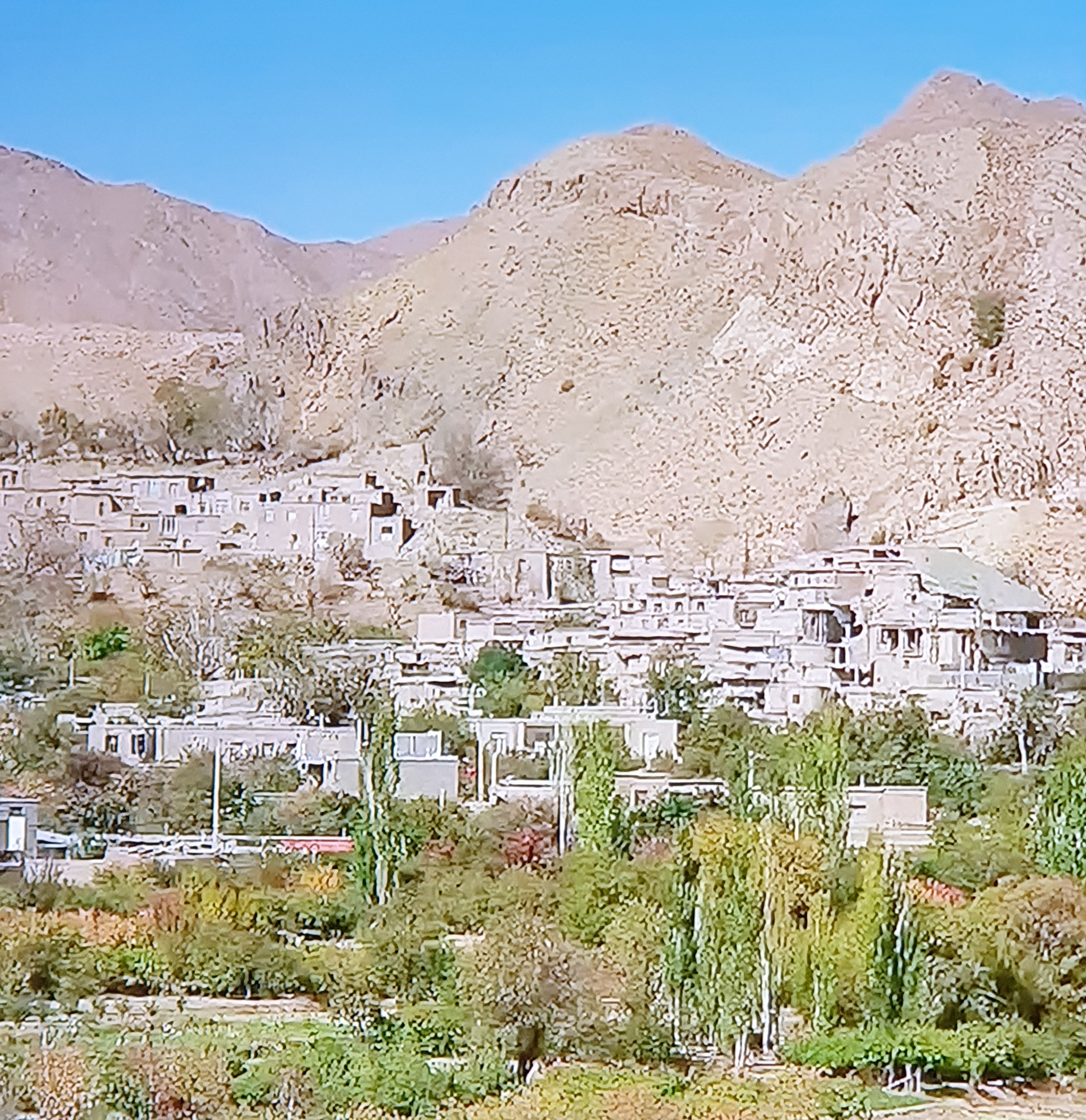
- Koreh village, South Khorasan Province, Iran

- Location within Iran
- Coordinates: 33°40′32″N 58°57′54″E
- Country: Iran
- Province: South Khorasan
- County: Qaen
- Bakhsh: Central
- Rural District: Qaen

Population (2006)
  - Total: 365
- Time zone: UTC+3:30 (IRST)
  - Summer (DST): UTC+4:30 (IRDT)

Koreh (Persian: كره, also Romanized as Koroh; also known as Kūr Au) is a village in Qaen Rural District, in the Central District of Qaen County, South Khorasan Province, Iran. At the 2006 census, its population was 365, in 127 families.
