= Karre =

Karre is a Dutch surname, derived from the Gaulish word carrum meaning 'cart' or 'wagon', most likely left over from Gallia Belgica. It is also a Telugu surname, spelled కర్రె. Found in France as Carron or Carrier, which both have the same meaning. Kärre is a given name and surname. Notable people referred to by this name include the following:

== Surname ==
- Karre Mastanamma (1911–2018), Indian centenarian
- Klas Kärre (born 1954), Swedish immunologist

== See also ==
- Kare (surname)
- Karie (name)
- Karle (name)
- KARR (disambiguation)
- Karra (name)
- Karreh (disambiguation)
- Karren (name)
- Karrer
- Karres
- Karri (name)
- Karve (surname)
- Kyrre (disambiguation)
