= Credit Abuse Resistance Education =

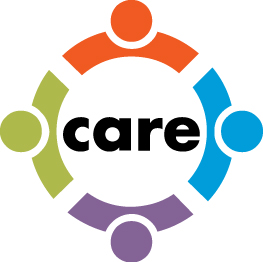
CARE Logo

Credit Abuse Resistance Education (CARE) is an American financial literacy program founded by the U.S. Bankruptcy Court, WDNY and the Bankruptcy Committee of the Monroe County Bar Association. It was founded in 2002 by U.S. Bankruptcy Court, Chief Judge John C. Ninfo, II (retired).

CARE is a free financial literacy initiative that makes experienced members of the Bankruptcy Community available to teach the importance of financial education. These presentations are available to educational establishments. CARE's primary target is high school seniors and college freshmen who are most at risk because they are aggressively marketed by the credit card industry at a time when they carry a very low Financial I.Q.

== Structure ==
CARE has a presence in all 50 states and the District of Columbia.

=== CARE Advisory Board ===
- Judge John C. Ninfo, II; U.S. Bankruptcy Court, Western District of New York - retired
- Paul Groschadl; Woods Oviatt Gilman, LLP
- Joe Schorer; Kirkland & Ellis LLP
- Allen Guon; Shaw Gussis Fishman Glantz Wolfson & Towbin LLC

=== CARE Judicial Advisory Board ===
- David D. Bird; Clerk, U.S. Bankruptcy Court, District of Delaware
- Brad Bolton; Clerk, U.S. Bankruptcy Court, District of Colorado
- Judge Sidney B. Brooks;U.S. Bankruptcy Court, District of Colorado
- Judge Carla E. Craig; U.S. Bankruptcy Court, Eastern District of New York
- Judge Dennis R. Dow; U.S. Bankruptcy Court, Western District of Missouri
- Judge A. Benjamin Goldgar; U.S. Bankruptcy Court, Northern District of Illinois, Eastern Division
- Judge Jeffery P. Hopkins; U.S. Bankruptcy Court, Southern District of Ohio
- Judge Laurel Myerson Isicoff; U.S. Bankruptcy Court, Southern District of Florida
- Judge Margaret M. Mann; U.S. Bankruptcy Court, Southern District of California
- Judge Catherine Peek McEwen; U.S. Bankruptcy Court, Middle District of Florida
- Judge C. Ray Mullins; U.S. Bankruptcy Court, Northern District of Georgia
- Judge Pamela Pepper; U.S. Bankruptcy Court, Eastern District of Wisconsin
- Judge Barry Russell; U.S. Bankruptcy Court, Central District of California
- Judge Paul R. Warren; U.S. Bankruptcy Court, Western District of New York
