= Kureh-ye Sofla =

Kureh-ye Sofla كوره سفلي
- Village
- Location within Iran
- Coordinates: 37°50′58″N 44°54′46″E
- Country: Iran
- Province: West Azerbaijan
- County: Urmia
- Bakhsh: Anzal
- Rural District: Anzal-e Jonubi

Population (2006)
  - Total: 318
- Time zone: UTC+3:30 (IRST)
  - Summer (DST): UTC+4:30 (IRDT)

Kureh-ye Sofla (Persian: كوره سفلي, also Romanized as Kūreh-ye Soflá; also known as Kūreh-ye Pā'īn) is a village in Anzal-e Jonubi Rural District, Anzal District, Urmia County, West Azerbaijan Province, Iran. At the 2006 census, its population was 318, in 54 families.
