= Karreh Dan Zizi =

Karreh Dan Zizi كره دان زيزي
- Village
- Location within Iran
- Coordinates: 30°40′39″N 51°14′55″E
- Country: Iran
- Province: Kohgiluyeh and Boyer-Ahmad
- County: Boyer-Ahmad
- Bakhsh: Ludab
- Rural District: Ludab

Population (2006)
  - Total: 39
- Time zone: UTC+3:30 (IRST)
  - Summer (DST): UTC+4:30 (IRDT)

Karreh Dan Zizi (Persian: كره دان زيزي, also Romanized as Karreh Dān Zīzī; also known as Karrehdān) is a village in Ludab Rural District, Ludab District, Boyer-Ahmad County, Kohgiluyeh and Boyer-Ahmad Province, Iran. At the 2006 census, its population was 39, in 9 families.
