= Carpet America Recovery Effort =

- Founded: January 8, 2002
- Type: Joint government-industry non-profit
- Purpose: Carpet Recycling
- Origins: Memorandum of Understanding for Carpet Stewardship (MOU)
- Region served: United States of America
- Website: https://www.carpetrecovery.org/

The Carpet America Recovery Effort or CARE is a joint industry-government non-profit organization whose mission is to develop market-based solutions for recovering value from discarded carpet. CARE was established on January 8, 2002 and their initial goals included a 10-year plan to increase the recycling and reuse of post-use carpet materials. CARE is led by voluntary partnerships and funded by its industry members. The CARE reclamation network consists of CARE facilities around the United States that collect used carpet. Since its start in 2002, CARE has expanded its reclamation network from 5 to 58, and its members have diverted over one billion pounds of post-consumer carpet from landfills. In 2012, CARE issued a report detailing the progress made towards these goals. CARE members include independent carpet recyclers, carpet manufacturers, dealers, retailers and suppliers, and non-governmental organizations.

CARE serves as the carpet stewardship organization for the State of California. CARE members have collected and recycled over a billion pounds of carpet in the state since the California Carpet Stewardship Program began in 2011.

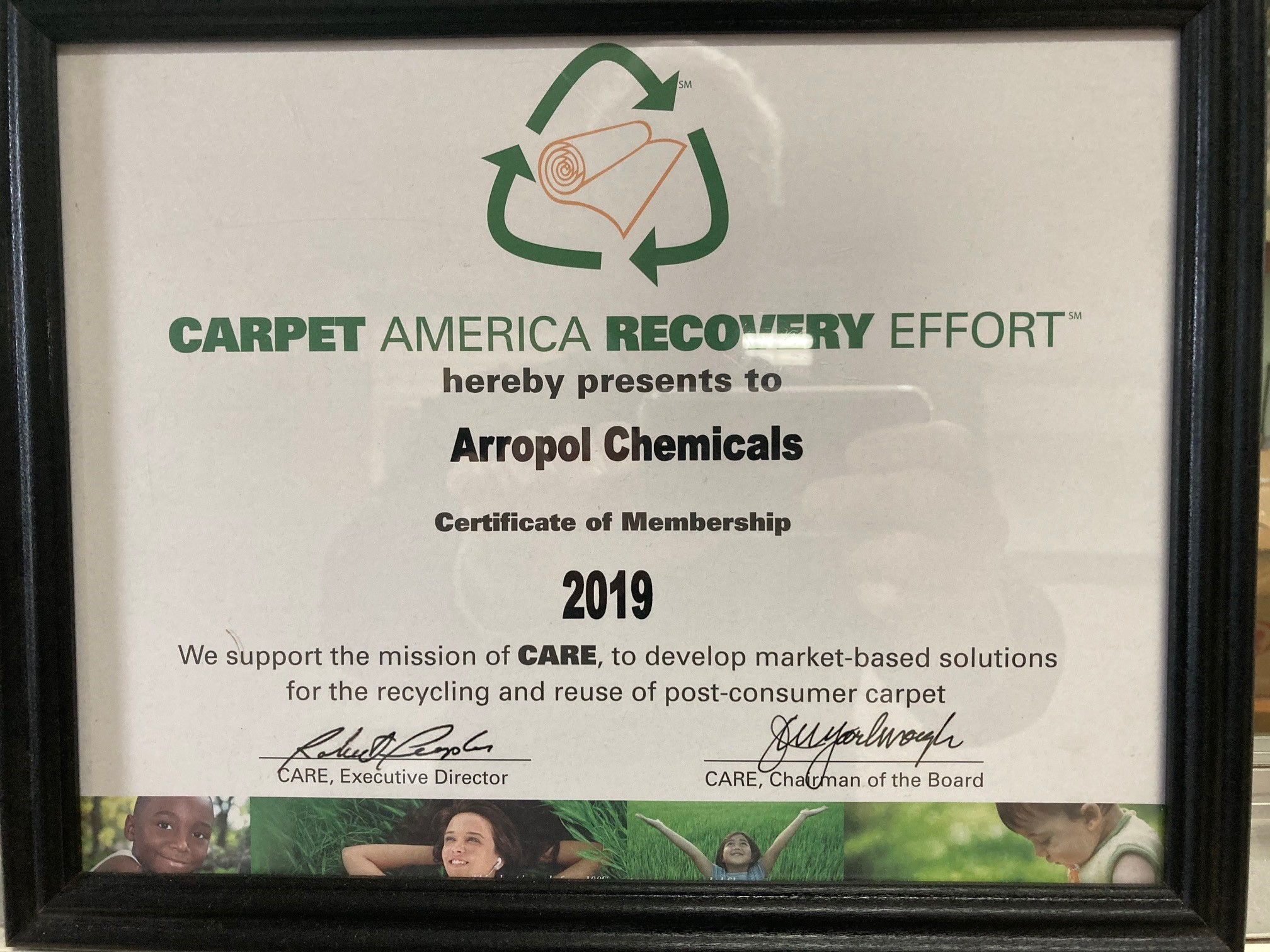
C.A.R.E Certificate

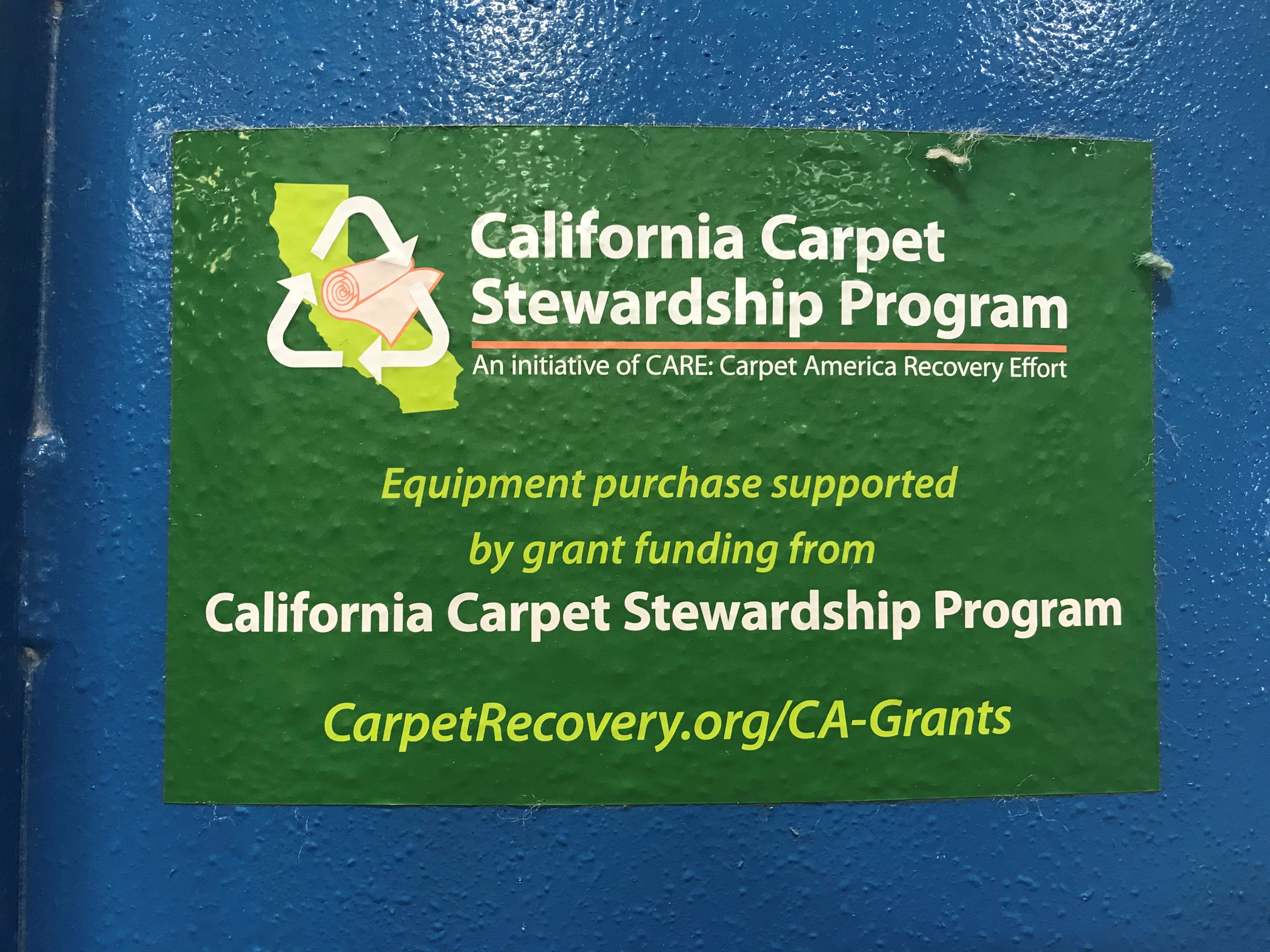
Label on densification of recovered carpet equipment
