= Karey =

Karey may refer to:

== People ==
- Karey Dornetto (fl. 2002–present), American screenwriter
- Karey Hanks (fl. 2016–2018), American politician
- Karey Kirkpatrick (fl. 1996–present), American screenwriter
- Karey Lee Woolsey (born 1976), American singer-songwriter

== Languages ==
- Karey language, spoken on the Aru Islands of eastern Indonesia

== See also ==
- Carey (disambiguation)
- Kare (disambiguation)
- Kareh (disambiguation)
- Kary (disambiguation)
