= Majare Karve =

Village in Maharashtra

- Village
- Interactive map of Majare Karve
- Country: India
- State: Maharashtra
- District: Kolhapur

Majare Karve is a small village/hamlet in Chandgad taluka in Kolhapur District of Maharashtra, India. It has own Panchayath with more than 1500 population. Situated on central point From Belguam and District office Chandgad on Belguam-Savantwadi highway. It belongs to Desh or Paschim Maharashtra region. It belongs to Pune Division.

It is located 103 km towards South from District headquarters Kolhapur. 24 km from Chandgad and 444 km from State capital Mumbai. It has Pin code is 416507 and postal head office is Karve.

Gaulwadi (2 km ), Humbarwadi ( 6 km), Dholagarwadi (4 km), Murkutewadi ( 1 km ), Turkewadi (4 km ) are the nearby villages to Karve (majare). Majare Karve is surrounded by Belgaum District towards the East, Ajara Taluka to the North, Gadhinglaj Taluka towards North, Khanapur Taluka towards South.

Belgaum, Sankeshwar, Nipani, Sawantwadi are the nearby cities to Majare Karve.

== Demographics of Majare Karve ==
Marathi is the Local Language.

== Education ==
School and Colleges in Majare Karve

- Mahatma Fule High School Majare Karve
- M. B. Tupare Jr. College Majare Karve
- Kendriya Vidya Mandir Majare

Colleges near Majare Karve

- Y. C. College, Halkarni ( 4 km)
- Saraswati Junior College, Kalkundri (8 km)
- Shri Man V.P. Desai Jr College, Kowad (15 km)
- College Of Arts, Kowad
- ITI College Turkewadi, Patne phata(1 km)

Tourist Places Near By Majare Karve, Kolhapur

- Jagamahatti Dam
- Sundi Fall and Mahipalgadh Fort
- Swapnawel Point
- Amboli Falls
- Prataprav Gujjar Samadhi, Nesari
- Goa
- Sawantwadi
- Sindhudur

Awards -

- Nirmal Gram Award win in 2007.
- Swach Gram Award win on district level with first Rank 2005
