= La Cura (disambiguation) =

"La cura" is a 1996 song by Franco Battiato. La Cura or La cura may also refer to:

- "La Cura", 1985 song by Frankie Ruiz from the album Solista pero no solo
- "La Cura", 2003 song by La Banda Gorda
- La Cura, 2006 album by Thirstin Howl III
- La cura, 2010 compilation album by Franco Battiato
- "La Cura", 2013 song by Dyland & Lenny
- La cura, 2022 film by Francesco Patierno
