= Felix Karrer =

Austrian geologist (1825–1903)

Felix Karrer (March 1825 – 19 April 1903) was an Austrian geologist.

He was born in Venice, educated in Vienna, and served for a time in the war department, but he retired from the public service at the age of thirty-two, and devoted himself to science. He made especial studies of the Tertiary formations and fossils of the Vienna Basin, and investigated the geological relations of the thermal and other springs in that region. He became an authority on the foraminifera, on which subject he published numerous papers. He wrote also a little book entitled Der Boden der Hauptstädte Europas (1881). He died in Vienna.
