= Karel (given name) =

Male given name

- Gender: Male and female

Origin
- Origin: Common Germanic
- Meaning: 'free man'
- Region of origin: Western Europe, Central Europe

Other names
- Nicknames: Karlík, Karlíček, Kája
- Related names: Charles, Carl, Karl, Carol
- Popularity: see popular names

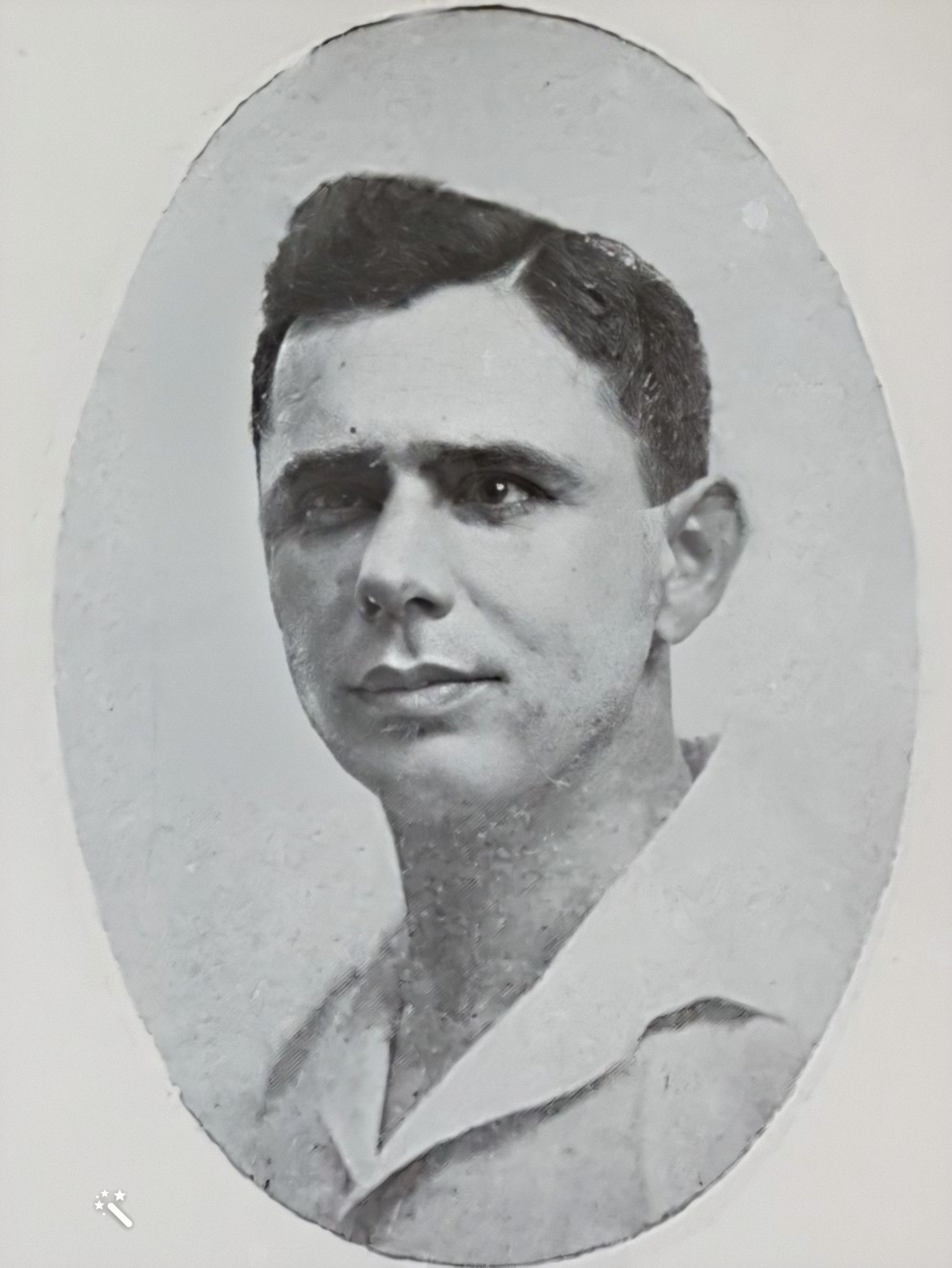
Handzela in 1923

Karel (/ˈkɑːrəl/ KAR-əl) is a masculine given name in Czech, Danish, Dutch, Finnish, Icelandic, Norwegian, Slovene and Swedish. It is a variant of the English and French name Charles, meaning 'free man'.

== Given name ==
The name Karel (and its diminutives, Karlík, Karlíček, and Kája) appears frequently among the Czechs. In 2006, 124,784 Karels lived in the Czech Republic, making the name the thirteenth most popular Czech name. Between 1999 and 2002, the number of Karels in the Czech Republic dropped by 2.7%, and the name dropped out of the twenty most popular newborn child names.

== Notable people with the name ==
- Karel Aalbers (born 1949), Dutch businessman
- Karel Abraham (born 1990), Czech motorcycle racer
- Karel Absolon (1877–1960), Czech geographer
- Karel Josef Adolf (1715–1771), 18th century Czech painter
- Karel Aguilar Chacón (born 1980), Cuban canoeist
- Karel Albert (1901–1987), Belgian composer
- Karel Slavoj Amerling (1807–1884), Czech writer
- Karel Ančerl (1908–1973), Czech conductor
- Karel Anděl (1884–1948), Czech astronomer and selenographer
- Karel Anthierens (1935–2022), Belgian journalist
- Karel Appel (1921–2006), Dutch artist
- Karel Ardelt (1889–1978), Czech tennis player
- Karel Balcar (born 1966), Czech painter
- Karel Bartošek (1930–2004), Czech French historian
- Karel Bártů (1916–2008), Czech modern pentathlete
- Karel Beyers (1943–2020), Belgian footballer
- Karel Bláha (born 1975), Czech sprinter
- Karel Bláha (singer) (1947–2025), Czech opera singer
- Karel Bernard Boedijn (1893–1964), Dutch botanist and mycologist
- Karel Bonsink (born 1950), Dutch footballer and manager
- Karel Boom (1858–1939), Belgian genre painter, watercolorist and art teacher
- Karel Boone (born 1941), Belgian businessman
- Karel Bossart (1904–1975), rocket designer
- Karel Albert Rudolf Bosscha (1865–1928), Dutch philanthropist and planter
- Karel Brančik (1842–1915), Hungarian naturalist
- Karel John van den Brandeler (1888–1948), Dutch modern pentathlete and fencer
- Karel Brandstätter (1915–?), Czech rower
- Karel Hendrik van Brederode (1827–1897), Dutch engineer and architect
- Karel Brückner (born 1939), Czech football coach
- Karel Bulan (born 1940), Czech sport shooter
- Karel Burian (1870–1924), Czech operatic tenor
- Karel Campos (born 2003), Mexican footballer
- Karel Čapek (1890–1938), Czech writer
- Karel Cejp (1900–1979), Czech botanist and mycologist
- Karel Černý, multiple people
- Karel Mark Chichon (born 1971), British orchestra conductor
- Karel Choennie (born 1958), Surinamese Roman Catholic bishop
- Karel Čížek (1892–1948), Czechoslovak rowing coxswain
- Karel Crawford, American politician
- Karel Cudlín (born 1960), Czech photographer
- Karel Čurda (1911–1947), Czech Nazi collaborator
- Karel David (born 1964), Czech long-distance runner
- Karel De Baere (1925–1985), Belgian cyclist
- Karel De Gucht (born 1954), Belgian politician
- Karel De Smet (born 1980), Belgian footballer
- Karel De Vis (born 1937), Belgian water polo player
- Karel deLeeuw (1930–1978), American mathematician
- Karel Demuynck (born 1965), Belgian tennis player
- Karel Dežman (1821–1899), Carniolan politician
- Karel Dillen (1925–2007), Belgian politician
- Karel Diviš (born 1976), Czech entrepreneur
- Karel Dobrý (born 1969), Czech actor
- Karel Domin (1882–1953), Czech botanist and politician
- Karel Doorman (1889–1942), Dutch naval officer
- Karel Dormans (born 1975), Dutch rower
- Karel Duba (1923–1968), Czech musician
- Karel Dujardin (1626–1678), Dutch painter
- Karel van Eerd (1938–2022), Dutch entrepreneur
- Karel Effa (1922–1993), Czech actor
- Karel Engel (1940–2018), Czech wrestler
- Karel Engliš (1880–1961), Czech economist
- Karel Jaromír Erben (1811–1870), Czech poet and folklorist
- Karel Espino (born 2001), Cuban footballer
- Karel Jaromír Erben (1811–1870), Czech folklorist
- Karel Eykman (1936–2022), Dutch writer
- Karel la Fargue (1738–1793), Dutch painter
- Karel Farský (1880-1927), Czech priest and patriarch of the Czechoslovak Hussite Church
- Karel Fiala (1925–2020), Czech actor
- Karel Fialka, Indian-born British singer-songwriter
- Karel Finek (1920–1989), Czech footballer
- Karel Fleischner, Czechoslovak table tennis player
- Karel Fortyn (1930–2001), Czech medical doctor
- Karel Fraeye (born 1977), Belgian football manager
- Karel Frankenstein (1897–1954), Czech sprinter
- Karel Franta (1928–2017), Czech painter and illustrator
- Karel Freja (1877–1937), Czech footballer
- Karel Hendrik Geerts (1807–1885), Belgian sculptor
- Karel Geraerts (born 1982), Belgian football manager
- Karel Gleenewinkel Kamperdijk (1883–1975), Dutch footballer
- Karel Goeyvaerts (1923–1993), Belgian composer
- Karel Goppold (1894–1956), Bohemian fencer
- Karel Gott (1939–2019), Czech singer
- Karel Govaert (1900–1972), Belgian cyclist
- Karel Gut (1927–2014), Czech ice hockey player and coach
- Karel Guzmán (born 1995), Cuban basketball player
- Karel Hájek (1900–1978), Czech photographer
- Karel Halík (1883–?), Czech wrestler
- Karel Halíř (1859–1909), Czech violinist
- Karel Hanika (born 1996), Czech motorcycle racer
- Karel Hardeman (1914–2010), Dutch rower
- Karel Hartmann (1885–1944), Czechoslovak ice hockey player
- Karel Hasil (born 1998), Czech footballer
- Karel Hašler (1879–1941), Czech songwriter and actor
- Karel Havlíček (artist) (1907–1988), Czech painter
- Karel Havlíček (politician) (born 1969), Czech politician
- Karel Havlíček Borovský (1821–1856), Czech writer and journalist
- Karel Havlík (1944–2021), Czech politician
- Karel Heijting (1883–1951), Dutch footballer
- Karel Heřmánek (1947–2024), Czech actor
- Karel Heyne (1877–1947), Dutch botanist
- Karel Hirman (born 1970), Slovak engineer, manager and politician
- Karel Hoffmann (1872–1936), Czech violinist
- Karel Höger (1909–1977), Czech actor
- Karel Holle (1829–1896), Dutch colonial administrator
- Karel Holomek (1937–2023), Czech politician
- Karel Holý (1956–2024), Czech ice hockey player
- Karel Hoplíček (1913–1964), Czech shot putter
- Karel Anton Hošek (1871–1907), Czech adventurer and revolutionary
- Karel Hradil, multiple people
- Karel Hrbáček, mathematician
- Karel Hromádka (1887–1956), Czech chess player
- Karel Hromádka (ice hockey) (1905–1978), Czech ice hockey player
- Karel Hromas (born 1986), Czech ice hockey player
- Karel Hrubeš (born 1993), Czech footballer
- Karel Hrudik, Czechoslovak sprint canoer
- Karel Hruška (1891–1966), Czech opera singer
- Karel van der Hucht (born 1946), Dutch astronomer
- Karel Husa (1921–2016), Czech composer and conductor
- Karel Ferdinand Irmler (1650–?), Czech lawyer and university educator
- Karel Jalovec (1892–?), Czech musicologist
- Karel Janeček (born 1973), Czech mathematician and businessman
- Karel Janák (born 1970), Czech director
- Karel Janež (1914–2006), Slovenian gymnast
- Karel Janoušek (1893–1971), Czechoslovak Air Force officer
- Karel Janovický (1930–2024), Czech composer
- Karel Jarolím (born 1956), Czech footballer
- Karel Jarůšek (born 1952), Czech footballer and manager
- Karel Javůrek (1815–1909), Czech painter
- Karel Jindřichovský (born 1966), Czech handball player
- Karel Jonker (born 1949), Canadian rower
- Karel Kachyňa (1924–2004), Czech film director
- Karel Kaers (1914–1972), Belgian cyclist
- Karel Kalaš (1910–2001), Czech opera singer
- Karel Kaplan (1928–2023), Czech historian
- Karel Karafiát (born 1941), Czech rower
- Karel Kašpar (born 1952), Czechoslovak boxer
- Karel Kaufman (1898–1977), Dutch football manager
- Karel Kavina (1890–1948), Czech botanist, educator and university educator
- Karel Kesselaers (born 1959), Belgian footballer
- Karel Klančnik (1917–2009), Yugoslavian ski jumper
- Karel Klapálek (1893–1984), Czechoslovak legioneer and army general
- Karel Klaver (born 1978), Dutch field hockey player
- Karel Klečka (born 1936), Czech gymnast
- Karel Klíč (1841–1926), Czech artist
- Karel Klostermann (1848–1923), Czech-Austrian writer
- Karel Knejzlík (born 1996), Czech footballer
- Karel Kněnický (1908–1995), Czech sprinter
- Karel Knesl (1942–2020), Czech footballer
- Karel František Koch (1890–1981), known for rescuing Jews in Bratislava during Holocaust
- Karel Kodejška (born 1947), Czech former ski jumper
- Karel Kolář (1955–2017), Czechoslovak runner
- Karel Koldovský (1898–1943), Czech ski jumper
- Karel Kolesa (born 1942), Czech rower
- Karel Kolský (1914–1984), Czech footballer and manager
- Karel Komárek (born 1969), Czech businessman
- Karel Komzák, multiple people
- Karel Konrád (1899–1971), Czech writer and journalist
- Karel Kopp (1903–1956), Czech architect
- Karel Blažej Kopřiva (1766–1785), Czech organist and composer
- Karel Kovář, multiple people
- Karel Kovařovic (1862–1920), Czech composer and conductor
- Karel Koželuh (1895–1950), Czech sportsperson
- Karel Kožíšek (born 1977), Czech canoeist
- Karel Kramář (1860–1937), Czech politician
- Karel Kratochvíl (born 1982), Czech footballer
- Karel Kratz (1893–1962), Dutch water polo player
- Karel Krautgartner (1922–1982), Czech musical artist
- Karel Krejčí (born 1968), Czech footballer and manager
- Karel Kroupa (born 1950), Czech footballer
- Karel Kroupa Jr. (born 1980), Czech footballer
- Karel Kryl (1944–1994), Czechoslovak poet, singer and songwriter
- Karel Kubát (born 1988), Czech ice hockey player
- Karel Kubeška (born 1955), Czech curler and curling coach
- Karel Kuhn (1915–?), Czech basketball player
- Karel Kuklík (1937–2019), Czech photographer
- Karel Kula (born 1963), Czech footballer
- Karel Kuthan (1900–1962), Czech architect
- Karel Kváček (1912–1986), Czech wrestler
- Karel Lamač (1897–1952), Czech film director
- Karel Lambert, American philosopher and logician
- Karel Lang (born 1958), Czech ice hockey player
- Karel Lavický (born 1985), Czech windsurfer
- Karel Lavrič (1818–1876), Carniolan politician
- Karel Lavrih (1915–1998), Yugoslav cyclist
- Karel Lodewijk Ledeganck (1805–1847), Flemish writer
- Karel Leština (born 1973), Czech sprint canoer
- Karel Lidický (1900–1976), Czech sculptor
- Karel Linz (born 1986), Czech volleyball player
- Karel Lismont (born 1949), Belgian long-distance runner
- Karel Loprais (1949–2021), Czech rally raid driver
- Karel Hynek Mácha (1810–1836), Czech poet
- Karel Mallants (born 1935), Belgian footballer
- Karel van Mallery (1571–1635), Flemish engraver
- Karel van Mander (1548–1606), Flemish painter, poet and art historian
- Karel van Mander III (1609–1670), Dutch painter
- Karel van Mander the Younger (1579–1623), Dutch Golden Age painter
- Karel Marquez (born 1982), Filipino entertainer
- Karel Martens (born 1939), Dutch graphic designer
- Karel Masopust (1942–2019), Czechoslovak ice hockey player
- Karel Matoušek (1928–2018), Czech wrestler
- Karel Mauser (1918–1977), Slovene poet, author and playwright
- Karel Meijer (1884–1967), Dutch water polo player
- Karel Mejta, multiple people
- Karel Meulemans (born 1934), Belgian pigeon fancier
- Karel Michal (1932–1984), Czech writer
- Karel Michlowsky (1918–1998), Czech footballer and manager
- Karel Miljon (1903–1984), Dutch boxer
- Karel Minnie (born 1954), South African politician
- Karel Miry (1823–1889), Belgian composer
- Karel Mustmaa (born 2005), Estonian professional footballer
- Karel Navrátil (1867–1936), Czech violinist and composer
- Karel Ndjoba (1961–2014), Namibian military officer
- Karel Nedobitý (1905–1986), Czech long-distance runner
- Karel Nedvěd (1850–?), Czech runner
- Karel Neffe (1948–2020), Czech rower
- Karel Neffe Jr. (born 1985), Czech rower
- Karel Nepomucký (born 1939), Czech footballer
- Karel de Nerée tot Babberich (1880–1909), Dutch painter
- Karel Nesl (1930–2009), Czech cyclist
- Karel Niessen (1895–1967), Dutch physicist
- Karel Nováček (born 1965), Czech tennis player
- Karel Novák, Czechoslovak canoeist
- Karel Novy, multiple people
- Karel Ondříček (1863–1943), Czech violinist
- Karel Oomen (1932–2022), Belgian wrestler
- Karel Ooms (1845–1900), Belgian painter
- Karel Otáhal (1901–1972), Czech sculptor
- Karel Otčenášek (1920–2011), Czech Roman Catholic bishop
- Karel Eduard Paar (born 1934), Czech Knight of Justice
- Karel Paar (born 1945), Czech cyclist
- Karel Pacák (1896–?), Czech long-distance runner
- Karel Pacner (1936–2021), Czech publicist
- Karel Pařík (1857–1942), Czech-born Bosnian architect
- Karel Paulus (1933–2003), Czech volleyball player
- Karel Pauzer (born 1936), Czech graphic, sculptor and artist
- Karel Pechan (1901–?), Czech cyclist
- Karel Pekelharing (1909–1944), Dutch dancer, choreographer and resistance member
- Karel Pešek (1895–1970), Czech footballer and ice hockey player
- Karel Pešek (motorcyclist) (born 1992), Czech motorcycle racer
- Karel Petr (1868–1950), Czech mathematician
- Karel Petrů (1891–1949), Czech football manager
- Karel Pexidr (born 1929), Czechoslovak composer
- Karel Pilař (born 1977), Czech ice hockey player
- Karel Piták (born 1980), Czech footballer
- Karel Plášek (born 1973), Czech professional ice hockey player
- Karel Plicka (1894–1987), Czechoslovak photographer, director, cinematographer, folklorist and pedagogue
- Karel Plíhal (born 1958), Czech musician
- Karel van der Pluym (1625–1672), Dutch painter
- Karel Poborský (born 1972), Czech footballer
- Karel Podhajský (born 1973), Czech footballer
- Karel Poláček (1892–1945), Czech writer, humorist and journalist
- Karel Poma (1920–2014), Belgian politician
- Karel Potgieter (born 1975), South African shot putter
- Karel Pott (1904–1953), Portuguese sprinter
- Karel Prager (1923–2001), Czech architect
- Karel Přibyl (1899–1968), Czech sprinter
- Karel Prohl (born 1947), Czech weightlifter
- Karel Purkyně (1834–1868), Austro-Hungarian painter
- Karel Rachůnek (1979–2011), Czech ice hockey player
- Karel Rada (born 1971), Czech footballer
- Karel Raška (1909–1987), Czech medical doctor and epidemiologist
- Karel Reiner (1910–1979), Czech composer and pianist
- Karel Reisz (1926–2002), Czech-born British filmmaker
- Karel Řepa (1895–1963), Czech architect
- Karel Robětín (1889–1941), Czech tennis player
- Karel Roden (born 1962), Czech actor
- Karel Rottiers (1953–2024), Belgian cyclist
- Karel Rüütli (born 1978), Estonian politician
- Karel Růžička (1909–?), Czechoslovak bobsledder
- Karel Růžička (pianist) (1940–2016), Czech jazz pianist, composer and music teacher
- Karel Rychlík (1885–1968), Czech mathematician
- Karel Sabbe, Belgian ultra runner
- Karel Sabina (1813–1877), Czech writer and journalist
- Karel Pravoslav Sádlo (1898–1971), Czech cellist
- Karel Saitl (1924–2020), Czech weightlifter
- Karel San Juan (born 1965), Jesuit Filipino priest from Marikina, Philippines
- Karel Satsuit Tubun (1928–1965), police officer and National Hero of Indonesia
- Karel Scheder (born 1950), Czechoslovak sprint canoer
- Karel Schmuck (1913–?), Czech water polo player
- Karel Schoeman (1939–2017), South African writer
- Karel Schummelketel (1897–1981), Dutch equestrian
- Karel Schwarzenberg (1937–2023), Czech politician
- Karel Šebor (1843–1903), Czech composer
- Karel Sedláček (born 1979), Czech darts player
- Karel Senecký (1919–1979), Czech footballer
- Karel Sesa (1954–2015), Indonesian academic
- Karel Shook (1920–1985), American ballet master, choreographer and writer
- Karel Šiktanc (1928–2021), Czech poet and children’s writer
- Karel Škréta (1610–1674), Czech painter
- Karel Slabbaert (1618–1654), Dutch painter and draftsman
- Karel Sládeček (born 1963), Czech politician
- Karel Sladkovský (1823–1880), Czech journalist, writer and politician
- Karel Slavíček (1678–1735), Czech scientist and missionary to China
- Karel Smyczek (born 1950), Czech actor and director
- Karel Snoeckx (born 1973), Belgian footballer
- Karel Soucek (1947–1985), Canadian stuntman
- Karel Sperber (1910–1957), surgeon imprisoned in Auschwitz
- Karel Philips Spierincks (1609–1639), Flemish painter
- Karel Špillar (1871–1939), Czech painter and graphic artist
- Karel Štark (born 1942), Czech cyclist
- Karel Starý (c. 1885–1918), Bohemian gymnast
- Karel Štěch (1908–1982), Czech landscape painter, graphic designer, woodcutter and illustrator
- Karel van Steenhoven (born 1958), Dutch recorder player and composer
- Karel Štefl (born 1982), Czech pair skater
- Karel Štefl (cross-country skier) (1946–2017), Czech cross-country skier
- Karel Steiner (1895–1934), Czechoslovak footballer
- Karel Steklý (1903–1987), Czech film director
- Karel Štěpánek (1899–1980), Czech actor
- Karel Stibor (1923–1948), Czechoslovak ice hockey player
- Karel Štogl (1973–2021), Czech lawyer
- Karel Struijs (1892–1974), Dutch water polo player
- Karel Šula (born 1959), Slovak shot putter
- Karel Svoboda, multiple people
- Karel Svolinský (1896–1986), Czech painter, graphic artist, illustrator and university professor
- Karel Sys (1914–1990), Belgian boxer
- Karel Tammjärv (born 1989), Estonian cross-country skier
- Karel Teige (1900–1951), Czech artist
- Karel Thijs (1918–1990), Belgian cyclist
- Karel Thole (1914–2000), Dutch painter
- Karel Tichota (born 1975), Czech footballer
- Karel Tilga (born 1998), Estonian athlete
- Karel Toman (1877–1946), Czech poet
- Karel van der Toorn (born 1956), Dutch scholar of ancient religions
- Karel Traxler (1866–1936), Czech chess player
- Karel Treybal (1885–1941), Czech chess player
- Karel Tuns (1906–?), Belgian boxer
- Karel Uher (born 1983), Czech male curler
- Karel Urbánek (born 1941), Czech politician
- Karel Urbánek (footballer) (1972–2007), Czech footballer
- Karel Uyttersprot (born 1949), Belgian politician
- Karel Vacek (born 2000), Czech cyclist
- Karel Vácha (born 1970), Czech former football player
- Karel Vachek (1940–2020), Czech director
- Karel Van Hassel (1904–1989), Belgian cyclist
- Karel Van Miert (1942–2009), Flemish socialist politician
- Karel Van Roose (born 1990), Belgian footballer
- Karel Večeřa (born 1955), Czech football manager
- Karel Vejmelka (born 1996), Czech ice hockey player
- Karel Velebný (1931–1989), Czech musician
- Karel Verbist (1883–1909), Belgian cyclist
- Karel Vinck (born 1938), Belgian businessman
- Karel Vohralík (1945–1998), Czech ice hockey player
- Karel Voolaid (born 1977), Estonian football player and manager
- Karel Voous (1920–2002), Dutch ornithologist
- Karel Vosátka (1929–2022), Czechoslovak figure skater
- Karel Wälzer (1888–1948), Czechoslovak ice hockey player
- Karel van der Weide (born 1973), Dutch chess grandmaster
- Karel Weis (1862–1944), Czech composer
- Karel Frederik Wenckebach (1864–1940), Dutch cardiologist
- Karel Willemen (born 1967), Dutch designer
- Karel Wiesner (1919–1986), Canadian chemist
- Karel van de Woestijne (1878–1929), Flemish writer
- Karel van Wolferen (born 1941), Dutch journalist, writer and professor
- Karel Zahradnik (1848–1916), Czech mathematician
- Karel Zelenka (born 1983), Czech-Italian figure skater
- Karel Zeman (1910–1989), Czech filmmaker
- Karel Zich (1949–2004), Czech composer, guitarist and singer
- Karel Elodie Ziketh (born 1991), Ivorian hurdler
- Karel Zlín (born 1937), Czech painter, sculptor and poet
- Karel Zvonař (1912–1994), Czech wrestler

== See also ==
- Karell Émard (born 1988), Canadian ice hockey player
- Karell Peña (born 1989), Cuban beach volleyball player
- Karrell Fox (1928–1998), American magician
- Karey (disambiguation)
- Kariel
- Karol (name)
- Karyl
