= Karel =

Karel may refer to:

== People ==
- Karel (given name)
- Karel (surname)
- Charles Karel Bouley (born 1962), American talk radio personality known on air as Karel
- Christiaan Karel Appel (1921–2006), Dutch painter and sculptor

== Business ==
- Karel Electronics, a Turkish electronics manufacturer
- Grand Hotel Karel V, Dutch Hotel
- Restaurant Karel 5, Dutch restaurant

== Other ==
- 1682 Karel, an asteroid
- Karel (programming language), an educational programming language
- Karel the Dog, a fictional dog made by the company CodeHS

== See also ==
- Karelians or Karels, a Baltic-Finnic ethnic group
- Karel and I, 1942 Czech film
- Karey (disambiguation)
