= Pekelharing =

Pekelharing is a surname of Dutch origin. People with the surname include:

- Arnoldo Pekelharing (1936–2001), Argentine sailor
- Cornelis Adrianus Pekelharing (1848–1922), Dutch physiologist
- Karel Pekelharing (1909–1944), Dutch dancer
