= Kariel =

Kariel is a given name and a surname. Notable people known by this name include the following:

== Given name ==
- Kariel Gardosh, known by his nickname Dosh, (1921 – 2000), Israeli cartoonist and illustrator

== Surname ==
- Henry Kariel (1924 – 2004), American political scientist and author

== See also ==
- Karel (given name)
- Karel (surname)
- Karie (name)
- Kartel (disambiguation)
- Kriel (disambiguation)

}
