= Paul Beumer =

Dutch artist

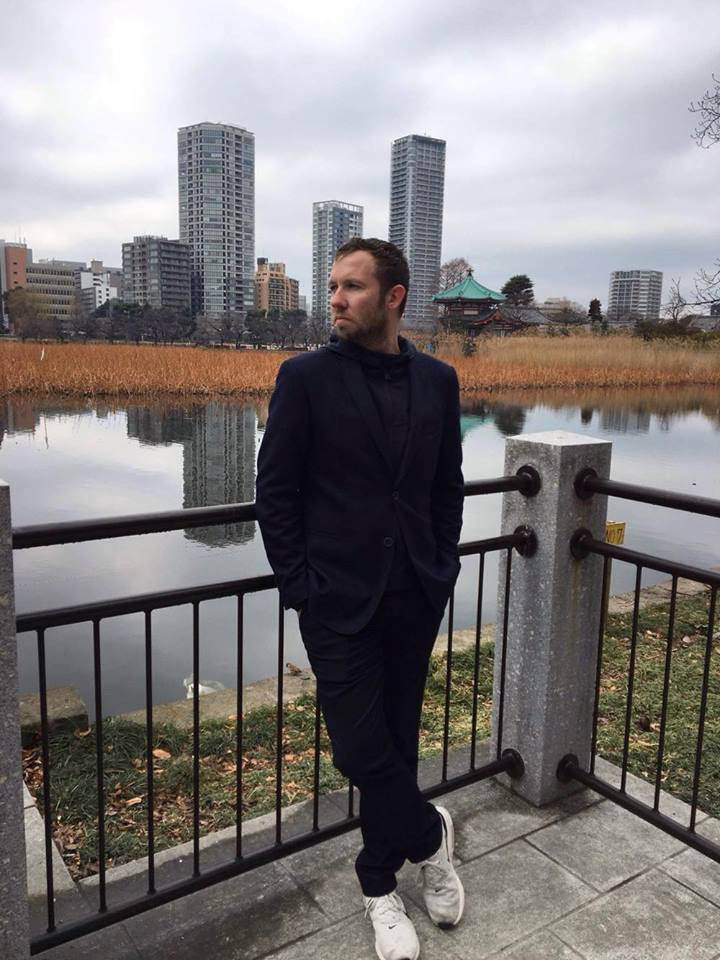
- Paul Beumer in Tokyo, 2018
- Born: May 9, 1982 (age 43); Amersfoort, Netherlands
- Education: Royal Academy of Art, The Hague (BFA); Rijksakademie van beeldende kunsten (Residency)
- Known for: Painter
- Notable work: The message of the flower is the flower (2017); In the shade of the elms and willows, my friends drink until they are inspired (2016); I won't have the luxury of seeing scenes like this much longer (2015); Tomorrow's Harvest (2015)
- Awards: Royal Award for Contemporary Painting, 2009 (Nominee)

Paul Beumer (born May 9, 1982) is a Dutch artist. His non-traditional artistic process includes manual resist-dyeing techniques to create abstract patterns which are described as a reminiscent of "Western High Modernism in that they allow for doubt, failure and chance." Beumer, himself, describes his works as “humble and simple in its forms.” He is presently a resident at 16/16 in Lagos, Nigeria and Schoolhouse in Mutianyu, China.

== Education ==
Beumer received his BFA from the Royal Academy of Art in The Hague and completed a two-year residency at the Rijksakademie van beeldende kunsten in Amsterdam.

== Selected works ==
Beumer's work has been featured in exhibitions at numerous galleries and institutions around the world including:

- ARCO Madrid (2019) – Dürst Britt & Mayhew, Madrid, Spain
- He wanted kisses, but all he got was analytical anecdotes and philosophic epigrams (2018) - Taipei, Taiwan
- The message of the flower is the flower (2017) – Dürst Britt & Mayhew, The Hague, Netherlands
- Liquid Mountain (2016) – Museum Het Valkhof, Nijmegen, Netherlands
- Paint Wide Mouth White (2016) – Qingyun International Art Centre, Beijing, China
- Mister Motley Salon (2016) – Mister Motley, Online
- In the shade of the elms and willows, my friends drink until they are inspired (2016) – Goethe Pavillon, Palais Schardt, Germany
- Amsterdam Art Fair (2016) – Dürst Britt & Mayhew, Amsterdam, Netherlands
- Dry Landscape (2015) – Chinese European Art Center (CEAC), Xiamen, China
- Sigh, The Others (2015) – Ex Carcere Le Nuove, Turin, Italy
- I won’t have the luxury of seeing scenes like this much longer (2015) – Dürst Britt & Mayhew, The Hague, Netherlands
- Tomorrow’s Harvest (2015) – Bosse & Baum, London, United Kingdom
- Paul Beumer & Tim Breukers (2012) – Walden Affairs, The Hague, Netherlands
- Watching the Third World Slide By Through the Prism of a Champagne Glass (2011) – Galerie De Expeditie, Amsterdam, Netherlands
- The Empire on which the Sun Never Sets (2010) – Wetering Galerie, Amsterdam, Netherlands

== Selected grants and awards ==
Beumer has been honoured for his work across his career including:

- PRO Research Grant (2016) – Stroom, The Hague, Netherlands
- Stipend for Depth Development Artistic Practice (2015) – Mondriaan Fund, Amsterdam, Netherlands
- Grant for Post-academic Development Artistic Practice (2013) – Culture Fund Grant Mondriaan Fund, Amsterdam, Netherlands
- Prince Bernhard Culture Fund (2013) – Amsterdam, Netherlands
- Nomination, De Scheffer (2013) – Dordrecht, Netherlands
- Stipend Program for Emerging Artists (2012) – Mondriaan Fund, Amsterdam, Netherlands
- Nomination, Royal Award for Contemporary Painting (2009) – Amsterdam, Netherlands
- Nomination, Start Point Prize, Galerie Klatovy / Klenová (2009) – Janovice nad Úhlavou, Czech Republic
