= Karel (surname) =

Karel is a surname that is derived from the given names Carl and Karl. Notable people with the surname include:

== Surname ==
- Eva Karel (fl. mid 1960s – 1970s), Swiss slalom canoeist
- Frank Karel (1935–2009), American health advocate
- Jan Karel (fl. 1970s), Austrian-Swiss slalom canoeist
- John C. Karel (1873–1938), American politician
- Jozef Karel (1922–2005), Slovak football player and coach
- L. Albert Karel (1875–1965), American politician
- Marian Karel (born 1944), Czech sculptor
- Rudolf Karel (1880–1945), Czech composer
- William Karel (born 1940), French film director and author

== See also ==
- Karel (disambiguation)
- Karel (given name)
- Kariel
- Michael J. Karels
