= Karel Kuklík =

Czech photographer (1937–2019)

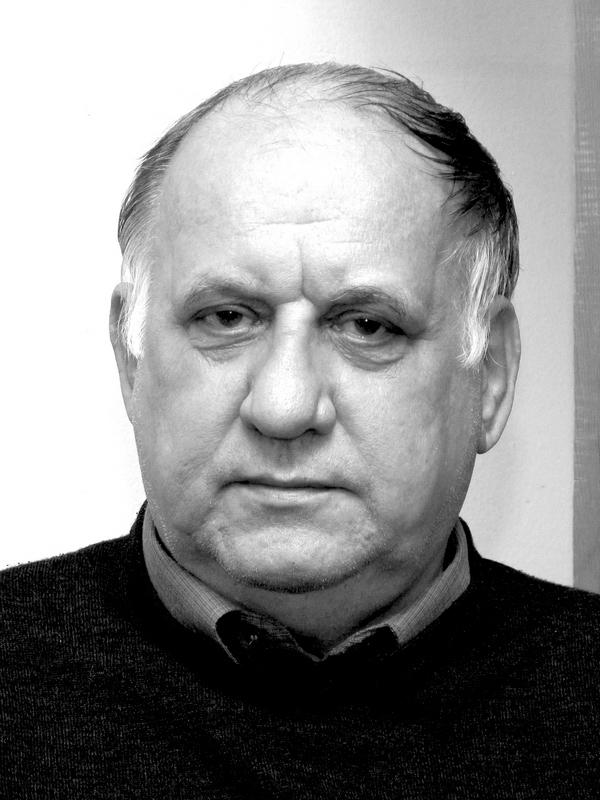
- Karel Kuklík; Photo by: Jaroslav Beneš
- Born: March 7, 1937; Prague, Czechoslovakia
- Died: August 18, 2019 (aged 82); Prague, Czech Republic
- Occupation: Photographer
- Known for: Photographic series: Imaginative Landscapes (1958–1964), The Šumava, Prague

Karel Kuklík (March 7, 1937, Prague, Czechoslovakia – August 18, 2019, Prague) was a Czech photographer and one of the representatives of Informel in Czech fine art photography. He was classified as an artist influenced by abstract and surrealist tendencies and as an artist who creates works with a strong existentialist atmosphere. In 2000 he co-founded the photographic group Český dřevák.

== Life ==
Karel Kuklík was born in Prague. His father was a tailor, who was imprisoned for illegal activity during World War II. Young Karel spent part of the early 1940s with his relatives in a few places, for example in a village near Blaník Hill. When he was about six he befriended František Šmejkal, who was the same age as him and who later became a notable art theoretician. At the age of fifteen Kuklík acquired his first camera (6x6 cm) and a year later he bought a 6x9 cm plate camera. It was also at that time that he became seriously interested in fine art and started visiting galleries. In the first half of the 1950s he saw an exhibition of paintings by Jan Zrzavý, which made a great impression on him.

Between 1952 and 1954 he trained to be a car mechanic, which was what he did from 1954 to 1956 and from 1958 to 1960. Between 1956 and 1958 he did his military service. In 1960 he became a photo laboratory assistant at the State Institute for Historical Monuments Preservation and Environmental Protection in Prague. It was there that he acquired many useful photographic and darkroom skills. Since 1964 he has been a freelance photographer.

Karel Kuklík died after a long illness on Sunday August 18, 2019.

== Work ==
=== Photographic series ===
==== Imaginative landscapes ====
Imaginative Landscapes is a general series created between 1958 and 1964. It includes the following individual series of photographs:

- 1958–1960 Tainted Landscape I
- 1960–1963 Landscape of Hope
- 1962–1964 Tainted Landscape II
- 1964 Landscape of Cognition
- 1964 Wreckage

==== Other photographic series ====
- 1958–1961 Dead Town
- 1959–1967 Structures
- 1959–1970 Shadows
- 1960–1965 Wood
- 1960–1967 Landscape with Stones
- 1961 Road (triptych)
- 1961–1962 Town
- 1962 Waiting (triptych)
- 1962 Peace Be with the One Who Comes (triptych)
- 1961–1968 Objects I (triptych)
- 1963 Victory (triptych)
- 1963 Rest in Peace (triptych)
- 1963–1964 Town II
- 1963–1964 Time of the Town
- 1965 Graveyard (pentaptych)
- 1965 Machine I
- 1967 Machine II
- 1966–1967 Objects II
- 1966–1967 Rocks
- 1968 Quarry I
- 1970 Quarry II
- 1970 Shore
- 1970 Trees Grow Straight I a II (triptych)
- 1970 Landscape of Returns (with snow)
- 1971–1991 Landscape of Returns I
- 1973–1994 Landscape of Returns II
- 1974 Grébovka
- 1976–1979 Homestead
- 1981 There and Back
- 1985–1992 Traces and Projections
- 1991 Čakov, House no. 18
- 1991 Female Neighbours
- 1991 Leaves
- since 1997 Prague

== Included in collections ==
- Uměleckoprůmyslové museum v Praze (Museum of Decorative Arts in Prague)
- Národní galerie v Praze (National Gallery in Prague)
- Moravská galerie v Brně (Moravian Gallery in Brno)
- Muzeum Šumavy Kašperské Hory (The Museum of the Šumava in Kašperské Hory)
- Alšova jihočeská galerie v Hluboké nad Vltavou (Aleš South-Bohemian Gallery in Hluboká nad Vltavou)
- Galerie hlavního města Prahy (City Gallery Prague)
- The Museum of Modern Art in New York City
- Bibliothèque nationale de France (French National Library)
- The Museum of Fine Arts, Houston, United States
- Národní muzeum fotografie v Jindřichově Hradci (National Museum of Photography in Jindřichův Hradec)

== Books ==
- Šumava (The Šumava), Panorama 1984

Honourable mention for photographs in The Most Beautiful Book of the Year 1984 competition organized by the Ministry of Culture of the Czech Socialist Republic and the Museum of Czech Literature; Annual Award of the Panorama Publishing House for 1984

- České a moravské rybníky (Bohemian and Moravian Ponds), Pressfoto 1984
- Český kras (Bohemian Karst), Pressfoto 1988
- Český Krumlov (with Pavel Kuklík), Pressfoto 1992
- Šumava (The Šumava), KUKLIK 1993
- Český Krumlov (with Pavel Kuklík), KUKLIK 1996

Awarded as The Photographic Publication of the Year 1997

- Monografie Karel Kuklík (Monograph of Karel Kuklík), České muzeum výtvarných umění (Czech Museum of Fine Arts), 1997 A

Awarded as The Photographic Publication of the Year 1998

- Praha 1997–1998 Katalog grantu Hlavního města Prahy 1998 (Catalogue of Grant by Capital Prague 1998)

Awarded as The Photographic Catalogue of the Year 1999

- Krajiny návratů (Landscapes of Returns), KUKLIK 2004
- Praha – Krajina návratů 1974–2008 (Prague – Landscape of Returns 1974–2008), KUKLIK 2010

== Portfolios ==
- Dvůr 1976–1978 (Homestead 1976–1978)

Ten original 18x24 contact prints. Ten numbered copies published by the author in 1979, with accompanying text by Karel Dvořák.

- Krajina návratů II. 1973–1980 (Landscape of Returns II 1973–1980)

Ten original 18x24 contact prints. Ten numbered copies published by the author in 1981, with accompanying text by Anna Fárová.

- Grébovka 1974

Ten original 13x18 contact prints. Ten numbered copies published by the author in 1993, with accompanying text by Jan Kříž.

- Šumava – variace na téma (The Šumava – Variations on a Theme)

Seven original 15x20 enlargements. Ten numbered copies published by the author in 1995, with accompanying text by Daniela Mrázková.

== Gallery ==
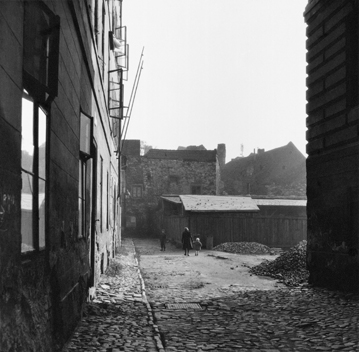
Untitled, 1955

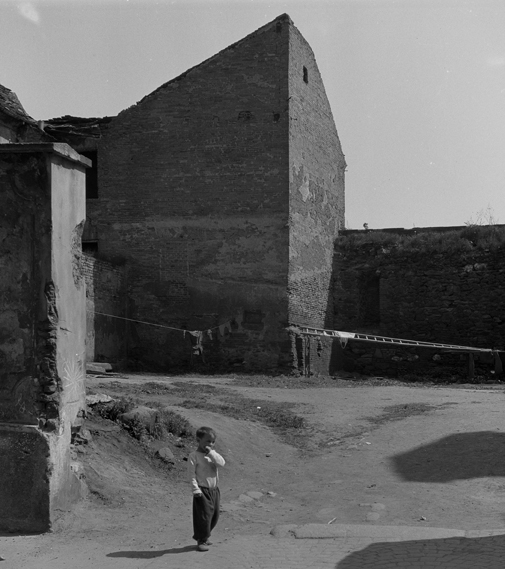
From the Dead Town series, 1959

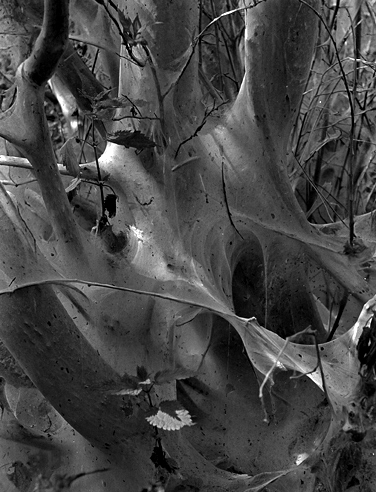
From the Tainted Landscape I series, 1959

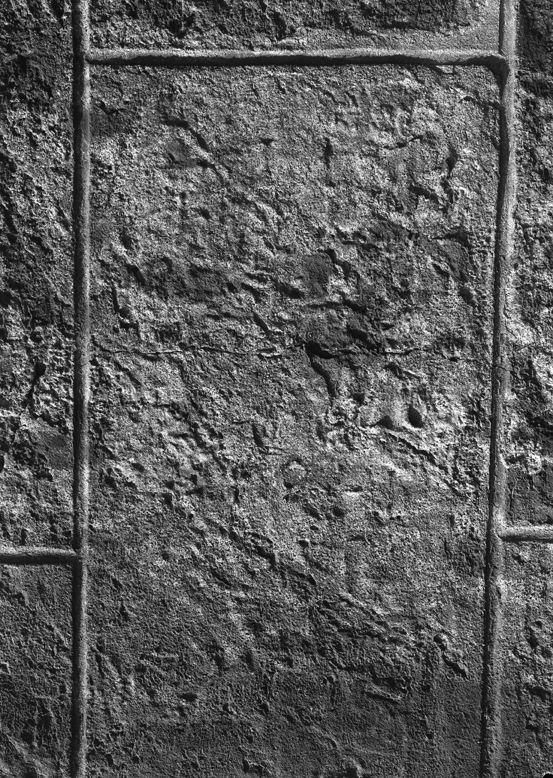
Structure no. 3, 1960

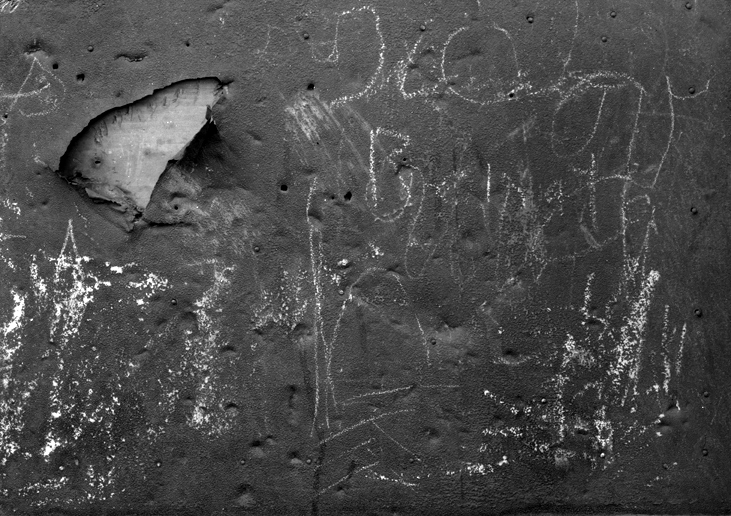
Crack II, 1962

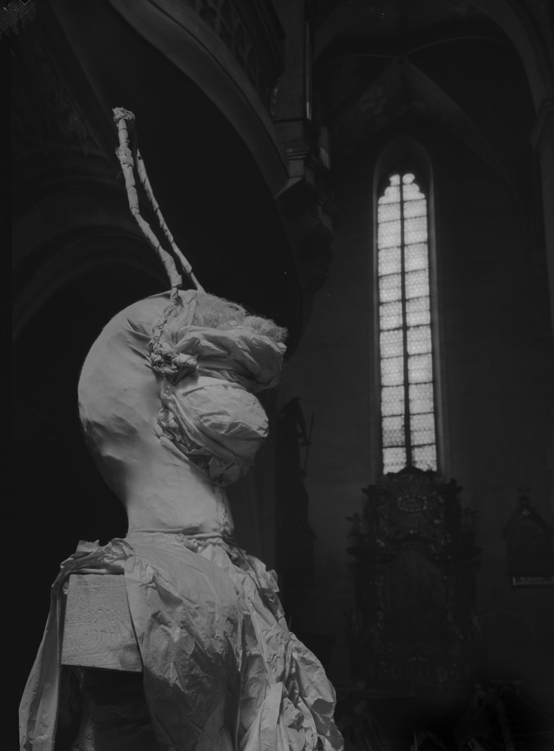
Waiting triptych - Left Wing, 1962

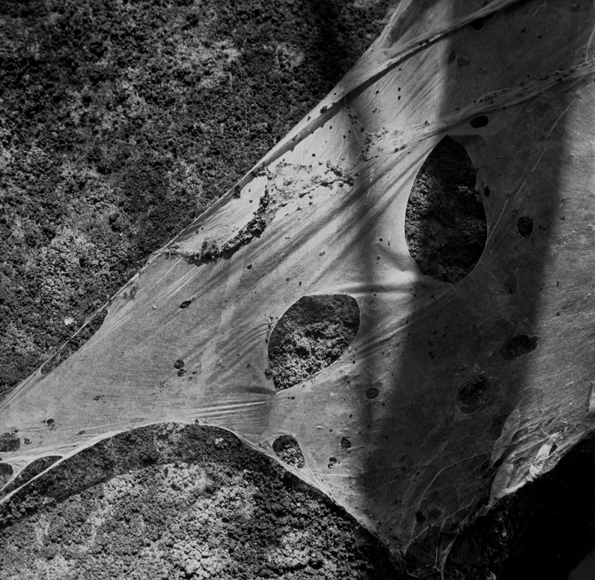
From the Tainted Landscape II series, 1964

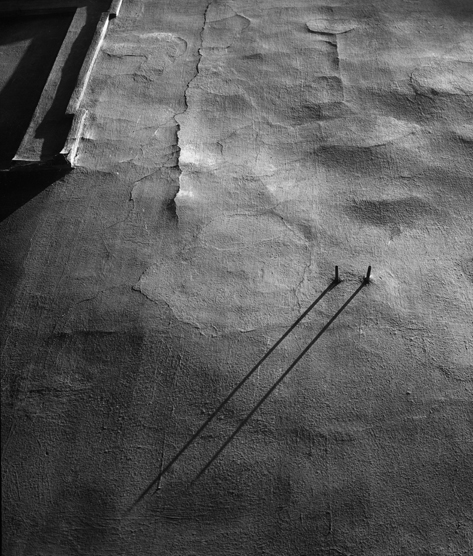
From the Time of the Town series, 1964

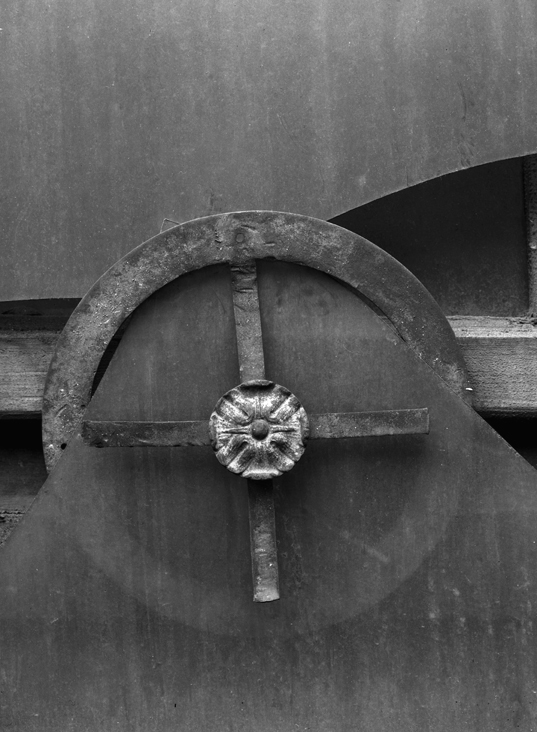
From the Objects I series, 1967

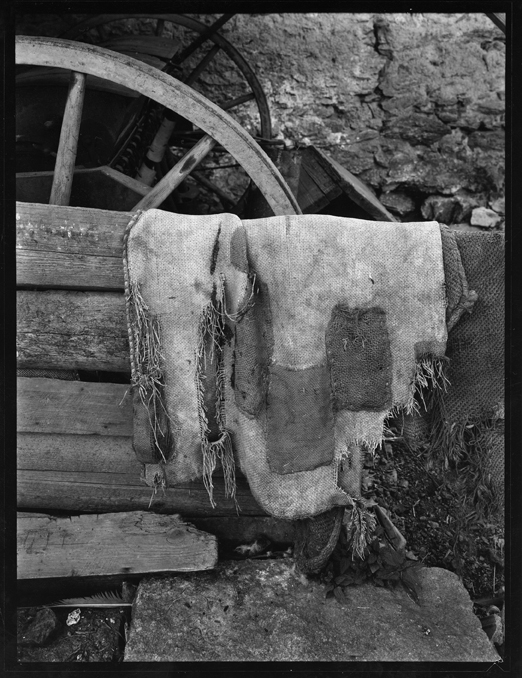
From the Homestead I series, 1976

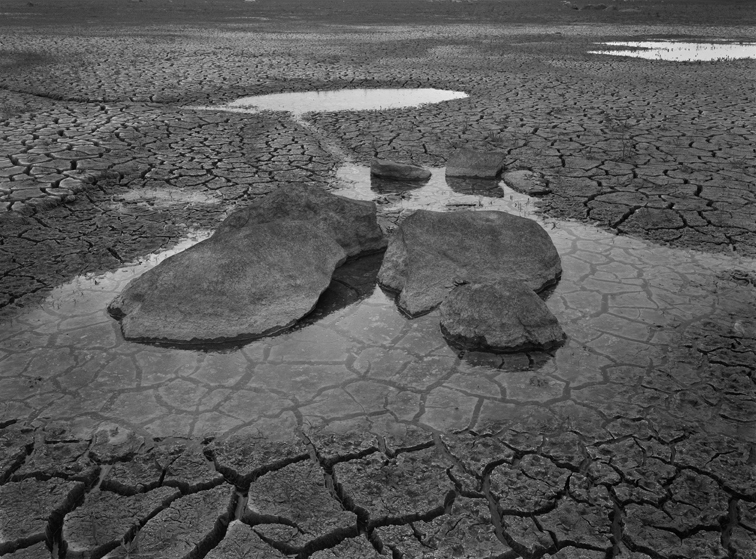
From the Landscape of Returns II series, 1980

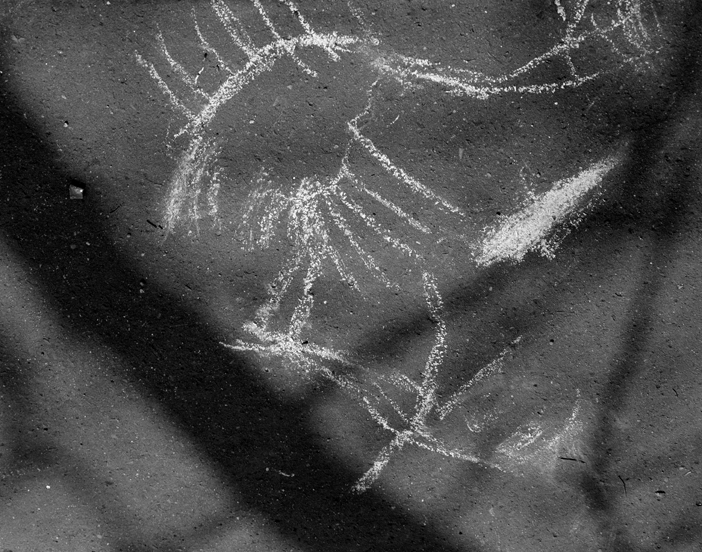
From the Traces and Projections series, 1985

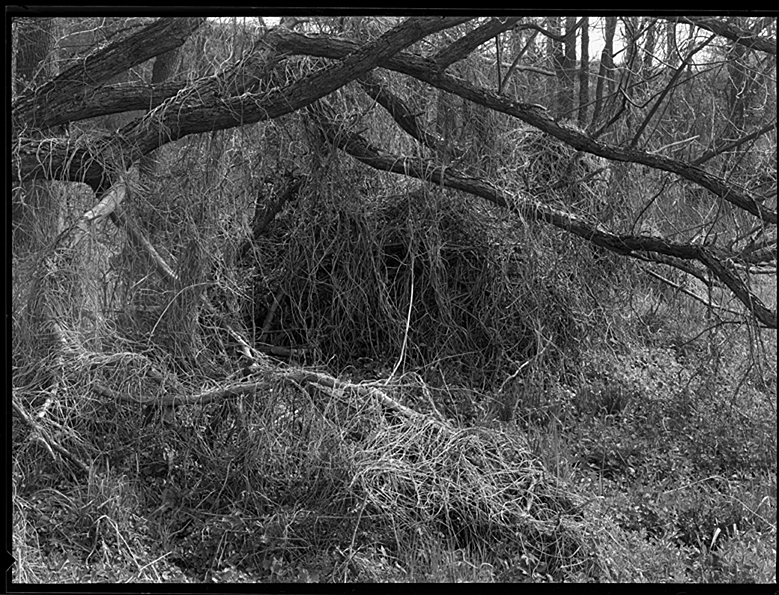
From the Landscape of Returns II series, 1993-1994
