= Kriel =

Kriel is an Afrikaans surname. Notable people with the surname include:

- Anneline Kriel, South African model and actress
- Ashley Kriel (1966–1987), South African activist
- Hernus Kriel (1941–2015), first Premier of the Western Cape province
- James Kriel, (1942–2016) former South African Air Force Chief
- Jesse Kriel (born 1994), South African rugby player
- Marianne Kriel (born 1971), former backstroke and freestyle swimmer from South Africa
- Deejay Kriel (born 1995), South African professional boxer

== See also ==
- Kariel
- Kriel, Mpumalanga, South Africa
