= Český dřevák =

Czech photography collective

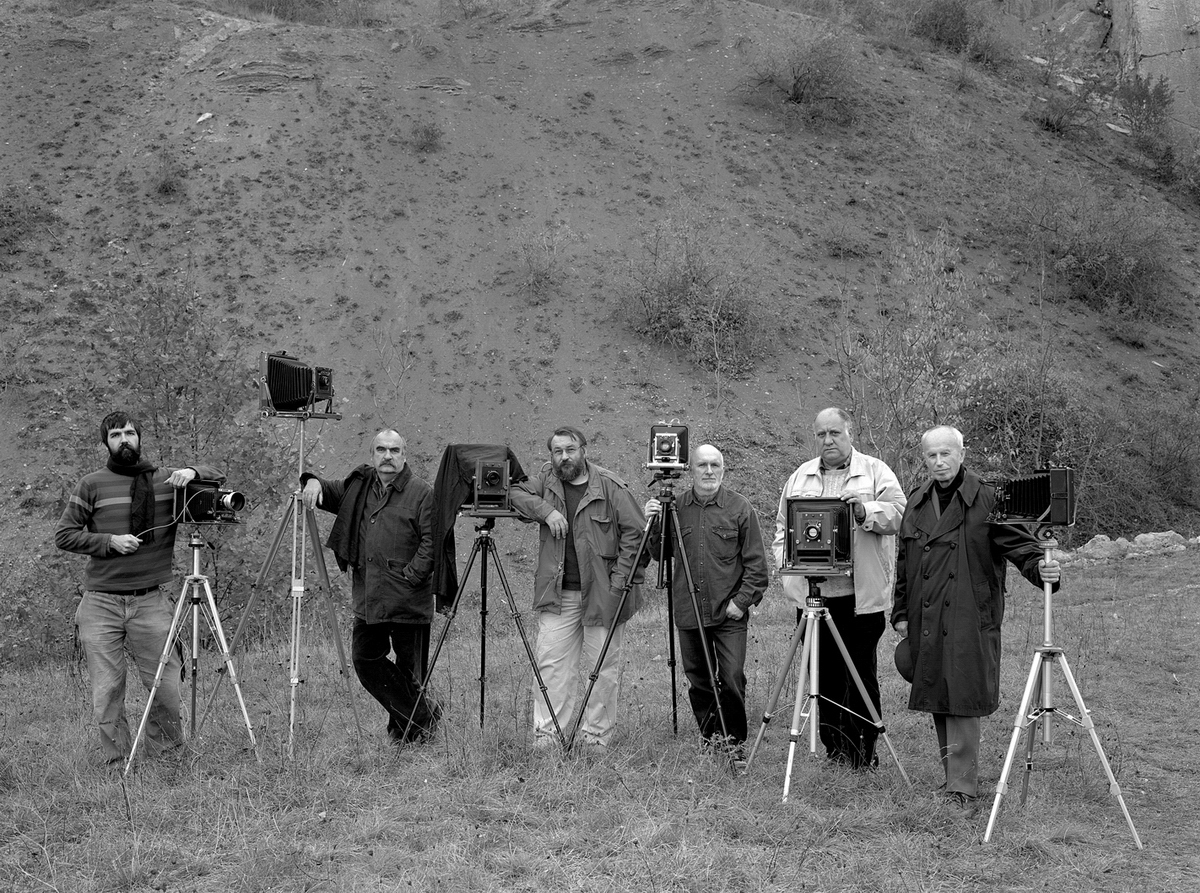
Český dřevák members (left to right): Tomáš Rasl, Jan Reich, Bohumír Prokůpek, Jaroslav Beneš, Karel Kuklík, Petr Helbich) in Prokopské údolí, Prague, on 20 October 2004. Photo by:Tomáš Rasl

Český dřevák was a group of Czech photographers in 2000–2008. Its members were not connected by a common manifesto, but by the technical way of creating photographs. All of them worked with wooden large-format cameras (using negative formats such as 13 × 18 – 24 × 30 cm) and their resulting photographs were usually contact prints.

== History ==
The group was founded by photographers Karel Kuklík, Jan Reich, Jaroslav Beneš and Bohumír Prokůpek in 2000. In 2002 they were joined by Tomáš Rasl and in 2003 by Petr Helbich. This is how Bohumír Prokůpek summed up the reason why these artists formed the group: "We used to meet to discuss films, photographic paper, the landscape, exhibitions, politics, girls, and life's little adventures, and because of good wine, which can make existence even more wonderful (...) What brings us together is our delight in the craft, our leisurely approach, the wonderful finality of the contact print..." After the deaths of Bohumír Prokůpek and Jan Reich in 2008 and 2009, respectively, the group was dissolved even though its surviving members still occasionally exhibit their works collectively under the name of Český dřevák.

== The name "Český dřevák" ==
The expression "Český dřevák" has multiple meanings and is an intended pun. "Český" means simply "Czech", but "dřevák" in Czech is usually 1) a clog (a wooden shoe) or 2) slang for a clumsy person. In the name of this group it also refers to its members' practice of using wooden cameras. These photographers also had wooden "membership cards", which looked like a large format film holder.

== Exhibitions ==
- 2000 Praha bez věží (Prague without Towers), Malá galerie České spořitelny in Kladno, (Kuklík, Reich, Beneš)
- 2001 Český dřevák, Galerie 4, Cheb (Kuklík, Reich, Beneš, Prokůpek)
- 2001 Krajina intimní prostor (The Landscape as Intimate Space), Prague House of Photography, (Kuklík, Prokůpek)
- 2002 Český dřevák, Lidové sady in Liberec – small exhibition hall, (Kuklík, Reich, Beneš, Prokůpek, Rasl)
- 2003 Český dřevák, Jihomoravské muzeum (South Moravian Museum) in Znojmo, (Helbich, Kuklík, Reich, Beneš, Prokůpek, Rasl)
- 2003 participation in the Paris Photo art fair through the mediation of the Leica Gallery
- 2004 Český dřevák a jeho host Daniela Vokounová (Český dřevák and their guest, Daniela Vokounová), Malá galerie České spořitelny in Kladno, (Helbich, Kuklík, Reich, Beneš, Prokůpek, Rasl)
- 2005 Český dřevák a jeho host Richard Homola (Český dřevák and their guest, Richard Homola), Vlastivědné muzeum a galerie (National History Museum and Gallery) in Česká Lípa, (Helbich, Kuklík, Reich, Beneš, Prokůpek, Rasl)
- 2006 Český dřevák, Galerie 4, Cheb, (Helbich, Kuklík, Reich, Beneš, Prokůpek, Rasl)
- 2006 Český dřevák, Vranov nad Dyjí Castle, (Helbich, Kuklík, Reich, Beneš, Prokůpek, Rasl)
- 2006 Český dřevák, Alšova jihočeská galerie v Hluboké nad Vltavou – Wortnerův dům (Aleš South Bohemian Gallery in Hluboká nad Vltavou – Wortner House), (Helbich, Kuklík, Reich, Beneš, Prokůpek, Rasl)
- 2007 Český dřevák, Galerie auf der Pawlatsche, Vienna, Austria, (Helbich, Kuklík, Reich, Beneš, Prokůpek, Rasl)
- 2007 „Dwie Tradicje", common exhibition with photographers from the Visegrád Group countries, Galerie Pusta Górnošlanskie Centrum Kultury, Katowice, Poland.
- 2008 „Dvě tradice", common exhibition with photographers from the Visegrád Group countries, Polské kulturní středisko v Praze (Polish Cultural Centre in Prague)
- 2008 Český dřevák, Výstavní síň Foma Bohemia (Foma Bohemia Exhibition Hall), Hradec Králové, (Helbich, Kuklík, Reich, Beneš, Prokůpek, Rasl)
- 2009 Český dřevák a jeho host Karel Novotný (Český dřevák and their guest, Karel Novotný), Regionální muzeum (Regional Museum) in Mělník, (Helbich, Kuklík, Reich, Beneš, Prokůpek, Rasl)
- 2010 Český Dřevák i jego gość Jakub Byrczek, Galerie Pusta, Katowice, Poland, (Helbich, Kuklík, Reich, Beneš, Prokůpek, Rasl)
- 2018 Český dřevák Rabasova galerie, Rakovník, 8. února – 29. dubna 2018
