= Karel Pacner =

Czech publicist (1936–2021)

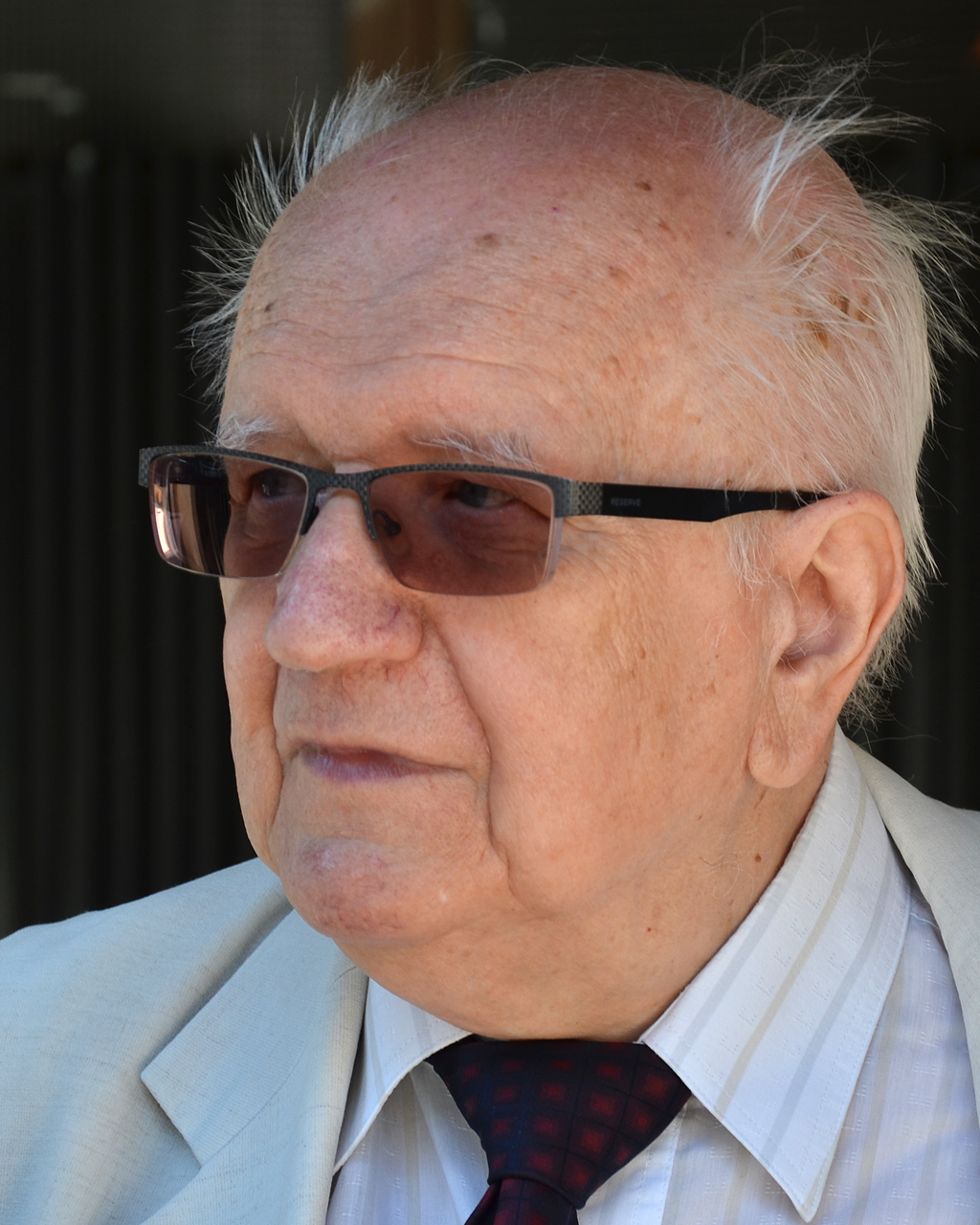
Karel Pacner

Karel Pacner (29 March 1936 – 7 April 2021) was a Czech publicist, journalist, and writer.

Pacner was born in Janovice nad Úhlavou, Czechoslovakia. His main area of focus was space exploration. He died in Prague, aged 85. Asteroid 311119 Pacner, discovered at the Kleť Observatory was named in his memory on 16 June 2021.

== Publications ==
- Pacner, Karel; Riebauerová, Martina (2007). Rytíři lékařského stavu: 14 portrét°u významných českých lékař°u (Vyd. 1 ed.). Praha: Nakl. Brána. ISBN 978-80-7243-318-6.
- Pacner, Karel, ed. (2008). Významní čeští lékaři. 1 (Vyd. 1 ed.). Praha: Brána. ISBN 978-80-7243-369-8.
- Pacner, Karel, ed. (2010). Elita české medicíny. Významní čeští lékaři / Karel Pacner (1. vyd ed.). Praha: Brána. ISBN 978-80-7243-475-6.
- Pacner, Karel (2011). Průhledy. 9: Češi v kosmu / Karel Pacner (Vyd. 1 ed.). Praha: Academia. ISBN 978-80-200-2033-8.
- Pacner, Karel (2012). Život novináře aneb "To je ten, co byl na startu Američan°u na Měsíc". Edice Paměť (Vyd. 1 ed.). Praha: Academia. ISBN 978-80-200-2136-6.
