= Karel Slabbaert =

Dutch painter and draftsman

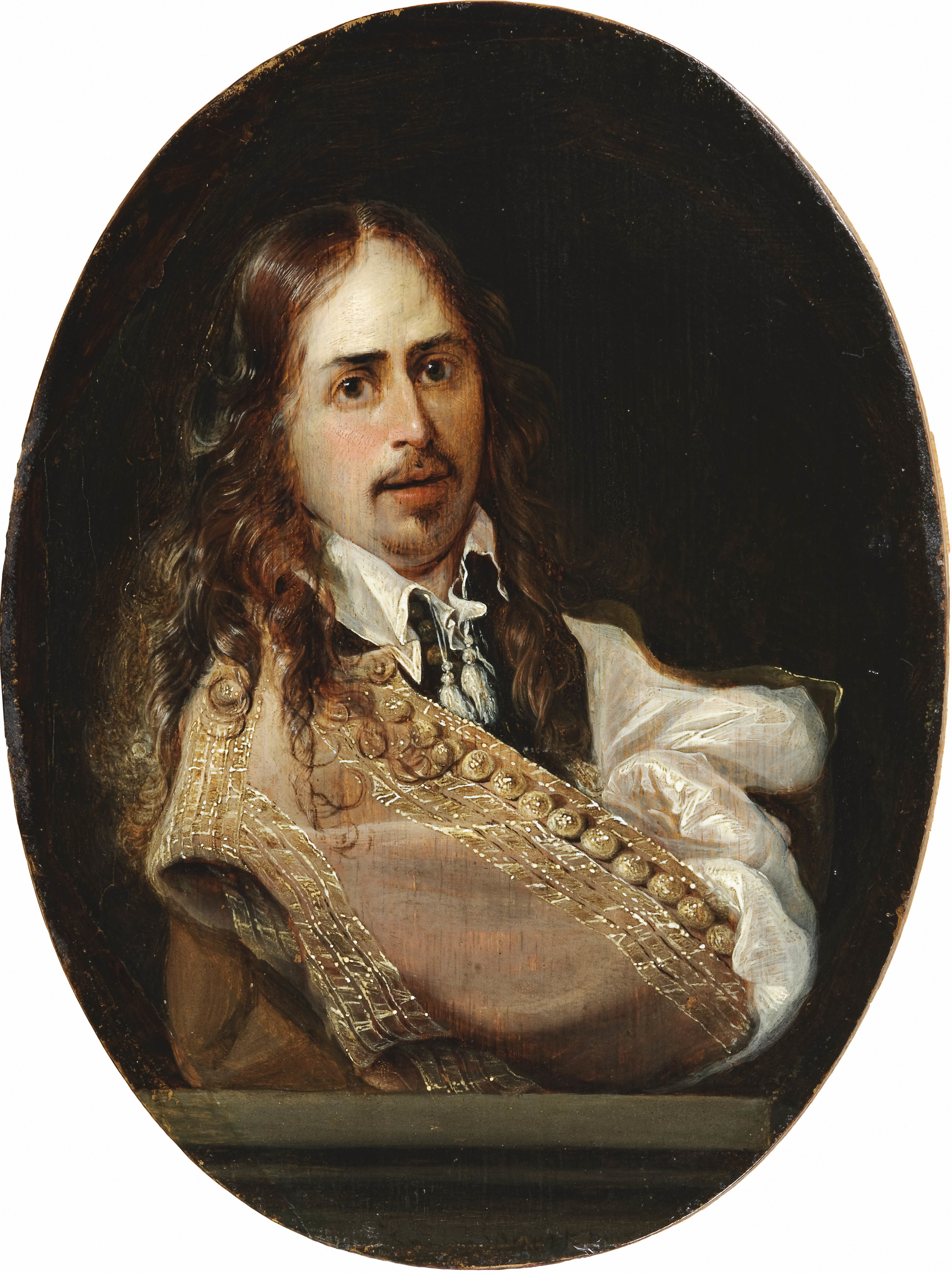
- Self-portrait, circa 1650
- Born: 1618; Zierikzee
- Died: 1654 (aged 35–36); Middelburg

Karel Slabbaert (1618 – 1654 in Zierikzee; † before November 6, 1654, in Leiden) was a Dutch painter and draftsman. The artist worked in Middelburg between 1634 and 1654 . His work includes portraits, genre scenes and still lives. He was a Dutch Golden Age painter who died at an young age.

Slabbaert was born in Zierikzee in the year 1618. His earliest dated work is recorded as 1641 and he got engaged to Cornelia Bouwers of Rotterdam on 8 April 1645. His works show familiarity with Rembrandt's studio and he was in Amsterdam in 1645 while being a member of the painter's guild in Middelburg the same year. He became the Dean of the Middelburg Guild in 1653, and he died in the same place a year later.

== Life ==
Little is known about the artist's life and only a small number of his works - mostly genre scenes - have survived. Slabbaert was born around 1619 in Zierikzee in the Dutch province of Zeeland . He married in Amsterdam in 1645 and settled in Middelburg. Here he headed the Guild of St. Luke in 1653. The painter Abraham Borm († 1668) was one of his students. In his group portrait with soldiers (Mauritshuis Den Haag), he depicted himself in the foreground. A portrait of a painter (Städel, Frankfurt am Main) a self-portrait of the artist. Karel Slabbaert died in Leiden in 1654 and was buried in Middelburg on November 6 of that year.

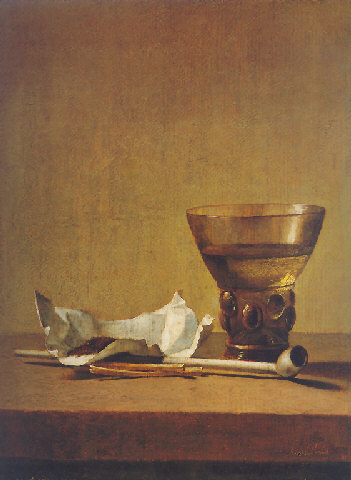
Toebackje still life, 1641

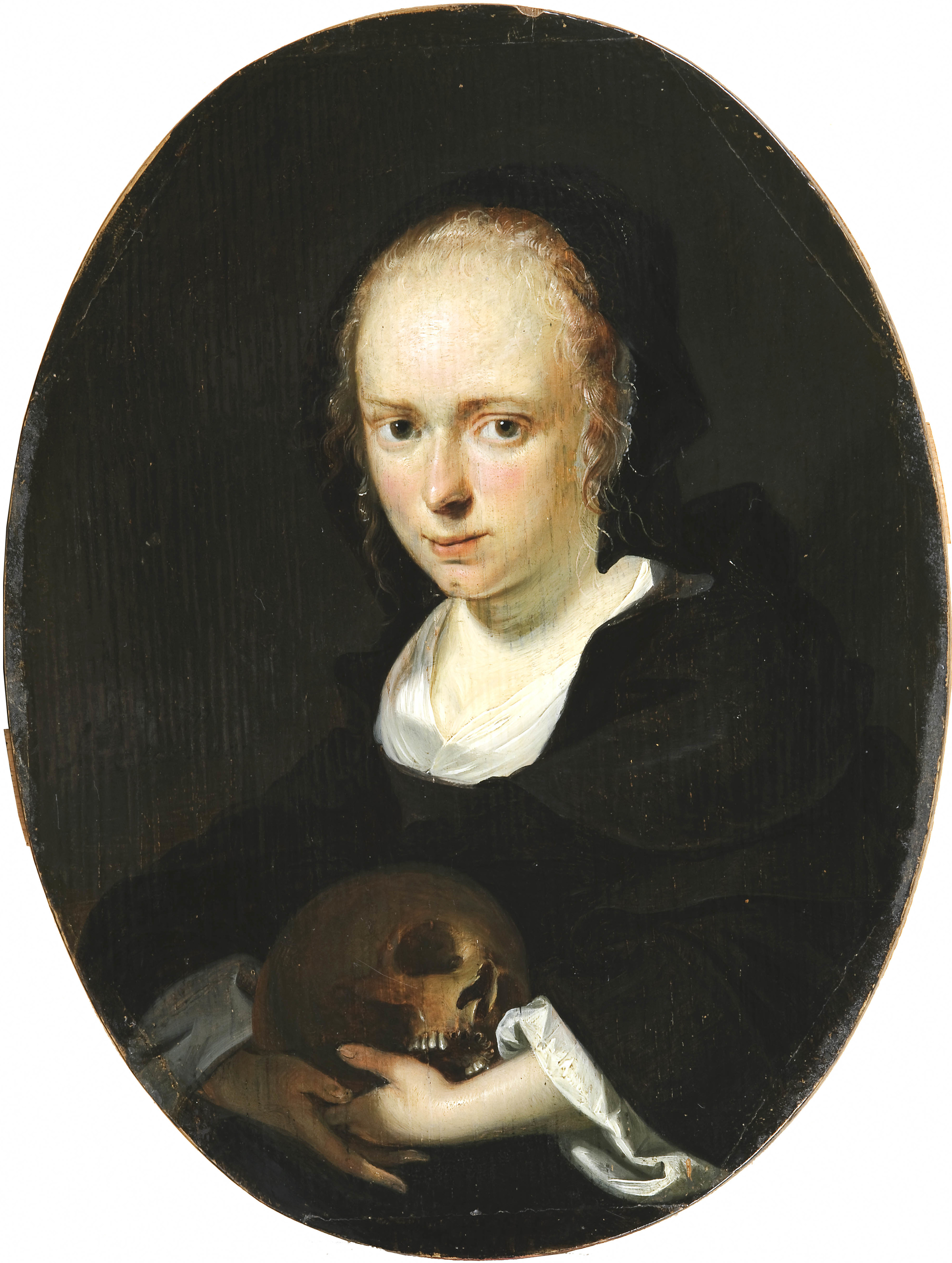
Portrait of Cornelia Bouwers
