= Henry Kariel =

Henry S. Kariel (July 7, 1924 – July 8, 2004) was an American political scientist and author. He was a prominent political scientist who was critical of pluralism.

== Books ==
- The Decline of American Pluralism. 1961
- Promise of politics. 1966
- In search of authority: twentieth-century political thought. 1964. In over 500 libraries according to WorldCat
- Open systems; arenas for political action. 1969
- Political order; a reader in political science, edited by Henry S. Kariel. 1970
- Approaches to the study of political science. Edited by Michael Haas and Henry S. Kariel. 1970
- Frontiers of democratic theory. Edited by Henry S. Kariel. 1970
- Saving appearances; the reestablishment of political science. 1972
- Beyond liberalism, where relations grow. 1977
- Desperate politics of postmodernism. 1989
- Sources in twentieth-century political thought, edited by Henry S. Kariel.
