= Karel Mejta =

Karel Mejta may refer to:

- Karel Mejta Sr. (1928–2015), Czech rower
- Karel Mejta Jr. (born 1951), Czech rower; son of the above
