= Karel Kratz =

Dutch water polo player (1893–1962)

Personal information
- Full name: Carl Kratz
- Nationality: Netherlands
- Born: 10 November 1893 Rotterdam, the Netherlands
- Died: 30 August 1962 (aged 68) Rotterdam, the Netherlands

Sport
- Sport: Water polo
National team
- Years: Team
- ?-?: Netherlands

🏴󠁧󠁢󠁥󠁮󠁧󠁿

Carl "Karel" Kratz (10 November 1893 – 30 August 1962) was a Dutch male water polo player. He was a member of the Netherlands men's national water polo team. He competed with the team at the 1920 Summer Olympics.
