= Jaroslav Beneš =

Czech photographer (born 1946)

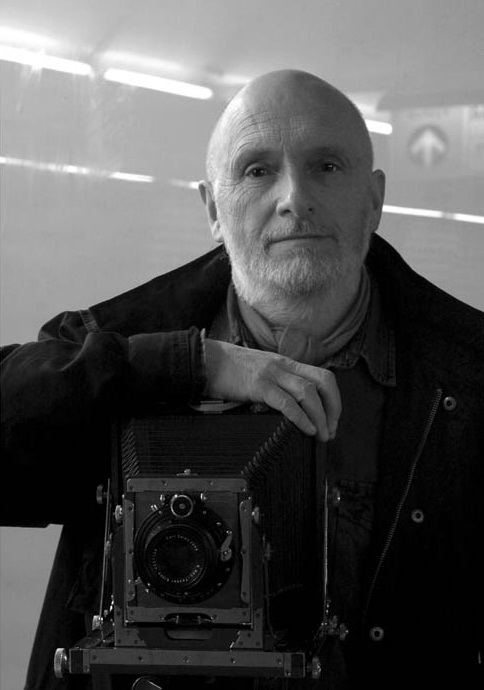
- Jaroslav Beneš in 2010
- Born: 27 February 1946 (age 80); Plzeň, Czechoslovakia
- Occupation: Photographer

Jaroslav Beneš (born 27 February 1946) is a Czech photographer and co-founder of the photographic group called Český dřevák.

== Life ==
Jaroslav Beneš was born on 27 February 1946 in Plzeň, Czechoslovakia. He has been exposed to many different forms of art since he was a child. As a schoolboy he played different musical instruments, went to the theatre with his parents, and his uncle was an amateur painter. At the beginning of the 1960s he started to attend the Secondary School of Agriculture in Plasy, where he was involved in extra-curricular activities, such as poetry, drama, and music. It was also there that he was first introduced to Chinese poetry, which he still loves today. In 1965 he graduated and began to work as a livestock specialist. Three years later he started working as a stage technician in the ALFA Theatre in Plzeň. In 1977 he moved to Prague, where he briefly worked as a night guard at the Museum of Decorative Arts. Since 1978 he has been an archivist and photographer for Prague Waterworks.

In 1989 he co-founded Aktiv volné fotografie (The Free Photography Caucus) and a year later the Prague House of Photography.

== Work ==
He began photographing with a 35 mm camera at the end of the 1960s, taking pictures of theatre performances and rock and jazz musicians. At the beginning of the 1980s, while working for Prague Waterworks, he found an old 13x18 cm view camera in a cupboard at his workplace and learned to use it. Influenced by another photographer, Jan Svoboda, who said that "a photograph should have a definitive format", Beneš started contact printing all his work. Besides 13x18 he also uses the 18x24 cm format. Unlike many other photographers whose main aim is technical perfection, Beneš does not hesitate to use technical "imperfections" to an artistic effect: "He does not mind light penetrating the film holder or his lenses vignetting, which he, in fact, uses intentionally. He deliberately integrates these elements into his creative process," says Czech art historian, Jan Kříž.

Although the subjects of Beneš's photographs are usually buildings or architectural details, he cannot be considered a photographer of architecture as such. He says of his own work: "To me, photography does not mean depicting reality. It is an irrational absorption in myself, my problems, emotions, and dreams. My photographs are only a product or, so to speak, waste of an activity that helps me to survive and balance my life." He says his main topic is the co-existence with architecture "created by and for people". He lets the genius loci of architecture influence him, but calls his photographs "purely subjective, emotional, and free from any calculation".

All of Beneš's photographs are untitled. He has only given names to four of his series, not to individual photographs:

- W Series – a series of photographs taken during an event at the Wojnowice Castle in Poland, where ten sculptors worked with ten photographers. Jaroslav Beneš photographed works by Polish sculptor and artist Jan Berdyszak, who teaches at the University of Fine Arts in Poznań (Uniwersytet Artystyczny w Poznaniu).
- L.D. Series – photographs from La Défense, Paris, taken in 1991 and during scholarship programmes in Paris in 1994 and 1995.
- K Series – photographs of industrial areas around Katowice.
- R Series – photographs of both the interior and exterior architect Otto Rothmayer's villa in Prague.

== Books ==
=== Monographs ===
- Jaroslav Beneš – Fotografie – wybór – published by Galerie Pusta, Katowice, Poland in 2006.

A catalogue accompanying Beneš's exhibition at the gallery. Includes texts by art historians Adam Sobota, Jan Kříž and Josef Moucha.

=== Anthologies ===
- Český dřevák – a self-published catalogue of the Czech photographic group Český dřevák with texts by photographer Bohumír Prokůpek and art historian Jan Kříž. Published in Prague in 2006.
- Czeski Drzewak i jego gość – published by Galerie Pusta, Katowice, Poland in 2010 on the occasion of an exhibition called Český dřevák and Their Guest. The guest artist was Polish photographer Jakub Byrczek. The catalogue includes a text by Polish art historian Joanna Turek.

== Included in collections ==
- Moravská galerie v Brně (Moravian Gallery in Brno)
- Doi Photo Plaza Gallery, Tokyo, Japan
- Polaroid Corporation's collection, Germany
- Uměleckoprůmyslové museum v Praze (Museum of Decorative Arts in Prague)
- Muzeum narodowe, Wrocław, Poland
- Maison européenne de la photographie, Paris, France
- Muzeum moderního umění (Museum of Modern Art), Olomouc
- Bibliothèque nationale de France, Paris, France
- The Museum of Fine Arts, Houston, United States
- Národní muzeum fotografie (National Museum of Photography), Jindřichův Hradec

== Gallery ==
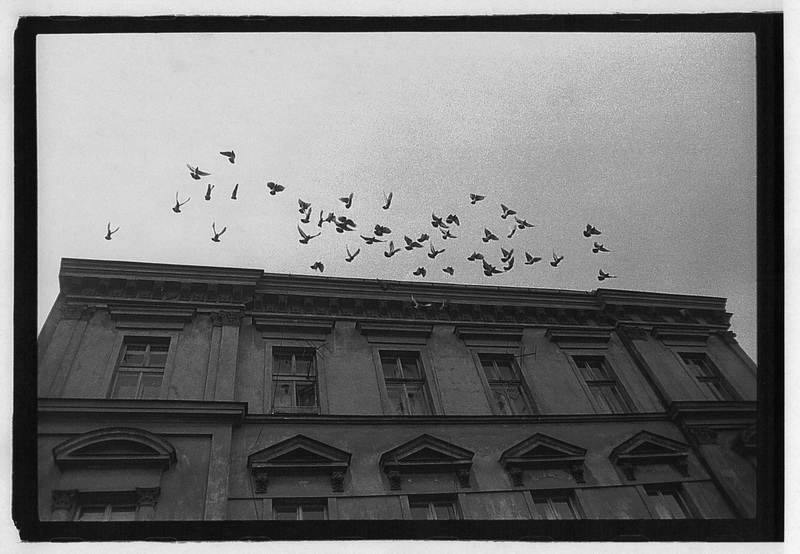
Untitled, 1976, 35 mm film

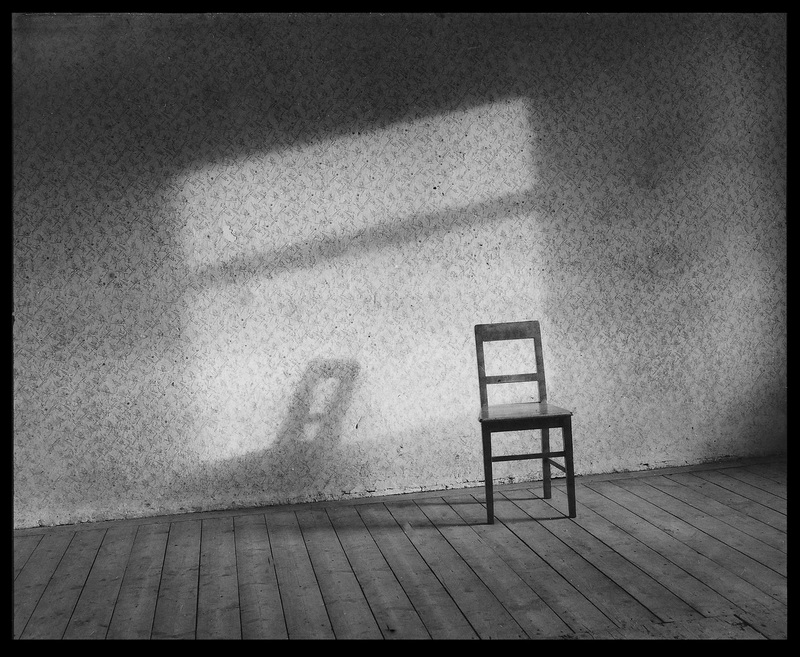
Untitled, 1978, 6x7 cm film
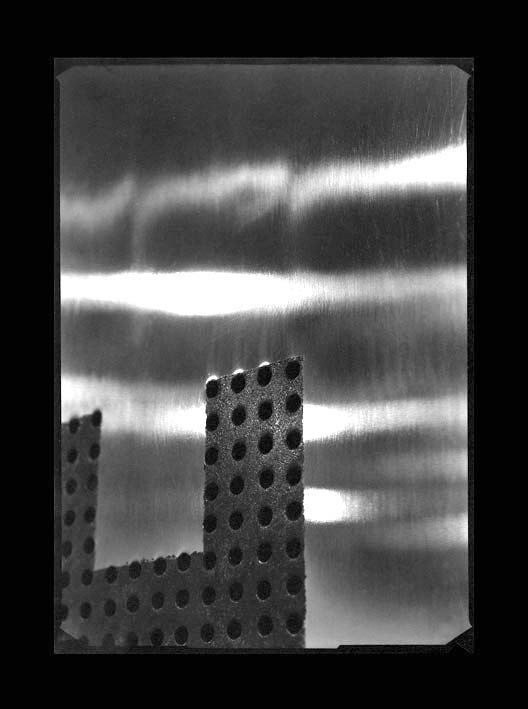
Untitled, 1981, 13x18 cm

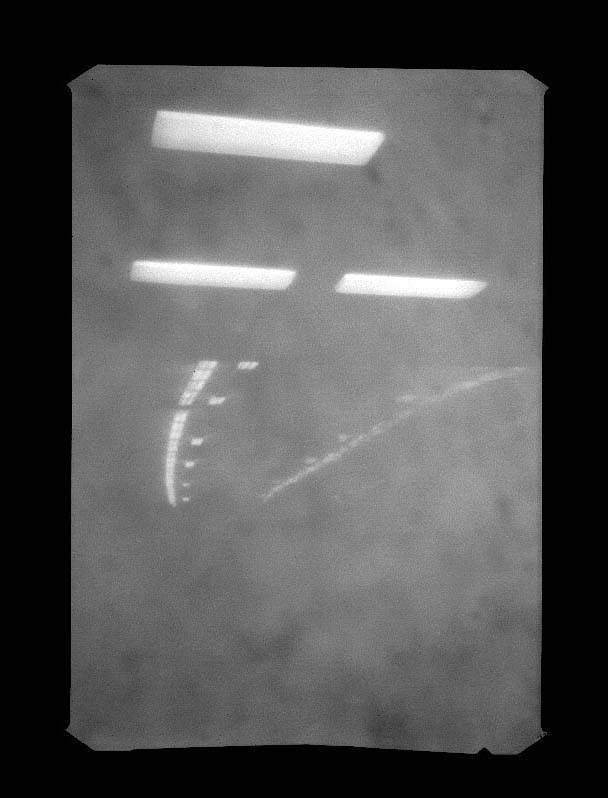
Untitled, 1982, 13x18 cm

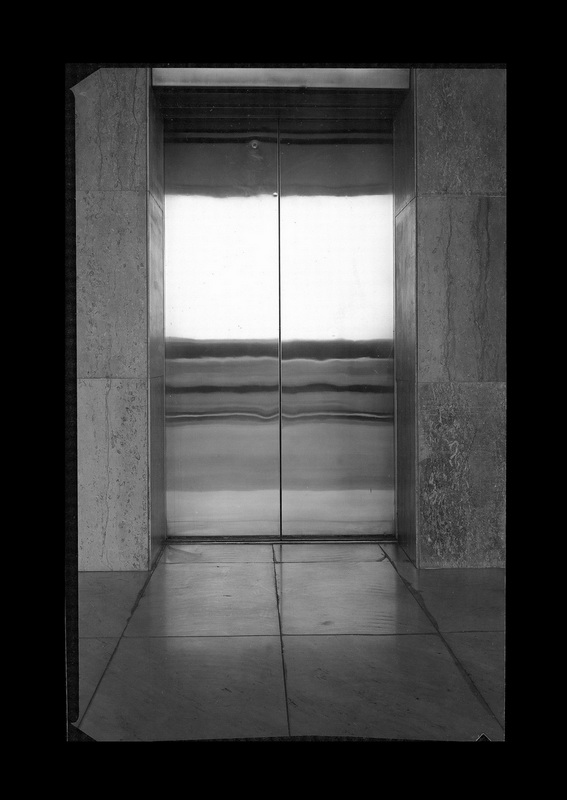
Untitled, 1984, 13x18 cm

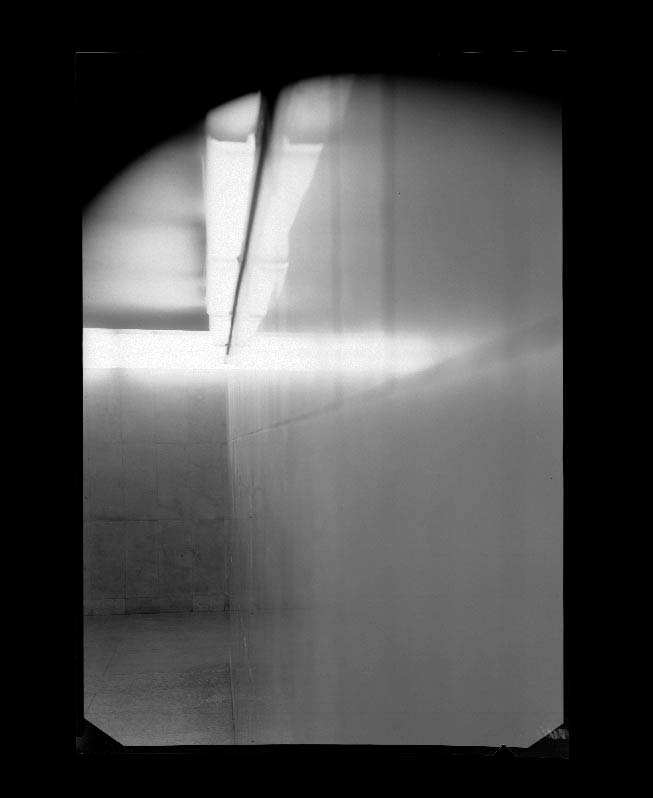
Untitled, 1988, 13x18 cm

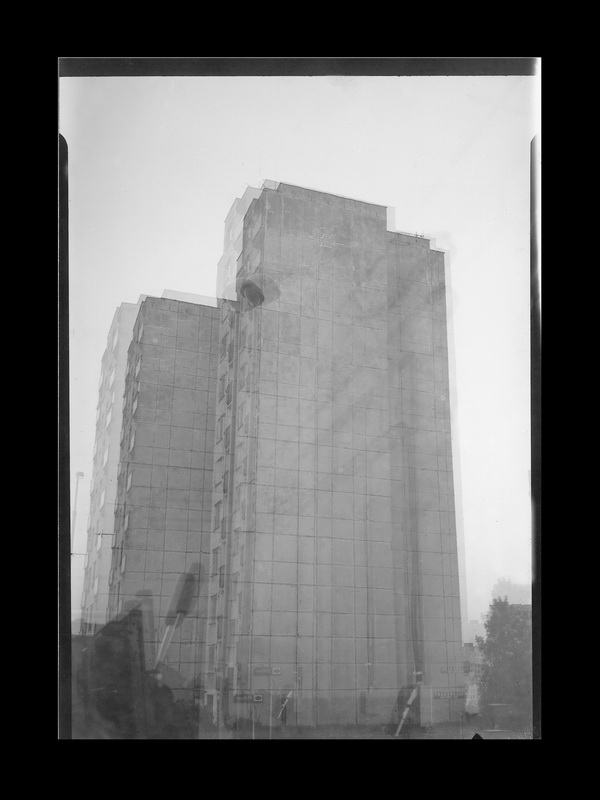
Untitled, 1999, 13x18 cm

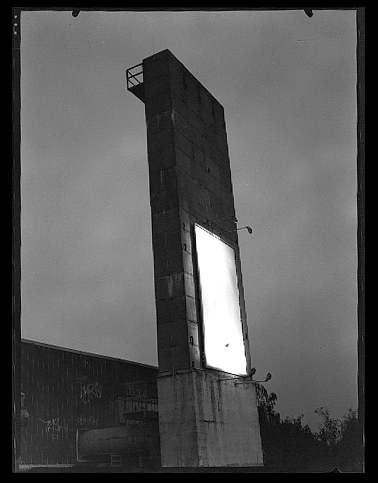
Untitled, 2005, 18x24 cm

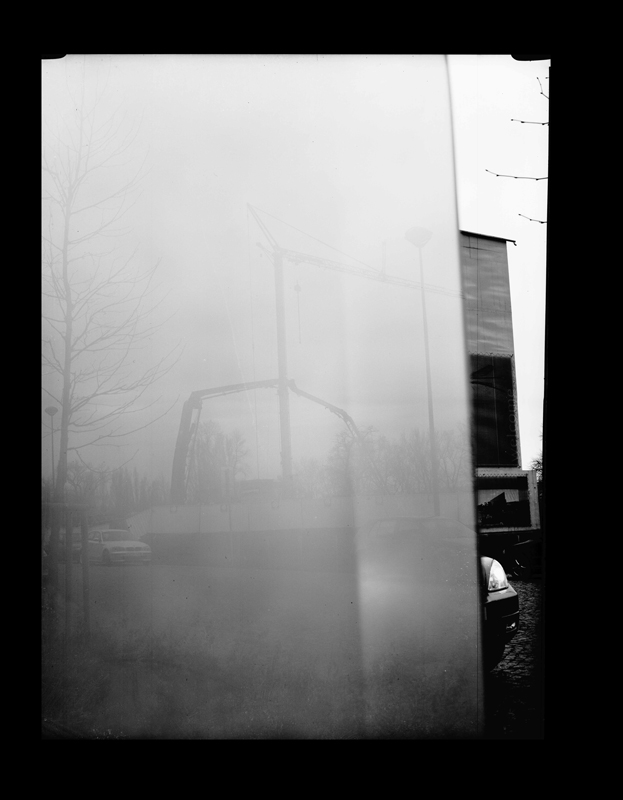
Untitled, 2006, 18x24 cm

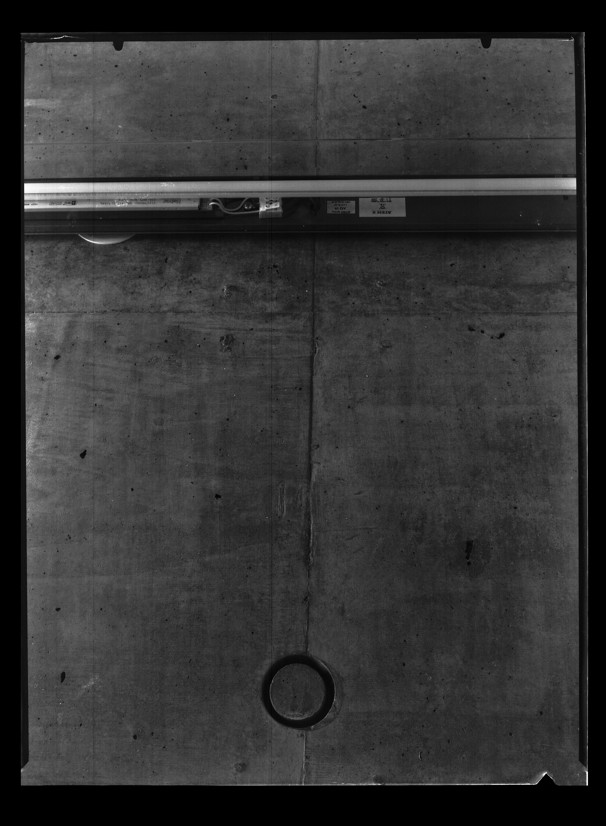
Untitled, 2010, 18x24 cm
