= Karel Novy =

Karel Novy or Karel Nový may refer to:

- Karel Novy (swimmer) (born 1980), Swiss swimmer
- Karel Nový (writer) (1890–1980), Czech writer
