= Karel Jalovec =

Czech musicologist

Karel Jalovec (17 June 1892 in Prague, Austro-Hungarian Empire) was a Czechoslovak musicologist who compiled three reference books on violins and violin makers and a two-volume encyclopedia on violin makers.

== Published works ==
- Jalovec published compilations and a two-volume general encyclopedia
1. Italian violin makers (1957)
  English edition: Italian violin makers OCLC 2428954
  German edition: Italienische Geigenbauer, translated by G. Wiener
2. The violin makers of Bohemia: including craftsmen of Moravia and Slovakia (1959)
  Czech edition: Čeští houslaři OCLC 10316161
  English edition: The violin makers of Bohemia: including craftsmen of Moravia and Slovakia OCLC 1654419
  German edition: Böhmische Geigenbauer, translated by Ferdinand Kirschner OCLC 250854444
3. German and Austrian violin-makers, English translation by George Theiner (1967) OCLC 504697
4. Encyclopedia of violin makers (two volumes) (1965)
  German edition: Enzyklopädie des Geigenbaues, translated by Charlotte and Ferdinand Kirschner OCLC 15263479
  English edition: Encyclopedia of violin makers, translated by J.B. Kokzak OCLC 669171941

== See also ==
- Category:Lutherie reference books
