= Karel Černý =

Karel Černý is the name of:

- Karel Černý (art director) (1922–2014), Czech art director
- Karel Černý (footballer) (1910–?), Czech footballer
- Carl Czerny (1791–1857), Austrian pianist, composer and teacher
