= Karel Kovář =

Karel Kovář may refer to:

- Karel Kovář (rower) (born 1942), Czech Olympic rower
- Karel Kovář (figure skater), Czech figure skater and coach
- Karel Kovář (born 1996), Czech YouTuber known as Kovy
