= Karel Hasil =

Czech footballer

Personal information
- Full name: Karel Hasil
- Date of birth: 13 June 1998 (age 28)
- Place of birth: Louny, Czech Republic
- Height: 1.90 m (6 ft 3 in)
- Position: Centre-back

Team information
- Current team: FC Brunnen
- Number: 19

Youth career
- 2004–2012: SEKO Louny
- 2012–2018: Teplice

Senior career*
Years	Team	Apps	(Gls)
2018–2022	Teplice	7	(0)
2018–2019	→ MAS Táborsko (loan)	20	(3)
2020	→ Baník Sokolov (loan)	13	(2)
2020–2021	→ Varnsdorf (loan)	23	(0)
2022–2023	Sokol Brozany	30	(2)
2023–	FC Brunnen	39	(7)

International career
2014	Czech Republic U-16	3	(0)
2016	Czech Republic U-18	2	(0)
2019	Czech Republic U-20	2	(0)
- * Club domestic league appearances and goals as of 18:22, 18 May 2025 (UTC)

Karel Hasil (born 13 July 1998) is a Czech footballer who played as a centre-back for Swiss 2. Liga Interregional side FC Brunnen.

== Career ==
=== Teplice ===
Born in Louny, Hasil started his career at local club FK SEKO Louny at the age of six, before later moving to FK Teplice at the age of 14. Hasil went through all youth categories in Teplice and was promoted to the club B-team in 2017.

==== Loan spells ====
To get some experience, Hasil was loaned out to Czech National Football League club FC MAS Táborsko for the 2018–19 season. During the season, he made 20 appearances and scored three goals.

On 29 January 2020, six months after returning from the first loan spell, Hasil was loaned out again, this time to Baník Sokolov, also in the National Football League. At Baník Sokolov, he made 13 appearances and scored two goals. On 21 August 2020, Hasil was loaned out for the third time, to FK Varnsdorf for the 2020–21 season.

==== Return to Teplice ====
Hasil returned to Teplice in the summer 2021 and was registered for the first team squad. He got his official debut for the club on 30 July 2021 against Slavia Prague. Hasil started on the bench, before replacing Alois Hyčka in the 86th minute.

=== Later career ===
In July 2022, Hasil joined Bohemian Football League side Sokol Brozany on a free transfer. A year later, in August 2023, Hasil joined Swiss 2. Liga Interregional side FC Brunnen.
