= Janovice nad Úhlavou =

- Town
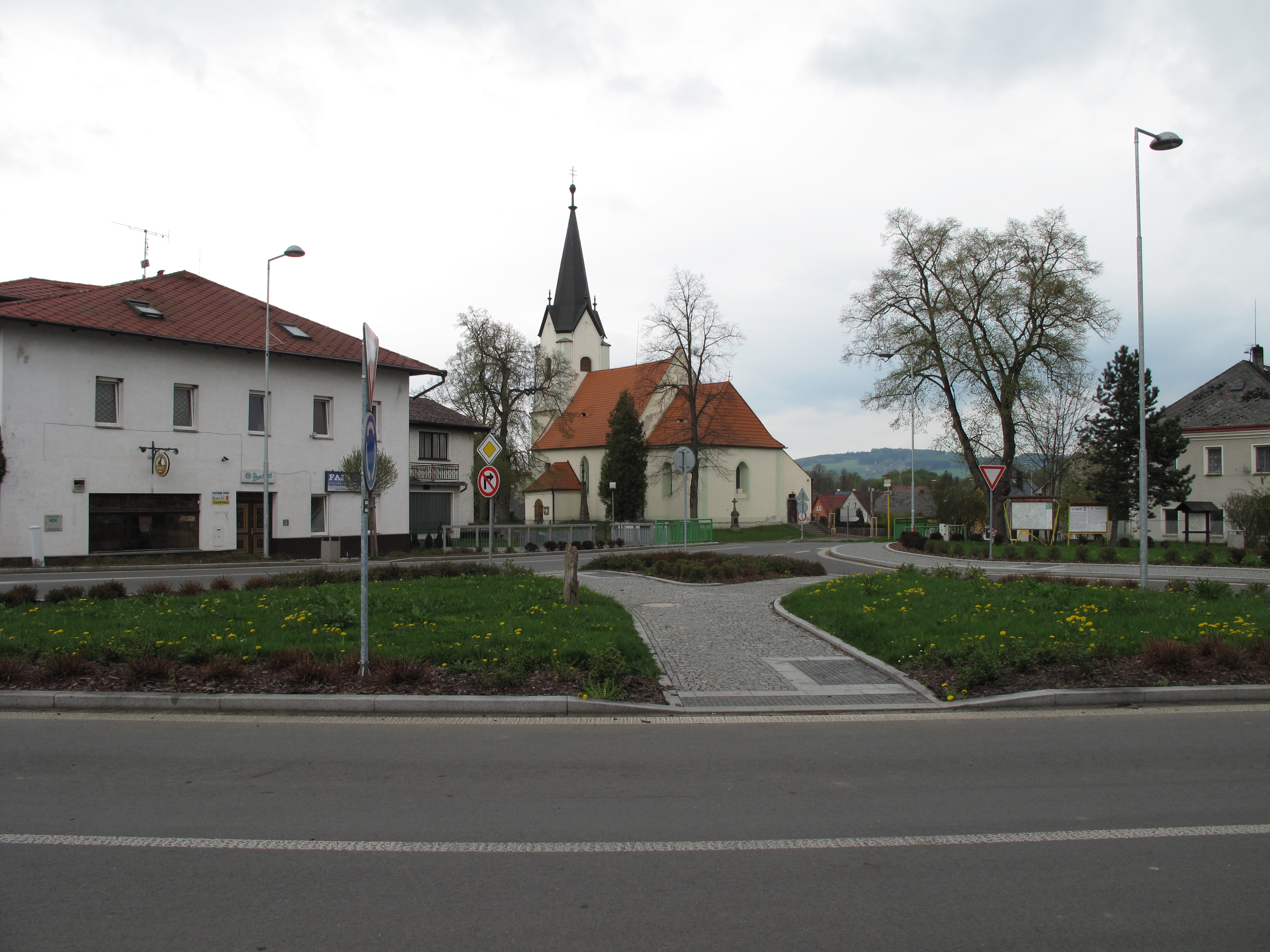
- Town square

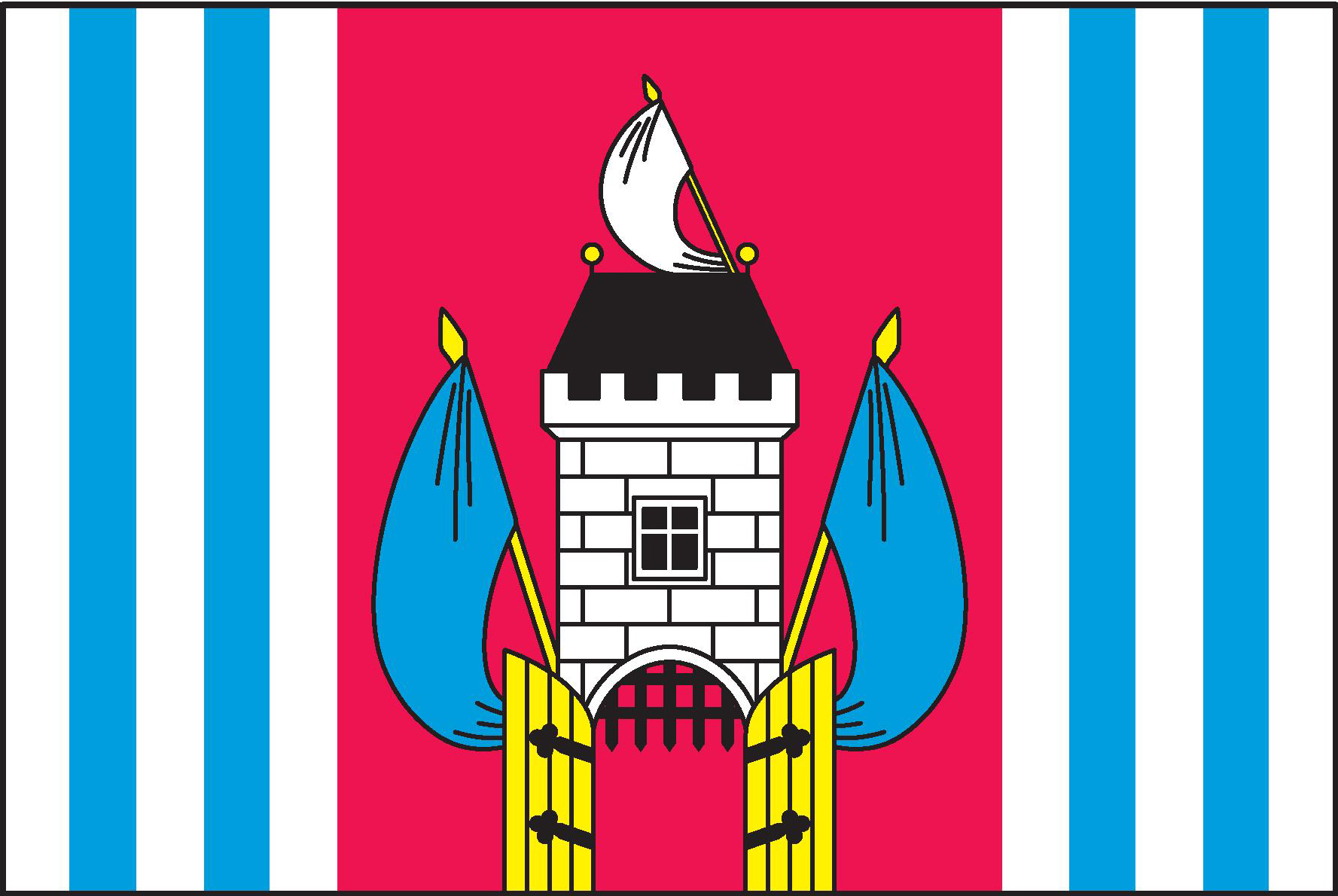
- Flag Coat of arms

- Location in the Czech Republic
- Coordinates: 49°20′42″N 13°13′9″E
- Country: Czech Republic
- Region: Plzeň
- District: Klatovy
- First mentioned: 1290

Government
  - Mayor: Michal Linhart

Area
  - Total: 28.48 km^{2} (11.00 sq mi)
- Elevation: 412 m (1,352 ft)

Population (2026-01-01)
  - Total: 2,455
  - Density: 86.20/km^{2} (223.3/sq mi)
- Time zone: UTC+1 (CET)
  - Summer (DST): UTC+2 (CEST)
- Postal codes: 340 21, 340 22
- Website: www.janovice.cz

Janovice nad Úhlavou (Czech pronunciation: [ˈjanovɪtsɛ ˈnad uːɦlavou]; German: Janowitz an der Angel) is a town in Klatovy District in the Plzeň Region of the Czech Republic. It has about 2,500 inhabitants.

== Administrative division ==
Janovice nad Úhlavou consists of 11 municipal parts (in brackets population according to the 2021 census):

- Janovice nad Úhlavou (1,843)
- Dolní Lhota (55)
- Dubová Lhota (50)
- Hvízdalka (42)
- Ondřejovice (25)
- Petrovice nad Úhlavou (108)
- Plešiny (29)
- Rohozno (46)
- Spůle (151)
- Vacovy (59)
- Veselí (61)

== Etymology ==
The name Janovice is derived from the personal name Jan, meaning "the village of Jan's people".

== Geography ==
Janovice nad Úhlavou is located about 5 kilometres (3 mi) west of Klatovy and 44 km (27 mi) south of Plzeň. It lies mostly in the Švihov Highlands, but the municipal territory extends also to the Bohemian Forest Foothills in the south and west. The highest point is the hill Na Porovnání at 639 m (2,096 ft) above sea level. The town is situated at the confluence of the Úhlava River and Jelenka Stream. Podstránský Pond is located in the northern part of the territory.

== History ==
The first written mention of Janovice nad Úhlavou is from 1290. In the second half of the 14th century, the settlement became a town.

== Demographics ==
Historical population

Year	Pop.	±%
1869	2,675	—
1880	2,901	+8.4%
1890	2,569	−11.4%
1900	2,597	+1.1%
1910	2,730	+5.1%

Year	Pop.	±%
1921	2,756	+1.0%
1930	2,496	−9.4%
1950	2,041	−18.2%
1961	2,473	+21.2%
1970	2,326	−5.9%

Year	Pop.	±%
1980	2,152	−7.5%
1991	2,067	−3.9%
2001	2,034	−1.6%
2011	2,263	+11.3%
2021	2,469	+9.1%

Source: Censuses

== Transport ==
Janovice nad Úhlavou is located on the railway line Prague–Plzeň–Železná Ruda and thus has a direct connection to the capital. The line from Klatovy to Domažlice also passes through the town.

== Sights ==
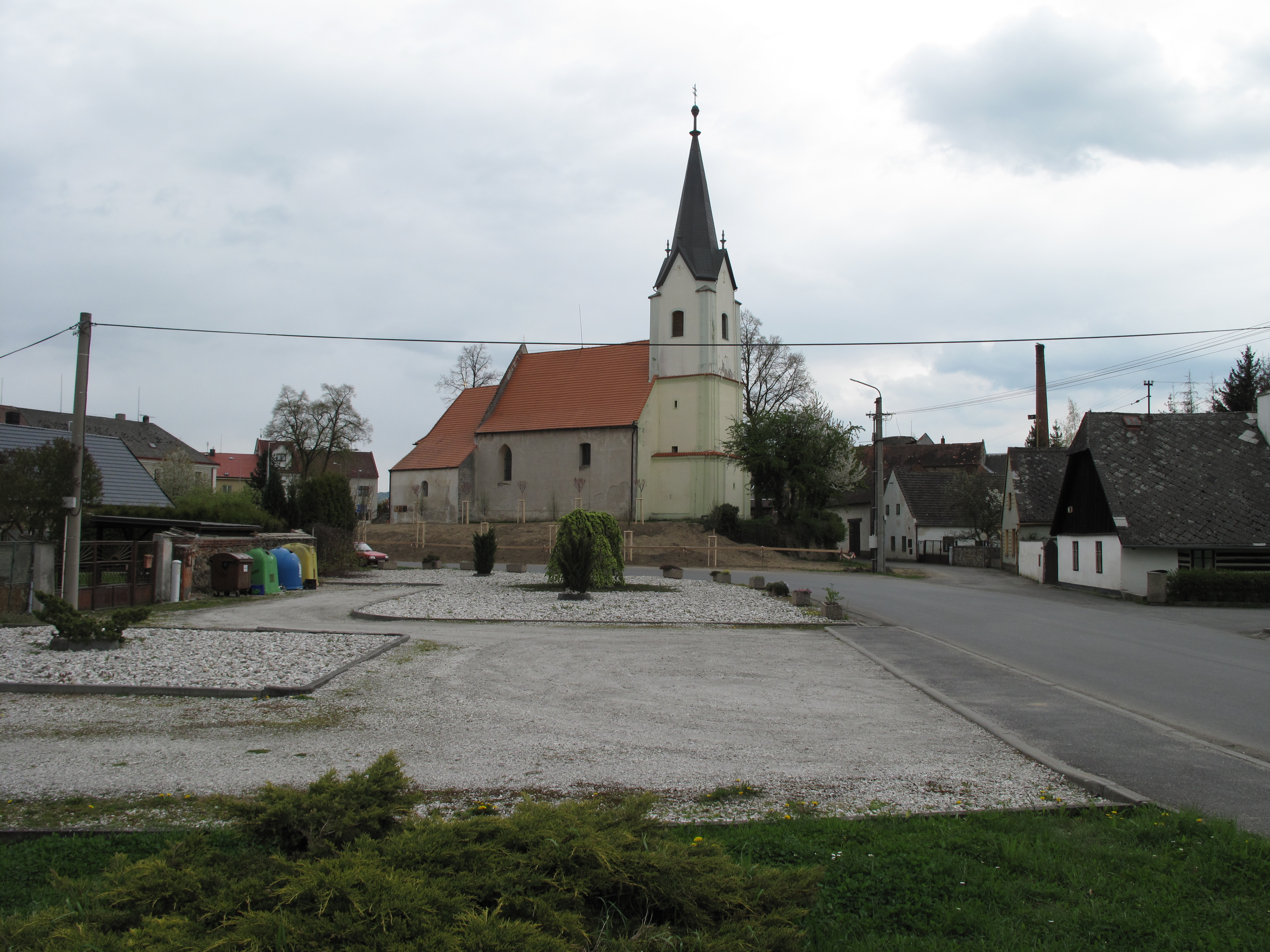
Church of Saint John the Baptist

The most valuable building is the Church of Saint John the Baptist. It is an early Gothic building from around 1260. In 1764, it was modified in the Baroque style and the tower was added.

A cultural monument is the Jewish cemetery from the early 18th century.

== Notable people ==
- Karel Pacner (1936–2021), journalist and writer
