= 1682 Karel =

Stony asteroid

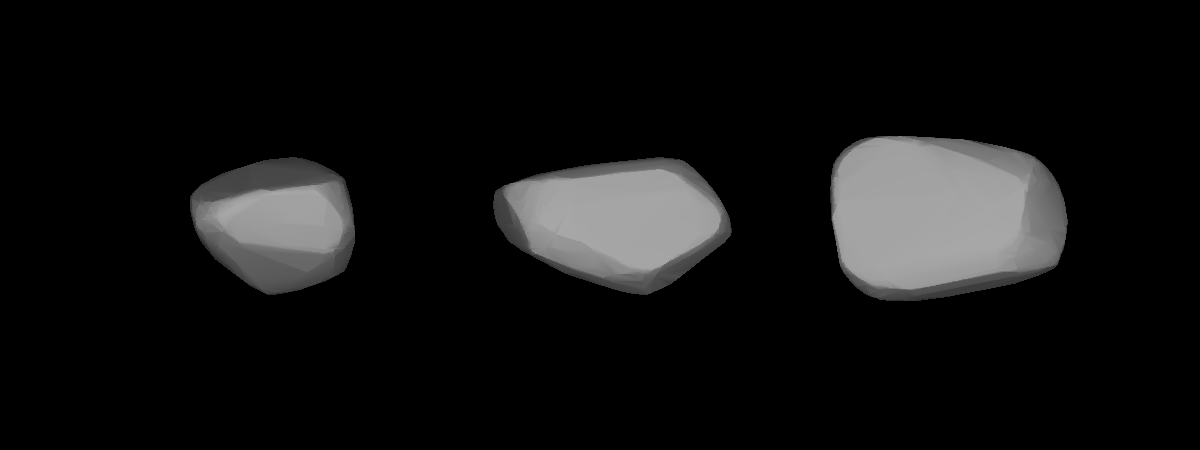
- Lightcurve-based 3D-model of Karel

Discovery
- Discovered by: K. Reinmuth
- Discovery site: Heidelberg Obs.
- Discovery date: 2 August 1949

Designations
- Named after: Karel van Houten (son of astronomers); Cornelis and Ingrid
- Alternative designations: 1949 PH · 1929 SD; 1939 RK · 1946 WC; 1949 QQ · 1949 QX_{1} 1949 SL · 1959 PH; 1988 CR_{3}
- Minor planet category: main-belt · Flora

Orbital characteristics
- Epoch 4 September 2017 (JD 2458000.5)
- Uncertainty parameter 0
- Observation arc: 87.39 yr (31,918 days)
- Aphelion: 2.6685 AU
- Perihelion: 1.8085 AU
- Semi-major axis: 2.2385 AU
- Eccentricity: 0.1921
- Orbital period (sidereal): 3.35 yr (1,223 days)
- Mean anomaly: 106.49°
- Mean motion: 0° 17^{m} 39.48^{s} / day
- Inclination: 4.0276°
- Longitude of ascending node: 325.78°
- Argument of perihelion: 9.9066°

Physical characteristics
- Dimensions: 4.80±0.55 km 7.267±0.195 km 7.47 km (calculated)
- Synodic rotation period: 3.37485±0.00003 h 3.37485±0.00005 h
- Geometric albedo: 0.24 (assumed); 0.278±0.027; 0.531±0.124
- Spectral type: S
- Absolute magnitude (H): 12.70 · 12.8 · 12.82±0.32 · 12.90

1682 Karel, provisional designation 1949 PH, is a stony Florian asteroid from the inner regions of the asteroid belt, approximately 7.5 kilometers in diameter.

It was discovered on 2 August 1949, by German astronomer Karl Reinmuth at Heidelberg Observatory in southern Germany, and later named after the son of Dutch astronomer couple Ingrid and Cornelis van Houten.

== Orbit and classification ==
Karel is a member of the Flora family, one of the largest collisional populations of stony asteroids in the inner main-belt. It orbits the Sun at a distance of 1.8–2.7 AU once every 3 years and 4 months (1,223 days). Its orbit has an eccentricity of 0.19 and an inclination of 4° with respect to the ecliptic. In 1929, Karel was first identified as 1929 SD at Heidelberg, extending the body's observation arc by 20 years prior to its official discovery observation.

== Physical characteristics ==
=== Rotation period ===
Astronomers François Colas, Jean Lecacheux, Federico Manzini and Raoul Behrend obtained a rotational lightcurve of Karel from photometric observations in January 2008. It gave a well-defined rotation period of 3.37485 hours with a brightness variation of 0.47 in magnitude (U=3). An identical period was modeled from the Lowell Photometric Database (U=n.a.).

=== Diameter and albedo ===
According to the survey carried out by the Japanese Akari satellite and NASA's Wide-field Infrared Survey Explorer with its subsequent NEOWISE mission, Karel measures 4.80 and 7.27 kilometers in diameter, and its surface has an albedo of 0.278 and 0.531, respectively. The Collaborative Asteroid Lightcurve Link assumes an albedo of 0.24 – derived from 8 Flora, the largest member and namesake of this family – and calculates a diameter of 7.47 kilometers based on an absolute magnitude of 12.8.

== Naming ==
This minor planet was named after Karel van Houten, son of Dutch astronomers Ingrid and Cornelis van Houten of the Leiden Observatory. Together with Ingrid, Reinmuth discovered the minor planet 1691 Oort in 1956. Reinmuth also named his two discoveries, 1673 van Houten and 1674 Groeneveld, after the prolific couple of Dutch astronomers. The official naming citation was published by the Minor Planet Center on 15 December 1968 (M.P.C. 2901).
