= Karell Émard =

Canadian ice hockey forward

- Born: April 18, 1988 (age 37) Marieville, Quebec, Canada
- Height: 168 cm (5 ft 6 in)
- Position: Forward
- Shoots: Left
- PWHPA team: Montréal
- Played for: Les Canadiennes de Montréal; St. Lawrence University
- Playing career: 2015–present

Karell Émard is a Canadian former ice hockey forward, who last played with the Montréal section of the Professional Women's Hockey Players Association (PWHPA). Known for her two-way play and skills as a faceoff specialist, she won the Clarkson Cup in 2017 with Les Canadiennes de Montréal. She is currently an Analyst for Réseau des sports (RDS) and a Professional Women's Hockey League (PWHL) Agent for Collective Pivot.

== Career ==
Émard began playing hockey at the age of four, playing on boys' teams throughout most of her teenage years. When she was 17, she played a handful of games for the Montreal Axion in the original National Women's Hockey League.

From 2007 to 2012, she studied and played at St. Lawrence University in the United States, getting a bachelor's degree in psychology and modern language and then a master's degree in educational leadership and administration. Across 157 NCAA games with the university, she scored 106 points, serving as team captain for the 2010–11 season. She was named to the ECAC Hockey All-Rookie Team in 2007 and led St. Lawrence to the ECAC Hockey Championship in 2012.

After graduating, she stepped away from playing hockey for three years to serve as an assistant coach on Colgate University's ice hockey programme. She would later serve as an assistant coach for Concordia University during the 2016–17, while she was playing professionally.

She was drafted 13th overall by Les Canadiennes de Montréal in the 2015 CWHL Draft, and would sign her first professional contract with the team ahead of the 2015–16 season. In her rookie CWHL season, she scored 13 points in 24 games. She scored a career-best 21 points in 27 games in the 2017–18 season. In April 2018, she joined the CBC Montreal team in the annual Montreal Media Celebrity Hockey charity tournament.

After the collapse of the CWHL in May 2019, she joined the newly formed Professional Women's Hockey Players Association (PWHPA) as a member of the Montréal hub. During the creation of the PWHPA, she served as one of the representatives for the Canadiennes players. She played for Team Poulin at the Unifor Showcase in September 2019. She then appeared for Team Knight at the Dunkin’ Showcase, the first PWHPA event held in the United States. She was again named to the Montréal hub roster for the 2020–21 PWHPA season.

=== International ===
Émard was a member of the Canadian Under-22 Developmental Team, but has yet to make an appearance for the senior national team.
