= Karel van der Pluym =

Dutch painter

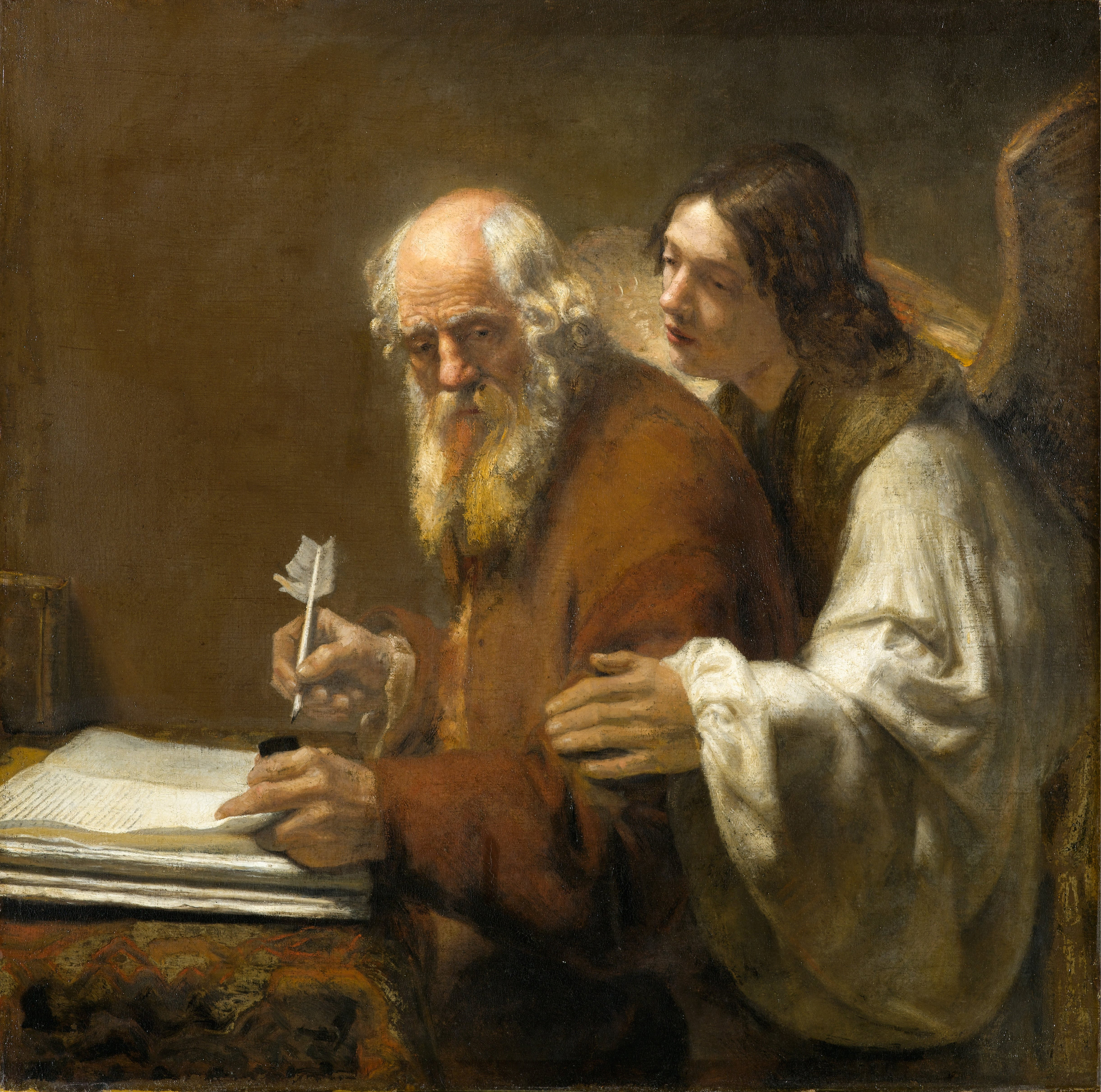
St. Matthew and the Angel

Karel van der Pluym (1625, Leiden – 1672, Leiden), was a Dutch Golden Age painter.

== Biography ==
He was the son of Dominicus van der Pluym (1593-1661) and Cornelia van Suytbroeck (1597-1652), the first cousin of Rembrandt. According to the RKD he was a pupil of Rembrandt. According to the Frick gallery, their "old woman with a book" was purchased by Henry Clay Frick in 1916 as a Rembrandt.

Media related to Karel van der Pluym at Wikimedia Commons
