= Karel Minnie =

South African politician

Member of the National Assembly
- In office 23 April 2004 – May 2009
- Constituency: Gauteng

Personal details
- Born: Karel Johannes Minnie; 13 March 1954 (age 72)
- Citizenship: South Africa
- Party: Democratic Alliance

Karel Johannes Minnie (born 13 March 1954) is a South African politician from Gauteng. He represented the Democratic Alliance (DA) in the National Assembly from 2004 to 2009. He was elected to his seat in the 2004 general election, ranked 15th on the DA's party list for Gauteng, and he served as the party's spokesperson on public service and administration. He did not stand for re-election in 2009.
