= Karel Van Hassel =

Belgian cyclist

Personal information
- Born: 14 September 1904
- Died: 12 June 1989 (aged 84)

Cycling career
- Sport: Cycling
- Discipline: Road
- Role: Rider

Karel Van Hassel (14 September 1904 – 12 June 1989) was a Belgian racing cyclist. He rode in the 1929 Tour de France.
