= Karel Kratochvíl =

Czech footballer

Personal information
- Full name: Karel Kratochvíl
- Date of birth: 8 June 1982 (age 44)
- Place of birth: Prague, Czechoslovakia
- Height: 1.85 m (6 ft 1 in)
- Position: Defender

Team information
- Current team: FK Kolín

Senior career*
Years	Team	Apps	(Gls)
1999–2006	Slavia Prague	33	(0)
2006–2007	SK Kladno	8	(0)
2007–2008	FC Shakhter Karagandy	0	(0)
2008–2009	FC Hradec Králové	25	(0)
2009–2010	CS Gaz Metan Mediaş	7	(0)
2014–	FK Kolín	4	(0)
- * Club domestic league appearances and goals as of 31 December 2014

Karel Kratochvíl (born 8 June 1982) is a Czech footballer currently playing for FK Kolín.
