= Karel Pexidr =

Czech writer, philosopher and composer (1929–2026)

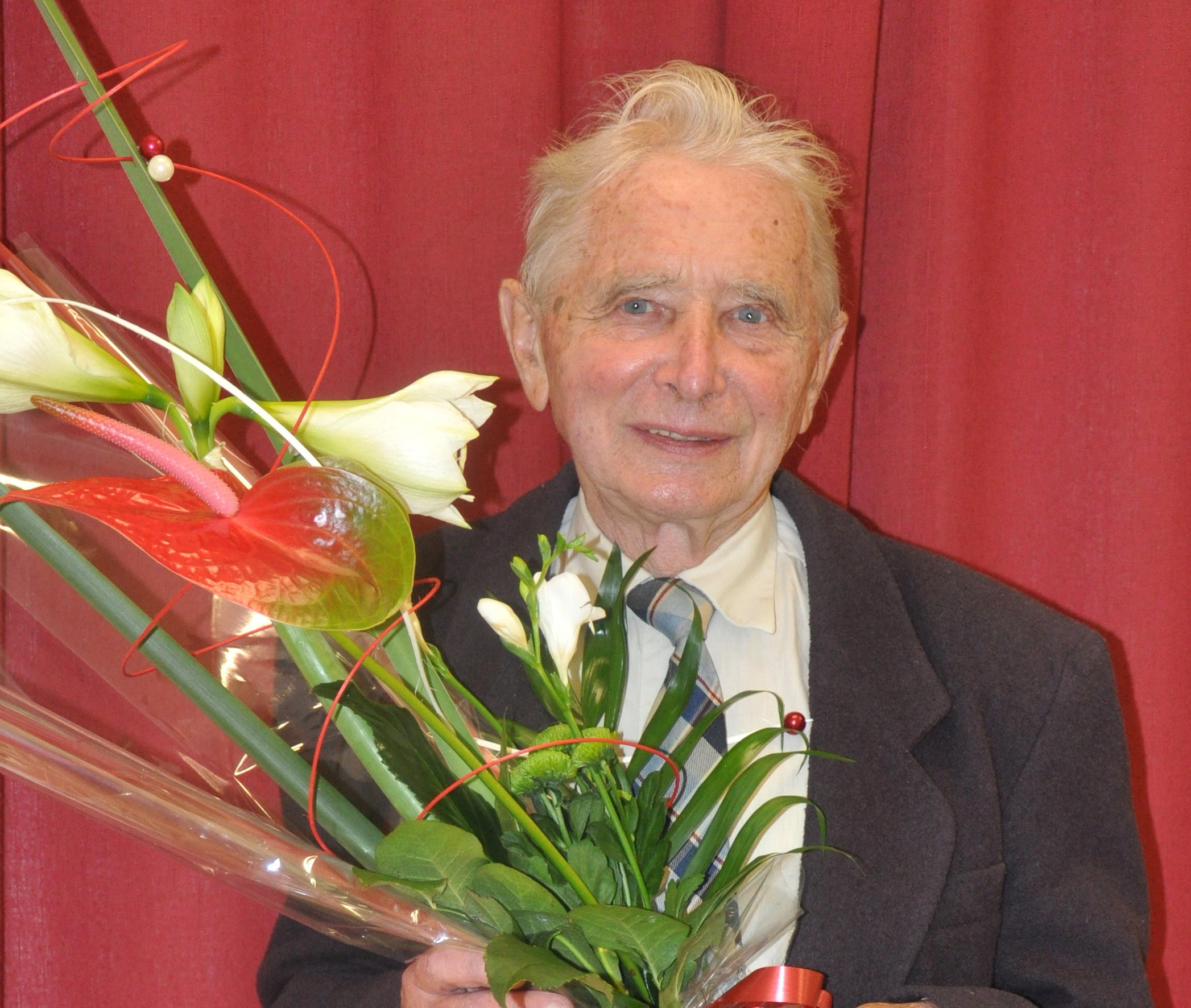
- Pexidr in 2014

Background information
- Born: 4 November 1929; Prague, Czechoslovakia
- Died: 29 June 2026 (aged 96)
- Genre: Classical
- Occupations: Lawyer, teacher, composer
- Years active: 1958–2026
- Labels: Nakladatelství Alfa, Host do domu, Epocha
- Website: www.karelpexidr.cz

Karel Pexidr (4 November 1929 – 29 June 2026) was a Czech writer, lawyer, philosopher and composer of classical music.

== Curriculum ==
The history of the Pexidr family goes back to the South Bohemian town of Protivín, yet both the parents and grandparents of Karel Pexidr lived in Plzeň, where he has been living. However, he was born in the Prague-Podolí maternity hospital on 4 November 1929.

After finishing his secondary studies at the classical grammar school in Plzeň in 1948, he went to Prague to study Law at the Legal Faculty of Charles University. He was forced to interrupt his studies in 1951 due to political interventions against certain cultured strata of inhabitants and summoned to more than two years of forced labour at a military type of camp. He was allowed to finish his studies in 1955, and finally to acquire the academic title of doctor. In 1963, he got married.

Then he worked in the position of a legal specialist in various socialist organizations existing in those times until 1990 when he was entitled to retire. Between 1993 and 1999 he lectured philosophy at the University of West Bohemia in Plzeň. Between 1993 and 2011 he was head of an agricultural cooperative in Horšice.

Pexidr died on 29 June 2026, at the age of 96.

== Philosophical publications ==
=== In Czech ===
- Úvod do studia etiky (An introduction to ethic studies), Plzeň: Vydavatelství ZČU 1996
- Relativistická filozofie (Relativist philosophy), Plzeň: Vydavatelství ZČU 1996
- Psychologie a gnozeologie (Psychology and epistemology), Dobrá Voda u Pelhřimova: Aleš Čeněk 2000
- Kosmologie z pohledu filozofa (Cosmology in the view of a philosopher), Dobrá voda u Pelhřimova: Aleš Čeněk 2003
- Kauzalita (Causality), (co-author Nikolaj Demjančuk), Plzeň: Aleš Čeněk 2009
- Filosofie pro každého (Philosophy for everybody), Praha: Alfa nakladatelství 2009
- Člověk, tvor neznámý (Man, an unknown creature), Praha: Alfa nakladatelství 2011
- Filosofické aforismy (Philosophical aphorisms), Praha: Alfa nakladatelství 2012

=== In English ===
- Philosophy for Everyone, Praha: Alfa nakladatelství 2012
- Causality, Cambridgeshire: Melrosebooks 2013
- Man, an unknown creature, Cambridgeshire: Melrosebooks 2014
- Philosophical Aphorisms, Cambridgeshire: Melrosebooks 2015
- Relativist Philosophy, Plzeň: Vydavatelství ZČU 2016

== Literary works ==
Pexidr did not find any public outlet for his literary works (much the same as the philosophic ones) before 1989. Down to that turning point the publishing houses under state control would not accept any manuscripts that did not comply with the political, ideological and cultural principles of the Communist regime.

The literary production of Karel Pexidr falls into three types of genre:

=== Short stories ===
- Blázniviny (Foolish tales), Plzeň: Nava 1997
- Bajky (Fables), Plzeň: Nava 1999
- Kavkovské kontrapunkty (Kafka counter-points), Plzeň: Perseus 2000
- Přeludy (Illusions), Plzeň: Nava 2007
- Cesty k cíli (Ways to the goal), Praha: Epocha 2014

=== Non-fiction ===
- Vícov (Village Vícov), Plzeň: Veselý 1996
- Kalifornie, jak jsem ji viděl (California, as I have seen it), Plzeň: Nava 1999
- Jak žít (How to live), Plzeň: Nava 2006
- Nové vyprávění ze staré Plzně (New narrations from old Plzeň), Plzeň: Nava 2009

=== Poetry ===
- Hříčka poezie (Poetic wordplays) – at the author´s expense
- Básně (Poems), Plzeň: Perseus 2003

== Musical works ==
Pexidr has been an active musician since his early youth. He deepened his musical education acquired at the Smetana School of Music at Plzeň through further studies and consultations with František Rauch, pianist and professor at the Prague Academy of Music, as well as with composer Dr. Jindřich Feld in Prague. Pexidr´s musical work counts 119 compositions covering orchestral works, chamber pieces and vocal compositions for voice solo. A number of instructive pieces are dedicated to children.

== Awards ==
- Bohumil Polan Prize, for the collection of short prosaic pieces Illusions (Přeludy), awarded 21 November 2008
