= Karel Svoboda =

Karel Svoboda may refer to:

- Karel Svoboda (composer) (1938–2007), Czech composer of popular music
- Karel Svoboda (artist) (1824–1870), Czech/Austrian painter
- Karel Svoboda (scientist) (born 1965), neuroscientist
- Karel Svoboda (table tennis) (1913–1943), Czech table tennis player
