= Karel Hradil =

Karel Hradil may refer to:

- Karel Hradil (canoeist) (born 1937), Czechoslovak sprint canoeist
- Karel Hradil (triple jumper) (born 1953), Czechoslovak triple jumper
