= Karel Komzák =

Karel Komzák may refer to:

- Karel Komzák I (1823–1893), a Bohemian composer, organist, bandmaster and conductor
- Karel Komzák II (1850–1905), a Bohemian-born Viennese composer of dances and marches
