= Karel Fortýn =

Czech surgeon (1930–2001)

Karel Fortýn (17 April 1930 – 4 January 2001) was a Czech surgeon who invented a controversial surgical method in healing cancer called devitalization, which has subsequently been referred to as devascularization.

== Tumor devitalization technique ==
Fortýn discovered the devitalization technique in 1957 shortly after graduating from medical school. The devitalization procedure suffocates the cancerous tumor by cutting of blood flow to the affected tissue via ligation. It is highly controversial, as it leaves the dead and decomposing tissue in the body, resulting in a high risk of infection in the already vulnerable patient.

In 2001, a phase I clinical study was conducted across four major cancer centers in the Czech Republic. The study involved the treatment of a cohort composed of twenty-five patients diagnosed with metastatic colorectal carcinoma and a cohort of patients diagnosed with melanoma, all of whom had advanced malignancy and were deemed ineligible for more traditional treatments such as chemotherapy and radiotherapy. The results of the study were mixed. In the patients with colorectal cancer, one patient was tumor free for one year post-operation and one achieved disease stabilization. However, five of the patients suffered from wound complications from the procedure, and one patient developed suppurative peritonitis, a serious, often fatal infection of the peritoneum. Among the twenty-four patients with melanoma, three experienced tumor regression and one experienced disease stabilization. All patients experienced disease progression in metastases, and four experienced minor wound complications. The study was discontinued prematurely.

As of 2002, The Czech Doctors Association strongly opposes the use of the technique in cancer treatments. In 2002, the head of the association, David Rath, said "the vast majority of doctors do not believe devitalisation can play a significant role in treating cancer."

A 2018 study on complete tumor devascularization (CTD) concluded that the currently published data does not conclusively demonstrate the efficacy of the treatment for malignant human tumors. However, also in the conclusions, the study identified CTD as potential method for inducing immune responses against strongly immunogenic tumors.

== Personal life ==
He had a son, Karel Fortýn, who dedicated his life to educating humans about reptiles, and founded the Seaway Serpentarium in Ontario, Canada. This exhibit housed Blade & Suede, two adult Orinoco crocodiles, whose offspring are (as of 2022) being released in Venezuela.

Karel often spoke of his father's medical genius, and how it was covered up by communist government. Luckily, unfortunately 5 years after the son's passing, the truth came out about the cancer treatments.
