= Karel Pekelharing =

Dutch dancer, choreographer and resistance member

Karel August Pekelharing (Hoorn, 6 April 1909 – Overveen, 10 June 1944) was a Dutch dancer and choreographer who, when World War II broke out, joined the Dutch resistance, and was executed by the German occupying forces in 1944.

A gay man, in 1940 Pekelharing was a dancer with the Nederlandsch Ballet. Wanted in 1941 on charges of antifascism and communism, he fled to Kassel, Germany, and found work as a translator and a streetcar conductor. When it was discovered he had engaged in sabotage, in 1942, he returned to the Netherlands, performing privately as a dancer and orator. He wrote poetry (a poem written before the war, "Harlekynade van den dood. Een oud lied op nieuwe wijs", was published under the pseudonym Karel de Hoogh in 1943) and a novel, and in 1943 he became a member of the armed resistance, by joining the group called Raad van Verzet group. One of his feats was participating in a raid that liberated Truus van Everdingen, the wife of resistance man Jan Hendrik van Gilse (1912–1944). He was arrested on 6 April (?) 1944 by the Sicherheitspolizei und SD (abbreviated Sipo in Dutch) at the American Hotel on the Leidseplein, Amsterdam, and then jailed at the nearby jailhouse on the Weteringschans. He was sentenced to death on 10 June 1944 and executed the same day. He was reburied on the Erebegraafplaats Bloemendaal, an honorary cemetery for victims of the Nazis.

In 2021 a Stolperstein was installed in his honour, on Rombout Hogerbeetsstraat street, Amsterdam.
