= Karin (given name) =

- Gender: female (in Germanic languages and Japan), male (in Thailand)

Origin
- Meaning: pure

Other names
- Related names: Katherine, Katrin, Karen, Karine, Karyn

Karin or Carin is a common feminine given name in various Germanic languages (geographically including Austria, Germany, Netherlands, Scandinavia, and Switzerland), and Estonia and Slovenia, and in some French-speaking areas, as well as Japanese.

In most of its Western forms, Karin was originally a Swedish form of Katherine, but in English speaking countries is usually thought of as an alternate spelling for Karen.

The Japanese name Karin (花梨, かりん) means Chinese quince (Pseudocydonia sinensis), quince (Cydonia oblonga) or Burmese rosewood (Pterocarpus indicus) and is unrelated to the Western forms.

In Thailand, it is written as กา ริน and read as 'karin'. However, in Thailand it is mainly used as a male name.

== People ==
- Karin Aasma (1926–2012), Estonian-Swedish art historian
- Karin Abma (born 1951), Dutch rower
- Karin Adelmund (1949–2005), Dutch politician
- Karin Adelsköld (born 1973), Swedish comedian and television presenter
- Karin Ageman (1899–1950), Swedish artist
- Karin Ahlbäck, Finnish Scouting activist
- Karin Åhlin (1830–1899), Swedish educator
- Karin Ahrland (1931–2019), Swedish politician and diplomat
- Karin Albou (born 1968), French director
- Karin Alfredsson (born 1953), Swedish writer
- Karin Alvtegen (born 1965), Swedish writer of crime fiction
- Karin Andersen (born 1952), Norwegian politician
- Karin Ann (born 2002), Slovak singer and songwriter
- Karin Arrhenius (born 1972), Swedish screenwriter
- Karin Baal (1940–2024), German film actress
- Karin Barber (born 1949), British anthropologist and academic
- Karin Boye (1900–1941), Swedish poet and novelist
- Karin Karinna Bühler (born 1974), Swiss visual artist
- Karin Dahmen (born 1969), German physicist
- Karin Dreijer (born 1975), Swedish singer
- Karin Du Rietz (1766–1788), Swedish Royal Guard
- Karin Enke (born 1961), German speed skater
- Karin Ersdotter (1829–1902) Swedish businesswoman.
- Karin Falck (born 1932), Swedish director.
- Karin Fossum (born 1954), Norwegian writer of crime fiction
- Karin Franken, Dutch animal rights advocate working in Indonesia
- Karin Gayer (born 1969), Austrian writer
- Karin Glenmark (born 1952), Swedish singer
- Karin Graßhof (1937–2025), German jurist
- Karin Greiner (born 1967), Austrian politician
- Karin Guthke (born 1956), German diver
- Karin Haydu (born 1977), Slovak actress
- Karin Herrera (born 1968), Guatemalan politician
- Karin Illgen (born 1941), German discus thrower
- Karin Isobe (礒部 花凜; born 1994), Japanese actress
- Karin Jota (fl. 1350), Legendary Medieval Swedish female official of the court
- Karin Keller-Sutter, Swiss German politician
- Karin Kirkpatrick, Canadian politician
- Karin Kjølbro (born 1944), Faroese politician
- Karin Knapp (born 1987), Italian tennis player
- Karin Kock-Lindberg (1891–1976), Swedish politician
- Karin Krog (born 1937), Norwegian jazz vocalist
- Karin Lannby (1916–2007), Swedish actress and spy
- Karin Lenzke (born 1936), German high jumper
- Karin Liltorp (born 1972), Danish politician
- Karin Lindberg (1929–2020), Swedish gymnast
- Karin Lissel (born 1987), Swedish football defender
- Karin Lundgren (athlete) (born 1944), Swedish sprinter
- Karin Lundgren (swimmer) (1895–1977), Swedish swimmer
- Karin MacPhail, American Episcopal bishop
- Karin Månsdotter (1550–1612), Queen of Sweden
- Karin McRobert, (born 1953) Australian basketball player
- Karin Miyawaki (宮脇 花綸; born 1997), Japanese fencer
- Karin Kei Nagano (born 1998), American pianist
- Karin Ontiveros (born 1988), Mexican model and beauty queen
- Karin Petherick (1929–2009), British academic and translator of Swedish
- Karin Rask (born 1979), Estonian actress
- Karin Rodrigues (born 1971), Brazilian volleyball player
- Karin Saab (born 2001), Venezuelan footballer
- Karin Salanova (born 1975), Venezuelan politician
- Karin Schnass (born 1980), Austrian mathematician
- Karin Shifrin, Romanian/Israeli Mezzo-Soprano
- Karin Slaughter (born 1971), American crime writer
- Karin Smith (born 1955), American javelin thrower
- Karin Smyth (born 1964), British politician
- Karin Söder (1928–2015), Swedish politician
- Karin Spaink (1957–2026), Dutch journalist, writer and feminist
- Karin Stahre-Janson, Swedish ship captain
- Karin Suzuragi (鈴羅木 かりん), Japanese manga artist
- Karin Tammaru (born 1971), Estonian actress
- Karin Tammemägi (born 1975), Estonian politician
- Karin Viard (born 1966), French actress
- Karin Yrvin (born 1970), Norwegian politician
- Karin Zielinski (born 1982), Peruvian musician

== Fictional characters ==
- Karin (カリン), a character in the Dragon Ball media
- Karin (カリン), a character in the Naruto anime/manga
- Karin (果林), a character in the Fairy Fencer F game
- Karin Aoi (葵 かりん), a character in the manga series DNA²
- Karin Asaka (朝香 果林), a character in the media project Nijigasaki High School Idol Club
- Karin Hanazono (花園 花鈴), eponymous character in the manga Kamichama Karin
- Karin Kanzuki (神月 かりん), character from the video game Street Fighter Alpha 3
- Karin Koenig (カレン・ケーニッヒ), character in the game Shadow Hearts: Covenant
- Karin Miyoshi (三好 夏凛), character in anime/manga Yuki Yuna is a Hero
- Karin Kurosaki (黒崎 夏梨), character in the anime/manga Bleach
- Karin Kokubu, character in anime/manga Super Pig
- Karin Maaka (真紅 果林), protagonist of the anime/manga Chibi Vampire
- Karin Makunouchi (幕之内 花梨) or Kayla, character in anime/manga Fighting Foodons
- Karin Misono (御園 かりん), character in the game Magia Record
- Karin Saku (佐久 (in kanji form), かりん (in hiragana form), or カリン (original + katakana form), a character in Magical Trans!
- Karin Sasamori (笹森 花梨), character in the game To Heart 2
- Karin Sauer, a playable character from Fear & Hunger 2: Termina.
- Karin Kakudate (角楯 カリン), a 16-year old student from Blue Archive.

== See also ==
- Karin (disambiguation)
- Karie (name)
- Karen (disambiguation)
- Karien
- Carin
