= Caren =

Caren or Carens may refer to:

== People ==
- Caren (name), including a list of people with the name
- Caren/Karen, a supporting character from Mermaid Melody Pichi Pichi Pitch

== Places ==
- Caren Range, mountain range in British Columbia
- Caren, a district in Curacaví, Chile
- Estero Carén, a river in Chile

== Other uses ==
- CAREN (system), a virtual reality system used for rehabilitation
- Kia Carens, a compact multi-purpose vehicle
- Barbus carens, a ray-finned fish
- Caren (horse), 2016 Canadian Horse of the Year

== See also ==
- Carin
- Caryn
- Caron (disambiguation)
- Karen (disambiguation)
- Karin (disambiguation)
