= Karen (name) =

Karen (/ˈkærən/ KARR-ən) is a given name and occasional surname. In English, it is a feminine given name derived from the name Katherine.

== English ==
Karen entered the English language from Danish, where it has been a short form of "Katherine" since medieval times. It became popular in the English-speaking world in the 1940s. The name Karen was one of the top 10 names for girls born in the United States during the 1950s and 1960s, peaking as the third most popular girl's name in 1965.

Variants include Caren, Caryn, Karena, Karin, Karyn, and others.

In part due to its increasingly common derogatory use since 2017, the name has become significantly less popular in the United States in recent years. However, the name had already peaked in use and gone out of fashion prior to 2017. One recent study found that the perceived disrespect and verbal abuse they experience because of their name has had a negative impact on the mental health of women who are named Karen. Participants in the study came from a variety of racial, cultural, and economic backgrounds, reflecting the enormous, widespread popularity of the name in the Anglosphere during the mid-20th century.

== Armenian ==
In Armenia Karen (Armenian: Կարեն, IPA: [kɑˈɾɛn]) is a common masculine given name.

The masculine given name Karen derived from the Parthian name of House of Karen (or Caren), one of the seven aristocratic families of ancient Iran. Several Iranian princes named Karen are known before and after the Islamic period. The Karen house ruled the Tabaristan region of Iran, which approximately corresponds to the current provinces of Gilan state and Mazandaran.

The masculine given name Garen is a Western Armenian form of the Eastern Armenian Karen.

The masculine given name Karen was mentioned by the prominent Armenian historian Movses Khorenatsi (c. 410–490s AD; Armenian: Մովսես Խորենացի) in his book History of Armenia.

Karen can also be a surname.

== In East Asia ==
In East Asia, Karen is a feminine given name. The name can be found in Japan. It may come from 可憐 ("pretty, lovely"), 華蓮 (combining kanji meaning "flower" and "lotus or water lily") or other meanings.

== Notable people ==
=== First name ===
- Karen Aardal (born 1961), Norwegian and Dutch applied mathematician
- Karen Ackerman (born 1951), American children's author
- Karen Adam (born 1975), Scottish Politician
- Karen Aline Peliçari (born 1989), Brazilian footballer
- Karen Allen (born 1951), American actress
- Karen Alexander (disambiguation), several people
- Karen Anderson (writer) (1932–2018), American fantasy writer
- Karen Anderson (squash player) (born 1971), Jamaican squash player
- Karen Anette Anti (born 1972), Norwegian Sami politician
- Karen Angell (1732–1788), Norwegian heiress
- Karen Armstrong (born 1944), British author on comparative religion
- Karen Arthur (born 1941), American film director, producer, and actress
- Karen Austin, American actress
- Karen Dianne Baldwin (born 1963), Miss Universe 1982
- Karen Bass (writer) (born 1962), Canadian author of young adult fiction
- Karen Battaglia, American politician
- Karen Bernstein (born 1969), Canadian voice actress
- Karen Bjornson (born 1952), American model
- Karen Black (1939–2013), American actress
- Karen Blixen (1885–1962), Danish author under the pen name Isak Dinesen
- Karen Bordador (born 1992), Filipina television host and influencer
- Karen Breumsø (born 1979), Danish Paralympic swimmer
- Karen Busby (1958-2026), Canadian feminist and legal scholar
- Karen Carlson (born 1944), American actress
- Karen Carpenter (1950–1983), American singer and drummer
- Karen Cashman, American short track speed skater
- Karen Cellini (born 1958), American actress
- Karen Chen (born 1999), American figure skater
- Karen Chin, American paleontologist, coprolitologist, and taphonomist
- Karen Clark Sheard (born 1960), American gospel singer and songwriter, member of the Clark Sisters
- Karen Cockburn (born 1980), Canadian Olympic trampolinist
- Karen Connelly (born 1969), Canadian travel writer and novelist
- Karen Crouse, American journalist and author
- Karen Daley, former president of the American Nurses Association
- Karen Dalton (1937–1993), American country blues musician
- Karen David (born 1979), Canadian actress, singer, and songwriter
- Karen Davila (born 1970), Filipina newscaster and broadcast journalist
- Karen delos Reyes (born 1984), Filipina actress
- Karen Devine, American computer scientist
- Karen Donaldson (1947–2005), American Paralympic swimmer and athlete
- Karen Dotrice (born 1955), English former actress
- Karen Dunne (born 1967), American track and road cyclist
- Karen Durbin (1944–2025), American journalist, feminist, and critic
- Karen Elson (born 1979), British model and singer
- Karen Sparks Epley (born 1955), American accountant
- Karen Fairchild co-lead singer of Little Big Town
- Karen Fisher, New Zealand geographer
- Karen Fogg, British diplomat
- Karen Fralich, Canadian artist
- Karen Friedman (disambiguation), several people
- Karen Fukuhara (born 1992), American actress
- Karen Garner (died 2023), American victim of police brutality
- Karen Gillan (born 1987), Scottish actress
- Karen L. Gould (born 1948) American scholar of French-Canadian literature, president of Brooklyn College
- Karen Grassle, American actress
- Karen Gresham, American politician
- Karen Hamilton, American politician
- Karen Hampton (disambiguation), several people
- Karen Handel (born 1962), American politician
- Karen Harding (born 1991), English singer
- Karen Hassan (born 1981), Northern Irish actress
- Karen Haude, German field hockey player
- Karen Hegner, American politician
- Karen Horning (born 1966), Peruvian breaststroke swimmer
- Karen Ibasco (born 1990), Filipina physicist and beauty pageant titleholder of Miss Philippines Earth 2017
- Karen Kain (born 1951), Canadian ballerina, currently artistic director of the National Ballet of Canada
- Karen Kamon (1951–2020), American singer and actress
- Karen Keys-Gamarra, American politician from Virginia
- Karen Khachanov (born 1996), Russian professional tennis player
- Karen Kilgariff (born 1970), American comedian and podcast host
- Karen Killilea (1940–2020), subject of two books by her mother, Marie Killilea
- Karen Kingsbury (born 1963), Christian fiction author
- Karen King-Aribisala, Nigerian writer
- Karen Kohanowich, former United States Navy diver
- Karen Kong (born 1984), Malaysian singer
- Karen Kopins (born 1961), American beauty pageant winner, actress and model
- Karen Kotte (died 1509), Danish merchant
- Karen Kurreck (born 1962), American road cyclist
- Karen LaFace (born 1966), American diver
- Karen Lam, Canadian filmmaker
- Karen Lam (researcher), diabetes and obesity researcher
- Karen Lancaume (1973–2005), French pornographic actress
- Karen Lang, American mayor
- Karen Lueders, American politician
- Karen MacLeod (1958–2021), British long-distance runner
- MØ (Karen Marie Aagaard Ørsted Andersen), Danish singer
- Karen Marrongelle, American mathematics educator
- Karen Martello (born 1978), Venezuelan singer and television presenter
- Karen Matheson, Scottish folk singer
- Karen McDougal (born 1971), American model, actress and Playboy Playmate
- Karen McManus (born 1969), American young adult author
- Karen Mok (born 1970), Hong Kong actress and singer
- Karen Morrison-Comstock (born 1955), Miss USA 1974
- Karen Montell, American politician
- Karen Muenster (born 1942), American politician
- Karen Mulder (born 1970), Dutch model and singer
- Karen Muir (1952–2013), South African swimmer
- Karen Nyberg (born 1969), American astronaut
- Karen O (born 1978), American musician and lead vocalist of Yeah Yeah Yeahs
- Karen O'Leary, New Zealand comedian
- Karen O'Shannacery (born 1950), Canadian homeless advocate
- Karen Palacios, Venezuelan clarinetist
- Karen Pence (born 1957), former Second Lady of the United States
- Karen Pickering (born 1971), British swimmer
- Karen Poutasi (1949–2026), New Zealand government official
- Karen Prell (born 1959), American puppeteer and animator
- Karen Press (born 1956), South African poet
- Karen Ann Quinlan (1954–1985), central figure in an American right-to-die controversy
- Karen Reyes (born 1996), Filipina actress
- Karen Rosenberg (born 1975), Danish singer
- Karen Sheffield (born 1961), Canadian judo champion
- Karen Smith (Australian field hockey) (born 1979), Australian field hockey player
- Karen Smith (New Zealand field hockey) (born 1970), New Zealand field hockey player
- Karen Smyers (born 1961), American triathlete
- Karen Spencer, Countess Spencer, wife of Charles Spencer, 9th Earl Spencer
- Karen Strassman (born 1966), American voice actress
- Karen Taylor (comedian) (born 1976), British comedian
- Karen Elizabeth Tilley, Miss Canada 1985
- Karen Valentine (born 1947), American actress
- Karen White, English prisoner
- Karen Vega (born 2001), Oaxaqueñan Mexican fashion model
- Karen Villanueva (born 1998), Mexican rhythmic gymnast
- Karen Vogtmann (born 1949), American mathematician
- Karen Washington, American political activist and community organizer
- Karen Winkfield (born 1970), American radiation oncologist and physician-scientist
- Karen Young (1951–1991), American disco singer
- Karen Zoid (born 1987), South African rock singer

=== Surname ===
- Anna Karen (1936–2022), British actress
- James Karen (1923–2018), American actor
- Tom Karen (1926–2022), British industrial designer

== West Asian people ==
=== Armenian people ===
- Karen Abrahamyan (born 1966), Armenian politician
- Karen Aghamyan (born 1946), Armenian painter
- Karen Aleksanyan (born 1980), Armenian football midfielder
- Karen Andreasyan (born 1977), Armenian human rights defender
- Karen Asatryan (born 1974), Armenian football player
- Karen Asrian (1980–2008), Armenian chess grandmaster
- Karen Demirchyan (1932–1999), Armenian politician
- Karen Drambjan (1954–2011), Armenian-born Estonian lawyer, politician and activist
- Karen Jalavyan (born 1971), Armenian Colonel in Artsakh
- Karen Kavaleryan (born 1961), Russian musician and composer
- Karen Karapetyan (born 1963), Armenian politician and Prime minister of Armenia from 2016 to 2018
- Karen Khachanov (born 1996), Russian tennis player of Armenian descent
- Karen Khachaturian (1920–2011), Russian composer of Armenian descent
- Karen Sargsyan (conductor) (born 1952), Armenian choirmaster
- Karen Shakhnazarov (born 1952), Russian filmmaker, producer and screenwriter of Armenian descent

=== Surname ===
==== Iranian people ====
- Zarmihr Karen (died 558), Iranian nobleman and Sasanian governor of Zabulistan

== East Asian people ==
- Karen Iwata (born 1998), Japanese singer
- Karen Kong, Malaysian singer
- Karen Makishima (born 1976), Japanese politician
- Karen Miyama (born 1996), Japanese actress
- Karen Mok (born 1970), Hong Kong singer and actress
- Karen Nun-Ira (born 1991), Japanese judoka
- Karen Tanaka (born 1961), Japanese composer
- Karen Takizawa (born 1992), Japanese model, tarento and actress
- Karen Yu (born 1980), Taiwanese politician

== Fictional people ==
=== Live action ===
- Karen (The Walking Dead), a female character in the TV series The Walking Dead
- Karen Cooper Fairgate MacKenzie, on the television series Knots Landing
- Karen Davis, in the 2004 motion picture The Grudge
- Karen Filippelli, on the U.S. version of the television series The Office
- Karen Foster, fictional character on Step By Step
- Karen Hayes, on the television series 24
- Karen McDonald, on ITV soap opera Coronation Street
- Karen Mizuki, in J.A.K.Q. Dengekitai
- Karen Page, a version of the comics character in the Marvel Cinematic Universe
- Karen Rooney, in the television sitcom Liv and Maddie
- Karen Spencer, on the CBS Daytime soap opera The Bold and the Beautiful
- Karen Taylor, in the BBC soap opera EastEnders
- Chief Karen Vick, a character from the American television dramedy Psych
- Karen Walker, in the television series Will & Grace

=== Animation ===
- Karen, companion of Frosty the Snowman
- Karen Onodera from Please Twins!
- Karen Plankton, one of two main antagonists in SpongeBob SquarePants and its film series

=== Print ===
- Karen Page, a character created by Marvel Comics

== See also ==
- Karen (disambiguation)
- Caron (name)
- Garen (disambiguation)
- Karan (given name)
- Karan (surname)
- Karien
- Karen people
- Karen (slang)
- Karey (disambiguation)
