= Karan (given name) =

Karan is an Indian origin masculine given name. The name originates from the sanskrit language. Karan is pronounced as k-uh-r-uh-n.

It is also used as a variant of “Karen” in English-language feminine given name.

This name is also used as a female name in Japan by transcribing the pronunciations of 花蘭, 歌蘭, 夏蘭, 叶蘭, and 匂蘭.

== Masculine ==
The Indian name originates from Karna, one of the main protagonists of Hindu epic Mahabharata. Notable people with the name include:

- Karan (actor), Indian film actor
- Karan Aujla, Indian-Punjabi singer and lyricist
- Karan Bajaj, Indian American author
- Karan B. Rawat, Indian cinematographer
- Karan Bhatia, American attorney
- Karanvir Bohra, Indian television actor, formerly known as Manoj Bohra
- Karan Brar, American actor
- Karan Grover, Indian television actor
- Karan Higdon (born 1996), American football player
- Karan Johar, an Indian film director and producer
- Karan Jotwani, Indian television actor
- Karan Kundra, Indian television actor
- Karan Malhotra, an Indian filmmaker
- Karan Mehra, Indian television actor
- Karan Patel, Indian television actor
- Karan Rastogi (born 1986), Indian tennis player
- Karan Sharma (disambiguation)
  - Karan Sharma (cricketer), Indian cricketer
  - Karan Sharma (actor), Indian film actor
  - Karan Sharma (TV actor), Indian television actor
- Karan Singh (disambiguation)
  - Karan Singh, Indian politician
  - Karan Singh Grover, Indian television actor
- Karan Tacker, Indian television actor
- Karan Thapar, Indian television commentator and interviewer
- Karan Vohra, Indian television actor
- Karan Wahi, Indian television actor

== Feminine ==
Karan may also be an English-language feminine given name, a variant of Karen. Notable people with the name include:

- Karan Armstrong (1941–2021), American operatic soprano
- Karan Ashley, American actress
- Karan Casey, Irish singer
- Karan English, American politician
- Karan Shaner, Canadian judge

== Fictional characters ==
- Karan, a character in the Indian TV series F.I.R., portrayed by Karan Grover
- Karan Rao, a R&AW agent in the YRF Spy Universe, in Tiger Zinda Hai (2017) and Tiger 3 (2023)

== See also ==
- Karan (surname)
- Karen (name), given name and surname
