= Carin =

Carin is a given name and surname. As a given name it is a variant spelling of Karin. Notable persons with the name Carin include:

== Persons with the given name ==
- Carin Cone (1940–2025), American swimmer
- Carin du Rietz (1766–1788), Swedish soldier
- Carin Goldberg (1953–2023), American graphic artist
- Carin Göring (1888–1931), Swedish first wife of Hermann Göring
- Carin Götblad (born 1956), Swedish police commissioner
- Carin Greenberg, American television writer
- Carin Jämtin (born 1964), Swedish politician
- Carin Jennings-Gabarra (born 1965), American soccer player
- Carin Koch (born 1971), Swedish golfer
- Carin Lundberg (born 1944), Swedish politician
- Carin Månsdotter (1550–1612), Queen of Sweden
- Carin Nilsson (1904–1999), Swedish swimmer
- Carin Runeson (born 1947), Swedish politician
- Carin ter Beek (born 1970), Dutch rower

== Persons with the surname ==
- Jon Carin (born 1964), American artist and musician

== See also ==
- Carine (given name)
- Karin (given name)
- Caren (disambiguation)
- Caryn
- Karen (disambiguation)
