= Nany =

Nany may refer to:

== People with the name Nany ==
=== Given name ===
- Nany Basuki (born 1970), Indonesian tennis player
- Nany Dimata (born 1997), Belgian football player
- Nany González (born 1989), a cast member on The Real World Las Vegas (2011) and The Challenge
- Nany Peña (born 1956), Dominican actress, and comedian
- Nany People (born 1965), Brazilian comedian, actress, journalist, and former drag queen

=== Surname ===
- Djane Nany (born 1986), Venezuelan disc jockey, musician, and model

== Other ==
- La Nany, Chilean sitcom

== See also ==
- Nanny
