= Kareen =

Kareen may refer to:

- An American female name which means Pure.
- A German female name which means Pure.
- Kareen also means flower, anchor, beloved.
- A Greek variant of the female given name Karen
- Qareen, a sort of personal demon in Islam
- A type of Sidhe, a creature in Irish mythology
- An Israeli variant of the Browning Hi-Power semiautomatic pistol

== See also ==
- Karien
- Karin (disambiguation)
