= Karren (name) =

Karren is a given name and surname, probably a variant of the name Karen. Notable people with the name include:

- Thomas Karren (1810–1876), Early American pioneer (Male)
- Billy Karren (born 1965), American musician (Male)
- Karren Brady (born 1969), British businesswoman and writer (Female)

== See also ==
- Karen (disambiguation)
- Karien
- Karre
