= Shaner =

Shaner is a surname. Notable people with the surname include:

- Christie Shaner (born 1984), American soccer defender
- James Shaner (1936–2012), American politician
- Karan Shaner, Canadian judge
- Lee Shaner (born 1981), better known by his stage name Intuition, American rapper
- Tom Shaner, American songwriter, musician, performer, director, and writer
- Wally Shaner (1900–1992), American baseball player
