= Keren (given name) =

Keren (Hebrew: קֶרֶן) is Hebrew for "ray" (of light) and can be used as both a given name and a surname. It is also a variant of the name Karen.

Notable people named Keren include:

== Arts ==
=== Music ===
- Keren Ann (born 1974), singer-songwriter based in Paris
- Keren DeBerg, American singer-songwriter
- Keren Hadar, crossover soprano from Israel
- Keren Peles (born 1979), Israeli singer-songwriter and a pianist
- Keren Woodward (born 1961), English pop singer and songwriter

=== Other arts ===
- Keren Craig (born 1976), English-Swiss fashion designer
- Keren Cytter (born 1977), Israeli visual artist and writer
- Keren Mor (born 1964), Israeli actress and comedian
- Keren Tzur (born 1974), Israeli actress
- Keren Yedaya (born 1972), Israeli filmmaker

== Sports ==
- Keren Barratt (born 1946), English former football referee
- Keren Leibovitch (born 1973), Israeli champion Paralympic swimmer
- Keren Regal (born 1977), Israeli former Olympic swimmer
- Keren Shlomo (born 1988), Israeli tennis player
- Keren Siebner (born 1990), Israeli Olympic swimmer
- Keren Ugle (born 1979), Australian rules footballer
- Keren Boadu (born 2008), Ghana a track runner

== Other people ==
- Keren Elazari (born 1980), Israeli-born cyber security analyst and senior researcher
- Keren Everett, American-born linguist and Christian missionary
- Keren Neubach (born 1970), Israeli journalist, television presenter, and radio presenter
- Keren Rice (born 1949), Canadian linguist
- Keren Riquelme, Puerto Rican politician
- Keren Tendler (died 2006), Israeli soldier

== Surname ==
- Hanan Keren (born 1952), Israeli basketball player

== See also ==
- Keren (disambiguation)
