= Garen =

Garen is a rare Western Armenian given name.

== People ==
- Garen Bloch (1978–2018), South African cyclist
- Garen Boyajian (born 1987), Canadian actor
- Garen Casey, Australian 1990s rugby league footballer
- Garen Ewing (born 1969), English illustrator, designer and comic creator
- Alan Garen (1926–2022), American geneticist and biologist
- Jean-Pierre Garen (1932–2004), French physician and novelist
- John E. Garen, American economist
- Micah Garen (born 1968), American photographer, documentary filmmaker and writer

== Other uses ==
- House of Garen, the ruling hereditary dynasty of the Ajuran Sultanate
- Garen, Minnesota, United States, an abandoned townsite

== See also ==
- Karen (disambiguation)
- Karen (name)
