= Kayin =

Kayin can refer to:

- Kayin State, an administrative division of Myanmar (Burma)
- Kayin or Karen people, a minority ethnic group in Myanmar
- Kayin, Iran, a village in Kerman Province, Iran
- alternative spelling for Cain
- Kayin Amoh, a character in the Battle Arena Toshinden fighting game series
- Kayin, alias of the creator of the indie video game I Wanna Be The Guy
- Kayin Lee (born 2004), American football player

== See also ==
- Karen (disambiguation)
