= Karan (surname) =

Karan is the surname of the following notable people:

- Abraar Karan, American global health physician and writer
- Amara Karan (born 1984), British actress
- Chris Karan (born 1939), Australian jazz drummer
- Dejan Karan (born 1988), Serbian football player
- Donna Karan (born 1948), American fashion designer
- Goran Karan (born 1964), Croatian vocalist
- Guilherme Karan (1957–2016), Brazilian actor
- Ian Karan (born 1939), Tamil German businessman and politician
- Jajati Karan (born 1973), Indian journalist
- Marija Karan (born 1982), Serbian actress
- Mark Karan (born 1955), American guitarist and singer
- Panos Karan (born 1982), British classical pianist, conductor and composer
- Pawan Karan (born 1964), Indian poet, columnist, editor and analyst
- Ram Karan, Indian politician
- Saška Karan (born 1964), Serbian singer
- Siniša Karan (born 1962), Bosnian Serbian politician
- Ümit Karan (born 1976), Turkish football manager and player

== See also ==
- Karan (given name)
- Karen (name), given name and surname
