= List of Scroll and Key members =

Yale University society members

Scroll and Key is a secret society at Yale University in New Haven, Connecticut. It was established in 1841. Following are some of the notable members of Scroll and Key.

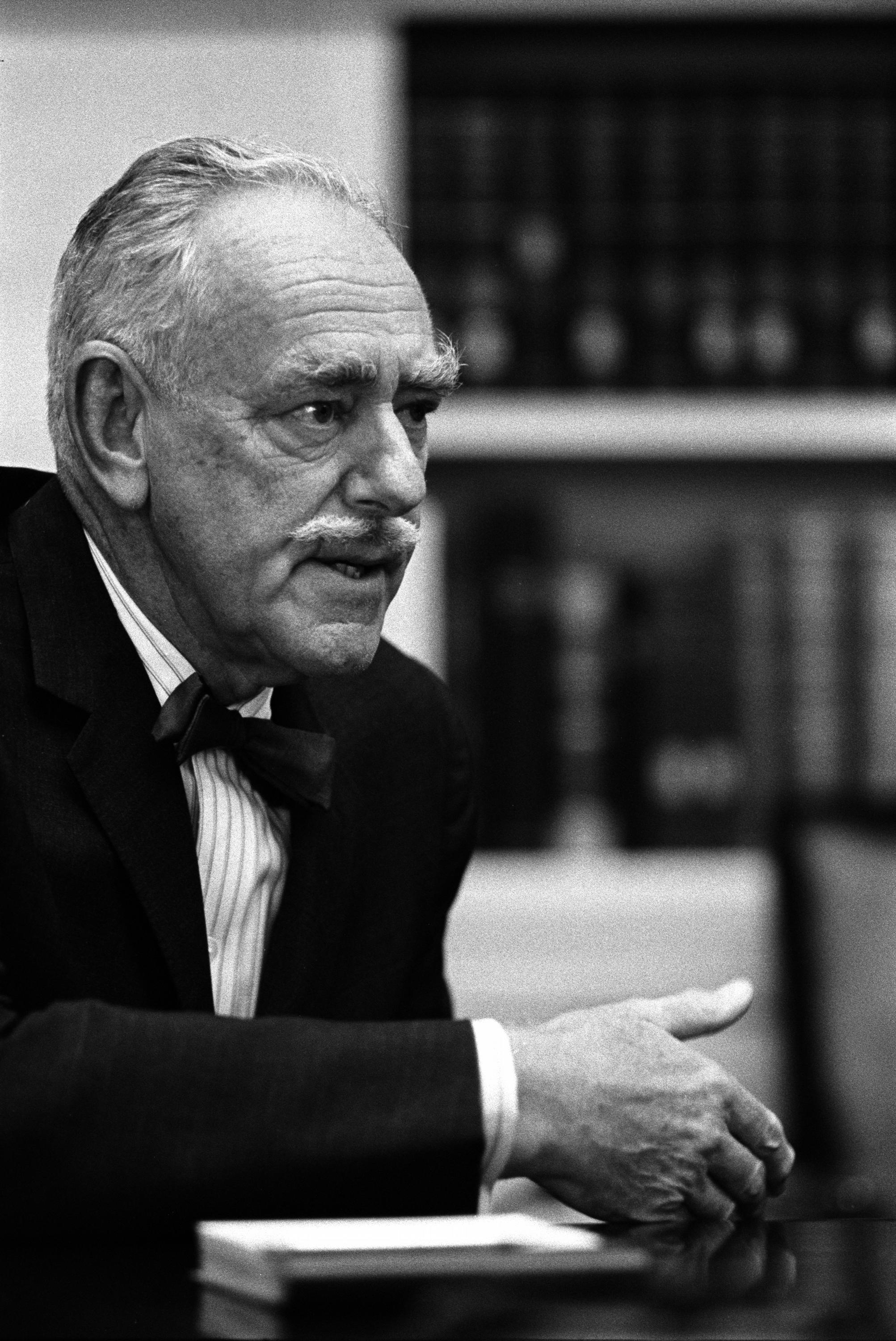
Dean Acheson

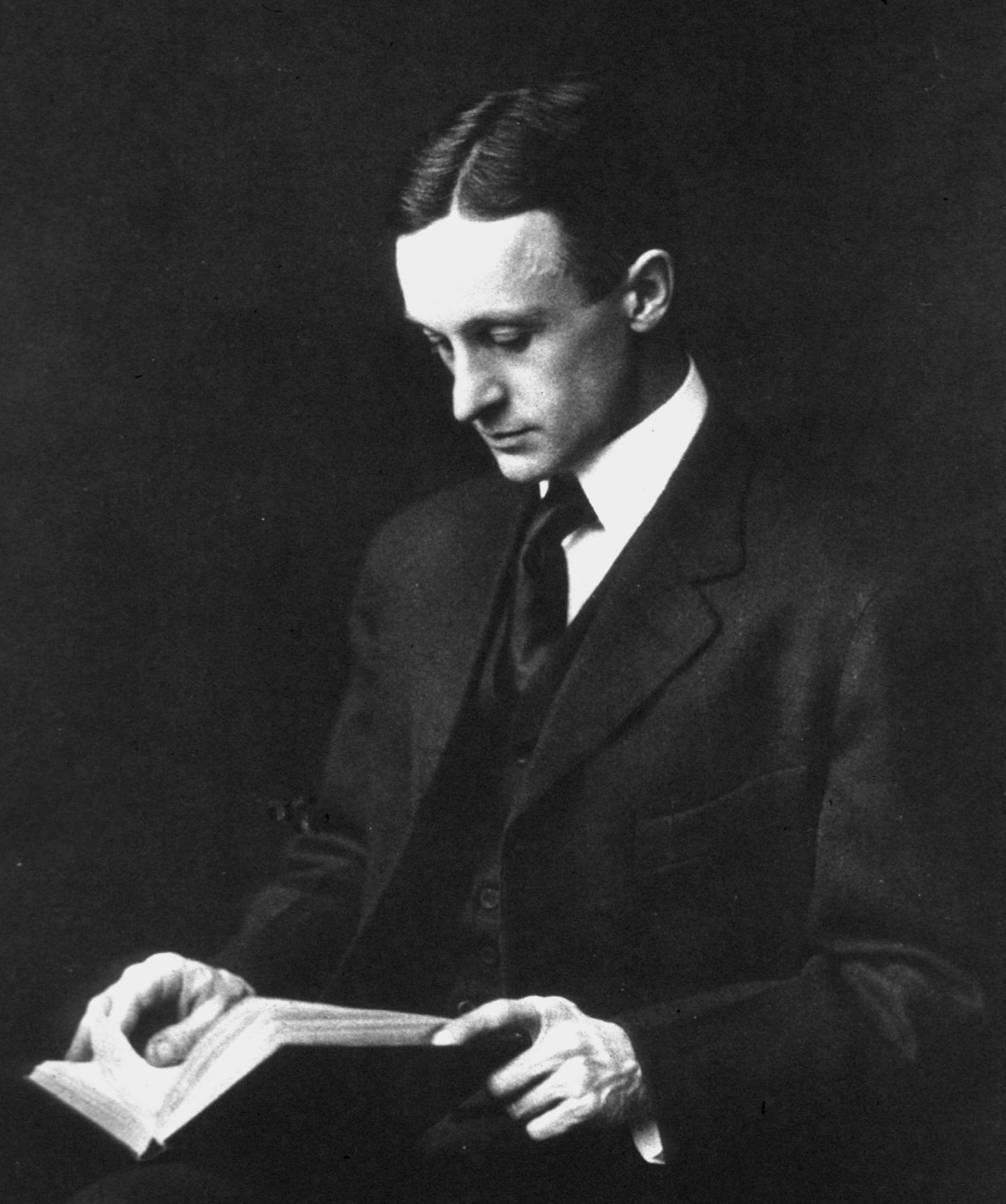
Harvey Cushing

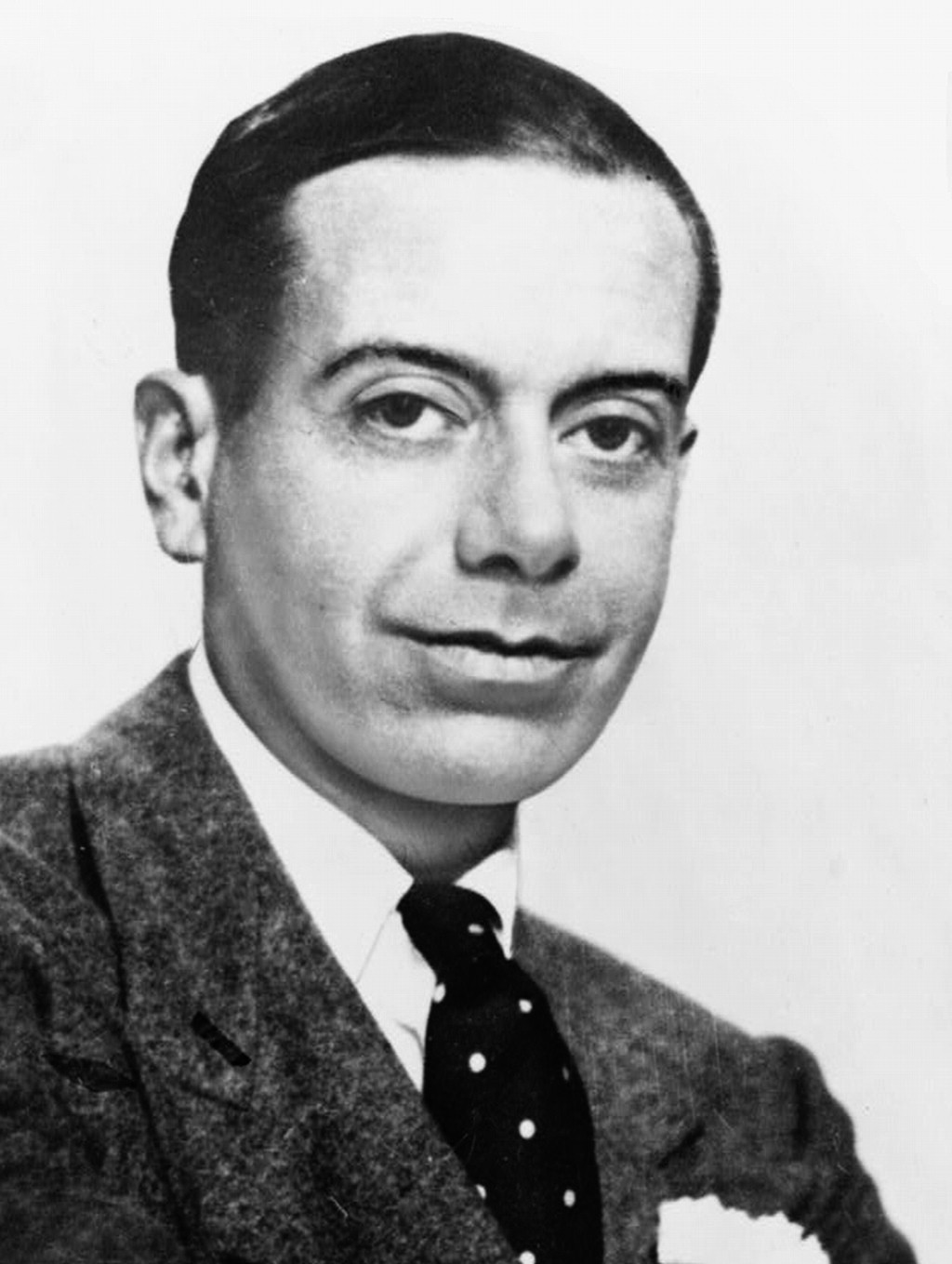
Cole Porter

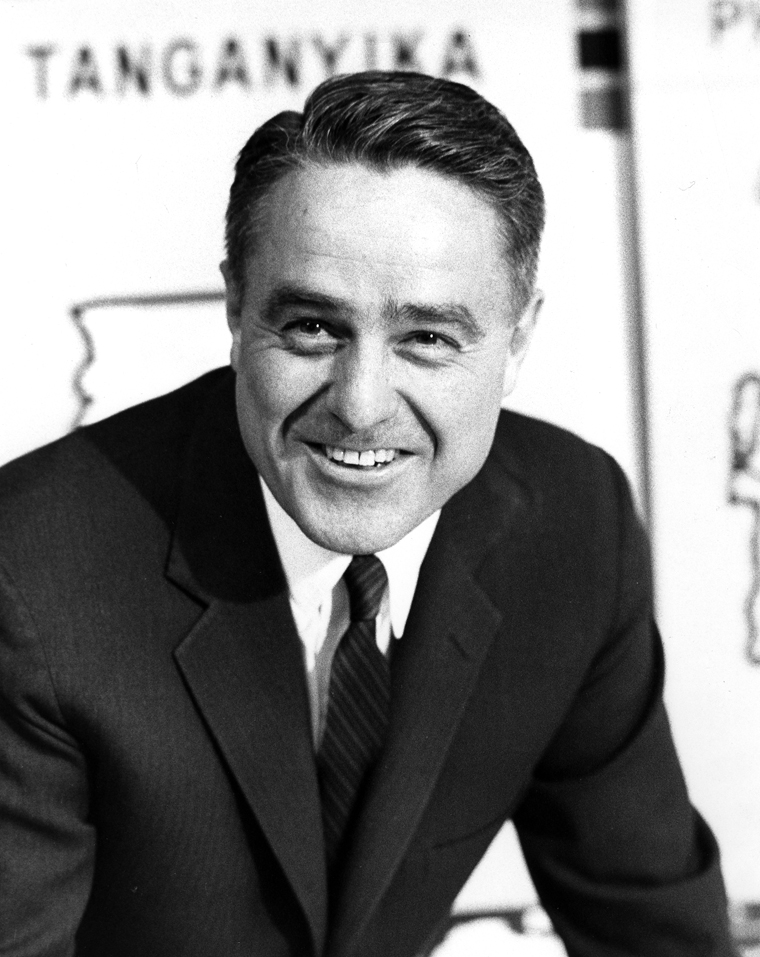
Sargent Shriver

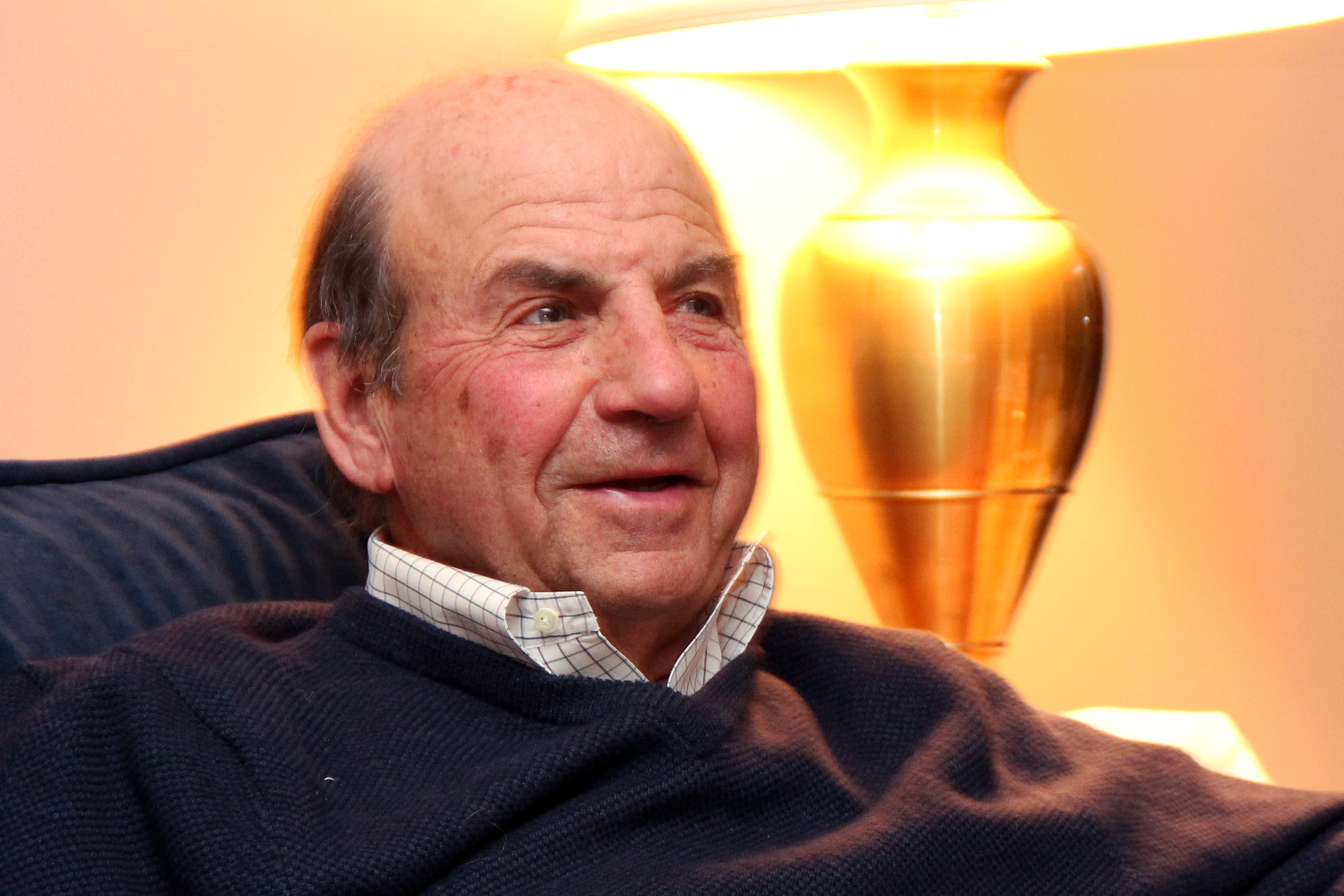
Calvin Trillin

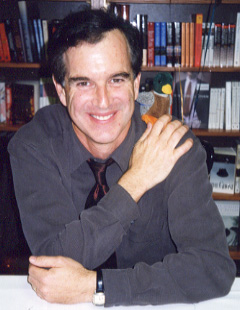
Garry Trudeau

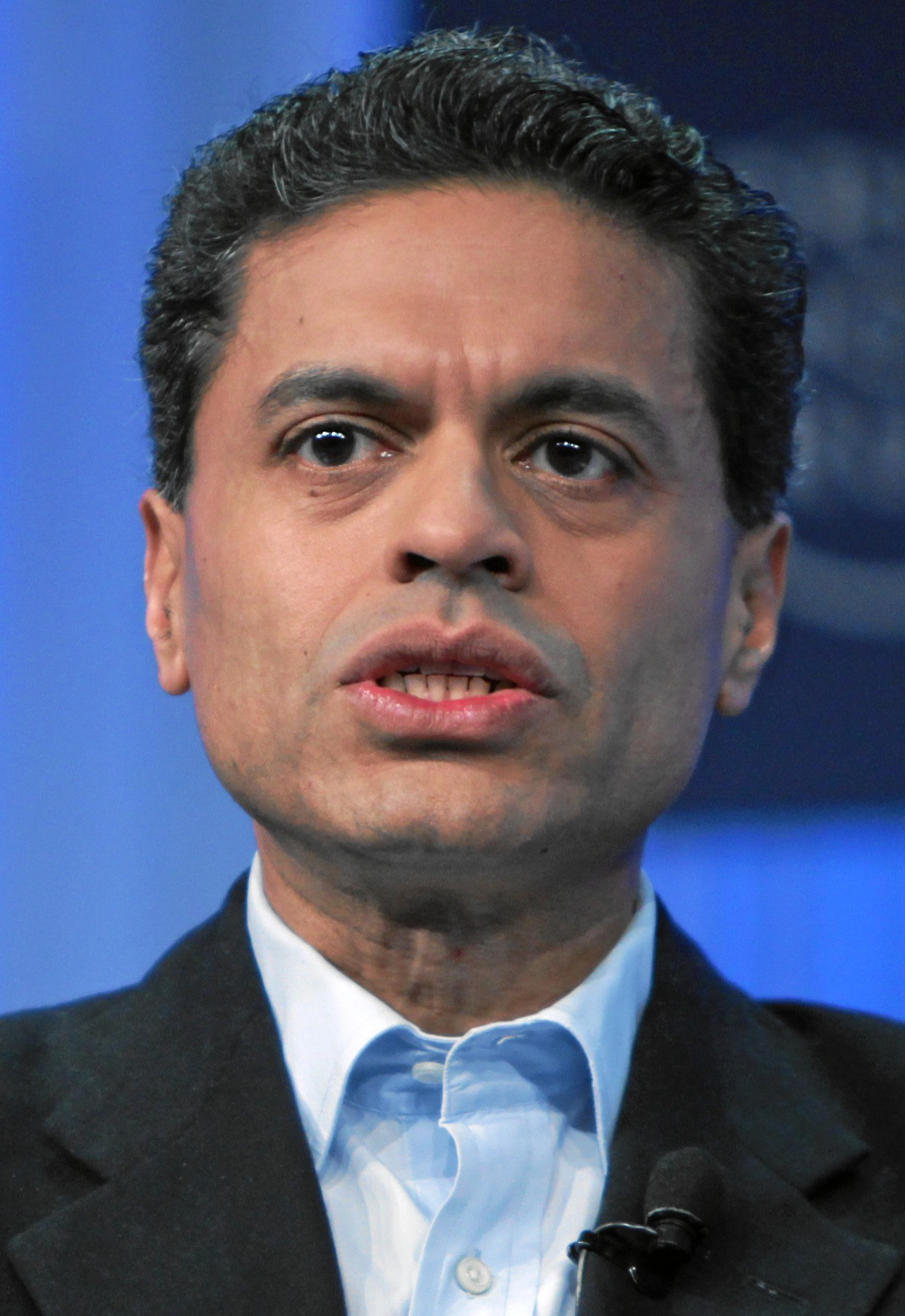
Fareed Zakaria

Name	Yale class	Notability	Ref.
Dean Acheson	1915	United States Secretary of State	
James C. Auchincloss	1908	United States House of Representatives, New York Stock Exchange governor	
Tracy Barnes	1933	Senior CIA official during the Cold War	
Peter Beard	1961	Photographer	
Dunbar Bostwick	1932	competitive horseman, who competed in polo and Harness racing	
Benjamin Brewster	1929	Director of Standard Oil Co. of New Jersey (later Exxon)	
William C. Bullitt	1912	U.S. Ambassador to France, U.S. Ambassador to the Soviet Union	
Leonard Case Jr.	1842	Founder of Case School of Applied Science	
Wayne Chatfield-Taylor	1916	Undersecretary of Commerce; Assistant Secretary of the Treasury	
Calvin G. Child	1855	United States Attorney for the District of Connecticut	
Gilbert Colgate	1883	President and chairman of Colgate & Company	
H. Page Cross	1932	Architect	
Harvey Cushing	1891	Neurosurgeon, considered father of brain surgery	
John Dalzell	1865	United States House of Representatives	
Edward Salisbury Dana	1870	mineralogist and professor of physics at Yale University	
Henry deForest	1876	Southern Pacific Railroad	
William Adams Delano	1895	Architect who designed many of Yale's buildings	
Frederick B. Dent	1944	United States Secretary of Commerce	
Richardson Dilworth	1921	Mayor of Philadelphia	
Peter H. Dominick	1937	United States Senate, United States Secretary of Commerce, U.S. Ambassador to Switzerland	
Fred Dubois	1872	United States Senate	
John Enders	1919	Nobel Prize in Physiology or Medicine	
Thomas Enders	1953	U.S. Ambassador to Spain, U.S. Ambassador to the European Union, U.S. Ambassador to Canada	
Cory Finley	2011	Film director	
Willa Fitzgerald	2013	Actress	
A. Bartlett Giamatti	1960	Yale University president; National League president, MLB commissioner	
Randall L. Gibson	1853	United States Senate, Confederate brigadier-general, and president of Tulane University	
George Bird Grinnell	1870	Anthropologist, historian, naturalist, and writer	
Raymond R. Guest	1931	U.S. Ambassador to Ireland; special assistant to United States Secretary of Defense	
Carter Harrison III	1845	United States House of Representatives, Mayor of Chicago	
William Hawks	1923	Film producer	
Philip B. Heymann	1954	Watergate special prosecutor, deputy U.S. attorney general; professor at Harvard Law School	
George Roy Hill	1943	Academy Award for Directing The Sting	
Zora Howard	2014	Actress and writer	
Brewster Jennings	1920	Founder and president of the Socony Mobil Oil Company Standard Oil of New York	
Abraar Karan	2011	Infectious disease doctor	
Seymour H. Knox	1920	co-founder of F. W. Woolworth Company	
Rick E. Lawrence	1977	Associate justice of the Maine Supreme Judicial Court	
Johan Lenox	2011	Composer and songwriter	
Charlton Thomas Lewis	1853	Lexicographer	
John Vliet Lindsay	1944	Mayor of New York City, United States House of Representatives	
Dahlia Lithwick	1990	editor at Newsweek and Slate	
Maynard Mack	1964	Literary critic; Yale English professor	
Joseph Medill McCormick	1900	United States Senate and publisher of the Chicago Tribune	
Robert R. McCormick	1903	owner and publisher of the Chicago Tribune; lawyer who co-founded Kirkland & Ellis	
Donald R. McLennan	1931	founder and chairman of the insurance brokerage firm Marsh McLennan	
Paul Mellon	1929	Philanthropist and thoroughbred racehorse breeder	
Timothy Mellon	1964	businessman and grandson of Andrew Mellon	
Cord Meyer, Jr.	1943	Central Intelligence Agency; United World Federalists	
Newbold Morris	1925	Parks Commissioner of New York City, president of the New York City Council	
Robert D. Orr	1940	Governor of Indiana; U.S. Ambassador to Singapore	
Herbert Parsons	1890	United States House of Representatives	
Joseph M. Patterson	1901	Founder of the New York Daily News; manager of the Chicago Tribune	
Tom Perriello	1996	United States House of Representatives; executive director of the Open Society Foundation	
Michael Grace Phipps		champion polo player and owner/breeder of racehorses	
Stone Phillips	1977	Dateline NBC	
Frank Polk	1894	United States Secretary of State, partner in Davis Polk & Wardwell	
Cole Porter	1913	Entertainer and songwriter	
John Addison Porter	1842	professor of chemistry and physician	
Frederic A. Potts	1926	New Jersey Senate, chairman of Philadelphia National Bank	
Mortimer R. Proctor	1912	Governor of Vermont	
Jeannie Rhee	1994	Deputy Assistant Attorney General	
Dickinson W. Richards	1917	Nobel Prize in Physiology or Medicine	
Alexandra Robbins	1998	Journalist and author	
James Stillman Rockefeller	1924	Olympic gold medalist for rowing, banker	
James Gamble Rogers	1889	Architect, designed many of Yale's buildings	
Gideon Rose	1985	Editor of Foreign Affairs	
Theodore Runyon	1842	Envoy and U.S. Ambassador to Germany	
William Nelson Runyon	1892	Acting Governor of New Jersey	
Ari Shapiro	2000	Co-host of All Things Considered for National Public Radio	
Huntington D. Sheldon	1925	Central Intelligence Agency; president of the Petroleum Corporation of America	
Lewis Sheldon	1896	Paris Peace Conference, Olympic gold medalist	
Ethan A. H. Shepley	1918	Chancellor of Washington University in St. Louis	
George Shiras Jr.	1853	U.S. Supreme Court Justice	
Sargent Shriver	1938	U.S. Ambassador to France, first director of the Peace Corps	
Brinley D. Sleight	1858	New York State Assembly, newspaper editor	
Benjamin Spock	1925	Olympic gold medalist	
Homer Sprague	1852	President of the University of North Dakota	
Roscoe S. Suddarth	1956	President of the Middle East Institute; U.S. Ambassador to Jordan	
Charles Henry Tenney	1933	Judge of the United States District Court for the Southern District of New York	
Calvin Trillin	1957	Writer	
Garry Trudeau	1970	Doonesbury cartoonist	
Mark Twain	Honorary	author and humorist	
Joseph Twichell	1859	writer and Congregational minister	
Cyrus Vance	1939	United States Secretary of State; United States Secretary of the Army; chairman of the Federal Reserve Bank of New York	
Cornelius Vanderbilt III	1895	Brigadier general in the U.S. Army during the World War I	
Tyler Varga	2015	Professional football player	
George Edgar Vincent	1885	President of the University of Minnesota; president of the Rockefeller Foundation	
Robert F. Wagner, Jr.	1933	Mayor of New York City	
Allen Wardwell	1895	lawyer and parner of Davis Polk & Wardwell	
John Hay Whitney	1926	U.S. Ambassador to the United Kingdom, publisher of New York Herald Tribune	
Fareed Zakaria	1986	journalist, political commentator, editor, and author	
Warren Zimmermann	1956	U.S. Ambassador to Yugoslavia	
