= Caryn =

Caryn is a given name. Notable persons with that name include:

- Caryn Johnson (born 1955), better known by her stage name Whoopi Goldberg, African-American comedian and actress
- Caryn Kadavy (born 1967), American figure skater
- Caryn Mower (born 1965), American actress, wrestler, and stunt performer
- Caryn Navy (born 1953), American mathematician and computer scientist
- Caryn Richman, American actress

== See also ==
- Caren (disambiguation)
- Carin
- Karen (disambiguation)
- Karin (disambiguation)
