= Karin Lundgren =

Karin Lundgren is the name of

- Karin Lundgren (swimmer) (1895–1977), Swedish freestyle swimmer
- Karin Lundgren (athlete) (born 1944), Swedish sprinter
