= Karien =

Karien is an Afrikaans and a Dutch feminine given name. Notable people known by this name include the following:

- Karien Robbers (born 1993), a Dutch rower.
- Karien van Gennip, nickname of Catharina Elisabeth Godefrida van Gennip (born 1968), a Dutch politician.

== See also ==
- Kamień (disambiguation)
- Karen (name)
- Karie (name)
- Kariel
- Karin (given name)
- Karine
- Karmen (name)
- Karren (name)
- Kareen (disambiguation)
