= Karan Singh (disambiguation) =

Karan Singh may refer to:

- Karan Singh (born 1931), Maharaja and governor of Jammu and Kashmir, leader of Indian National Congress
- Karan Singh II (1584–1628), Maharana of Mewar
- Karan Singh Grover (born 1982), Indian actor and model
- Karan Singh Tanwar, Indian politician of Bharatiya Janata Party
- Karan Singh Thakral, entrepreneur in Singapore and Executive Director of Thakral Group
- Karan Singh Yadav (born 1945), Indian politician of Indian National Congress
- Khem Karan Singh, general of the Indian Army
- Karan Singh (Chhabra), Indian politician of Indian National Congress
- K. C. Singh Baba, Indian politician of Indian National Congress
- Karan Singh (magician), Indian magician
- Karan Singh (tennis) (born 2003), Indian tennis player
- Karan Singh, titular character of the 1995 Indian film Karan Arjun, portrayed by Salman Khan
- Karan Singh, a fictional character in the 1995 Indian film Maidan-E-Jung, portrayed by Akshay Kumar
- Karan Singh, a fictional police officer in the 2001 Indian film Farz, portrayed by Sunny Deol
- Karan Singh, a fictional character in the 2004 Indian film Ek Hasina Thi, portrayed by Saif Ali Khan
