= Motek =

Motek Entertainment
- Company type: Private
- Industry: CGI animation, motion pictures, motion capture
- Founded: 1993
- Headquarters: Amsterdam, Netherlands
- Key people: Michiel Westermann, CEO; Oshri Even-Zohar, CTO; Jasper Brekelmans, Technical Director; Jolande Junte, Operations Manager
- Website: motekentertainment.com

Motek Entertainment BV is an animation, motion capture, format development and production studio specializing in creation and production work for features, commercials, television, games, virtual and augmented media. Motek is based in Amsterdam, Netherlands.

== History ==
The company is a subsidiary of Motek BV and was founded in The Netherlands by Oshri Even-Zohar as Lamalo BV in 1993. It became Motek BV with the inclusion of private investors in 1996. The company's core business lines: Medical, Simulation and Entertainment grew more independent and in 2004 the separate companies Motek Entertainment BV and Motek Medical BV were formed.

== About ==
Motek operates a performance capture studio in Amsterdam, and was formerly a partner with the Noordelijk Hogeschool Leeuwarden's motion capture studio in the Gameship initiative. The studio is equipped with Vicon T-Series cameras. Motek is known for being highly innovative in other fields as well, such as medicine. Their immersive virtual-reality medical system, named CAREN, has been put to use for clinical and research purposes by hospitals worldwide.

== Projects ==
Television series produced include over 400 episodes of Cafe de Wereld, an animated satire program for IDTV and VARA. The show aired on VARA's programs VARA Live, VARA Laat and De Wereld Draait Door, from 2002 to 2007.

Motek is the producer and production studio of Efteling's animated series Sprookjesboom. Based on motion capture performance, Sprookjesboom is similar in theme to DreamWorks' Shrek. It tells the story of the characters that live in the Fairy Tale Forest, including Cinderella, Little Red Riding Hood, and Tom Thumb. The show airs daily in the Netherlands on TROS and in Belgium on Ketnet. Sprookjesboom is currently in its fourth season of production, which will be broadcast in late 2009. Episodes in German, French and English are also in production.

Motek did motion-capture work on the Snickers "Don't Stop" television advertisements by Impact/BBDO. The advertisements achieved a top ranking on Adcritic.com in 2007, and received a Special Mention at The Loerie Awards for that year.

== Clients ==
- BBC
- Coca-Cola
- Dreamcatcher Interactive
- Efteling
- Geesink Studios
- Grendel Games
- Guerrilla Games
- Heineken
- Holland Casino
- IDTV
- INDG
- Mars, Incorporated
- Microsoft
- Midway
- MTV
- New Line Cinema,
- Philips
- Psygnosis
- Red Storm Entertainment
- Rijksmuseum
- Sega
- Sirius Games
- Sony
- Sony Computer Entertainment
- Streamline Studios
- Thales
- TMF
- TU Delft
- US Army
- VARA

== Motek Medical ==
Motek Medical specializes in creation, design and implementation of new technologies for the medical markets, specifically focusing on early diagnostics, rehabilitation, motor training and research. Motek Medical's flagship product is the CAREN system, an immersive virtual reality (VR) system, using motion capture systems for use in clinical and research settings.
