= Karen Martello =

Venezuelan singer and television presenter

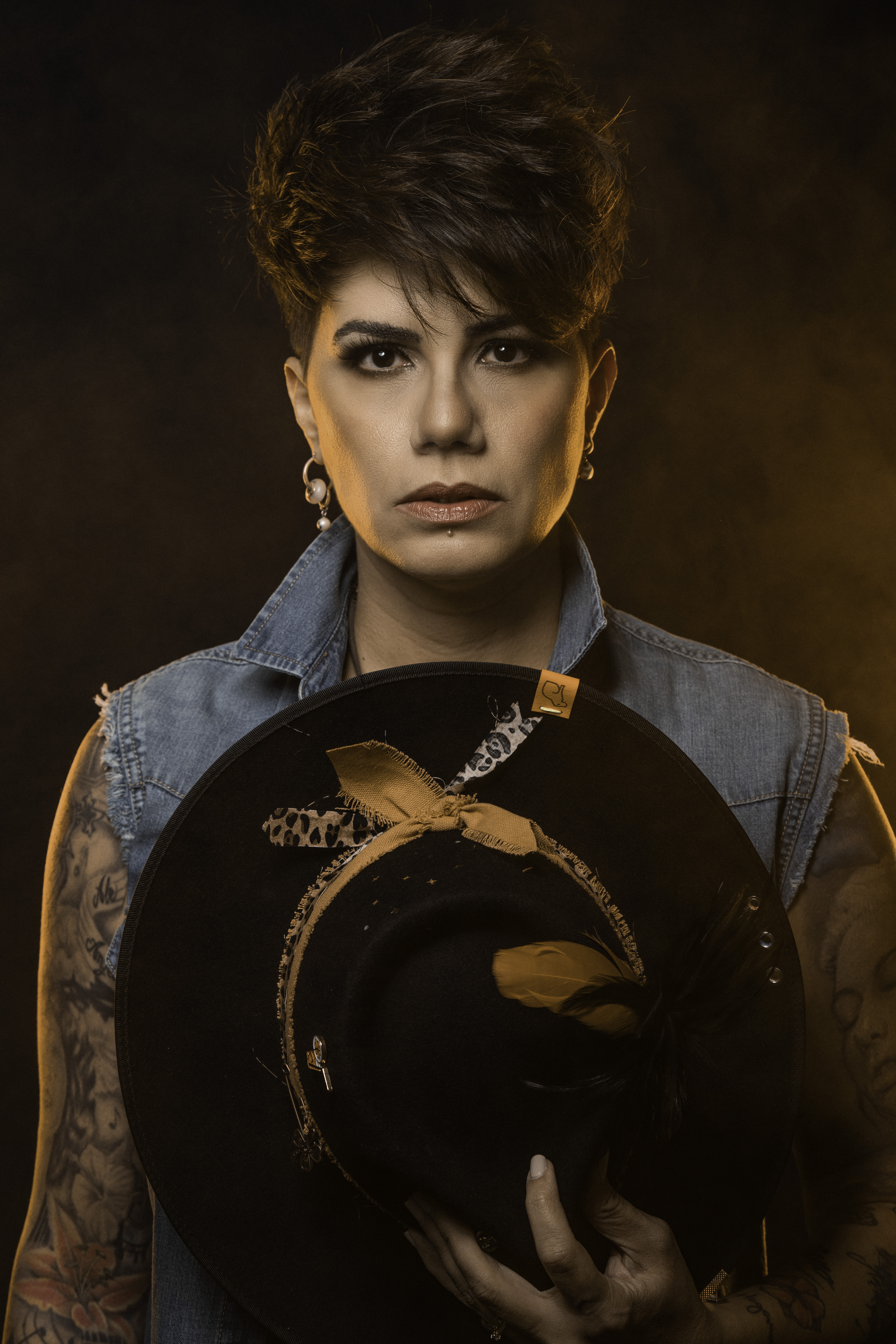
- Martello in 2022
- Born: 1 February 1978 (age 48); Cumaná, Venezuela
- Occupations: singer; television presenter
- Spouse: Brenda Rovero (m. 2015; sep. 2019)

Karen Martello (born 1 February 1978) is a Venezuelan singer and television presenter.

== Biography ==
Martello was born in Cumaná and grew up in Maracaibo. She studied at the Rafael Belloso Chacín University, although she abandoned her studies to dedicate herself to music. Her references include Celia Cruz and Marc Anthony. Martello's voice is a contralto, which is uncommon among women.

At the age of seventeen she won the First Pan American Voice Festival. In 2016, along with Vanessa Senior, she made a video for an original song by Vanesa Martín, No te pude retener. In 2019, she starred in the musical play La verdadera historia de Pedro Navaja, being the first woman to play the role of El Lince de la Barandilla.

In 2021, she participated in the film Mírame así by Héctor Márquez. She was guest actress in the play Monólogos de la Vagina with Gabriela Spanic and Susana Pérez. On November 18, 2022 she premiered with Free Cover in Homenaje a Diomedez Díaz.

Martello has hosted the television program La buena onda aimed primarily at Latin American audiences in the United States on TVV Network.

== Personal life ==
Martello was the first Venezuelan artist to get married in Florida after the law approving same-sex marriage went into effect on 6 January 2015. She married businesswoman Brenda Rovero. After an in vitro fertilization treatment in Panama, Rovero became pregnant and they became mothers of two twins. They separated in 2019.
