= Kerens =

Kerens may refer to:

- Kerens, Texas, a city in Navarro County, Texas, United States
- Kerens, West Virginia
- Richard C. Kerens (1842-1916), an American politician and diplomat

== See also ==
- Keren (disambiguation)
