= Freddy Beras-Goico =

Dominican Republic actor

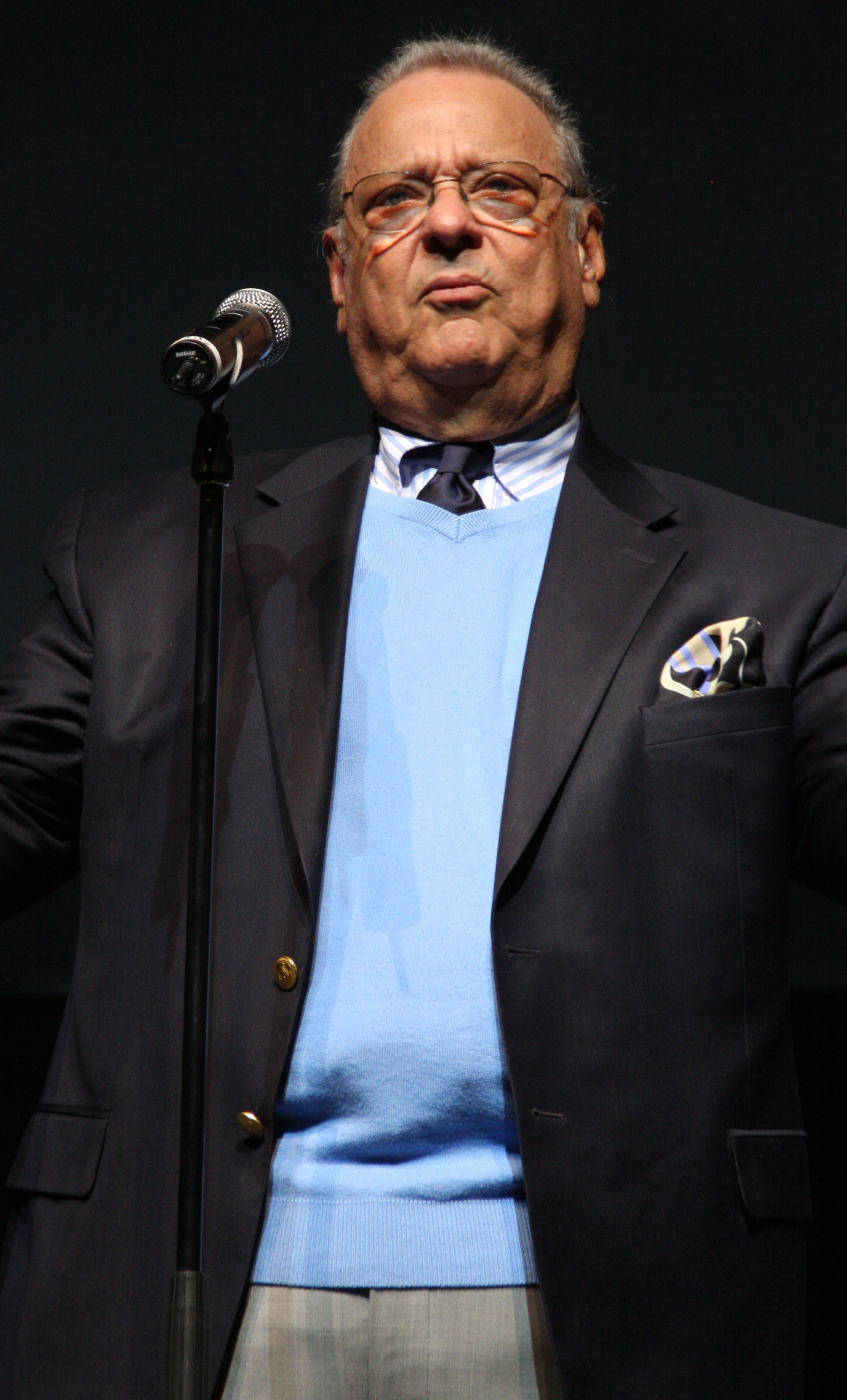
- Beras-Goico in 2010
- Born: Freddy Reinaldo Antonio Beras-Goico; November 21, 1940; Santa Lucía, El Seibo, Dominican Republic
- Died: November 18, 2010 (aged 69); New York City, New York, U.S.
- Occupations: Comedian; TV presenter; writer
- Years active: 1958–2010

Freddy Reinaldo Antonio Beras-Goico (November 21, 1940 – November 18, 2010), popularly known as "Freddy Beras" or just "Beras-Goico", was a Dominican comedian, TV presenter, writer and media personality for over 30 years. He hosted the TV show El Gordo de La Semana and he was a staple of primetime (and late night) TV. He was one of the most recognized personalities in the Dominican Republic.

== Biography ==
During the 1950s, his family fled the Dominican Republic due to the brutal regime of the Trujillo dictatorship and settled in Colombia, where he spent several years before returning to his homeland. These experiences would shape his comedic style, making him a well-known entertainer for years to come. He was also tortured by the dictatorship of Rafael Trujillo.

== Career ==
Early in his career Beras-Goico's comedic style was mainly based on sketch comedy vignettes in several daytime TV shows, later moving on to having his own personal show, El Gordo De La Semana (lit. The Fat Guy of The Week), which matured into a successful TV variety show. The show's roster of comedians and personalities included: Cuquín Victoria, Milton Peláez, Roberto Salcedo, Nany Peña, Felipe Polanco, and others.

== Personal life and family ==
The origin of Goico (his mother's family name) is Serbian, originally spelled as Goicovich (Gojković/Гојковић). By his mother he also had French and Russian ancestry.

Beras Goico married twice, first to the singer Luchy Vicioso, and then to his now widow Pilar Mejía. He had several children. He was nephew of the archbishop of Santo Domingo, Cardinal Octavio Beras; and cousin of Spanish-language television star Charytín Goyco.

In his late years, he converted to Evangelicalism.

== Career ==
Beras Goico returned to the Dominican Republic in the sixties. He started his career working as cameraman. Then in advertising but was always linked to television. Many times, Beras-Goico and the crew would laugh themselves to tears.

He began creating comedic shows for radio and TV, and met many friends that became, along with him, the best comedy team of Dominican television: Felipe Polanco, Cuquin Victoria, Cecilia Garcia, Milton Pelaez, Nany Peña, Kenny Grullón, and many more. During most comedy sketches, Beras-Goico and his actors were rarely able to stifle their laughter. Sometimes, Beras-Goico's laughter would become so contagious, that soon the entire cast and crew would start shaking in hysterical attempts to control their own laughter.

He also created his own weekly show, El Gordo de la Semana and Punto Final, a late night TV show.

Beras Goico was well known for his philanthropic work, especially for providing medical assistance to poor Dominicans. Recently, he won the Casandra Award for best actor, for his role in Victor/Victoria, and hosted the nightly show "Con Freddy y Punto", where he shared host duties with "Boruga" and Pamela Sued, the wife of his son Giancarlo.

== Death ==
Beras Goico died at Mount Sinai Hospital in New York City after battling pancreatic cancer, just three days before his 70th birthday. Before his death, Several rumours about his death appeared, his death was confirmed by the wife of his son Giancarlo Beras-Goico, on November 18, 2010, at 4:30 am and by his son later on his Twitter account.

== Legacy ==
A metro station in Santo Domingo is named after him. The Plaza de las Américas at West 175th St between Broadway and Wadsworth, in Washington Heights, upper Manhattan neighborhood with a large Dominican population (known as "Little Quisqueya" or "Little DR", is also named after him, "Freddy Beras-Goico Way."
