= Keren =

Keren may refer to:

== Places ==
=== Inhabited places ===
- Keren, Eritrea, a city in Eritrea, formerly called Cheren
- Keren subregion, Anseba region, Eritrea

=== Other places ===
- House of Keren, a historical house in Taganrog, Rostov Oblast, Russia
- Keren, a crater on Mars

== Other uses ==
- Battle of Keren, part of the East African Campaign in World War II
- Keren (given name)
- Keren (kabuki), Kabuki stagecraft
- Keren-happuch, the youngest daughter of Job (biblical figure)
- Keren, a composition for solo trombone by Greek composer Iannis Xenakis
- Keren Kayemet, or the Jewish National Fund

== See also ==
- Kerens (disambiguation)
