= Sprookjesboom =

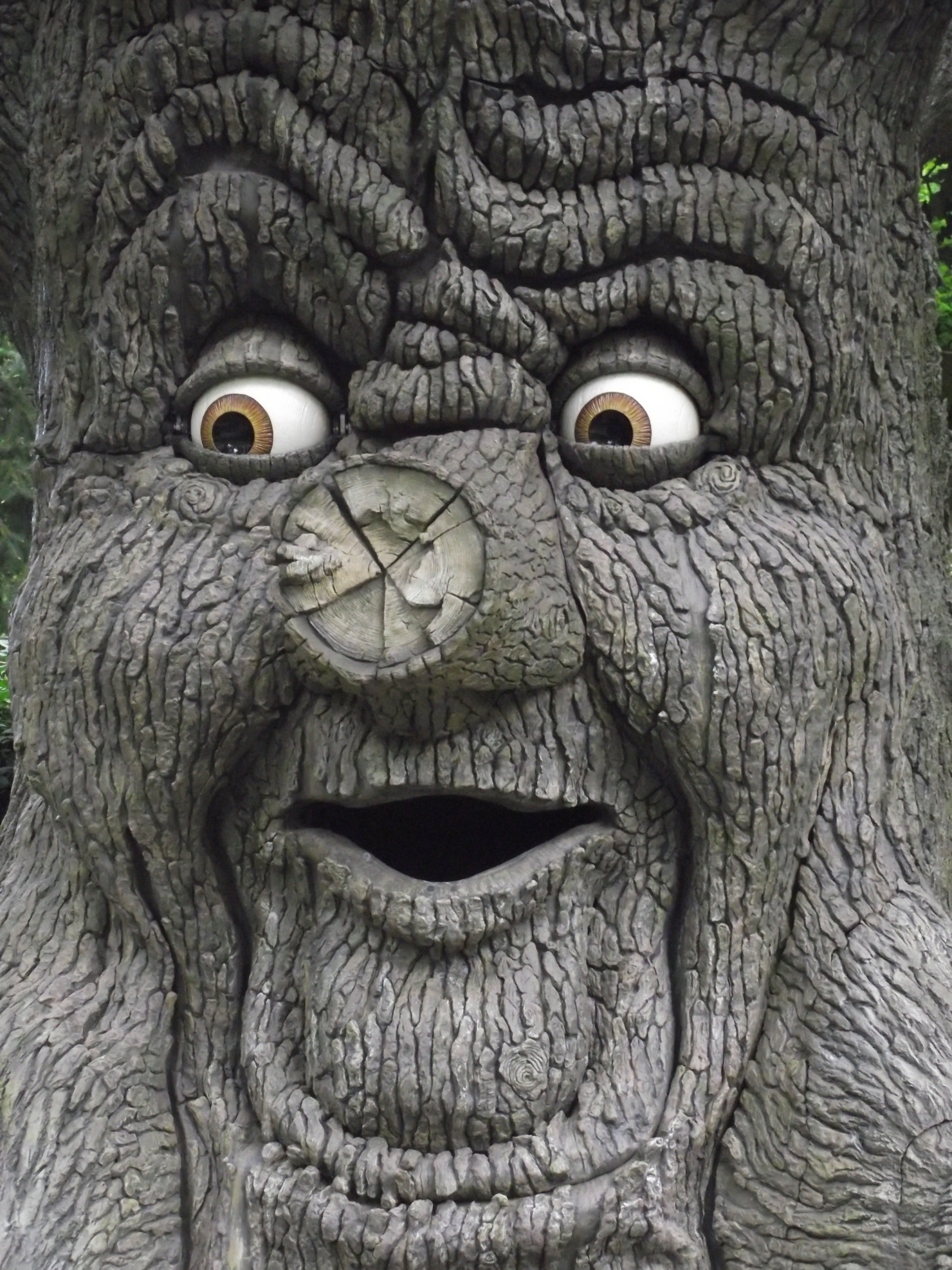
- Created by: Olaf Vugts
- Directed by: Hans Walther
- Theme music composer: Antony Neely
- Country of origin: Netherlands
- No. of seasons: 4
- No. of episodes: 156

Production
- Executive producer: Motek Entertainment
- Running time: 5 minutes / 10 minutes

Original release
- Network: Z@ppelin; Ketnet; NRW
- Release: October 9, 2006 – May 27, 2009

Sprookjesboom, also known as "The Fairy Tale Tree", "Märchenbaum" and "L'Arbre des Contes", is an animated television series for children from the Efteling theme park. The show is produced by the animation studio Motek Entertainment in Amsterdam, based on a concept from Efteling's director, Olaf Vugts. The television program is broadcast daily in several international markets including the Netherlands on TROS and z@ppelin, in Germany on NRW and in Belgium on Ketnet and Club RTL.

Sprookjesboom is similar in theme to DreamWorks' Shrek. It tells the story of the characters that live in the Sprookjesbos, or Fairy Tale Forest, including Cinderella, Little Red Riding Hood, and Tom Thumb. The narration is provided by a talking tree. Behind every 5-minute episode is a subtle moral message. Episodes are in Dutch, with some having been translated to German, French and English. The character animation is based on motion capture performance.

A feature-length film titled Sprookjesboom, de Film was released in 2012 and was awarded the 100th Dutch Gouden Film. The film was based on the characters and stories from the series.

== Sprookjesbos ==
In the Efteling theme park there is a puppet theater in the Sprookjesbos (Fairy Tale Forest) where hand puppets of characters from the series are the heroes. There is also a feature-length live musical show based around the characters which is performed in the park.

In 2008 Efteling began to build an interactive tree in the Sprookjesbos, which was opened in 2010. The old oak sits in the Sprookjesbos, opposite The Little Match Girl. The structure is 9 meters wide and 9 meters high.

== Episodes ==
Season 1 (2006)

- 1. Het geluk
- 2. Hikken en schrikken
- 3. Zeuren om snoep
- 4. Knibbel knabbel huisje
- 5. Koekjes pikken
- 6. Pannenkoeken happen
- 7. Roodkapje is ziek
- 8. Later als ik groot ben
- 9. De treurende muziekboom
- 10. Buiten speln
- 11. Goede raad
- 12. ontdekking van de fakir
- 13. Wonderspiegel
- 14. Klein Duimpjes groter groei actie
- 15. Rijmen vol geheimen
- 16. Wie niet sterk is
- 17. Grootste gemenerik
- 18. Beeldenbos
- 19. Piekerpaddenstoel
- 20. Sprookjesdag
- 21. De schat
- 22. Zeg het niet met bloemen
- 23. Spoorzoeker
- 24. Baardshampoo en reuzenzeep
- 25. Wie past er op mijn huisje
- 26. De rode reuzenschoentjes
- 27. Wie jarig is trakteert
- 28. Midwinterkabouterbal
- 29. Supertoverkracht
- 30. 2 Kleine Duimpjes
- 31. De laars van de Reus
- 32. Lastige vragen
- 33. Benieuwd hoe het afloopt
- 34. Olf de Wolf
- 35. Opgestaan plaats vergaan
- 36. Kies Kie de keu is Keu
- 37. Nooit meer slapen
- 38. Herfst
- 39. Goud maakt niet gelukkig
- 40. In de put
- 41. Drakenvertelsels
- 42. Voor niets gaat de zon op
- 43. Dukaten
- 44. Speurneus Langnek
- 45. Hans en Grietje
- 46. 1 April
- 47. Per ongeluk expres
- 48. Koude winter
- 49. Koning Chocoladebaard
- 50. Gezellig
- 51. Witte Kerst
- 52. De Reuzenkerstboom

Season 2 (2007)

- 53. De heks en de ezel
- 54. De wens
- 55. Eenzame hoogte
- 56. Niet kwaad te krijgen
- 57. Verrassing
- 58. De weddenschap
- 59. Waar twee wolven vechten om een geit
- 60. Ruilen
- 61. Huilebalken
- 62. Ezeltje stampen
- 63. Een klein is fijn club
- 64. Geheime ziekte
- 65. Het heksenhok
- 66. Echte vrienden
- 67. Volle maan
- 68. Spoken in de balzaal
- 69. Op alles rijmt wel iets
- 70. Roodkroontje
- 71. De kabouterquiz
- 72. Omgekeerde dag
- 73. De walsende wolf
- 74. Zoete koekjes
- 75. De raadsheer
- 76. De verdwijning van de fakir
- 77. Hoe hou je heksen uit de buurt
- 78. Hekskapje
- 79. Het hatsjie-bos
- 80. De klok
- 81. Held van het bos
- 82. De zeven geitjes
- 83. De stemvork
- 84. Wie een munt vindt van een ander!
- 85. Een sombere dag
- 86. Kleurrijke dag
- 87. Drakendans
- 88. Het geitenkoor
- 89. Heldendaden
- 90. Klets maar raak ezel
- 91. Ander verhaal
- 92. Waarom is de draak zo boos?
- 93. Samen eten
- 94. Stampen stampen
- 95. Het liefdesparfum
- 96. De nieuwe laarzen van de reus
- 97. De tovervis
- 98. Wie is de baas van het Sprookjesbos?
- 99. Echt niet slecht
- 100. Geitjesstoofpot
- 101. Gezellig samen
- 102. De grens
- 103. De roepende wolf
- 104. Prinsessenlied

Season 3 (2008)

- 105. De waarzegwolf
- 106. Een heks zegt nooit sorry
- 107. Grote opruimdag
- 108. Dat doen de kabouters wel
- 109. De toverstaf
- 110. Het laatste koekje
- 111. Oost west, ezel best
- 112. De verjaardag van de wolf
- 113. Het lolliebos
- 114. Spiegeltje in het bos
- 115. Volg de fluit
- 116. Slaapkapje
- 117. De vliegende ezel
- 118. We zijn weer eens een geitje kwijt
- 119. De bril
- 120. De bal
- 121. Roodkapje waar ga je heen?
- 122. Het portret van de prins
- 123. Het 100ste verhaal
- 124. Zoentjesdag
- 125. Wie niet weg is, is de reus
- 126. Tapijt deugniet
- 127. De fles
- 128. Stappen in de sneeuw
- 129. De geheimzinnige brief
- 130. Ikmaakmenietgraagmoereus
- 131. Een echte vriend

Season 4 (2009)

- 132. De weerhoed
- 133. De pijnappel
- 133. Het kabouterrecordboek
- 135. Goud halen bij de reus
- 136. De saaie wolf
- 137. Supertoverlijm
- 138. Het echte verhaal van de wolf
- 139. Verliefd? Welnee!
- 140. Het liedje
- 141. De lieve wolf
- 142. Voetjes van de vloer
- 143. De jarenverdraaier
- 144. De dief
- 145. Rijmen als de fakir
- 146. Huilen naar de maan
- 147. Wie is er bang in het donkere bos
- 148. De miniwolf
- 149. De spannende dag
- 150. Toverspiegel
- 151. Het spraakwater
- 152. Sterk als een reus
- 153. De muziekpaddestoel
- 154. De onweersbui
- 155. De ring
- 156. Even lekker weg

== Film ==
A 3D feature-length film, titled Sprookjesboom de Film, was released on February 15, 2012 in Belgium, and on February 22 in the Netherlands.
