= Karen Alexander =

Karen Alexander may refer to:

- Karen Alexander (fashion model) (born 1965), American fashion model
- Karen Alexander (singer) (born 1946), American singer-songwriter
- Karen Alexander (environmentalist) (born 1948), Australian environmentalist
