= Vanessa Senior =

Venezuelan comedian and actress

Vanessa Carolina Senior Sánchez (born 22 March 1978) is a Venezuelan comedian and actress.

== Life ==
Daughter of a single mother, she had a brother, Luis Carlos, who died at very young age because of cancer. Later, she would also lose her mother due to a heart attack. Vanessa studied at the Colegio San Agustín del Marqués in Caracas, and studied a higher degree in system analysis.

In 2011, she worked at Warner Channel, but she lost her job after the channel closed in Venezuela and moved to Argentina. She started working with George Harris and her career as a comedian. During that time she also started her blog Vanessadas. She has created a comedy series named Vanessadas, and is also known for the video series El Show de los 20kg and her character of La Vecina in the television program Íntimamente of Canal i.

== Personal life ==
Since mid-2014, Senior had a romantic relationship with Venezuelan DJ Djane Nany. They both have worked in different projects and have openly declared their homosexuality.
