= Karin Petherick =

- Born: Karin Rosamund Burbury; March 14, 1929
- Died: November 2, 2009 (aged 80); London, England
- Occupations: Academic, translator, literary scholar
- Employer: University College London
- Known for: Studies of Swedish and Finland-Swedish literature

Karin Rosamund Petherick (née Burbury; 14 March 1929 – 2 November 2009) was a British literary scholar and translator of Swedish. She taught for many years at the Department of Scandinavian Studies at University College London (UCL), where she specialised in Swedish and Finland-Swedish literature. Her research focused on authors such as Hjalmar Bergman, Selma Lagerlöf, Hjalmar Söderberg, and Edith Södergran.

== Early life and education ==
Petherick was born Karin Rosamund Burbury on 14 March 1929. She grew up and studied in England, Finland, and Sweden. Before her academic career, she attended drama and art school and worked for the British Council in Helsinki and as a librarian at the Institute of International Affairs in Stockholm. She qualified in librarianship in London in 1963.

== Academic career ==
Petherick began her degree in Scandinavian Studies at UCL in 1964 as a mature student and graduated in 1967. She was appointed Lecturer in Swedish in 1968 and completed her doctoral thesis at the University of Uppsala on stylistic imitation in three novels by Hjalmar Bergman, published in 1971. She was promoted to Reader in Swedish in 1980.

Her research and teaching covered a wide range of Swedish and Finland-Swedish authors. She published studies on Hjalmar Bergman, Selma Lagerlöf, Hjalmar Söderberg, Edith Södergran, and Sven Delblanc, and wrote a monograph on Per Gunnar Evander in 1982, later translated into Swedish in 1984. Petherick was a long-time member of the Hjalmar Bergman Society and served on its committee. She also contributed to the journal Swedish Book Review and was a judge for the Bernard Shaw Prize for Translation of Swedish Literature.

Petherick was elected a Foreign Corresponding Member of the Royal Swedish Academy of Letters, History and Antiquities in 1989. After her retirement from UCL, she continued work on an edition of August Strindberg’s Occult Diary for the national series of scholarly editions of Strindberg's works.

== Personal life ==
Petherick was married to Anthony Petherick, who died in 1962. She lived in London and was active in the Swedish Church in Marylebone. She died at her home in London on 2 November 2009, aged 80, and was survived by her son, sisters, and other relatives. A collection of essays titled A Century of Swedish Narrative: Essays in Honour of Karin Petherick, edited by Sarah Death and Helena Forsås-Scott, was published in 1994 to mark her retirement and recognise her contribution to the field.

== Selected works ==
- Study of stylistic imitation in three novels by Hjalmar Bergman (1971)
- Per Gunnar Evander (1982; Swedish edition, 1984)
- Various essays on Swedish and Finland-Swedish authors
