= Karin, Armenia =

Village in Aragatsotn, Armenia

Karin Կարին
- Location within Armenia Location within Aragatsotn
- Coordinates: 40°15′N 44°20′E
- Country: Armenia
- Province: Aragatsotn
- Municipality: Ashtarak

Population (2011)
  - Total: 428
- Time zone: UTC+4
  - Summer (DST): UTC+5

Karin (Armenian: Կարին) is a village in the Ashtarak Municipality of the Aragatsotn Province of Armenia.
