= Abraar Karan =

- Education: Yale University (BA); University of California Los Angeles (MD); Harvard University (MPH); Stanford University (MS); London School of Hygiene and Tropical Medicine (DTM&H)
- Awards: Harvard Public Health Emerging Public Health Professional Award (2026); NMQF 40 Under 40 (2020); STAT Wunderkind (2018); Medtech Boston 40 Under 40 (2018); Harvard Business School New Venture Competition (2018)
- Scientific career
- Fields: Global health
- Workplaces: Brigham and Women's Hospital; Harvard Medical School; Stanford University

Abraar Karan is an American global health physician and researcher at Stanford University. He was active in the COVID-19 epidemic response in Massachusetts and involved nationally through his contributions to lay press media platforms. He is a columnist at the British Medical Journal, a contributor at the National Public Radio, and regularly writes in the lay press.

== Education ==
Karan attended Yale University, where he graduated with distinction in Political Science. During college, Karan worked in the Dominican Republic, Mexico, Honduras, Nicaragua, Uganda, and India on public health research focused on the links between poverty, structural violence, and health. He also studied as a Yale Journalism Scholar under former New York Times Executive Editor, Jill Abramson.

Karan was awarded a Yale Parker Huang Fellowship, which supported a year of research in Hyderabad and New Delhi, India, exploring the Stockholm Syndrome among female sex workers, as well as sex trafficking victims in red light districts. Along with Dr. Nathan Hansen, Karan proposed the term "Sonagachi Syndrome" to describe the psychological dependency that victims of sex trafficking at times display to their captors, named after Sonagachi, India's largest red light district.

=== Medical and public health training ===
Karan earned his doctorate in medicine at the David Geffen School of Medicine at UCLA, where he served as Class President. During medical school, Karan worked at the United States CDC in Mozambique and at the Siriraj Hospital in Bangkok, Thailand. He was selected as a 2016 medical fellow at the Fellowships at Auschwitz for the Study of Medical Ethics.

He went on to earn an MPH in the Department of Health Policy and Management at the Harvard T.H. Chan School of Public Health. During graduate school, with his college roommate Andrew Rothaus, Karan co-founded Hour72 insect repellent, for which the pair won the Harvard Business School's New Venture Competition, and were finalists in the Harvard President's Challenge.

Karan trained in internal medicine at the Brigham and Women's Hospital and Harvard Medical School, in the Hiatt Residency in Global Health Equity established by Dr. Howard Hiatt and Dr. Paul Farmer. Karan earned his Diploma in Tropical Medicine and Hygiene (DTM&H) from the London School of Hygiene and Tropical Medicine in 2019. He completed his infectious diseases fellowship, Masters of Science in epidemiology, and post-doctoral training at Stanford University. He was selected for the Emerging Leaders in Biosecurity Initiative (ELBI) fellowship through Johns Hopkins Center for Health Security in 2024, and is a Term Member in the Council on Foreign Relations.

== Journalism and writing ==
Karan is the co-editor of the book, Protecting the Health of the Poor: Social Movements in the Global South, with ethicist Dr. Thomas Pogge. Karan went on to work as the editor on two global health works with the American Medical Association's Journal of Ethics. In 2016-17, Karan led the theme issue on international healthcare systems, and in 2019-20 on pandemic response.

Karan has written about neocolonialism in global health, and has been critical of the current global health enterprise. Karan has been a columnist at the British Medical Journal since January 2019. He became a contributor to NPR during COVID-19, helping with weekly COVID-19 FAQs, on NPR All Things Considered with Ari Shapiro, and NPR Weekend Edition.

== COVID-19 response ==
Karan was active in the Massachusetts COVID-19 epidemic response as a medical fellow working with Commissioner Monica Bharel in the Massachusetts Department of Public Health. Karan was a member of the Crisis Standard of Care Committee, and also worked on the allocation of scarce resources in the state response, including ventilators and Remdesivir.

Prior to the first COVID-19 surge, Karan wrote about the need for doctors to discuss code status with their high-risk patients in advance to plan for end-of-life care given high rates of ventilator deaths. He was a proponent of the Black Lives Matter protests as being key to bringing attention toward the racial inequities in COVID-19 outcomes in the US. Karan wrote in the Washington Post that central isolation options were a key part of breaking chains of disease transmission after he noted that many of his patients were unable to safely isolate. He opined against the early xenophobia against Asians; in favor of a diverse range of expert voices in pandemic response; and warned that stigma could obstruct the success of contact tracing efforts.

Along with Dr. Ranu Dhillon and Sri Srikrishna, Karan advocated for the need for better masks at a population level early in the epidemic. Karan and Dhillon also penned op-eds warning against the reopening of professional sports given high levels of community transmission of COVID-19 at the time; the need for smarter, targeted lockdowns in high-transmission counties; the use of rapid antigen tests for epidemic control; and the need for stronger public health outbreak investigations and contact tracing to understand why COVID-19 transmission was ongoing despite implemented control measures. Karan warned about the potential for President Trump's COVID-19 case to be used to downplay the virus. He wrote in his column in the British Medical Journal that physicians needed to take a stance in the 2020 United States election because "there is no talking about politics without talking about health." Karan was critical of the Great Barrington Declaration and debated against one of its authors, Dr. Martin Kulldorff, on Democracy Now. He spoke on the Zach Lowe ESPN podcast regarding Covid19 and the risk of spread in the NBA. In late January 2021, he was quoted in a CNN interview with Sanjay Gupta that if all Americans wore N95 equivalent masks for four weeks, "This would stop the epidemic".

== Awards ==
- Harvard Public Health Emerging Public Health Professional Award (2026)
- Term Member, Council on Foreign Relations (2025)
- Top 100 Twitter Influencers in Infectious Diseases (2023)
- 50 Experts to Follow During a Pandemic (2020)
- 40 Under 40 NMQF Leader in Health (2020)
- STAT News Wunderkind (2018)
- Medtech Boston 40 Under 40 Healthcare Innovator (2018)
- Harvard Business School New Venture Competition (2018)
