= Karan Singh (Chhabra) =

Indian politician

Karan Singh is an Indian politician from a town in Baran district in Rajasthan state of Republic of India. He was member of Rajasthan Legislative Assembly during 2008–2013, elected from Chhabra constituency. He is member of Indian National Congress Party.
