= Nany Peña =

Dominican comedian

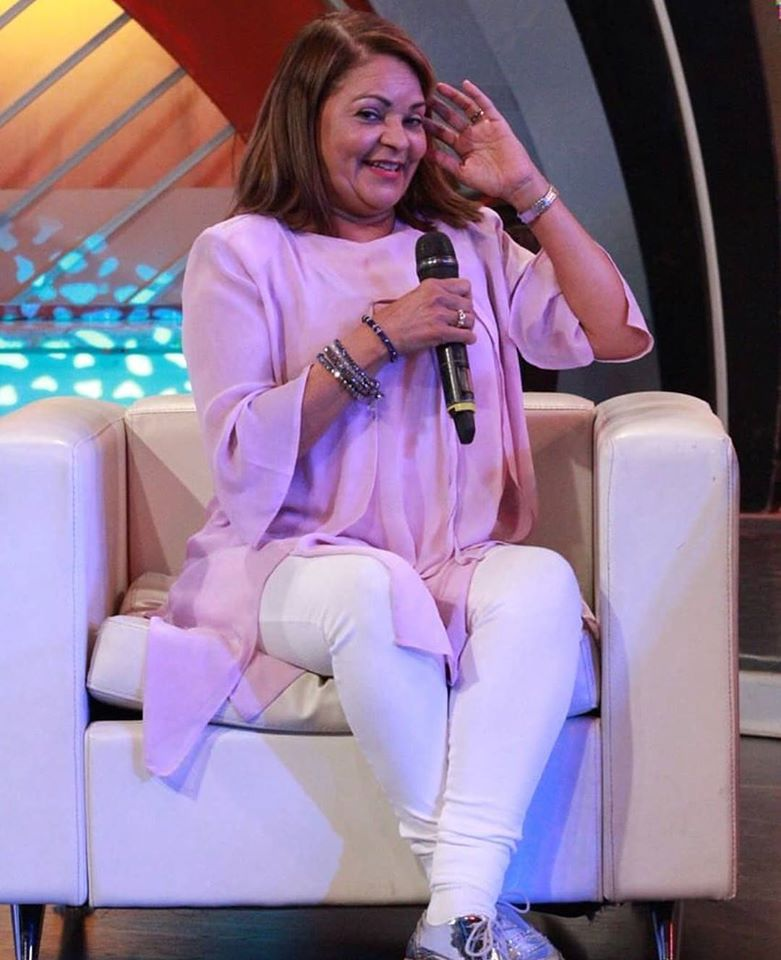
- Born: Ana Amparo de Los Angeles Peña Rodriguez; July 13, 1956 (age 70); Gazcue, Santo Domingo, Dominican Republic
- Occupations: Comedian, actress, TV presenter
- Years active: 1985–Present
- Children: 1 Eliza Pena
- Website: NanyPena.com, YouTube, Instagram

Ana Amparo Peña Rodriguez, popularly known as "Nany Peña" or "Nany", is a comedian, actress, and media personality from the Dominican Republic. She is referred as the Dominican "Queen of Comedy" by fans and media.

== Career ==
Peña began her television career in 1985 with Cecilia Garcia in Cecilia En Facetas when the producer and art director of the show, Guillermo Cordero, hired her as a production assistant. Five years later, she joined the cast of El Gordo de La Semana and Punto Final, hosted by Freddy Beras Goico and televised by Color Vision. The entire cast became known as the best comedy team or Dream Team of Dominican television. The cast including her, consisted of: Felipe Polanco, Cuquin Victoria, Kenny Grullón, Margaro, and Maria Rosa Almanzar. During their comedy sketches, they were often unable to stifle their laughter. Sometimes, Beras-Goico's laughter would become so contagious, that soon the entire cast and crew would start shaking in hysterical attempts to control their own laughter. She featured in both primetime shows until 1999.

Between 1991 and 2002, she was a female actor who starred in numerous TV and radio commercials, becoming a brand ambassador for brands such as Leche Milex, Codetel currently known as Claro, Cafe Santo Domingo, Vimenca & Western Union.

In 1994, she received the Comedian of the Year award from the Soberano Awards, formerly known as Premios Casandra.

In 2001, she created and produced her own TV and radio show named El Show de Nany Peña televised on Antena Latina. In 2004, she and her family emigrated to the United States.

External videos
- Nany Peña being interviewed by journalist Severo Rivera for Diario Libre 2020
- hosted on Diario Libre

Radio

- El Show de Nany Peña (2001-2003)

Television

- Cecilia en Facetas (1985-1990)
- Punto Final (1990-1999)
- El Gordo de La Semana (1990-1999)
- El Patio de Medrano (1998-2000)
- TVHumor.com(1999-2000)
- Con Música Te Lo Cuento (2000-2002)
- El Pasarrato (2001)
- El Show de Nany Peña (2001-2003)
- La Escuelota (2020)

Theatre / Live Shows

- Cosas de Papá y Mamá (1995?)
- La Sirvienta es Peligrosa (1996)
- Papolino (1998)
- Nany P y Kenny G en Gira (1993-1996)
- La Escuelota en Vivo (2018-2019)

Filmography

- Nueba Yol III: Bajo la Nueva Ley (1997)

== Viral on TikTok ==
In 2020, Nany Peña's comedy style spread through TikTok. There are currently more than 12 million users uploading videos with the hashtag #NanyPeña, where they imitate the comedian and share their videos daily on the platform all over the world. Going viral has been a complete surprise, according to Peña.

=== YouTube channel ===
In April 2020, the comedian relaunched her YouTube channel, where she shared memories, original anecdotes from comedy sketches, as well as vlogs and other types of content.
