= AMA Journal of Ethics =

- Discipline: Medical ethics
- Language: English
- Edited by: Audiey C. Kao

Publication details
- Former name: Virtual Mentor
- History: Virtual Mentor (1999–2015), AMA Journal of Ethics (2015–2025)
- Publisher: American Medical Association
- Frequency: Monthly
- Open access: Yes

Standard abbreviations
- ISO 4: AMA J. Ethics

Indexing
- AMA Journal of Ethics
- ISSN: 2376-6980
- LCCN: 2014203677
- OCLC no.: 898302315
- Virtual Mentor
- ISSN: 1937-7010
- LCCN: 2002243263
- OCLC no.: 49893741

Links
- Journal homepage; Online archive at PubMed Journals; AMA Journal Of Ethics Podcast

The AMA Journal of Ethics is a monthly open-access (no subscription or publication fees) publication that includes peer-reviewed content, expert commentary, podcasts, medical education articles, policy discussions, and cases covering areas of medical ethics.

It was established in 1999 as Virtual Mentor, obtaining its current name in 2015. It is published by the American Medical Association and the editor-in-chief is Audiey C. Kao. Themes are student and resident-driven, and issue editors are selected annually to work with editorial staff and expert contributors.

In late 2025, the journal announced that it was ceasing publication after December 2025, with plans to continue hosting previously published content.

== Abstracting and Indexing ==
The journal is indexed in MEDLINE.
