= CAREN =

Virtual reality system used for treatment and rehabilitation of human locomotion

CAREN (Assisted) protocol—is a versatile, multi-sensory virtual reality system used for the treatment and rehabilitation of human locomotion, walking, as well as pain, posture, balancing spinal stability and motor control integration.

== History ==
The company managed project work to ensure growth without the need for venture capital or going public until 1998. In 1997, MOTEK applied for a research grant from the European Commission to develop the system now known as CAREN. This grant was received in 1998 and enabled the development of CAREN's first prototype.

The company also received external funding through MOTEK and NPM capital, both Dutch-based investment companies.

The first production-grade CAREN system was sold to the University of Groningen in 2000. Within the annals of CAREN's beginnings, the technology was being used primarily by scientific and military organizations because of the sheer complexity of its modern intricacies and somewhat complicated testing.
