= John E. Garen =

American economist

John E. Garen is an American economist, currently the BB&T Professor and Director of the John H. Schnatter Institute for the Study of Free Enterprise, and formerly the Carol Martin Gatton Endowed Professor, at Gatton College of Business and Economics, University of Kentucky.

== Education ==
- Ph.D., Economics, 1982, Ohio State University
- M.A., Economics, 1978, Ohio State University
- B.A., Economics, 1976, University of Washington
