= Karen O'Shannacery =

Canadian advocate against homelessness (born 1950)

Karen O’Shannacery OBC
- Born: 1950 (age 75–76); Vancouver, British Columbia, Canada
- Known for: executive director of the Lookout Emergency Aid Society and Society to End Homelessness in Vancouver
- Spouse: Mike Landiek
- Children: 1

Karen O’Shannacery OBC (born 1950) is a Canadian homeless advocate. She is the former executive director of the Lookout Emergency Aid Society in Vancouver and co-founder of the BC Shelter Network.

== Early life ==
O’Shannacery was born in 1950 in Vancouver, British Columbia. At the age of 14, she ran away from her home in Richmond to escape her violent, alcoholic father and general poverty. After staying at various friends' houses in her hometown, she hitchhiked to numerous cities including Toronto and San Francisco. As a youth living on the street, she became involved in drugs and the sex trade industry to find suitable living accommodations.

When O’Shannacery returned to Vancouver, she lived in the Downtown Eastside due to their affordable housing and made money selling copies of The Georgia Straight. As she was a minor, O’Shannacery was determined to avoid detection by law enforcement and picked up tips for survival from other youth on the street. She earned enough money selling drugs and The Georgia Straight to buy her own apartment and have her brother move in with her.

== Career ==
At the age of 18, O’Shannacery was offered a position working at a youth shelter from her friend Mike McKenzie. She accepted the offer under the guise she would be helping troubled youth, but the teenagers using the shelter were often not at-risk and were simply "traveling and having fun before going back to their parents". However, she noticed that older men on the street were not allowed into the shelter or provided with aid, in spite of their lack of options. This lack of access to adequate aid or shelter for homeless individuals promoted her to begin an outreach program. Using a six-month grant from the government, O’Shannacery and a co-worker hired six men and women to work with them and used the remaining money to rent a room every night at the Patricia Hotel. The room contained two beds, one rollaway cot, and various volunteers offering blankets and support. They named their outreach program Lookout Emergency Aid Society because their goal was to “look out” for the people on the street. Once the room was secured, she would then roam the streets looking for homeless individuals and persuade them to come back to the hotel overnight.

In 1973, O’Shannacery became a founding member of the Vancouver Urban Core Community Workers Association while continuing to grow the Lookout Emergency Aid Society. Her advocacy work allowed her to use grant money from the government to grow her outreach program out of the hotel. The society moved into various apartments and hotel rooms before earning a large government grant to build their own shelter on Alexander Street at the end of the era. During the 1980s, the British Columbia Social Credit Party began to cut funding for homeless shelters and outreach programs. This led to a 100-person protest at the Carnegie Centre on the last day of the $50 grant for welfare recipients. During the protest, O’Shannacery stated that the Lookout Emergency Aid Society was sending people via cab to hospitals for first aid as a result of the cut to funding. Human Resources Minister Grace McCarthy claimed this was an "over-reaction" and that the Community Involvement Program made little impact on the lives of disabled individuals.

In 2006, O’Shannacery co-founded the BC Shelter Network. A few years later, O’Shannacery received the Order of British Columbia for her dedication to homeless advocacy. In 2014, O’Shannacery announced her retirement from the Lookout Emergency Aid Society after 43 years. At the time of her retirement, the Lookout Emergency Aid Society was providing homes, transitional housing, and shelters for over 900 people. Two years later, she presided over The Burnaby Task Force on Homelessness, which turned into a non-profit called The Society To End Homelessness In Burnaby. During the same year, O’Shannacery received the British Columbia Civic Merit Award.

As president of The Society To End Homelessness In Burnaby, she oversaw the establishment of the first building for the homeless in Burnaby in 2019. The $10-million project would ensure 52 people had access to adequate shelter and aid inside the three-storey modular building. O’Shannacery was also named to the National Advisory Committee on Homelessness in 2019.

== Personal life ==
O’Shannacery is married to Mike Landiek and they have one child together.
