= Thomas Karren =

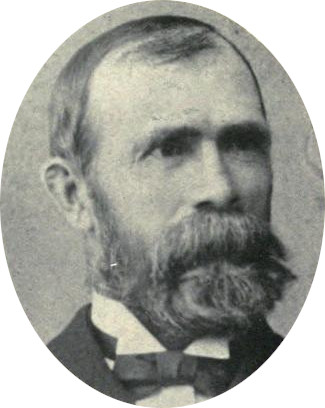
- Born: 1 May 1810; Isle of Man
- Died: 4 April 1876 (aged 65); Lehi, Utah
- Military career
- Allegiance: United States
- Branch: Army
- Service years: 1846-1847
- Unit: Mormon Battalion
- Conflicts: Mexican American War

Thomas Karren (May 1, 1810 – April 4, 1876) was an American soldier and Mormon missionary. He was born on the Isle of Man, 1 May 1810 and died in Lehi, Utah 4 Apr 1876. He joined the Mormon Battalion in 1846 and was honorably discharged in 1847. In 1852 he was among the first LDS missionaries sent to the Sandwich Islands (Hawaii).
