= Djane Nany =

Venezuelan disc jockey, musician, and model

- Born: Daniela Daneska Vásquez Nieves; October 19, 1986 (age 39); Maracay, Venezuela
- Occupations: Disc jockey, music and model

Daniela Daneska Vásquez Nieves (born 19 October 1986), whose stage name is Djane Nany, is a Venezuelan disc jockey, musician, and model.

== Career ==
Djane began her career as an entertainer and singer in 2001, while still a teenager. She also worked as a model, participating in advertising campaigns in Venezuela and modeling for Playboy Venezuela magazine, being one of the playmates chosen to participate in the 2014 calendar.

As a disc jockey, she has produced electro house, progressive house, and tech house mixes. Her mixes include "Replay", "Blindada", "Feel It Close" and "I Love Aruba", and she has opened concerts for artists such as Wisin, Plan B, J Balvin, and Don Miguelo. She has participated in electronic music events such as the 2015 3D Electronic Fest in Panama and I Love Aruba in Aruba, and has performed in countries such as the United States, Spain, Colombia, the Dominican Republic, and Guatemala.

The production company Onzza Producciones marketed joint shows by Vanessa Senior, Tonny Boom, and Djane Nany until 2015, when Boom and Nany announced their separation from the production company. In March 2016, she started a project in Maracaibo for a children's audience, “¿Tu mamá lo sabe?” (Does Your Mom Know?), along with Tonny Boom and Yei Love. Among her shows are "Blindada" and "Orgasmo Electrónico".

== Personal life ==
Djane Nany had a romantic relationship with Vanessa Senior since mid-2014, working with her on various projects. In 2019, she began a relationship with Vanessa Fasolino.
