= Karen Lam (researcher) =

Diabetes and obesity researcher

- Education: University of Hong Kong (MBBS, MD)
- Known for: Diabetes and obesity research
- Scientific career
- Fields: Medicine
- Workplaces: University of Hong Kong

Karen Lam Siu-ling is known for her research on diabetes and obesity. She is the Rosie T.T. Young Professor in Endocrinology and Metabolism at the University of Hong Kong.

== Education and career ==
Lam graduated from the Diocesan Girls' School in Hong Kong in 1969 and graduated from the University of Hong Kong medical school in 1976. She received additional training at Queen Mary Hospital in Hong Kong, St Bartholomew's Hospital in London, and Tufts Medical Center in the United States. Lam was the first president of Diabetes Hong Kong, and has been the honorary president since 2014. She was the first women to lead the department of medicine at Hong Kong University, a position she holds as of 2022. She was named the Rosie T.T. Young Professor in Endocrinology and Metabolism in 2005, and she is director of clinical trials at the University of Hong Kong.

== Research ==
Lam's research centers on diabetes, obesity, and cardiovascular diseases, with a particular focus on hormones in fat cells. A portion of her research examines adipocyte fatty acid binding protein from fat cells, where she has provided details on where it is secreted, and its impacts on diabetes and other diseases. She has examined adiponectin and cancer in diabetes patients, and detailed therapeutic compounds in traditional Chinese medications. Her research has defined connections between obesity and cardiovascular disease and metabolic syndrome. Lam worked to establish diabetes education in Hong Kong through specialized training of nurses and patients, both projects established with private funding. In 1994 she established Hong Kong's first diabetes center at Queen Mary Hospital, an idea that was later spread to other hospitals in Hong Kong.

== Selected publications ==
- Ip, Mary S. M.; Lam, Bing; Ng, Matthew M. T.; Lam, Wah Kit; Tsang, Kenneth W. T.; Lam, Karen S. L. (2002-03-01). "Obstructive Sleep Apnea Is Independently Associated with Insulin Resistance". American Journal of Respiratory and Critical Care Medicine. 165 (5): 670–676. doi:10.1164/ajrccm.165.5.2103001. ISSN 1073-449X. PMID 11874812.
- Xu, Aimin; Lam, Michael C.; Chan, Kok Weng; Wang, Yu; Zhang, Jialiang; Hoo, Ruby L. C.; Xu, Jian Yu; Chen, Baoying; Chow, Wing-Sun; Tso, Annette W. K.; Lam, Karen S. L. (2005-04-26). "Angiopoietin-like protein 4 decreases blood glucose and improves glucose tolerance but induces hyperlipidemia and hepatic steatosis in mice". Proceedings of the National Academy of Sciences. 102 (17): 6086–6091. Bibcode:2005PNAS..102.6086X. doi:10.1073/pnas.0408452102. ISSN 0027-8424. PMC 1087912. PMID 15837923.
- Ong, Kwok Leung; Cheung, Bernard M.Y.; Man, Yu Bun; Lau, Chu Pak; Lam, Karen S.L. (2007-01-01). "Prevalence, Awareness, Treatment, and Control of Hypertension Among United States Adults 1999–2004". Hypertension. 49 (1): 69–75. doi:10.1161/01.HYP.0000252676.46043.18. PMID 17159087. S2CID 29728577.
- Cheung, Bernard M. Y.; Ong, Kwok Leung; Cherny, Stacey S.; Sham, Pak-Chung; Tso, Annette W. K.; Lam, Karen S. L. (2009-05-01). "Diabetes Prevalence and Therapeutic Target Achievement in the United States, 1999 to 2006". The American Journal of Medicine. 122 (5): 443–453. doi:10.1016/j.amjmed.2008.09.047. ISSN 0002-9343. PMID 19375554.

== Awards and honors ==
In 2008, Lam was honored as by the Hong Kong Women Professional and Entrepreneurs' Association for her work on hormones that help fight diabetes.
