= House of Keren =

- Дом Керена (Russian)
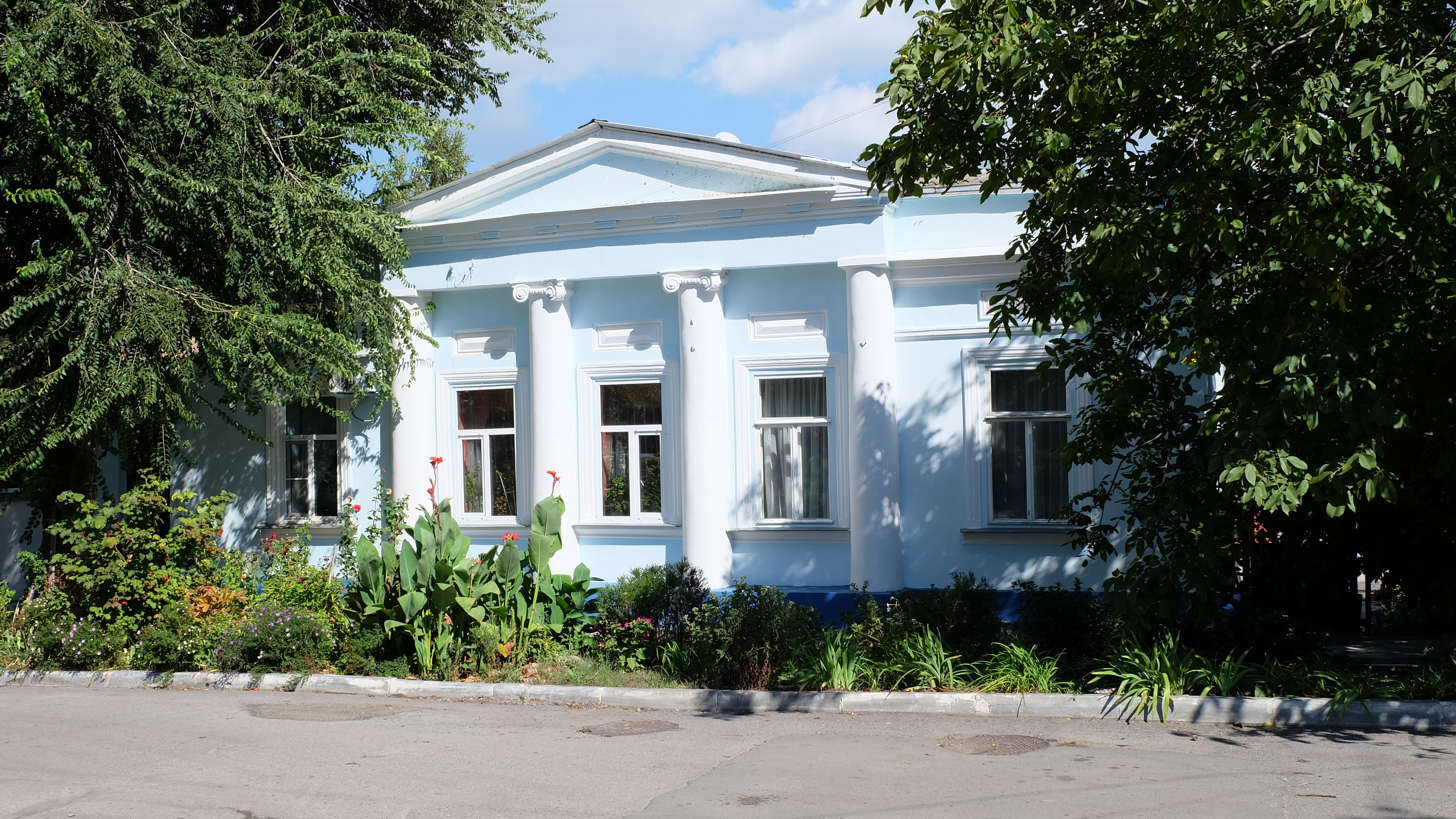
- Interactive map of the House of Keren area

General information
- Architectural style: Classicism
- Location: Taganrog, Schmidt street, 12
- Coordinates: 47°12′36″N 38°56′36″E
- Year built: 19th century

Design and construction
- Architect: Dupont de Laru

The House of Keren (Russian: Дом Керена) is a monument history, cultures and architecture of local value which was constructed in the 19th century down the street of Schmidt, 12 in the city of Taganrog of the Rostov Oblast.

== History and description ==
The house on the project of the architect Dupont de Laru in style of classicism was built at the beginning of the 19th century down the street of Schmidt, 12. For more, than bicentennial history, the mansion many times changed owners and the mission. In 1810 the building became the property of Pavel Daro who on the retained data, on a constant basis lived in another city. From 1890 to 1906 the real estate was the property of the Italian given Ivan Ruffo, and since 1915 belonged to already Belgian Wilhelm Keren given to Victor. Then the Belgian consul lived in this house some time. In 1992 an object was recognized as a monument of architecture, history and the culture of local value.

The house is one-story, it was designed taking into account the cellar for grain storage. The facade of the house is divided into three parts which differ from each other in architectural receptions. Four semi-columns allocate the central part of a facade, they support a pediment with eaves which are decorated by croutons. The general traction eaves settle down over side windows, and windows on the center are decorated with a filyonchaty ornament. The main entrance to the house settled down not on the center, and at the left.
