= Karan Sharma =

Karan Sharma may refer to:

- Karan Sharma (actor), Indian film actor
- Karan Sharma (TV actor), Indian television actor
- Karn Sharma (born 1987), Indian cricketer
- Karan Sharma (cricketer, born 1996), Indian cricketer
- Karan Sharma (cricketer, born 1998), Indian cricketer
- Karan Sharma, director of web series Maharani
