= Estero Carén =

Coordinates: 34°04′S 71°14′W

Location
- Country: Chile

The Estero Carén is a river of Chile.

== See also ==
- List of rivers of Chile
