= Karin Lissel =

Swedish football defender (born 1987)

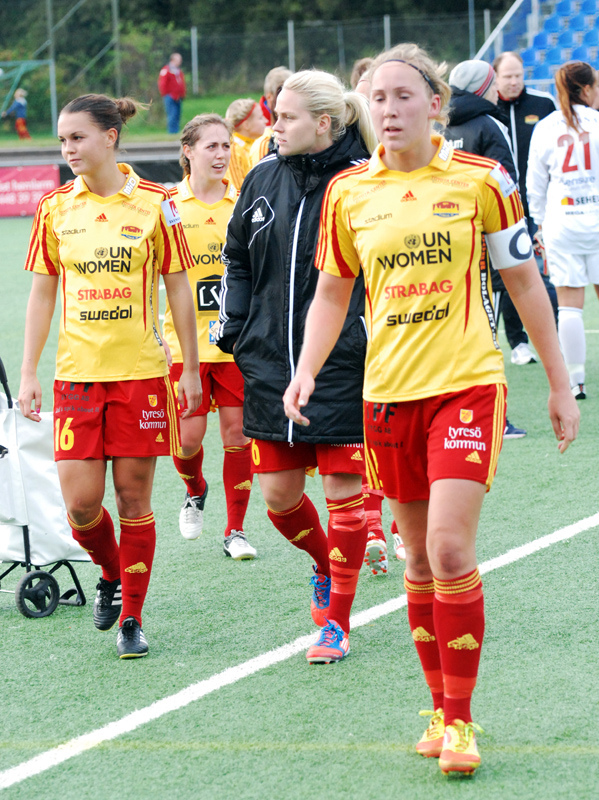
- Lissel (R) wearing the Tyresö captain's armband in September 2012

Personal information
- Full name: Karin Elisabet Lissel
- Date of birth: 25 March 1987 (age 39)
- Place of birth: Borlänge, Sweden
- Height: 1.75 m (5 ft 9 in)
- Position: Defender

Youth career
- Stora Tuna IK

Senior career*
Years	Team	Apps	(Gls)
2004–2007	Ornäs BK		
2008–2009	Hammarby IF	41	(1)
2010–2013	Tyresö FF	55	(3)

International career^{‡}
2009–	Sweden	3	(0)
- * Club domestic league appearances and goals as of 09:05, 18 January 2014 (UTC) ‡ National team caps and goals as of 09:05, 18 January 2014 (UTC)

Karin Elisabet Lissel (born 25 March 1987) is a Swedish football defender who most recently played for Tyresö FF of the Damallsvenskan. She previously represented Hammarby IF.

Tyresö won the Damallsvenskan title for the first time in the 2012 season as Lissel collected her first league winner's medal. She was captain of the team in the absence of the injured Johanna Frisk. With competition for places increasingly fierce, Lissel's playing time reduced during 2013 and she was linked with a mid-season transfer to Kvarnsvedens IK.

Lissel has made three appearances for the senior Sweden women's national football team. After making her debut against China in July 2009, she was drafted into the UEFA Women's Euro 2009 squad as a late replacement for the injured Linda Sembrant.
