= Karen Vega =

Oaxaqueñan Mexican fashion model (born 2001)

- Born: 24 August 2001 (age 24); Oaxaca, Mexico
- Occupation: Model
- Years active: 2020–present

Karen Vega (born 24 August 2001) is an Oaxaqueñan Mexican fashion model. She rose to fame in 2020 by appearing in the July issue of Vogue México y Latinoamérica (Vogue Mexico), becoming the first Indigenous Oaxacan model to be on the cover of the publication.

== Biography ==
Vega is an Indigenous Oaxaqueñan fashion model, signed to Talento Espina Modeling Agency. She was born in a small village in Oaxaca. When she was aged 14, Vega helped her grandfather's wife, a seamstress, measuring for dresses.

Vega began her modelling career when a local fashion designer, Pompi García, asked her to model in his "Magical Realism" shoot.

Vega appeared in the July 2020 issue of Vogue México y Latinoamérica, becoming the first Indigenous Oaxaqueñan model to be on the cover of the publication. She starred in the "Valles Centrales" fashion editorial, styled by Diego Ibáñez and photographed by Enrique Leyva.

After starring in Vogue, Vega has walked in an Autumn-Winter show in Mexico City for the Mexican fashion brand, Barragán. She has also appeared in publications including Elle Mexico, L'Officiel Mexico, and Grazia Mexico.
