= Carin Götblad =

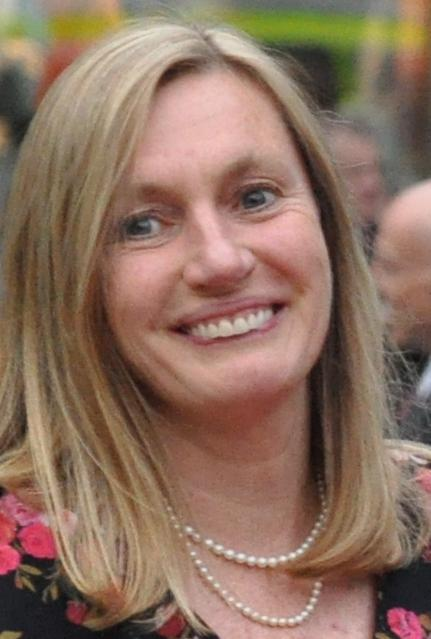
Götblad at the celebrations of the wedding of Crown Princess Victoria of Sweden, 18 June 2010.

Carin Götblad (born January 1, 1956) is a Swedish policewoman who is Police Commissioner (länspolismästare) of Stockholm County since May 5, 2003. She received her law degree (Candidate of Law) in 1987.
