= Caren (name) =

- Pronunciation: [kɒː'ræn], ([kərén])
- Gender: Female
- Language: Welsh

Origin
- Meaning: To love
- Region of origin: Wales

Other names
- Related names: Caron

The name 'Caren' derives from Welsh; Car 'Love' & en 'one', meaning; 'to love' or 'the one who loves'

== Given name ==
- Caren Bohan, American journalist
- Caren Chammas (born 1993), Lebanese judoka
- Caren Gussoff (born 1973), American author
- Caren Jungjohann (born 1970), German field hockey player
- Caren Kaplan, American professor
- Caren Kaye (born 1951), American actress
- Caren Kemner (born 1965), American volleyball player
- Caren Lissner (born 1973), American editor
- Caren Merrick, American entrepreneur
- Caren Metschuck (born 1963), German swimmer
- Caren Marsh Doll (born 1919), American actress
- Caren Miosga (born 1969), German journalist and television presenter
- Caren Pistorius (born 1985), South African-New Zealand actress
- Caren Sonn (born 1968), hurdler
- Caren Lyn Tackett (born 1976), American actress
- Caren Z. Turner, American political consultant

== Surname ==
- Jonathan Caren, British playwright and television writer
- Mike Caren (born 1977), American record producer
- Romana Carén (born 1979), Austrian actress
- Joseph Carens, Canadian professor

== Fictional characters ==
- Caren, a supporting character from Mermaid Melody Pichi Pichi Pitch
- Caren Ortensia, a character from Fate/hollow ataraxia
- Caren Velázquez, a character in Dino Crisis 3

== See also ==
- Karen (name), including a list of people with the name
