= Karin Ageman =

Swedish artist and illustrator

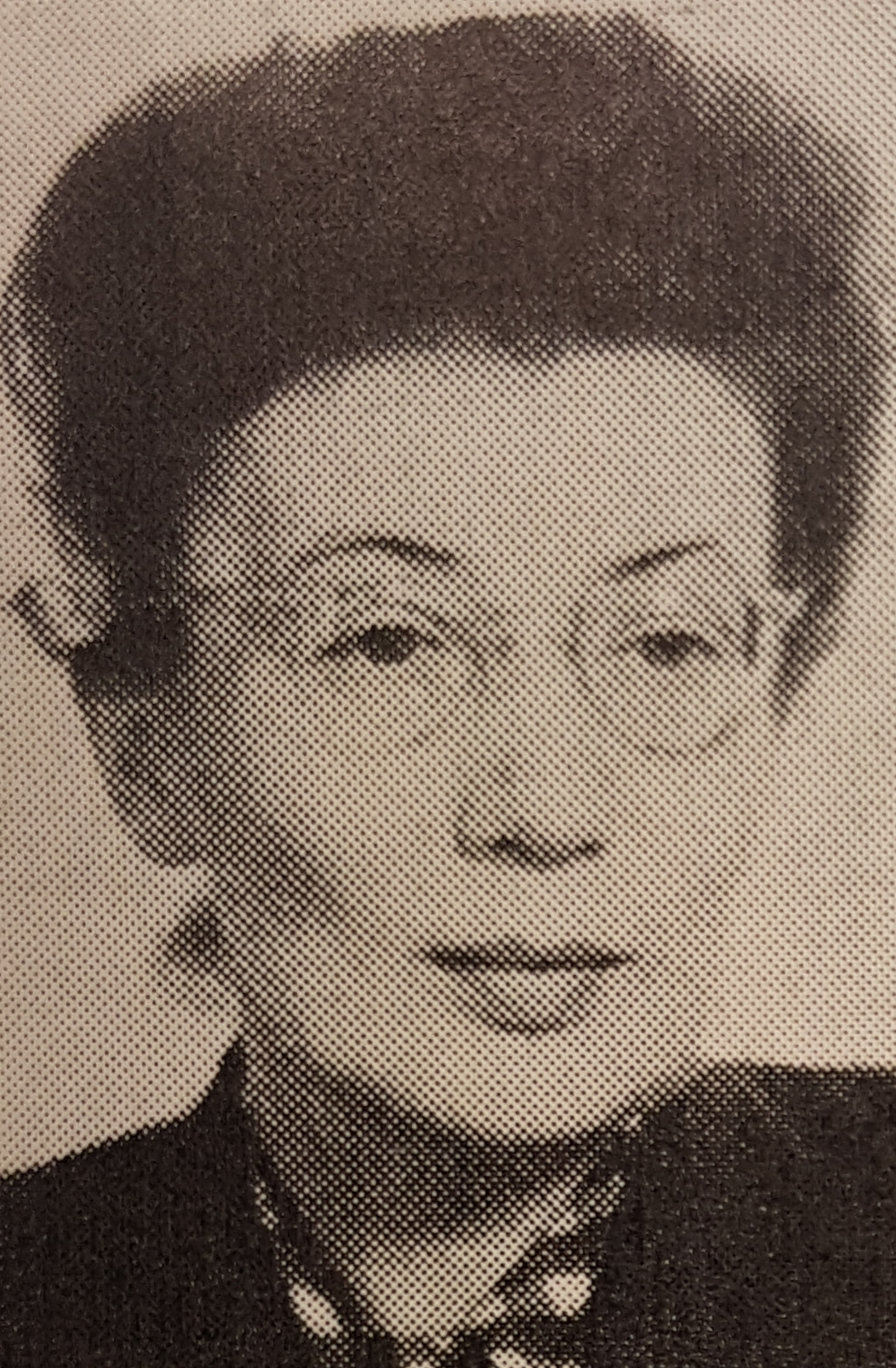
Karin Ageman

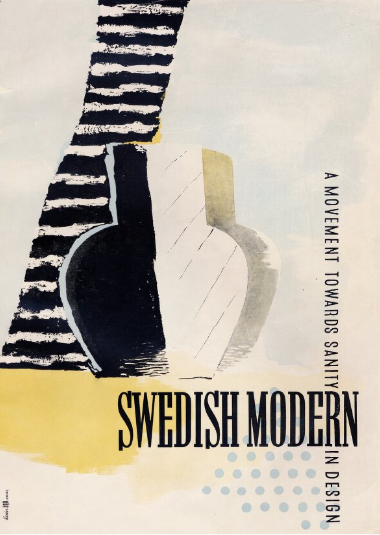
Karin Ageman's cover for August Brunius' Färg och form (1930)

Karin Charlotta Ageman (née Petersson; 1899–1950) was a Swedish artist and illustrator who is remembered for her work as a bookbinder, poster designer and wallpaper pattern creator. In 1939, she was responsible for designing the catalogue for the Swedish exhibits at the 1939 New York World's Fair. From 1945, she taught advertising and book design at Stockholm's Konstfack.

== Biography ==
Born on 2 July 1899 in Stockholm, Karin Charlotta Pettersson was the daughter of the naval captain Anders Gustaf Pettersson and his wife Frida Charlotta née Malmqvist. She was the eldest of four children. Together with her mother and her siblings, she took the surname Ageman. On successfully completing her school education, Ageman studied art at Stockholm's Högre konstindustriella skolan. Thanks to a scholarship from the Svenska Slöjdföreningen, she made study trips to Paris (1926) and Italy (1927) and spent some time studying in Germany.

From 1928 to 1936, she worked at Sveriges Litografiska Tryckerier and Esselte, specializing in advertising. While working for the bookbinder, Frans Beck, in 1928 and 1929, she designed the diplomas for the Nobel Prize in physics and chemistry. Two of her book covers are in the collection of Stockholm's Nationalmuseum, August Brunius' Färg och form and Gustaf Fröding's Stänk och flikar.

In 1936, the posters Ageman had designed attracted attention at an exhibition in the Galerie Modern in Stockholm, especially the one titled Svensk Frukt (Swedish Fruit). That year she opened a studio where she made striking election posters both for the Social Democratic Party and for the Right wing party. After participating in the 1937 Paris Exposition, in 1939 she designed the catalogue for the Swedish exhibits at the New York World's Fair. Together with Carl Axel Virin, in 1940 she published Kurs i modeteckning, textning och layout (Course in Fashion Design, Typography and Layout).

Ageman also designed wallpaper patterns, creating Alger resembling aquatic plants in 1940. In 1944 she submitted a design depicting flowers and fruits titled De blommor och de blader, de göra mig så glader to an exhibition arranged by Levande väggar AB. She earned a strong second place, just behind Arne Jacobsen. In 1945, she began teaching advertising art at Konstfack, continuing for the rest of her life.

Karin Ageman died on 20 March 1950 and is buried in Norra begravningsplatsen.
