= Karan Shaner =

Canadian judge

Karan M. Shaner is a Canadian judge who serves as a justice on the Alberta Court of Appeal. She was appointed in June 2024. Prior to this, she served on the Supreme Court of the Northwest Territories in Yellowknife, Northwest Territories following appointment in October 2011.
