= Carin Du Rietz =

- Born: 1766; Sweden
- Died: 1788 (aged 21–22); Kungsbacka, Sweden
- Other names: Karin Du Rietz, Catharina Du Rietz, Carin Paulin
- Occupation: Soldier in the Royal Guard
- Known for: First female soldier in the Royal Guard in the guise of a man.
- Spouse: Erik Johan Paulin
- Children: An infant, born and died 1788

Carin or Karin (Catharina) Du Rietz (1766–1788) was a Swedish woman who became a soldier at the Royal guard in the guise of a man. She was the first woman in the Swedish royal guard. Her story was a well known and discussed event in her time, and later regarded to exemplify the vivacious Gustavian age.

== Background ==
The daughter of lieutenant Carl Du Rietz and Eva Cronhjelm, she was described as a woman with the stunning intelligence of an Amazon, with power and courage, temperament and beauty, and a "mind of fire". She grew up in a mansion in Småland.

She ran away from home three times; the cause was thought to have been the strictness of her parents combined with the "reading of too many novels". The first time, she reached Stockholm, where she was discovered and captured by her brothers; the second time she escaped to her doting grandparents on Värmdön. The third time, however, she dressed herself like a man and enlisted in the Royal regiment at court in Stockholm, as the first female ever.

== In the Royal Guard ==
During her time as a guard soldier, she preserved her male identity through her "female cunning", but as the story goes, she had so many troubles with sexual advances from both women and men that in the end she could see no other solution but to reveal her identity to the king himself before she was discovered in some other way. According to the legend, she stepped forward and fell down before the king one day when he passed a row of soldiers, of which she was one. She then revealed her identity to him.

When she did so, the king, Gustav III, was highly amused by her story. He allowed her to marry a librarian at the royal court, Erik Johan Paulin. They were both described as very happy about this. Paulin had a priest-education, and the king gave him the post of vicar in Kungsbacka parish. Carin was related to Charlotte Du Rietz, to whom the monarch had a strong attachment.

Du Rietz died in childbirth shortly after the family moved into their new home; her husband and child died soon after.

== Context and other examples ==
Du Rietz was far from the only example of women personating and living as men. The 18 May 1780 an incident was reported in the newspaper as a warning example;

As a great benefit to the maids of the city, death newly discovered a terrible fraud, which, if it becomes an example, would alarm the fair sex, humiliate the clothing of males and make medical examinations necessary for both engagements and weddings.

One of the coachmen of the city of Linköping, Petter Cederlöf, had suddenly taken ill and died within ten hours. The woman taking care of the body then discovered that the man was in fact a woman. It was decided to make it public as a warning. Cederlöf had been hired the spring before after having shown all the necessary papers, amused himself with the maids, and finally proposed and engaged himself with a maid from the city. The fiancée was initially devastated over the death of her dear "Petter", but when she was told, it was reported that: All her tears have suddenly ceased.

Many such stories are told, some of them quite famous; Gustafva Juliana Cederström, (1746–1801) was widely known in the country for having served in several professions as a man, and on the opposite side, there was Lasse-Maja, a man dressing himself as a woman.
