= Karin =

Karin may refer to:

- Karin (given name), a feminine name

== Fiction ==
- Karin (manga) or Chibi Vampire, a Japanese media franchise
- Karin Hanazono, title character of the manga and anime Kamichama Karin
- Karin Kokubu, a main character in Super Boink
- Karin Kurosaki, a character in Bleach media
- Karin (Dragon Ball), a character in Dragon Ball media
- Karin (Naruto), a character in Naruto media
- Karin Kanzuki, a character in Street Fighter media
- Karin Aoi, a character in DNA2 (Squared) media
- Karin Asaka, a character in Love Live! Nijigasaki High School Idol Club
- Karin, a fictional Japanese automobile manufacturer in the Grand Theft Auto series, primarily based on Toyota
- Karin, a character from JRPG style horror, Fear & Hunger

== Places ==
- Karin (Greater Armenia), an ancient Armenian city in Greater Armenia, modern-day Erzurum
- Karin (historic Armenia), a region encompassing parts of the Erzurum and Muş Provinces in present-day Turkey
- Karin, Armenia, a village near Sasunik, Armenia
- Karin, Ardabil, a village in Iran
- Karin, Kerman, a village in Iran
- Karin, Bari Somalia, a small town in Bari region, Somalia
- Karin, Sahil, a historic port town in Sahil region, Somaliland
- Karin, Yemen, a village near San‘a’, Yemen
- Gornji Karin, a village in Croatia near Obrovac
- Donji Karin, a village in Croatia near Benkovac

== Other uses ==
- House of Karin, one of the Seven Parthian clans
- KaRIN, vocalist of Collide
- Karin A or Karine A, a ship impounded by the Israeli Defense Force while carrying 50 tons of weapons
- Citroën Karin, a concept car
- 832 Karin, a minor planet in the asteroid belt and largest member of the Karin family of asteroids
- Karin (花梨; also 榠樝), the Japanese name for the fruit of Pseudocydonia
- KaRIn, the Ka-band Radar Interferometer, onboard the SWOT satellite
- Karin Entertainment, a developers of London Detective Mysteria

== See also ==
- Karen (disambiguation)
- Karie (disambiguation)
