= Karen =

Karen most often refers to:

- Karen (name), a given name and surname
- Karen (slang), a term and meme for a demanding woman displaying certain behaviors

Karen may also refer to:

== People ==
- Karen people, an ethnic group in Myanmar and Thailand
- House of Karen, a historical feudal family of Tabaristan, Iran
- Qaren, a character in the Shahnameh
- Karen (singer), Danish R&B singer

== Languages ==
- Karen languages, or Karenic languages
- S'gaw Karen language

== Places ==
- Karen, Kenya, a suburb of Nairobi
- Karen City or Hualien City, Taiwan
- Karen Hills, Myanmar
- Karen State, a state in Myanmar

== Film and television ==
- Karen (1964 TV series), an American sitcom
- Karen (1975 TV series), an American sitcom
- Karen (film), a 2021 American crime thriller
- "Karen" (Daredevil episode)
- "Karen" (Wentworth)

== Other uses ==
- Karen (orangutan), the first to have open heart surgery
- AS-10 Karen or Kh-25, a Soviet air-to-ground missile
- Kiwi Advanced Research and Education Network
- List of storms named Karen

== See also ==
- Tropical Storm Karen (disambiguation)
- Karren (name)
- Karyn, a given name
- Caren (disambiguation)
- Garen (disambiguation)
- Karan (disambiguation)
- Karin (disambiguation)
- Keren (disambiguation)
- Kayin (disambiguation), another rendering of the name for the ethnic group in Myanmar
