= Karin Lundgren (swimmer) =

Swedish swimmer (1895–1977)

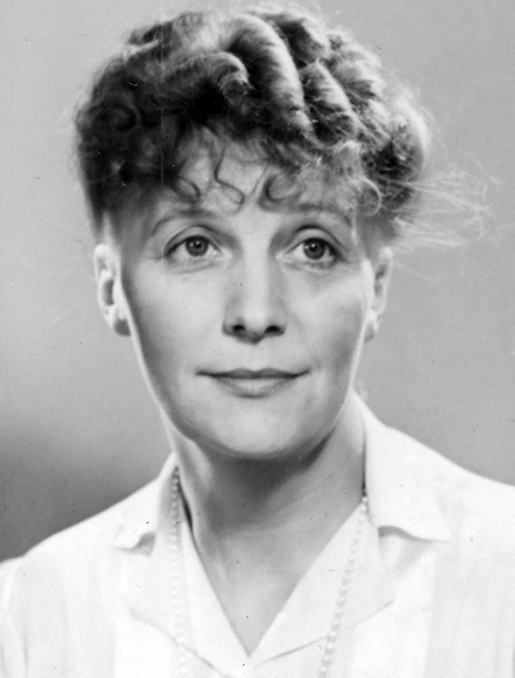
- Karin Lundgren by the 1940's

Personal information
- Born: 4 January 1895 Gothenburg, Sweden
- Died: 16 September 1977 (aged 82) Vallentuna, Stockholm, Sweden

Sport
- Sport: Swimming
- Strokes: Freestyle
- Club: Göteborgs Damers SK

Karin Lundgren (4 January 1895 – 16 September 1977) was a Swedish freestyle swimmer. She competed at the 1912 Summer Olympics in the 100 m event, but was eliminated in the first round.

She changed her last name after marrying Mr. Heijkenskjöld but divorced in 1947.
