= Karina (name) =

- Gender: female

Origin
- Origin: Latin/Japanese
- Meaning: Love or precious/Various(Japanese)

Other names
- Related names: Carina, Katrina, Karine, Karin, Katerina, Katherine, Kabrina, Kariena, Kareena, Karena

Karina (/kəˈriːnə/) is a female given name. In modern times, the country where it is most used (in absolute terms) is Russia, whereas Belarus is where it is the most popular (relating to its population).

It is a short form of Katarina – which in turn shares the same origin as its English form, Katherine. It can also be a variant spelling of Carina, which is the feminine of “loved” or “dear” in Latin while in modern Italian it means pretty, always referred to a feminine subject.

In Japan, Karina is pronounced as 可理奈, 加里菜, etc.

== People with the given name ==
- Anna Karina (1940–2019), Danish-French actress
- Karina, or Elda Neyis Mosquera (born 1963), Colombian guerrilla commander
- Karina (Spanish singer) (born 1946)
- Karina (Venezuelan singer) (born 1968)
- Karina Adsbøl (born 1976), Danish politician
- Karina Alvariza (born 1976), Argentine footballer
- Karina Ambartsumova (born 1989), Russian chess player
- Karina Bachey (born 1974), Argentine politician
- Karina Banfi (born 1972), Argentine politician
- Karina Beteta (born 1975), Peruvian politician
- Karina Bautista (born 2002), Filipino actress
- Karina Bisson (born 1966), Jersey bowler
- Karina Bryant (born 1979), British judoka
- Karina Christensen (born 1973), Danish footballer
- Karina Fissmann-Renner (born 1987), German politician
- Karina Gauvin (born 1966), Canadian soprano
- Karina Yan Glaser (born 1979 or 1980), American author
- Karina González (born 1991), Mexican model and beauty pageant
- Karina Goodridge, Barbadian politician
- Karina Gould (born 1987), Canadian politician
- Karina Grömer (born 1974), Austrian archaeologist
- Karina Habšudová (born 1973), Slovak tennis player
- Karina Jäger-von Stülpnagel, German ballerina
- Karina Jelinek (born 1981), Argentine model
- Karina Jett, American poker player
- Karina Jørgensen (born 1988), Indian-born Danish badminton player
- Karina Krause (born 1989), Thai volleyball player
- Karina Lombard (born 1969), American actress
- Karina Maruyama (born 1983), Japanese football player
- Karina Masotta (born 1971), Argentine retired field hockey player
- Karina Milei (born 1972), Argentine politician
- Karina Moya (born 1973), Argentine hammer thrower
- Karina Nadila (born 1992), Indonesian actress and beauty pageant titleholder
- Karina Nose (born 1984), Japanese model and actress
- Karina Ocasio (born 1985), Puerto Rican volleyball player
- Karina Pasian (born 1991), American singer and pianist
- Karina Penetito (born 1986), New Zealand rugby union player
- Karina Pētersone (born 1954), Latvian politician
- Karina Rabolini (born 1967), Argentine businesswoman and former model
- Karina Ramos (born 1993), Costa Rican television host, model and beauty pageant titleholder
- Karina Sainz Borgo (born 1982), Venezuelan journalist and writer
- Karina Smirnoff (born 1978), Ukrainian dancer
- Karina Sørensen (born 1980), Danish badminton player
- Karina Sumner-Smith, Canadian writer
- Karina Urbina, Argentine transgender rights activist
- Karina Vetrano (1986–2016), American speech-language pathologist and murder victim
- Karina Vismara (1990–2022), Argentine musician
- Karina Vnukova (born 1985), Lithuanian high jumper
- Karina Wilvers (born 1983), Argentine rower
- Karina Winter (born 1986), German athlete
- Karina (South Korean singer) (born 2000), South Korean singer

== See also ==
- Karina (disambiguation)
- Carina (disambiguation), a homonym of Karina
- Kareena, a homophone of Karina
- Karlina
- Karine
