= Karina =

Karina may refer to:

== People ==
- Karina (name), a female given name (including a list of people with the given name)
- Karina (American singer) (born 1991)
- Karina (Spanish singer) (born 1946)
- Karina (Venezuelan singer) (born 1968)
- Karina (South Korean singer) (born 2000)
- Karina Jespersen (born 1975), Danish handball player
- Elda Neyis Mosquera (alias Karina, born 1963), Colombian guerrilla commander
- Karina Nose (known mononymously as Karina, born 1984), Japanese model and actress

== Other uses ==
- Karina (plant), a genus of flowering plants in the family Gentianaceae
- Kärinä, a village in Võru County, Estonia
- Karina, Sierra Leone
- Kalina people, an indigenous people of South America
- Karina station, a light rail station in San Jose, California
- "Karina", a song by Menahan Street Band on the album Make the Road by Walking
- MV Karina, a passenger ship
- Karina, an assassin hero in the game Mobile Legends: Bang Bang
- Karina, a name used locally by the Catholic humanitarian organisation Caritas Indonesia

== See also ==
- Carina (disambiguation)
- Kareena, a given name
