= Karen Chapman =

Karen Chapman may refer to:

- Karen Chapman (badminton) (born 1959), English badminton player
- Karen Chapman (director), Canadian film director

== See also ==
- Karena Chapman, Australian chemist
