= List of fast radio bursts =

This is a list of fast radio bursts. Items are listed here if information about the fast radio burst has been published. Although there could be thousands of detectable events per day, only detected ones are listed.

Name	Date and time (UTC) for 1581.804688 MHz	RA (J2000)	Decl. (J2000)	DM (pc.cm^{−3}) (Note: The dispersion measure (DM) measures how much dust a radio signal had to pass through, as higher frequencies penetrate dust more quickly than lower frequencies, creating a delayed signal across different radio frequencies. If one compares the DM of a radio burst to the amount of known dust in the Milky Way in that direction, as well as the density of dust in intergalactic space, a very rough distance can be inferred. In reality, the actual distance is usually shorter, as fast radio bursts appear to originate inside galaxies with their own concentrated dust clouds, dispersing the signal even more and making it appear much further from the Milky Way than it truly is.)	Width (ms)	Peak flux (Jy)	Maximum estimated comoving distance (Gly)	Observed comoving distance (Gly)	Notes
FRB 010312	2001-03-12 11:06:47.98	05^{h} 27^{m}	−64° 56′	1187±14	24.3±1.3	0.2±0.05	10.14±0.15	—	
FRB 010621	2001-06-21 13:02:11.30	18^{h} 52^{m}	−08° 30′	748±3	8+4 −2.3	0.53+0.26 −0.09	2.41±0.03	—	
FRB 010724	2001-07-24 19:50:01.69	01^{h} 18^{m}	−75° 12′	375±3	13+5 −11	30+10 −10	3.42±0.05	—	"Lorimer Burst"
FRB 011025	2001-01-25 00:29:15.79	19^{h} 07^{m}	−40° 37′	790.3±3	9.4±0.2	0.54+0.11 −0.07	6.62±0.10	—	Announced in 2014 as FRB 011025 (from data archived in 2001).
FRB 090625	2009-06-25 21:53:52.85	03^{h} 07^{m}	−29° 55′	899.55±0.01	1.9+0 −1.9	1.14+0.42 −0.21	8.22±0.12	—	
FRB 110214	2011-02-14 07:14:10.353	01^{h} 21^{m}	−49° 47′	168.9±0.5	1.9±0.9	27+1028 −0	1.79±0.02	—	
FRB 110220	2011-02-20 01:55:48.096	22^{h} 35^{m}	−12° 24′	944.38±0.05	5.6±0.1	1.3	8.48±0.12	—	
FRB 110523	2011-05-23 15:06:19.7	21^{h} 45^{m}	−00° 10′	623.30±0.06	1.73±0.17	0.6	5.77±0.09	—	700–900 MHz at Green Bank radio telescope, detection of both circular and linear polarization.
FRB 110626	2011-06-26 21:33:17.477	21^{h} 04^{m}	−44° 44′	723.0±0.3	1.41+1.22 −0.45	0.63+1.22 −0.12	6.62±0.10	—	
FRB 110703	2011-07-03 18:59:40.607	23^{h} 31^{m}	−02° 52′	1103.6±0.7	3.9+2.24 −1.85	0.48+0.28 −0.10	9.72±0.14	—	
FRB 120127	2012-01-27 08:11:21.725	23^{h} 15^{m}	−18° 26′	553.3±0.3	1.21+0.64 −0.25	0.62+0.35 −0.10	5.25±0.09	—	
FRB 121002.1	2012-10-02 13:09:18.402	18^{h} 15^{m}	−85° 12′	1629.18±0.02	5.44+3.5 −1.2	0.39	12.82±0.17	—	double burst 5.1 ms apart
FRB 121002.2	2012-10-02 13:09:18.46	18^{h} 15^{m}	−85° 12′	1629.18±0.02	5.44+3.5 −1.2	0.43+0.33 −0.06	12.82±0.17	—	double burst 5.1 ms apart
FRB 121029	2012-10-29 16:06:26.0	00^{h} 12^{m}	+42° 04′	732±5	320±40	0.34	6.46±0.10	—	
FRB 121102	2012-11-02 06:35:53.244	05^{h} 31^{m} 58.7^{s}	+33° 08′ 52.6″	557±2	3.0±0.5	0.4+0.4 −0.1	3.85±0.06	—	by Arecibo radio telescope
FRB 130626	2013-06-26 14:55:59.771	16^{h} 27^{m}	−07° 28′	952.4±0.1	1.98+1.2 −0.44	0.74+0.49 −0.11	8.22±0.12	—	
FRB 130628	2013-06-28 03:58:00.178	09^{h} 03^{m}	+03° 26′	469.88±0.01	0.64±0.13	1.91+0.29 −0.23	4.30±0.08	—	
FRB 130729	2013-07-29 09:01:51.19	13^{h} 41^{m}	−06° 00′	861±2	15.61+9.98 −6.27	0.22+0.17 −0.046	7.80±0.11	—	
FRB 131030	2013-10-30 16:13:15.00	00^{h} 25^{m}	+39° 59′	203±4	530±40	0.24	1.50±0.02	—	
FRB 131104	2013-11-04 18:04:01.2	06^{h} 44^{m}	−51° 17′	779±1	2.37+0.89 −0.45	1.16+0.35 −0.126	6.88±0.10	—	'near' Carina Dwarf Spheroidal Galaxy
FRB 140212	2014-02-12 10:31:14.00	01^{h} 31^{m}	+30° 32′	910±4	390±40	0.26	8.15±0.12	—	
FRB 140514	2014-05-14 17:14:11.06	22^{h} 34^{m}	−12° 19′	562.7±0.6	2.8+3.5 −0.7	0.47+0.099 −0.136	5.32±0.08	—	21 ± 7 per cent (3σ) circular polarization
FRB 141113	2014-11-13 07:42:55.22	06^{h} 13^{m}	+18° 47′	400.3	2	0.039	1.96±0.02	—	
FRB 141216	2014-12-16 13:03:24.00	00^{h} 14^{m}	+41° 38′	545±5	870±40	0.23	4.83±0.09	—	
FRB 150215	2015-02-15 20:41:41.714	18^{h} 17^{m}	−04° 54′	1105.6±0.8	2.88+1.2 −0.57	0.7+0.28 −0.095	6.72±0.10	—	43% linear 3% circular polarized
FRB 150418	2015-04-18 04:29:06.657	07^{h} 17^{m}	−19° 01′	776.2±0.5	0.8±0.3	2.2+0.6 −0.3	5.84±0.09	—	Detection of linear polarization. The origin of the burst is disputed.
FRB 150517.1	2015-05-17 17:42:08.712	05^{h} 31^{m} 58.7^{s}	+33° 08′ 52.6″	560±4	3.8±0.4	0.03	3.85±0.06	—	10 repeat bursts at FRB 121102 location: 2 bursts on May 17 and 8 bursts on June 2
FRB 150517.2	2015-05-17 17:51:40.921	05^{h} 31^{m} 58.7^{s}	+33° 08′ 52.6″	566±10	3.3±0.4	0.03	3.85±0.06	—	10 repeat bursts at FRB 121102 location: 2 bursts on May 17 and 8 bursts on June 2
FRB 150602.1	2015-06-02 16:38:07.575	05^{h} 31^{m} 58.7^{s}	+33° 08′ 52.6″	555±3	4.6±0.3	0.04	3.85±0.06	—	10 repeat bursts at FRB 121102 location: 2 bursts on May 17 and 8 bursts on June 2
FRB 150602.2	2015-06-02 16:47:36.484	05^{h} 31^{m} 58.7^{s}	+33° 08′ 52.6″	558±10	8.7±1.5	0.02	3.85±0.06	—	10 repeat bursts at FRB 121102 location: 2 bursts on May 17 and 8 bursts on June 2
FRB 150602.3	2015-06-02 17:49:18.627	05^{h} 31^{m} 58.7^{s}	+33° 08′ 52.6″	559±10	2.8±0.4	0.02	3.85±0.06	—	10 repeat bursts at FRB 121102 location: 2 bursts on May 17 and 8 bursts on June 2
FRB 150602.4	2015-06-02 17:49:41.319	05^{h} 31^{m} 58.7^{s}	+33° 08′ 52.6″	—	6.1±1.4	0.02	3.85±0.06	—	10 repeat bursts at FRB 121102 location: 2 bursts on May 17 and 8 bursts on June 2
FRB 150602.5	2015-06-02 17:50:39.298	05^{h} 31^{m} 58.7^{s}	+33° 08′ 52.6″	556.5±3.7	6.6±0.1	0.14	3.85±0.06	—	10 repeat bursts at FRB 121102 location: 2 bursts on May 17 and 8 bursts on June 2
FRB 150602.6	2015-06-02 17:53:45.528	05^{h} 31^{m} 58.7^{s}	+33° 08′ 52.6″	557.4±3.7	6.0±0.3	0.05	3.85±0.06	—	10 repeat bursts at FRB 121102 location: 2 bursts on May 17 and 8 bursts on June 2
FRB 150602.7	2015-06-02 17:56:34.787	05^{h} 31^{m} 58.7^{s}	+33° 08′ 52.6″	558.7±4.9	8.0±0.5	0.05	3.85±0.06	—	10 repeat bursts at FRB 121102 location: 2 bursts on May 17 and 8 bursts on June 2
FRB 150602.8	2015-06-02 17:57:32.020	05^{h} 31^{m} 58.7^{s}	+33° 08′ 52.6″	556.5±1.1	3.06±0.04	0.31	3.85±0.06	—	10 repeat bursts at FRB 121102 location: 2 bursts on May 17 and 8 bursts on June 2
FRB 150610	2015-06-10 05:26:59.396	10^{h} 44^{m}	−40° 05′	1593.9±0.6	2±1	0.7±0.2	12.17±0.16	—	
FRB 150807	2015-08-07 17:53:55.83	22^{h} 43^{m}	−55° 05′	266.5±0.1	0.35±0.05	128±5	2.45±0.03	—	
FRB 151018.1	2015-10-18 01:05:48.00	05^{h} 31^{m} 58.7^{s}	+33° 08′ 52.6″	570±5	650+0 −650	1.4	3.85±0.06	—	double burst 2.5 seconds apart at FRB121102 location
FRB 151018.2	2015-10-18 01:05:50.50	05^{h} 31^{m} 58.7^{s}	+33° 08′ 52.6″	570±5	400+0 −400	1.4	3.85±0.06	—	double burst 2.5 seconds apart at FRB121102 location
FRB 151113	2015-11-13 08:32:42.375	05^{h} 31^{m} 58.7^{s}	+33° 08′ 52.6″	559.9±7.1	6.73±1.12	0.04	3.85±0.06	—	5 repeat bursts at FRB121102 location: 1 burst on November 13 and 4 bursts on November 19
FRB 151119.1	2015-11-19 10:44:40.524	05^{h} 31^{m} 58.7^{s}	+33° 08′ 52.6″	565.1±5.2	6.1±0.57	0.06	3.85±0.06	—	5 repeat bursts at FRB121102 location: 1 burst on November 13 and 4 bursts on November 19
FRB 151119.2	2015-11-19 10:51:34.957	05^{h} 31^{m} 58.7^{s}	+33° 08′ 52.6″	568.8±6.6	6.14±1	0.04	3.85±0.06	—	5 repeat bursts at FRB121102 location: 1 burst on November 13 and 4 bursts on November 19
FRB 151119.3	2015-11-19 10:58:56.234	05^{h} 31^{m} 58.7^{s}	+33° 08′ 52.6″	—	4.3±1.4	0.02	3.85±0.06	—	5 repeat bursts at FRB121102 location: 1 burst on November 13 and 4 bursts on November 19
FRB 151119.4	2015-11-19 11:05:52.492	05^{h} 31^{m} 58.7^{s}	+33° 08′ 52.6″	560.0±6.4	5.97±0.35	0.09	3.85±0.06	—	5 repeat bursts at FRB121102 location: 1 burst on November 13 and 4 bursts on November 19
FRB 151125	2015-11-25 15:42:36.00	01^{h} 32^{m}	+30° 59′	273±4	1680±40	0.54	2.38±0.03	—	
FRB 151206	2015-12-06 06:17:52.78	19^{h} 21^{m}	−04° 08′	1909.8±0.6	3±0.6	0.3±0.04	14.29±0.20	—	
FRB 151208	2015-12-08 04:54:40.26	05^{h} 31^{m} 58.7^{s}	+33° 08′ 52.6″	558.6±1.7	2.5±0.23	0.03	3.85±0.06	—	at FRB121102 location
FRB 151230	2015-12-30 16:15:46.525	09^{h} 41^{m}	−03° 27′	960.4±0.5	4.4±0.5	0.42±0.03	8.90±0.13	—	
FRB 160102	2016-01-02 08:28:39.374	22^{h} 39^{m}	−30° 11′	2596.1±0.3	3.4±0.8	0.5±0.1	17.81±0.27	—	
FRB 160206	2016-02-06 10:26:50.00	01^{h} 01^{m}	+41° 38′	1262±5	1590±40	0.26	10.67±0.15	—	
FRB 160317	2016-03-17 09:00:36.53	07^{h} 54^{m}	−29° 37′	1165±11	21±7	3	8.09±0.11	—	First FRB observed by the interferometer UTMOST
FRB 160410	2016-04-10 08:33:39.68	08^{h} 41^{m}	+06° 05′	278±3	4±1	7	2.35±0.03	—	
FRB 160608	2016-06-08 03:53:01.088	07^{h} 37^{m}	−40° 48′	682±7	9±6	4.3	4.60±0.09	—	
FRB 160823	2016-08-23 17:51:23.921	05^{h} 31^{m} 58.7^{s}	+33° 08′ 52.6″	567±2	2	—	3.85±0.06	—	at FRB121102 location
FRB 160920	2016-09-20 03:05:43.00	05^{h} 34^{m}	+41° 45′	1767±4	5000	0.22	12.23±0.16	—	
FRB 161202	2016-12-02 13:24:54.00	23^{h} 44^{m}	+40° 48′	291±4	810±40	0.29	2.38±0.03	—	
FRB 170107	2017-01-07 20:05:08.139	11^{h} 23^{m}	−05° 00′	609.5±0.5	2.4±0.2	24.1	5.81±0.09	—	first by ASKAP, high fluence ~58 Jy ms. In Leo. Galactic latitude 51°, Distance 3.1 Gpc, isotropic energy ~3 × 10^{34} J
FRB 170416	2017-04-16 23:11:12.799	22^{h} 13^{m}	−55° 02′	523.2±0.2	5±0.6	19.4	4.92±0.09	—	
FRB 170428	2017-04-28 18:02:34.700	21^{h} 47^{m}	−41° 51′	991.7±0.9	4.4±0.5	7.7	8.84±0.13	—	
FRB 170606	2017-06-06 10:03:27.00	05^{h} 34^{m}	+41° 45′	247±5	3300	0.54	—	—	
FRB 170707	2017-07-07 06:17:34.354	02^{h} 59^{m}	−57° 16′	235.2±0.6	3.5±0.5	14.8	2.15±0.02	—	
FRB 170712	2017-07-12 13:22:17.394	22^{h} 36^{m}	−60° 57′	312.79±0.07	1.4±0.3	37.8	2.94±0.04	—	
FRB 170826.1-15	2017-08-26 13:52:01.252	05^{h} 31^{m} 58.7^{s}	+33° 08′ 52.6″	565±5	1.74	0.38	3.85±0.06	—	15 more bursts at the location of FRB 121102 detected by Green Bank Telescope over a 24-minute interval, bringing the total received bursts from this location to 34.
FRB 170827	2017-08-27 16:20:18	00^{h} 49^{m}	−65° 33′	176.80±0.04	0.40±0.01	60±20	1.57±0.02	—	low DM
FRB 170906	2017-09-06 13:06:56.488	22^{h} 00^{m}	−19° 57′	390.3±0.4	2.5±0.3	29.6	3.69±0.05	—	
FRB 170922	2017-09-22 11:23:33.4	21^{h} 30^{m}	−08° 00′	1111±1	34.1+2.6 −2.8	2.3±0.5	9.03±0.13	—	extreme scattering (long pulse)
FRB 171003	2017-10-03 04:07:23.781	12^{h} 30^{m}	−14° 07′	463.2±1.2	2.0±0.2	40.5	4.37±0.08	—	
FRB 171004	2017-10-04 03:23:39.250	11^{h} 58^{m}	−11° 54′	304.0±0.3	2.0±0.3	22	2.84±0.04	—	
FRB 171019	2017-10-19 13:26:40.097	22^{h} 18^{m}	−08° 35′	460.8±1.1	5.4±0.3	40.5	4.37±0.08	—	repeating FRB
FRB 171020	2017-10-20 10:27:58.598	22^{h} 15^{m}	−19° 40′	114.1±0.2	3.2±0.5	117.6	0.85±0.01	—	
FRB 171116	2017-11-16 14:59:33.305	03^{h} 31^{m}	−17° 14′	618.5±0.5	3.2±0.5	19.6	5.87±0.09	—	
FRB 171209	2017-12-09 20:34:23.5	15^{h} 50^{m}	−46° 10′	1457.4±0.03	2.5	1.48	14.71±0.21	—	
FRB 171213	2017-12-13 14:22:40.467	03^{h} 39^{m}	−10° 56′	158.6±0.2	1.5±0.2	88.6	1.34±0.02	—	
FRB 171216	2017-12-16 17:59:10.822	03^{h} 28^{m}	−57° 04′	203.1±0.5	1.9±0.3	21	1.79±0.02	—	
FRB 180110	2018-01-10 07:34:34.959	21^{h} 53^{m}	−35° 27′	715.7±0.2	3.2±0.2	128.1	6.69±0.10	—	
FRB 180119	2018-01-19 12:24:40.747	03^{h} 29^{m}	−12° 44′	402.7±0.7	2.7±0.5	40.7	3.85±0.06	—	
FRB 180128.1	2018-01-28 00:59:38.617	13^{h} 56^{m}	−06° 43′	441.4±0.2	2.9±0.3	17.5	4.24±0.07	—	
FRB 180128.2	2018-01-28 04:53:26.796	22^{h} 22^{m}	−60° 15′	495.9±0.7	2.3±0.2	28.7	4.73±0.09	—	
FRB 180130	2018-01-30 04:55:29.993	21^{h} 52^{m}	−38° 34′	343.5±0.4	4.1±1	23.1	3.23±0.05	—	
FRB 180131	2018-01-31 05:45:04.320	21^{h} 50^{m}	−40° 41′	657.7±0.5	4.5±0.4	22.2	6.16±0.09	—	
FRB 180212	2018-02-12 23:45:04.399	14^{h} 21^{m}	−03° 35′	167.5±0.5	1.81±0.06	53	1.47±0.02	—	
FRB 180301	2018-03-01 07:34:19.76	06^{h} 13^{m}	+04° 34′	520	3	0.5	—	—	positive spectrum, from Breakthrough Listen
FRB 180309	2018-03-09 02:49:32.99	21^{h} 25^{m}	−33° 59′	263.42±0.01	0.475	27.6	2.41±0.03	—	
FRB 180311	2018-03-11 04:11:54.80	21^{h} 32^{m}	−57° 44′	1570.9±0.5	13.4	0.15	16.86±0.25	—	
FRB 180315	2018-03-15 05:05:30.985	19^{h} 35^{m}	−26° 50′	479±0.4	2.4±0.3	23.3	4.57±0.09	—	
FRB 180321	2018-03-21 07:05:54.00	00^{h} 33^{m}	+42° 02′	594±5	1670±40	0.54	5.35±0.09	—	
FRB 180324	2018-03-24 09:31:46.706	06^{h} 16^{m}	−34° 47′	431±0.4	4.3±0.5	16.5	3.78±0.06	—	
FRB 180417	2018-04-17 13:18:31.00	12^{h} 25^{m}	+14° 13′	474.8	2.52	21.8	4.63±0.09	—	
FRB 180430	2018-04-30 10:00:35.70	06^{h} 51^{m}	−09° 57′	264.1±0.5	1.2	147.5±3.3	1.08±0.01	—	
FRB 180515	2018-05-15 21:57:26.485	23^{h} 13^{m}	−42° 15′	355.2±0.5	1.9±0.4	24.2	2.58±0.04	—	
FRB 180525	2018-05-25 15:19:06.515	14^{h} 40^{m}	−02° 12′	388.1±0.3	3.8±0.1	78.9	3.72±0.05	—	
FRB 180528	2018-05-28 04:24:00.9	06^{h} 39^{m}	−49° 54′	899.3±0.6	2.0±0.2	15.75	9.75±0.14	—	
FRB 180714	2018-07-14 10:00:08.7	17^{h} 46^{m}	−11° 46′	1467.92±0.3	2.9	0.6	14.87±0.21	—	
FRB 180725	2018-07-25 17:59:32.813	06^{h} 13^{m}	+67° 04′	715.98±0.02	0.31+0.08 −0.07	39	6.43±0.10	—	first detection of an FRB at radio frequencies below 700 MHz realtime detection by CHIME
FRB 180727	2018-07-27 00:52:04.474	13^{h} 11^{m}	+26° 26′	642.07±0.03	0.78±0.16	18	6.20±0.10	—	
FRB 180729.1	2018-07-29 00:48:19.238	13^{h} 16^{m}	+55° 32′	109.61±0.002	0.12±0.01	283	0.85±0.01	—	
FRB 180729.2	2018-07-29 17:28:18.258	05^{h} 58^{m}	+56° 30′	317.37±0.01	0.08	113	2.38±0.03	—	
FRB 180730	2018-07-30 03:37:25.937	03^{h} 53^{m}	+87° 12′	849.047±0.002	0.42±0.04	119	7.66±0.11	—	
FRB 180801	2018-08-01 08:47:14.793	21^{h} 30^{m}	+72° 43′	656.2±0.03	0.51±0.09	55	5.71±0.09	—	
FRB 180806	2018-08-06 14:13:03.107	15^{h} 15^{m}	+75° 38′	739.98±0.03	0.69	35	6.91±0.11	—	
FRB 180810.1	2018-08-10 17:28:54.614	06^{h} 46^{m}	+34° 52′	414.95±0.02	0.27	41	3.29±0.05	—	
FRB 180810.2	2018-08-10 22:40:42.493	11^{h} 59^{m}	+83° 07′	169.134±0.002	0.28±0.03	61	1.34±0.02	—	
FRB 180812	2018-08-12 11:45:32.872	01^{h} 12^{m}	+80° 47′	802.57±0.04	1.25+0.49 −0.47	14	7.08±0.11	—	
FRB 180814.1	2018-08-14 14:20:14.440	15^{h} 54^{m}	+74° 01′	238.32±0.01	0.18	139	2.12±0.02	—	
FRB 180814.2	2018-08-14 14:49:48.022	04^{h} 22^{m} 22^{s}	+73° 40′	189.38±0.09	2.6±0.2	8.1	1.11±0.01	—	Detected by CHIME. Second repeating FRB to be discovered and first since 2012.
FRB 180817	2018-08-17 01:49:20.202	15^{h} 33^{m}	+42° 12′	1006.84±0.002	0.37	70	9.20±0.14	—	
FRB 180906	2018-09-06 01:17:47.380	04^{h} 22^{m} 22^{s}	+73° 40′	191±3	3.9	5.4	1.11±0.01	—	at FRB 180814.2 location
FRB 180911	2018-09-11 12:59:13.733	04^{h} 22^{m} 22^{s}	+73° 40′	189.8±0.9	7.9	0.43	1.11±0.01	—	at FRB 180814.2 location
FRB 180916	2018-09-16 10:15:19.803	01^{h} 58^{m} 00.75^{s}	+65° 43′ 00.5″	349.2±0.4	1.4±0.07	1.4±0.6	1.63±0.02	0.45±0.02	repeating FRB localized to a nearby spiral galaxy
FRB 180917	2018-09-17 00:46:35.359	04^{h} 22^{m} 22^{s}	+73° 40′	189.5±0.1	63	1.0	1.11±0.01	—	at FRB 180814.2 location
FRB 180919	2018-09-19 12:36:09.141	04^{h} 22^{m} 22^{s}	+73° 40′	190±0.1	16	0.75	1.11±0.01	—	at FRB 180814.2 location
FRB 180924	2018-09-24 16:23:12.6265	21^{h} 44^{m} 25.26^{s}	−40° 54′ 00.1″	361.42±0.06	1.3±0.09	16	4.26±0.07	3.99±0.06	first non-repeating FRB whose source has been localized
FRB 181016	2018-10-16 04:16:56.30	15^{h} 46^{m}	−25° 25′	1982.8±2.8	8.6+0.7 −0.8	10.19	17.78±0.27	—	
FRB 181017.1	2018-10-17 10:24:37.40	22^{h} 06^{m}	−08° 51′	239.97±0.03	0.33	90	2.54±0.04	—	
FRB 181017.2	2018-10-17 23:26:11.86	17^{h} 05^{m}	+68° 17′	1281.9±0.4	13.4±0.1	0.4±0.3	10.89±0.15	—	repeating FRB
FRB 181019	2018-10-19 08:13:22.75	01^{h} 58^{m} 00.75^{s}	+65° 43′ 00.5″	349.0±0.6	4.1±0.3	0.6±0.3	1.63±0.02	0.45±0.02	burst at FRB 180916 location
FRB 181028	2018-10-28 10:12:31.477	04^{h} 22^{m} 22^{s}	+73° 40′	188.9±0.5	42	0.29	1.11±0.01	—	at FRB 180814.2 location
FRB 181030.1	2018-10-30 04:13:13.025	10^{h} 54^{m}	+73° 44′	103.5±0.7	0.59±0.08	3.2±1.7	0.68±0.01	0.088±0.003	repeating FRB, most likely originating from NGC 3403.
FRB 181030.2	2018-10-30 04:16:21.654	10^{h} 54^{m}	+73° 44′	103.5±0.3	1.43±0.08	3.1±1.4	0.68±0.01	0.088±0.003	repeating FRB, most likely originating from NGC 3403.
FRB 181104.1	2018-11-04 06:57:18.585	01^{h} 58^{m} 00.75^{s}	+65° 43′ 00.5″	349.5±0.3	1.37±0.07	1.4±0.5	1.63±0.02	0.45±0.02	burst at FRB 180916 location
FRB 181104.2	2018-11-04 07:07:01.591	01^{h} 58^{m} 00.75^{s}	+65° 43′ 00.5″	349.6±0.2	6.3±1.1	0.4±0.2	1.63±0.02	0.45±0.02	burst at FRB 180916 location
FRB 181112	2018-11-12 17:31:15.483	21^{h} 49^{m}	−52° 58′	589.27±0.03	2.1±0.2	12	4.96±0.09	5.81±0.10	localized to a small galaxy
FRB 181119	2018-11-19 16:49:03.191	12^{h} 42^{m}	+65° 08′	364.2±1	6.3±0.6	0.3±0.2	3.49±0.05	—	repeating FRB
FRB 181120	2018-11-20 05:56:06.232	01^{h} 58^{m} 00.75^{s}	+65° 43′ 00.5″	349.9±0.6	1.1±0.09	1.1±0.5	1.63±0.02	0.45±0.02	burst at FRB 180916 location
FRB 181128	2018-11-28 08:27:41.740	04^{h} 56^{m}	+63° 23′	450.2±0.3	2.43±0.16	0.5±0.3	3.56±0.05	—	repeating FRB
FRB 181219	2018-12-19 07:04:41.678	04^{h} 56^{m}	+63° 23′	450.8±0.3	5.5±0.7	0.3±0.2	3.56±0.05	—	repeating FRB
FRB 181222	2018-12-22 03:59:23.208	01^{h} 58^{m} 00.75^{s}	+65° 43′ 00.5″	349.1±0.1	4.95±0.01	4.9±1.8	1.63±0.02	0.45±0.02	burst at FRB 180916 location
FRB 181223	2018-12-23 03:51:28.960	01^{h} 58^{m} 00.75^{s}	+65° 43′ 00.5″	349.7±0.7	1.06±0.05	1.7±0.6	1.63±0.02	0.45±0.02	burst at FRB 180916 location
FRB 181225	2018-12-25 03:53:03.926	01^{h} 58^{m} 00.75^{s}	+65° 43′ 00.5″	348.9±0.7	1.3±0.3	0.4±0.2	1.63±0.02	0.45±0.02	burst at FRB 180916 location
FRB 181226	2018-12-26 03:43:30.107	01^{h} 58^{m} 00.75^{s}	+65° 43′ 00.5″	348.8±0.2	0.87±0.03	1.6±0.6	1.63±0.02	0.45±0.02	burst at FRB 180916 location
FRB 181228	2018-12-28 13:48:50.10	06^{h} 09^{m}	−45° 58′	354.2±0.9	1.24+0.13 −0.15	19.23	3.78±0.06	—	
FRB 190103	2019-01-03 13:47:23.322	12^{h} 42^{m}	+65° 08′	364.0±0.3	2.66±0.1	0.6±0.3	3.49±0.05	—	burst at FRB 181119 location
FRB 190116.1	2019-01-16 13:07:33.833	12^{h} 49^{m}	+27° 09′	444.0±0.6	4.0±0.5	0.3±0.2	4.37±0.08	—	repeating FRB
FRB 190116.2	2019-01-16 13:08:20.412	12^{h} 49^{m}	+27° 09′	443.6±0.8	1.5±0.3	0.4±0.2	4.37±0.08	—	repeating FRB
FRB 190126	2019-01-26 01:32:45.328	01^{h} 58^{m} 00.75^{s}	+65° 43′ 00.5″	349.8±0.5	2.53±0.13	0.7±0.3	1.63±0.02	—	
FRB 190209	2019-02-09 08:20:20.977	09^{h} 37^{m}	+77° 40′	424.6±0.6	3.7±0.5	0.4±0.2	3.95±0.07	—	repeating FRB
FRB 190210	2019-02-10 08:17:13.907	09^{h} 37^{m}	+77° 40′	425.2±0.5	9.4±1.4	0.6±0.4	3.95±0.07	—	repeating FRB
FRB 190216	2019-02-16 15:26:58.029	17^{h} 05^{m}	+68° 17′	1281.0±0.6	20.2±1.7	0.4±0.2	10.89±0.15	—	burst at FRB 181017.2 location
FRB 190222	2019-02-22 18:46:01.367	20^{h} 52^{m}	+69° 50′	460.6±0.1	2.97±0.90	1.9±0.6	3.91±0.07	—	repeating FRB
FRB 190301	2019-03-01 18:03:02.479	20^{h} 52^{m}	+69° 50′	459.8±0.4	2.44±0.8	1.4±0.5	3.91±0.07	—	repeating FRB
FRB 190313	2019-03-13 09:21:46.725	12^{h} 42^{m}	+65° 08′	364.2±0.6	1.5±0.2	0.4±0.2	3.49±0.05	—	burst at FRB 181119 location
FRB 190523	2019-05-23 06:05:55.815	13^{h} 48^{m} 15.6^{s}	+72° 28′ 11″	760.8±0.6	0.42±0.05	670	7.08±0.11	7.51±0.06	localized to only 5 arcseconds
FRB 190711	2019-07-11 01:53:41.093	21^{h} 56^{m}	−80° 23′	593±2	—	—	—	—	
FRB 190714	2019-07-14 05:17:12.901	12^{h} 16^{m}	−13° 00′	504±2	—	—	—	—	
FRB 190805	2019-08-05 09:21:08	22^{h} 18^{m}	−08° 35′	460.4±0.2	6±2	—	—	—	burst at FRB 171019 location
FRB 190806	2019-08-06 17:07:58.0	00^{h} 02^{m}	−07° 35′	388.5	—	—	—	—	
FRB 190906	2019-09-06 00:08:46	05^{h} 31^{m} 58.7^{s}	33° 08′ 52.6″	—	—	—	—	—	burst at FRB 121102 location
FRB 190910.1-12	2019-09-12	05^{h} 31^{m} 58.7^{s}	33° 08′ 52.6″	—	—	—	—	—	12 bursts detected at FRB 121102 location in a 3-hour timespan
FRB 191001	2019-10-01 16:55:35.971	21^{h} 32^{m}	−54° 40′	506.92±0.04	—	—	4.37±0.08	—	
FRB 191107	2019-11-07 18:55:36.7	08^{h} 02^{m}	−13° 44′	714.25	—	—	—	—	
FRB 191223	2019-12-23 04:55:31.2	20^{h} 34^{m}	−75° 09′	665	—	—	—	—	
FRB 191228	2019-12-28 09:16:16.444	22^{h} 57^{m}	−29° 46′	297.9±0.5	—	—	—	—	
FRB 200120	2020-01-20	—	—	—	—	—	—	—	
FRB 200428	2020-04-28	19^{h} 35^{m}	+21° 54′	332.8	—	—	—	—	
FRB 201124	2020-11-24; 08:50:41	05^{h} 08^{m}	+26° 11′	413.52±0.05	—	—	—	—	very high repeating burst activity reported to have begun 23 March 2021; includes "extremely bright" 15 April 2021
FRB 210401	2021-04-01 11:33:01.66(1)	05^{h} 07^{m}	+25° 53′	412±3	—	—	—	—	
FRB 210402	2021-04-02 05:48:59.114(1)	05^{h} 08^{m}	+26° 02′	414±3	—	—	—	—	
FRB 20240304B									The farthest FRB detected as of August 2025
