= Carine =

Carine may refer to:

== Places ==
- Carine, Western Australia, a suburb of Perth
  - Electoral district of Carine, in the Western Australian parliament
- Carine, Nikšić, Montenegro
- Carine (Mysia), a town of ancient Mysia, now in Turkey

== Owl species ==
- Little owl (Carine noctua or Athene noctua)
- Rodrigues scops owl (Carine murivora or Mascarenotus murivorus)

== Other uses ==
- CARINE, a theorem prover
- Carine (given name)

== See also ==
- Carina (disambiguation)
