= C. Renée James =

American astronomer

Carol Renée James (also published as C. Renée James and C. Renée Beveridge) is an Australian astronomer. She was a professor of physics at Sam Houston State University for 27 years, from 1991-2026. Her research publications include spectroscopy of stars in the galactic halo of the Milky Way and in the Carina Dwarf Spheroidal Galaxy, and work on astronomy education. She is also the author of several books popularizing astronomy.

== Life ==
James was born in Houston, Texas, on 1 October 1969, the daughter of Don R. James, Sr. and Carol Edwards James. She graduated with a BA in Physics from Rice University, and has a doctorate from the University of Texas at Austin. Her 2000 doctoral dissertation, Chemical and kinematic correlations in the galactic halo, was supervised by Christopher Sneden.

In 2021, James was recognized by the Texas State University System Board of Regents as a Regents' Teacher.

== Books ==
- James, C. Renée (2010). Seven Wonders of the Universe That You Probably Took for Granted. Baltimore: Johns Hopkins University Press. ISBN 978-0-8018-9797-9.
- James, C. Renée (2014). Science Unshackled: How obscure, abstract, seemingly useless scientific research turned out to be the basis for modern life. Baltimore: Johns Hopkins University Press. ISBN 978-1-4214-1500-0.
- James, C. Renée (2023). Things That Go Bump in the Universe: How Astronomers Decode Cosmic Chaos. Baltimore: Johns Hopkins University Press. ISBN 978-1-4214-4693-6.
