= Carina =

Carina may refer to:

== Places ==
=== Australia ===
- Carina, Queensland, a suburb in Brisbane
- Carina Heights, Queensland, a suburb in Brisbane
- Carina, Victoria, a locality in Mildura

=== Serbia ===
- Carina, Osečina, a village in the Kolubara District

== People ==
- Carina (name), a given name (including a list of people with the name)
- Carina, a pet form of the given name Cara
- Carina, a Latinization of Cairenn, said to be the mother of Niall of the Nine Hostages

== Anatomy ==
- Keel (bird anatomy), or carina, an extension of the sternum in some birds
- Carina of trachea, the point at which the trachea branches to form the two mainstem bronchi
- Carinae, in dinosaur anatomy, enameled ridges on the cutting edges of the teeth

== Astronomy ==
- Carina (Chinese astronomy)
- Carina (constellation), a constellation
- Carina Dwarf, a dwarf galaxy orbiting the Milky Way
- Carina Nebula (NGC 3372)

== Arts, entertainment, and media ==
- "Carina" (Corrado Lojacono song), a 1958 song covered by Sophia Loren, Dean Martin and Cliff Richard
- "Carina" (Larz-Kristerz song), a 2008 song by Swedish band Larz-Kristerz
- Carina Press, the digital-only publishing house from Harlequin Enterprises
- Carina (Marvel Cinematic Universe), a character in the Marvel Cinematic Universe

== Other uses ==
- Carina, a Latin word for the keel of a ship or for its entire hull
- Cariña, a variant of Carib language
- Carina Rugby League Football Club
- List of storms named Carina, various tropical cyclones
- Toyota Carina, an automobile
- USS Carina (AK-74), a 1942 United States Navy cargo ship used in World War II
- Sailing yacht Carina, which disappeared off the Dublin coast in 1944
- Sailing yacht Carina II, which won the 1955 and 1957 Fastnet Races skippered by USA sailor Richard Nye
- Alternative spelling of the title of nobility, Tsarina

== See also ==
- Cairina, a genus of duck
- Carinae, an area of ancient Rome
- Carine (disambiguation)
- Karina (disambiguation)
