= Carina (name) =

Carina is a female given name. Notable persons with that name include:

- Carina Adolfsson Elgestam (born 1959), Swedish politician
- Carina Afable (born 1944), Filipino actress and singer
- Carina Aulenbrock (born 1994), German volleyball player
- Carina Axelsson (born 1968), American author
- Carina Bär (born 1990), German rower
- Carina Beduschi (born 1984), Brazilian actress, television host, architect, and model
- Carina Benninga (born 1962), Dutch field hockey player
- Carina Berg (born 1977), Swedish comedian and television presenter
- Carina Burman (born 1960) is a Swedish novelist and literature scholar
- Carina Caicedo (born 1987), Ecuadorian footballer
- Carina Christensen (born 1972), Danish politician
- Carina Cruz (born 1983), Colombian actress, model and designer
- Carina Rosenvinge Christiansen (born 1991), Danish archer
- Carina Dahl (born 1985), Norwegian singer and songwriter
- Carina DiAntonio (born 2004), Canadian ice hockey player
- Carina Herrstedt (born 1971), Swedish politician
- Carina Holmberg (born 1983), Swedish football player
- Carina Horn (born 1989), South African sprinter
- Carina Hägg (born 1957), Swedish politician
- Carina Görlin (born 1963), Swedish cross country skier
- Carina Jaarnek (1962–2016), Swedish singer
- Carina Johansson, Swedish musician
- Carina Kirssi Ketonen (born 1976), Finnish racing cyclist
- Carina Lau (born 1965), Chinese actress
- Carina Lemoine (born 1969), Dutch singer
- Carina Lidbom (born 1957), Swedish actress and comedian
- Carina Ljungdahl (born 1960), Swedish freestyle swimmer
- Carina Lorenzo (born 1994), Dominican handball player
- Carina Moberg (1966–2012), Swedish politician
- Carina E. Nilsson, Swedish pianist
- Carina Ohlsson (born 1957), Swedish politician
- Carina Örgård (born 1970), Swedish politician
- Carina Persson (born 1958), Swedish model
- Carina Raich (born 1979), Austrian alpine skier
- Carina Ricco (born 1969), Mexican actress, singer, musician, producer and composer
- Carina Round (born 1979), British singer-songwriter
- Carina Rozenfeld (born 1972), French author
- Carina Rydberg (born 1962), Swedish writer
- Carina Strobel (born 1997), German ice hockey player
- Carina Wenninger (born 1991), Austrian football player
- Carina Wiese (born 1970), German actress
- Carina Witthöft (born 1995), German tennis player
- Carina Vance Mafla (born 1977), American politician
- Carina Vitulano (born 1975), Italian football referee
- Carina Vogt (born 1992), German ski jumper
- Carina Van Cauter (born 1962), Belgian politician
- Carina van Zyl (born 1975), South African field hockey player
- Carina Zampini (born 1975), Argentine actress

== See also ==
- Carina (disambiguation)
- Carlina (name)
- Karina (name)
- Cara (given name)
- Carine (given name)
