= Kareena =

- Gender: Female

Origin
- Origin: Indian, Latin, Greek, Scandinavian, Nordic, Arabic
- Meaning: Pure; Compassion; Empathy; Kindness; Loved; Beloved; Dear; Innocent; Clean; Clear; Beautiful; Flower

Other names
- Related names: Karenina, Karina, Karena, Karen, Katherine, Katrina, Karuna, Kuruna, Kreena, Krishna, Krisha, Kriya, Karun, Karan

Kareena is a female given name common across various cultures.

Kareena is derived from and used as a variation of the name Katherine, or, alternatively, from the Sanskrit word and name Karuna, which means "compassion" , “empathy" and “kindness” .

The name Kareena is a beautiful and globally diverse feminine name with multiple linguistic origins.

== Notable people ==
- Kareena Kapoor (born 1980), Indian film actress
- Kareena Cuthbert (born 1987), Scottish field hockey player
- Kareena Lee (born 1993), Australian swimmer

== Fictional characters ==
- Kareena Ferreira, character from soap opera EastEnders
- Kareena Jones, character from sketch comedy television series All That
- Kareena Singh, character from television series Madam Sir. Twin sister of Karishma Singh.
- Kareena Sood, Main character from comedy television series Kareena Kareena.

== See also ==
- Kareena Kareena, Zee TV comedy serial
- Karina (disambiguation)
- karina - homophone of Kareena
