= Karine =

- Gender: Female
- Language: French

Origin
- Meaning: great

Other names
- Related names: Karin, Carine, Karina

Karine is a feminine French given name. Notable people with the name include:

- Karine Bakhoum, Egyptian American chef
- Karine Baste (born 1982), French journalist and news presenter
- Karine Beauchard (born 1978), French mathematician
- Karine Berger (born 1973), French politician
- Karine Ferri (born 1982), French television presenter and model
- Karine Giboulo (born 1980), Canadian artist
- Karine Costa (born 1977), French singer
- Karine Haaland (born 1966), Norwegian comic strip creator
- Karine Icher (born 1979), French professional golfer
- Karine Laurent Philippot (born 1974), French cross country skier
- Karine Lebon (born 1985), French politician
- Karine Legault (born 1978), retired Canadian female freestyle swimmer
- Karine Polwart (born 1971), Scottish singer-songwriter
- Karine Ruby (1978–2009), French snowboarder and Olympic champion
- Karine Saporta (born 1950), French choreographer, dancer, photographer, and short film director
- Karine Sergerie (born 1985), the 2007 world champion in women's 67 kg Taekwondo
- Karine Turcotte (born 1978), Canadian weightlifter
- Karine Vanasse (born 1983), French Canadian actress

== See also ==
- Karien
- Karine A, Palestinian freighter seized in the Red Sea
- Karinë, municipality in the Peqin District, Elbasan County in central Albania
- Karline
