= Katerina (disambiguation) =

Katerina is a feminine given name.

Katerina may also refer to:

- Katerina (The Vampire Diaries), an episode of the TV series The Vampire Diaries
- Katerina (magazine), a Greek girls' teenage magazine
