= Carina (yacht) =

Irish yacht

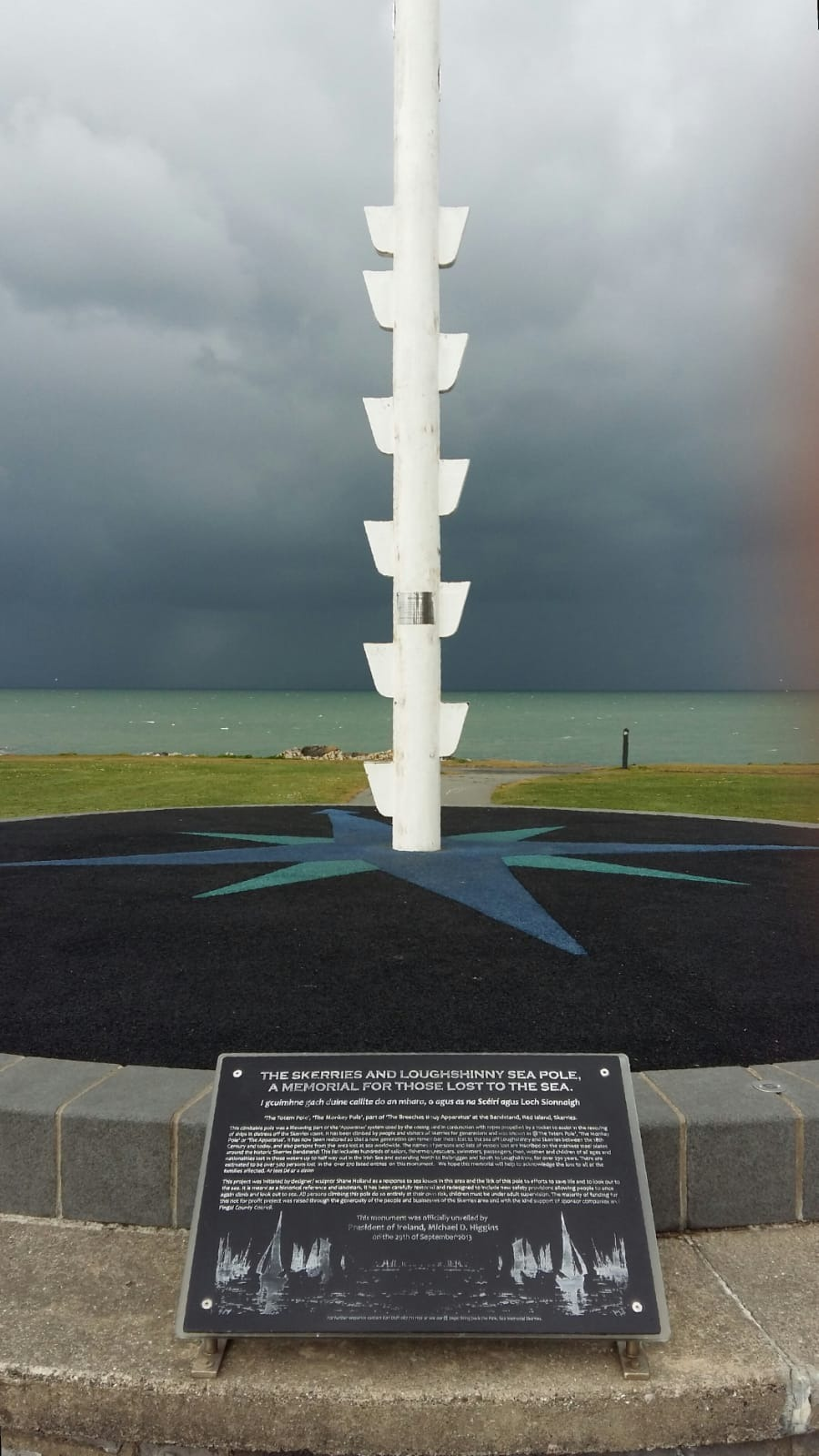
The two crew lost aboard the Carina, plus two other Carina crew lost aboard the Cymric, are remembered at the Skerries and Loughshinny Sea Pole Memorial.

Carina was a successful racing sailing yacht which disappeared off Howth Head on the Dublin coast in 1944 with two crew aboard, and is referenced in the Liam MacGabhann poem "Sailing Down the Bay" after two other members of her crew were also lost at sea on another boat. Carina sailed off scratch and regularly won or placed at Skerries Sailing Club races, and won the 1943 East Coast Championship of Ireland.

The boat was 21 feet long and Bermuda-rigged and part-owned by commercial traveller John 'Jack' McConnell of Rathgar, the 1942-43 captain of Old Wesley Rugby Football Club.

== Disappearance ==
=== Initial sailing ===
Carina sailed on a falling tide from Skerries about 1 p.m. on Monday, 2 October 1944. McConnell, 26, and crew Kenneth Martin, 23, were sailing her about 20 nautical miles south to lay her up for the Winter at Clontarf. It was expected the journey by sail could be completed within the day as the crew only carried sandwiches for sustenance.

The yacht was seen sailing by the Baily Lighthouse principal keeper in 'heavy weather' about 7.30pm, "trying to beat against a west-southwest wind which broke out of Dublin Bay". But that night the Carina had also been seen about three miles off Howth Head sailing north, the opposite direction to expected.

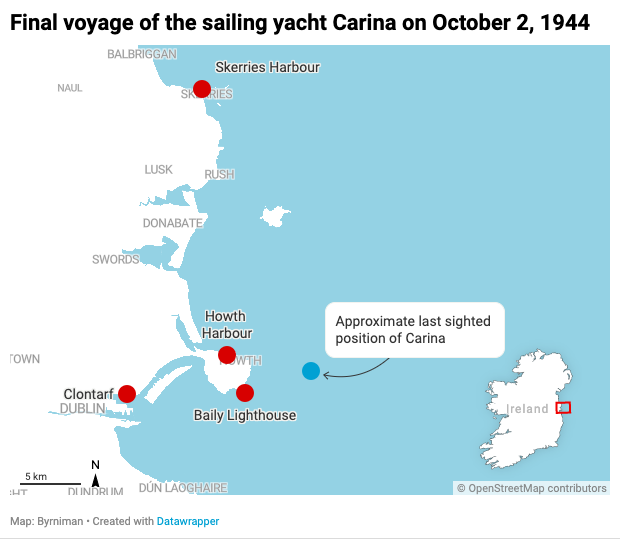
Map of the north Dublin coast showing Carina's estimated final sighting.

As the tide had turned northward by that point, it was suggested that rounding Howth Head and the Bailey would have created an unfavourable sea state, and Jack may have attempted a downwind return to Skerries.

It's unknown why they were so far off Howth Head and why they didn't sail for nearby protected Howth Harbour.

=== Delays ===
The disappearance went unnoticed, resulting in fatal delays in raising the alarm.

In Skerries, McConnell's parents believed Jack and Kenneth had gone to the home of crewman and Jack's brother-in-law Jack Bolton, but the sailors failed to arrive at Bolton's home, so Bolton concluded the boat had not yet sailed.

It was not until Tuesday night when both parties realised Jack, Kenneth, and Carina were missing from Skerries. At this point, the sailors were probably already lost. Crewmember Kenneth Martin was a marine radio operator by trade, but it would be unlikely a boat so small would have carried radio equipment.

=== Search ===
The Air Corps were only notified at 11am on Wednesday, 4 October, two days after Carina's departure.

The air and sea search was reported abandoned by first press Thursday, November 6, 1944, after the Air Corps, Aer Lingus, and Howth Lifeboat failed to find any evidence of the boat.

Lifeboat stations and ships were put on watch after that.

== Impact ==
Jack was the second son that John Kennedy and Sarah McConnell (née Cassidy) lost at sea that year. Jack's younger brother Cecil Frank McConnell was also an owner and a well-known sailor aboard Carina, and was lost when the working schooner Cymric disappeared at sea in February. Another Carina crewman, Peter Joseph "Perie" Seaver from Skerries, was also lost aboard the Cymric.

The lost Carina sailors are remembered on plaques on the Skerries and Loughshinny Sea Pole Memorial on Red Island, Skerries.

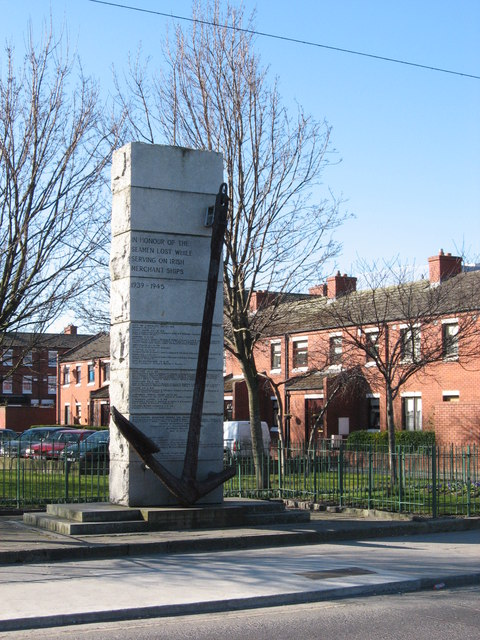
Carina sailors Cecil Frank McConnell and Peter Joseph “Perie” Seavers are remembered on the Irish Merchant Seaman's Memorial in Dublin.

Kenneth Martin is remembered on his parents' headstone in Mount Jerome Cemetery.

Jack McConnell's widow Christina McConnell née Kane, married 1939, was granted administration of her husband's estate by High Court judge Cahir Davitt in 1947.

== Legacy ==
A poem written by journalist and Skerries Sailing Club committee member Liam MacGabhann a year later, after VE Day, lamented the loss of local recreational sailors aboard Carina, Cymric, and other ships during World War II. The poem was displayed in Skerries Sailing Club and other east coast sailing clubs, and published in The Irish Press. The second-last verse is dedicated to the Carina and her crew:

And so we still set spinnakers, and make the runners fast,
And keep the good craft sailing still, though she be first or last
Yet scarce an evening passes but someone's sure to say.
"Ah, but to see Carina now, come sailing down the Bay".

— Liam MacGabhann, "Sailing Down the Bay" (1945)
