= Carine (given name) =

Carine is a feminine given name. Notable people with the name include:

- Cairine Wilson (1885–1962), Canadian senator
- Carine Adler (born 1948), Brazilian film director
- Carine Goren (born 1974), Israeli pastry chef, cookbook author, and television baking show host
- Carine Roitfeld (born 1954), French businesswoman, editor-in-chief of French Vogue (magazine)
- Carine Russo (born 1962), Belgian politician and a member of Ecolo
- Carine Mbuh Ndoum Yoh (born 1993), Cameroonian footballer
- Carine Tardieu (born 1973), French filmmaker
- Carine Quadros (born 1981), Brazilian actress
- Carine Mambou (born 1984), Cameroonian journalist writer and entrepreneur

== See also ==
- Carin
- Carina (name)
- Karine
