= Karena =

Karena is a given name. Notable people with the given name include:

- Karena Chapman, Australian chemist
- Karena Evans (born 1995), Canadian music video director and actress
- Karena Johnson, British theatrical director and producer
- Karena Bacchus, Canadian rapper, singer, and songwriter
- Karena Lam (born 1978), Taiwanese-Canadian, actress and singer
- Karena Ng (born 1993), Hong Kong actress and model.
- Karena Richardson (born 1959), British figure skater
- Karena Wihongi (born 1979), New Zealand rugby union footballer
