= Nyobolt =

Battery technology company

- Nyobolt logo used since 2018

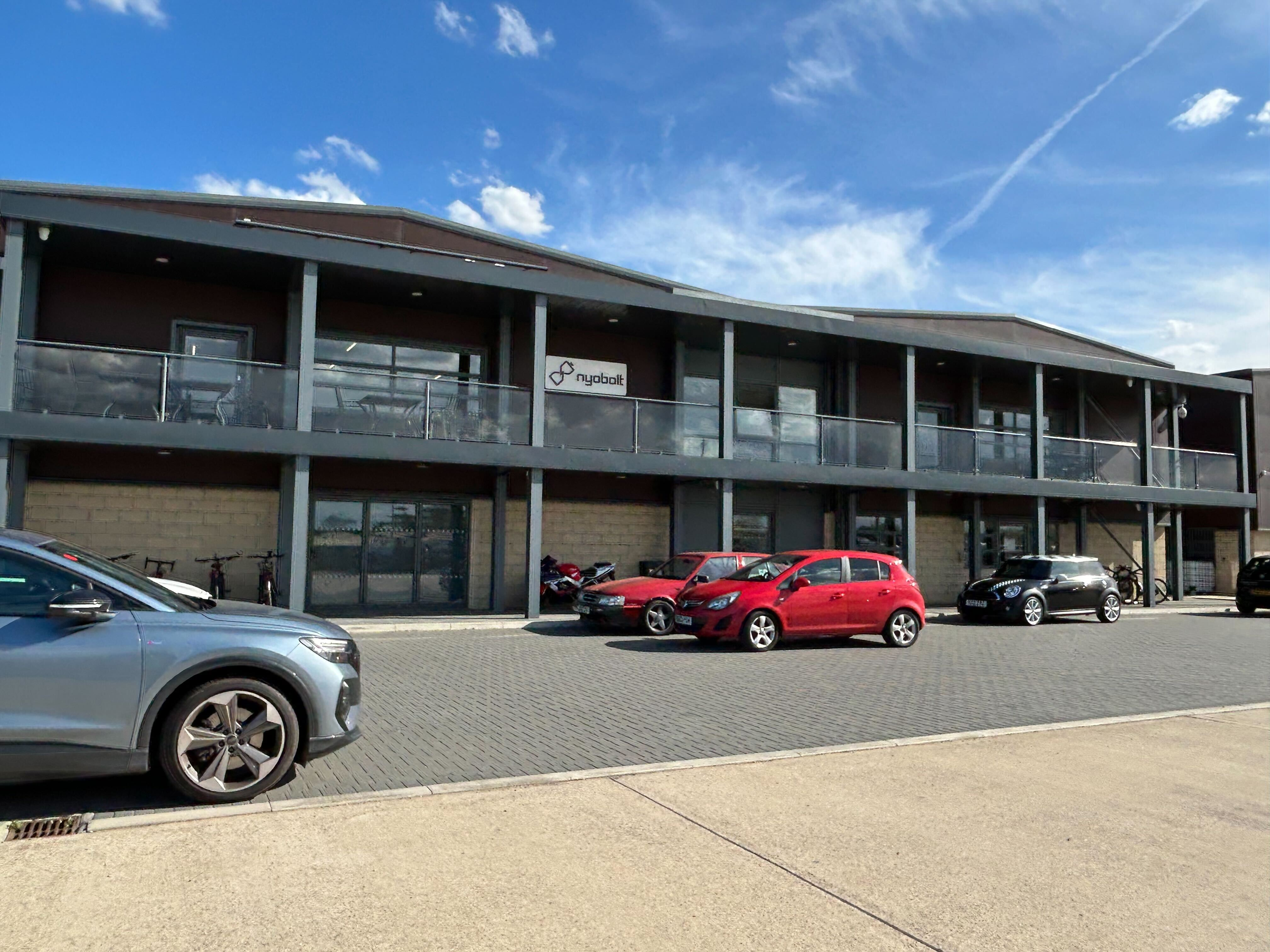
- The head office of Nyobolt in Cambridge UK
- Type: Private
- Industry: Electric Batteries Manufacturing
- Founded: 2019
- Founders: Professor Clare Grey and Dr. Sai Shivareddy
- Headquarters: Cambridge, United Kingdom
- Website: nyobolt.com

Nyobolt is a UK-based energy storage technology company that develops batteries and energy storage systems. The company’s solutions are tailored for applications that benefit from rapid charging and long operational life.

== History ==
Nyobolt was established in 2019 by Professor Clare Grey and Dr. Sai Shivareddy, following research into niobium-based anode materials at the University of Cambridge. The company initially focused on scaling its proprietary anode material and testing its integration into commercial cell manufacturing processes.

Over the following years, Nyobolt expanded its capabilities in battery systems and electronics, secured Series A and B funding rounds, and began pilot testing in high-power applications such as electric vehicles and industrial automation.

In 2019, Nyobolt established a research and development facility in the United States, and four years later in 2023, the company launched a production facility in the United Kingdom. That same year, the company unveiled an electric vehicle demonstrator capable of six-minute charging to demonstrate its technology.

== Battery technology model ==
Nyobolt develops high-power lithium-ion batteries utilising both niobium-based and graphite-based anodes designed for ultrafast charging, and long operational life. The company’s technology integrates materials science with battery cell engineering, power electronics, and system-level controls. Its batteries are intended for applications in electric vehicles, robotics, consumer electronics, and industrial tools where rapid charging and energy efficiency are key performance factors.

== Awards and recognitions ==
In March 2025, Nyobolt won the annual Start Up Energy Transition (SET100) Award in the category Mobility & Transportation, held by German Energy Agency (dena).

In summer 2025, Nyobolt was selected as a winner of Hyundai Motor Europe’s Open Innovation Challenge, organized in collaboration with HYUNDAI CRADLE and Plug and Play Tech Center.

== Customers and partnerships ==
In September 2025, Nyobolt announced that its high-power, ultra-fast charging battery technology is being integrated into Symbotic's fleet of autonomous mobile robots (AMRs). The system delivers six times more energy capacity while being 40% lighter than ultracapacitors and offers up to ten times the cycle life of conventional lithium-ion batteries. Symbotic began limited production use in June 2025 and will fully deploy the technology from September 2025. The module is retrofit compatible with earlier robot models and supports existing charging infrastructure.

== See also ==
- Clare Grey
- Lithium-ion battery
