= Carine Mambou =

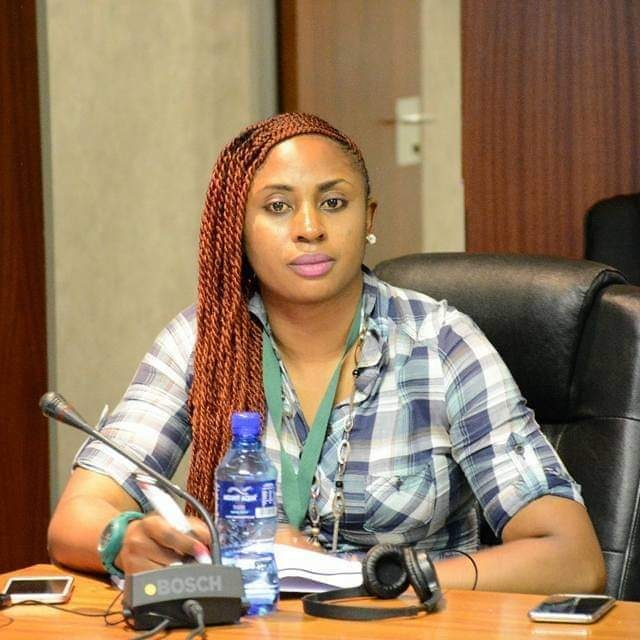
- Born: September 7, 1984 (age 42); Bafoussam

Carine Mambou, born September 7, 1984, in Bafoussam, Cameroon, is a journalist writer and entrepreneur. She is the founder of the NGO CAD AID Foundation created in 2017 and CEO of MEMA GROUP LTD.

== Biography and studies ==
Mambou is the fifth in a family of ten. At the age of sixteen, while she was in Junior Year mathematics and physics sciences, Mambou took her first steps in media on Poala FM radio in the show called Juvénile, with Léornard Chatelain. After two months at the public channel, she was auditioned at Radio Star, a private media channel in Bafoussam and spent two years there. During her time in this media, she presented, among others, the shows HIP-HOP, Musiquinine, designed and presented the socio-cultural magazine MBOA NATAL and was also a sports reporter in addition to supervising young interns. More recently, she has made appearances on other radio channels, including SKY ONE Radio, LE DÉMENTI and many others.

After obtaining her Baccalaureate C, she joined Yaoundé, the capital of her country where she concealed both her studies and work. She studied at the Faculty of Science at the University of Yaoundé, initially with a mathematics option, then at the Institut Siantou Supérieur, with a finance and accounting option.

== Professional career ==
In 2008, Mambou was recruited as a Radio and TV presenter for VISION 4 and SATELLITE FM television from the Groupe l’Anecdote. She became the presenter of the wake-up show called La Matinale, with Alain Kovich as co-presenter. Subsequently, she designed and presented the tourist program called NGOUON. Within the same group, she presents the radio program called pastèque on Satellite FM.

Mambou left the group in 2011, took a break and was contacted the following year by Kora FM radio where she presented the show called Sweet Time. After Kora FM, she joined Afrik2 as part of the program ça ne peut que faire du bien with Francis Jamel Laplage and Général Valsero as well as 14h Media with Chris Bobby. In October 2017, with her media WIHIA News and serving the Pan-African Parliament, Mambou provided extensive media coverage of the Fifth Ordinary Session of the Fourth Parliament at the headquarters of the Pan-African Parliament in Midrand, South Africa. The same year, she was invited as a panelist as Success Story and Challenges during the first capacity building workshop organized by the African Union/CIEFFA at the headquarters of the African Union in Addis Ababa, Ethiopia.

In 2016 she created MEMA GROUP to consolidate her four companies into one, including WIHIA News (www.wihianews.com), CAD Agency, CAD Aid Foundation (www.cad-aid.org) and CAD Publishing.

In 2018, Mambou was ranked the second woman to have marked Cameroon through her activities in the magazine Femmes Update. The same year, she served as CHA'S and FGM Ambassador with Akidwa in the Republic of Ireland. Subsequently, she was chosen as the French-speaking Africa ambassador to the African Union/CIEFFA (international centre for the education of women and girls in Africa) for the #AfricaEducatesHer campaign.

In 2019, she was Focal Point of the United Nations Migration Agency (IOM) and Member of the Advisory and executive committee of the Clare Women's Network, an organization that promotes the values of women in County Clare in the Republic of Ireland. Mambou obtained the IDEAL Leadership Award organized by Akidwa in Dublin, Ireland.

In 2020, she received first prize in the category Best Entrepreneur with an international footprint in Johannesburg, South Africa during the 8th edition of the CWENA Awards. She also received certification from Emerging Leaders organized by Common Purpose in Dublin. Since 2018, Mambou has participated in more than 80 conferences, panellist of more than 60, co-organizer of more than 50 and organizer of 3 festivals and 10 conferences in Africa and Europe.

== Selected works ==
- 2017 ː Books My Version of the Facts and Ma Version Des Faits published by profounder.,
- 2021: Editor of the books Débout and This weakness, my Strength! And my dreams come true via CAD Publishing,
- 2023: Tourism & Business “Create without Capital, Explore with Passion” currently being published,
- 2023: My Feminism is a Humanism currently being published.

== Selected awards and recognitions ==
- 2020 ː Best NGO with CAD AID Foundation in Ireland
- 2020 ː First prize CWENA Awards for the best entrepreneur with an international footprint
- 2022 : Third CWENA Awards for best entrepreneur with an international footprint
