= Clare Grey =

British chemist and Professor of Chemistry

Dame Clare Grey DBE FRS
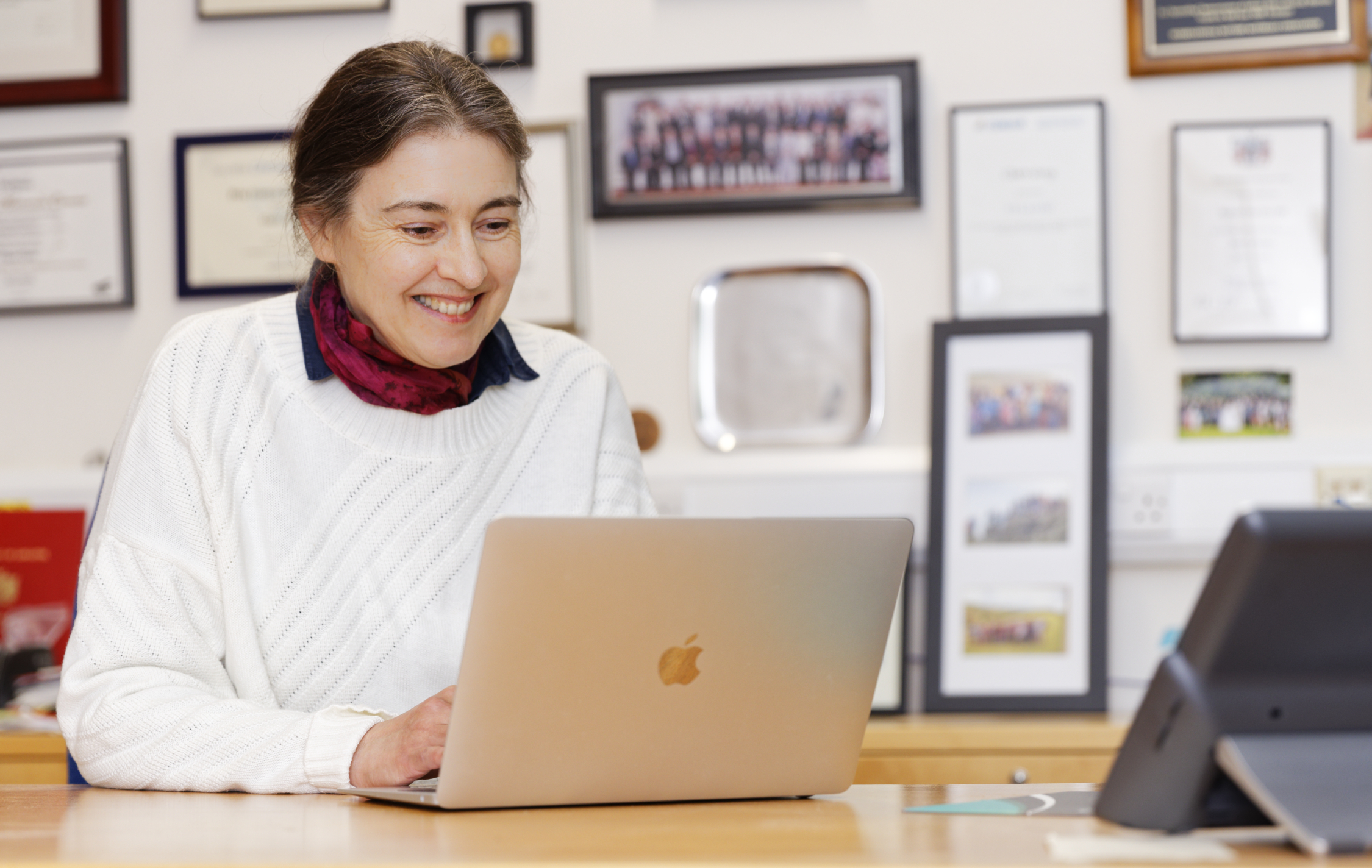
- Born: Clare Philomena Grey; March 17, 1965 (age 61)
- Education: University of Oxford (BA, DPhil)
- Awards: Kavli Medal (2011); Günther Laukien Prize (2013); Davy Medal (2014)
- Scientific career
- Fields: Chemistry; Materials
- Workplaces: University of Cambridge; Stony Brook University; Radboud University Nijmegen; DuPont
- Thesis: A ^{119}Sn and ^{89}Y MAS NMR study of rare-Earth pyrochlores (1991)
- Doctoral advisor: Anthony Cheetham
- Website: www.ch.cam.ac.uk/person/cpg27

Dame Clare Philomena Grey DBE FRS is Geoffrey Moorhouse Gibson Professor in the Department of Chemistry at the University of Cambridge and a Fellow of Pembroke College, Cambridge. Grey uses nuclear magnetic resonance spectroscopy to study and optimize batteries.

== Education ==
Grey received a Bachelor of Arts degree in 1987 followed by a Doctor of Philosophy degree in chemistry in 1991, both from the University of Oxford. Her doctoral thesis, under the supervision of Sir Anthony Cheetham, used nuclear magnetic resonance (NMR) spectroscopy and magic angle spinning (MAS) to study rare-earth pyrochlores.

== Career and research ==
Following Grey's graduate studies, she held a postdoctoral research position at the University of Nijmegen. From 1992 to 1993, she worked as a visiting researcher at DuPont. In 1994, Grey was appointed a professor at the State University of New York at Stony Brook, and became full professor in 2001. In 2009, she became the Geoffrey Moorhouse Gibson Professor in Materials Chemistry at the University of Cambridge.

From 2009 to 2010 she was the Director of the Northeastern Chemical Energy Storage Center, and Associate Director from 2011 to 2014. She is current the director of the EPSRC Centre for Advanced Materials for Integrated Systems.

=== Battery research ===
Grey pioneered the application of nuclear magnetic resonance to study and improve the performance of batteries, particularly lithium ion batteries. She also made major contributions to the development of lithium-air batteries.

Grey is co-founder of Nyobolt, a company which specializes in niobium-based batteries.

=== Honours and awards ===
Grey was elected a Fellow of the Royal Society (FRS) in 2011 and awarded the Günther Laukien Prize in 2013 followed by the Davy Medal in 2014 for "further pioneering applications of solid state nuclear magnetic resonance to materials of relevance to energy and the environment."

She was appointed Dame Commander of the Order of the British Empire (DBE) in the 2022 Birthday Honours for services to science.

In December 2013, Grey was awarded an Honorary Doctorate by Lancaster University.

Other awards, honours and career highlights include:

- 2008 Vaughan Lecturer
- 2010 John Jeyes Award from the Royal Society of Chemistry
- 2011 Kavli Medal
- 2013 Günther Laukien Prize
- 2015 Arfvedson-Schlenk Award, for outstanding scientific and technical achievements in lithium chemistry
- 2017 Prix Franco-Britannique from the Société Chimique de France
- 2018 Interviewed by Jim Al-Khalili for The Life Scientific on BBC Radio 4 first broadcast March 2018
- 2019 Royal Society of Chemistry John B. Goodenough Award
- 2020 Royal Society Hughes Medal
- 2021 Körber European Science Prize
