= Liam MacGabhann =

Irish journalist (1908–1979)

- Born: William Cyprian Smith; 16 September 1908; Valentia Island, County Kerry, Ireland
- Died: 16 January 1979 (aged 70); St. Vincents Hospital, Dublin, Ireland
- Occupation: Journalist
- Years active: 1930–1977
- Spouse(s): Phenie (Tryphena) Franklin (1938–1979, his death)
- Children: Jack, Dorothy and Richard

Liam MacGabhann (born William Cyprian Smith) (1908–1979) was an Irish journalist born at Laharan, Valentia Island, County Kerry in 1908.

He married Phenie (Tryphena) Franklin (b. 1917 Middlesbrough, England) and had three children Jack, Richard and Dorothy. Having started his career as a national school teacher on Valentia, he attended an interview for a post as film critic for the Irish Press. He was honest about his lack of knowledge, explaining that he had only heard of Greta Garbo and had been to a Mickey Mouse film, he was given the job anyway.

MacGabhann worked for The Irish Press, was Irish editor The People Newspaper (1956), News Editor of The Irish Times, worked for This Week magazine and was one of the founding editors of the Sunday World. He died after a series of strokes in 1979 in Dublin.

- Travelled to America with Éamon de Valera on a Fianna Fáil fundraising tour.
- Travelled to several times to Hollywood – Hollywood Reporter
- An Phoblacht
- Asgard Sail training ship found by MacGabhann on banks of River Truro, Cornwall and after lobbying for it to be bought back by the nation it was sailed back to Howth on 29 July 1961. It was laid up in the coal harbour for funding reasons until 1969 when keen Yachtsman and future Taoiseach (Prime Minister) Charles J. Haughey along with others had her established as Ireland's Sail Training ship.
- Topical Talks on RTÉ radio.
- Documentary on Valentia
- Interviews John Wayne in Cong at filming of The Quiet Man
- Interviews Tyrone Power / Maureen O'Sullivan in the Irish Press.
- Rags Robes and Rebels – book of poems
- Visits USSR with Anthony Cronin and James Plunkett

== Connolly poem ==
James Connolly – Poem by Liam MacGabhann The poem was written by Liam MacGabhann. He wrote in "Rags, Robes and Rebels" that it was based on reading comments made by the son of a Welsh miner who was part of Connolly's firing squad who later asked Connolly's relatives to forgive him.

Connolly

The man was all shot through that came today

Into the barrack square;

A soldier I – I am not proud to say

We killed him there;

They brought him from the prison hospital;

To see him in that chair

I thought his smile would far more quickly call

A man to prayer.

Maybe we cannot understand this thing

That makes these rebels die;

And yet all things love freedom – and the Spring

Clear in the sky;

I think I would not do this deed again

For all that I hold by;

Gaze down my rifle at his breast – but then

A soldier I.

They say that he was kindly – different too,

Apart from all the rest;

A lover of the poor; and all shot through,

His wounds ill drest,

He came before us, faced us like a man,

He knew a deeper pain

Than blows or bullets – ere the world began;

Died he in vain?

Ready – present; And he just smiling – God!

I felt my rifle shake

His wounds were opened out and round that chair

Was one red lake;

I swear his lips said 'Fire!' when all was still

Before my rifle spat

That cursed lead – and I was picked to kill

A man like that!

VALENTIA
I can hear the wild music of river and fall.
But the breezes are bearing a soft, gentle call.
It's calling me home, 'tis sweet singing stream.
That flows thro' the woodland of lovely Glanleam.
Ah, my heart is nigh breaking with longing and pain.
Dear home! Will you comfort your exile again?
In dawning's clear brightness, in evening's soft gloam.
There's no place on earth like my own Island home.
Liam MacGabhann 1932

Blind Man at Croke Park
Listen, asthore, for these eyes are sealed,
Listen once more, when Kerrymen take the field,
Tell an old man who saw them in days of old,
Do they walk proudly in their green and gold?

Listen, asthore, when Kerry take the field,
Tell me when they attack and when they yield;
Say if they fail; asthore, I'm blind and old,
Tell me they'll not dishonour the green and gold.'
