= Karina Bachey =

Argentine politician

Member of the Chamber of Deputies of Argentina
- Incumbent
- Assumed office 10 December 2021

Personal details
- Born: December 7, 1974 (age 51)
- Party: Republican Proposal
- Occupation: Accountant

Karina Bachey is an Argentine politician who is a member of the Chamber of Deputies of Argentina

== Biography ==
She worked as an accountant before she was elected in 2021.
