= Katerina (magazine) =

Greek magazine (1973–2014)

Katerina was a Greek girls' teenage magazine which was first issued in 1973. It was one of the longest-living publications of its kind in Greece, being published by Anemodouras publishing house. Katerina was the first pocket size weekly magazine of its kind in Greece. It offered articles on astrology, health, beauty, fashion, relationships and other. Together with its sister publication Super Katerina it stopped being published in 2014.

Super Katerina and its competitor, Manina, were very popular with the female teenage population of Greece. During its existence that spanned 4 decades, some publications tried to compete with Katerina, without success.

== History ==
The person that spearheaded the creation of the magazine was the magazine's namesake, Katerina Rossiou-Anemodoura, wife of Giorgos Anemodouras (son of Stelios Anemodouras), the CEO of the publishing company Periodikos Typos. The magazine was also created to create a competitor to the magazine Manina, which had been in circulation since 1972.

Rossiou-Anemodoura had aspired to work with magazines since her childhood, and studied graphic arts and history of art in Doxiadis school. She also attended the Athens School of Fine Arts.

Rossiou-Anemodoura had a good personal and corporate relationship with her father-in-law. She was the person that proposed to create a version of the Greek edition of Il Grande Blek aimed to a young female population.

Stelios Anemodouras proposed that the name of his daughter-in-law be used for the name of the magazine. Rossiou-Anemodoura asked the board of directors of Periodikos Typos company to decide for the name of the magazine, and the board decided that her name should be used as the name of the magazine.

The magazine was focused on a teenage demographic. It published comics aimed to young girls, novels in segments, games, fashion-related articles, and many more things.

== Super Katerina ==
Super Katerina was the monthly edition of Katerina and began to be published in 1979. Super Katerina focused to teenage people between the ages of 10 and 19, while Katerina focused to people in the ages of 14 and 16. Super Katerina had articles about the relations of teenagers, about friendship, flirting, health, beauty, fashion issues and often published articles about the careers and the news of celebrities, both domestic and foreign. Super Katerina's origin was the Afisorama magazine (which was first issued in 1977) as Rossiou-Anemodoura perceived the need of Katerina's readers for a magazine with more content.

The magazine's pages were initially black and white, except for the main pages which were decorated with posters. Some of the most important articles of each issue were printed in color.

Super Katerina began offering iron types of famous actors and other artists as a supplement in 1980. In 1989, Super Katerina's 180 pages began to be fully issued in color. Previously, only 50 pages were printed in color and the rest in black and white.

Super Katerina was aimed to both girls and boys, but in 1995 Rossiou-Anemodoura decided to fully focus the magazine to a teen female demographic. Often the magazine was sold together with small gifts such as bracelets and other jewellery. Super Katerina sold approximately 60,000 copies in each issue.

Super Katerina had columnists and writers of various ages. Many well-known people in Greece collaborated with the magazine, contributing articles for it.

=== Popularity ===
John Travolta was featured in the cover of the first issue of Super Katerina. Super Katerina's first issue sold 140,000 issues throughout Greece. Its issues often sold more than 70,000 copies. One of the most successful issues of the magazine was an issue with a cover of the Spice Girls, selling 113,000 copies. According to a 2024 interview of Rossiou-Anemodoura, the magazine had very high amounts of sales since its inception and many people were sending letters to the editorial team of the magazine, sharing their thoughts on various personal issues they faced, and other things. The readers' letters were being answered by psychologists who collaborated with the magazine. Also, after the letters were being answered, the letters themselves were being shredded, in order to avoid exposing the personal data of those who had sent them.
