= Karina Grömer =

Austrian archaeologist (born 1974)

- Born: 1974 (age 51–52)
- Education: University of Vienna
- Occupation: Archaeologist
- Known for: Archaeological textiles

Karina Grömer (born 1974) is an Austrian archaeologist known for her contribution to the study of archaeological textiles. She is the head of the Department of Prehistory at the Natural History Museum Vienna in Austria.

== Education and career ==
Grömer studied prehistoric archaeology, anthropology, history and ethnology at the University of Vienna, Department of Prehistory and Historical Archaeology in Austria. During her studies she was a member of excavation teams in Austria, France, Croatia and Poland, excavating settlements and cemeteries, covering a time-span between Neolithic and Roman Period. She is engaged with studies in material culture, especially Neolithic, Bronze and Iron Age in Central and Eastern Central Europe. In her research methodology, she is working in an interdisciplinary research context to set artefacts into a wider chronological and supra-regional framework. Theoretical approaches used for her studies are about identity, innovation and creativity, functional design theory, visual coding, design concepts, sociological and semiotic studies.

In 2007 she wrote her doctoral thesis about the Bronze Age textile finds from Hallstatt (Bronzezeitliche Gewebefunde aus Hallstatt und die Entwicklung der Textiltechnologie zur Eisenzeit) and in 2019 her Habilitation at the University of Vienna in 2019 “Archaeological Textile Research - Technical, economic and social aspects of textile production and clothing from Neolithic to the Early Modern Era”.

Since 2008 she has been working for international and interdisciplinary research projects at the Department of Prehistory at the Natural History Museum Vienna. Her current research focuses on the analysis of textiles from graves and salt-mines, covering a time span from 2000 BC to 1000 AD and a geographical area from Central Europe to Iran.

Grömer is a member of HEAS Team Leaders, HEAS is the Human Evolution and Archaeological Sciences Consortium in Austria and Board Member of Council for Austrian Archaeology.

== Public outreach ==
In November 2020 she won the Austrian Science Slam with the performance "Hallstatt It Girl with Soundeffect".

She teaches at the University of Vienna, Institute for Prehistory and Historical Archaeology, and acts as visiting lecturer at the University Cambridge (GB), University Southampton (GB) and the Mazaryk University Brno (CZ), where she holds lectures about textile archaeology and experimental archaeology.

She is the author of 9 monographs (4 peer-reviewed), 14 edited volumes (7 peer-reviewed); 82 journal articles (46 peer-reviewed); 121 book chapters (59 peer-reviewed) and numerous miscellaneous publications including popular science.

She is the main editor of four archaeological–anthropological periodicals in Austria (Archäologie Österreichs (until 2010); Mitteilungen der Anthropologischen Gesellschaft in Wien, Archäologie Online Hallstatt; Prähistorische Forschungen Online) and member of the editorial board of Annalen des Naturhistorischen Museums Wien Serie A, Archaeological Textiles Review at the Centre for Textile Research Copenhagen.

== International research projects ==
Years	Projects
2020 - 2024	COST Action EuroWeb - Europe Through Textiles: Network for an integrated and interdisciplinary Humanities (Project proposer: Marie-Louise Nosch, Univ. Copenhagen; Chair: Agata Ulanowska, University of Warsaw, Poland; Vice-chair: Karina Grömer, NHM Wien) COST - European Cooperation in Science and Technology, Grant Nr. CA19131.
2018 - 2020	Project Gerda Henkel Stiftung: Die Salzmänner Irans - Das Kulturerbe des Salzmumien-Museums in Zanjan (Projectleader: Thomas Stöllner, Ruhr-Universität Bochum, Deutsches Bergbaumuseum Bochum in Deutschland; Markus Egg, Römisch-Germanisches Zentralmuseum in Mainz; Wolfgang David, Museum Frankfurt; Abolfazl Aali, Archaeological Museum Zanjan in Iran; Position Grömer: Research partner) Funded by Gerda Henkel Stiftung, Grant Number: AZ 07/BE/17.
2015 - 2017	DFG Project Saltmen Iran - Chehrabad Saltmummy & Saltmine Exploration Project (Project manager: Abolfazl Aali, Archaeological Museum Zanjan in Iran; Thomas Stöllner, Ruhr-Universität Bochum, Deutsches Bergbaumuseum Bochum in Germany; Position Grömer: Research partner) Funded by Deutsche Forschungsgemeinschaft DFG, Grant Number STO 458/12-2.
2010 - 2013	CinBA: Creativity and Craft Production in Middle and Late Bronze Age Europe (Project manager: Joanna Sofaer, University of Southampton in UK; Position Grömer: Co PI, Research partner) Funded by HERA - Humanities in the European Research Area. Grant Number: 09-HERA-JRP-CI-FP-020.
2008 - 2011	HallTex FWF: Dyeing techniques of the prehistoric textiles from the salt mine of Hallstatt (Project manager: Regina Hofmann-de Keijzer, Universität für Angewandte Kunst, Institut für Kunst und Technologie/Archäometrie in Austria; Position Grömer: Research partner) Funded by FWF (Fonds zur Förderung Wissenschaftlicher Forschung Austria/Austrian Science Fund), Translational - Research - Program, Grant Number L431-G02.
2007 - 2012	DressID Clothing and Identities - New Perspectives on Textiles in the Roman Empire (Project manager: Michael Tellenbach, Curt-Engelhorn-Stiftung für die Reiss-Engelhorn-Museen Mannheim in Germany; Position Grömer: Research partner) Funding: EU Commission, "Culture" Program. Grant Number x2007-1765/001-001 CTU-COOPMU.

== Selected publications ==
- Grömer, K., Gleba, M. & Van Horne, S. (2023): Textiles burning: Understanding charred textiles from cremation graves and experimental charring. In: Sanna Lipkin, Erika Ruhl and Krista Wright (Hrsg.): proceedings "Interdisciplinary Approaches to Research of North and Central European Archaeological Textiles". Monographs of the Archaeological Society of Finland 12, 2023, 309-322.
- Grömer, K. (2022): Textiles and human needs. A discussion about textile production in the Hallstatt Culture. In: A. Dickey, M. Gleba, S. Hitchens, G. Longhitano (eds): Exploring Ancient Textiles. Pushing the Boundaries of Established Methodologies. Oxbow Books, Oxford and Philadelphia, 131-140.
- Ulanowska, A., Grömer, K., Vanden Berghe, I. & Öhrmann, M. (ed.) 2022, “Ancient Textile Production from an Interdisciplinary Approach: Humanities and Natural Sciences Interwoven for our Understanding of Textiles”, Interdisciplinary Contributions to Archaeology. Springer 2022. ISBN 978-3-030-92169-9, https://doi.org/10.1007/978-3-030-92170-5 30.4.22 (Edited volume)
- Moskvin, A., Grömer, K., Moskvina, M., Kuzmichev, V., Stöllner, Th. & Aali, A. (2022), 3D visualization of the 2400-year-old garments of Salt man 4 from Chehrābād, Iran. In: K. Grömer, Ina Vanden Berghe, Magdalena Öhrmann (ed.), “Ancient Textile Production from an Interdisciplinary Approach: Humanities and Natural Sciences Interwoven for our Understanding of Textiles”, Springer 2022, 319-338.
- Fernández-Götz, M. & Grömer, K. (2021): Making cities, producing textiles; The Late Hallstatt Fürstensitze. In: M. Gleba, B. Marín-Aguilera, B. Dimova (eds): Making cities. Economies of production and urbanization in Mediterranean Europe, 1000-500 BC. University of Cambridge, McDonald Institute Conversations, 329-343 (ISBN 978-1-913344-06-1). DOI: https://doi.org/10.17863/CAM.76148
- Grömer, K. & Ullermann, M. (2020): Functional Analysis of Garments in 18th Century Burials from St. Michael’s Crypt in Vienna, Austria. In: Acta Universitatis Lodziensis, Folia Archaeologica; edited by Magdalena Majorek, Olgierd Ławrynowicz; 2020, vol. 35, Published by Łódź University Press (Poland). ISSN: 0208-6034; e-ISSN: 2449-8300.
- Grömer, K. (2021): “Tablet weaving is a small byway of textile production...” Bronze and Iron Age tablet bands with stripes, meanders and triangles from the salt mines in Austria. In: F. Pritchard (ed): Crafting Textiles. Tablet weaving, Sprang, lace and other techniques from the Bronze Age to the early 17th century. Ancient Textiles Series 39. Oxford and Philadelphia: Oxbow Books, 3-21.
- K. Grömer, A. Kern, A. Kroh (2019): Critical Assessment of Media Stations in the Permanent Exhibition of the Natural History Museum Vienna: Prehistory and Palaeontology. In: W. Börner and S. Uhlirz (ed.): Proceedings of the 23rd International Conference on Cultural Heritage and New Technologies 2018. CHNT 23, 2018 (Vienna 2019). ISBN 978-3-200-06576-5
- K. Grömer and A. Kern (eds.) (2018): Artifacts. Treasures of the Millennia. A Guide through the Prehistoric Collection. Natural History Museum Vienna Exhibition guide. Wien 2018: Verlag des Naturhistorischen Museums.
- K. Grömer (2016): The Art of Prehistoric Textile Making – The development of craft traditions and clothing in Central Europe. Veröffentlichungen der Prähistorischen Abteilung 5, Verlag des Naturhistorischen Museums Wien, Vienna 2016.
- K. Grömer and F. Pritchard (eds.) (2015): Aspects of the Design, Production and Use of Textiles and Clothing from the Bronze Age to the Early Modern Era. NESAT XII. The North European Symposium for Archaeological Textiles, 21 – 24 May 2014 in Hallstatt, Austria. Archaeolingua Main Series 33. Budapest 2015.
- K. Grömer (2014): Römische Textilien in Noricum und Westpannonien - im Kontext der archäologischen Gewebefunde 2000 v. Chr. - 500 n. Chr. in Österreich. Austria Antiqua, Graz 2014.
- K. Grömer, A. Kern, H. Reschreiter and H. Rösel-Mautendorfer (Hrsg.) (2013): Textiles from Hallstatt. Weaving culture in Bronze and Iron Age Salt Mines. Archaeolingua 29, Budapest 2013.
- K. Grömer (2010): Prähistorische Textilkunst. Geschichte des Handwerks und der Kleidung vor den Römern. Veröffentlichungen der Prähistorischen Abteilung 4, Wien 2010.
