= Karena Chapman =

Australian chemist

Karena W Chapman
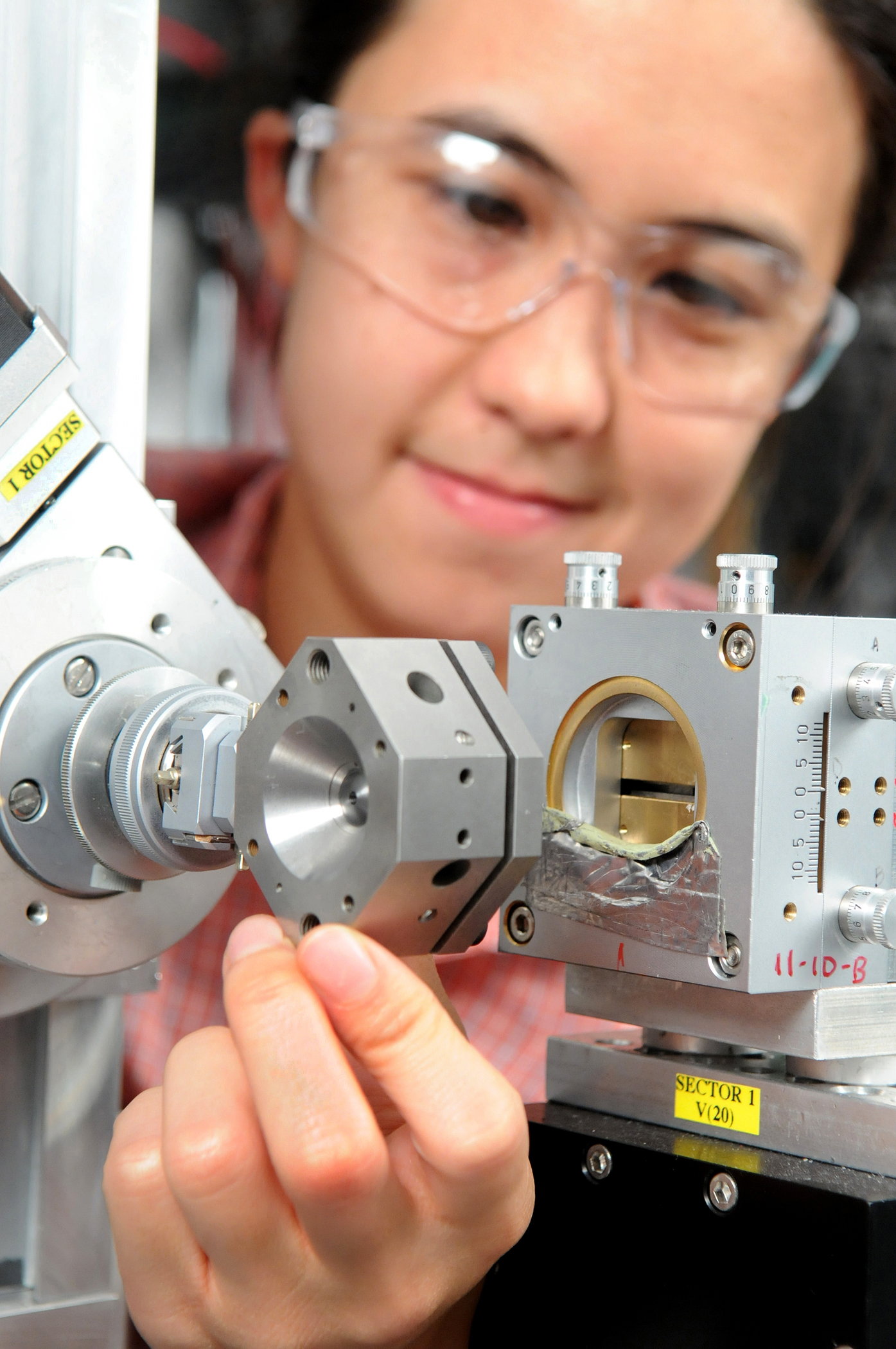
- Chapman examines the diamond anvil pressure cell at the Advanced Photon Source in 2008.
- Education: University of Sydney
- Scientific career
- Workplaces: Stony Brook University
- Thesis: Cyanide-bridged molecular framework materials: negative thermal expansion and host-guest properties (2005)

Karena Chapman is an Australian chemist who is the Joseph W Lauher & Frank W Fowler Endowed Chair in Materials Chemistry at Stony Brook University. Her research considers the use of high energy X-rays to better understand the structure property relationships of energy materials.

== Early life and education ==
Chapman was an undergraduate student at the University of Sydney. She remained in Australia for doctoral research, studying molecular framework materials. During her PhD, Chapman completed her crystallography measurements at Argonne National Laboratory. Chapman then joined the Argonne National Laboratory as an Arthur Holly Compton Fellow.

== Research and career ==
Chapman joined the high energy X-ray beamline of the X-ray science division at the Argonne National Laboratory in 2009. She developed approaches to better understand the structures of materials during operation. For example, she is interested in what's happening to the structure of batteries during charging/discharging. After nine years at Argonne, Chapman joined the faculty at Stony Brook University, where she was appointed the Joseph Lauher and Frank Fowler Endowed Chair in Materials Chemistry. She directs a centre focused on energy research, part of the United States Department of Energy Energy Frontier Research Centers.

Chapman's research considers the development of new materials for batteries, catalysis and gas capture. She has worked on the development of high X-ray based fidelity tools to identify structure-property relationships in these materials.

== Personal life ==
Chapman has said that her role model is Clare Grey.

== Awards and honours ==
- 2012 American Physical Society Spotless Award
- 2015 Materials Research Society Outstanding Young Investigator Award
- 2016 C&E News Talented Twelve
- 2021 Appointed Senior Editor at American Chemical Society Letters
- 2022 International Centre for Diffraction Data Hanawalt Award

== Selected publications ==
- Yan-Yan Hu; Zigeng Liu; Kyung-Wan Nam; et al. (3 November 2013). "Origin of additional capacities in metal oxide lithium-ion battery electrodes". Nature Materials. 12 (12): 1130–1136. doi:10.1038/nmat3784. ISSN 1476-1122. PMID 24185759. Wikidata Q57956995.
- Hao Liu; Fiona C Strobridge; Olaf J Borkiewicz; Kamila M Wiaderek; Karena W Chapman; Peter J Chupas; Clare Grey (1 June 2014). "Batteries. Capturing metastable structures during high-rate cycling of LiFePO₄ nanoparticle electrodes". Science. 344 (6191) 1252817. doi:10.1126/science.1252817. ISSN 0036-8075. PMID 24970091. Wikidata Q59725106.
- Ali Abouimrane; Damien Dambournet; Karena W. Chapman; Peter J. Chupas; Wei Weng; Khalil Amine (29 February 2012). "A new class of lithium and sodium rechargeable batteries based on selenium and selenium-sulfur as a positive electrode". Journal of the American Chemical Society. 134 (10): 4505–4508. doi:10.1021/ja211766q. ISSN 0002-7863. PMID 22364225. Wikidata Q83510209.
