= Carina Rydberg =

Swedish writer (born 1962)

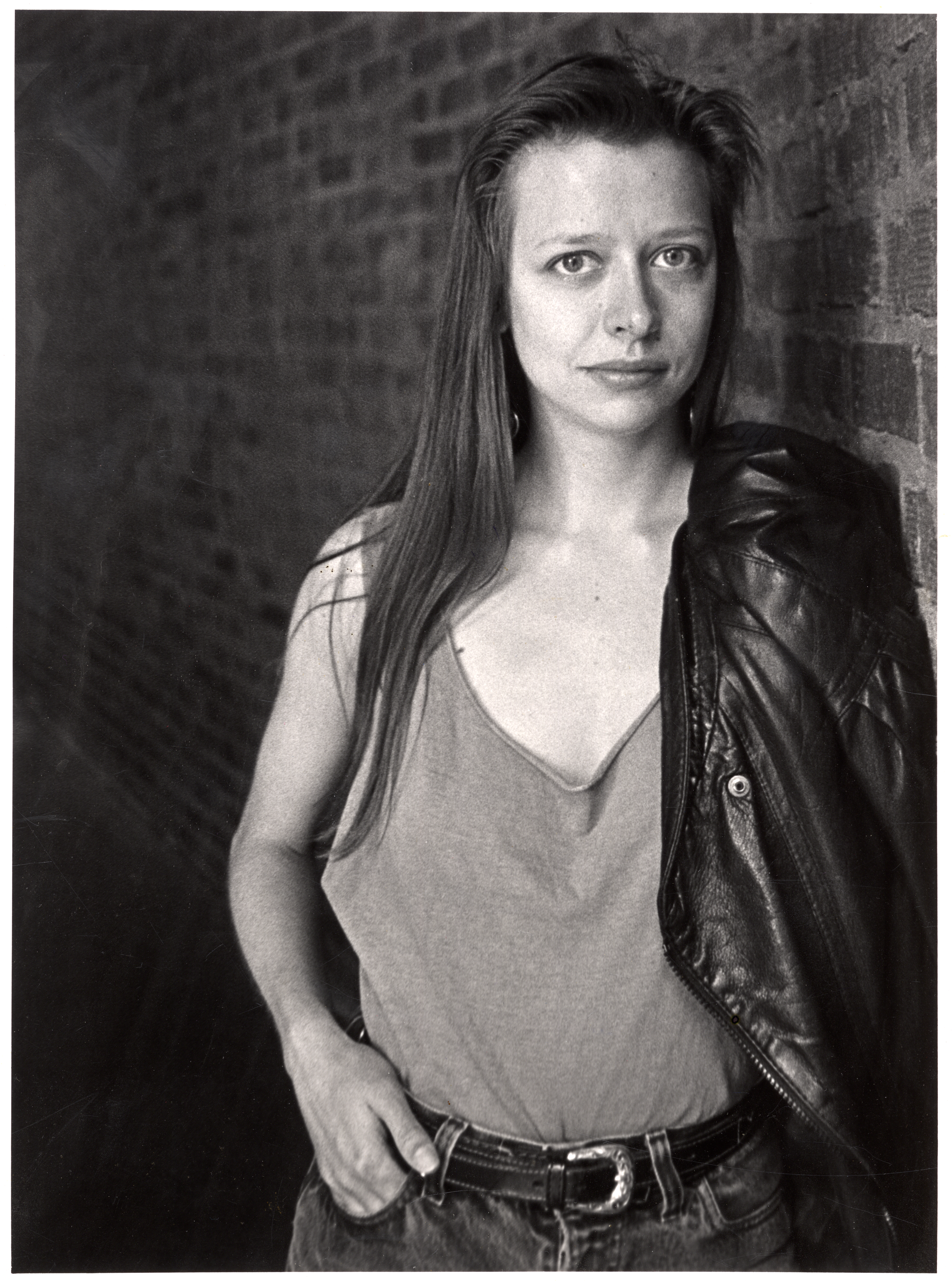
Carina Rydberg, 1985.

Carina Rydberg (born 18 July 1962) is a Swedish writer. She caused a scandal in 1997 when she included unflattering descriptions of two famous Swedish men in her autobiographical novel Den högsta kasten (The Highest Caste).

== Biography ==
Born in Stockholm, she grew up in the suburbs of Rågsved and Vårberg. After studying film, psychology and literature at Stockholm University, in 1987 she published her first novel Kallare än Kargil (Colder than Kargil) about a disillusioned woman's travels in India.

Her autobiographical Den högsta kasten (The Highest Caste) published in 1997 caused a sensation with unflattering accounts of two famous Swedes she named in the book. Describing how it feels to be an outcast rejected by the men she desires, the novel goes far beyond what is normally expected of the author's role. Similarly her Djävulsformeln (Devil's Formula, 2000) contains a vendetta against a number of famous men.

Rydberg was the screenwriter for Svart Lucia (1992), a psychological thriller. Carina Rydberg is the recipient of the 2023 Stig Dagerman Award.

== Works ==
- 1987: Kallare än Kargil
- 1989: Månaderna utan R
- 1990: Osalig ande
- 1994: Nattens amnesti
- 1997: Den högsta kasten
- 2000: Djävulsformeln
- 2006: Den som vässar vargars tänder

== Awards ==
- De Nios Vinterpris 2008
