= Karina Vismara =

Argentine singer and songwriter (1990–2022)

- Born: 1990; Balcarce, Buenos Aires, Argentina
- Died: 10 August 2022 (aged 31–32) Buenos Aires, Argentina
- Genres: Folk; rock; electronic
- Occupations: Singer; songwriter
- Instruments: Vocals; guitar; piano

Karina Denise Vismara (1990 – 10 August 2022) was an Argentine singer and songwriter.

== Biography ==
Vismara was born in Balcarce in 1990. In her childhood she received a keyboard as a gift, and from that moment on she decided to dedicate herself to music, also guided by her father, who was a guitarist and singer. To continue her musical training, at age 19, she moved to England to study at the Liverpool Institute for Performing Arts, receiving her degree from Paul McCartney upon her graduation.

In 2015, Vismara published her first studio album, titled Casa del viento and composed mostly of songs in English. After posting a few singles, in 2019, she released her second and last album, Selva. That same year she participated in events such as Cosquín Rock, Ciudad Emergente, Fardo Fest and La Bienal, and shared the stage with artists such as Juana Molina, Bandalos Chinos, and El Kuelgue.

With the arrival of the COVID-19 pandemic, Vismara dedicated herself to sharing music videos from her home, and published the single "Sola por la ciudad" in collaboration with the electronic music trio Poncho. In 2020, she contributed her song "Montaña" to the soundtrack of the British series Long Way Up, which appeared in the third episode "Southern Patagonia". A year later, she published last single, "No Se Conquer".

== Death ==
Vismara died in Buenos Aires on 10 August 2022 due to kidney failure, aggravated by cancer with which she was also battling. The Ministry of Culture confirmed the news through their Twitter account. Before her death, the artist had been hospitalized for a month at the Güemes Sanatorium in the Argentine capital. Musicians such as Leo García, Stu Larsen and Emmanuel Horvilleur, with whom Vismara shared musical sessions, expressed their condolences through social media networks.

== Discography ==
=== Studio albums ===
- 2015 - Casa del viento
- 2019 - Selva

=== Singles ===
Year	Title	Notes
2019	"Montaña"	Long Way Up soundtrack
2019	"Selva"	
2019	"Persona"	
2021	"No se deja conquistar"	
