= Karina Fissmann-Renner =

German politician (born 1987)

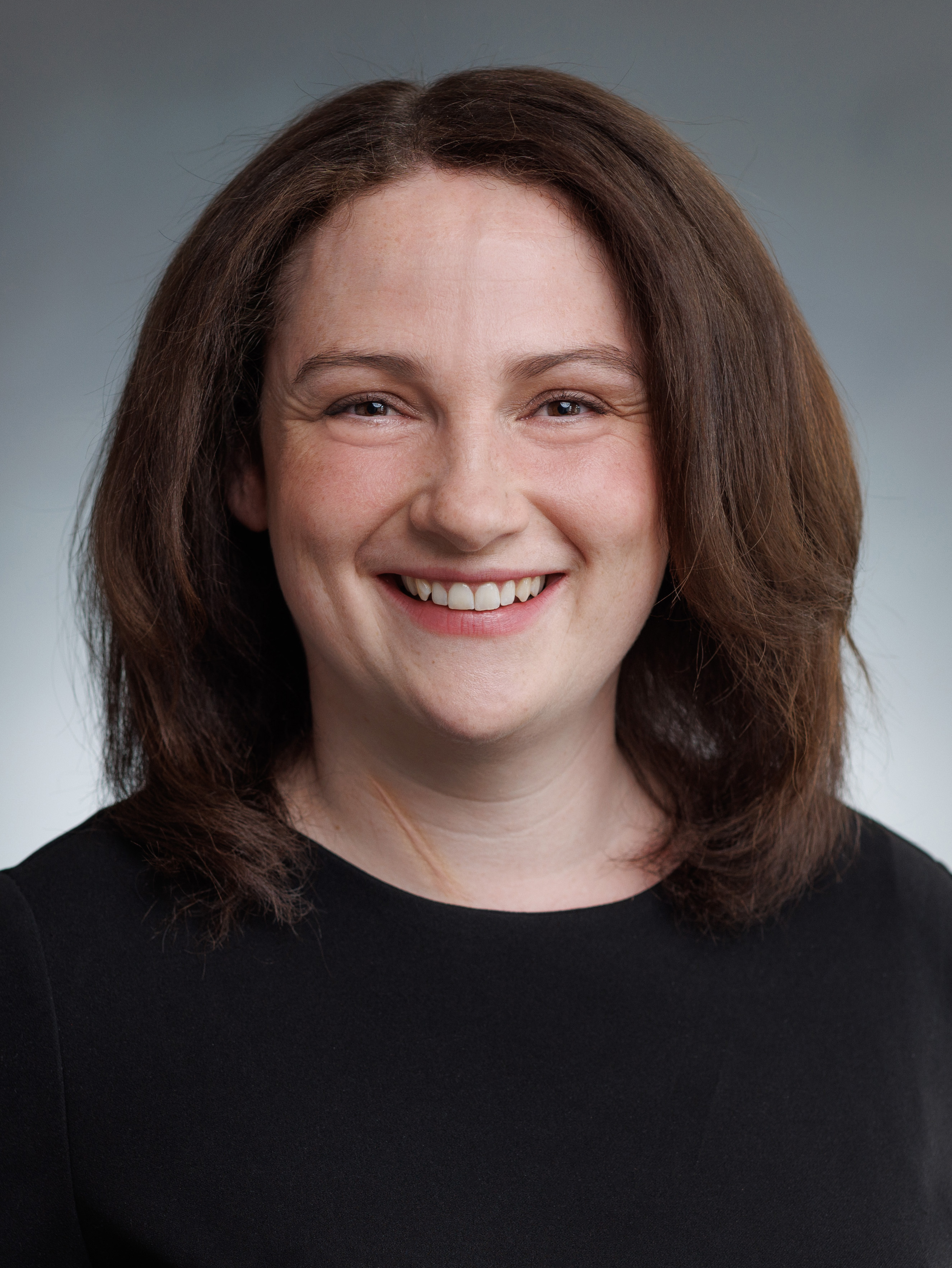
- Fissmann-Renner in 2022

Member of the Landtag of Hesse
- Incumbent
- Assumed office 18 January 2019

Personal details
- Born: 8 January 1987 (age 39) Eschwege
- Party: Social Democratic Party (since 2009)

Karina Fissmann-Renner (née Fissmann; born 8 January 1987 in Eschwege) is a German politician serving as a member of the Landtag of Hesse since 2019. She has served as chairwoman of the Social Democratic Party in the Werra-Meißner-Kreis since 2013.
