= Elda Neyis Mosquera =

- Nicknames: "Karina" "Nelly Ávila Moreno" "Janet Mosquera Rentería" "Rocío Arias"
- Born: 15 August 1963 (age 62)
- Allegiance: Revolutionary Armed Forces of Colombia
- Service years: 1984-2008
- Rank: Commander
- Commands: 47th Front
- Conflicts: Colombian armed conflict (1964–present)

Elda Neyis Mosquera García (born 15 August 1963) (nom de guerre Karina a.k.a. Nelly Ávila Moreno) is the former commander of the 47th Front of FARC-EP, a communist rebel group in Colombia. She surrendered to the Colombian Military on 18 May 2008. She was subsequently tried and found guilty of kidnapping, murder, among others, and sentenced to 33 years in jail, but on 6 March 2009 it was announced that she was to be released from prison to serve as "promoter of peace," and to serve as an example for other rebels to entice them to surrender.

Moreno was a member of FARC for 24 years prior to her surrender. At a news conference in Medellín, Moreno said she surrendered because of increasing Colombian army pressure, the deterioration of rebel forces and her fear she might be killed by her own troops for the $900,000 bounty on her head, in the wake of a previous FARC commander (Iván Ríos) having been murdered by his own bodyguards.
