= Carina Dwarf Spheroidal Galaxy =

Dwarf galaxy in the constellation Carina

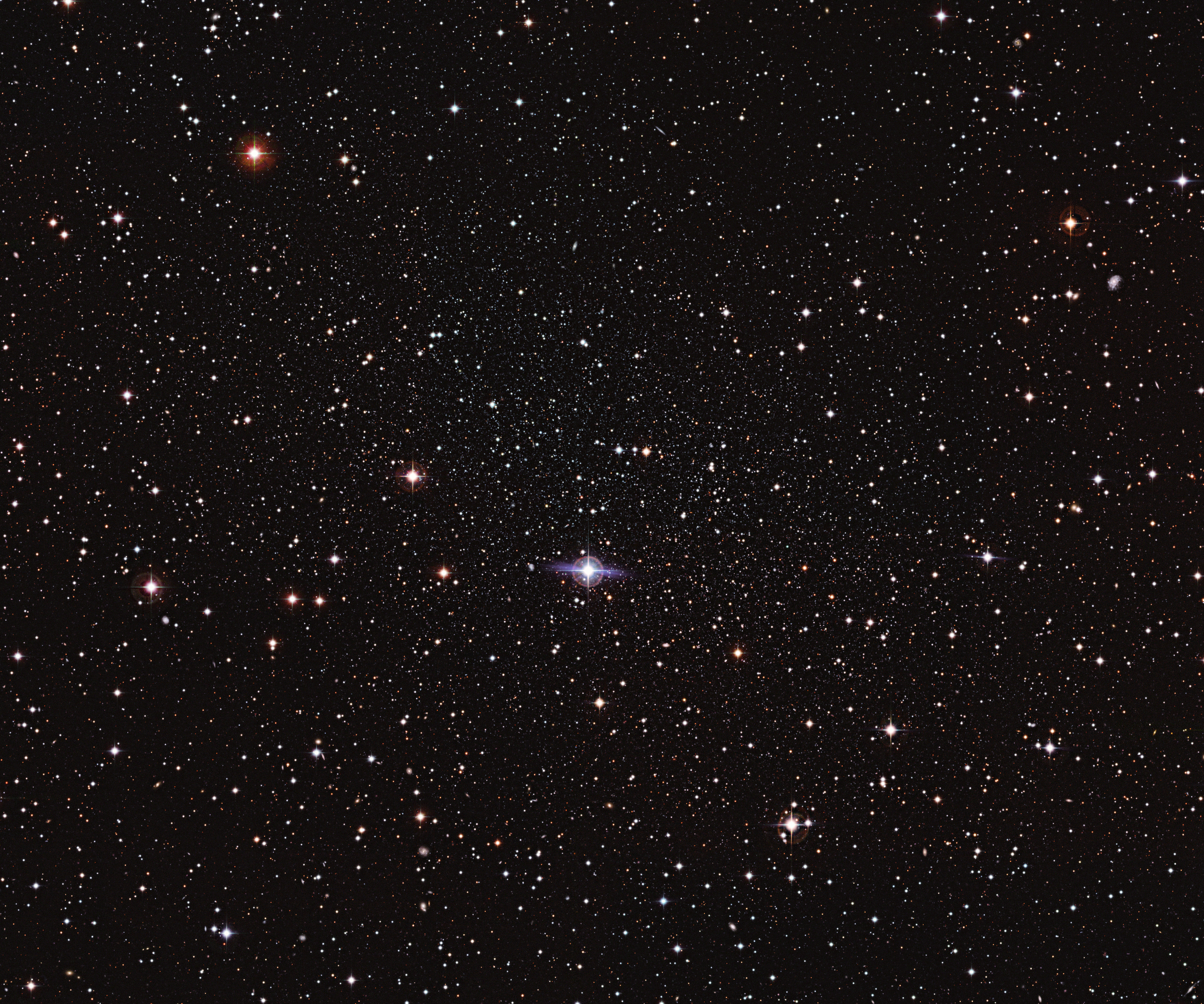
- Carina Dwarf Spheroidal Galaxy image made using observations from the Wide Field Imager on the MPG/ESO 2.2-metre telescope at La Silla, and from the Victor M. Blanco 4-metre telescope at the Cerro Tololo Inter-American Observatory.

Observation data (J2000 epoch)
- Constellation: Carina
- Right ascension: 06^{h} 41^{m} 36.7^{s}
- Declination: −50° 57′ 58″
- Redshift: 230 ± 60 km/s
- Distance: 330 ± 30 kly (100 ± 10 kpc)
- Apparent magnitude (V): 11.3B

Characteristics
- Type: E3
- Mass: 1.51–1.69 million M_{☉}
- Apparent size (V): 23.4′ × 15.5′

Other designations
- Carina Dwarf, PGC 19441, ESO 206-G20

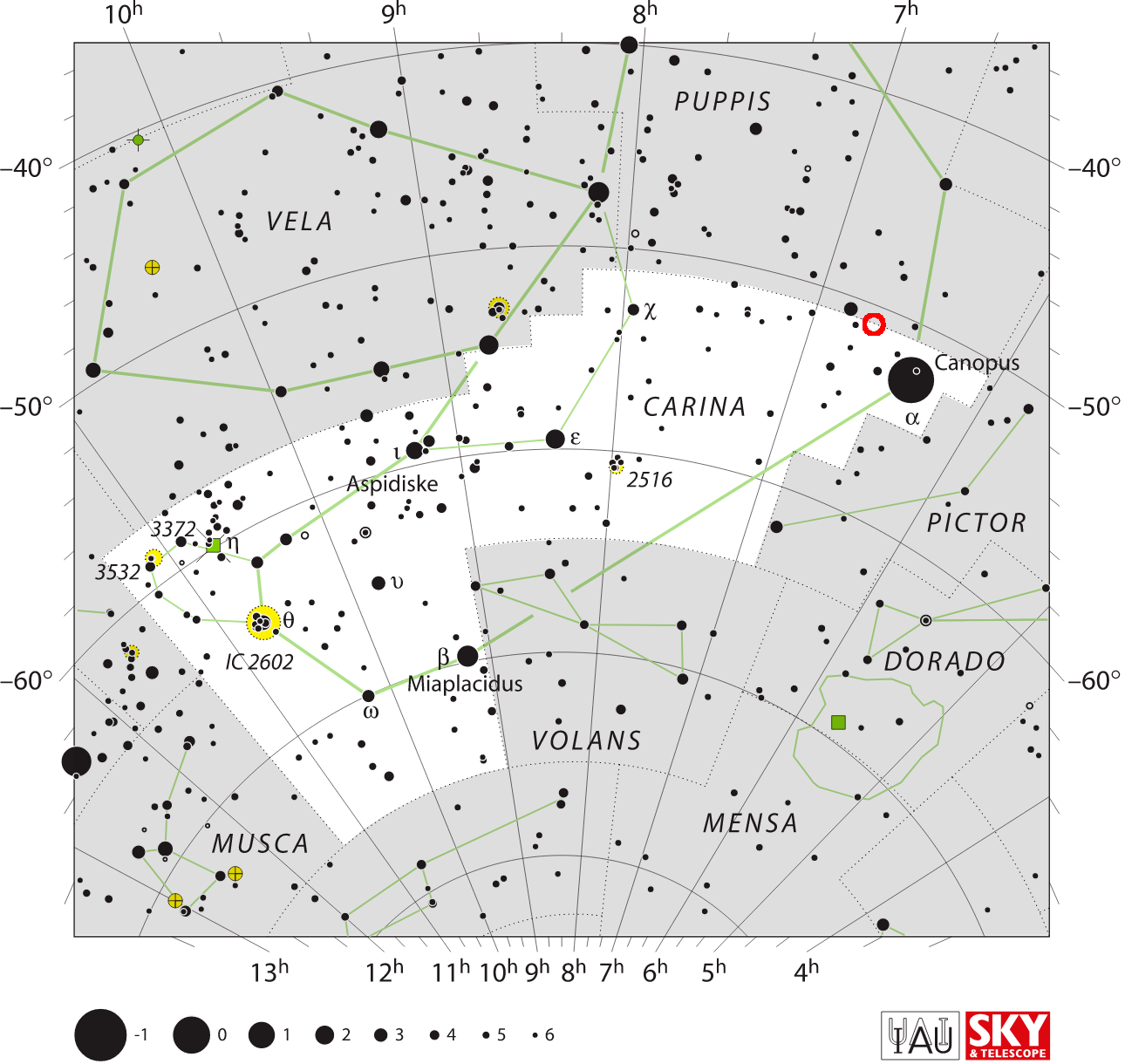
The location of the Carina Dwarf Spheriodal Galaxy (circled in red)

The Carina Dwarf Spheroidal Galaxy is a dwarf galaxy in the constellation Carina. It was discovered in 1977 with the UK Schmidt Telescope by Cannon et al. The Carina Dwarf Spheroidal galaxy is a satellite galaxy of the Milky Way and is receding from it at 230 km/s. The diameter of the galaxy is about 1600 light-years, which is 75 times smaller than the Milky Way. Most of the stars in the galaxy formed 7 billion years ago, although it also experienced bursts of star formation about 13 and 3 billion years ago. It is also being tidally disrupted by the Milky Way galaxy.
