= List of people with surname Carey =

This is a list of people with the surname Carey.

== Sports people ==
- Alan Carey (canoeist) (born 1968), Irish sprint canoeist
- Annabelle Carey (born 1989), New Zealand swimmer
- Ashley Carey (born 1969), Australian field hockey player
- Beth Carey (born 1990), Australian volleyball player
- Betty Lowman Carey (1914–2011), Canadian rower
- Bob Carey (racing driver) (1904–1933), American race car driver
- Chelsea Carey (born 1984), Canadian curler
- Dan Carey (curler) (born 1954), Canadian curler
- Dan Carey (lacrosse) (born 1982), Canadian lacrosse player
- Denis Carey (athlete) (1872–1947), Irish field & track athlete
- Eddie Carey (born 1960), American sprinter
- Jade Carey (born 2000), American gymnast
- Kenneth Carey (1893–1981), American Olympic sailor
- Lance Carey (born 1945), Canadian field hockey player
- Michelle Carey (athlete) (born 1981), Irish athlete
- Ray Carey (born 1986), Irish Gaelic footballer
- Ray Carey (swimmer) (born 1973), American competition swimmer
- Sheila Carey (born 1946), English athlete, maiden name Sheila Janet Taylor
- Walter Carey (1875–1955), South African rugby union player and Bishop of Bloemfontein

=== American Football ===
- Bob Carey (American football) (1930–1988), American NFL football player
- Dana Carey (1903–1976), American football player
- Don Carey (American football official) (born 1947), American NFL official
- Don Carey (cornerback) (born 1987), American football player
- Emerson Carey (1906–1983), American football player
- Joe Carey (American football) (1895–1962), American NFL football player
- Ka'Deem Carey (born 1992), American footballer for Chicago Bears
- Mike Carey (American football) (born 1949), American football official
- Richard Carey (American football) (born 1968), American NFL football player
- Rod Carey (born 1971), American football player and coach
- Tim Carey (born 1975), American football player
- Vernon Carey (born 1981), American footballer for Miami Dolphins

=== Australian Rules football ===
- Bert Carey (1905–1994), Australian rules footballer
- Bill Carey (footballer) (1905–1973), Australian rules footballer
- George Carey (footballer) (born 1943), Australian rules footballer
- Harry Carey (footballer) (1916–1991), Australian rules footballer
- Peter Carey (Australian rules footballer) (born 1954), Australian rules player for Glenelg
- Peter Carey (umpire), Australian rules football umpire
- Stefan Carey (born 1976), Australian rules footballer
- Stephen Carey (born 1959), Australian rules footballer
- Tom Carey (footballer) (1941–2009), Australian rules footballer
- Wayne Carey (born 1971), Australian rules footballer

=== Baseball ===
- Andy Carey (1931–2011), American baseball player
- Dylan Carey (born 2003), American baseball player
- Mary Carey (baseball) (1925–1977), American professional baseball player
- Max Carey (1890–1976), American center fielder in Major League Baseball
- P. J. Carey (1953–2012), American baseball player, manager and official
- Paul Carey (baseball) (born 1968), American baseball player, brother of Jim Carey
- Roger Carey (1865–1895), American baseball player
- Scoops Carey (baseball) (1870–1916), American baseball player
- Tom Carey (second baseman) (1906–1970), American baseball player
- Tom Carey (shortstop) (1846–1906), American baseball player

=== Basketball ===
- Harvey Carey (born 1979), Filipino-American basketball player
- Jamie Carey (born 1981), American basketball player
- Mike Carey (basketball) (born 1958), American basketball coach
- Vernon Carey Jr. (born 2001), American basketball player and son of Vernon

=== Cricket ===
- Alex Carey (born 1991), Australian cricketer
- Christopher Carey (cricketer) (born 1973), English cricketer
- Nicola Carey (born 1993), Australian cricketer
- Paul Carey (cricketer) (1920–2009), English cricketer
- Thomas Carey (cricketer) (1903–1966), American-born Irish cricketer

=== Football ===
- Brian Carey (born 1968), Irish football manager and player, born in Cork
- Chuck Carey (born 1953), American soccer player
- Graham Carey (born 1989), Irish footballer
- Johnny Carey (1919–1995), Irish footballer, born in Dublin, captain of Manchester United and Republic of Ireland
- Louis Carey (born 1977), English footballer
- Peter Carey (English footballer) (born 1933), English footballer
- Shaun Carey (born 1976), English footballer

=== Gaelic sports ===
- Catriona Carey (born 1977), Irish field hockey and camogie player
- Ciarán Carey (born 1970), Irish hurling star, born in County Limerick
- D. J. Carey (born 1970), Irish hurling star, born in County Kilkenny
- Jarlath Carey (1932–2006), Irish Gaelic footballer
- Johnny Carey (Gaelic footballer) (born 1945), Irish Gaelic footballer
- Martin Carey (hurler) (born 1974), Irish hurler
- Sean Carey (Gaelic footballer) (born 1989), Irish sportsman, County Tipperary

=== Ice Hockey ===
- George Carey (ice hockey) (1892–1974), Scottish-Canadian ice hockey right winger
- Greg Carey (ice hockey) (born 1990), Canadian ice hockey player
- Jim Carey (ice hockey) (born 1974), American goaltender, born in Massachusetts
- Matt Carey (born 1992), Canadian ice hockey player
- Paul Carey (ice hockey) (born 1988), American ice hockey player

== Actors ==
- Alycia Debnam-Carey (born 1993), Australian actress
- Anita Carey (1948–2023), British actress born in Halifax, Yorkshire
- Clare Carey (born 1967), Rhodesian born actress
- Denis Carey (actor) (1909–1986), British/Irish actor brother of cinematographer Patrick
- Drew Carey (born 1958), American actor, comedian and game show host
- Emily Carey (born 2003), English actor
- George P. Carey (1852–1909), Australian actor and manager
- Greg Carey (voice actor), Australian-born voice actor
- Harry Carey (actor) (1878–1847), American actor, born in New York; classic 'Cowboy' films
- Harry Carey Jr. (1921–2012), American actor, son of Harry, appeared in 'Westerns'
- Joyce Carey (1898–1993), stage name of English actress born Joyce Lawrence
- Leonard Carey (1887–1977), English actor
- Mary Carey (actress) (born 1980), American pornographic actress
- Lynn Carey (born 1946), American singer and actress
- Macdonald Carey (1913–1994), American actor
- Michele Carey (1942–2018), American television and film actress
- Olive Carey (1896–1988), American film and television actress
- Philip Carey (1925–2009), American film actor, born Eugene Joseph Carey
- Richenda Carey (born 1948), English actress, born in Gloucestershire
- Ron Carey (actor) (1935–2007), American film and television actor
- Timothy Carey (1929–1994), American actor

== Musicians ==
- Bruce Carey (1876–1960), Canadian singer and choral conductor
- Clive Carey (1883–1968), British singer and composer
- Dan Carey (record producer) (born 1969), English record producer
- Danny Carey (born 1961), American drummer of progressive rock band Tool
- Denis Carey (composer), Irish composer and musician, born in Tipperary
- Gina Carey, American filmmaker and singer
- Ian Carey (born 1975), American musician and record producer, born in Maryland
- Jack Carey (musician) (1889–1934), American jazz musician
- Kyle Carey (born 1988), Celtic Americana musical artist
- Mariah Carey (born 1969), American singer–songwriter, record producer and actress
- Mutt Carey (1891–1948), American jazz trumpeter from New Orleans
- Pat Carey (musician) (born 1960), Canadian blues musician
- Percy Carey (born 1970), American hip hop artist and comic book writer
- Rick Carey (singer) (born 1977), Bahamian music producer, singer and musician
- S. Carey, American folk musician, from Wisconsin
- Todd Carey, American musician and singer

== Politicians ==
- Carleton Carey, American politician
- David M. Carey (1889–1963), American politician
- de Vic Carey (born 1940), Guernsey politician
- Donal Carey (1937–2025), Irish politician from County Clare
- Edmond Carey (1883–1943), Irish politician
- Edward Carey (1832–1908), Canadian gold prospector and politician
- Hugh Carey (1919–2011), Irish-American politician, New York governor
- Jon Carey (born 1946), Canadian politician
- Joseph Carey (Canadian politician) (c. 1829–1910), Canadian surveyor and mayor of Vancouver, B. C.
- Peter G. Carey (1828–1897), American politician from Pennsylvania
- Richard Carey (politician) (1929–2013), American politician from Maine
- William Carey (politician) (1887–1928), Australian politician

== Other people ==
- Alan C. Carey (born 1962), American military aviation author and historian
- Alex Carey (writer) (1922–1987), Australian writer and social psychologist
- Alice Ross Carey (1948–2013), American architect
- Alvin P. Carey (1916–1944), American soldier and Medal of Honor winner
- André Isidore Carey (1790–?), French ballet dancer
- Anne Carey, American media producer
- Arthur Carey (1822–1844), English-American Episcopal priest
- Babe Carey, a fictional American soap opera character
- Benedict Carey (born 1960), American journalist and health writer
- Bill Carey (songwriter) (1916–2004), American songwriter
- Bridget Carey (born 1984), American journalist
- Brycchan Carey (born 1967), British academic and writer
- Catherine Carey (c. 1524 – 1569), sister of Henry Carey, 1st Baron Hunsdon
- Catherine A. Carey (born 1945), Clerk of the New York State Assembly 1975–1984
- Charles F. Carey Jr. (1915–1945), American soldier and Medal of Honor winner
- Charles James Carey (1838–1891), Royal Navy officer
- Chase Carey (born 1954), Irish-American businessperson
- Chris Carey (born 1950), British classical scholar
- Constantine Phipps Carey (1835–1906), British army officer
- Diane Carey (born 1954), American fiction writer
- Douglas Carey, Anglican priest
- Duane G. Carey (born 1957), American astronaut, born in Minnesota
- Dwayne Carey-Hill, American animation director
- Edmund Carey (c. 1558 – 1637), English MP
- Edward Carey (novelist) (born 1970), English novelist
- Eleanor Carey (c. 1495 – after 1528), English nun
- Eleanor Carey (actress) (1852–1915), in Australia and America
- Elijah John Carey (1876–1916), New Zealand writer, trade unionist and soldier
- Elizabeth Carey (social activist) (1835–1920), Canadian homemaker and social activist
- Elizabeth Carey, Lady Berkeley (1576–1635), English courtier and arts patron
- Ernestine Gilbreth Carey (1908–2006), American author, born in New York
- Frank Reginald Carey (1912–2004), English World War II fighter ace
- Gabrielle Carey (1959–2023), Australian writer
- Galen Carey, American evangelical leader
- George Carey (born 1935), English Anglican priest, Archbishop of Canterbury
- Sir George Carey (c. 1541 – 1616), English MP for Canterbury
- George Carey, 2nd Baron Hunsdon (1547–1603), English soldier and MP for Hertfordshire and Hampshire
- George Carey (filmmaker) (born 1943), British documentary filmmaker and television journalist
- George Glas Sandeman Carey (1867–1948), British World War I general
- George Jackson Carey (1822–1872), British Army officer
- George R. Carey (1851–1906), American inventor
- George Saville Carey (1743–1807), entertainer and miscellaneous writer
- George W. Carey (1845–1924), American physician
- Henry Carey, 1st Baron Hunsdon (1526–1596), son of William Carey and Mary Boleyn
- Henry Carey, 1st Earl of Dover (c. 1580 – 1666), Royalist Colonel in the English Civil War
- Henry Carey, 2nd Earl of Monmouth (1595–1661), English nobleman
- Henry Carey (writer) (1687–1743), English poet
- Henry Charles Carey (1793–1879), Irish-American economist, son of Mathew Carey
- Henry Ernest Carey (1874–1964), British-born Australian public servant
- Hilary Carey (born 1957), Australian religious historian
- Hugh Carey (soldier) (1840–1886), Irish born Union soldier and winner of Medal of Honor
- Ida Harriet Carey (1891–1982), New Zealand artist and teacher
- Isiah Carey (born 1970), American broadcast journalist
- Jack Carey (dancer) (1927–2013), American swing dancer
- Jacqueline Carey (born 1964), American fantasy novelist
- Jacqueline Carey (novelist born 1954) (born 1954), American novelist
- Jahleel Brenton Carey (1847–1883), from the Guernsey family, soldier in controversial Zulu War incident
- James Carey (1845–1883), Irish terrorist leader and Informer, born in Dublin
- James Carey (Medal of Honor) (1844 or 1847–1913), Irish born U.S. seaman
- James B. Carey (1911–1973, Irish-American labor union leader
- James J. Carey (born 1939), United States Navy admiral
- James L. Carey (1839–1919), American Civil War winner of Medal of Honor
- James W. Carey (1934–2006), American communications theorist
- Janet Lee Carey (born 1954), American college professor and writer
- Jennifer Davis Carey, American government official
- Joe Carey (born 1975), Irish politician from the County Clare family
- John Carey, 2nd Earl of Dover (1608–1677), English peer
- John Carey, 3rd Baron Hunsdon (died 1617), English peer and politician
- John Carey (blessed) (died 1594), Irish Catholic martyr, born in Dublin
- John Carey (Celticist), American scholar specialising in Celtic studies
- John Carey (classical scholar) (1756–1826), Irish writer and teacher, born in Dublin
- John Carey (congressman) (1792–1875), American politician, after whom the town in Ohio is named
- John Carey (courtier) (c. 1491 – 1552), courtier to King Henry VIII
- John Carey (critic) (1934–2025), British writer and academic
- John Carey (martyr) (died 1594), Irish Catholic martyr
- John Carey (Ohio state legislator) (born 1959), Republican legislator
- John Carey (Wisconsin legislator) (1839–?), Democratic legislator
- John L. Carey (died 1852), American newspaper editor
- Archibald Carey Jr. (1908–1981), American lawyer, politician and clergyman
- Joseph M. Carey (1845–1924), American senator and Governor of Wyoming
- Joseph W. Carey (1859–1937), Irish artist
- Josie Carey (1930–2004), stage name of Pennsylvania born Josephine Vicari, children's television presenter
- Kenneth Carey (bishop) (1908–1979), Anglican bishop
- Kevin Carey (born 1970), American education writer and analyst
- Kieran Carey (1933–2007), Irish hurling star, born in County Tipperary
- Leeanne Carey (born 1959), Australian neuroscientist
- Maggie Carey (born c. 1975), American director and screenwriter
- Leslie I. Carey (August 3, 1895 – June 17, 1984), American sound recordist
- Malachy Carey (1956–1992), Irish activist, Provisional IRA and Sinn Féin, born in County Antrim
- Marge Carey (c. 1938 – 2012), English trade unionist
- Mary Carey, Lady Carey (c. 1609 – c. 1680), British author of poems and meditations
- Mary Virginia Carey (1925–1994), American writer
- Mary Carey (c. 1499/1500–1543), surname before marriage was Mary Boleyn. Sister of Anne Boleyn
- Mathew Carey (1760–1839), Irish nationalist and Philadelphia publisher, born in Dublin
- Maude Carey (1888–1950), Falklands Islands postmaster
- Michael Carey (priest) (1913–1985), from the Guernsey, Channel Island family, Anglican clergyman
- Michael Carey (United States Air Force officer) (born 1960), American officer
- Mike Carey (politician) (born 1971), American politician from Ohio
- Mike Carey (writer) (born 1959), Liverpool born comic book writer
- Nessa Carey, English epigenetics author
- Nuala Carey (born 1977), Irish radio weather presenter
- Pat Carey (born 1947), Irish politician, born in County Kerry
- Patrick Carey (cinematographer) (1916–1996), British/Irish film maker
- Paul Carey (broadcaster) (1928–2016), American radio broadcaster and sports announcer
- Paul Carey (politician) (1962–2001), American politician, son of Hugh Carey
- Pelham Carey, English courtier
- Peter Carey (historian) (born 1948), British historian
- Peter Carey (novelist) (born 1943), Australian prize-winning novelist
- Philip J. Carey (1918–1996), American politician and judge
- Rea Carey (born 1966), American LGBT rights activist
- Richard Adams Carey (born 1951), American writer
- Richard E. Carey (1928–2025), American Marine Corps Lieutenant General
- Richelle Carey (born 1976), American TV news reporter
- Rick Carey (born 1963), American competition swimmer
- Robert Carey, 1st Earl of Monmouth (c. 1560 – 1639), son of 1st Baron Hunsdon,
- Robert Carey (British Army officer) (1821–1883), from the Guernsey, Channel Islands family
- Robert Carey (died 1587) (c. 1515 – 1587), English MP
- Robert Carey (gangster) (1894–1932), American criminal
- Robert D. Carey (1878–1937), American politician
- Robert T. Carey, American Whig legislator from Wisconsin
- Ron Carey (labor leader) (1936–2008), American labor organiser
- Ron Carey (Minnesota politician), American politician
- Rosa Nouchette Carey (1840–1909), English children's author, born in London's East End
- Sabine Carey (born 1974), German political scientist
- Sam Carey, American Old West outlaw
- Samuel Pearce Carey (1862–1953) English Baptist minister in Melbourne, Australia
- Samuel Warren Carey (1911–2002), Australian geologist
- Sarah Carey, Irish columnist and broadcaster
- Sas Carey (born 1945), American film director and author
- Seamus Carey, American philosopher and academic
- Susan Carey (born 1942), American psychologist
- Tanith Carey, British journalist
- Thomas Carey (Australian politician) (1832 or 1833–1884), Irish emigrant and surveyor
- Thomas Carey (baritone) (1931–2002), American opera singer
- Thomas Carey (English politician) (died 1634), English MP, son of Robert Carey, 1st Earl of Monmouth
- Tony Carey (born 1953), American composer, singer/songwriter
- Victor Carey (1871–1957), from the Guernsey family, Bailiff of Guernsey during WWII
- William Carey (Bailiff of Guernsey) (1853–1915), Bailiff of Guernsey
- William Carey (bishop) (1769–1846), English churchman
- William Carey (courtier) (c. 1500 – 1528), from West Country family, married to Mary Boleyn
- William Carey (missionary) (1761–1834), English Baptist missionary and botanist
- William D. Carey (1916–1998), American publisher
- William P. Carey (1930–2012), American philanthropist and businessman, born in Maryland
- William Paulet Carey (1759–1839), Irish art critic and publicist, born in Dublin
- William R. Carey (1806–1836), Virginian Captain, killed at the Battle of the Alamo

== See also ==
- Cary (surname), a similar name
- List of people with surname Carrey, a similar name
- Alycia Debnam-Carey
