= George Carey (disambiguation) =

George Carey (born 1935) is a former archbishop of Canterbury.

George Carey may also refer to:

- Sir George Carey (c. 1541 – 1616) (or Cary), Lord Deputy of Ireland
- George Carey, 2nd Baron Hunsdon (1547–1603), English soldier and Member of Parliament for Hertfordshire and Hampshire
- George Carew, 1st Earl of Totnes (1555–1629), also known as George Carey
- George Saville Carey (1743–1807), entertainer and miscellaneous writer
- (George) Carey Foster (1835–1919), English chemist and physicist
- George R. Carey (fl. 1878), American inventor
- George Carey (ice hockey) (1892–1974), Scottish-Canadian ice hockey right winger
- George Carey (filmmaker) (born 1943), British documentary filmmaker and television journalist
- George Jackson Carey (1822–1872), British Army officer
- George W. Carey (1845–1924), American physician
- George Carey (footballer) (born 1943), Australian rules footballer
- George P. Carey, Australian actor and manager

== See also ==
- George Cary (disambiguation)
- George Carew (disambiguation)
