= Carey (surname) =

Family name

Carey, Cary or Carrey is a surname that has four distinct geographical origins, in order of popularity: Ireland, the English West Country, Wales and France.

The surname arises from nine recorded distinct patronymics in Ireland, and is numerous and widespread; the many original forms have been listed by the National Folklore Collection of Ireland in 2015, increasing the number of variants quoted by the Registrar General of Ireland in 1890. Some forms contain the Old Irish adjective 'ciar'- 'black/dark', of which Ó Ciardha (County Kildare, County Westmeath & 'many parts of the south of Ireland'), Ó Ciaráin (County Cork), Ó Céirín, (County Kerry, County Clare, County Mayo), Ó Cearáin (County Mayo), Mac Giolla Céire (County Cork, County Kilkenny), Ó Ciarmhacháin (County Cork) and Ó Ciarmhaic in some parts of Munster; also from the County Galway and County Meath surname Mac Fhiachra, through its early phonetic anglicisations of Keighry, Kehery & c.; and from Ó Carráin/Ó Corráin (County Tipperary), with the Irish root 'carra/corra'- 'spear'; and MacFhearadhaigh (MacCarry/MacCary), root 'fear'-'man', of County Antrim.

It may derive from the English West Country, viz. Castle Cary on the River Cary in Somerset and/or Carey Barton on the River Carey in Devon, containing either the Pre-Celtic element 'kar'- 'stony/hard' (Watts, 2004), or the Celtic language element 'car' 'dear/pleasant' (Hanks, 2003).

Carew, Pembrokeshire, from Welsh language 'Caeriw'- with the Celtic root 'caer'- 'fort', or from places in Cornwall, perhaps with the cognate Cornish element 'ker', or the Pre-Celtic element 'car'- 'stony/stones' as in Carey Tor, Bodmin Moor.

Carey occurs as a variant of (de) Carrey in archives in Normandy, Burgundy, Franche-Comté etc., in France from habitational names, possibly with the Pre-Celtic element 'car'-'stony/stones'. The Norman name is probably the origin of the surname in Guernsey, Channel Islands.

== Worldwide distribution ==
The Irish provenance of Carey, through emigration, is not only particularly evident in the US and Australia, but also in Great Britain. The first two entries under 'Carey' in the 'Dictionary of American Family Names' (Oxford, 2003) gives Irish origins; the New York Passengers List (1820–1957) show 2,058 Carey immigrants from Ireland compared with 345 from England. In 2010, British telephone directories showed highest numbers of Careys in areas of Irish immigration: Greater London (320), Greater Manchester & Lancashire (272), Kent (163), West Yorkshire (145) and West Midlands (145).

== Evolution in Ireland ==
The Southern Uí Néill sept of Ó Ciardha was dispersed by the end of the 12th century (Woulfe, MacLysaght, et al. op. cit.) due to the incursions of the Cambro-Norman invaders. Their territory at Carbury was later settled by the De Berminghams, who built the castle on top of the ancient hill settlement.

This ua Ciardha sept are recorded early, e.g. 'ua Ciardai, ri Cairpri', i.e. O Carey, king of Carbury, in AD 954, Annals of Ulster, 'MaelRuaining hua Ciardha, rí Cairpri', 993, Annals of Tigernach.

Ó Dubhagáin (died 1372) wrote of 'Ó Ciardha over Cairbre of poets, of the tribes of Nine-hostaged Niall'. The Genealogies of Dubhaltach Mac Fhirbhisigh (c 1400) mentions them: 'O Ciarda obtained heavy profit of the land of Cairbre'. They seem to re-appear in 17th-century records for County Meath, County Westmeath and County Offaly. O' Donovan writes in his notes to the above 'Topographical poems of Ó Dubhagáin and Ó hUidhrín', (1862): 'O Ciardha is now anglicised Keary and Carey, and the name is common, but to be found only among the lower orders' (note 379), and 'Ó Ciardha, now anglicised Keary and Carey, a rather numerous name in the counties of Meath and Kildare' (note 447).

However, this epithet type surname from 'ciar'-'dark/black' is common and widespread in Ireland and has arisen independently in other parts of the country, notably in Cos Cork, Kerry and Mayo, including diminutive forms such as Ó Ciaráin, Ó Céirín Ó Ciarmhacháin and Ó Cearáin. For example, in the Annals of Ulster in 1224 we find 'Mathgamain mac Ceithernaigh h-Ui Ceirín, rí Ciaraidhe Lacha na Nairne, mortuus est'. Early examples are found in those counties; and these other Carey families would not belong to the well known midland Uí Néill sept of Ó Ciardha. For example, it has been claimed that the East Cork family anciently using the form Ó Ciaráin would account for bearers of the name Carey with origins in East Cork and the adjacent parts of Waterford (Woulfe op. cit., MacLysaght op. cit.), whereas the West Cork Careys may well have arisen separately, but having the same etymological source in the adjective/attribute 'ciar', which occurs anciently as 'cer'.

== From the Irish records ==
Some examples from the Fiants (mostly in receipt of 'pardons' for 'rebellion'): Dermot M'Donoghe O' Cary, 'gent, lord and captain' of Duhallow, North West Co Cork, 1561; Maurice Kerry, County Wexford, 1561; Patrick O' Kearine, East Cork, 1570; James Cary, County Meath, 1582; O' Kearane, County Cork, 1599; Margery Ny Kerrye, County Cork, 1600; William O'Carie of County Longford, 1602; Donnell O' Kearyne, South East Cork, 1602; O' Keryne, County Clare, several 1600s. A number of bearers occur in the '1641 Depositions', notably in Co Mayo, e.g. Cormac Cary and Co Westmeath, e.g. Laughlin Ó Cary. Also in the Calendar of State Papers e.g. John Kearie & Katherin Kery, County Limerick, 1653, are 'transported'.

In King James 11's Irish Army, 1688–90 (v. Williamite War in Ireland) is Thomas Carey (alias Keary in French records), Ensign, Barrett's Regiment, Co Cork. There is also listed in French records an Ensign Kery in Creagh's Regiment.

Regarding the above forms, Gaelic names would have been 1) simplified over time in local speech, and 2) spelt phonetically by English 17th-century officials, who would also have assimilated them to British models where available; there are common Irish names whose anglicised forms coincide with rarer British names, e.g. Brady, (Mac Brádaigh), Boyle (Ó Baoighill), Conway (Mac Connmhaigh, Mac Conmidhe & c.), Cullen (Ó Cuilinn & c).

By the mid-17th century, records taken by the Cromwellian official Sir William Petty, known as the1659 Census, shows 'Cary' as a 'Principal Irish Name' in County Meath and County Offaly, 'McCarey/McCarrey' as a Principal Irish Name in County Westmeath and 'Kegry' also in the same county. Three 'tituladoes', or owners of land, of the name are recorded in the 1659 Census for Co Cork: one native Irish, William Cary in Kilbrittain, West Cork, head of an extensive 'family' of 23; one of possibly Norman origin, Theophilus Cary (also 'Carew' in the 'Census') sheriff of Cork, just west of Cork city in modern Ballincollig in Barretts Barony; and one English, Capt. Peter Cary, (also 'Carew' in the 'Census') a Cromwellian soldier, purchaser of a considerable estate in North East Cork. This last family, of 'Careysville' near Fermoy, claimed to be of Devonshire origin, and died out in the male line in the late 19th century.

A number of native forms appears in the Hearth Money Rolls for Co Tipperary in 1664/5/7. These native householders would have been the progenitors of the numerous Carey families recorded in Tipperary in the 1850s (Griffith's 'Primary Valuation'). Examples in 1664 in South Tipperary: Patrick McCarda, Michael Carrig, Thomas Carry, John Cary, Wm Cary, Connor Cary, William Cary, Graine Carhe, John McCarragh, Morrish Carragh, Daniell Kyary, David Keary etc.; and in North Tipperary: Donnogh O' Chara, Derby Carragh, Rory McCarry, Matthew Carry, Unny Carrigh, Unny Carey and so forth. In the 1661 Poll Money Book for Clonmel, is Teige Cary, a 'gunstocker'.

In the 1659 'Census' (O) Carrane, Carran etc. occurs throughout Tipperary in large numbers, e.g. in Iffa and Offa Barony 22 householders, in Middlethird 34. Many examples occur on the Hearth Money Rolls also. Examples: Teige O' Carrane, Clanwilliam, Edmond Carrane, Middlethird etc. This Gaelic surname, Ó Carráin/Ó Corráin, has been Anglicised as Carew as well as Carey, from the end of the 16th century.

The Religious Census of 1766 for Co Tipperary has many entries for Car(e)y, all of whom are native 'Papists': e.g. John & Cornelius Cary, Clonoulty; Thomas Keary, Kilfeacle; Daniel Keary, Killea; Laughlin Carey and four other Careys, Cahir; John Carey/Keary, Lattin; Darby plus three other Carys, Soloheadmore etc.; Edm Keary, Templenoe etc. There are several Carews, also 'Papists', in Cloneen, Toom and Fethard.

Throughout this period and the following centuries, as noted by the Registrar General, R. E. Matheson in his report of 1901, surnames in Ireland had become altered in form by regional dialects and pronunciation, the anomalies of anglicisation and the effects of illiteracy, so as to occur in a bewildering variety of forms, even within the same families. Alongside this is the process of simplification already mentioned, reinforced by the mutation of the Irish form into English letters, e.g. the 'y' ending in English replacing 'aigh', 'aidh', 'dha' and even 'n' endings, 'áin, ín' etc. cf. 'Tipperary' and Irish original 'Tiobrad Árann'.

== Mid 19th century Irish figures ==
By the time of the 'Primary Valuation (1847–64)' of Richard Griffith, County Tipperary had the most Carey households (239) followed by County Cork (177), County Limerick (108), County Dublin (94) and County Mayo (81), out of a total of Carey households in Ireland of 1,308. The Cary spelling occurs mostly in Westmeath (11) and Donegal (11), with a total of 33. For Keary: most in Tipperary (11), Dublin (8) and Westmeath (7) with a total of 64. All these forms are variants, with Carey becoming the most frequent mid to late 1800s.

A conservative approximate total number of bearers in the 1850s may be got by multiplying the total households by an average per household of 4 (a minimal figure given the size of families then), giving 5, 364 (this figure not including other variants like Keary). Birth figures for the year 1890, from the Registrar General's 'Special Report...' (1894) were 118, of which 59 were in Munster, 36 Leinster, 13 Connacht and 10 Ulster. Principal counties were Cork, Dublin, Tipperary, Mayo & Kerry. Similarly, by multiplying the total of 118 by the average birthrate for 1890 which is 1 in 44.8, gives 5, 286. Many bearers of the name would have been part of the intense emigration from Ireland in the years following the Great Famine (Ireland) (1845–52).

== Evolution in England's West Country ==
Cary is a Somerset surname possibly from one of the places therein such as Castle Cary or Lytes Cary, Pre-Celtic or Celtic language Kari/Cari, as the river. It occurs early, e.g. in the Somerset 'Feet of Fines': Philip de Kary (1203), Gunilda de Kary (1235), Peter de Cary (1280). The spelling Cary is still frequent in Somerset, as a look at telephone directories and electoral registers shows.

Car(e)ys are recorded in the Mormon International Genealogical Index in Somerset: Walter Carye, Ansford, 1555, Richard Cary, Pilton, 1559, Jone Carye, Evercreech, 1576.

Car(e)y is also a Devonshire name, possibly from the place in Devon on the River Carey, just east of Launceston, recorded as 'Kari' (Pre-Celtic or Celtic language) in the Domesday Book (1086). An early bearer of the name, Sanson de Cari, held lands in Buckland in Devon in 1197 (Devon Feet of Fines, No. 4). The Mormon I.G.I has entries for Car(e)y in Devon (records begin in 1538): e.g. Henry Cary, Knowstone, 1553, William Carey, Woodbury, 1560, Nicholas Cary, Honiton, 1571.

The Devonshire Cary family of Cockington and the Manor of Clovelly recorded their eponymous ancestor in the 1564 'Visitation of Devon' as 'John Cary of Cary'.

Car(e)y is also a surname in Cornwall, for which there are several possible derivations, which must also apply to the adjacent county of Devon : 1) one of several places in Cornwall with the Brythonic element 'car/caer'-'fort/enclosure', such as Kerrow, Cairo (there exist many antique site 'Caer' type names as in 'Caer Kief') – a source also of the Carew surname; 2) a local topographical name from root Pre-Celtic 'kar' viz. 'stone/stony' as in Carey Tor in Bodmin Moor; 3) Car(e)y (river) of St. Giles-in-the-Heath, West Devon; 4) Carew of Pembrokeshire (also from root 'caer'-'fort') the Cambro-Norman surname.

The Mormon I.G.I. for Cornwall records several Carey births; some early ones: John Cari, St Just, 1550, Ede Cary, St Just, 1556, Edvardus Careye, St. Ewe, 1605, Cary is also found in records in Brittany (e.g. Ille-et-Vilaine).

However, an alternative origin for some families of West Country Car(e)y may be, as with the Careys of Guernsey in the Channel Islands, Norman French or Breton. As early as 1150–61 one Geoffrey de Kari is mentioned in the Norman rolls held in Calvados, as giving land to the monks near Bruton, Somerset; the other donors mentioned have Norman names: de Cantelu, de Carevilla & c.

As early as the 1841 Census Carey is found in significant numbers in Somerset (213 + 302 Cary), but also in South East England in Kent (210 + 11 Cary) and Sussex (194 + 13 Cary) Carr(e)y also occurs as a variant in all three counties.

== Irish immigration into Britain ==
In respect of the arrival of Irish immigrant Careys, the Mormon International Genealogical Index record of the parish registers of Lincolnshire reveals many Irish surnames from the late 16th and early 17th centuries. There are numerous entries for Car(e)y 1611, Connel 1562, Conoly 1607, Daly 1595, Kell(e)y 1566, Murphy 1627, O'Neale 1612, etc. (more examples below). Most of the entries occur in the fenland parishes of South Lincs. Early bearers have Christian names such as Mary, Joseph, Bridget, and later Abigail, Rebeccah, Samuel... Some early Careys: Francis Carye of Stainfield, 1601, Joanis and Mariae Cary of Hatton, 1673, Bridget and Thomas Carey of Legbourne 1692. However, most of the 42 Carey and 56 Cary entries in nearby Norfolk on the 1841 Census appear to be indigenous, with forenames such as Aron, Jemima, Phoebe, Priscilla, Rhoda, Samuel and Sarah (v. also note on Romani Car(e)y families in Kent and Sussex, above).

This picture becomes clear when one looks at the overall distribution in Britain: one can see an established pattern of Irish immigration, particularly post 1850s; for example, 50 out of 75 Patrick Careys listed in England in the 1871 Census of England were born in Ireland. The 1871 and 1881 Censuses of England & Wales shows 790 and 800 Careys, respectively, of Irish birth as living in England and Wales. They appear mainly in London/Middlesex, Lancashire, Yorkshire, Glamorgan, Monmouth, Kent, Northumberland, Cheshire, Oxfordshire, Essex etc.

The 1891 Census of England shows the highest numbers of Careys in Lancashire & Yorkshire (mainly West Yorks), with 746 and 275 respectively, followed by London (978), then Kent/Surrey/Sussex (866 together), and only then the South West with Somerset (347), Devon (98) and Cornwall (9). In a nutshell, in 1891 Lancashire, a major centre of Irish immigration in the 19th century, had more than twice the number of Careys than Somerset, the main provenance of English Car(e)y (v. supra 1841 census). The Lancashire figures are mainly in Manchester and Liverpool.

The 1891 Census of Scotland lists the top two areas for Careys as Lanarkshire (mainly the Glasgow area, 153) and Angus (mainly Dundee, 78), both areas of high Irish immigration; the 1891 Census for Wales shows 221, almost all in South Wales (Glamorgan, Monmouth etc.) also areas of high Irish immigration

In modern times there are large numbers of Careys in the (former) industrial areas of the Midlands and the North of England, as well, of course, as the London area. There are also numerous Careys in the Glasgow and Cardiff areas; in fact, outside London, Glasgow had the most bearers in any city telephone directory in Britain in 2001/2002.

== Evolution in France ==
Carey appears in French archives: Claude Carey, b. Saône et Loire, Bourgogne, 1590; Laurens Carey, Paris, 1595; Jehan Carey, Cher, Centre France, c. 1600; Eglantine Carey, 1600, Côte d'Or, Bourgogne; Mathieu Carey, Calvados, Normandie, 1625. Simon Carey, Rouen-St Denis, Normandie, 1650.

It is clear that most instances of the above are variants of (de) Carrey, for example the Carrey family of Claville, Eure, Normandy for which Carey appears as a variant during the 17th century. On the register at Houetteville in Eure is a 'Barbe Carré', mother in April 1671, and recorded as 'Barbe Carey' when she died in November of that year. There is a registration of a 'Carey de Cortiamble' family tree in 1729.

The (de) Carreys of Bellemare, near Rouen in Seine-Maritime, Normandy are said in de Saint-Allais' Nobiliare Universel de France, Tome 1, (1814) to be originally an ancient Irish family: 'famille ancienne, d'originaire d'Irlande', (page 37). The Irish origin of the Bellemare Carreys is certainly mythical.

'Carey' in present-day France has approximately 1,674 bearers, according to one source, and is found mostly, not counting the Paris area, in Charente-Maritime, Bouches-du-Rhône and Rhône, and 'Cary', with 911 bearers, is most frequent in Nord-Pas-de-Calais, Bouches-du-Rhône and Finistère.'Carrey', with 1,423 bearers, is found mostly in Landes, Seine-Maritime and Essonne.

Guernsey, Channel Islands

The Guernsey Carey name likely evolved from one of the de Carrey lines of mainland Normandy. The Manoir de Carrey near Lisieux, Calvados, Normandy, has been cited by members of the Guernsey Carey family as their own origin. (v. supra).

Guernsey records note:

In 1288, Johan Caree as an inhabitant of the Guernsey parish of St Martin's performing the role of ' Coustomier ' or Law Practitioner; in 1309, a landowner in St Martins by the name of Philip Caree; in 1331, noted in the Assize Roll, Johannes Karee as an official of the Ecclesiastical Court; in 1370, Jean Careye shown as a tenant within the Roll of Tenants of the Abbey and Priory of St Martins.

The College of Arms issued a confirmation of Arms on 11 November 1915. Although the arms are almost identical to those of Cary of Devon, there is no known connection between the two.

In the 1871 Census, ten Careys are registered as born in Guernsey and three in Jersey. There were also three Irish-born Careys in Jersey and two in Guernsey, at the same census; and the 1881 Census has eight Irish-born Careys resident in Guernsey.

== Migration to North America ==
In the 21st century, by far the largest population of Careys is found in the US, with 54,924 individuals recorded in 2010. Many American Careys are able to trace their family origins back to Ireland via one of the waves of emigration from there, especially from the time of the Great Famine of 1845–1852. The large numbers of Irish Careys, well attested in the shipping registers, for the most part landing in New York and spreading through the northern states and later westwards, followed the demographics of Irish immigration. Of earlier inception, however, is Mathew Carey (1760–1839), the Irish nationalist who fled his native Dublin to settle in Philadelphia, where he founded a publishing house. More typical is former Governor of New York, Hugh Carey (1919–2011) a leading Irish-American politician descended from a 19th-century County Mayo emigrant. It is possible that the former would be of Ó Ciardha stock, whilst the latter is most probably an Ó Cearáin through his ancestor 'Michael Kirrane'. Other Carys are of English, particularly West Country extraction, such as the Cary family of Virginia, descended from Miles Cary of Bristol (1623–1667)

== See also ==
- List of people with surname Carey
