= Alan Carey =

Alan Carey may refer to:

- Alan Carey (canoeist) (born 1968), Irish sprint canoeist
- Alan Carey (mathematician); see Twisted K-theory
- Alan C. Carey (born 1962), American military aviation author and historian
