= DWAS =

DWAS is an acronym that may refer to:

- Doctor Who Appreciation Society
- Jack and Jill (dance) or Dance With A Stranger, a format of competition in partner dancing
- DreamWorks Animation Studios
- Die With A Smile
