= Governor Carey =

Governor Carey may refer to:

- Hugh Carey (1919–2011), 51st Governor of New York
- Joseph M. Carey (1845–1924), 8th Governor of Wyoming
- Robert D. Carey (1878–1937), 11th Governor of Wyoming

== See also ==
- List of people with surname Carey
