= Cathy Stinear =

New Zealand neuroscience professor

- Born: 20. century

Academic background
- Education: University of Auckland
- Thesis: Motor cortex inhibition in focal hand dystonia (2003)

Cathy Maree Stinear is a New Zealand clinical neuroscientist, and is a full professor at the University of Auckland, specialising in stroke rehabilitation and techniques for prediction of stroke recovery. She was appointed Chair of the Neurological Foundation of New Zealand in 2021, and is the first woman to chair the organisation.

== Academic career ==
Stinear did not want to go to university, and left school during her final year. She then trained as a pilot, and worked as a flying instructor. At age 23 Stinear began studying at the New Zealand College of Chiropractic and entered private practice upon graduation with a BSc in Chiropractic. She simultaneously completed a BSc in Physiology at the University of Auckland. She then pursued her interests in neuroscience by enrolling in a MSc at the University of Auckland. Stinear followed this with a PhD titled Motor cortex inhibition in focal hand dystonia also at Auckland. Stinear then joined the faculty of the University of Auckland, rising to full professor in 2019. Stinear is Director of the Clinical Neuroscience Laboratory in the Department of Medicine, and conducts clinical research within the Auckland District Health Board’s Stroke Unit. She is also Pro-Vice Chancellor Equity at the university. Stinear chaired the Neurological Foundation's science advisory committee for four years, and was appointed Chair of their Council in 2021, following on from Dr Barry Snow. She is the first woman to chair the foundation.

Stinear's postdoctoral research focused on stroke rehabilitation, and she has continued to work in this area, using neurophysiological and neuromodulation techniques to work directly with patients, and to make individualised predictions for stroke recovery.

== Selected works ==
- Stinear, Cathy Maree; Barber, Alan; Peter R Smale; James P. Coxon; Fleming, Melanie; Byblow, Winston (2007). "Functional potential in chronic stroke patients depends on corticospinal tract integrity". Brain. 130 (Pt 1): 170–180. doi:10.1093/brain/awl333. PMID 17148468. Wikidata Q48346969.
- Adam R Aron; Durston, Sarah; Dawn M. Eagle; Logan, Gordon; Stinear, Cathy Maree; Veit Stuphorn (2007). "Converging evidence for a fronto-basal-ganglia network for inhibitory control of action and cognition". The Journal of Neuroscience. 27 (44): 11860–11864. doi:10.1523/jneurosci.3644-07.2007. PMC 6673355. PMID 17978025. Wikidata Q36989252.
- Stinear, Cathy Maree; Barber, Alan; Matthew Petoe; Samir Anwar; Byblow, Winston (2012). "The PREP algorithm predicts potential for upper limb recovery after stroke". Brain. 135 (Pt 8): 2527–2535. doi:10.1093/brain/aws146. PMID 22689909. Wikidata Q46410643.
- Stinear, Cathy Maree; Catherine E Lang; Steven Zeiler; Winston D Byblow (2020). "Advances and challenges in stroke rehabilitation". The Lancet Neurology. 19 (4): 348–360. doi:10.1016/s1474-4422(19)30415-6. PMID 32004440. Wikidata Q89467760.
- Stinear, Cathy Maree; Byblow, Winston; Maarten Steyvers; Oron Levin; Swinnen, Stephan (2005). "Kinesthetic, but not visual, motor imagery modulates corticomotor excitability". Experimental Brain Research. 168 (1–2): 157–164. doi:10.1007/s00221-005-0078-y. PMID 16078024. Wikidata Q46632671.
- Stinear, Cathy Maree (2010). "Prediction of recovery of motor function after stroke". The Lancet Neurology. 9 (12): 1228–1232. doi:10.1016/s1474-4422(10)70247-7. PMID 21035399. Wikidata Q33733906.
- Lara A Boyd; Hayward, Kathryn; Ward, Nick; Stinear, Cathy Maree; Charlotte Rosso; Fisher, Rebecca; Alexandre R Carter; Leff, Alexander; David A Copland; Carey, Leeanne; Leonardo G Cohen; D Michele Basso; Jane M Maguire; Steven C Cramer (2017). "Biomarkers of stroke recovery: Consensus-based core recommendations from the Stroke Recovery and Rehabilitation Roundtable". International Journal of Stroke. 12 (5): 480–493. doi:10.1177/1747493017714176. PMC 6791523. PMID 28697711. Wikidata Q38659060.
