= Dance with a Stranger (disambiguation) =

Dance with a Stranger may refer to one of the following:

- Dance with a Stranger, a 1985 film
- Jack and Jill (dance), a dance competition format
- Dance with a Stranger (band), a Norwegian rock band
