= Tanith =

Tanith may refer to:

== Mythology ==
- Tanith, alternative spelling of Tanit, an ancient Carthaginian lunar goddess of the Punic pantheon

== People ==
- Tanith (DJ) (born 1962), stage name of Thomas Andrezak, German DJ and producer of electronic dance music
- Tanith Belbin (born 1984), Canadian/American figure skater
- Tanith Carey (born 1967), British author and journalist
- Tanith Lee (1947–2015), British author
- Tanith Maxwell (born 1976), South African runner
- Tanit Phoenix (born 1984), South African fashion model and actress

== Fictional characters ==
- Tanith (Stargate), a male Goa'uld from Stargate SG-1
- Tanith Carlisle, a leading character in The Devil Rides Out by Dennis Wheatley
- Tanith, a secondary character in The World of Lone Wolf gamebook series
- Tanith Low, a character in the Skulduggery Pleasant series of novels by Derek Landy
- Tanith, the deputy commander of Begnion's Holy Guard from Fire Emblem: Path of Radiance and Fire Emblem: Radiant Dawn
- Tanith, head of the Volcano Manor in Elden Ring

== Fictional locations ==
- Tanith (CoDominium), a planet in the CoDominium series of science fiction stories by Jerry Pournelle and others
- Tanith, a planet in the novel Space Viking by H. Beam Piper
- Tanith (Gaunt's Ghosts), the former homeworld of the Tanith First-and-Only, who are the subject of the Gaunt's Ghosts novels by Dan Abnett
- Tanith, a planet in David Brin's Uplift Universe

== Other uses ==
- 5869 Tanith, an Amor asteroid discovered in 1988 by Carolyn S. Shoemaker
