= Mix & Match =

Mix & Match may refer to:

- Mix & Match, Hoosier Lottery
- Mix & Match, Pennsylvania Lottery
- Mix & Match, a 2014 South Korean reality survival show that formed iKon
- Mix & Match (EP), EP by Loona Odd Eye Circle
- Mix & match COVID-19 vaccination, a cross-vaccination of multiple COVID-19 vaccines
- Mix and match competitions in social dance, otherwise known as Jack and Jill competitions
