= Jack Carey =

Jack Carey may refer to:

- Jack Carey (musician)
- Jack Carey (dancer)
