= Ó Ciardha =

Irish surname

Ó Ciardha, modern spelling Ó Ciara: Anglicised Carey, Keary, Kearey, Carry, O Carry. Mainly a midland (Leinster) surname. One major sept of Ó Ciardha was that of Carbury in modern County Kildare, which receives very early mention in the Irish Annals, such as the Annals of Ulster in 954 AD, 'ua Ciardai, ri Cairpri', i.e. O Carey, king of Carbury, and the Annals of Tigernach in 993 AD.

Other names are also Anglicised Carey, including Ó Ciaráin (Munster), Ó Céirín (Connaught, Munster). All three of these patronymics have Old Irish root 'ciar' or 'céir'- 'dark, black'.

== See also ==
- Carey (surname)
