= George Cary =

George Cary may refer to:

- Sir George Cary (of Cockington) (died 1617), English administrator in Ireland
- George Cary (British Army officer) (1712–1792), British Army general
- George Cary (Georgia politician) (1789–1843), congressman from Georgia
- George B. Cary (1811–1850), congressman from Virginia
- George Hunter Cary (1832–1866), British barrister and Canadian politician
- George Cary Eggleston (1839–1911), American writer
- George Cary (priest) (1611–1680), Dean of Exeter
- George Cary (architect) (1859–1945), American architect

== See also ==
- George Carey (disambiguation)
