= Paul Carey (politician) =

American government official (1962–2001)

- Born: Paul Robert Carey; October 18, 1962; New York City, U.S.
- Died: June 14, 2001 (aged 38); New York City, U.S.
- Occupation: 77th Commissioner of the Securities and Exchange Commission
- Known for: White House Special Assistant to U.S. President Bill Clinton
- Father: Hugh Carey

Paul Robert Carey (October 18, 1962 – June 14, 2001) was an American public servant from the State of New York. During his career, he served as a White House Special Assistant to U.S. President Bill Clinton and as the 77th Commissioner of the Securities and Exchange Commission.

== Early life and education ==
He was born on October 18, 1962, in Brooklyn, New York. He was one of 14 children growing up, and was the seventh son of New York Governor Hugh Carey and Helen (Owen) Carey. He grew up in Brooklyn, Shelter Island, and the New York State Executive Mansion in Albany. As a boy, he cared for developmentally challenged people at Camp Shelter Island. As a young man, he worked with physically challenged skiers. Two of his olders brother died in a car accident in 1969 as teenagers. His mother died in 1974, the year his father was first elected New York governor. He graduated from the Doane Stuart School in Albany before receiving a B.A. in economics from Colgate University in Hamilton, New York.

== Career ==
After college, Carey worked as an investment banker in the securities industry, focusing on equity investments for institutional clients. In 1992, he joined the Clinton-Gore Presidential Campaign, serving as northeast finance director. Carey became a special assistant to the president for legislative affairs in February 1993. As a congressional liaison, he specialized in finance and banking issues, also consulting the president on judicial appointments and helping "shepherd nominees through the Senate confirmation process." He also helped handle housing, securities, and other related issues. Carey was noteworthy for being President Clinton's main connection to U.S. Senators Alfonse D'Amato and Daniel Patrick Moynihan of New York.

In 1997, President Clinton nominated Carey to the Securities and Exchange Commission to succeed outgoing commissioner, Steven Wallman. The Senate confirmed Carey on October 21, 1997, for a five-year term. As SEC commissioner, Carey championed private accounts for the investment of government Social Security funds. At the SEC, he also became the commission's "point man with Congress on the privatization of Social Security. He was serving at the SEC in 2001, and his term would have expired in 2002. While at the SEC as a Democrat, he backed SEC chairman Arthur Levitt Jr. on issues such as accounting reforms and opening stock markets for individual investors.

== Death and foundation ==
In 2001, he lived in Washington, D.C. That year he was hospitalized in Manhattan. Carey died on June 14, 2001 from a rare endocrine cancer called pheochromocytoma, at the age of 38. He was survived by 11 siblings and his father. After his death, his family established the Paul Robert Carey Foundation, which supports community organizations.

== See also ==
- List of people with surname Carey
- List of members of the Securities and Exchange Commission
