= Pauline Scanlon =

Irish singer

Pauline Scanlon (born in Dingle, County Kerry, Ireland) is a singer of contemporary and traditional Irish music.

Dingle is in the Corca Dhuibhne Gaeltacht, which is an area where the population's first language is Irish. Scanlon has been singing professionally since she was 15 years old. Tony Small, a singer from Galway and encyclopaedic collector of traditional songs, gave Pauline a repertoire of old folk tracks that were to become her first gigging material. Not long after, she started singing around Dingle in the pubs.

Scanlon has toured extensively worldwide with Sharon Shannon and has been featured on RTÉ's The Late Late Show. She featured on Sharon Shannon's Libertango album (2003), singing "A Case of You", originally by Joni Mitchell.

Her first solo album, Red Colour Sun, was released on the Daisy Label in 2004. (Compass Records in the US) It blended traditional sounds with modern influences. In January 2006, she completed a new project with Donogh Hennessy (formerly the guitar player for the Irish band Lúnasa) along with Darrell Scott, Kenny Malone, Stuart Duncan and other musicians. The album Hush was released on 15 August 2006 on Compass Records.

Scanlon sang backing vocals for Belinda Carlisle on her 2007 release Voila and for Gaelic Americana artist Kyle Carey on her albums Monongah and North Star.

In early 2009, she joined with Éilís Kennedy to form a band initially under the name of the Dingle White Females, later changed to Lumiere. Lumiere released their debut album (self-titled) on 11 September 2009 on the Sony Ireland label. It was followed by a second album in March 2013, called My Dearest Dear. Scanlon released the album Gossamer in May 2016.

In 2022 she released the album The Unquiet: Songs for my Mother to represent the life of her late mother. A 2026 TG4 documentary, Amhráin do mo Mháthair (Songs for my Mother), tells the story of her mother giving up her son for adoption and how he was reunited with the family 50 years later.
