= Tom Galati =

American soccer player

Personal information
- Date of birth: November 17, 1951 (age 74)
- Place of birth: St. Louis, Missouri, United States
- Height: 5 ft 8 in (1.73 m)
- Position: Defensive midfielder

Youth career
- 1970–1974: Southern Illinois-Edwardsville

Senior career*
Years	Team	Apps	(Gls)
1974–1976	Philadelphia Atoms	50	(1)
1977	Las Vegas Quicksilvers	11	(0)
1979–1980	St. Louis Steamers (indoor)	7	(1)

International career
1975	United States	1	(0)
- * Club domestic league appearances and goals

Tom Galati is a former U.S. soccer defensive midfielder who five seasons in the North American Soccer League. He also earned one cap with the U.S. national team.

== Youth and college ==
Galati grew up in St. Louis, Missouri where he attended McBride High School from 1966 to 1970. He then attended Southern Illinois University-Edwardsville where he played on the men's Division II soccer team from 1970 to 1974. In 1972, SIUE won the Division II national championship. Galati was a second team All-American in 1973 and was inducted, along with his teammates from the 1972 team, into the SIUE Athletic Hall of Fame in 2005 and was also inducted as an individual in 2010.

== Professional ==
In 1974, the expansion Philadelphia Atoms of the North American Soccer League (NASL) selected Galati in the first round of the NASL draft. That season, the Atoms won the NASL championship and Galati finished second in balloting for Rookie of the Year. The Atoms folded at the end of the 1976 season and the San Antonio Thunder picked Galati in the dispersal draft. In January 1977, the Washington Diplomats traded Charlie McCully and Chuck Carey, and its first-round 1978 draft pick to the San Antonio Thunder for Galati and the Thunder's first-round 1977 draft pick. Galati began the pre-season with the Dips, but was traded to the Las Vegas Quicksilvers in May 1977 in exchange for Art Welch. Galati also played in the 1975 NASL indoor tournament with the Atoms. In 1980, Galati moved to the St. Louis Steamers of Major Indoor Soccer League, but was released before the beginning of the season.

== National team ==
Galati earned one cap with the U.S. national team in a 7–0 loss to Poland on March 26, 1975. He came off for Alan Hamlyn at halftime.

He was inducted in the St. Louis Soccer Hall of Fame in 2007.
