= Carrey (surname) =

This is a list of people with the surname Carrey.

- Jacques Carrey (1649–1726), French artist who sketched the Parthenon frieze
- Jim Carrey (born 1962), Canadian film star of French extraction

== See also ==
- Cary (surname), a similar name
- Carry (disambiguation)
- Cary (disambiguation)
- List of people with surname Carey, a similar name
- Evolution of the Carrey (or Carey) surname in France
