= Nathaniel George Philips =

English painter and etcher

Nathaniel George Philips Esq.
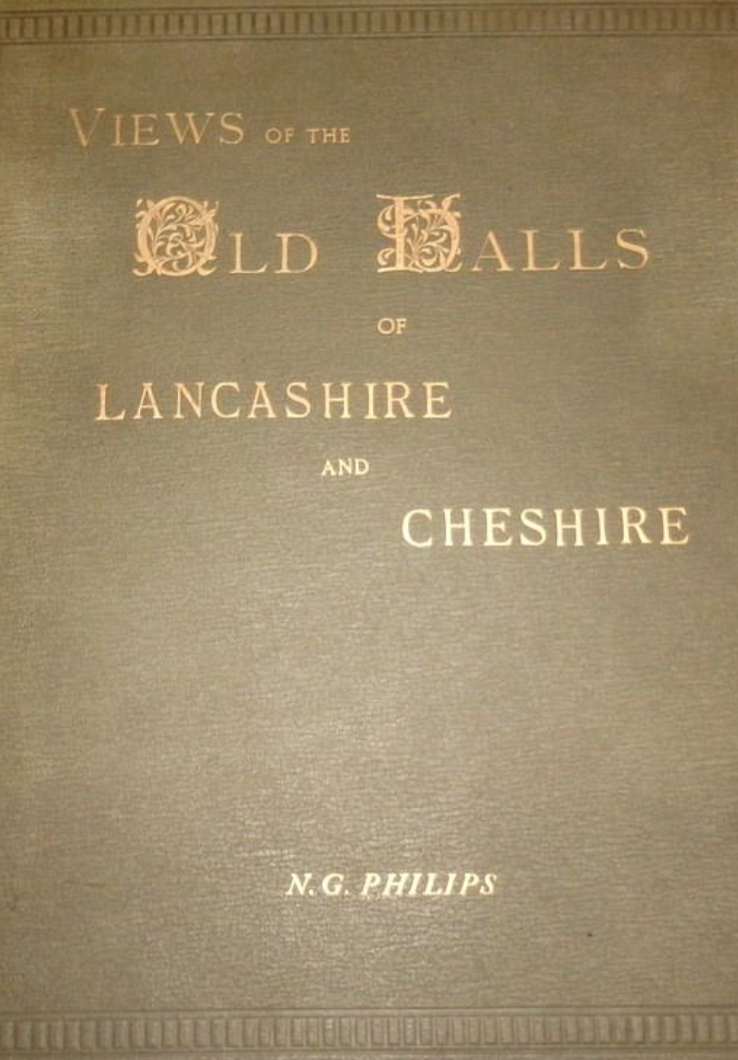
- Born: 9 June 1795; Manchester, England
- Died: 1 August 1831 (aged 36); Liverpool, England
- Resting place: Childwall
- Education: University of Edinburgh
- Occupations: Engraver, painter
- Notable work: Views of old halls of Lancashire and Cheshire
- Father: John Leigh Philips

Nathaniel George Philips (1795–1831) was an English painter trained in Edinburgh and member of the Academy of St Luke.

== Life ==
He was the youngest son of John Leigh Philips of Mayfield, Manchester, where he was born on 9 June 1795. He was educated at Manchester Grammar School, and entered the University of Edinburgh. While pursuing medical studies he made the acquaintance, of Sir William Allan and Scottish artists. A private income allowed him to go to Italy for three years.

On the death of Henry Fuseli, he was, in 1825, elected to fill his place as a member of the Academy of St. Luke. He settled as an artist in Liverpool.

Philips, who also practised etching, died unmarried at his residence, Rodney Street, Liverpool, on 1 August 1831.

== Works ==
Philips exhibited landscapes at the Liverpool Academy and the Royal Manchester Institution. The work by which he is best remembered is a series of twenty-eight engravings on copper, many of them from his own drawings, of old halls in Lancashire and Cheshire. These were originally issued in 1822–4 (possibly only 25 then printed). All were reissued in book form in 1893, letterpress by twenty-four local contributors, and a memoir of the artist.

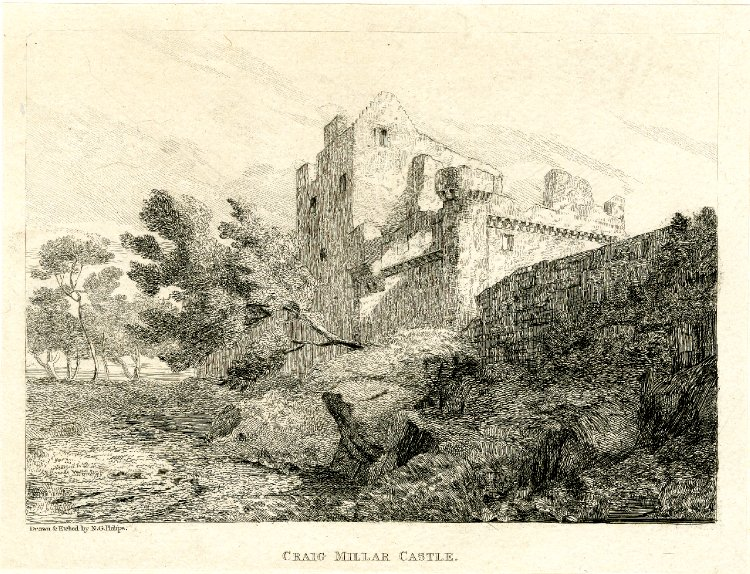
Craig Millar Castle, 1823.

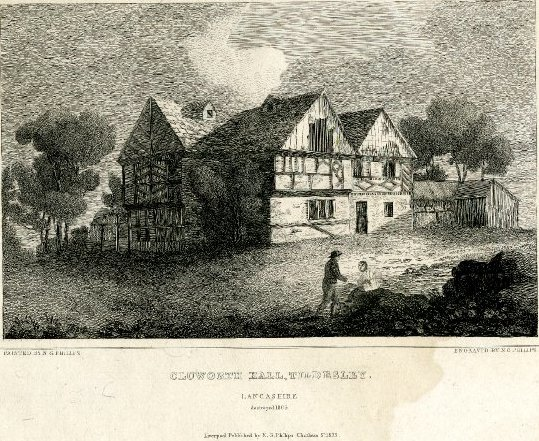
Cluworth Hall, 1823.

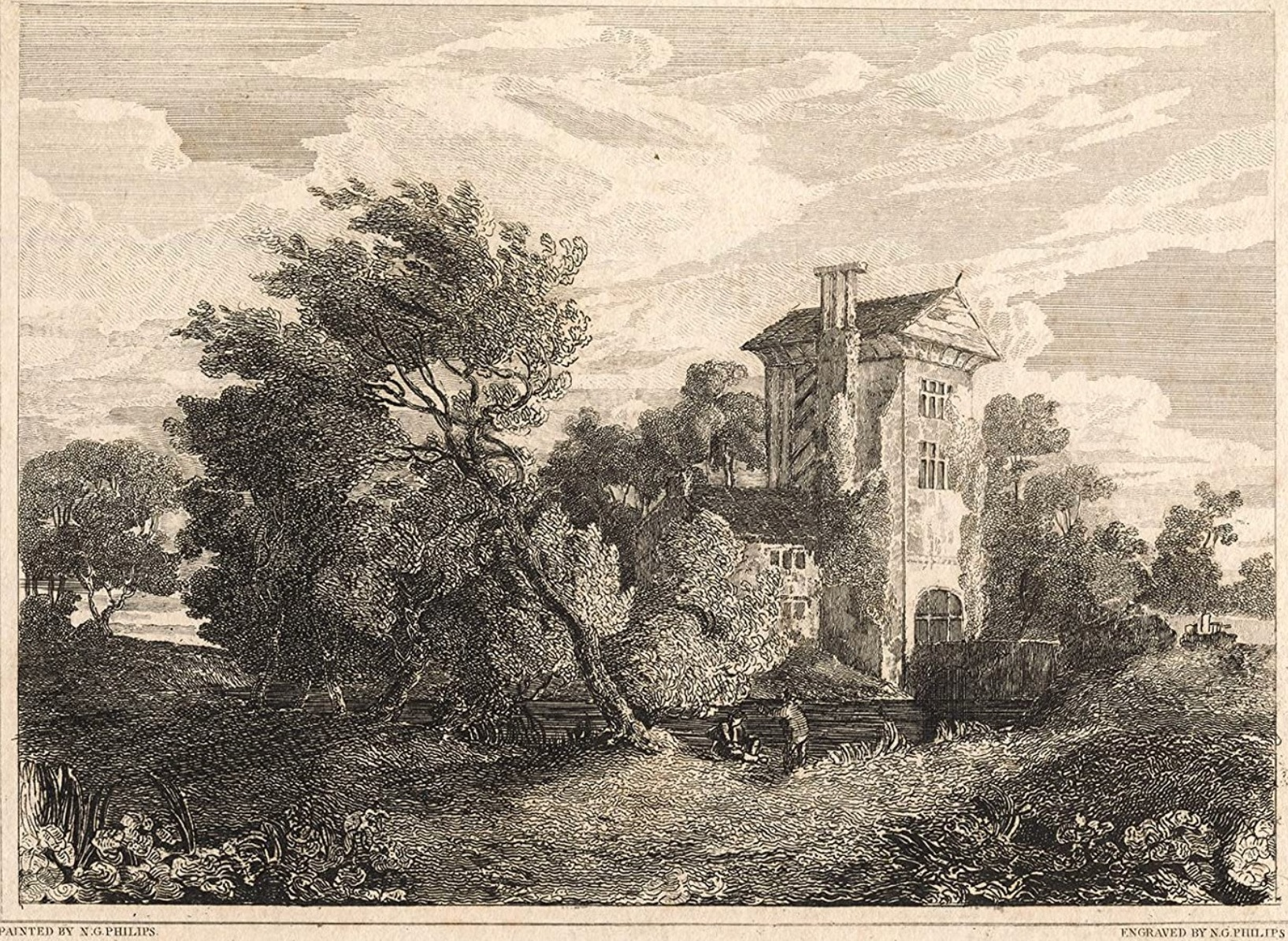
Old Hutt Gatehouse of the Manor of Halewood, 1820.
