= John Leigh Philips =

British manufacturer and art collector (1761–1814)

- Born: 1761
- Died: 1814 (aged 52–53)
- Occupation: Manufacturer
- Known for: Library and art collection

John Leigh Philips (1761–1814), was a manufacturer in Manchester, England.

== Early life ==
He was the son of John Philips (1734–1824), who founded the cotton spinning firm Philips & Lee. The family had significant community and legal connections; in addition to his cotton business John Philips held public office as Deputy Lieutenant for Cheshire, Justice of the Peace for Lancashire and Cheshire, and Chairman of Magistrates at Stockport. They were also related to the founders of textile manufacturers J. & N. Philips, who operated businesses in the Manchester area—John Philips (1724–1803), Nathaniel Philips (1726–1808) and Thomas Philips (1728–1811).

John Leigh Philips himself became involved in the textile industry. For a time he was in business with his brother Francis, who outlived him, dying in 1850.

As a young man Philips frequented the Roscoe Circle in Liverpool—the intellectual group around William Roscoe—meeting there William Paulet Carey, James Currie and Daniel Daulby.

== Military service ==
In late 1803 Philips was granted command of the First Regiment of the Manchester and Salford Corps, a volunteer militia which served as part of Britain's Home Guard during the French Revolutionary Wars. His brother Francis was appointed to a subordinate role in the same corps alongside three of his cousins.

The Philips' family's elevated social status encouraged John Leigh Philips to consider himself the natural leader of Manchester's military establishment. He was therefore offended when another militia commander, Joseph Hanson of the Salford and Stockport Independent Rifles, declared himself "Lieutenant Colonel Commandant" with authority over all local volunteer corps. Hanson's claim rested on his corps being older and larger than others in the district, and formed after letters of encouragement from the Earl of Derby acting as Lord Lieutenant of Lancashire, and from Britain's Secretary of State Lord Hawkesbury. Philips rejected these arguments and publicly questioned Hanson's loyalty to the Crown.

When Hanson refused to concede, a furious Philips challenged him to a duel and the two men met on Kersal Moor on 28 July 1804. At the moment they were about to shoot the duel was broken up by constables from Manchester. Philips and Hanson were arrested, but released after a caution to keep the peace.

Undeterred, Philips began a lengthy correspondence with both the Earl of Derby and Lord Hawkesbury, seeking adjudication of the dispute in his favour. Derby replied first, supporting Hanson's claim but refusing to get further involved. After some delay Hawkesbury also replied, and in blunter terms. Hanson's right to the title of Lieutenant Colonel Commandant was upheld and Philips was rebuked for "disputing the authority under which the [militia] regulations were made."

Philips immediately resigned from the militia, as did all 53 officers of his regiment. Leaderless, the regiment itself collapsed and its men were subsumed into other companies.

== Later life ==
An early adopter of gas lighting, he introduced it in the family business in 1805.

Philips was also a good friend of Joseph Wright of Derby.

== Legacy ==
Philips purchased natural history illustrations produced by John Abbot and other illustrators.. He collected over a number of different areas.

After Philips died, his book and art collections were sold. Also for sale was his "cabinet of insects", in three showcases, which was bought by Thomas Henry Robinson with the natural history collection, for over £5,000. It was acquire by a group who in 1821 set up the Manchester Natural History Society (properly the ""Manchester Society for the Promotion of Natural History"). A meeting was called for 30 June 1821, for the specific purpose of preserving the entomological and ornithological collections of Philips: as well as Robinson, Edward Holme and other members of the Manchester Literary and Philosophical Society attended. Thirty members joined. A new building for the collection was opened in 1835. That museum later became the Manchester Museum.

== Family ==
Philips married Caroline Renny, and they had five children. The youngest was Nathaniel George Philips.
