= Ron Neil =

Ronald John Baillie Neil CBE (born June 1942) is a former BBC television journalist and news editor, who rose to become the BBC's overall director of news and current affairs in the late 1980s. He retired in 1998, but was recalled in 2004 to review BBC journalism and values in response to the criticisms made by the Hutton inquiry into the circumstances surrounding the death of Dr David Kelly.

== Career ==
Originally a newspaper reporter from Glasgow, he joined BBC Scotland in 1967 as a radio reporter based in Aberdeen, just as the television service moved to a more hard news agenda with the inception of Reporting Scotland the following year. One story he covered for Reporting Scotland was the loss of the Longhope lifeboat in 1969. He has supported the lifeboats ever since, and as of 2009 is deputy chairman of the RNLI board of trustees.

He moved in 1969 to the Current Affairs Department in London to become a producer on the new series Nationwide, on which he worked until 1976, eventually becoming its output editor. Later he was editor of Tonight (1979) and That's Life! (1981).

In 1980 he co-created Newsnight working alongside George Carey from News, taking over as the programme's editor in 1981 and directing its coverage of the Falklands War. He then became the first editor of the BBC's Breakfast Time format, the UK's first national breakfast show when it began in 1983, which scooped the much more staid approach of its commercial rival TV-am by adopting a carefully relaxed and much more informal style.

In 1984 he became founder editor of the BBC Six O'Clock News, reclaiming a traditionally strong slot where the BBC had lost its way with the previous Sixty Minutes format. The result was such a success that its style and even opening titles remained unchanged for almost ten years.

He then became overall Editor of Television News, and then Director of News and Current Affairs in 1988, and head of regional broadcasting the next year. His final job at the BBC was as the first Chief Executive of Production, after the corporation organisationally split production from broadcasting in 1996. He was a member of the BBC's Board of Management for 12 years. He retired in 1998, and was appointed a CBE in the 1999 New Year Honours list.

== Personal life ==
Ron Neil now lives in Teddington, with his wife Isobel.

Media offices
Preceded by George Carey	Editor of Newsnight; 1981–1982	Succeeded by David Lloyd
