= Bill Carey (footballer) =

Australian rules footballer, born 1905

Personal information
- Full name: William Carey
- Born: 30 December 1905; Mansfield, Victoria
- Died: 1 December 1973 (aged 67); Warburton, Victoria
- Original team: Alexandra
- Height: 175 cm (5 ft 9 in)
- Weight: 78 kg (172 lb)
- Position: Fullback

Playing career^{1}
Years	Club	Games (Goals)
1929–32	Hawthorn	59 (6)
1933	Swan Hill	
1934–35	Camberwell (VFA)	35 (0)
- ^{1} Playing statistics correct to the end of 1935.

Bill Carey (30 December 1905 – 1 December 1973) was an Australian rules footballer who played with Hawthorn in the Victorian Football League (VFL).

Carey commenced his football career in country Victoria, first playing at Alexandra, then Eildon Weir and then Mansfield. He moved to Hawthorn in 1929 where he played for for four years, usually as a full back, and developed a reputation as a sound defender.

In 1933, Carey accepted a position as captain-coach of Swan Hill where he led them to a semi final.

In 1934, Carey moved to Victorian Football Association side Camberwell, where he played for two years making a total of 35 appearances.
