= Richard Adams Carey =

American writer (born 1951)

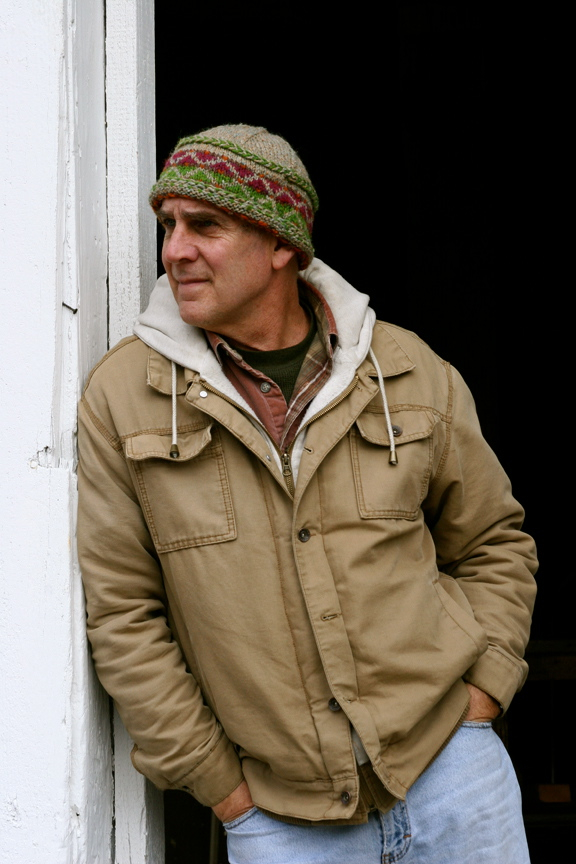
Richard Adams Carey

Richard Adams Carey (born October 18, 1951) is an American writer best known for Against the Tide: The Fate of the New England Fisherman (ISBN 978-0-618-05698-9), a nonfiction chronicle of the 1995-96 fishing season in the lives of four Cape Cod commercial fishermen. The New York Times called Against the Tide "deep ecological journalism at its best, an effective and compassionate chronicle of a threatened way of life, and a worthy successor to such classic portraits of American fishermen as William W. Warner's Beautiful Swimmers and Peter Matthiessen's Men's Lives".

== Biography ==
Carey grew up in West Hartford, Connecticut. He attended the Loomis School (now Loomis-Chaffee) and then Harvard University. He worked various low-paying jobs before teaching for ten years in the Yup'ik villages of southwest Alaska, where he learned the Yup'ik language (Yugtun). He published magazine articles about his experiences in Alaska in Country Journal, Alaska, the Boston Globe Magazine, Harvard Magazine, and the Massachusetts Review. He also published general interest material in Yankee and New England Monthly.

Carey's first book, Raven's Children: An Alaskan Culture at Twilight, was published in 1992 (ISBN 978-0-395-48677-1). Honored as a 1992 New York Public Library "Book to Remember", this chronicled a summer spent living, hunting, and fishing in Kongiganak and Bethel, Alaska, with a Yup'ik family. An excerpt is included in the anthology A Reader's Companion to Alaska, edited by Alan Ryan (1997, ISBN 978-0-544-31178-7).

Against the Tide appeared in 1999 and won the 2001 New Hampshire Literary Award for Nonfiction. The Philosopher Fish: Sturgeon, Caviar, and the Geography of Desire was published in 2005 (ISBN 978-1-58243-352-3). This describes the natural history of the sturgeon and provides a history and globetrotting portrait of the caviar industry: its fishermen, brokers, chefs, smugglers, watchdogs, and aquaculturists. The book was excerpted in Harvard Magazine. An updated version of the book released in 2024 won that year's Bookseller/Diagram Prize for Oddest Title of the Year.

Carey has also published short fiction, most recently in Hunger Mountain, the VCFA Journal of the Arts: "Our Own Version of Iowa" and "Ruby Thursday". His fourth book of nonfiction, In the Evil Day: Violence Comes to One Small Town, describes a 1997 shooting rampage by Carl Drega in Colebrook, New Hampshire. The book was by published in September 2015 (ISBN 978-1611687156) on the ForeEdge imprint of the University Press of New England.

Carey currently lives in Sandwich, New Hampshire, and taught from 2006 to 2019 in Southern New Hampshire University's MFA in Fiction and Nonfiction program. He regularly reviews new books on fishing, the outdoors, Alaska, and rural New England for the Wall Street Journal, and is the father of 'Gaelic Americana' singer/songwriter Kyle Carey.
