= Chuck Carey =

American soccer player (born 1953)

Personal information
- Date of birth: August 12, 1953 (age 73)
- Place of birth: Bethesda, Maryland, U.S.
- Position: Defender

Youth career
- 1971–1974: Chico State

Senior career*
Years	Team	Apps	(Gls)
1975	San Jose Earthquakes	0	(0)
1975–1976	San Antonio Thunder	8	(0)
1976	Portland Timbers	1	(0)
1978–1979	Detroit Express		

Managerial career
- 1976: Chico State (assistant)
- * Club domestic league appearances and goals

Chuck Carey (born August 12, 1953) is an American retired soccer defender who played professionally in the North American Soccer League.

== Youth ==
Carey attended California State University, Chico where he played on the men's soccer team from 1971 to 1974. He earned his bachelor's degree in religious studies in 1975. In 1980, he returned to earn master's degree in physical education. In 2002, the university inducted Carey into the Athletic Hall of Fame.

== Professional ==
In 1975, Carey signed with the San Jose Earthquakes of the North American Soccer League. The Earthquakes sent him to the San Antonio Thunder during the season. In 1976, the Thunder sent Carey to the Portland Timbers. On January 10, 1977, the Timbers sent him to the Washington Diplomats. Three days later, the Diplomats traded Carey, Charlie McCully and its 1978 first round draft pick to the San Antonio Thunder in exchange for Thunder's first round draft pick and Tom Galati. However, the Thunder moved to Hawaii soon after to become Team Hawaii and Carey did not make the move with the team. In 1978, he signed with the Detroit Express and spent two seasons with them.
