= Kyle Carey =

American singer (born 1988)

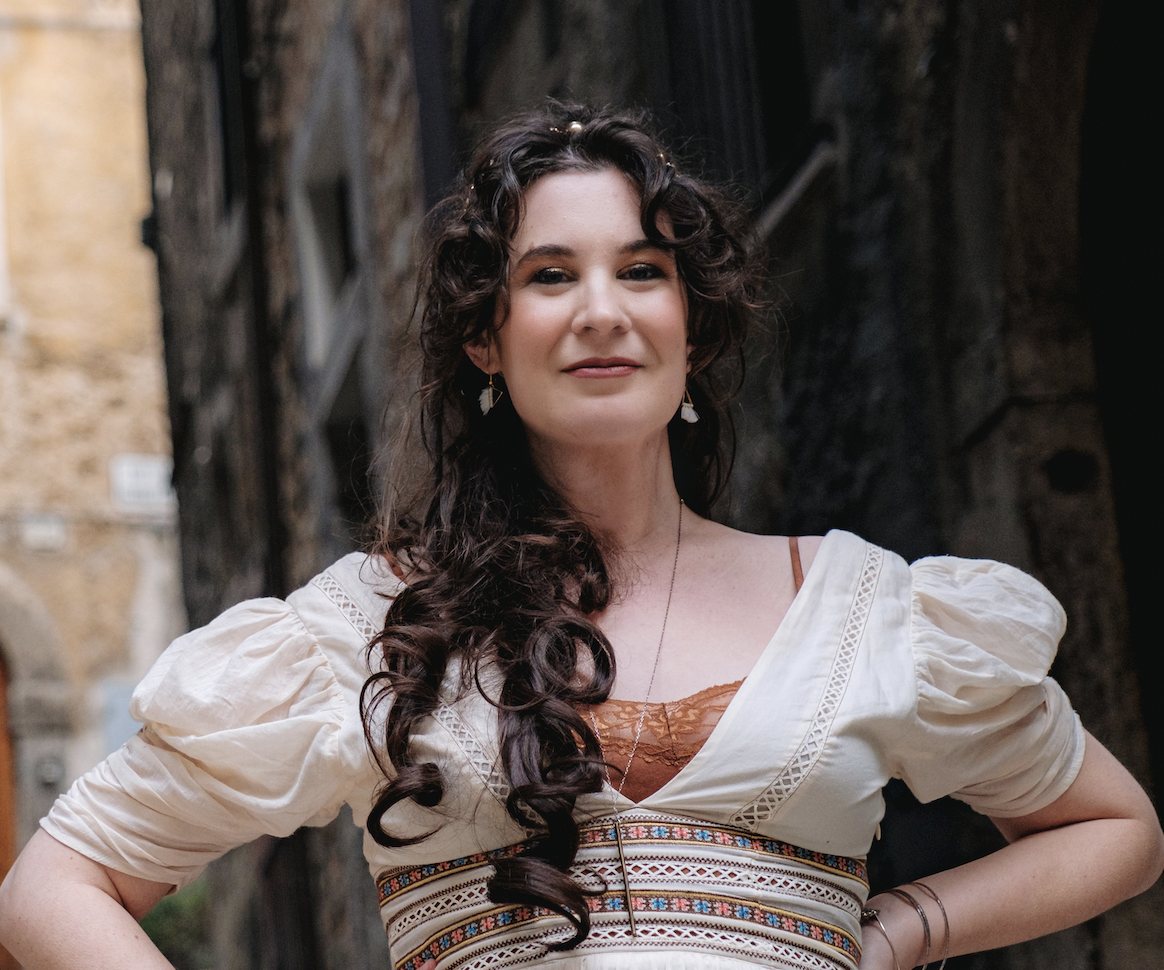
- Kyle Carey in 2022

Background information
- Born: Kyle Anne Carey; 1988 (age 37–38); Laconia, NH, United States
- Genres: Celtic, Americana
- Occupation: Musical artist
- Instruments: Guitar, vocals, ukulele, shruti box
- Website: www.kyleannecarey.com

Kyle Carey (born 1988) is a Celtic Americana musical artist who creates a synthesis of music called 'Gaelic Americana'.

== Biography ==
Born in New Hampshire to schoolteacher parents, Kyle lived in Yup'ik native communities in the Alaskan bush until the age of seven, before her family re-located permanently to New Hampshire. She attended Holderness School and Skidmore College, where she studied English literature, and spent the weekends as a waitress at Caffè Lena – receiving the prestigious President's Award upon her graduation. Afterward, she traveled to Cape Breton in Nova Scotia on a Fulbright Fellowship to study Scottish Gaelic song and traditional music. In 2009–2010 she attended Sabhal Mòr Ostaig on the Isle of Skye for a year, obtaining a certificate in Scottish Gaelic language and music and becoming a fluent Gaelic speaker.

== Recordings ==
Kyle began her professional career in music when she traveled to Dingle, Ireland, in 2011 and recorded her debut album Monongah, a mix of Celtic, Appalachian folk, and literary elements that would become the trademark of her unique 'Gaelic Americana' style. The album was produced by Lùnasa guitarist Donogh Hennessy and the title track inspired by a poem of the same title by Appalachian poet Louise McNeill. Among the musicians who contributed are Irish singers Pauline Scanlon, former Cherish the Ladies member Aoife Clancy, former The Cottars member Rosie MacKenzie, as well as bassist Trevor Hutchinson. Monongah was well received by reviewers and included by respected music critic Patricia Herlevi at World Music Central in her choice of "Top 10 World Music albums of 2011". In 2012 Kyle toured the Netherlands with Dutch guitarist Bart-Jan Baartmans.

In 2013 Kyle released an EP of traditional May carols called One Morning in May, a collaborative project with English BBC Folk Award-winning duo Josienne Clarke and Ben Walker. The collection contains three traditional British May carols, as well as an arrangement of the well-known folk ballad "One Morning in May".

In September 2014 Kyle released her second full-length album, North Star. Produced by Séamus Egan, the album features nine originals, two songs in Scottish Gaelic, and a cover of "Across the Great Divide" by Kate Wolf. Artists who contributed to the album include Dirk Powell, Natalie Haas, Pauline Scanlon, Chris Stout and Scottish percussionist James MacKintosh of Capercaillie. North Star was ranked No. 7 in the "Top Albums of September 2014" by the Acoustic Music Scene.

In January 2018 Kyle released her third full-length album, The Art of Forgetting on the World Music Network, record label 'Riverboat Records'. The album was produced by Dirk Powell and includes eight originals, three songs in Scottish Gaelic, and a cover of "Trouble in the Fields" by Nanci Griffith. Literary influences in Carey's original songs include the poetry of Louise McNeill, Edna St. Vincent Millay, Elizabeth Bishop, Robert Frost and W. B. Yeats, as well as the prose of Charles Dickens. Guest artists on the album included Rhiannon Giddens, John McCusker, Mike McGoldrick, Sam Broussard, Kai Welch and James MacKintosh.The Art of Forgetting landed at #3 on the January 2018 Folk DJ Charts and #24 on the February 2018 Euroamericana Charts. Influential Webzine 'PopMatters' named it one of the '20 Best Folk Albums of 2018'.

In December 2020 Kyle released a holiday EP entitled 'Ash & Amaryllis: Songs for a Winter's Night'. The album was recorded in Woodstock, NY and produced by Julie Last. The EP was originally conceptualized as a duet between voice and double bass and features Lou Pappas on the upright bass.

In September 2025, Kyle released her fourth full-length album, ‘The Last Bough’ which was produced by Kai Welch, recorded in Nashville and features such artists as Ruth Moody, Anthony Da Costa, Christian Sedelmyer and Micheal McGoldrick. The album chronicles her and her husband Carmine’s struggles with infertility, the birth of their son Asher, and their first years as a young family in their self-made tiny house on wheels. KYLE CAREY – The Last Bough

In September 2025, ‘The Last Bough’ was #9 on the FAI Folk Charts and #20 on the Euro Americana Charts for the month of November .

== Personal life ==
Kyle Carey is the daughter of non-fiction writer Richard Adams Carey and a direct descendant of the Adams and Quincy Adams families. In 2017 she became engaged to Italian philosopher and 2016 'Gaelic Learner of the Year' Carmine Colajezzi. Kyle is based in Vermont. In 2022 their son Asher, was born.

== Discography ==
- Monongah, 2011
- One Morning in May EP, 2013
- North Star, 2014
- The Art of Forgetting, 2018
- Ash & Amaryllis: Songs for a Winter's Night EP, 2020
- Mo Dhuilichinn Single, 2021
- The Last Bough, 2025
