= Thomas Carey (cricketer) =

American-born Irish cricketer and British colonial administrator

The Honourable Thomas Carey
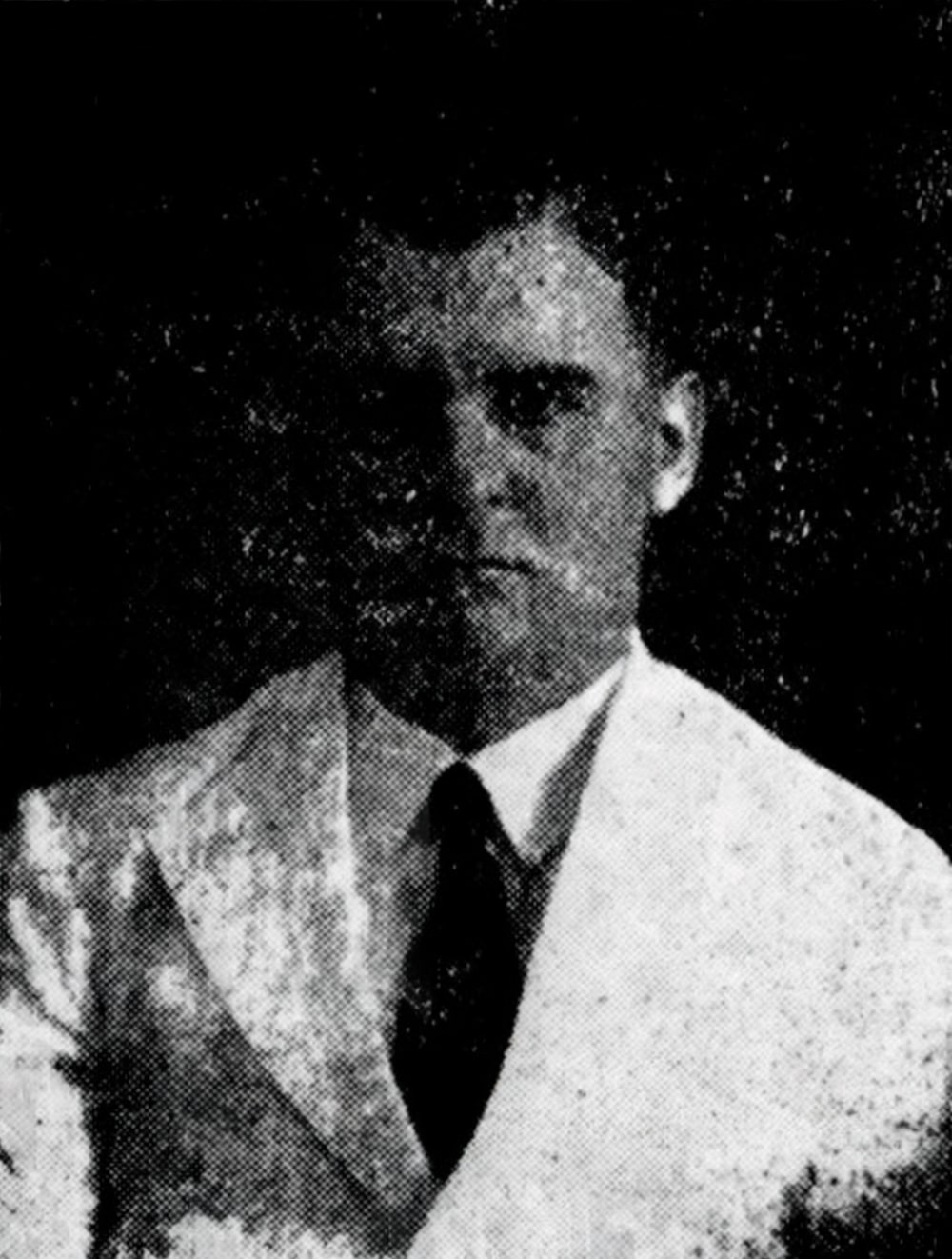
- Carey, c. 1936

11th British Resident to Brunei
- In office 1931–1934
- Monarch: George VI
- Preceded by: Patrick McKerron
- Succeeded by: Roland Evelyn Turnbull

Personal details
- Born: 12 February 1903 Fresno, California, United States
- Died: 4 December 1966 (aged 63) Thorpe St Andrew, Norfolk, England
- Education: The King's Hospital
- Alma mater: Trinity College Dublin (BA)
- Cricket career

Cricket information
- Batting: Right-handed
- Bowling: Right-arm medium

Domestic team information
- Years: Team
- 1924: Dublin University

Career statistics
Competition	First-class
Matches	1
Runs scored	21
Batting average	10.50
100s/50s	–/–
Top score	15
Balls bowled	54
Wickets	2
Bowling average	20.50
5 wickets in innings	–
10 wickets in match	–
Best bowling	2/41
Catches/stumpings	–/–
- Source: Cricinfo, 4 January 2022

Thomas Falkland Carey (12 February 1903 – 4 December 1966) was an American-born Irish cricketer and British colonial administrator.

== Biography ==
=== Education ===
Carey received his education at The King's Hospital, and later Dublin and Trinity College where he earned his B.A. in 1925.

=== Colonial service ===
In January 1926, Carey began his career as a cadet win the Federated Malay States (FMS). He later became an assistance controller in Malacca, April 1927. Later that year in June, he was transferred to Negeri Sembilan. After a year, he was assigned to Kuala Lumpur, and finally Klang in August 1928. He served as British Resident in Brunei from 1931 to 1934. His 1931 annual report, for example, illustrates colonial presumptions that Indian labour was acceptable.

=== Sports career ===
Carey was born in California. A right-handed batsman and right-arm medium pace bowler, he played one first-class match for Dublin University, an innings defeat against Northamptonshire County Cricket Club in June 1924. He died in Thorpe St Andrew, Norwich, England, aged 63. A street as named after him in Kuala Belait, Jalan Carey.

Diplomatic posts
Preceded by Patrick McKerron	British Resident to Brunei; 1931–1934	Succeeded by Roland Evelyn Turnbull
