= Sas Carey =

American film director

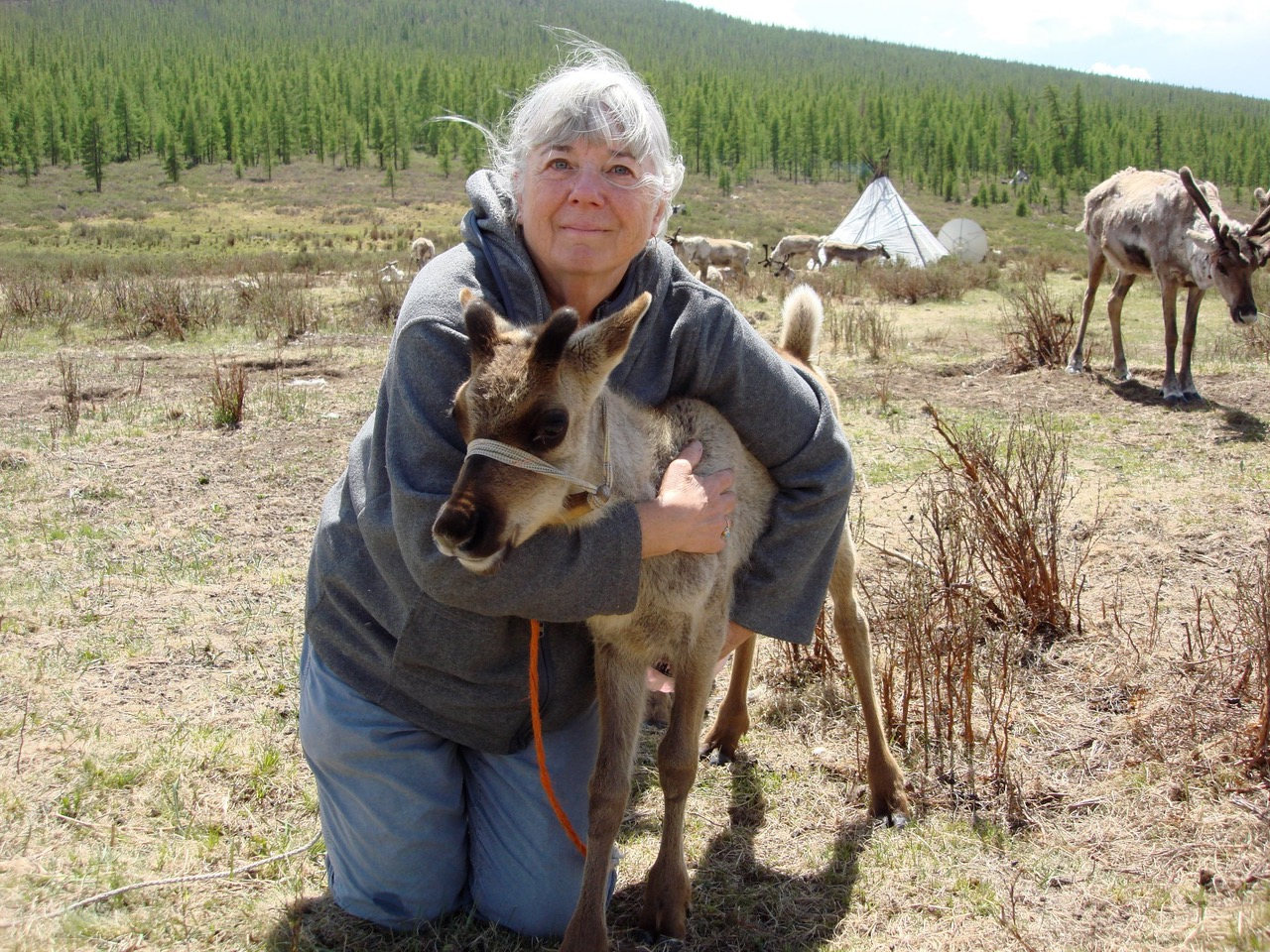
- Occupations: Director/producer author teacher nurse healer
- Website: www.nomadicare.org

Sas Carey (born 1945) (aka SallyAnn Carey) is an American film director, author, teacher, holistic nurse, and spiritual healer. She is best known for her four feature documentaries: Gobi Women's Song, Ceremony, Migration and Transition and her two books Reindeer Herders in My Heart: Stories of Healing Journeys in Mongolia, and Marrying Mongolia: A Memoir. She founded the non-profit Nomadicare, which works to support and preserve traditional Mongolian nomadic culture through healthcare, films and stories.

== Personal life ==
Carey was born in the state of Washington, United States, at the end of World War II. She later moved to the Northeastern United States, where she pursued a degree in education at Western Connecticut State University and Keene State College. She later received a Bachelor of Science in Nursing (1982) and Master of Education (1988) degree from the University of Vermont. She has lived in Mongolia, France, Sweden, China and Denmark, where she was a foreign student with the American Field Service (1962), and currently lives and works in Middlebury, Vermont. Carey is a mother, grandmother, and Quaker.

== Career ==
=== Holistic nursing and prevention ===
After teaching second grade and working as a professional clay sculptor, Carey became a Registered Nurse and started a private practice in holistic nursing. She also founded the Alternatives for Teens program, which promotes teens' discussion of issues important to them and sets up group events as alternatives to drug and alcohol use. In 1990, the program received one of ten Exemplary Prevention Programs Awards given nationally from the United States Department of Health and Human Services. In 1999, she was hired as an Office of Safe and Healthy Students consultant for the state of Vermont.

=== Study and work in Mongolia ===
In 1994, Carey traveled to China and Mongolia as an American Holistic Nurses Association delegate with the People to People Student Ambassador Program. In 1995, she returned to Mongolia under a grant to study Traditional Mongolian medicine (TMM) with Dr. B. Boldsaikhan at the Institute of Traditional Medicine in Ulaanbaatar. She became one of the first two Americans to receive a certificate of Physician of Traditional Mongolian Medicine, an experience documented in the film Steppe Herbs, Mare's Milk, and Jelly Jars.

Following her study of TMM, she worked in Mongolia as a Health Education Training Specialist with the World Bank/UN Development Programme, consulting for the Water, Sanitation and Hygiene Education Programme for the 21st Century.

While working in Mongolia, Carey became familiar with nomadic herders living a traditional lifestyle in the Gobi Desert. In 2001–2004, she conducted a study of health practices in Manlai, South Gobi, interviewing doctors, nurses, bonesetters, administrators, and nomadic women. The study became the basis of her 2006 documentary Gobi Women's Song, of which a Mongolian ambassador has stated, "This is the real life of the people living in the Gobi Desert of Mongolia. I am from this place. I was born and grew up there".

Following the study in the Gobi, Carey conducted a seven-year assessment of the health of the Dukha reindeer herders in northern Mongolia. The healthcare database that was developed resulted in a program that provides key vitamins to the people of the community. Carey continues to provide energy healing and remains actively involved in the Dukha community.

From this study, the NGO Nomadicare provided training for all rural (sum) clinic/hospitals in South Gobi and Khovsgol Provinces in 2010 and 2012. Eighty doctors and health practitioners were trained in either traditional Mongolian medicine or in Laboratory Safety Techniques and Testing, impacting the health care options for a population of 175,000.

Previous Mongolian Ambassador to the United States Khasbazaryn Bekhbat stated "Our country is richer by [Sas Carey’s] presence over many years."

=== Nomadicare and Life Energy Healing School ===
After returning from Mongolia, Carey founded the Life Energy Healing School to teach students energy healing and health and prevention techniques using Traditional Mongolian Medicine and modern health practices. The school was based out of Middlebury, and included a correspondence and study-abroad curriculum, requiring prerequisites in western health sciences.

Carey also continued her work in the Gobi and taiga by founding the non-profit NGO Nomadicare, which supported the sustainability and cultural survival of nomadic peoples in Mongolia by harmonizing traditional and modern medicine and documenting nomadic ways. She has traveled to rural Mongolia nearly every year since 1994. In 2003, Carey extended Nomadicare's work to include the Dukha reindeer herders of the Mongolian taiga. One traveler in the taiga described Carey: "in her mid-60s and a reluctant horsewoman, but she has spent the past summers riding to the 44 nomadic families in East Taiga to collect data". Nomadicare provided traditional Mongolian medicine training, laboratory supplies, and general training to rural Gobi and northern Mongolia's rural health centers' health professionals. American and Mongolian life sciences students also studied with nomadic peoples Jane Goodall, PhD, said "I fully support the work of [Sas Carey’s] Nomadicare as it seeks to preserve Mongolia’s nomads through health care." Today, Nomadicare is focused on preserving the traditional culture of Mongolia through healthcare, films, and stories.

In addition to Steppe Herbs, Mare's Milk, and Jelly Jars and Gobi Women's Song, Carey has produced a number of films about the Dukha herders. Her early films have been presented at the Rubin Museum of Art, Green Mountain Film Festival, Vermont International Film Festival, and the Woodstock Film Festival.

In 2016 Migration won the Earth's Choice Award at the Earth Day Film Festival, San Francisco. It also received the Honorable Mention award from the International Film Awards Berlin (ifab 2016). The Kasutaja Pärnu Filmifestival | Pärnu International Documentary Film Festival granted Migration The Best Scientific Audiovisual Recording Award (2016). Migration is shown on Mongolian International Airlines during their international flights.

Her later films, Migration, Transition, and Gobi Children's Song have won over sixty awards on five continents.

Carey's 2012 book, Reindeer Herders in My Heart: Stories of Healing Journeys in Mongolia, has been translated into Mongolian and French. Her 2023 book, Marrying Mongolia: A Memoir is available in hardcover and as an audiobook.

Carey actively promotes knowledge of and assistance for Mongolian nomads through talks, seminars, and screenings in the United States and internationally. Her main focus is to increase awareness of Mongolian culture.

== Filmography ==
- Shanghai Market Scenes (1995)
- Nadaam Festival (1995)
- Steppe Herbs, Mare's Milk, and Jelly Jars: A Journey into Mongolian Medicine (1997)
- Shamans Among the Reindeer Herders (2004)
- Dukha Reindeer Herders Moving (2004)
- Gobi Women's Song (2006), re-released with the short film Revisiting Gobi Women in 2011
- Taiga Heart Song (2007)
- Ceremony (2015)
- Migration (2016)
- Transition (2020)
- Gobi Children's Song (2022)

== Publications ==
- Life Skills for Teens: The Group Leader's Guide to Alternatives for Teens (Addison County Parent Child Center, 1989)
- A Spiritual Journey From Vermont to Mongolia and Back, Everchanging Magazine. January–February 1996.
- Developing Your Intuition Correspondence Course (1997)
- Searching for Mongolian Medicine in the Gobi Desert, Ayur Vijnada (a periodical on Indo-Tibetan and allied medical cultures). West Bengal, India. 2002. Reprinted in German in Germany 2004. Reprinted by the Mongolian Society.
- Reindeer Herders in My Heart: Stories of Healing Journeys in Mongolia. (Taiga memoir. Travel. Healing) 2012. Wren Song Press.
- Marrying Mongolia: A Memoir. 2023. International Polar Institute.
