= John Carey (classical scholar) =

Irish classical scholar

John Carey LL.D. (1756–1826) was an Irish classical scholar.

== Life ==
He was a brother of Mathew Carey and William Paulet Carey. At the age of 12 he was sent to finish his education in a French university. He spent some time in the United States about 1789, and then spent passed many years in London as a teacher of the classics, French, and shorthand. He died at Prospect Place, Lambeth, after a period of illness, on 8 December 1826, from a bladder stone.

== Works ==
Carey was editor of the early numbers of the School Magazine, published by Richard Phillips, and a contributor to the Monthly Magazine and Gentleman's Magazine. He brought out:

- a new edition of John Dryden's Virgil in 1803, and again in 1819;
- two editions of Robert Ainsworth's Latin Dictionary, and five of its abridgment;
- the Gradus ad Parnassum in 1824;
- the Latin Common Prayer in Samuel Bagster's polyglot edition;
- Ruperti Commentarius in Livium; and
- a revision of Johann Friedrich Schleusner's New Testament Lexicon (1826).

Carey edited over fifty volumes of the Regent Latin Classics published by Baldwin. He was the compiler of the General Index to the Monthly Review from 1790 to 1816 (2 vols. 1818), and translated Paul Jérémie Bitaubé's Batavians, Madame de Staël's Young Emigrants, Lehman's Letters on Switzerland, and others. In 1810 he published a story for children called Learning better than House and Land, which went through several editions. His school-books were popular in their day and generally praised for accuracy and scholarly qualities. Among them are:

- Latin Prosody made Easy, 1800; new edition 1812.
- Practical English Prosody and Versification, 1809.
- Alphabetic Key to the Propria quæ maribus, 1812.
- Introduction to English Composition and Elocution, 1817.
- Clavis Metrico-Virgiliana, 1818.
- Eton Latin Prosody illustrated, 1818.
- Greek Terminations, 1821.
- Latin Terminations, 1821. He published also a small volume of poems, with a portrait prefixed.

== Notes ==
Attribution

This article incorporates text from a publication now in the public domain: Stephen, Leslie, ed. (1887). "Carey, John (1756-1826)". Dictionary of National Biography. Vol. 9. London: Smith, Elder & Co.
