= George Carew =

George Carew may refer to:

- George Carew (admiral) (c. 1504–1545) soldier and adventurer, died in the sinking of the Tudor warship the Mary Rose
- George Carew (priest) (1497/8–1583), English Anglican Dean of Christ Church, Dean of Windsor and Dean of Exeter
- George Carew (diplomat) (died c. 1613), English diplomat and historian
- George Carew, 1st Earl of Totnes (1555–1629), Baron Carew of Clopton, served under Elizabeth I and was appointed President of Munster, son of the Dean of Exeter
- George Carew, 4th Baron Carew (1863–1926), younger son of Robert Shapland Carew
- George Carew (cricketer) (1910–1974), West Indies cricketer
