= William Paulet Carey =

Irish art critic and publicist

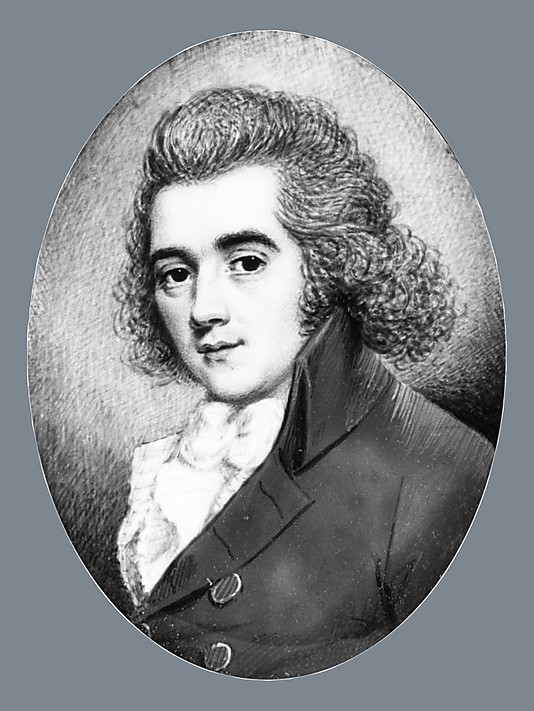
William Paulet Carey, miniature portrait

William Paulet Carey (1759 – 21 May 1839) was an Irish art critic and publicist, known also as an engraver and dealer. In 1792 he joined the Society of United Irishmen in Dublin, but feeling unsupported as he himself faced charges of sedition, in 1794 he testified in the government case against the United Irishman William Drennan. In England, he spent half a century promoting British art, most of his writings being distributed gratuitously.

== Early life ==
Carey was born into an Irish Catholic family in Dublin, the brother of John Carey and Mathew Carey. His father Christopher Carey was a baker and newspaper owner. Of two other brothers, James became a newspaper editor in Philadelphia.

Carey studied drawing at the Royal Dublin Society's school. He began life as a painter and then became an engraver. After an accident to his eyes he had to abandon his career in art. He edited in Dublin the Sentimental and Masonic Magazine (1792–95).

== Disaffected United Irishman ==
Stirred by news of revolution and reform in France and dissatisfied with the moderation of the established Catholic Committee, in October 1791, with some forty like-minded radicals, Carey helped form the Catholic Society with Theobald McKenna as their secretary. They published the Declaration of the Catholic Society of Dublin to promote unanimity among Irishmen and remove religious prejudices, written by McKenna, demanding total repeal of the penal laws as a matter of right. The declaration caused a split in the Catholic Committee. Led by Lord Kenmare, The more conservative and clerical members publicly withdrew.

Although a clash with McKenna made his first application to join the United Irishmen problematic, he joined their Dublin Society in the new year, committing himself to an alliance with northern Presbyterians to secure full and immediate Catholic emancipation and parliamentary reform. With his brother James, Carey began to publish Rights of Irishman, or National Evening Star, a paper that ran to 1795 carrying the United Irish message of a democratic union of "Catholic, Protestant and Dissenter". In 1792, he printed William Drennan's Address to the Volunteers which urged defiance of the law banning the Volunteer militia movement and its political conventions. In 1793 he also published W. Todd Jones's Reply to an anonymous writer from Belfast, in which Jones, MP for Lisburn (1783–1790), defended his uncompromising advocacy of emancipation and reform.

Carey did not fit easily into the Dublin Society. He was unusual in the United Irishmen, for example, in that he took the side of the journeymen in the contemporary labour agitation. Politically, he was aligned with James Napper Tandy and John Binns.

In November 1792 Carey reprinted from the United Irishmen's Northern Star, published in Belfast, a paragraph on local rejoicing at the outcome of the Battle of Valmy, and Arthur Wolfe warned him of a prosecution for seditious libel. The printing of Drennan's Address in December caused Carey further trouble with the Dublin administration. His creditors called in their debts, he sold the Star to Randal McAllister, and went into hiding. An attempt to get help from the United Irishmen led to his arrest and release on bail in March 1793. With a wife and a family he could not easily flee the country.

Expecting more support from the Society than he received, Carey complained in a letter sent under a pseudonym to and was expelled from the Society in November 1793. This move followed exhaustive attempts by Carey to have the Society stand bail for him (so that he could leave without requiring his friends to pay the surety). Durey argues that Carey accurately analysed the use of the existing funds, to support leaders of higher social rank than he had.

A government agent working undercover in the Society convinced William to testify against Drennan with a generous offer of compensation. In 1794 he was the chief witness in the treason trial of Drennan. On that occasion, he identified himself as a United Irishman, and may well have felt that in testifying to Drennan's authorship he was not entirely betraying his own democratic ideals. Michael Durey suggests that Carey was hostile to elite leadership in the Dublin Society whether it was from Catholic Committee members or from the "Inner Society", "Protestant but National", that Drennan had formed as a hedge against a Catholic sell-out of political reform in favour of emancipation alone. Carey was furiously cross-examined by John Philpot Curran, but according to Durey, Carey had done nothing to embroider the truth. Drennan was nonetheless acquitted.

== Aftermath of the Drennan trial ==
Having published his side of the story in late 1794, Carey spent some time in Philadelphia in 1795, and then came back to Dublin to run a government-subsidised paper, the General Evening Post (later the Volunteer Packet). Its sale dwindled, according to Francis Higgins, to under 20 copies, and intimidation was used against those selling it or buying space for advertisements. Carey took part in the yeomanry volunteer force, and there ran into trouble, thought to be inciting the lower ranks against the officers. During the Irish Rebellion of 1798 he left Ireland in June, for self-preservation, returning later.

== In England ==
Carey left Dublin for England permanently, around the middle of 1799. A dealer in pictures, prints, and other works of art, he was one of the main agents used by John Leicester, 5th Baronet in the formation of his collection. For some years he had an establishment in Marylebone Street, London. He became chief art critic to the Literary Gazette.

Carey saluted the talent of Francis Chantrey the sculptor in the Sheffield Iris, in 1805. At the end of 1816 he praised the graphical work of William Blake, then little known, and wondered aloud what posterity would make of his lack of patrons; the significant unsigned obituary of Blake in the Literary Gazette in 1827 is tentatively assigned to Carey. He praised Washington Allston and his work Uriel Standing in the Sun to the Pennsylvania Academy of the Fine Arts in 1818.

Carey brought James Montgomery the poet into prominence. After a visit to Cork in 1824, he wrote letters in the Cork and Dublin papers to promote the work of John Hogan the sculptor. Hogan was then able to visit Italy, to study art.

== Last years ==
Carey settled in Birmingham in about 1834. He spent time in Philadelphia, about 1836 to 1838, when he spoke there on National and Commercial Utility and Profit of the Arts of Design. He sold items from his collection, one of the purchasers being John Neagle.

Carey died in Birmingham on 21 May 1839, aged 80.

== Works ==
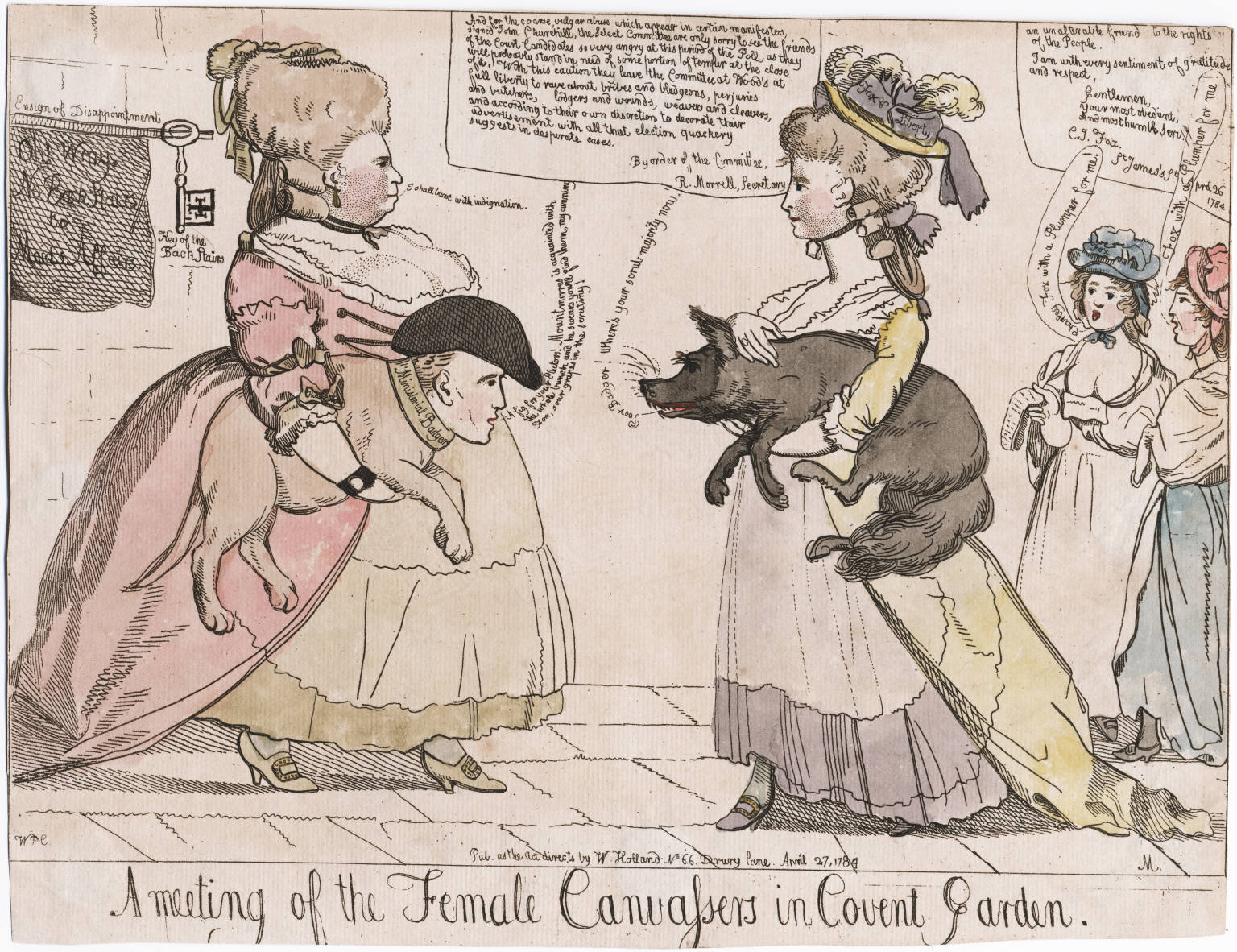
A meeting of the female canvassers in Covent Garden, satirical print from 1784 by William Paulet Carey

Carey produced some satirical and political engravings for the 1784 British general election, working with William Holland of Drury Lane. In 1787 he turned to Ireland and the matter of religion, Arthur O'Leary and William Campbell, who had joined sides in controversy with Richard Woodward. In 1789 he collected his political verse in The Nettle, aimed at the Marquess of Buckingham, and published it under the pseudonym "Scriblerus Murtough O'Pindar" He did the copperplates in Geoffrey Gambado's (Henry William Bunbury's) Annals of Horsemanship (Dublin, 1792). He also made several plates for a collection of ethical maxims, the Morals of Horace translated by Elizabeth Grattan in Dublin in 1785.

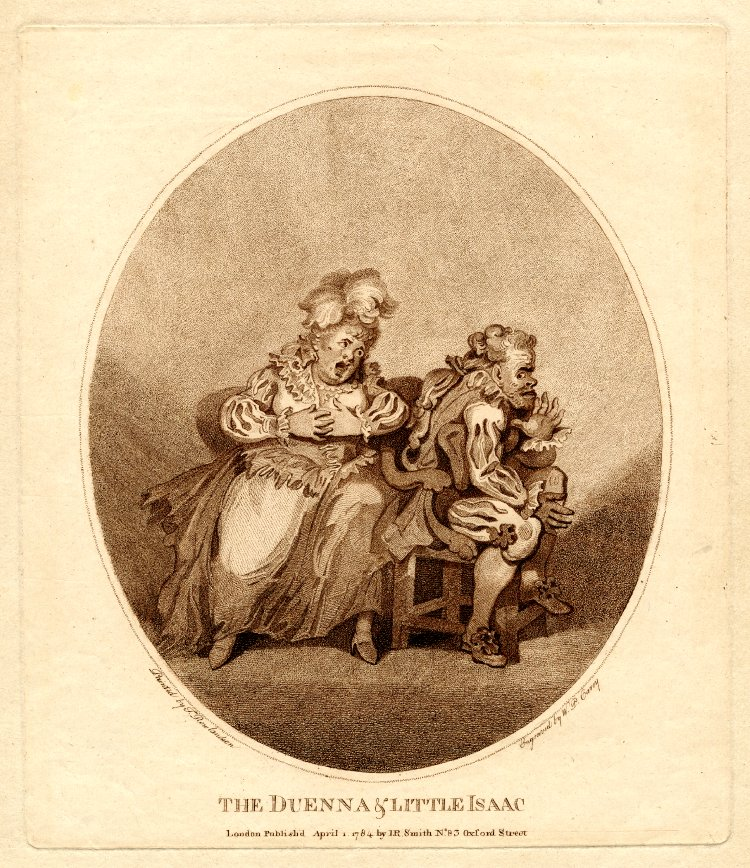
Engraving of 1784 of a scene from The Duenna by William Paulet Carey, with Jane Green and John Quick

In 1806 Carey wrote a pamphlet in defence of the Princess of Wales; in 1820 he published two other pamphlets, The Conspiracies of 1806 and 1813 against the Princess of Wales linked with the atrocious conspiracies of 1820 against the Queen of England, and The Present Plot showed by the Past. In 1834 he contributed to The Analyst, a Birmingham quarterly journal. He wrote also:

- Thoughts on the best mode of checking the Prejudices against British Works of Art, York, 1801.
- A Critical Description of the Procession of Chaucer's Pilgrims to Canterbury, painted by Stothard, Lond. 1808; second edition 1818. Carey stayed in Liverpool in 1808 with William Roscoe, producing this critical work on Thomas Stothard's Chaucer illustration, and meeting Robert Cromek through Roscoe. The book was dedicated to John Leigh Philips. It is reprinted, with annotations by Maria McGarrity, as Appendix 2 in Chaucer Illustrated (2003).
- Letter to J. A., a Connoisseur in London, Manchester, 1809; to Colonel Anderdon.
- Cursory Thoughts on the Present State of the Fine Arts, Liverpool, 1810.
- Recommendation of the Stained Glass Window of the Transfiguration for St. James's Church, Westminster, 1815.
- Memoirs of Bartolozzi, in the European Magazine, vols. lxvii. and lxviii. 1815. This ran through six numbers, but was left unfinished.
- Critical Description and Analytical Reviews of Death upon the Pale Horse, painting by Benjamin West, 1817. An edition was published at Philadelphia in 1836.
- A Descriptive Catalogue of a Collection of Paintings by British Artists in the possession at Sir John Fleming Leicester, 1819.

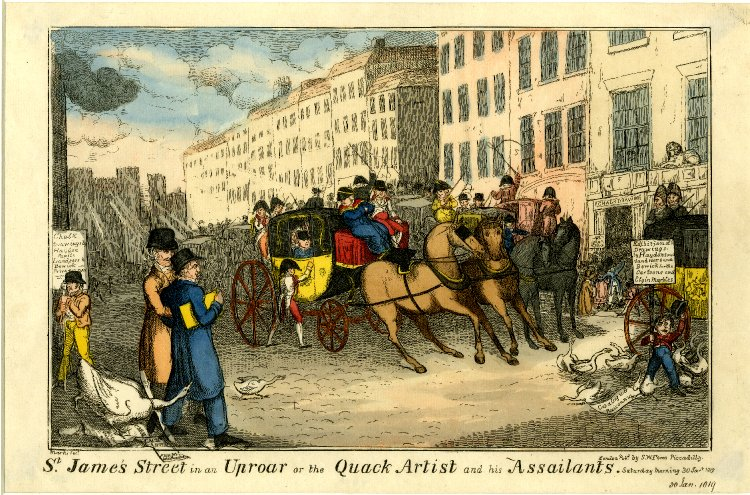
Satirical print of an early incident in the feud between Carey and Benjamin Haydon. St James' Street in an Uproar or the Quack Artist and his Assailants: Saturday morning 30 Jan 1819. Haydon is at the left in blue, Carey is represented by the goose behind him. Carey had doubted whether Haydon's charging a shilling for admission to an exhibition of eight chalk drawings was value for money.

- Desultory Exposition of an Anti-British System of Incendiary Publication, 1819. This was an attack on Benjamin Haydon and James Elmes: Haydon had used Annals of the Fine Arts, edited by Elmes, to accuse Carey of writing in a complimentary fashion about Benjamin West for pay.
- Addenda to H. Reveley's Notices illustrative of the Masters, 1820.
- Memoirs of B. West, R.A., in Colburn's New Monthly Magazine, 1820.
- Variæ: Historical Observations on Anti-British and Anti-Contemporanian Prejudices, 1822. Here Carey continued his attacks on Haydon.
- Patronage of Irish Genius, Dublin, 1823.
- Critical Catalogue of the Verville Collection, 1823.
- The National Obstacle to the National Public Style considered, 1825. Subtitle Observations on the probable decline or extinction of British historical painting, from the effects of the Church exclusion of paintings.
- Some Memoirs of the Patronage and Progress of the Fine Arts in England . . . with Anecdotes of Lord De Tabley, 1820.
- Syllabus of a Course of Six Historical Lectures on the Arts of Design, Glasgow, 1828.
- Appeal to the Directors of the Royal Irish Institution, Dublin, 1828.
- Observations on the Primary Object of the British Institution for the Promotion of the Fine Arts, Newcastle, 1829.
- Brief Remarks on the Anti-British Effect of Inconsiderate Criticism on Modern Art and the Exhibitions of the Living British Artists, London, 1831.
- Ridolfi's Critical Letters, Leeds, 1831.
- Ridolfi's Critical Letters on the Style of William Etty, Nottingham, 1838. From the Yorkshire Gazette.
- Lorenzo's Critical Letters on the First Exhibition of the Worcester Institution, second series. Worcester, 1834. A third series was issued in the following year. The Letters were published in the Worcester Herald. John Constable commented on the 1835 series, that they were a "parcel of sad stuff".
- Syllabus of various Lectures on the Fine Arts.

An unfinished work was a Life of John Boydell.

== Family ==
Carey's first wife Dorothy died in 1791, shortly after his eldest son. He married again in 1792, to a Miss Lennon. One of his daughters, Elizabeth Sheridan Carey, wrote a volume of poems called Ivy Leaves, privately printed in 1837.

== Notes ==
Attribution

This article incorporates text from a publication now in the public domain: Stephen, Leslie, ed. (1887). "Carey, William Paulet". Dictionary of National Biography. Vol. 9. London: Smith, Elder & Co.
