= Jack and Jill (dance) =

Format of competition in partner dancing

Jack and Jill is a format of competition in partner dancing, where the competing couples are the result of random matching of leaders and followers. Rules of matching vary.

The name and format were created by Jack Carey at Hank & Stans in Norwalk, California in the early 1950s to encourage a variety of dancers to enter competitions.

The gender-ambiguous term Pat and Chris has been used, particularly in LGBT dance venues, to refer to events where the gender of lead and follow isn't specified. In the swing dance community, the name mix and match is now used as a gender-neutral, more inclusive name.

In dance competitions J&J is included as a separate division (or divisions, with additional gradations). J&J is popular at Swing conventions, as well as at ballroom dance competitions in the US.

J&J competitions are intended to test social dance skills, whereas fixed partner "showcase" competitions test performance dance skills.

== Rules ==
Rules vary, depending on country and dance style.

In the UK, it is normal to randomly assign fixed couples, and then keep those couples fixed throughout the competition (for example, if there are multiple rounds). Thus, the winner is largely decided by luck of the draw, with the winning couple often being regular dance partners who were lucky enough to be paired together. As a result, DWAS (Dance With A Stranger) competitions are not taken as seriously as fixed partner competitions.

In the US, Jack & Jill contests are extremely popular in the national West Coast Swing and Lindy Hop communities. Rules vary in events across the country but three rules seem to be standard in most Jack & Jill contests: 1) no pre-arranged choreography is allowed (which would generally be impractical anyway, as partners are assigned randomly), 2) no costumes are allowed, and 3) acrobatic elements such as lifts are not allowed, or only allowed when deemed safe by the judges. However, at the Champion or Invitational level, event organizers will occasionally opt for an "anything goes" Jack & Jill in which no rules apply. Music for each dance is selected at random without the participants' prior knowledge, though some competitions will allow them to select the tempo (speed) or a sub-style within their dance's music (e.g. Blues or contemporary within West Coast Swing).

Although it is not the case in every Jack & Jill contest, it is somewhat typical for dancers to be judged individually, then dancers who make any elimination rounds redraw for new partners. Depending on rules specific to the event/competition, a Jack & Jill competitor may or may not be allowed to dance with their regular competition partner (one that they compete with in a choreographed division). At some events/competitions they are required to redraw; and some events that don't have the redraw rule give dancers the option to decline if they draw their regular competition partner but do not require them to do so. Some dancers who draw their regular [choreographed division] partner see this "luck" as more of a competition handicap, feeling that the crowd and possibly the judges will more closely scrutinize them, expecting even more of their competition performance than competitors who do not draw their regular partners.

One of the key elements of a Jack & Jill contest in the US West Coast Swing and Lindy Hop communities is the element of improvisation, which is why choreography is not allowed. This improv-based feature can prove to be extremely entertaining as dancers try to coordinate dancing with this new partner while dancing to the specific characteristics of a random song or "expressing musicality". Since the spirit of improvisation can possibly be dampened by the dancers having drawn their partner, it is often more difficult for the dancers to perform to the expectations of the spectators and the judges. Some dancers, however, are able to perform at or above the expectations depending on various factors, usually unpredictable factors such as the song, the consistency of the dance floor, or even just the simple factor of how they feel at that particular time. This can be compared to the American football adage "(on) Any Given Sunday".

== Sources ==
- Sfetcu, N. (2014). Dance Music. Nicolae Sfetcu.
