= Tanith Carey =

Tanith Carey is a British journalist, author of ten books, and "child-behaviour guru". She is a former US correspondent for the Daily Mirror and a former London Press Club Consumer Journalist of the Year.

Her work covers the topics of parenting, childhood, teenagers, child psychology, veganism, social trends, health, relationships, and psychosexual development. Tanith is a regular on UK radio - particularly BBC Radio's Woman's Hour.

She is an outspoken vegan and has appeared on panels and in debates discussing journalism and social politics around veganism.

== Books ==
As a parenting writer, Carey was author of the first book in the UK looking at how parents can address the sexualisation of children, Where Has My Little Girl Gone? How to Protect Your Daughter from Growing Up Too Soon. It was published in May 2011. It has since been translated in twelve languages.

Her book Taming the Tiger Mother: How to Put the Well-Being of your Child First in a Competitive World was published by Constable/Little Brown in September 2014. Girls Uninterrupted: Steps for Building Stronger Girls in a Challenging World was published by Icon Books in March 2015.

- What's My Teenager Thinking? Practical Child Psychology for Modern Parents (2020)
- What's My Child Thinking? Practical Child Psychology for Modern Parents (2019)
- The Friendship Maze: How to Help Your Child To Navigate Their Way To Positive and Happier Friendships (2019)
- Mum Hacks: Time-Saving Tips To Calm The Chaos of Family Life (2016)
- Girls, Interrupted: Steps For Building Stronger Girls In A Challenging World (2015)
- Never Kiss A Man In A Canoe: Words of Wisdom From the Golden Age of Agony Aunts (2015)
- Taming The Tiger Parent: How To Put You Child's Well-Being First in a Competitive World (2014)
- Where Has My Little Girl Gone? How to Protect Your Daughter from Growing Up Too Soon (2011)
- A Mother's Love: Stories of Fun, Forgiveness, Hope and Joy Hardcover (2010)
- How To Be An Amazing Mum When You Just Don't Have the Time: The Ultimate Handbook for Hassled Mothers (2009)
