= Leeanne Carey =

Australian occupational therapist and neuroscientist

Professor Leeanne Carey
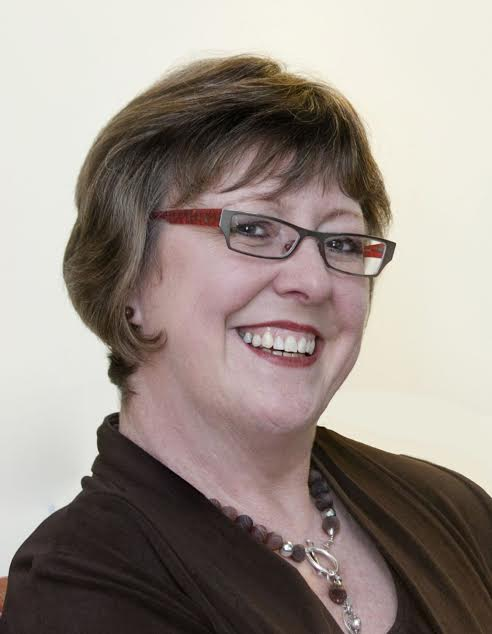
- Born: 29 October 1959 (age 66); Melbourne, Australia
- Citizenship: Australian
- Education: Lincoln Institute of Health Sciences La Trobe University
- Known for: Occupational therapy; Rehabilitation and recovery from stroke
- Scientific career
- Workplaces: Florey Institute of Neuroscience and Mental Health La Trobe University

Leeanne Carey is an Australian neuroscientist in occupational therapy and stroke rehabilitation and recovery research. She is the founding leader of the Neurorehabilitation and Recovery research group in the Stroke division at the Florey Institute of Neuroscience and Mental Health in Melbourne, Australia. She holds a Future Fellowship awarded by the Australian Research Council (ARC).

== Early life and education ==
Leeanne Mary Carey graduated high school from Chavoin College in Melbourne in 1977, where she was awarded Dux of School and Special Distinction in the Higher School Certificate English exam.

Carey began her tertiary education at the Lincoln Institute of Health Sciences, where she graduated with a Bachelor of Applied Sciences in Occupational Therapy (BAppSc(OT)) in 1987. In 1993, Carey became the first person in Australia to complete a Doctor of Philosophy (PhD) in Occupational Therapy through La Trobe University. Her PhD thesis investigated training effects and quantitative measurement of tactile and proprioceptive discrimination loss after stroke, which was successfully passed without revision.

== Career ==
=== 1981-1990 ===
Prior to beginning her full-time PhD candidature in 1990, Carey worked as a Grade 1 Occupational Therapist at the Manvantara Geriatric Rehabilitation Hospital between 1981 and 1983.

Between 1983 and 1989, she was appointed as a Senior Tutor for undergraduate classes in the School of Occupational Therapy at the Lincoln Institute of Health Sciences. In 1987, Carey was promoted to a Lecturer position in the Lincoln School of Health Sciences at La Trobe University shortly after the two institutes had merged. In 1989, Carey was appointed Chief Occupational Therapist at the Hampton Rehabilitation Hospital where she worked for one year.

=== 1993-2014 ===
For the next two decades following the completion of her PhD, Carey progressed from multiple post-doctoral fellowships to founding a research laboratory in Neurorehabilitation and Recovery Research in the Stroke Division at the National Stroke Research Institute in 2004. The research lab was transferred to the Florey Institute of Neuroscience and Mental Health. She was awarded Research Fellowships from several institutions including the Australian Research Council, National Stroke Research Institute, Brain Research Institute, and the Australian National Health and Medical Research Council (NHMRC).

In 2004, Carey was appointed Adjunct Professor for the Department of Occupational Therapy at La Trobe University and in 2013 became a member of the Faculty of Health Sciences Research Committee of the university. In 2010 she was appointed to the Faculty of the Florey Institute. In 2013 she was elected to the Australian Academy of Science and elected Chair of the Inaugural Australian Occupational Therapy Research Foundation.

As of November 2014, Carey's Neurorehabilitation and Recovery research lab has grown to a team of 24 researchers, including 1 post-doc, 6 research staff, 10 affiliates, and 7 students from disciplines ranging from occupational therapy, physiotherapy, neurology, psychology and neuroscience.

=== Research focus ===
Carey's primary focus encompasses four main areas of research: 1) Investigating restorative approaches to stroke rehabilitation; 2) Understanding the nature of sensorimotor impairment and impact on function; 3) Targeting of rehabilitation through novel brain imaging and biomarkers; and 4) Studying the impact of depression and cognition on stroke recovery and participation.

Her approaches to stroke rehabilitation are primarily based on theories of neural plasticity and learning and empirically tested for clinical and neuroanatomical outcomes. The research lab utilises Magnetic Resonance Imaging (MRI) tools to study dynamic changes in the brain in order to better understand mechanisms of recovery and optimise rehabilitation methods to survivors of stroke. A recent focus of her research has been the impact of cognition and depression on stroke recovery and utilising novel brain imaging tools and biomarkers for optimal targeting of rehabilitation post-stroke.

Carey received research funding from competitive grants schemes totalling over $8.8 million AUD.

=== Publications ===
Carey's research is published in numerous peer reviewed journals. In 2012 she was invited to edit the book 'Stroke Rehabilitation: Insights from Neuroscience and Imaging'. Her publications are listed on Google Scholar and SciProfiles. At September 2026 there are 114 articles noted on Google Scholar and thirteen book chapters on SciProfiles.

She gave the Sylvia Docker Lecture in 2023. The lectureship is named after Sylvia Docker, who established the first training school for occupational therapists in Sydney in 1941. It also marks the start of the marks the Australian Association of Occupational Therapists in December 1945.

== Personal ==
She is married with two children and resides in Melbourne, Australia.

== Awards and honors ==
- 2013: World Federation of Neurological Rehabilitation Franz Gerstenbrand Award (nomination under review).
- 2013: Nominated, Victoria prize for science and innovation
- 2013: Chair, inaugural Occupational Therapy Australia Research Foundation.
- 2013: International Visiting Professor, University of Haifa, Israel.
- 2011: International Visiting Professor, Washington University School of Medicine, St. Louis, USA.
- 2010: Honored by the World Federation for Neurorehabilitation (WFNR). (Neurorehabil Neural Repair, 2010;24:499-500).
- 2010: BrainLink Women of Achievement Award (finalist).
- 2009: Inducted to the Academy of Research of the American Occupational Therapy Foundation for ‘exemplary and distinguished contributions towards the science of occupational Therapy.
- 2009: Australian Research Council (ARC) Future Fellowship
- 2004-2008: National Health and Medical Research Council (NHMRC) of Australia Career Development Award.
- 1995: La Trobe University, Faculty of Health Sciences Postdoctoral Research Fellowship.
- 1994: La Trobe University, Faculty of Health Sciences Research Grant for post-doctoral studies.
- 1991: Australian Association of Occupational Therapists Research Award
- 1990: Australian Postgraduate Research Award.
- 1988: World Federation of Occupational Therapists Foundation Research Award (only one award is awarded worldwide every four years).
- 1988: La Trobe University Postgraduate Scholarship.
- 1981: Special commendation for grades obtained in final year of study, School of Occupational Therapy, La Trobe University.
- 1977: Dux of School, Chavoin College, Melbourne, Australia. Special Distinction, Higher School Certificate English exam.
