= Alan C. Carey =

American military historian, novelist and journalist

- Born: Orange County, California, U.S.
- Occupations: Author, historian
- Writing career
- Period: 1999-present
- Genre: Military History
- Notable works: We Flew Alone, 2nd Ed. Twin Mustang: The North American F-82 at War

Alan C. Carey is an American author and historian who specializes in military aviation topics.

== Biography ==
Carey was born in Orange County, California, to Robert Watson Carey (1926–2004) and Joyce Kathleen Haynes (1928–1991). He holds dual citizenship with the United States and Great Britain. Carey is a graduate of Southwest Texas State University (now Texas State University) with a master's degree in public administration and a bachelor's degree in history and political science.

== Early life ==
Carey was born while his father was stationed at Marine Corps Air Station El Toro. His father served as an aviation radioman, air gunner, and navigator serving from World War II to the Vietnam War. Carey's childhood as a military dependent consisted of living in three states and three foreign countries before the age of five. His father's retirement and subsequent second career in the construction industry resulted in the family moving to several more states before settling in Texas in 1975. His writing career began as an intern with the Texas State Historical Commission in 1992 where he co-authored Historic Preservation Easements in Texas.

== Military service ==
Like his father, a veteran of the Navy and Marine Corps, Carey enlisted in the military serving in the U.S. Marine Corps as a machine gunner/team leader and in the U.S. Army Reserve as a nuclear, biological, and chemical defense specialist and weapons instructor.

== Career ==
Carey's early interest in military aviation history stems from his father's career as an aviation radioman and air gunner with Navy Bombing Squadron 109 (VB-109) and reading the works of such military historians as Edwin P. Hoyt, Steve Birdsall, Barrett Tillman, and Samuel Eliot Morison.

In 1995, after researching VB-109's history, he was able to obtain the Distinguished Flying Cross and several additional Air Medals to his father's surviving crew members with the help of Congressman Lamar Smith (R). He is also noted for aiding veterans and families in a variety of issues related to military service. He began writing his first book, The Reluctant Raiders, after conducting research regarding his father's military service. Carey's early works traced relatively unknown aspects of military aviation primarily related to the Navy's use of the Consolidated B-24 Liberator and North American B-25 Mitchell.

== Published works ==
- The Reluctant Raiders (1999) ISBN 0-7643-0757-6
- We Flew Alone (2000) ISBN 0-7643-1170-0
- Above an Angry Sea (2001) ISBN 0-7643-1286-3
- Leatherneck Bombers: Marine Corps B-25/PBJ Mitchell Squadrons in World War II (2002) ISBN 0-764-31501-3 OCLC 50951647
- PV Ventura and Harpoon Units of WWII (Osprey, 2002) ISBN 1-841-76383-7 OCLC 49784977
- U.S. Navy PB4Y-1 (B-24) Squadrons in Great Britain (2003) ISBN 0-7643-1775-X
- Galloping Ghosts of the Brazilian Coast (2004)
- Consolidated-Vultee PB4Y-2 Privateer (2005) ISBN 0-7643-2166-8
- The Douglas F3D Skyknight (2012) ISBN 0-89747-685-9
- Twin Mustang: The North American F-82 at War (2014) ISBN 978-1783462216
- Night Cats and Corsairs: The Operational History of Grumman and Vought Night Fighter Aircraft (1943-1953) (2014) ISBN 978-0764343735
- Lockheed F-94 Starfire (2015) ISBN 978-0989258395
- Above an Angry Sea: Men and Missions of the United States Navy's PB4Y-1 Liberator and PB4Y-2 Privateer Squadrons Pacific Theater: October 1944–September 1945 2nd Edition (2017) ISBN 0764353683
- We Flew Alone: Men and Missions of the United States Navy's B-24 Liberator Squadrons Pacific Operations: February 1943–September 1944 2nd Edition (2017) ISBN 0764353691
- Sighted Sub, Sank Same: The United States Navy's Air Campaign Against the U-boat (2020) ISBN 978-1612007830
- United States Naval Antisubmarine Operations In The South Atlantic During World War II (2022) ISBN 979-8352386330
- Chasing Hitler's Gold (2022) ISBN 979-8848808391
- Contact!: Early U.S. Naval and Marine Corps Aviation, 1911-1918 (2023) ISBN 1802826475

Co-author non-fiction work

- Guerra, Vicky and Alan Carey. Historic Preservation Easements in Texas Texas Historical Commission, National Register Programs, Certified Local Government Program (1992)

Chapters in a non-fiction work

- J.K. Kelley, ed., Westside Publishing, ed. Armchair Reader World War II (2007)
- Polmar, Norman, et al. Voyageur Press. Spyplanes: The Illustrated Guide to Manned Reconnaissance and Surveillance Aircraft from World War I to Today" (2016) ISBN 978-0760350317

== Television appearances ==
Dogfights: Season 2, episode 17. Secret Weapons (3/14/08): Secret weapons of World War II: Appeared in the segment on American remote controlled airplanes of Operation Aphrodite.

Hunters In the Sky (2002): Appeared in infomercial for the documentary series on World War II aviation.
