= George Carey (footballer) =

Australian rules footballer

Personal information
- Full name: George Carey
- Born: 8 July 1943
- Original team: Mordialloc
- Height: 183 cm (6 ft 0 in)
- Weight: 83 kg (183 lb)

Playing career^{1}
Years	Club	Games (Goals)
1966	Fitzroy	5 (4)
- ^{1} Playing statistics correct to the end of 1966.

George Carey (born 8 July 1943) is a former Australian rules footballer who played with Fitzroy in the Victorian Football League (VFL) He is the father of Stefan Carey who played with Sydney and Brisbane between 1994 and 2000.
