= Carbury (County Kildare barony) =

Carbury Cairbre (Irish)
- Barony
- Interactive map of Carbury
- Sovereign state: Ireland
- County: Kildare

Area
  - Total: 195.41 km^{2} (75.45 sq mi)

Carbury (Irish: Cairbre) is a barony in County Kildare, Ireland.

== Etymology ==
Carbury derives its name from the village of Carbury, which in turn is named for the Cairbre Uí Chiardha.

== Location ==
Carbury barony is found in northwest County Kildare, enclosed by the River Boyne, Enfield Blackwater and Bog of Allen.

== History ==
Ó Ciardha (O'Keary or O'Carey, O'Carry. ), lords of Carbury about the time of the Norman invasions, were of the Southern Uí Néill group. It is believed they were a recent 12th century intrusion following Breifne pressure on their original territory in north-east Longford around Granard.

The Carbury area is dominated by the ruins of the great Tudor mansion of Carbury Castle set atop Carbury Hill, which was also known as Fairy Hill. The motte on the hill was probably built by Meiler FitzHenry who was granted the area by Strongbow in 1174. It was acquired by the de Berminghams in the 14th century. Their chief local rivals were the O'Connors of Offaly whom they massacred under the cloak of hospitality on a number of occasions in the 14th century including a dinner on Trinity Sunday, A.D. 1315, by Sir Pierce MacFeorais (Peter Bermingham) at Carbury Castle. The Berminghams also conducted private wars against their neighbours in the Pale culminating in their imprisonment of the Crown's representatives, including Thomas de Burley Chancellor of Ireland, after a failed parley in 1368 at Carbury Hill. Carbury was taken by the native Irish in the 15th century while titular ownership lay with the Prestons of Gormanston after Robert Preston, first Baron Gormanston married Margaret, daughter and heiress of Walter de Bermingham. In 1466 the Earl of Desmond serving as Lord Deputy of Ireland was defeated by his own brother-in-law O'Conor of Offaly, who took him prisoner and confined him in Carbury castle. He was rescued within a few days by the people of Dublin, but his defeat permanently weakened the defence of the Pale. In 1588 Carbury Castle was granted to the Colley family, ancestors of the Dukes of Wellington, who built a large stronghouse in the 17th century.

== List of settlements ==
Below is a list of settlements in Carbury barony:

- Carbury
- Johnstownbridge
- Derrinturn
