= George Carey (filmmaker) =

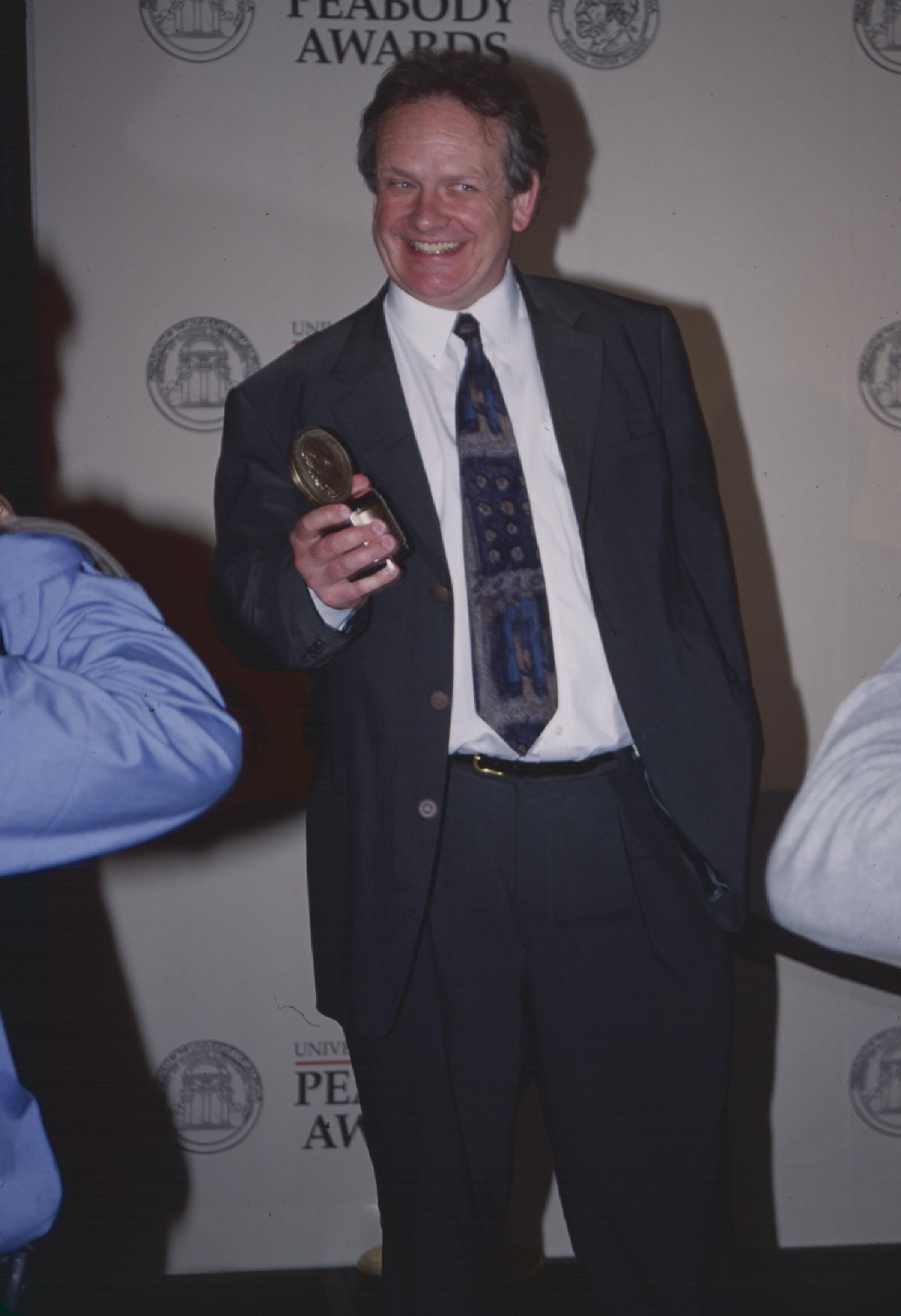
George Carey at the Peabody Awards in May 2000

George Carey (born 1943) is a British documentary filmmaker and television journalist.

== Education ==
Carey was educated at Downside School, a boarding independent school for boys in the village of Stratton-on-the-Fosse in Somerset in South West England, followed by the University of Oxford.

== Life and career ==
As a director/editor at BBC News, Carey is credited with the creation of the Newsnight current affairs programme in 1980, before going on to become Editor of BBC1’s Panorama during the Falklands War. In 1988, he left the BBC to co-found an independent production company with Jenny Barraclough. In 1997, Barraclough Carey Productions was acquired by Mentorn Films, and Carey became Creative Director of the new entity, now known as Mentorn Media. As well as producing a series of prize-winning documentaries (see below), he secured the contract to produce the BBC’s weekly political discussion programme Question Time, and originated Channel 4’s Unreported World strand. In 2005, he received a Lifetime Achievement Award from the Royal Television Society. In 2007, he returned to filmmaking himself, with a five part BBC series on Russia presented by Jonathan Dimbleby, before shooting and directing several individual documentaries with producer Teresa Cherfas. These included Close Encounters in Siberia, A Long Weekend with the Son of God – both for Channel 4 – and Knocking on Heaven’s Door, Hitler, Stalin and Mr Jones, The Spy Who Went into the Cold and Masterspy of Moscow: George Blake, all for BBC Storyville.

He served for four years as a board member for Conciliation Resources, an international non-governmental organization, and for two years as Chairman of Trustees of the House of Illustration.

== Filmography ==
=== Documentary Singles ===
- Terror in Moscow (Grierson prize)
- Babitsky's War (Amnesty International prize)
- The Valley (Prix Italia, Golden Nymph Monte Carlo)
- The Unforgiving (BAFTA)
- Hello Mr President (Peabody Award)
- Fall of Saigon
- The Killing of Kennedy
- Moonlanding
- Blood on their Hands
- Terror in the Mall

=== Documentary Series (General) ===
- Russia - A Journey with Jonathan Dimbleby
- Century Road
- Testing God (Best Religious programme)
- Soul Searching
- Redemption Song
- Queen and Country
- Do you Believe in Magic?
- Visions of Heaven and Hell (Golden Spire, San Francisco)
- The White House Tapes
- The New Jerusalem
- The Tunnel
- Clintons: A Marriage of Power (Broadcast Award)
- Rebellion
- Scare Stories
- The Crimean War
- From Beirut to Bosnia
- Planet Islam
- The Poisoned Chalice
- Mad Cows and Englishmen
- Gunpower USA
- Men in Battle

=== Documentary Series (Science) ===
- The Plague (Royal Television Society Best Series)
- Knife to the Heart
- Cancer Wars
- The Babymakers (BMI Best Medical Series)

=== BBC Documentary Singles ===
- Marilyn: Say Goodbye to the President
- M.I.A.: We'll Keep You Forever
- The Trial of Klaus Barbie
- The Search for the Missing Marcos Millions (Emmy Award)
- Masterspy of Moscow – George Blake
- Hitler, Stalin and Mr Jones

=== BBC Documentary Series ===
- An Ocean Apart
- Families at War (RTS Award)
- Comrades
- Frontiers (ACE Award)

Media offices
Preceded by Position established	Editor of Newsnight; 1980–1981	Succeeded by Ron Neil
