= Jack Carey (dancer) =

American dancer (1927–2013)

Jack Carey (January 23, 1927 – September 24, 2013) was a United States swing dancer, choreographer and judge.

In 1991 he was inducted into the Swing Dance Hall of Fame. He died in 2013.
