= Cari =

Cariana may refer to:

== People ==
- Cari people, also Kari, an indigenous tribe of the Andaman Islands
- Cari (name)
- Cari Cari, Austrian band

== Places ==
- Carì, a village in the Swiss canton of Ticino

== Organizations ==
- Cari Internet, Malaysian internet company
- Central Avian Research Institute
- China Africa Research Initiative

== Species ==
- Actinia cari, species of Sea anemone
- Navicula cari, species of Algae

== Other ==
- 7680 Cari, main belt asteroid discovered in 1996
- Cari or Aka-Cari language, spoken by the Cari people
- Cassa di Risparmio (disambiguation), list of Italian savings bank which also known as Cari-demonym

== See also ==
- Valinka (disambiguation)
- Cali (disambiguation)
- Capri (disambiguation)
- Car (disambiguation)
- Card (disambiguation)
- Care (disambiguation)
- Carib (disambiguation)
- Cari-kalamator
- Cari fottutissimi amici, Italian name of 1994 film, Dear Goddamned Friends
- CariPac
- CariAccess Communications
- Carn (disambiguation)
- Carp (disambiguation)
- Cart (disambiguation)
- Cary (disambiguation)
