= Micronesia =

Subregion of Oceania

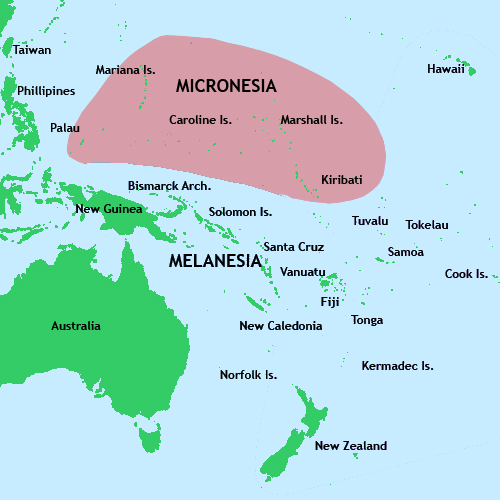
- Geographical map of Micronesia (cropped)

Population (2021)
  - Total: ▲517.464
- Demonym: Micronesian
- Countries: 5: Kiribati (partially); Nauru; Marshall Islands; Micronesia; Palau
- Dependencies: External (2): Guam (United States) Northern Mariana Islands (United States)

Subregions (Melanesia, Micronesia, Polynesia and Australasia), as well as sovereign and dependent islands of Oceania

Micronesia is one of three major cultural areas of the Pacific Ocean islands, along with Melanesia and Polynesia.

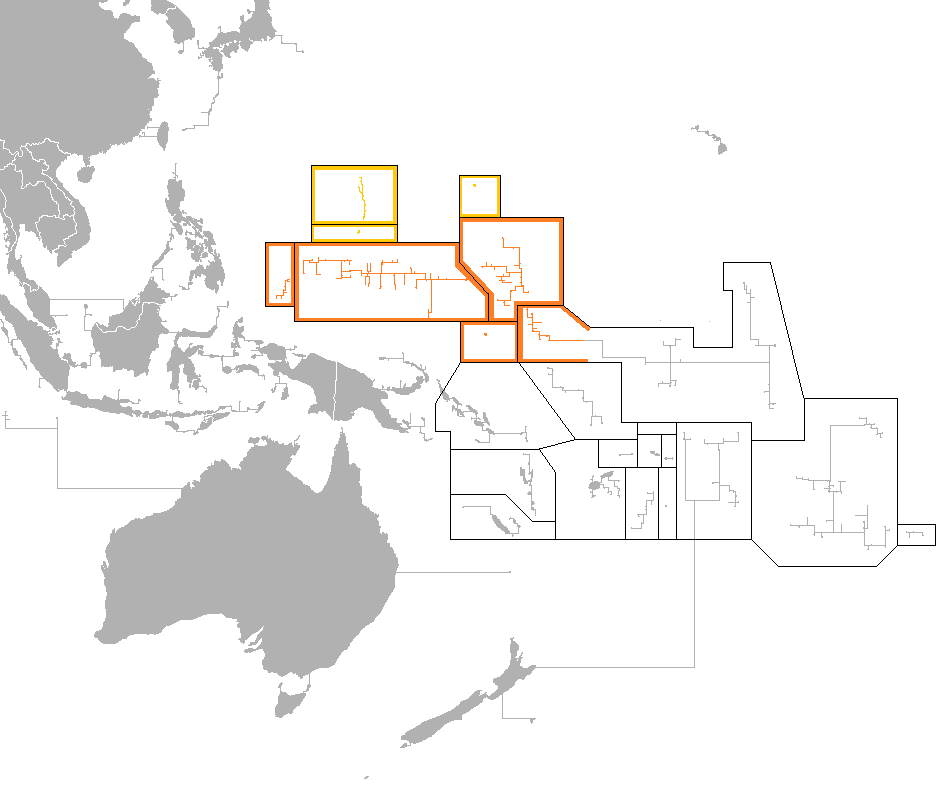
Outline of sovereign (dark orange) and dependent islands (bright orange)

Micronesia (UK: /ˌmaɪkrəˈniːziə/, US: /-ˈniːʒə/) is a subregion of Oceania, consisting of approximately 2,000 small islands in the Northwestern Pacific Ocean. It has a close shared cultural history with three other island regions: Maritime Southeast Asia to the west, Polynesia to the east, and Melanesia to the south—as well as with the wider community of Austronesian peoples.

The region has a tropical marine climate and is part of the Oceanian realm. It includes four main archipelagos—the Caroline Islands, the Gilbert Islands, the Mariana Islands, and the Marshall Islands — as well as numerous islands that are not part of any archipelago.

Political control of areas within Micronesia varies depending on the island, and is distributed among six sovereign nations. Some of the Caroline Islands are part of the Republic of Palau and some are part of the Federated States of Micronesia (often shortened to "FSM" or "Micronesia"—not to be confused with the identical name for the overall region). The Gilbert Islands (along with the Phoenix Islands and the Line Islands in Polynesia) comprise the Republic of Kiribati. The Mariana Islands are affiliated with the United States; some of them belong to the U.S. Territory of Guam and the rest belong to the U.S. Commonwealth of the Northern Mariana Islands. The island of Nauru is its own sovereign nation. The Marshall Islands all belong to the Republic of the Marshall Islands. The sovereignty of Wake Island is contested: it is claimed both by the United States and by the Republic of the Marshall Islands. The United States has actual possession of Wake Island, which is under the immediate administration of the United States Air Force.

Notwithstanding the fact that the notion of "Micronesia" has been quite well established since 1832 and has been used ever since, by most popular works, this set does not correspond to any geomorphological, archaeological, linguistic, ethnic or cultural unity, but on the contrary represents a disparate ensemble, with no real deep unity. In fact, "Micronesian people" does not exist as a subset of the sea-migrating Austronesian people, who may also include the Polynesian people and the hypothetical Australo-Melanesian or "Melanesian people".

Human settlement of Micronesia began several millennia ago. Based on the current scientific consensus, the Austronesian peoples originated from a prehistoric seaborne migration, known as the Austronesian expansion, from pre-Han Formosa, at around 3000 to 1500 BCE. Austronesians reached the northernmost Philippines, specifically the Batanes Islands, by around 2200 BCE. Austronesians were the first people to invent oceangoing sailing technologies (notably catamarans, outrigger boats, lashed-lug boat building, and the crab claw sail), which enabled their rapid dispersal into the islands of the Indo-Pacific. From 2000 BCE they assimilated (or were assimilated by) the earlier populations on the islands in their migration pathway.

The earliest known contact of Europeans with Micronesia was in 1521, when the Magellan expedition landed in the Marianas. Jules Dumont d'Urville is usually credited with coining the term "Micronesia" in 1832, but in fact, Louis Domeny de Rienzi used this term a year earlier.

== Geography ==
Micronesia is a region in Oceania that includes approximately 2100 islands, with a total land area of 2,700 km^{2} (1,000 sq mi), the largest of which is Guam, which covers 582 km^{2} (225 sq mi). The total ocean area within the perimeter of the islands is 7,400,000 km^{2} (2,900,000 sq mi).

There are four main island groups in Micronesia:

- the Caroline Islands (Federated States of Micronesia and Palau)
- the Gilbert Islands (Kiribati)
- the Mariana Islands (Northern Mariana Islands and Guam, U.S.)
- the Marshall Islands

This does not include the separate island nation of Nauru, along with other distinctly separate islands and smaller island groups.

=== Caroline Islands ===
The Caroline Islands are a widely scattered archipelago consisting of about 500 small coral islands, north of New Guinea and east of the Philippines. The Carolines consist of two nations: the Federated States of Micronesia, consisting of approximately 600 islands on the eastern side of the chain with Kosrae being the most eastern; and Palau consisting of 250 islands on the western side.

=== Gilbert Islands ===
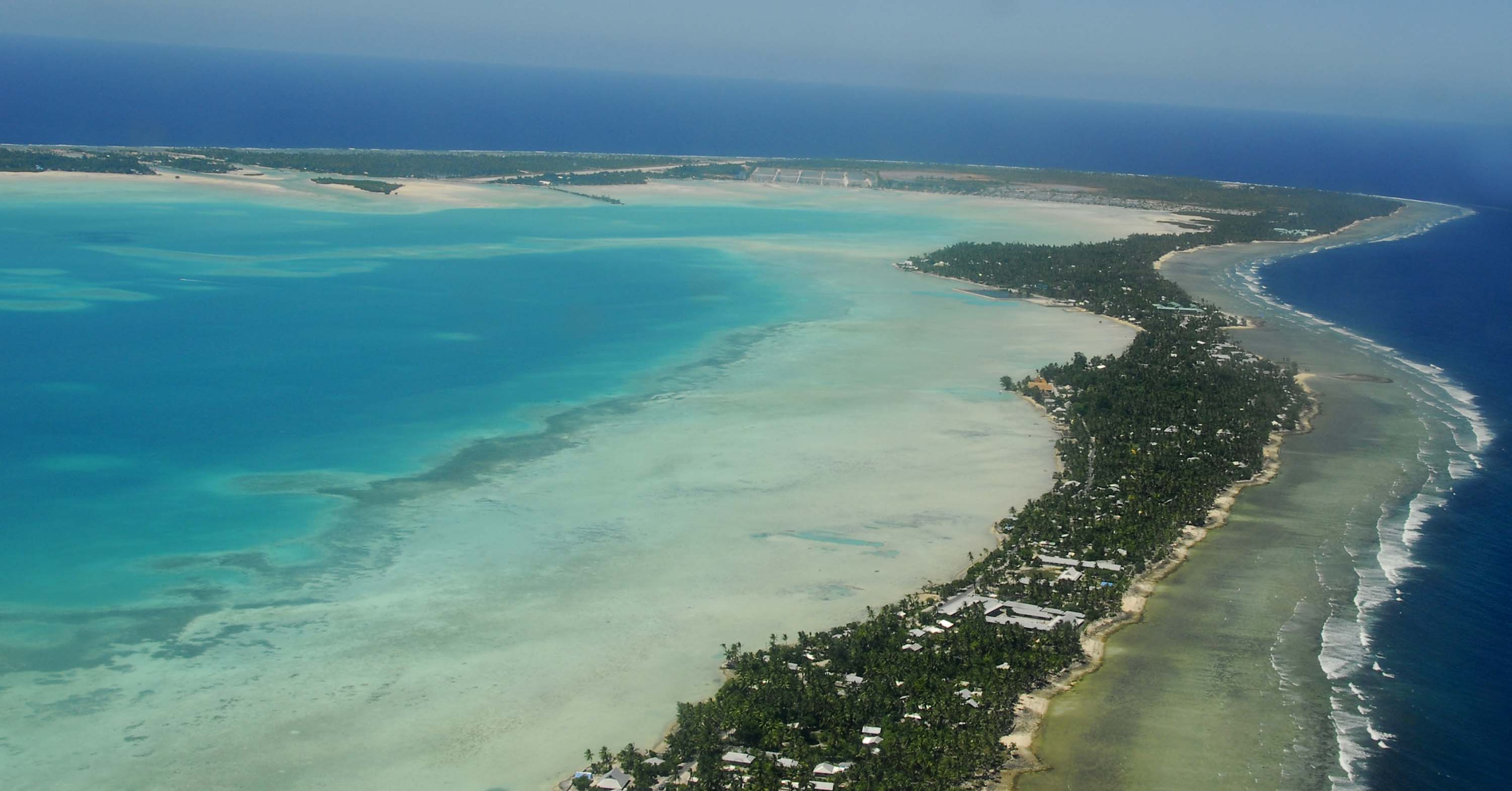
Tarawa Atoll

The Gilbert Islands are a chain of sixteen atolls and coral islands, arranged in an approximate north-to-south line. In a geographical sense, the equator serves as the dividing line between the northern Gilbert Islands and the southern Gilbert Islands. The Republic of Kiribati contains all of the Gilberts, including the island of Tarawa, the site of the country's capital.

=== Mariana Islands ===
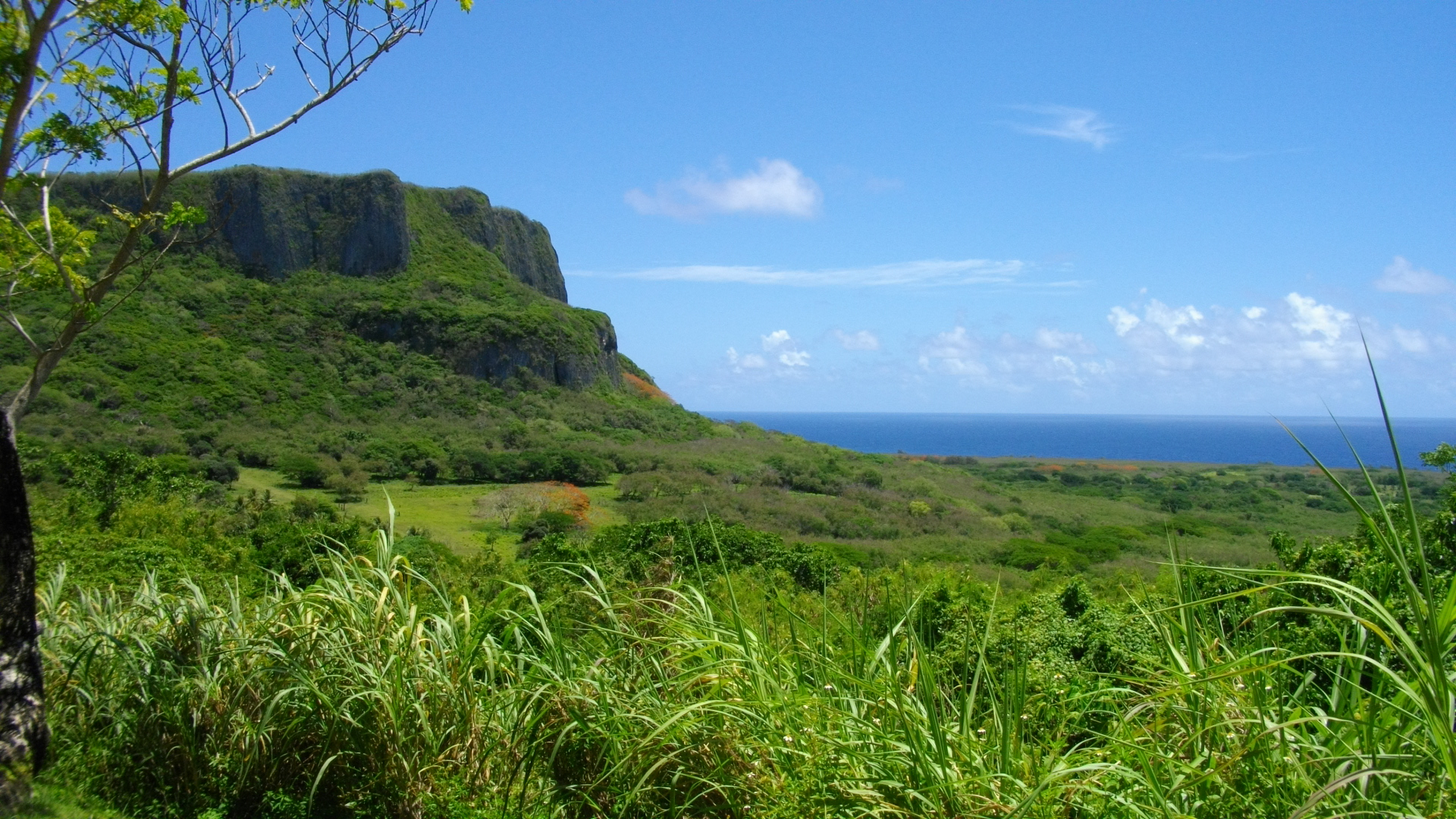
Mount Marpi in Saipan.

The Mariana Islands are an arc-shaped archipelago made up by the summits of fifteen volcanic mountains. The island chain rose as a result of the western edge of the Pacific Plate moving westward and plunging downward below the Mariana plate, a region that is the most volcanically active convergent plate boundary on Earth. The Marianas were politically divided in 1898, when the United States acquired title to Guam under the Treaty of Paris, 1898, which ended the Spanish–American War. Spain then sold the remaining northerly islands to Germany in 1899. Germany lost all of her colonies at the end of World War I and the Northern Mariana Islands became a League of Nations Mandate, with Japan as the mandatory. After World War II, the islands were transferred into the United Nations Trust Territory System, with the United States as Trustee. In 1976, the Northern Mariana Islands and the United States entered into a covenant of political union under which commonwealth status was granted the Northern Mariana Islands and its residents received United States citizenship.

=== Marshall Islands ===
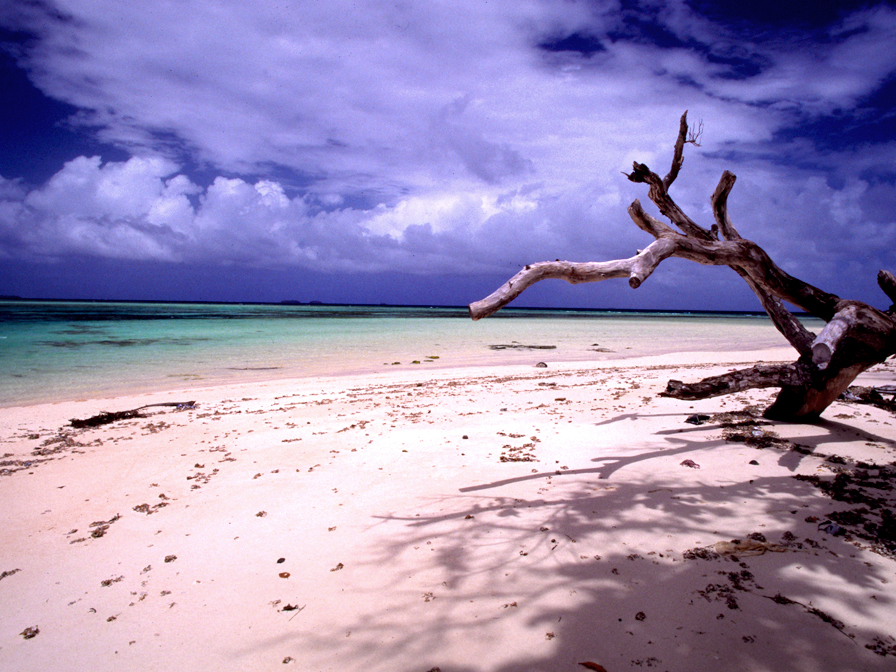
Beach scenery at Laura, Majuro, Marshall Islands

The Marshall Islands are located north of Nauru and Kiribati, east of the Federated States of Micronesia, and south of the U.S. territory of Wake Island. The islands consist of 29 low-lying atolls and five isolated islands, comprising 1,156 individual islands and islets. The atolls and islands form two groups: the Ratak Chain and the Ralik Chain (meaning "sunrise" and "sunset" chains). All the islands in the chain are part of the Republic of the Marshall Islands, a presidential republic in free association with the United States. Having few natural resources, the islands' wealth is based on a service economy, as well as some fishing and agriculture. Of the 29 atolls, 24 are inhabited.

Bikini Atoll is an atoll in the Marshall Islands. There are 23 islands in the Bikini Atoll. The islands of Bokonijien, Aerokojlol and part of Nam were destroyed during nuclear tests that occurred there. The islands are composed of low coral limestone and sand. The average elevation is only about 2.1 metres (7 ft) above low tide level.

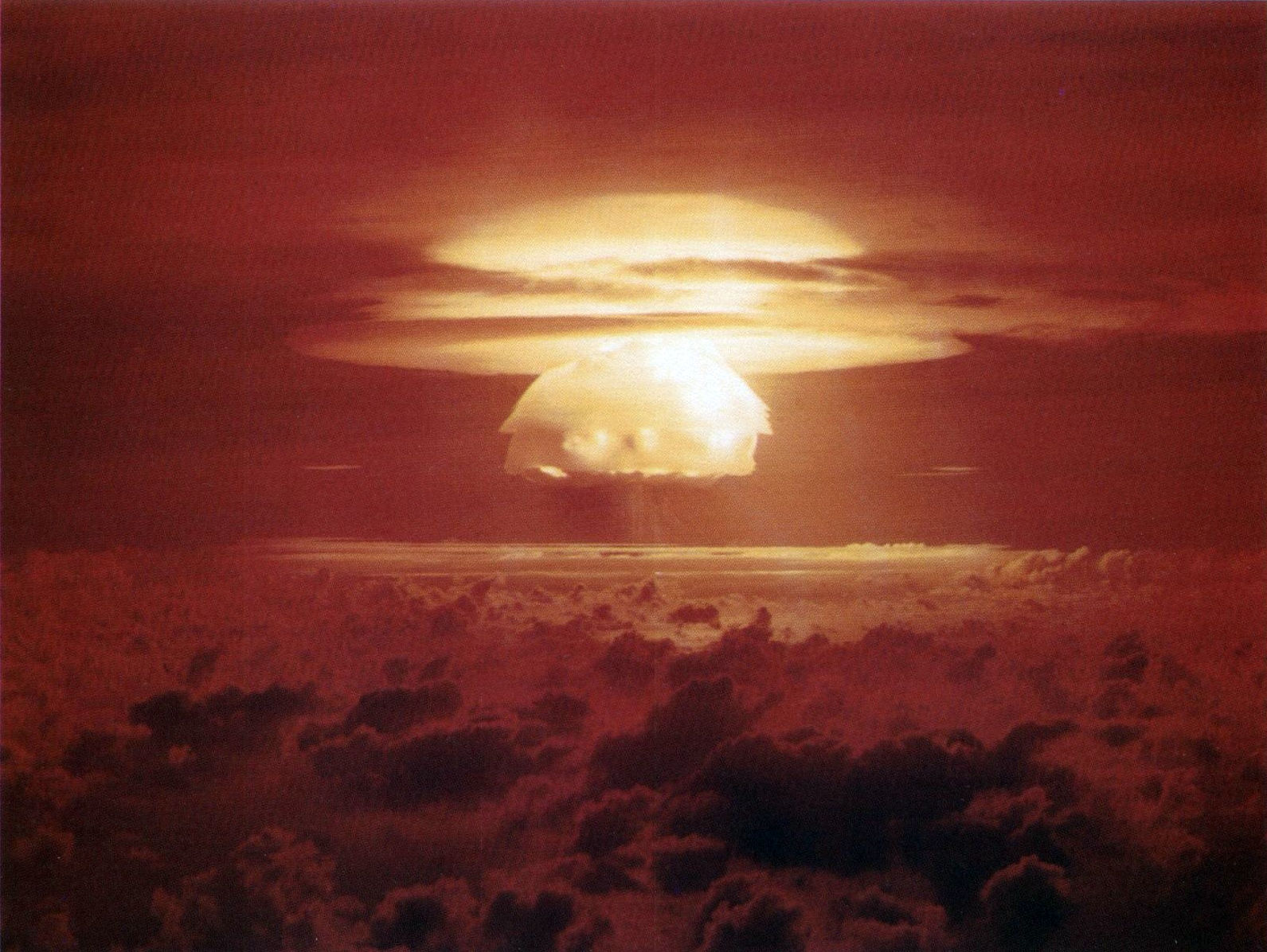
Image of the Castle Bravo nuclear test, detonated on 1 March 1954, at Bikini Atoll

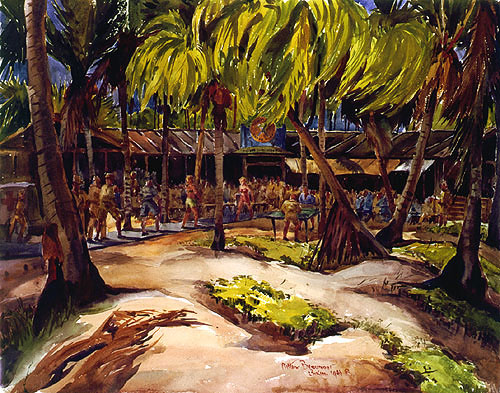
An illustration of the Cross Spikes Club of the US Navy on Bikini Atoll, one of several Marshall Islands used for atomic bomb tests.

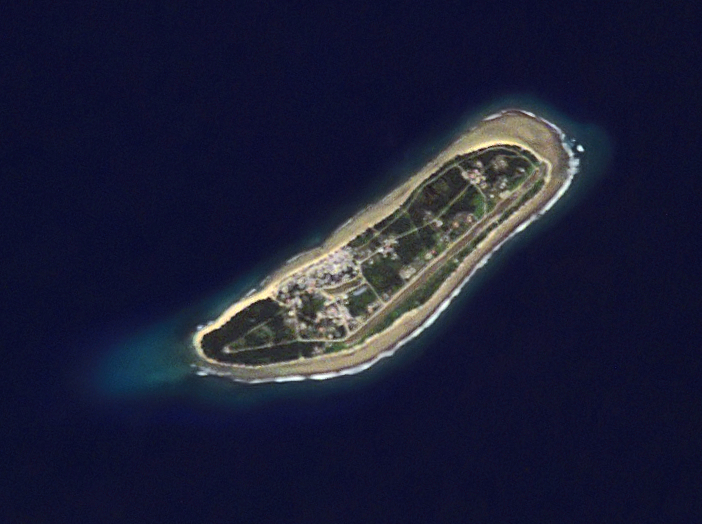
Kili Island is one of the smallest islands in the Marshall Islands.

=== Nauru ===
Nauru, officially the Republic of Naoero, is an oval-shaped island country in the southwestern Pacific Ocean, 42 km (26 mi) south of the Equator, listed as the world's smallest republic, covering just 21 km^{2} (8 sq mi). With 12,511 residents, it is the third least-populated country, after Vatican City and Tuvalu. The island is surrounded by a coral reef, which is exposed at low tide and dotted with pinnacles. The presence of the reef has prevented the establishment of a seaport, although channels in the reef allow small boats access to the island. A fertile coastal strip 150 to 300 m (490 to 980 ft) wide lies inland from the beach.

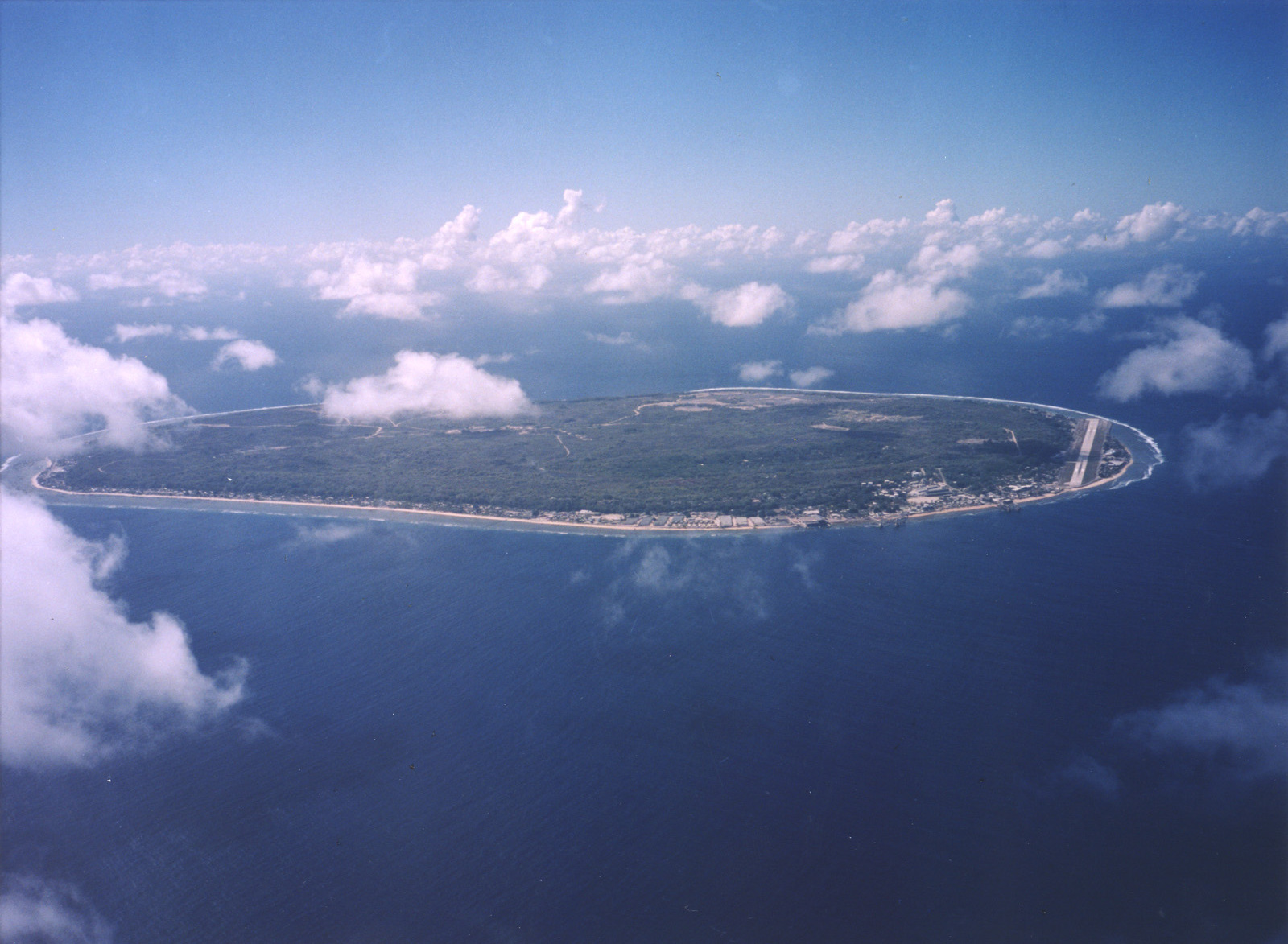
Aerial view of Nauru

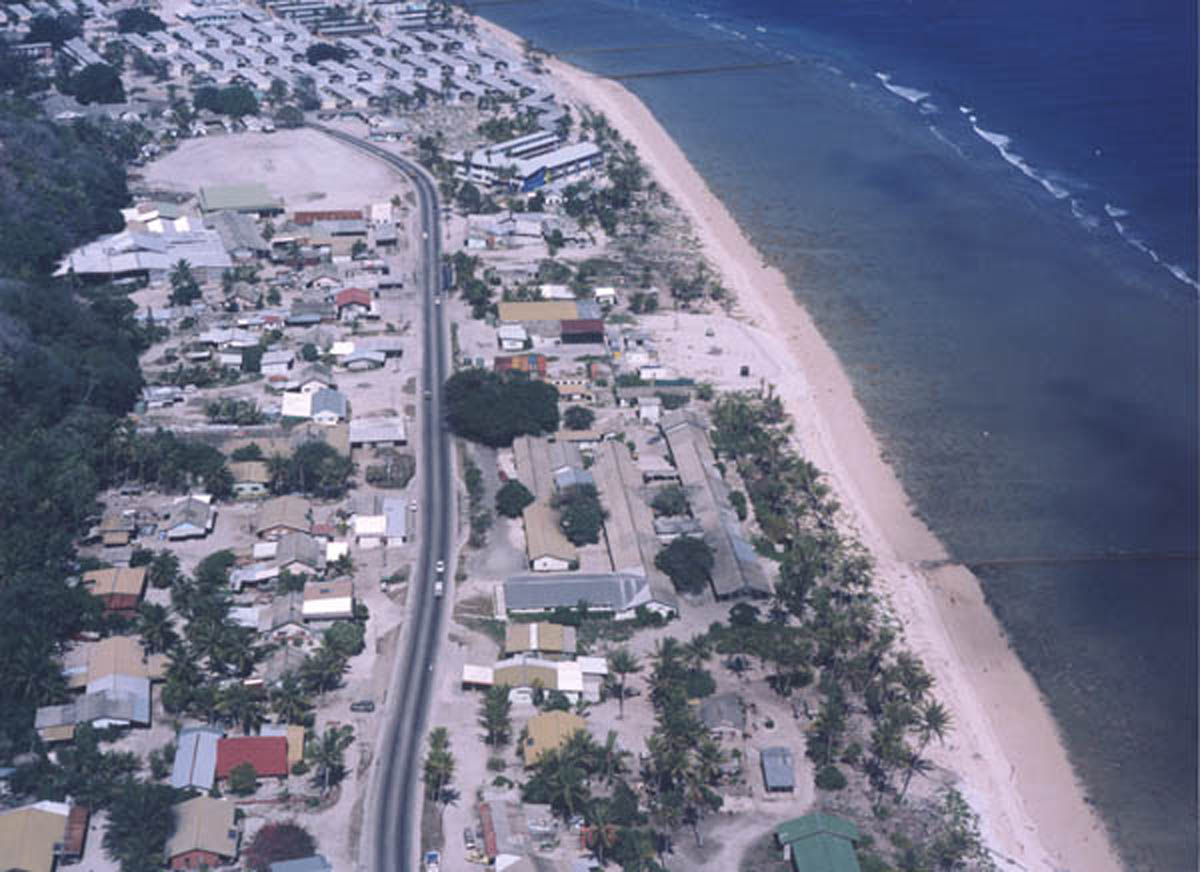
Nauruan districts of Denigomodu and Nibok

=== Wake Island ===
Wake Island is a coral atoll with a coastline of 19 km (12 mi) just north of the Marshall Islands. It is an unorganized, unincorporated territory of the United States. Access to the island is restricted and all activities on the island are managed by the United States Air Force. While geographically adjacent, it is not ethnoculturally part of Micronesia, due to its historical lack of human inhabitation. Micronesians may have possibly visited Wake Island in prehistoric times to harvest fish, but there is nothing to suggest any kind of settlement.

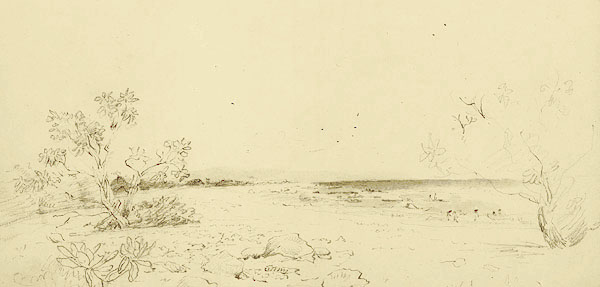
Wake Island as depicted by the United States Exploring Expedition, drawn by Alfred Thomas Agate

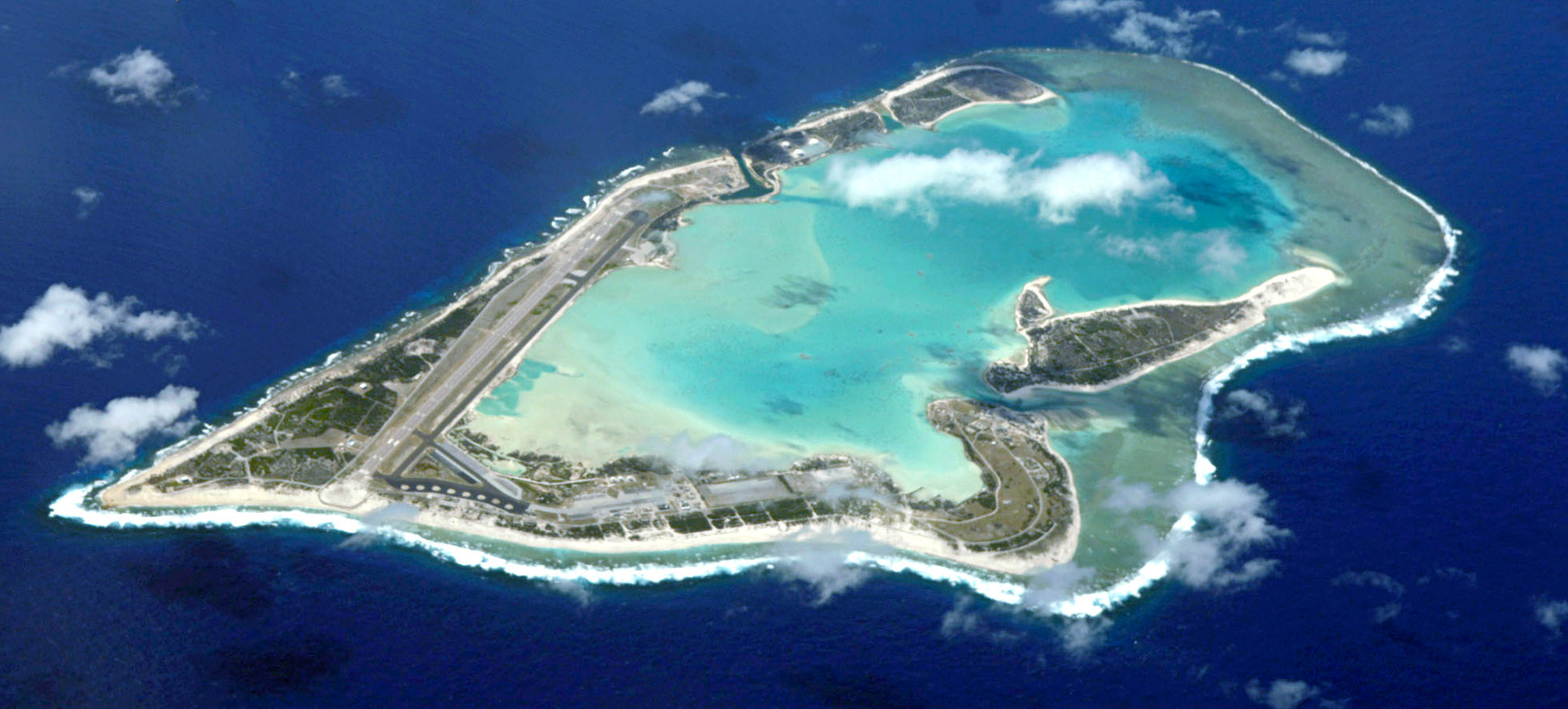
Aerial view Wake Island, looking westward

=== Geology ===
The majority of the islands in the area are part of a coral atoll. Coral atolls begin as coral reefs that grow on the slopes of a central volcano. When the volcano sinks back down into the sea, the coral continues to grow, keeping the reef at or above water level. One exception is Pohnpei in the Federated States of Micronesia, which still has the central volcano and coral reefs around it.

Some islands, such as Yap, have a more unusual geological history: rather than just being young volcanic sediment, they consist of uplifted volcanic and metamorphic rocks that were deformed and thrust upward during tectonic movement involving the Yap Trench and surrounding plate boundaries.

=== Fauna ===
The Yap Islands host a number of endemic bird species, including the Yap monarch and the Olive white-eye, in addition to four other restricted-range bird species. The endangered Yap flying-fox, though often considered a subspecies of the Pelew flying fox or the Mariana fruit bat, is also endemic to Yap.

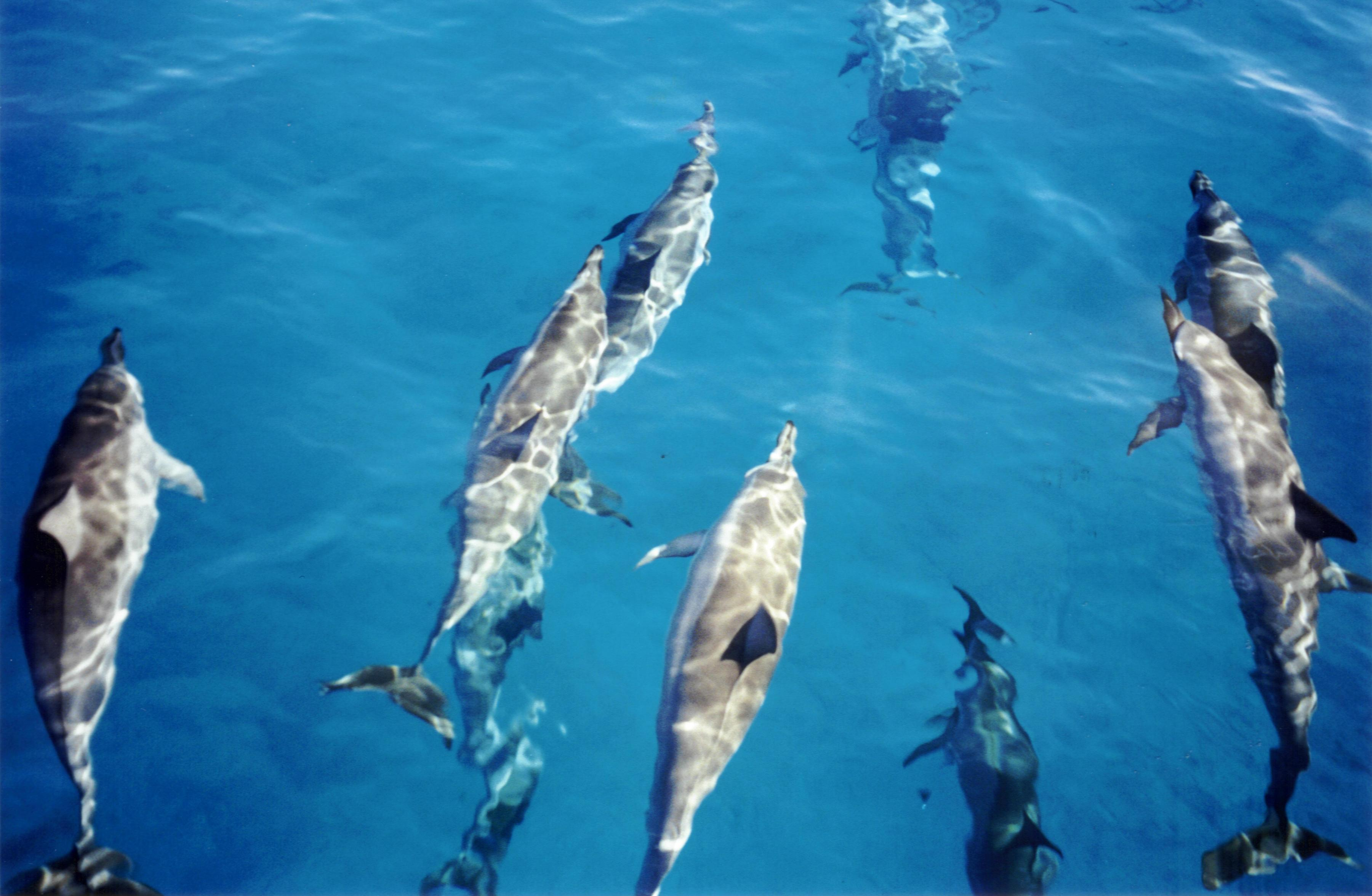
Spinner dolphins

=== Climate ===
The region has a tropical marine climate moderated by seasonal northeast trade winds. There is little seasonal temperature variation. The dry season runs from December or January to June and the rainy season from July to November or December. Because of the location of some islands, the rainy season can also include typhoons. Micronesia has a hot and humid climate, between 30-32 °C with night lows of around 23-25 °C.

== History ==
=== Prehistory ===
Chronological dispersal of Austronesian peoples across the Indo-Pacific

The Northern Mariana Islands were the first islands in Oceania colonized by the Austronesian peoples. They were settled by the voyagers who sailed eastwards from the Philippines in approximately 1500 BCE. These populations gradually moved southwards until they reached the Bismarck Archipelago and the Solomon Islands by 1300 BCE and reconnected with the Lapita culture of the southeast migration branch of Austronesians moving through coastal New Guinea and Island Melanesia. By 1200 BCE, they again began crossing open seas beyond inter-island visibility, reaching Vanuatu, Fiji, and New Caledonia; before continuing eastwards to become the ancestors of the Polynesian people.

Further migrations by other Austronesians also followed, likely from Sulawesi, settling Palau and Yap by around 1000 BCE. The details of this colonization, however, are not very well known. In 200 BCE, a loosely connected group of Lapita colonists from Island Melanesia also migrated back northwards, settling the islands of eastern Micronesia almost simultaneously. This region became the center of another wave of migrations radiating outwards, reconnecting them with other settled islands in western Micronesia.

Around 800 CE, a second wave of migrants from Southeast Asia arrived in the Marianas, beginning what is now known as the Latte period. These new settlers built large structures with distinctive capped stone pillars known as haligi. They also reintroduced rice (which did not survive earlier voyages), making the Northern Marianas the only islands in Oceania where rice was grown prior to European contact. However, it was considered a high-status crop and only used in rituals. It did not become a staple until after Spanish colonization.

Construction of Nan Madol, a megalithic complex made from basalt lava logs in Pohnpei, began in around 1180 CE. This was followed by the construction of the Leluh complex in Kosrae in around 1200.

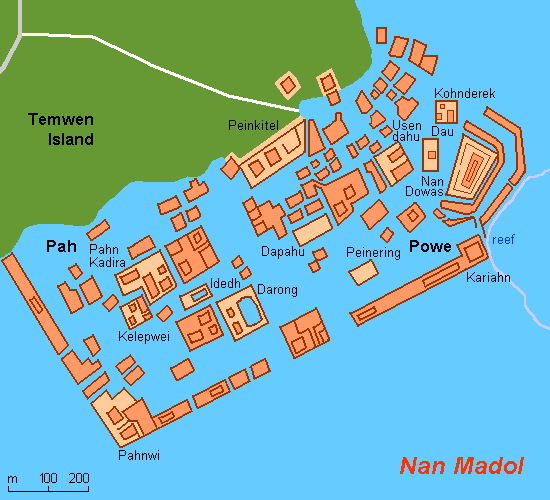
Central Nan Madol (map)

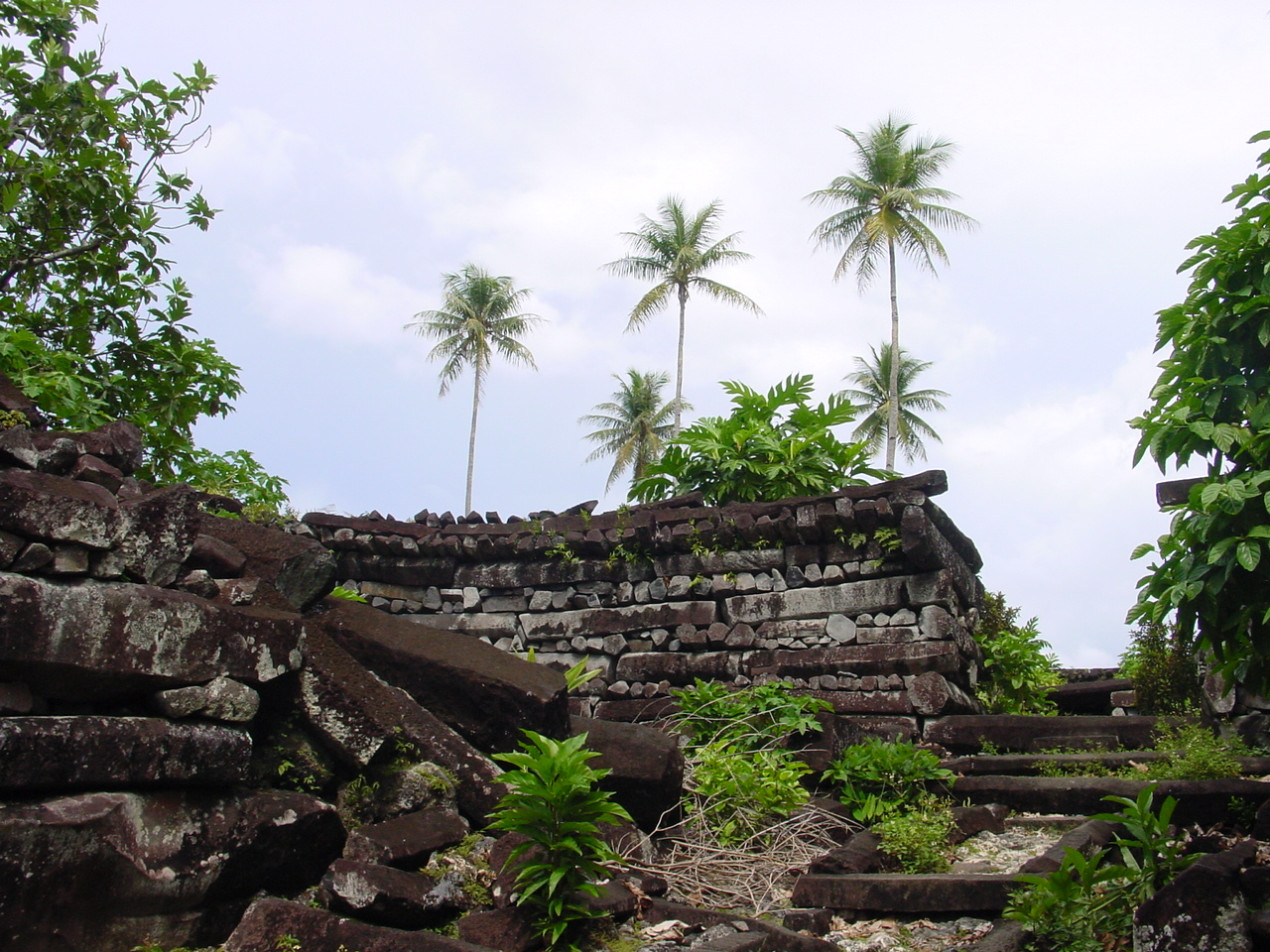
Nan Madol

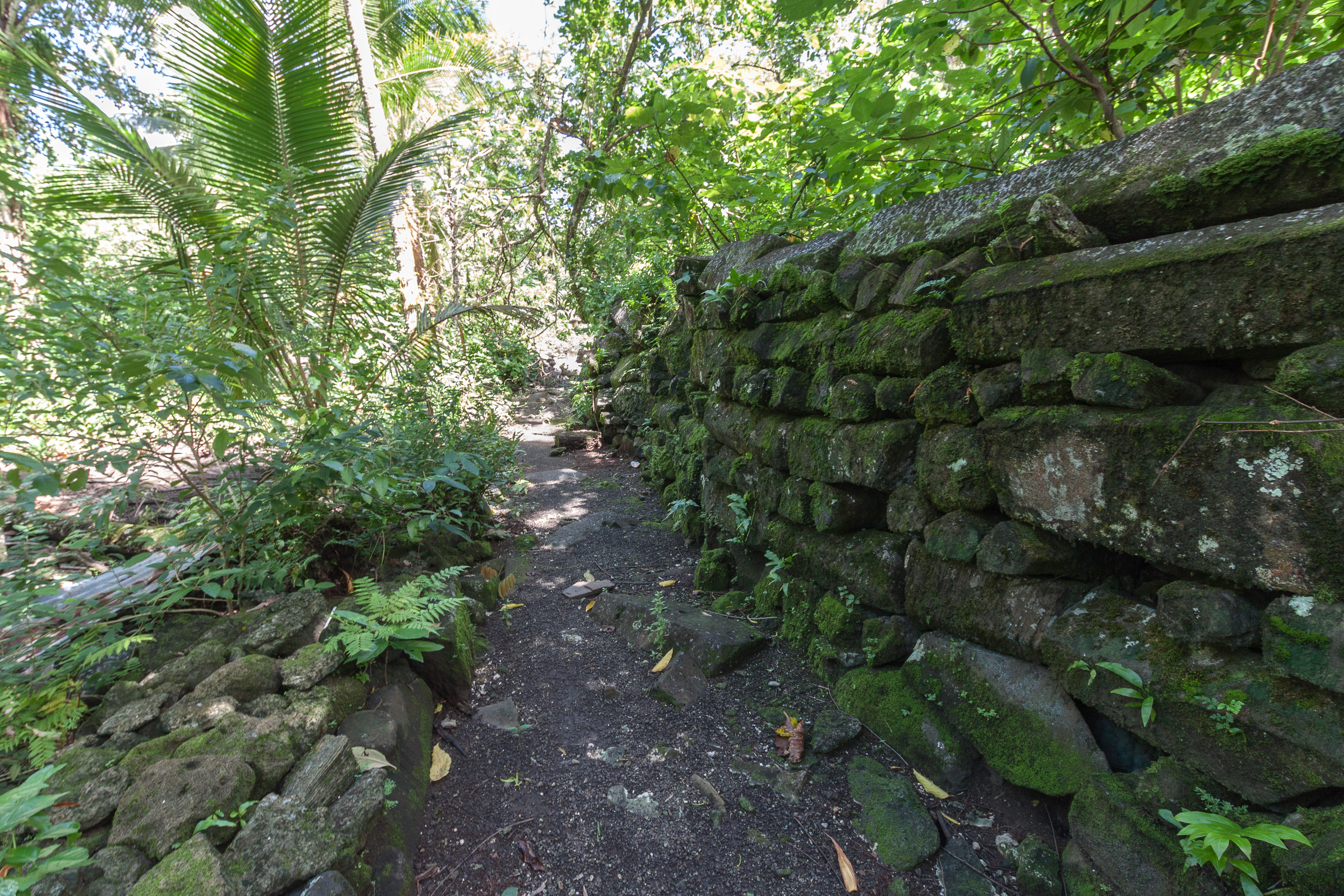
Leluh

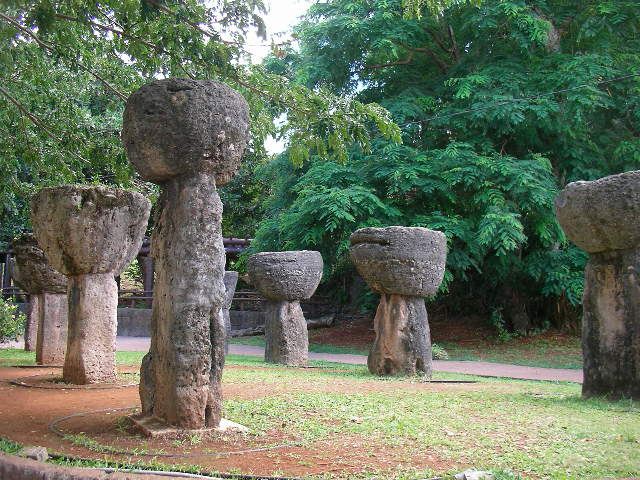
Latte stones

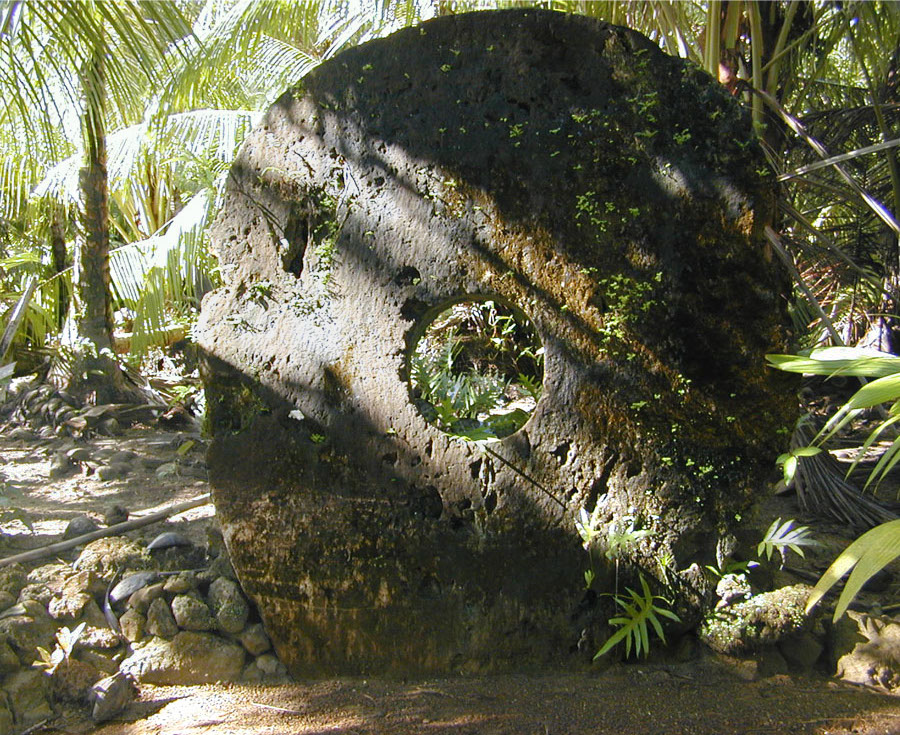
Rai stone

=== Early European contact ===
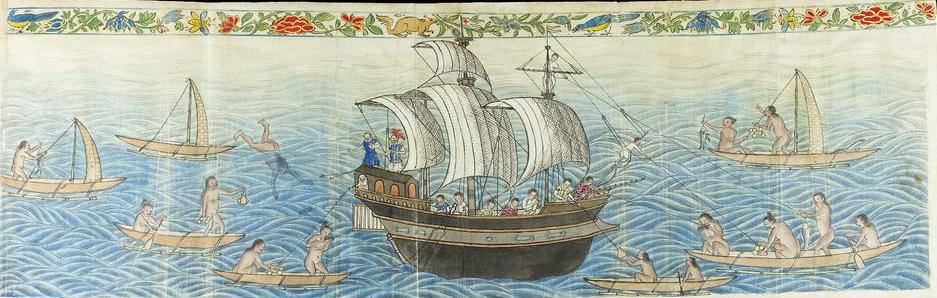
Manila Galleon in the Marianas and Carolinas, c. 1590 Boxer Codex

The earliest known contact with Europeans occurred in 1521, when a Spanish expedition under Ferdinand Magellan reached the Marianas. This contact is recorded in Antonio Pigafetta's chronicle of Magellan's voyage, in which he recounts that the Chamorro people had no apparent knowledge of people outside of their island group. A Portuguese account of the same voyage suggests that the Chamorro people who greeted the travellers did so "without any shyness as if they were good acquaintances".

Further contact was made during the sixteenth century, although often initial encounters were very brief. Documents relating to the 1525 voyage of Diogo da Rocha suggest that he made the first European contact with inhabitants of the Caroline Islands, possibly staying on the Ulithi atoll for four months and encountering Yap. Marshall Islanders were encountered by the expedition of Spanish navigator Álvaro de Saavedra Cerón in 1529. Other contact with the Yap islands occurred in 1625.

=== Colonisation and conversion ===
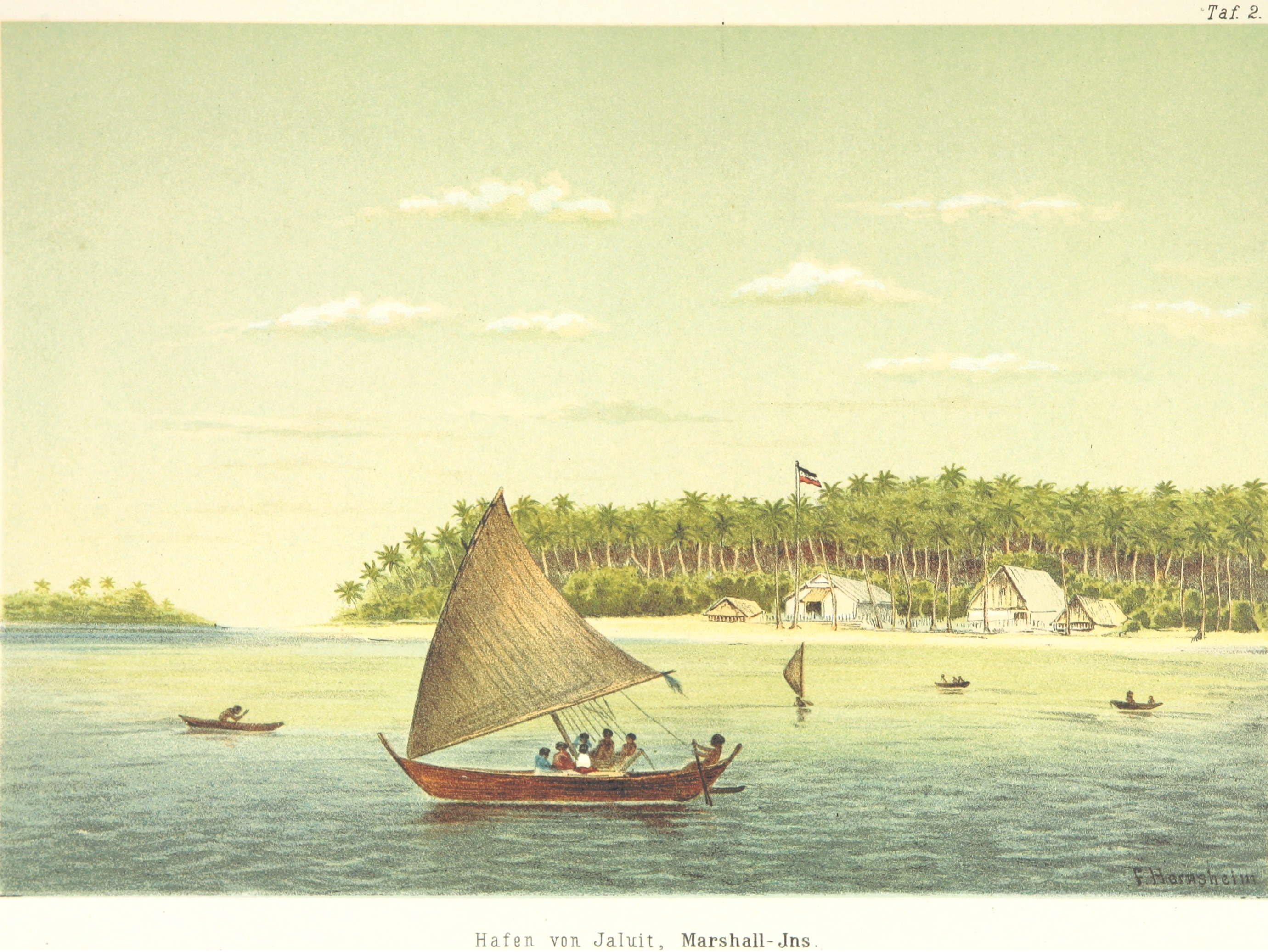
German trading station at Jaluit Atoll with a Marshallese korkor outrigger canoe in the foreground

In the early 17th century Spain colonized Guam, the Northern Marianas and the Caroline Islands (what would later become the Federated States of Micronesia and the Republic of Palau), creating the Spanish East Indies, which was governed from the Spanish Philippines.

When Russian explorer Otto von Kotzebue visited the Marshall Islands in 1817, he noted that Marshallese families practiced infanticide after the birth of a third child as a form of population planning due to frequent famines.

In 1819, the American Board of Commissioners for Foreign Missions—a Protestant group—brought their Puritan ways to Polynesia. Soon after, the Hawaiian Missionary Society was founded and sent missionaries into Micronesia. Conversion was not met with as much opposition, as the local religions were less developed (at least according to Western ethnographic accounts). In contrast, it took until the end of the 19th to the beginning of the 20th centuries for missionaries to fully convert the inhabitants of Melanesia; however, a comparison of the cultural contrast must take into account the fact that Melanesia has always had deadly strains of malaria present in various degrees and distributions throughout its history (see De Rays Expedition) and up to the present; conversely, Micronesia does not have—and never seems to have had—any malarial mosquitos nor pathogens on any of its islands in the past.

=== German–Spanish Treaty of 1899 ===
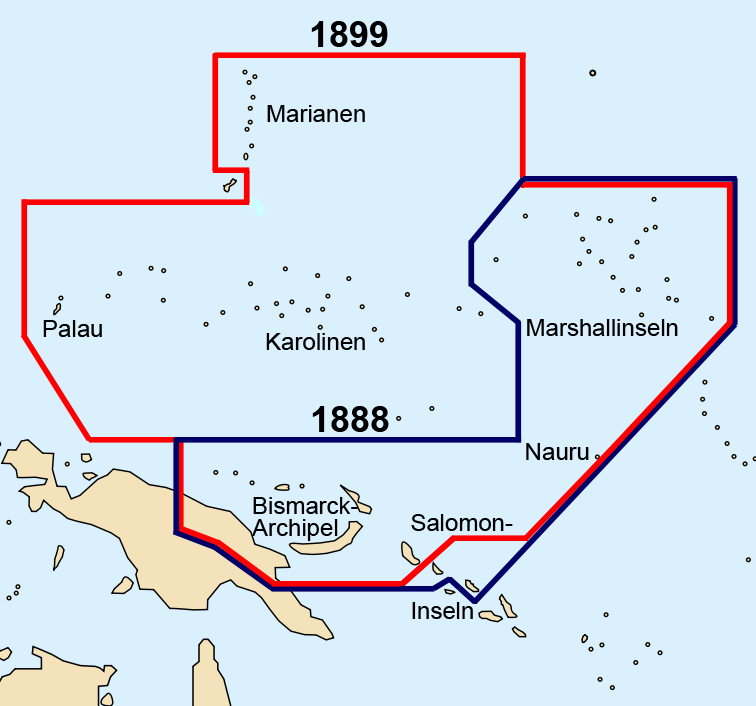
German New Guinea before and after the German-Spanish treaty of 1899

In the Spanish–American War, Spain lost many of its remaining colonies. In the Pacific, the United States took possession of the Spanish Philippines and Guam. On 17 January 1899, the United States also took possession of unclaimed and uninhabited Wake Island. This left Spain with the remainder of the Spanish East Indies, about 6,000 tiny islands that were sparsely populated and not very productive. These islands were ungovernable after the loss of the administrative center of Manila and indefensible after the loss of two Spanish fleets in the war. The Spanish government therefore decided to sell the remaining islands to a new colonial power: the German Empire.

The treaty, which was signed by Spanish Prime Minister Francisco Silvela on 12 February 1899, transferred the Caroline Islands (Kosrae in the east to Palau in the west), the Mariana Islands, and other possessions to Germany. Under German control, the islands became a protectorate and were administered from German New Guinea. Nauru had already been annexed and claimed as a colony by Germany in 1888.

=== 20th century ===
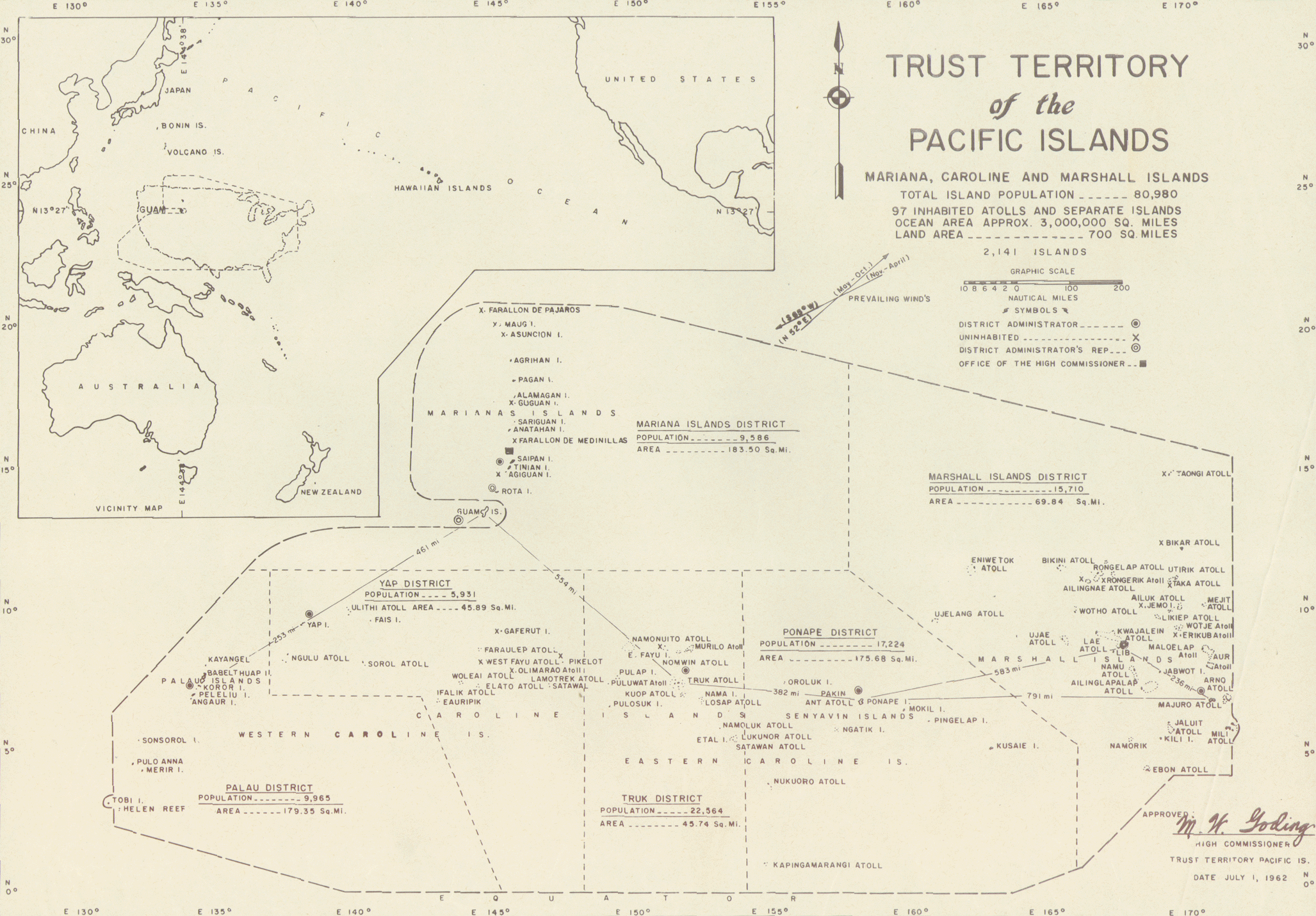
Map from 1961 of the US Trust Territory of the Pacific Islands, formerly Japan's South Seas Mandate.

In the early 20th century, the islands of Micronesia were divided between three foreign powers:

- the United States, which took control of Guam following the Spanish–American War of 1898 and claimed Wake Island;
- Germany, which took Nauru and bought the Marshall, Caroline and Northern Mariana Islands from Spain; and
- the British Empire, which took the Gilbert Islands (Kiribati).

During World War I, Germany's Pacific island territories were seized and became League of Nations mandates in 1923. Nauru became an Australian mandate, while Germany's other territories in Micronesia were given as a mandate to Japan and were named the South Seas Mandate. During World War II, Nauru and Ocean Island were occupied by Japanese troops, with also an occupation of some of the Gilbert Islands and were bypassed by the Allied advance across the Pacific. Following Japan's defeat in World War II its mandate became a United Nations Trusteeship administered by the United States as the Trust Territory of the Pacific Islands. Nauru became independent in 1968.

=== 21st century ===
Today, most of Micronesia are independent states, except for the U.S. Commonwealth of the Northern Mariana Islands, Guam and Wake Island, which are U.S. territories.

== States and dependencies ==
Country	Population (July 2021 estimate)	Area (km^{2})	Population density (/km^{2})	Urban population	Life expectancy	Literacy rate	Official language(s)	Main religion(s)	Ethnic groups	Major Islands
Federated States of Micronesia	113,131	702	158	22%	71.2	89%	English	Roman Catholic 50%, Protestant 47%, others 3%	Chuukese 48.8%, Pohnpeian 24.2%, Kosraean 6.2%, Yapese 5.2%, Yap outer islands 4.5%, Asian 1.8%, Polynesian 1.5%, other 7.8%	Chuuk, Pohnpei, Kosrae, Yap
Guam (United States)	170,534	540	299	93%	78.2	99%	English 38.3%, Chamorro 22.2%	Roman Catholic 85%, Buddhism 3.6%, other religion 11.4%	Chamorro 37.1%, Filipino 26.3%, Other Pacific Islander 11.3%, Mixed 9.8% White 6.9%, other 8.6%.	Guam
Kiribati	128,874	811	152	44%	64.0	92%	English, Gilbertese (de facto)	Roman Catholic 55%, Protestant 36%	Micronesian 98.8%	Tarawa atoll, Banaba
Marshall Islands	42,050	181	293	71%	71.5	93.7%	Marshallese 98.2%, English	Protestant 54.8%, other Christian 40.6%	Marshallese 92.1%, Mixed Marshallese 5.9%, Other 2%	Majuro atoll, Kwajalein atoll
Nauru	12,511	21	480	100%	65.0	99%	Nauruan, English (de facto)	Nauru Congregational Church 35.4%, Roman Catholic 33.2%, Nauru Independent Church (Protestant) 10.4%, Baha'i faith 10%, Buddhism 9%	Nauruan 58%, other Pacific Islander 26%, Chinese 8%, European 8%	Nauru
Northern Mariana Islands (United States)	49,481	464	113	91%	76.9	97%	English, Chamorro and Carolinian	Roman Catholic, Buddhism 10.6%	Asian 56.3%, Pacific islander 36.3%, Mixed 4.8%, White 1.8%, Other 0.8%.	Saipan, Tinian, Rota
Palau	18,024	459	47	81%	71.5	92%	Palauan 64.7%, English	Roman Catholic 41.6%, Protestant 23.3%	Palauan 69.9%, Filipino 15.3%, Chinese 4.9%, Other Asian 2.4%, White 1.9%, Carolinian 1.4%, Other Micronesian 1.1%, Other 3.2%	Babeldaob, Koror, Peleliu, Angaur
Total	534,606	3,178								

=== Politics ===
The Pacific Community (SPC) is a regional intergovernmental organization whose membership includes both nations and territories in the Pacific Ocean and their metropolitan powers.

== Economy ==
Nationally, the primary income is the sale of fishing rights to foreign nations that harvest tuna using huge purse seiners. A few Japanese long liners still ply the waters. The crews aboard fishing fleets contribute little to the local economy since their ships typically set sail loaded with stores and provisions that are cheaper than local goods. Additional money comes in from government grants, mostly from the United States, and the $150 million the US paid into a trust fund for reparations of residents of Bikini Atoll who had to move after nuclear testing. Few mineral deposits worth exploiting exist, except for some high-grade phosphate, especially on Nauru.

Most residents of Micronesia can freely move to and work within, the United States. Relatives working in the US who send money home to relatives represent the primary source of individual income. Additional individual income comes mainly from government jobs and work within shops and restaurants.

The tourist industry consists mainly of scuba divers that come to see the coral reefs, do wall dives and visit sunken ships from WWII. Major stops for scuba divers in approximate order are Palau, Chuuk, Yap and Pohnpei. Some private yacht owners visit the area for months or years at a time. However, they tend to stay mainly at ports of entry and are too few in number to be counted as a major source of income.

Copra production used to be a more significant source of income, however, world prices have dropped in part to large palm plantations that are now planted in places like Borneo.

== Demographics ==
The people today form many ethnicities, but all are descended from and belong to the Micronesian culture.

Because of this mixture of descent, many of the ethnicities of Micronesia feel closer to some groups in Melanesia, or the Philippines. A good example of this are the Yapese people who are related to Austronesian tribes in the northern Philippines. Genetics also show a significant number of Micronesian have Japanese paternal ancestry: 9.5% of males from Micronesia as well as 0.2% in East Timor carry the Haplogroup D-M55.

There are also substantial Asian communities found across the region, most notably in the Northern Mariana Islands where they form the majority and smaller communities of Europeans who have migrated from the United States or are descendants of settlers during European colonial rule in Micronesia.

Though they are all geographically part of the same region, they all have very different colonial histories. The US-administered areas of Micronesia have a unique experience that sets them apart from the rest of the Pacific. Micronesia has great economic dependency on its former or current motherlands, something only comparable to the French Pacific. Sometimes, the term American Micronesia is used to acknowledge the difference in cultural heritage.

A 2011 survey found that 93.1% of Micronesian are Christians; a survey in 2022 showed that 99% were Christian.

=== Demographic table ===
The countries and territories in this table are categorised according to the scheme for geographic subregions used by the United Nations. The information shown follows sources in cross-referenced articles; where sources differ, provisos have been clearly indicated. These territories and regions are subject to various additional categorisations, depending on the source and purpose of each description.

Arms	Flag	Name of region, followed by countries	Area (km^{2})	Population (2021)	Population density (per km^{2})	Capital	ISO 3166-1
Federated States of Micronesia	(Federated States of Micronesia)	Federated States of Micronesia	702	113,131	149.5	Palikir	FM
Guam	(Guam)	Guam (United States)	549	170,534	296.7	Hagåtña	GU
Kiribati	(Kiribati)	Kiribati	811	128,874	141.1	South Tarawa	KI
Marshall Islands	(Marshall Islands)	Marshall Islands	181	42,050	293.2	Majuro	MH
Nauru	(Nauru)	Nauru	21	12,511	540.3	Yaren (de facto)	NR
Northern Mariana Islands	(Northern Mariana Islands)	Northern Mariana Islands (United States)	477	49,481	115.4	Saipan	MP
Palau	(Palau)	Palau	458	18,024	46.9	Ngerulmud	PW
United States	(United States)	Wake Island (United States)	2	150	75	Wake Island	UM
Micronesia (total)			3,307	526,343	163.5		

=== Indigenous groups ===
==== Micronesians ====
===== Carolinian people =====
It is thought that ancestors of the Carolinian people may have originally immigrated from the Asian mainland and Indonesia to Micronesia around 2,000 years ago. Their primary language is Carolinian, called Refaluwasch by native speakers, which has a total of about 5,700 speakers. The Carolinians have a matriarchal society in which respect is a very important factor in their daily lives, especially toward the matriarchs. Most Carolinians are of the Roman Catholic faith.

The immigration of Carolinians to Saipan began in the early 19th century, after the Spanish reduced the local population of Chamorro natives to just 3,700. They began to immigrate mostly sailing from small canoes from other islands, which a typhoon previously devastated. The Carolinians have a much darker complexion than the native Chamorros.

===== Chamorro people =====
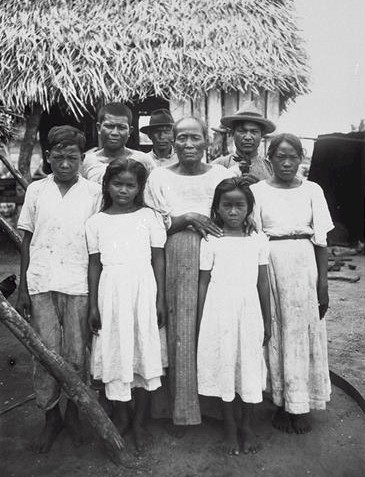
Chamorro people in 1915

The Chamorro people are the indigenous peoples of the Mariana Islands, which are politically divided between the United States territory of Guam and the United States Commonwealth of the Northern Mariana Islands in Micronesia. The Chamorro are commonly believed to have come from Southeast Asia at around 2000 BC. They are most closely related to other Austronesian natives to the west in the Philippines and Taiwan, as well as the Carolines to the south.

The Chamorro language is included in the Malayo-Polynesian subgroup of the Austronesian family. Because Guam was colonized by Spain for over 300 years, many words derive from the Spanish language. The traditional Chamorro number system was replaced by Spanish numbers.

===== Chuukese people =====
The Chuukese people are an ethnic group in Oceania. They constitute 48% of the population of the Federated States of Micronesia. Their language is Chuukese. The home atoll of Chuuk is also known by the former name Truk.

===== Nauruan people =====
The Nauruan people are an ethnicity inhabiting the Pacific island of Nauru. They are most likely a blend of other Pacific peoples.

The origin of the Nauruan people has not yet been finally determined. It can possibly be explained by the last Malayo-Pacific human migration (c. 1200). It was probably seafaring or shipwrecked Polynesians or Melanesians that established themselves in Nauru because there was not already an indigenous people present, whereas the Micronesians were already crossed with the Melanesians in this area.

==== Kaping people ====
The roughly 3000 residents of the Federated States of Micronesia that reside in Kapingamarangi, nicknamed 'Kapings', live in one of the most remote locations in both Micronesia and the world at large. Their home atoll is almost 320 km (200 mi) from the nearest point of immigration. There are no regular flights; the only reliable way to legally visit is to travel on a high-speed sailboat to the atoll. Owing to this difficulty, few sailors travelling the Pacific attempt to visit. The local language is the Kapingamarangi language. From the 1970s, to attend high school the children needed to travel to Pohnpei, bringing their parents with them to create communities of Kapings on the island.

=== Immigrant groups ===
==== East, South, and Southeast Asian people ====
There are large East, South and Southeast Asian communities found across certain Micronesian countries that are either immigrants, foreign workers or descendants of either one, most migrated to the islands during the 1800s and 1900s. According to the 2010 census results Guam was 26.3% Filipino, 2.2% Korean, 1.6% Chinese and 2% other Asian. The 2010 census showed the Northern Mariana Islands was 50% Asian of which 35.3% were Filipino, 6.8% Chinese, 4.2% Korean and 3.7% other Asian (mainly Japanese, Bangladeshi and Thai). The 2010 census for the Federated States of Micronesia showed 1.4% were Asian while statistics for Nauru showed 8% of Nauruans were Chinese. The 2005 census results for Palau showed 16.3% were Filipino, 1.6% Chinese, 1.6% Vietnamese and 3.4% other Asian (mostly Bangladeshi, Japanese and Korean).

Japanese rule in Micronesia also led to Japanese people settling the islands and marrying native spouses. Kessai Note, the former president of the Marshall Islands has partial Japanese ancestry by way of his paternal grandfather, and Emanuel Mori, the former president of the Federated States of Micronesia, is descended from one of the first settlers from Japan, Koben Mori.

A significant number of Micronesians were shown to have paternal genetic relations with Japanese Haplogroup D-M55. Genetic testing found that 9.5% of males from Micronesia as well as 0.2% in East Timor carry what is believed to reflect recent admixture from Japan. That is, D-M116.1 (D1b1) is generally believed to be a primary subclade of D-M64.1 (D1b), possibly as a result of the Japanese military occupation of Southeast Asia during World War II.

==== European people ====
The 2010 census results of Guam showed 7.1% were white while the 2005 census for Nauru showed 8% were European. Smaller numbers at 1.9% in Palau and 1.8% in the Northern Mariana Islands were recorded as "white". In conjunction to the European communities there are large amounts of mixed Micronesians, some of which have European ancestry.

Languages of Micronesia.

=== Languages ===
The largest group of languages spoken in Micronesia are the Micronesian languages. They are in the family of Oceanic languages, part of the Austronesian language group. They descended from the Proto-Oceanic, which in turn descended via Proto-Malayo-Polynesian from Proto-Austronesian. The languages in the Micronesian family are Marshallese, Gilbertese, Kosraean, Nauruan, as well as a large sub-family called the Chuukic–Pohnpeic languages containing 11 languages.

On the eastern edge of the Federated States of Micronesia, the languages Nukuoro and Kapingamarangi represent an extreme westward extension of the Polynesian branch of Oceanic.

Finally, there are two Malayo-Polynesian languages spoken in Micronesia that do not belong to the Oceanic languages: Chamorro in the Mariana Islands and Palauan in Palau.

== Culture ==
=== Animals and food ===
By the time Western contact occurred, although Palau did not have dogs, they did have fowls and possibly pigs. Pigs are not native to Micronesia. Fruit bats are native to Palau, but other mammals are rare. Reptiles are numerous and both mollusks and fish are an important food source. The people of Palau, the Marianas and Yap often chew betel nuts seasoned with lime and pepper leaf. Western Micronesia was unaware of the ceremonial drink, which was called saka on Kosrae and sakau on Pohnpei.

=== Architecture ===
The book Prehistoric Architecture in Micronesia argues that the most prolific pre-colonial Micronesian architecture is "Palau's monumental sculpted hills, megalithic stone carvings and elaborately decorated structure of wood placed on piers above elevated stone platforms". The archeological traditions of the Yapese people remained relatively unchanged even after the first European contact with the region during Magellan's 1520s circumnavigation of the globe.

=== Art ===
Micronesia's artistic tradition has developed from the Lapita culture. Among the most prominent works of the region is the megalithic floating city of Nan Madol. The city began in 1200 CE and was still being built when European explorers begin to arrive around 1600. The city, however, had declined by around 1800 along with the Saudeleur dynasty and was completely abandoned by the 1820s. During the 19th century, the region was divided between the colonial powers, but art continued to thrive. Wood-carving, particularly by men, flourished in the region, resulted in richly decorated ceremonial houses in Belau, stylized bowls, canoe ornaments, ceremonial vessels and sometimes sculptured figures. Women created textiles and ornaments such as bracelets and headbands. Stylistically, traditional Micronesian art is streamlined and of a practical simplicity to its function, but is typically finished to a high standard of quality. This was mostly to make the best possible use of what few natural materials they had available to them.

The first half of the 20th century saw a downturn in Micronesia's cultural integrity and a strong foreign influence from both western and Japanese Imperialist powers. A number of historical artistic traditions, especially sculpture, ceased to be practiced, although other art forms continued, including traditional architecture and weaving. Independence from colonial powers in the second half of the century resulted in a renewed interest in, and respect for, traditional arts. A notable movement of contemporary art also appeared in Micronesia towards the end of the 20th century.

=== Cuisine ===
The cuisine of the Mariana Islands is tropical in nature, including such dishes as kelaguen as well as many others.

Marshallese cuisine comprises the fare and foodways of the Marshall Islands, and includes local foods such as breadfruit, taro root, pandanus and seafood, among others.

Palauan cuisine includes local foods such as cassava, taro, yam, potato, fish and pork. Western cuisine is favored among young Palauans.

=== Education ===
The educational systems in the nations of Micronesia vary depending on the country and there are several higher-level educational institutions.

The CariPac consists of institutions of higher education in Guam, the Northern Mariana Islands, American Samoa, Puerto Rico, the U.S. Virgin Islands, the Federated States of Micronesia, the Marshall Islands and Palau. The Agricultural Development in the American Pacific is a partnership of the University of Hawaii, American Samoa Community College, College of Micronesia, Northern Marianas College and the University of Guam.

In the Federated States of Micronesia, education is required for citizens aged 6 to 13, and is important to their economy. The literacy rate for citizens aged 15 to 24 is 98.8%. The College of Micronesia-FSM has a campus in each of the four states with its national campus in the capital city of Palikir, Pohnpei. The COM-FSM system also includes the Fisheries and Maritime Institute (FMI) on the Yap islands.

The public education in Guam is organized by the Guam Department of Education. Guam also has several educational institutions, such as University of Guam, Pacific Islands University and Guam Community College, There is also the Guam Public Library System and the Umatac Outdoor Library.

Weriyeng is one of the last two schools of traditional navigation found in the central Caroline Islands in Micronesia, the other being Fanur.

The Northern Marianas College is a two-year community college located in the United States Commonwealth of the Northern Mariana Islands (CNMI).

The College of the Marshall Islands is a community college in the Marshall Islands.

=== Law ===
Understanding Law in Micronesia notes that The Federated States of Micronesia's laws and legal institutions are "uninterestingly similar to [those of Western countries]". However, it explains that "law in Micronesia is an extraordinary flux and flow of contrasting thought and meaning, inside and outside the legal system". It says that a knee-jerk reaction would be that law is disarrayed in the region and that improvement is required, but argues that the failure is "one endemic to the nature of law or to the ideological views we hold about law".

The Trust Territory of the Pacific Islands, a United Nations Trusteeship administered by the United States, borrowed heavily from United States law in establishing the Trust Territory Code during the Law and Development movement of the late 1950s and early 1960s. Many of those provisions were adopted by the new Congress of the Federated States of Micronesia when the Federated States of Micronesia became self-governing in 1979.

=== Media ===
In September 2007, journalists in the region founded the Micronesian Media Association.

=== Music and dance ===
Micronesian music is influential to those living in the Micronesian islands. Some of the music is based around mythology and ancient Micronesian rituals. It covers a range of styles from traditional songs, handed down through generations, to contemporary music.

Traditional beliefs suggest that the music can be presented to people in dreams and trances, rather than being written by composers themselves. Micronesian folk music is, like Polynesian music, primarily vocal-based.

In the Marshall Islands, the roro is a kind of traditional chant, usually about ancient legends and performed to give guidance during navigation and strength for mothers in labour. Modern bands have blended the unique songs of each island in the country with modern music. Though drums are not generally common in Micronesian music, one-sided hourglass-shaped drums are a major part of Marshallese music. There is a traditional Marshallese dance called beet, which is influenced by Spanish folk dances; in it, men and women side-step in parallel lines. There is a kind of stick dance performed by the Jobwa, nowadays only for very special occasions.

Popular music, both from Micronesia and from other areas of the world, is played on radio stations in Micronesia.

=== Sports ===
The region is home to the Micronesian Games. This quadrennial international multi-sport event involves all of Micronesia's countries and territories except Wake Island.

Nauru has two national sports, weightlifting and Australian rules football. According to 2007 Australian Football League International Census figures, there are around 180 players in the Nauru senior competition and 500 players in the junior competition, representing a participation rate of over 30% overall for the country.

== Religion and mythology ==
The predominant religion in Micronesia is Christianity (93%). According to 2023 government statistics, 55% of the population were Catholic and 42% were Protestant, while 2% belonged to other Christian denominations. Other religious groups exist including Baha'is, Buddhists, Hindus, Jews, and Muslims.

Micronesian mythology comprises the traditional belief systems of the people of Micronesia. There is no single belief system in the islands of Micronesia, as each island region has its own mythological beings. It was noted that 2.7% of the population followed folk religions in 2014.

There are several significant figures and myths in the traditions of the Federated States of Micronesia, Nauru, and Kiribati.

Shinto shrines dating from during or after World War II exist in some Micronesian countries.

== See also ==
- Flags of Oceania
- Australasia
- Melanesia
- Polynesia
- Micronesian outliers
