= Carns =

Carns is a surname. Notable people with the surname include:

- Alistair Carns (born 1980), British politician
- Edmund C. Carns (1844–1895), American politician
- Michael P. C. Carns (born 1937), United States Air Force general
- R. L. Carns (1886–1964), American football coach, athletics administrator
- Rachel Carns (born 1969), American musician
- Sally Carns, American graphic designer

== See also ==
- Carn (disambiguation)
- Carns Cairn
- Carns, Nebraska
- Lists_of_mountains_and_hills_in_the_British_Isles#Carns
- Carns State Aid Bridge
