= ADAP =

ADAP or Adap may refer to:

- Adap language, in Bhutan
- ADAP1 (gene)
- ADAP2 (gene)
- Associação Desportiva Atlética do Paraná
- Adhesion and Degranulation promoting Adapter Protein, also known as FYB or SLAP-130
- Agricultural Development in the American Pacific
- AIDS Drug Assistance Programs
