= Tomich =

Tomich may refer to:

- Tomich (village) in the Scottish Highlands, United Kingdom
- USS Tomich (DE-242), Edsall-class destroyer escort

== People with the surname ==
- Jared Tomich (b. 1974), American football player
- Pere Tomich, 15th century Catalan historian
- Peter Tomich (1893–1941), American navy war hero
- Tommi Tomich (b. 1980), Australian football (soccer) player

== See also ==
- Tomić, a Slavic surname sometimes transliterated as Tomich
