= USS Carib =

USS Carib is a name used more than once by the U.S. Navy:

- USS Carib (ID-1765) was a cargo ship built in 1916 by Detroit Shipbuilding Co., Detroit, Michigan.
- USS Carib (AT-82) was launched 7 February 1943 by Charleston Shipbuilding and Dry Dock Co., Charleston, South Carolina.
