= Calì =

Calì, also written in English as Cali, is an Italian surname, widespread mainly in the Ionian side of Sicily. The origin of surname Calì is thought to be from the Greek word kalos (beautiful), or from its Sanskrit root kali (time).

Notable people with the name Cali:

== Surname ==
=== Italy ===
- Aimone Calì (born 1997), an Italian football player
- Davide Cali (born 1972), a Swiss-born Italian writer
- Francesco Calì (1882–1949), Italian footballer, first captain of the Italian national team
- Gaetano Emanuel Calì (1885–1936), Italian composer and orchestra conductor
- Gennaro Calì (c. 1799–1877) an Italian sculptor
- Giulio Calì (1895–1967), Italian actor
- Giuseppe Calì (golfer) (born 1952), Italian golfer
- Pina Calì (1905–1949), an Italian painter
- Vincenza Calì (born 1983), Italian track and field athlete

=== United States ===
- Carmen Cali (born 1978), American baseball player
- Frank Cali (1965–2019), American mobster
- John J. Cali (1918–2014), American real estate developer
- Joseph Cali (born 1950), American actor

=== Other countries ===
- Giuseppe Calì (1846–1930), Maltese painter
- Jua Cali (born 1979), Kenyan musician

== Given name ==
=== Somalia ===
- Ali Bu'ul or Cali Bucul, a poet
- Ali Mahdi Muhammad or Cali Mahdi Maxamed, an entrepreneur and politician
- Ali Mohamed Gedi or Cali Maxamed Geedi, a past Prime Minister

=== United States ===
- Cali Carranza, a Tejano musician
- Cali Doe or Tammy Jo Alexander, a homicide victim found in the town of Caledonia, New York
- Cali Farquharson, a professional soccer player
- Cali Thornhill DeWitt or Michael Cali DeWitt, an artist

=== Other countries ===
- Cali Timmins (born 1963), a Canadian actress

== See also ==
- Cali (disambiguation)
- Cari (name)
- Carli (given name)
