= Capri (disambiguation) =

Capri is an Italian island in the Gulf of Naples.

Capri or CAPRI may also refer to:

== Arts and entertainment ==
- Capri (TV series), an Italian television series
- Capri Records, a short-lived record label based in Texas
- Capri Records (Jazz record label) founded in 1984 and currently active
- The Capris, an Italian-American doo-wop group
- The Capris (Los Angeles group), a 1960s African-American doo-wop group from Los Angeles
- The Capris (Philadelphia group), a group from Philadelphia, formed in 1953
- The Capris, a group that recorded with Doris Browne

== Ford Motor Company cars ==
- Ford Capri, a European-built automobile from 1969 through 1987, sold in the United States as the "Capri"
- Lincoln Capri, a model from the 1950s
- Mercury Capri, a version of the Ford Mustang marketed under the Mercury marque in the United States from 1979 through 1986
- Ford Capri (Australia), an Australian Ford Capri convertible, from 1989 through 1994 and sold in the United States as the Mercury Capri
- Ford Capri EV, a compact crossover SUV produced by Ford Europe with its first model year in 2024

== Business ==
- Capri (cigarette), a brand manufactured by R.J. Reynolds
- Hotel Capri, a now-closed hotel in Havana, Cuba
- Capri Cinema (Chicago), now defunct
- Capri Holdings formerly Michael Kors Holdings Limited
- Capri Sun, a brand of juice concentration drinks
- Capri Theatre, a cinema in Adelaide, South Australia
- Tiendas Capri, a Puerto Rican chain of discount department stores.

== CAPRI ==
- CAPRI model, the abbreviation for Common Agricultural Policy Regionalised Impact model, a tool for agricultural policy impact assessment
- Caribbean Policy Research Institute (CaPRI), a public policy think tank in Jamaica
- Critical Assessment of Prediction of Interactions, a protein-protein docking structure prediction experiment

== Other uses ==
- Dick Capri (1931–2024), American actor and comedian
- Joan Capri (1917-2000), a Catalan humorist and actor
- Capri (color), a tint of cyan
- Capri (horse), thoroughbred racehorse, winner of the 2017 Irish Derby
- Capri (town), the main town of the island
- Capri pants, a style of trousers
- Operation Capri (or Battle of Medenine), a German World War II counteroffensive
- An alternate spelling of Capra, the goat genus
- Capri, the Secret Service code name for Jill Biden

== People with the given name ==
- Capri Anderson (born 1988), American actress
- Capri Cafaro (born 1977), a Democratic member of the Ohio Senate
- Capri Virkkunen (born 1972), Finnish lead singer of Amberian Dawn

== See also ==
- Isle of Capri (disambiguation)
- Cari (disambiguation)
- Carpi (disambiguation)
