= Carn (disambiguation) =

Carn is a magazine produced by the Celtic League.

Carn may also refer to:

== Places ==
- Carn, Conry, a townland in Conry civil parish, barony of Rathconrath, County Westmeath, Republic of Ireland
- Carn, County Fermanagh, a townland in County Fermanagh, Northern Ireland
- Carn, County Londonderry, a townland in County Londonderry, Northern Ireland
- Carn, Foyran, a townland in Foyran civil parish, barony of Fore, County Westmeath, Republic of Ireland
- Carn (Magheraculmoney), a townland in County Fermanagh, Northern Ireland
- Carn, Mayne, a townland in Mayne civil parish, barony of Fore, County Westmeath, Republic of Ireland
- Carn, Tullyhunco, a townland in Kildallan civil parish, barony of Tullyhunco, County Cavan, Republic of Ireland

== Other uses ==
- Carn (novel),1989 novel by Irish author Patrick McCabe
- CKFG-FM, a radio station in Toronto, Ontario, Canada branded as "Caribbean African Radio Network", or CARN
- Carn (hill), a classification of Irish hills
- Carn: the name for a granite outcrop on the top of hills in (mostly) west Cornwall; in east Cornwall and on Dartmoor the granite outcrops are known as Tors

== See also ==
- Cari (disambiguation)
- Carns, a surname
