= Isle of Capri =

Isle of Capri may refer to:

- Capri, the Italian island
- Isle of Capri Casinos, an American gaming company
- "Isle of Capri" (song), a song written in 1934
- Isle of Capri, Queensland, a neighbourhood name within the Suburb of Surfers Paradise, on the Gold Coast, Queensland, Australia

== See also ==
- Capri (disambiguation)
