= Carib =

Carib may refer to:

== People and languages ==
- Kalina people, or Caribs, an Indigenous people of South America
  - Carib language, also known as Kalina, the language of the South American Caribs
- Kalinago people, or Island Caribs, an Indigenous people of the Lesser Antilles in the Caribbean
  - Kalinago language, also known as Island Carib, the language of the Island Caribs
- Cariban languages, the wider family of languages that includes Carib (but not Island Carib)
- Black Carib, Indigenous people from the island of Saint Vincent, descended from Island Caribs and Black slaves
- Garifuna people, Central American people descended from Saint Vincent's Black Caribs

== Birds ==
- Eulampis, a genus of hummingbird with the following species:
  - Green-throated carib
  - Purple-throated carib
- Carib grackle, a New World tropical blackbird

== Other uses ==
- Carib Aviation, a former airline based in Antigua and Barbuda
- Carib Brewery, a brewery headquartered in Trinidad and Tobago
- Carib Territory, a district in the Caribbean island-nation of Dominica
- Caribes de Anzoátegui, a professional baseball team from Puerto la Cruz, Venezuela
- USS Carib, several United States Navy vessels

== See also ==
- Cari (disambiguation)
- Carob
- Caribbean (disambiguation)
