= Cali (disambiguation) =

Santiago de Cali, or Cali, is the capital of the Valle del Cauca department in Colombia.

Cali may also refer to:

== Populated places ==
- Cali, an informal short form of the name of the American state of California

== Entertainment ==
- Cali (singer), stage name of French singer Bruno Caliciuria
- Cali & El Dandee, a Colombian pop duo comprising Alejandro Rengifo (Cali) and Mauricio Rengifo (Dandee)
- Cali Chronic or Cali, a single released by American rap group Harlem World
- Cali Gari, a Japanese experimental rock band

== Other uses ==
- Calì, a list of people with the surname or given Calì
- Alfonso Bonilla Aragón International Airport or Cali Airport, in Colombia
- Cali cartel, a drug cartel
- Cali River in western Colombia
- Center for Computer-Assisted Legal Instruction (CALI), a nonprofit US law school consortium

== See also ==
- Cari (disambiguation)
- Kali, a Hindu goddess
