= USS Tomich =

1942 Edsall-class destroyer escort

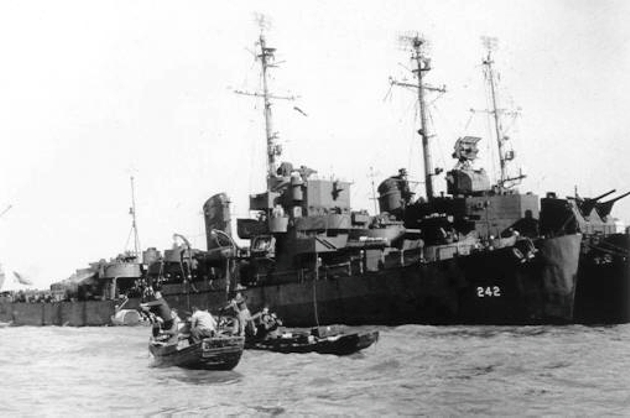

History

United States
- Namesake: Peter Tomich
- Builder: Brown Shipbuilding Houston, Texas
- Laid down: 15 September 1942
- Launched: 28 December 1942
- Commissioned: 27 July 1943
- Decommissioned: 20 September 1946
- Stricken: 1 November 1972
- Fate: Sold for scrapping 18 January 1974

General characteristics
- Class & type: Edsall-class destroyer escort
- Displacement: 1,253 tons standard; 1,590 tons full load
- Length: 306 feet (93.27 m)
- Beam: 36.58 feet (11.15 m)
- Draft: 10.42 full load feet (3.18 m)
- Propulsion: 4 FM diesel engines, 4 diesel-generators, 6,000 shp (4.5 MW), 2 screws
- Speed: 21 knots (39 km/h)
- Range: 9,100 nmi. at 12 knots; (17,000 km at 22 km/h)
- Complement: 8 officers, 201 enlisted
- Armament: 3 × single 3 in (76 mm)/50 guns; 1 × twin 40 mm AA guns; 8 × single 20 mm AA guns; 1 × triple 21 in (533 mm) torpedo tubes; 8 × depth charge projectors; 1 × depth charge projector (hedgehog); 2 × depth charge tracks

USS Tomich (DE-242) was an Edsall-class destroyer escort in service with the United States Navy from 1943 to 1946. She was scrapped in 1974.

== History ==
USS Tomich was named in honor of United States Navy Chief Watertender and Croatian Peter Tomich who received the Medal of Honor posthumously for his actions during the Japanese attack on Pearl Harbor. She was laid down on 15 September 1942 at Houston, Texas, by the Brown Shipbuilding Co.; launched on 28 December 1942; sponsored by Mrs. O. L. Hammonds; and commissioned on 27 July 1943.

=== Battle of the Atlantic ===
Following commissioning, Tomich got underway from Galveston, Texas, on 12 August and reached New Orleans, Louisiana, on the following day. The destroyer escort departed Louisiana waters on the 19th, bound for Bermuda and four weeks of shakedown training. On 23 September, Tomich, in company with USS Farquhar (DE-139), departed Bermuda and escorted USS Merrimack (AO-37) to Norfolk, Virginia, before sailing for Charleston, South Carolina, and availability.

Tomich sailed for Cuba on 9 October and further training in Caribbean waters, reaching Guantánamo Bay on the 12th. Five days later, the escort vessel rendezvoused with Army transport USAT George Washington and escorted her to Kingston, Jamaica. Tomich immediately returned to Cuba. Upon her arrival back at Guantánamo Bay later the same day, 17 October, she received orders to search for USS Dorado (SS-248) which had sailed from New London, Connecticut, on 6 October and had been expected to arrive at the Panama Canal Zone on the 14th. Tomich hunted for the missing submarine until the 22d but failed to locate any trace of it.

Six days later, the destroyer escort set course for Hampton Roads to screen USS Pike (SS-173) to Norfolk. Released from this duty on the 30th, she returned to Guantanamo Bay before heading north again and making port at Norfolk on 5 November.

Nine days later, Tomich joined the screen of Convoy UGS-24, bound for French Morocco. On 2 December, after her charges had all made port, she dropped anchor off Casablanca. Arriving in New York City on Christmas morning, 1943. after escorting Convoy GUS-24, Tomich secured alongside pier "K" of the New York Navy Yard for availability which lasted into 1944.

On 5 January 1944, Tomich departed the yard and proceeded to Block Island Sound for gunnery and antisubmarine warfare training off Montauk Point, Long Island. Five days later, the ship steamed for Norfolk, Virginia, in company with other units of Escort Division (CortDiv) 7, to join other ships of Task Force 63 in escorting Convoy UGS-30 to Casablanca. After a brief independent run to Gibraltar, where she moored alongside famed British battleship HMS Warspite, Tomich departed the British base on 4 February and rendezvoused with Convoy GUS-29 the next day.

Detached from the convoy screen on the 8th, she proceeded to the Azores, where she met SS Phoenis Banning and SS Abraham Baldwin. Rejoining GUS-29 with her two charges, Tomich continued ocean escort duties through the 17th. On the following day, the destroyer escort again received orders for independent duty and escorted USS Mattaponi (AO-41) and SS Sangara to Bermuda before returning north to the New York Navy Yard for availability commencing on 22 February.

Tomich got underway on 5 March 1944 for Bayonne, New Jersey, where she underwent deperming before proceeding to Montauk Point for refresher training. The destroyer escort sailed for Hampton Roads and arrived at Norfolk on the 11th. Two days later, she sailed for Tunisia as an escort for Convoy UGS-36.

On 30 March, the convoy passed through the Straits of Gibraltar, bound for Bizerte. During the evening watch of the 31st, Tomich homed in on a sonar contact and went to general quarters, proceeding to track down the echo. Dropping two 13-charge patterns, Tomich remained at general quarters throughout the night and instituted an antisubmarine patrol in company with HMS Black Swan. About 0401, as Tomich rejoined the screen, her lookouts spotted enemy aircraft off her port bow. Zigzagging independently on the port bow of the convoy, the destroyer escort opened fire with her entire antiaircraft battery at 0410. During the 20-minute attack, the enemy aircraft, twin-motored Ju. 88's, came in low and fast; but the heavy antiaircraft fire of the escorts drove off their attackers with no loss to themselves.

After all of her charges had reached port safely, Tomich was assigned to homeward-bound Convoy GUS-36 but detached on 13 April to proceed to Oran, Algeria, for inspection of her starboard shaft. After investigation revealed that all was in order, the ship rejoined her convoy on the 14th. She subsequently arrived at New York on 2 May and underwent availability at the navy yard before she proceeded to Casco Bay for refresher training.

Returning to Norfolk on the 20th, Tomich sailed as part of task force TF 64, escorting Convoy UGS-43 bound for Bizerte. After reaching North Africa, Tomich was detached from convoying long enough to escort USS Carib (AT-82), which was towing USS Menges (DE-320) to the Azores. When she arrived at Horta, Tomich rejoined homeward-bound Convoy GUS-43.

Availability at the New York Navy Yard in early July preceded further training exercises in Casco Bay, Maine, before the ship returned to Norfolk on 1 August to begin another round-trip escort mission with UGS-50 and GUS-50. Following another yard availability, she made a coastal convoy run from New York to Boston, Massachusetts. Then, training in Casco Bay occupied the ship into October. On the 10th, Tomich arrived at Quonset Point, Rhode Island, for special radar and antisubmarine warfare tests and exercises with USS Barracuda (SS-163) and shore-based planes from Quonset Point Naval Air Station. On the 13th, Tomich departed the area and returned to Casco Bay on the 14th for further training exercises before arriving at Norfolk on 4 November.

On 7 November, in company with the rest of CortDiv 7 and USS Core (CVE-13), Tomich got underway from the Naval Operating Base at Hampton Roads for Bermuda and antisubmarine "hunter-killer" group training. Arriving on 10 November, the group engaged in intensive exercises for the remainder of the month before returning to New York on 6 December. Tomich operated along the east coast of the United States on antisubmarine operations in the western Atlantic for the remainder of the year 1944 and into the spring of 1945.

=== Pacific Theater ===
Following an overhaul at the Boston Navy Yard in May and June, the ship steamed to the Caribbean. Departing Guantánamo Bay on 16 July 1945, she transited the Panama Canal on the 18th and arrived at San Diego, California, on the 26th. Standing out of that port on the 31st, she conducted exercises while en route to Hawaii and reached Pearl Harbor on 7 August as the war in the Pacific drew to its climax. The inexorable advance of American air and naval forces—topped by the dropping of atomic bombs on Hiroshima and Nagasaki—compelled Japan to surrender unconditionally. Meanwhile, Tomich continued training exercises in Hawaiian waters, prior to departing Pearl Harbor on 20 August, bound for the western Pacific.

Tomich made port at Saipan on 29 August before proceeding independently to the Bonins on 1 September. The destroyer escort relieved USS Helm (DD-388) on air-sea rescue station on 5 September for a five-day stint before heading for Iwo Jima and replenishment. She operated in waters between Iwo Jima, Okinawa, and Saipan for the remainder of the year 1945 and into 1946 before heading for China. She made port at Qingdao on 13 January 1946. She remained on duty in Chinese waters until 10 April when she departed Shanghai for Hawaii. Arriving at Pearl Harbor on 21 April, she proceeded via the west coast to the Panama Canal.

=== Decommissioning and fate ===
Following her arrival on the east coast, the ship underwent inactivation preparations at Charleston, South Carolina, from May through late August. Tomich then proceeded to Mayport, Florida, and arrived on 4 September. Following further inactivation procedures there, Tomich was placed out of commission, in reserve, at Green Cove Springs, Florida, on 20 September 1946. She remained there until her name was struck from the Navy list on 1 November 1972. She was scrapped in 1974.

== Awards ==
Tomich received one battle star for World War II service.

== See also ==
- Peter Tomich
