= R. L. Carns =

American football coach, athletics administrator (1886–1964)

Biographical details
- Born: May 11, 1886; Bridgeton, New Jersey, U.S.
- Died: February 21, 1964 (aged 77); Gresham, Oregon, U.S.

Playing career

Track and field
- 1904–1908: Dartmouth
- Positions: 880-yard run, relay

Coaching career (HC unless noted)

Football
- 1908: Doane

Administrative career (AD unless noted)
- c. 1910: Omaha HS (NE)

Head coaching record
- Overall: 3–4

Raymond Ledden "Pete" Carns (May 11, 1886 – February 21, 1964) was an American football coach and athletics administrator. He served as the head football coach at Doane College in Crete, Nebraska for one season, in 1908, compiling a record 3–4.

Carns was born on May 11, 1886, in Bridgeton, New Jersey. He graduated from New Britain High School in New Britain, Connecticut. Carnes attended Dartmouth College, where he was a member of the track and field team for four years, competing in the 880-yard run and relay before graduating in 1908.

Carns was the athletic director at Omaha High School in Omaha, Nebraska and for the YMCA. During World War I, he was the director of recreation for the French Army. Carns died on February 21, 1964, in Gresham, Oregon.

== Head coaching record ==
Year	Team	Overall	Conference	Standing	Bowl/playoffs
Doane Tigers (Independent) (1908)
1908	Doane	3–4			
Doane:		3–4			
Total:		3–4			
