= Central Avian Research Institute =

Indian research institute

Central Avian Research Institute of India
- Established: 2 November 1979
- Address: Central Avian Research Institute, Izatnagar, Bareilly, UP-243122
- Location: Bareilly, Uttar Pradesh, India
- Website: www.icar.org.in/cari/index.php

The Central Avian Research Institute of India (CARI) is a research institute located at Izzatnagar near Bareilly, Uttar Pradesh state, India. It studies poultry science, including avian genetics, breeding, nutrition and feed technology, and avian physiology and reproduction, for the betterment of the Indian poultry industry.

The institute was established in 1979 under the administrative control of the Indian Council of Agricultural Research (ICAR), New Delhi, and offers also education, training, and consultancy services.

== Directors of institute ==
- Dr. B. Panda (2 Nov. 1979 to 31 March 1990)
- Dr. J.N.Panda (1 April 1990 to 25 March 1992) (Acting); 26 March 1992 to 31 Aug. 1992
- Dr. P.K.Pani (Acting) (1 Sept. 1992 to 31 Jan. 1994)
- Dr. D.C.Johari (Acting) (1 Feb. 1994 to 24 Aug. 1994) (1 Dec. 1996 to 13 Oct. 1997)
- Dr. S.C. Mohapatra (25 Aug. 1994 to 30 Nov. 1996)
- Dr. Rajvir Singh (14 Oct. 1997 to 6 March 2003) (24 Oct. 2003 to 3 Oct. 2006) (10 Nov. 2006 to 3 Dec. 2006
- Dr. T.S. Johri (Acting) (7 March 2003 to 23 Oct. 2003)
- Dr. A. K. Shrivastav (Acting) (4 Oct. 2006 to 9 Nov. 2006) (4 Dec. 2006 to 18 July 2007) (1 Feb. 2010 to 7 Feb. 2010) (19 March 2011 to 12 April 2011)
- Dr. B.P. Singh (19 July 2007 to 31 Jan. 2010)
- Dr. R.P.Singh (Current)
