= Carns Cairn =

- Carn na gCarn (Irish)
- Location within Ireland
- 54.255449°N 8.450273°W
- Type: cairn
- Location: Cleveragh Road, Sligo, County Sligo, Ireland

History
- Built: c. 3000 BC

Site notes
- Elevation: 109 m (358 ft)

National monument of Ireland
- Official name: Carns Cairn
- Reference no.: 568

Carns Cairn is a cairn and National Monument located in County Sligo, Ireland.

== Location ==
Carns Cairn is located in Carns Forest between Sligo town and Lough Gill.

== History ==
The cairn is believed to date back to c. 3000 BC, the Neolithic, making it contemporaneous with Miosgán Meadhbha atop Knocknarea.

== Description ==
The cairn is a large flat-topped cairn 60 m (200 ft) by 55 m (180 ft) across and 7 m (23 ft) high.
