= ADAP2 =

Protein-coding gene in the species Homo sapiens

Identifiers
- Aliases: ADAP2, CENTA2, HSA272195, cent-b, ArfGAP with dual PH domains 2
- External IDs: OMIM: 608635; MGI: 2663075; GeneCards: ADAP2

Gene location (Human)
Chr.	Chromosome 17 (human)
Band	17q11.2	Start	30,906,344 bp
Band	17q11.2	End	30,959,322 bp

Gene location (Mouse)
Chr.	Chromosome 11 (mouse)
Band	11 B5|11 47.56 cM	Start	80,154,105 bp
Band	11 B5|11 47.56 cM	End	80,178,958 bp
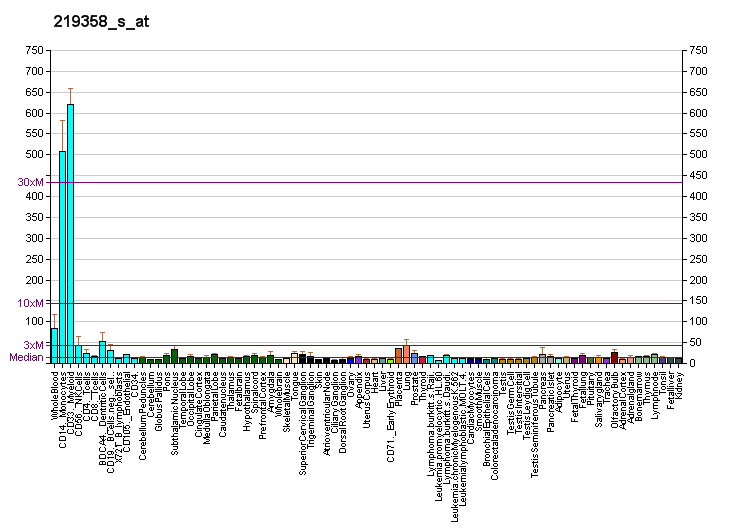
RNA expression pattern
Bgee	Human / Mouse (ortholog); Top expressed in: monocyte; synovial membrane; amniotic fluid; granulocyte; placenta; spleen; trabecular bone; gingival epithelium; blood; synovial joint / Top expressed in: Rostral migratory stream; right kidney; stroma of bone marrow; lumbar subsegment of spinal cord; left lobe of liver; human kidney; jejunum; blastocyst; duodenum; proximal tubule; More reference expression data
BioGPS	More reference expression data
Gene ontology
Molecular function	inositol 1,3,4,5 tetrakisphosphate binding; protein-macromolecule adaptor activity; phosphatidylinositol-4,5-bisphosphate binding; protein binding; phosphatidylinositol-3,4,5-trisphosphate binding; metal ion binding; GTPase activator activity; phosphatidylinositol-3,4-bisphosphate binding; phosphatidylinositol bisphosphate binding
Cellular component	cytoplasm; plasma membrane; mitochondrial envelope; membrane
Biological process	development of the heart; positive regulation of GTPase activity
Sources:Amigo / QuickGO
Orthologs
Databases	NCBI: entry; OMA: entry
Species	Human	Mouse
Entrez	55803	216991
Ensembl	ENSG00000184060	ENSMUSG00000020709
UniProt	Q9NPF8	Q8R2V5
RefSeq (mRNA)	NM_001346712; NM_001346714; NM_001346716; NM_018404	NM_172133
RefSeq (protein)	NP_001333641; NP_001333643; NP_001333645; NP_060874	NP_742145
Location (UCSC)	Chr 17: 30.91 – 30.96 Mb	Chr 11: 80.15 – 80.18 Mb
PubMed search
- Wikidata
View/Edit Human	View/Edit Mouse

Arf-GAP with dual PH domain-containing protein 2 is a protein that in humans is encoded by the ADAP2 gene.
