= USS Carib (ID-1765) =

Cargo ship of the United States Navy

History

United States
- Name: USS Carib
- Builder: Detroit Shipbuilding Company, Detroit, Michigan
- Launched: 28 October 1916
- Commissioned: 27 December 1917
- Decommissioned: 27 January 1919
- Stricken: 27 January 1919
- Fate: Returned to owner, 27 January 1919

General characteristics
- Type: Cargo ship
- Displacement: 3,800 long tons (3,861 t)
- Length: 251 ft (77 m)
- Beam: 43 ft 6 in (13.26 m)
- Draft: 18 ft 3 in (5.56 m)
- Armament: 1 × 5 in (130 mm) gun; 1 × 3 in (76 mm) gun

USS Carib (No. 1765), a converted commercial cargo ship, was acquired by the United States Navy for use during World War I. She served the Navy by performing routine cargo duties, and she served the U.S. Army in carrying supplies to the American Expeditionary Forces in Europe.

== Acquisition by the U.S. Navy ==
Carib, a cargo ship, was built in 1916 by Detroit Shipbuilding Company, in Detroit, Michigan; converted by Norfolk Shipbuilding and Dry Dock Company, Norfolk, Virginia; commissioned on 27 December 1917 and reported to the Naval Overseas Transportation Service.

== World War I North Atlantic Operations ==
Between 29 January and 16 April 1918, Carib made three voyages between Hampton Roads, Virginia, and Halifax, Nova Scotia, carrying coal for United States ships performing convoy duty in the western Atlantic. She sailed in convoy from New York on 10 May, loaded with general cargo and petroleum products. After discharging her cargo at Gibraltar, Bizerte, Malta, and Corfu, Carib returned to Hampton Roads on 20 August.

Clearing Hampton Roads on 6 September 1918 with a cargo of mines and general supplies for the force engaged in laying the North Sea Mine Barrage, Carib arrived in Corpach, Scotland, on 28 September.

== On loan to the U.S. Army ==
She returned to Hampton Roads on 31 October, was transferred to the U.S. Army account, and until 5 January 1919, she carried cargo for the Army of Occupation to Nantes, France.

== Decommissioning ==
She was decommissioned and returned to her former owner at Hoboken, New Jersey, on 27 January 1919.
