= USS Carib (AT-82) =

Tugboat of the United States Navy

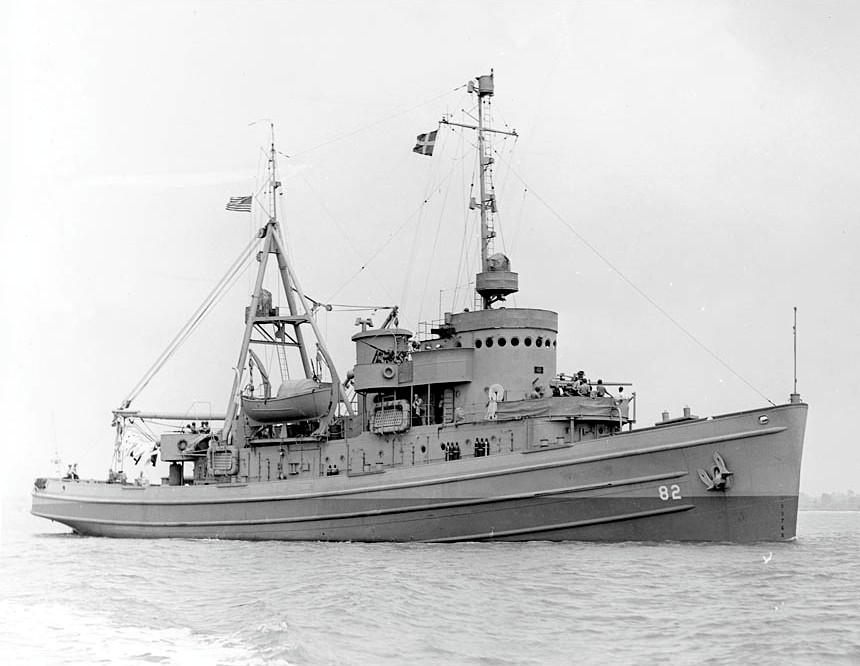
- Carib underway near Charleston Navy Yard in July 1943

History

United States
- Name: USS Carib
- Namesake: Carib
- Builder: Charleston Shipbuilding and Dry Dock Co., Charleston, South Carolina
- Launched: 7 February 1943
- Commissioned: 24 July 1943
- Decommissioned: 24 January 1947
- Reclassified: ATF-82, 15 May 1944
- Stricken: 1 July 1963
- Fate: Sold to Colombia, 14 February 1978

Colombia
- Name: ARC Pedro de Heredia
- Namesake: Pedro de Heredia
- Acquired: 14 February 1978
- Fate: Sunk by the Colombian Navy, June 2007

General characteristics
- Class & type: Cherokee-class fleet tug
- Displacement: 1,235 long tons (1,255 t)
- Length: 205 ft (62 m)
- Beam: 38 ft 6 in (11.73 m)
- Draft: 15 ft 4 in (4.67 m)
- Propulsion: Diesel-electric; 4 × General Motors 12-278A diesel engines driving 4 General Electric generators and 3 General Motors 3-268A auxiliary services engines; single screw; 3,600 shp (2,685 kW)
- Speed: 16 knots (30 km/h; 18 mph)
- Complement: 85 officers and enlisted
- Armament: 1 × single 3"/50 caliber gun; 2 × twin 40 mm AA guns; 2 × single 20 mm AA guns

USS Carib (AT-82) was a Cherokee-class fleet tug constructed for the United States Navy during World War II. Her purpose was to aid ships, usually by towing, on the high seas or in combat or post-combat areas, plus "other duties as assigned." She served in the Atlantic Ocean and the Pacific Ocean.

The second U.S. Navy ship to be named Carib, she was launched 7 February 1943 by Charleston Shipbuilding and Dry Dock Co., Charleston, South Carolina; sponsored by Mrs. N. R. Wade; and commissioned 24 July 1943.

== World War II Atlantic Ocean operations ==
Carib cleared Norfolk, Virginia, 3 September 1943 for duty under Commander, Service Force, Atlantic. She arrived at Recife, Brazil, 17 October, and through June 1944 operated along the coast of Brazil on local escort, towing and salvage duty. This important support aided in the successful antisubmarine and escort operations of the South Atlantic Force.

== Transfer to the Pacific Ocean ==
Clearing for the Mediterranean 6 June 1944, Carib returned to New York 22 July, towing the battle-damaged destroyer escort Menges (DE-320) across the Atlantic. Through the next year, she aided in the development of anti-submarine equipment at Quonset Point, Rhode Island, and at Port Everglades, Florida. The fleet tug cleared Port Everglades on 1 June 1945 for the Pacific, towing barracks craft (non-self propelled) APL-28 to the Panama Canal Zone, and then the 10,000-ton concrete floating drydock ARDC-2 to Pearl Harbor.

Carib towed battle rafts to Eniwetok and Okinawa, and at Buckner Bay on 21 October reported to the U.S. 5th Fleet's Service Squadron 10. Towing jobs in support of the occupation of Japan and redeployments in China took Carib to Japan and Shanghai from Okinawa until 9 January 1946. The tug towed stores ship E.A. Poe (IX-103) to Subic Bay, Philippine Islands, arriving 6 February, and operated in the Philippines until 6 April.

== Post-war decommissioning ==
Carib returned to San Pedro, California, 29 May, and on 24 January 1947 was placed out of commission in reserve, berthed at San Diego, California. She was struck from the Naval Register, 1 July 1963, and sold to Colombia, under the Security Assistance Program, 14 February 1978 and renamed ARC Pedro de Heredia. Final Disposition was to be sunk by the Colombian Navy in June 2007.

== Colombian Navy ==
In March 1979 in Alameda, California, the unit was reactivated in the shipyard Tod Shipyard with the first Colombian crew, the first sea test was on 30 July 1979, and the official day of incorporation to the Colombian Navy was 7 August 1979, the last commanding officer was The Master Chief Rafael Darío Valverde Burgos.

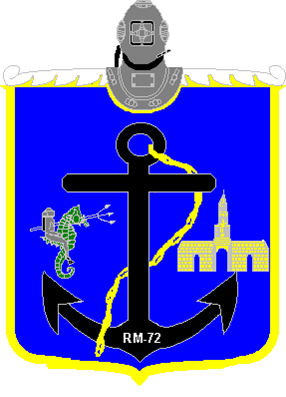
Seal for the ARC Pedro de Heredia in the Colombian Navy
