= Cari Internet =

Malaysian internet company

Cari Internet Sdn. Bhd. is a Malaysian company founded in 1996. It operates the eponymous website Cari.com.my, the country's first search engine and web portal, along with online florist Flowers.com.my and web hosting service Onnet. Cari Forum, a multilingual internet forum, is a particularly popular portion of its website.

The word cari (IPA: /tʃari/) means "search" in the Malay language.

== Business development ==
Cari was founded by Liew Chew-Keat (Chinese: 柳树吉). It was unique for its early provision of trilingual services: English, Malay, and Chinese. After its founding, Cari grew to become one of the country's top ten web portals, while maintaining tight control over costs. It received RM2.5 million (US$657,808) in venture capital funding from AKN.com in 2000 in exchange for a 15% stake, which was later transferred to Swansoft Technologies. The bursting of the dot-com bubble actually aided Cari's cash flow, allowing it to cut advertising spending from RM450,000 in 2000, to just RM50,000 in 2001. However, it was still not profitable in 2001.

In 2003, Cari Internet announced the rollout of its in-house developed electronic commerce platform, which partnered with local payment system Commerce Payment Sdn. Bhd. In 2008, it announced a partnership with local restaurant search startup FoodStreet, founded by local technologist and foodie Aidan Lee.

== Legal disputes ==
In 2000, Cari Internet had a legal dispute with Catcha.com and considered suing the latter for copyright infringement. In 2008, Cari Internet was taken to court over postings made in its forum which allegedly defamed a manager of the Malaysian Chinese newspaper Kwong Wah Yit Poh. Cari had refused to answer three letters from the manager alleging defamation and demanding that Cari disclose the identities of the posters who made the comments. The High Court at George Town ordered Cari to disclose the requested information and pay court costs for the complainant.

== Traffic and rankings ==
According to Alexa Internet's rankings, cari.com.my was the 144th-most popular website among Malaysia's 74.6% visitors in March 2018.
