= Pina Calì =

Italian painter (1905–1949)

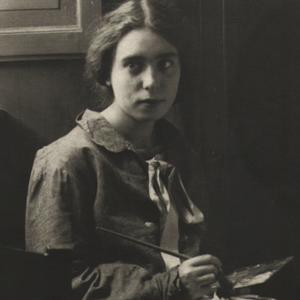
- Born: 2 December 1905; Casteldaccia, Italy
- Died: 3 June 1949 (aged 43); Palermo, Italy
- Occupation: Painter
- Spouse: Silvestre Cuffaro
- Children: 2

Pina Calì (2 December 1905 – 3 June 1949) was an Italian painter who was born and died in Sicily.

== Life ==
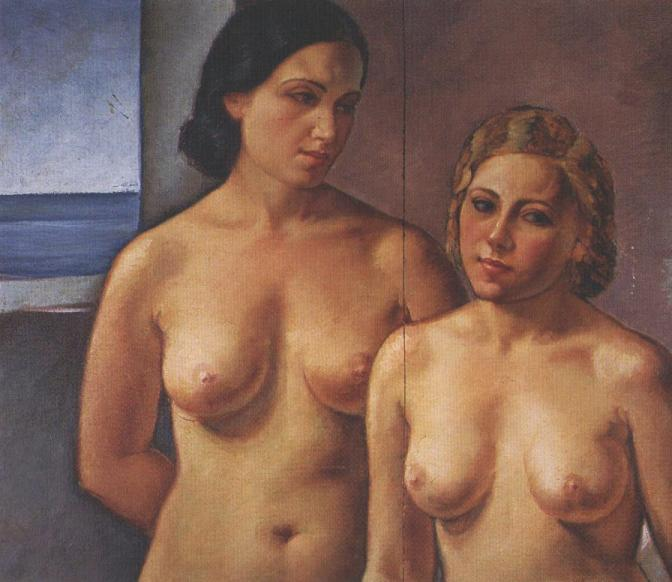
Pina Calì, Women

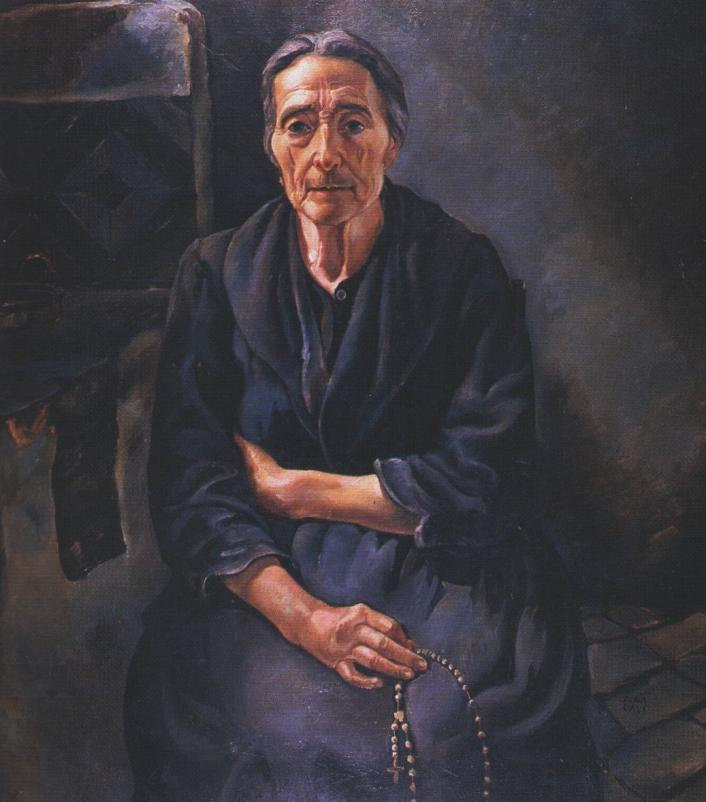
Pina Calì, A life

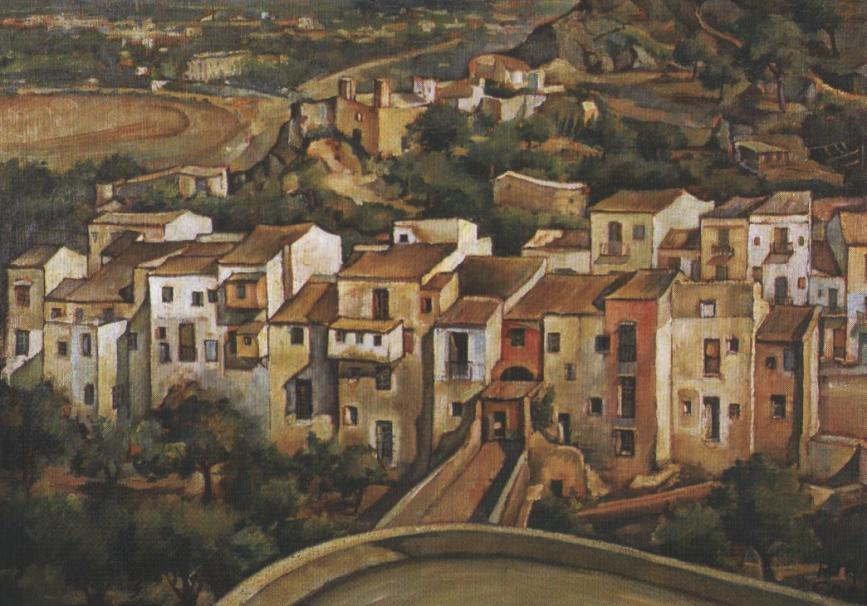
Pina Calì, Boccadifalco

Calì was born in Casteldaccia, Italy in 1905. She took to painting at the age of fifteen. She did not attend an art college but she received some lessons from the painter Onofrio Tomaselli. By 1926 her paintings were in the "Exhibition of young Sicilian painters" shown locally in Palermo and in Rome. She appeared in another joint exhibition in 1930 and the following year she had her first solo exhibition. The paintings included still life paintings, self portrait paintings and a noted painting of two naked women.

In 1937 she married Silvestre Cuffaro, a sculptor and they were an artistic team. Cuffaro was also a professor at Accademia di Belle Arti di Palermo.

Calì died in 1949 at the age of 43 in Palermo after a long illness. Her illness had reduced her artistic production at the end of her life. She was known for painting seated figures and her husband would return to this theme in his sculpture. She and her husband were given a joint retrospective exhibition in 2005 at Villa Cattolica di Bagheria.
