= Peter Tomich =

US Navy Medal of Honor recipient (1893–1941)

Peter Tomich Petar Herceg 'Tonić'
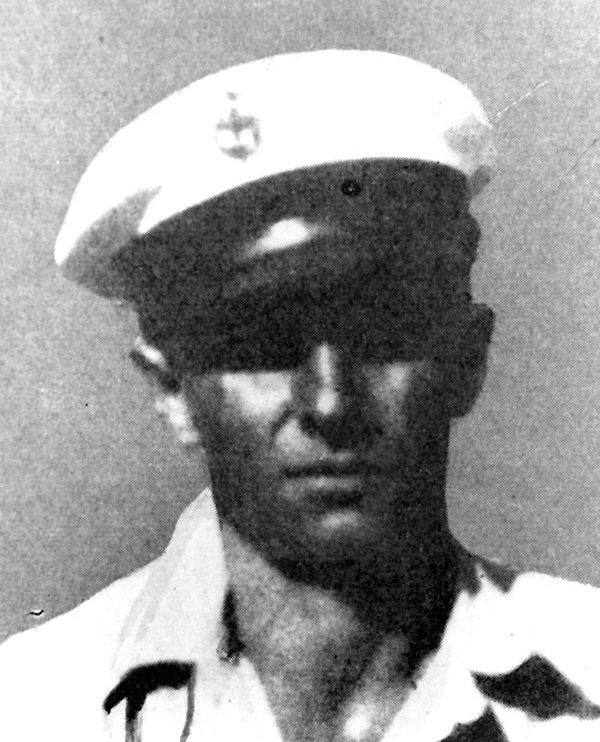
- Chief Watertender Peter Tomich
- Born: June 3, 1893; Prolog, Ljubuški, Bosnia and Herzegovina, Austria-Hungary
- Died: December 7, 1941 (aged 48); Pearl Harbor, Territory of Hawaii
- Military career
- Allegiance: United States of America
- Branch: United States Army; United States Navy
- Service years: 1917–1919 (Army); 1919–1941 (Navy)
- Rank: Chief Watertender (Navy)
- Units: USS Litchfield (DD-336); USS Utah (BB-31)
- Conflicts: World War I World War II: Attack on Pearl Harbor †
- Awards: Medal of Honor

Petar Herceg 'Tonić' (later anglicized as Peter Tomich; June 3, 1893 – December 7, 1941) was a United States Navy sailor of Herzegovinian Croat descent who received the United States military's highest award, the Medal of Honor, for his actions in World War II.

== Biography ==
Tomich was an ethnic Croat from Herzegovina born as Petar Herceg (family nickname 'Tonić') in Prolog near Ljubuški, under Austro-Hungarian rule in Bosnia and Herzegovina. He immigrated to the United States in 1913 and joined the US Army in 1917.

=== World War I ===
Tomich served in the US Army during World War I and enlisted in the US Navy in 1919, where he initially served on the destroyer USS Litchfield (DD-336).

=== World War II ===
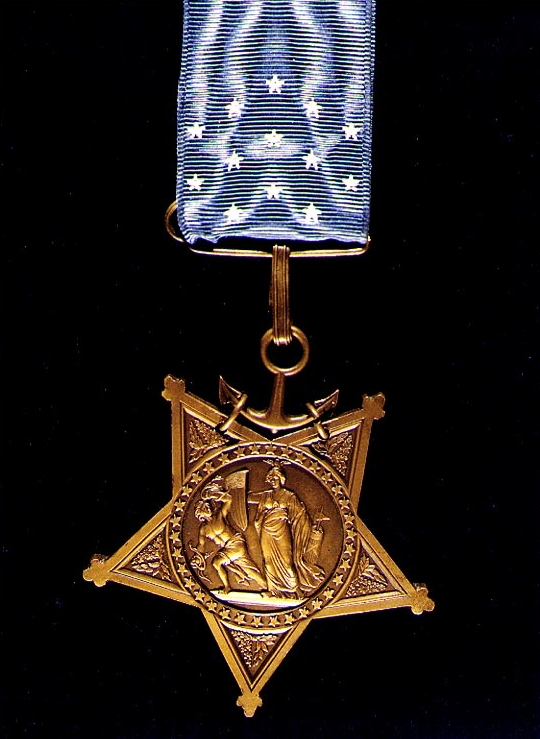
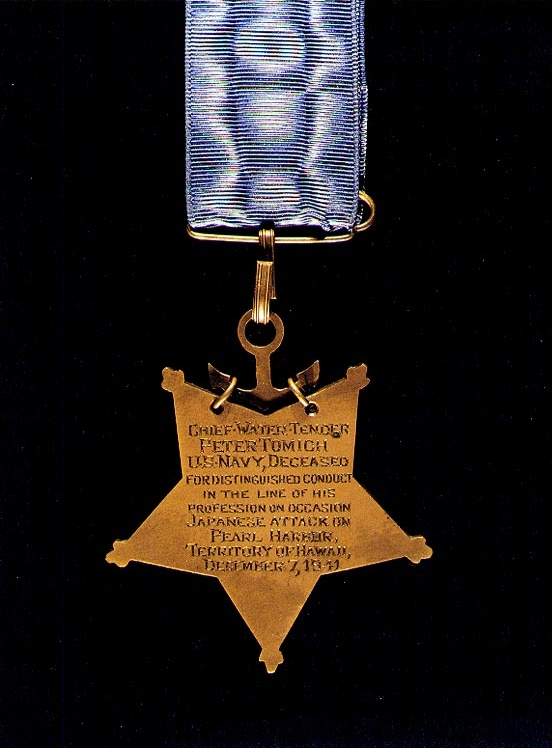
Petar Tomich's Medal of Honor, awarded by US President Franklin D. Roosevelt.

By 1941, he had become a chief watertender on board the training and target ship USS Utah. On December 7, 1941, while the ship lay in Pearl Harbor, moored off Ford Island, she was torpedoed during Japan's raid on Pearl Harbor. Tomich was on duty in a boiler room. As Utah began to capsize, he remained below, securing the boilers and making certain that other men escaped, and so lost his life. For his "distinguished conduct and extraordinary courage" at that time, he posthumously received the Medal of Honor. His Medal of Honor was on display at the Navy's Senior Enlisted Academy (Tomich Hall). Later, the decoration was presented to Tomich's family on the aircraft carrier USS Enterprise in the southern Adriatic city of Split in Croatia, on 18 May 2006, sixty-four years after US President Franklin D. Roosevelt awarded it to him.

== Awards and honors ==

Medal of Honor
| Purple Heart | Navy Good Conduct Medal | World War I Victory Medal |
| American Defense Service Medal with Fleet clasp | Asiatic-Pacific Campaign Medal with Campaign star | World War II Victory Medal |

=== Medal of Honor citation ===
For distinguished conduct in the line of his profession and extraordinary courage and disregard of his own safety during the attack on the Fleet in Pearl Harbor by the Japanese forces on 7 December 1941. Despite realizing that the ship was capsizing as a result of enemy bombing and torpedoing, Tomich remained at his post in the engineering plant of the U.S.S. Utah until he saw that all boilers were secured and all fireroom personnel had left their stations, and by so doing, lost his own life."

=== Legacy ===
- The destroyer escort USS Tomich (DE-242), 1943–1974, was named in honor of Chief Watertender Tomich.
- The United States Navy Senior Enlisted Academy in Newport, RI is named Tomich Hall in honor of Chief Watertender Tomich.
- The Steam Propulsion Training Facility at Service School Command Great Lakes is named in honor of Chief Watertender Tomich.
- The U.S. Citizenship and Immigration Services Headquarters Conference Room in Washington, D.C., is named the Peter Tomich Conference Center.

== See also ==
- List of Medal of Honor recipients

== Bibliography ==
- Hagan, John (2004). Chief Petty Officer's Guide. Annapolis: Naval Institute Press. ISBN 1-59114-459-0.
