= CariPac =

The Caribbean and Pacific Consortium (CariPac), established 2005, consists of institutions of higher education in Guam, the Northern Mariana Islands, American Samoa, Puerto Rico, the U.S. Virgin Islands, the Federated States of Micronesia, the Marshall Islands, and Palau. CariPac was established to bring needed funds into agriculture and food science programs. Congressional response has included added telemetry for food science missions.
