= Agricultural Development in the American Pacific =

ADAP Project Logo

The Agricultural Development in the American Pacific (ADAP) Project was formally organized by the five directors of the Land Grant institutions in Hawaii and the United States-affiliated Pacific Islands (USAPI) in 1988, with the deans/directors of the Land Grant institutions serving as the Board of Directors. The purpose of ADAP is to strengthen existing Land Grant programs by sharing and focusing resources on priority areas of common concern and interest. Priority areas are often unique to the Pacific region, having to do with tropical/subtropical island agriculture and cultural practices.

Due to the unique natural and human resource base of the Pacific island agro-ecosystems, it is often not possible or appropriate to transfer results from temperate zone agricultural research, and materials for extension and teaching used by continental US Land Grant programs. ADAP supports applied research within the region, and the development of effective extension materials that are culturally appropriate.

ADAP represents a partnership of the University of Hawaii, American Samoa Community College, College of Micronesia, Northern Marianas College, and the University of Guam.
