= Carrie (name) =

Carrie is a female given name in English speaking countries, usually a pet form of Caroline or Carolyn. Other spellings include Cari, Kari, Karie, Kerry, Carri, Karri, Kerrie, Kerri, Keri, Cerry, and Karrie, as well as various other spellings. Related names may include Carol, Caroline, Carolyn, Carolyne, or Carolynne.

It is also a surname.

== Given name ==
- Carrie A. Buck (born 1971), American educator and politician
- Carrie A. Tuggle (1858–1924), American educator, philanthropist, and social activist
- Carrie Acheson (1934–2023), Irish Fianna Fáil politician
- Carrie Adeline Barbour (1861–1942), American paleontologist, educator, assistant curator, and assistant professor
- Carrie Adell Strahorn (1854–1925), American explorer and pioneer
- Carrie Akre (born 1966), American musician who worked with bands Hammerbox and Goodness (band)
- Carrie Allen McCray (1913–2008), African-American writer
- Carrie Ann Baade (born 1974), American painter
- Carrie Ann Inaba (born 1968), American dancer, choreographer, television dance competition judge, actress, game show host, and singer
- Carrie Ann Lucas (1971–2019), American lawyer, disability rights advocate, and activist
- Carrie-Ann McLaren, Canadian candidate in the Green Party 2008 Canadian federal election
- Carrie Ann Rois, American victim of convicted serial killer Gary Ridgway
- Carrie-Anne Moss (born 1967), Canadian actress
- Carrie Anne Philbin, English author and teacher of computer science
- Carrie Asai, American author of Samurai Girl (book series)
- Carrie Astor Wilson (1861–1948), American heiress and social leader
- Carrie Austin (born 1949), American politician
- Carrie B. Grover (1879–1959), Canadian folk singer, fiddler, and folk song collector
- Carrie B. Wilson Adams (1858/1859-1940), American choral conductor, composer, and pianist
- Carrie Babcock Sherman (1856–1931), American wife of U.S. Vice President James S. Sherman
- Carrie Baird, American chef and businesswoman
- Carrie Banks, American basketball player and coach
- Carrie Barefoot Dickerson (1917–2006), American activist
- Carrie Barth, American politician
- Carrie Barton (born 1976), American synchronized swimmer
- Carrie Bearden, American psychologist and academic
- Carrie Bebris, American author, journalist, and novelist
- Carrie Beck, American film and television executive
- Carrie Berk (born 2002), American writer, blogger, activist, and actress
- Carrie Best (1903–2001), Canadian journalist and social activist
- Carrie Bethel (1898–1974), Native American basket weaver
- Carrie Bickmore (born 1980), Australian talk show host and television- and radio presenter
- Carrie Black, several people
- Carrie Bowman (1887–1971), American stage actress
- Carrie Borzillo (born 1970), American music- and entertainment journalist and author
- Carrie Bradley, American violinist and vocalist
- Carrie Brown, several people
- Carrie Brownstein (born 1974), American musician, writer, actress, and comedian
- Carrie Buck (1906–1983), American eugenic
- Carrie Burpee Shaw (1850–1946), American composer, music educator, and pianist
- Carrie Butler, American former member of indie rock band Eagle Seagull
- Carrie C. Holly (1866–1943), American politician
- Carrie Cabelka, American political advisor
- Carrie Campbell Severino (born 1976/1977), American lawyer and political activist
- Carrie Carlton (1834–1868), American poet, writer, journalist
- Carrie Chapman Catt (1859–1947), American women's suffrage leader
- Carrie Chase Davis (1863–1953), American physician and suffragist
- Carrie Clark Ward (1862–1926), American silent film actress
- Carrie Coon (born 1981), American actress
- Carrie Cornplanter (1887–1918), Native American artist
- Carrie Coyner, American politician
- Carrie Cracknell (born 1980), British theater director
- Carrie Crowley (born 1964), Irish actress and former radio- and television presenter
- Carrie Cunningham (born 1972), American former professional tennis player
- Carrie Cutter (1840–1862), American nurse
- Carrie Daniels, several people
- Carrie Daumery (1863–1938), Dutch-born American film actress
- Carrie Davis (born 1976), British sports TV broadcaster
- Carrie De Mar (1875/1876-1963), American actress, singer, and vaudevillian
- Carrie Delahunt (born 1981), Canadian curler
- Carrie DelRosso (born c. 1976), American politician and businesswoman
- Carrie Derick (1862–1941), Canadian botanist, geneticist, professor, and founder of McGill University's genetics department
- Carrie Dew (born 1986), American former WPS player
- Carrie Diaz Eaton (born 1981), American associate professor of digital and computational studies
- Carrie Dimoff (born 1983), American athlete
- Carrie Dobro (born 1957), American actress
- Carrie Dodd (born 1974), American professional beach volleyball player
- Carrie Donovan (1928–2001), American fashion editor
- Carrie E. Bullock (c. 1887 – 1962), American nurse
- Carrie Elkin (born 1973), American folk/country singer and musician
- Carrie Englert (born 1957), American gymnast and Olympic competitor
- Carrie Enwright, American 1963 Playboy model
- Carrie Etter (born 1969), American poet
- Carrie Everson (1842–1914), American metallurgist and inventor who patented processes for extracting metals from ore
- Carrie Farnsworth Fowle (1854–1917), Turkish-born American missionary
- Carrie Figdor, American associate professor of philosophy
- Carrie Finlay, Canadian actress
- Carrie Fisher (1956–2016), American actress, writer, producer, and humorist
- Carrie Fleming (born 1957), American former professional tennis player
- Carrie Flemmer (born 1967), Canadian softball player
- Carrie Fountain, American poet and writer of young adult fiction
- Carrie Fulton Phillips (1873–1960), American mistress of U.S. President Warren G. Harding
- Carrie G. Stevens (1882–1970), American fly fisher and fly lure tier
- Carrie Genzel (born 1971), Canadian actress, producer, and writer
- Carrie Gerlach Cecil, American writer, television show producer, public speaker, and businesswoman
- Carrie Goldberg (born 1976/1977), American lawyer
- Carrie Gracie (born 1962), Scottish journalist and newsreader
- Carrie Graf (born 1967), Australian WNBL- and WNBA coach and former player
- Carrie Grant (born 1965), English vocal coach, television presenter, and session singer
- Carrie H. Thomas (died 1930), African-American physician
- Carrie Hall (1874–1963), American nurse
- Carrie Hamblen, American politician and former broadcast journalist
- Carrie Hamilton (1963–2002), American actress, singer, and playwright
- Carrie Hawks, American director, artist, animator, and designer
- Carrie Hessler-Radelet, American former Peace Corps director
- Carrie Hope Fletcher (born 1992), English actress, singer-songwriter, author, and Internet personality
- Carrie Hott, American interdisciplinary artist, researcher, and educator
- Carrie Howe (born 1981), American sailor
- Carrie Hudek Chiuso, American victim in the Lane Bryant shooting
- Carrie Ichikawa Jenkins, Canadian philosopher and professor
- Carrie Imler, American ballet dancer
- Carrie Ingalls (1870–1946), sister of Laura Ingalls Wilder
- Carrie Isaac, American politician
- Carrie Jacobs-Bond (1862–1946), American singer, pianist, and songwriter
- Carrie Jane Sutton Brooks (1899–1964), African-American pioneering medical doctor and surgeon
- Carrie Jean Yazel, American actress and 1991 Playboy model
- Carrie Jenkins Harris, several people
- Carrie Johnson (disambiguation), several people
- Carrie Johnston, American voice actor and writer
- Carrie Jones, several people
- Carrie Judd Montgomery (1858–1946), American editor, philanthropist, preacher, faith healer, evangelist, radical evangelical, and writer
- Carrie Kabak, English-born American author and production designer
- Carrie Keagan (born 1980), American television personality, actress, writer, and producer
- Carrie Kei Heim (born 1973), American lawyer, writer, and former child actress
- Carrie Kemper (born 1984), American television writer
- Carrie Keranen, American voice actress, production manager, producer, and voice director
- Carrie Kirkman (born 1962/1963), Australian-born Canadian business executive
- Carrie Koelker (born 1970), American politician
- Carrie Kveton (born 1980), American soccer player
- Carrie L. Byington, Mexican-American clinician and pediatric infectious disease specialist
- Carrie L. Hoyt (1866–1950), American lawyer, politician, and mayor
- Carrie L. Partch (born 1973), American protein biochemist and circadian biologist
- Carrie Lam (born 1957), Hong Kong government administrator and current chief executive
- Carrie Lam (actress) (born 1980), Hong Kong television presenter and actress
- Carrie Langston Hughes (1873–1938), American writer, actress, and mother to poet, playwright, and social activist Langston Hughes
- Carrie Lawrence (born 1997), American NWSL player
- Carrie Lazenby (1882–1996), American supercentenarian
- Carrie Lee, American Miss Minnesota USA contestant in 2005
- Carrie Lee Jenkins, Canadian criminal on Masterminds (Canadian TV series)
- Carrie Lee Riggins, American ballerina, actress, and contestant on Worst Cooks in America
- Carrie Lee Sze Kei (born 1985), Malaysian actress, model, and businesswoman
- Carrie Lester (born 1981), Australian triathlete
- Carrie Lightbound (born 1979), Canadian sprint kayaker
- Carrie Lingo (born 1979), American field hockey player
- Carrie Longton (born 1965), British technology company founder and former television producer
- Carrie Lougee Broughton (1879–1957), American librarian
- Carrie Lucas (born 1945), American R&B singer
- Carrie Lukas (born 1973), American political writer
- Carrie-Lynn Cohen (born 1967), Canadian former professional tennis player
- Carrie-Lynn Neales, Canadian television-, film-, and stage actress and writer
- Carrie M. McLain (1895–1973), American writer
- Carrie M. Shoaff (1849–1939), American artist, author, potter, playwright, and correspondent
- Carrie Mac (born 1975), Canadian author
- Carrie MacEwen (born 1958), British ophthalmology consultant
- Carrie Mae Weems (born 1953), American photographer and artist
- Carrie Manfrino (born 1959), American oceanographer
- Carrie Manolakos (born 1984), American singer-songwriter and musical theater actress
- Carrie Marcus Neiman (1883–1953), American businesswoman and one of the cofounders of Neiman Marcus
- Carrie McCabe, American investor, business builder, and chief executive
- Carrie McLaren, American founder of non-profit magazine Stay Free!
- Carrie McNinch, American past member of gothic rock duo Geko
- Carrie Meek (1926–2021), American politician
- Carrie Melbourne, English former member of rock band Babylon Zoo
- Carrie Menkel-Meadow (born 1949), American lawyer and scholar of dispute resolution
- Carrie Messner (born 1977), American long-distance runner
- Carrie Meyer (born 1955), American former professional tennis player
- Carrie Moore (1882–1956), Australian actress
- Carrie Moore (basketball) (born 1985), American former basketball player and current head coach
- Carrie Moore (soccer) (born 1978), American retired soccer player
- Carrie Morgridge (born 1967), American philanthropist and author
- Carrie Morrison (1888–1950), English lawyer and solicitor
- Carrie Moyer (born 1960), American painter and writer
- Carrie Munn (1898–1984), American fashion designer
- Carrie N. Baker, American lawyer and professor
- Carrie Nahabedian (born 1958), American chef
- Carrie Nation (1846–1911), American temperance advocate
- Carrie Neely (1877/1878-1938), American tennis player
- Carrie Newcomer, American singer, songwriter, and author
- Carrie Ng (born 1963), Hong Kong actress
- Carrie Nugent (born 1984), American assistant professor of computational physics and planetary science
- Carrie Nuttall, American former wife of musician Neil Peart
- Carrie Nye (1936–2006), American stage- and film actress
- Carrie Obendorfer Simon (1872–1961), Jewish-American communal leader
- Carrie Oeding (born 1978), American poet
- Carrie Olver (born 1967), Canadian TV personality
- Carrie Perrodo (born 1950/1951), Hong Kong-born French billionaire heiress and businesswoman
- Carrie Prejean (born 1987), American model and former beauty pageant titleholder
- Carrie Preston (born 1967), American actress, producer, and director
- Carrie Pringle (1859–1930), Austrian-born British soprano singer
- Carrie Quigley (born 1970), Australian sport shooter
- Carrie Quinlan, British actress, comedy writer, and journalist
- Carrie Radison, American 1957 Playboy model
- Carrie B. Raymond, American musician and educator
- Carrie Rebora Barratt (born 1960), American art historian
- Carrie Reichardt, English contemporary artist
- Carrie Renfrew (c. 1858 – 1948), American writer
- Carrie Rentschler, Canadian scholar of feminist media studies and associate professor
- Carrie Reynolds (19th- to early 20th century), American stage actress
- Carrie Rheingans, American politician from Michigan
- Carrie Ricci, American attorney and retired army lieutenant colonel
- Carrie Richerson (1952–2019), American science fiction fan, writer, and bookseller
- Carrie Rickey (born 1952), American feminist and art- and film critic
- Carrie Rodriguez (born 1978), American singer-songwriter
- Carrie Rose (born 1993), British entrepreneur
- Carrie Rozelle (1937–2007), Canadian-born American disabilities activist
- Carrie Rugh (born c. 1961), American former competitive figure skater
- Carrie Russell (born 1990), Jamaican track and field sprinter and bobsledder
- Carrie Ruud (born 1952), American politician
- Carrie Savage (born 1980), American theater-, film-, TV-, and voice actress
- Carrie Saxon Perry (1931–2018), American politician
- Carrie Schneider (born 1979), American visual artist
- Carrie Schofield-Broadbent, American Episcopal bishop
- Carrie Schopf (born 1957), American-born Armenian dressage rider
- Carrie Schreiner (born 1998), German racing driver
- Carrie Scott (born 1979), American/English curator, director, TV presenter, and art writer
- Carrie Semmelroth, American politician and academic
- Carrie Serwetnyk (born 1965), Canadian former soccer player
- Carrie Sheads, American Civil War nurse and educator
- Carrie Sheffield, American columnist, broadcaster, and policy analyst
- Carrie Sheinberg (born 1972), American former alpine skier
- Carrie Bell Sinclair (1839–1883), American poet
- Carrie Smith (1925–2012), American blues and jazz singer
- Carrie Smith (sailor) (born 1995), Australian sportswoman and competitive sailor
- Carrie Snodgress (1945–2004), American actress
- Carrie Snow (born 1953), American stand-up comedian, writer, author, and host
- Carrie Snowden (died 1948), American switchboard operator
- Carrie Snyder, Canadian writer
- Carrie Sorensen, American politician
- Carrie Southworth (born 1990), American actress, model, and businesswoman
- Carrie Staley (English footballer), English former footballer
- Carrie Steele Logan (c. 1829 – 1900), American philanthropist
- Carrie Steinseifer (born 1968), American former competition swimmer and Olympian
- Carrie Stevens (born 1969), American model, actress, and entrepreneur
- Carrie Stevens Walter (1846–1907), American educator and poet
- Carrie Stroup (born 1982), American fashion model, TV host, and beauty pageant titleholder
- Carrie Sweetser (1863–1952), American watercolorist and amateur botanist
- Carrie Swidecki, American teacher and dance game world record holder
- Carrie Tan (born 1982), Singaporean politician
- Carrie Tergin (born 1972), American former politician
- Carrie Thomas Alexander-Bahrenberg (1861–1929), American civic and political activist
- Carrie Thomas Jordan (1870–1968), American educator and civil rights activist
- Carrie Tiffany (born 1965), English-born Australian novelist and former park ranger
- Carrie Tollefson (born 1977), American former middle-distance runner
- Carrie Tolstedt, American banking executive
- Carrie Tubb (1876–1976), English soprano and music teacher
- Carrie Turner, several people
- Carrie Underwood (born 1983), American country music singer, songwriter, and actress
- Carrie Vaughn (born 1973), American writer
- Carrie W. Colburn (c. 1859 – 1932), American theater- and silent film actress and playwright
- Carrie Walton Penner (born 1970), American granddaughter of Walmart founder Sam Walton
- Carrie Ward, several people
- Carrie Wassenaar, American producer of What If...? (TV series)
- Carrie Watson Fleming (1844–1931), American wife of politician Aretas B. Fleming
- Carrie Weaver, American author of contemporary romance novels
- Carrie Westcott, American 1993 Playboy model
- Carrie Westlake Whitney (1854–1934), American librarian
- Carrie White (disambiguation), several people
- Carrie Williams (c. 1866 – 1930), African-American educator
- Carrie Williams Clifford (1862–1934), American author and activist
- Carrie Willmott (born 1975), British swimmer
- Carrie Woerner (born 1962), American politician
- Carrie Wolf, American former air force officer and judge advocate
- Carrie Wolinetz, American biologist
- Carrie Wong (born 1994), Singaporean actress
- Carrie Worthley (born 1983), Australian netball player
- Carrie Yau (born 1955), Hong Kong former government official

== Surname ==
- Alex Carrie, Scottish footballer
- Colin Carrie (born 1962), Canadian politician and Member of Parliament
- T. J. Carrie (born 1990), American National Football League player

== Fictional characters ==
- Carrie, in the animated series The Ridonculous Race
- Carrie, in the comic book series Nemesis: Reloaded
- Carrie Allen, in the TV series Tru Calling, played by Liz Vassey
- Carrie Bendis, in the American TV drama 24, played by Danielle Burgio
- Carrie Black (OITNB), in Orange Is the New Black, played by Lea DeLaria
- Carrie Bradshaw, in the HBO sitcom Sex and the City, The CW series The Carrie Diaries, and Max series And Just Like That... played by Sarah Jessica Parker and AnnaSophia Robb
- Carrie Brady, in the NBC soap opera Days of Our Lives, played by Andrea Barber, Christie Clark, and Tracy Middendorf
- Carrie Burton, in the New Zealand soap opera Shortland Street, played by Lisa Crittenden
- Carrie Clark, in the Australian soap opera Neighbours, played by Vanessa Rossini
- Cupid (DC Comics), or "Carrie Cutter", in Arrow (TV series), played by Amy Gumenick
- Carrie Dunlop, in the BBC soap opera EastEnders, played by Nicola Wainwight
- Carrie Fernandez, in the 1999 video game Castlevania 64
- Carrie Heffernan, from the American sitcom The King of Queens, played by Leah Remini
- Carrie Kelley, in Frank Miller's graphic novels Batman: The Dark Knight Returns and its sequel Batman: The Dark Knight Strikes Again
- Carrie Krueger, in The Amazing World of Gumball
- Carrie Mark, in the web series Petscop
- Carrie Mathison, in the American political TV show Homeland, played by Claire Danes
- Carrie Miller, in the teen drama TV series Whistler, played by Amanda Crew
- Carrie Murtaugh, in the 1987 American buddy cop action movie Lethal Weapon, played by Ebonie Smith
- Carrie Nicholls, in the ITV soap opera Emmerdale, played by Linda Lusardi
- Carrie Owen, in the Channel 4 soap opera Hollyoaks, played by Jaq Croft
- Carrie Sharples, in the TV series Alice, played by Martha Raye
- Carrie Swann, in the soap opera EastEnders, played by Holly Atkins
- Carrie Turner (character), in the American TV drama 24, played by Lourdes Benedicto
- Carrie Wade, in the British medical soap opera Doctors, played by Sarah Ovens
- Carrie White, title character and protagonist of Stephen King's novel Carrie
- Carrie Wilson, in Netflix's Julie and the Phantoms

== See also ==
- Carlie
- Carree (name)
- Carrie (disambiguation)
- Carey (disambiguation)
- Carry (disambiguation)
- Cary (disambiguation)
- Carie Graves
- Karrie
