= Worthley =

Worthley is a surname. Notable people with the surname include:

- Carrie Worthley (born 1983), Australian netball player
- Jean Worthley (1925–2017), American naturalist, TV host, and author
- Rebecca Worthley (born 1981), British singer-songwriter
