= Carrie Anne (name) =

Carrie Anne or Carrie-Anne is a blended name combining Carrie and Anne that is an English feminine given name derived from the names Karl and Hannah. Notable people referred to by this name include the following:

== Given name ==
- Carrie Ann Inaba (born 1968), American television personality
- Carrie-Anne Moss (born 1967), Canadian actress
- Carrie Anne Philbin, English teacher of computer science and author
- Carrie Anne Savage, known as Carrie Savage, American voice actress

== Fictional character ==
- Carrie Anne Mathison, known as Carrie Mathison, Claire Danes' Homeland character

== See also ==
- Carrie Ann
