= Fowle =

Fowle is a surname, and may refer to:

- Bruce Fowle, American architect
- Carrie Farnsworth Fowle (1854–1917), American missionary
- Daniel Fowle (printer) (c. 1715–1787), American printer
- Daniel Gould Fowle (1831–1891), governor of North Carolina
- Helen Whitaker Fowle (1869–1948), First Lady of North Carolina
- E Percy Fowle
- Steven Fowle, newspaper proprietor
- Susannah Fowle (born 1958), Australian actress
- Thomas Fowle (c. 1530 – after 1597), English clergyman
- William H. Fowle (1838–1903), American politician from Virginia
- Zechariah Fowle (printer) (1724–1776), American printer
