= Carrie Ann =

Carrie Ann or Carrie-Ann is a blended name combining Carrie and Ann that is an English feminine given name derived from the names Karl and Hannah. Notable people referred to by this name include the following:

== Given name ==
- Carrie Ann Baade (born Louisiana), American painter
- Carrie Ann Lucas (1971 – 2019), American lawyer, disability rights advocate, and activist

== See also ==
- Carrie Anne (name)
