= Carrie White (disambiguation) =

Carrie White is the title character of Stephen King's 1974 horror novel Carrie and its adaptations.

Carrie White may also refer to:

- Carrie White (hairdresser) (20th–21st century), American hairdresser

== See also ==
- Clarrie White, footballer
- Kerry White, politician
