= Muli (TV series) =

2007 Philippine television drama series

- Also known as: In Love Again
- Genre: Romantic drama
- Created by: Don Michael Perez
- Directed by: Mac Alejandre
- Starring: Alfred Vargas; Carrie Lee Sze Kei; Marian Rivera
- Theme music composer: Vehnee Saturno
- Opening theme: "Muli" by Janno Gibbs
- Countries of origin: Philippines; Malaysia
- Original languages: Tagalog; Malay
- No. of episodes: 63

Production
- Executive producer: Camille Gomba-Montaño
- Camera setup: Multiple-camera setup
- Running time: 45 minutes
- Production companies: GMA Entertainment TV; RTM; Cre-Asian Productions

Original release
- Network: GMA Network; TV1
- Release: February 19 – May 18, 2007

Muli (transl. again / international title: In Love Again) is a 2007 Philippine-Malaysian television drama romance series broadcast by GMA Network and TV1. Directed by Mac Alejandre, it stars Alfred Vargas, Carrie Lee and Marian Rivera. It premiered on February 19, 2007 on GMA Network's Dramarama sa Hapon line up. The series concluded on May 18, 2007, with a total of 63 episodes.

== Cast and characters ==
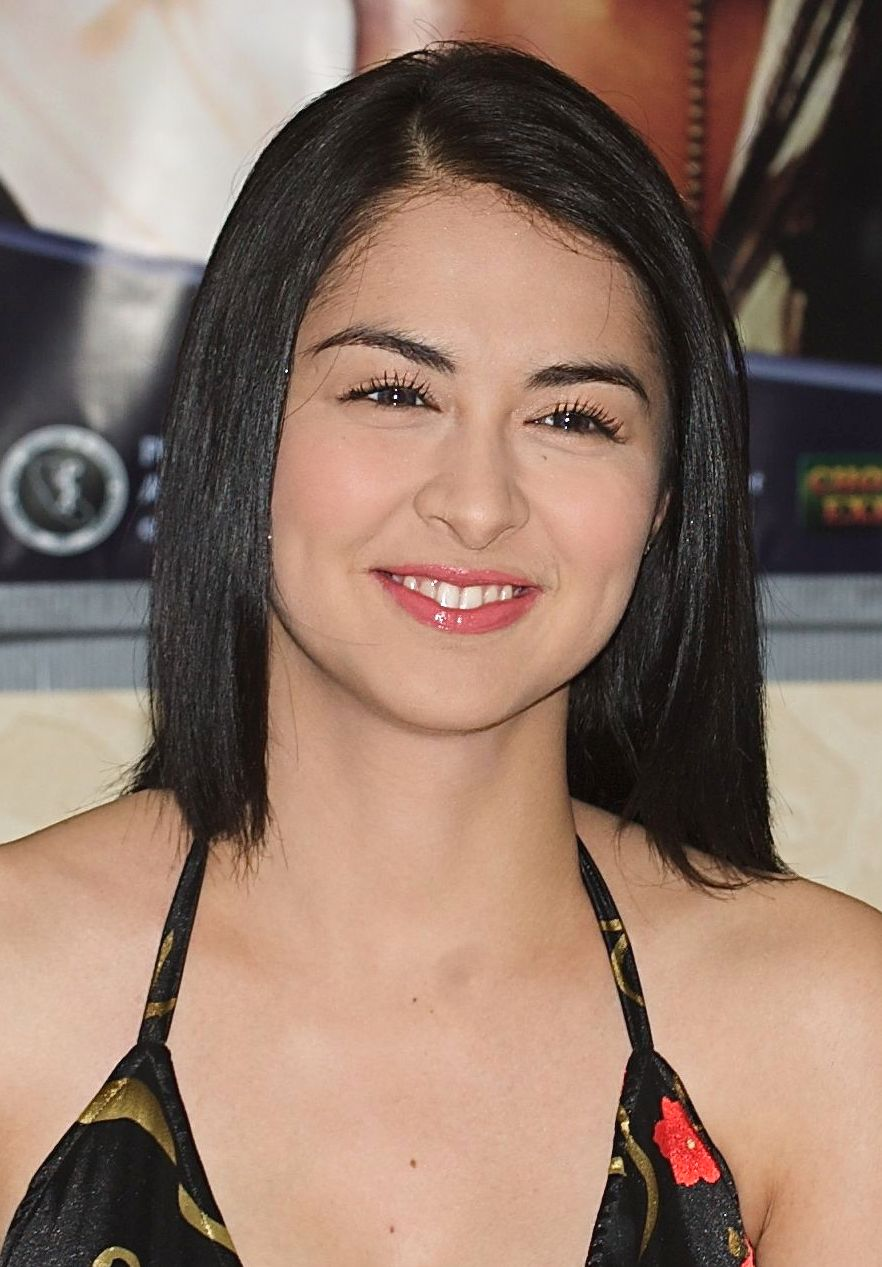
Marian Rivera portrays Raquel Estadilla.

Lead cast

- Alfred Vargas as Lukas Estadilla
- Carrie Lee Sze Kei as Cheryl
- Marian Rivera as Racquel Estadilla

Supporting cast

- Tony Eusoff as Zul
- Victor Neri as Jaime
- Odette Khan as Aunt Ason
- Daniel Tan as Lim Soon-Huat
- Alicia Mayer as Ria
- Gabby Eigenmann as Alvin
- Renz Valerio as Joshua
- Ailyn Luna as Michelle
- Vaness del Moral as Rose

== Accolades ==
Accolades received by Muli
| Year | Award | Category | Recipient | Result | Ref. |
|---|---|---|---|---|---|
| 2007 | 21st PMPC Star Awards for Television | Best Daytime Drama Series | Muli | Nominated | |
