= Carrie Ward =

Carrie Ward may refer to:

- Carrie Clark Ward (1862–1926), American actress
- Carrie Halsell Ward (1903–1989), Oregon State University's first African-American graduate
