= Lisa Ryckbosch =

Current position
- Title: Assistant coach
- Team: DePaul

Biographical details
- Education: Loyola University Chicago, B.S., 1984

Playing career
- 1980–1984: Loyola (IL)

Coaching career (HC unless noted)
- 1990–1991: UIC (assistant)
- 1991–2002: Depaul (assistant 1991–2001, associate head coach 2001–2002)
- 2002–2011: UIC
- 2017–present: DePaul (assistant)

Head coaching record
- Overall: 128–139 (.479)
- Tournaments: 0–1 (WNIT)

Accomplishments and honors

Records
- Most Wins as a UIC Women's Basketball Coach; Loyola University Chicago Athletics Hall of Fame

Lisa Ryckbosch is a current assistant coach for the DePaul Blue Demons. She previously served as the head coach of the UIC Flames women's basketball team from 2002 to 2011 and holds the record for most wins in UIC women's basketball history. In her fifth season as head coach, the Flames made their first post-season appearance in the WNIT following their best-ever finish in the Horizon League. Upon completion of the 2010–11 season, her record with the flames was 128–139. Ryckbosch came to UIC after eleven seasons as an assistant coach at Depaul, from 1991 until 2002, and one season as an assistant coach at UIC from 1990 to 1991. Ryckbosch graduated from Loyola in 1984 after starting for the Ramblers for four years and serving as a team captain for two seasons, and in 2006 was inducted in Loyola's Athletics Hall of Fame. After graduation she began her coaching career at Hillcrest High School in Country Club Hills, Illinois, where she served as the Head Girls' Varsity Basketball Coach and a math teacher for three years.

== Head coaching record ==
Record table
Season	Team	Overall	Conference	Standing	Postseason
UIC Flames (Horizon League) (2002–2011)
2002–03	UIC	17–11	11–5	T–2nd	
2003–04	UIC	12–16	6–10	T–6th	
2004–05	UIC	14–15	10–6	4th	
2005–06	UIC	16–14	10–6	3rd	
2006–07	UIC	19–13	11–5	T–2nd	WNIT First Round
2007–08	UIC	10–20	6–12	8th	
2008–09	UIC	14–16	8–10	6th	
2009–10	UIC	12–18	9–9	T–5th	
2010–11	UIC	14–16	9–9	T–5th	
UIC:		128–139 (.479)	80–72 (.526)		
Total:		128–139 (.479)			
National champion Postseason invitational champion Conference regular season champion Conference regular season and conference tournament champion Division regular season champion Division regular season and conference tournament champion Conference tournament champion
