= Carrie Daniels =

Carrie Daniels may refer to:

- Carrie Savage (born 1980), or Carrie Daniels, American theatre, film, and TV actress, who is mostly known for her work as a voice actress
- Carrie Daniels (basketball) (born 1972), American college basketball coach
