= Carrie Daniels (basketball) =

American basketball coach

Current position
- Title: Head coach
- Team: Clarksville Academy

Biographical details
- Born: November 25, 1972 (age 53); Scottsburg, Indiana, U.S.

Playing career
- 1992–1996: Austin Peay
- Position: Guard

Coaching career (HC unless noted)
- 1996–1999: UNLV (asst.)
- 1999–2006: Western Kentucky (asst.)
- 2006–2015: Austin Peay
- 2015–present: Clarksville Academy

Carrie Lynn Daniels (née Thompson; born November 25, 1972) is an American college basketball coach and the former women's head coach at Austin Peay State University (APSU).

== Early life and education ==
A native of Scottsburg, Indiana, Carrie Lynn Thompson attended Austin Peay after earning All-American honors as a senior at Scottsburg High School. At APSU, she starred on its first team to qualify for the NCAA women's basketball tournament in 1996. That season, she was awarded APSU's Joy Award, which is presented annually to the university's top athlete. She was presented the 1995 Wilma Rudolph Award, given by the National Association of Academic Advisors for Athletics to "...honor student athletes who have overcome great personal, academic, and/or emotional odds to achieve academic success while participating in intercollegiate athletics..." after missing most of the 1995–96 with a heart ailment. She earned her bachelor's degree from Austin Peay in 1996 and a master's degree in education from the University of Nevada, Las Vegas (UNLV) in 1999. She is married to Billy Daniels, who played for the APSU men's basketball team during the time she was playing on the women's team. They have one son, Dalton.

== Coaching career ==
Following her graduation from APSU, Daniels spent three years on the coaching staff of the women's basketball program at UNLV, serving as assistant coach to LaDonna Wilson-McClain, then as director of basketball operations to Regina Miller. She then was an assistant to three different head coaches during a seven-year stint at Western Kentucky University. On June 16, 2006, Daniels was named head coach of her alma mater. In her first six seasons, she led her teams to two OVC tournament titles and subsequent appearances in the NCAA tournament. With the first tournament title, she became the first APSU graduate to coach one of its teams into an NCAA tournament; with the second, she was the first APSU coach to qualify for an NCAA appearance twice. On March 9, 2015, APSU declined to renew Daniels' contract. Eight days later, Clarksville Academy hired Carrie Daniels as the new head girls' basketball coach.

== Head coaching record ==
Record table
Season	Team	Overall	Conference	Standing	Postseason
Austin Peay Lady Govs (Ohio Valley Conference) (2006–2015)
2006–07	Austin Peay	10–20	9–11	T–8th	
2007–08	Austin Peay	6–23	3–17	10th	
2008–09	Austin Peay	17–16	10–8	T–5th	NCAA First Round
2009–10	Austin Peay	15–18	11–7	3rd	NCAA First Round
2010–11	Austin Peay	15–18	12–6	5th	
2011–12	Austin Peay	9–22	5–11	T–8th	
2012–13	Austin Peay	7–21	2–14	6th (West)	
2013–14	Austin Peay	12–18	6–10	5th (West)	
2014–15	Austin Peay	10–20	7–9	T–7th	
Total:		101–176			
National champion Postseason invitational champion Conference regular season champion Conference regular season and conference tournament champion Division regular season champion Division regular season and conference tournament champion Conference tournament champion

== Austin Peay statistics ==
Ratios
Year	Team	GP	FG%	3P%	FT%	RBG	APG	BPG	SPG	PPG
1991–92	Austin Peay	21	37.4%	34.0%	78.6%	4.14	3.48	0.00	1.67	9.24
1992–93	Austin Peay	26	41.2%	35.7%	79.0%	5.77	3.46	0.08	2.58	15.35
1993–94	Austin Peay	2	33.3%	25.0%	100.0%	2.00	0.00	0.00	1.00	7.50
1994–95	Austin Peay	27	37.0%	26.2%	70.6%	3.59	3.52	0.07	1.96	7.85
1995–96	Austin Peay	29	33.7%	33.3%	73.7%	3.62	2.24	0.00	2.00	10.28
Career		105	37.4%	32.7%	76.5%	4.22	3.08	0.04	2.05	10.65

Totals
Year	Team	GP	FG	FGA	3P	3PA	FT	FTA	REB	A	BK	ST	PTS
1991–92	Austin Peay	21	67	179	16	47	44	56	87	73	0	35	194
1992–93	Austin Peay	26	133	323	35	98	98	124	150	90	2	67	399
1993–94	Austin Peay	2	4	12	1	4	6	6	4	0	0	2	15
1994–95	Austin Peay	27	80	216	16	61	36	51	97	95	2	53	212
1995–96	Austin Peay	29	98	291	29	87	73	99	105	65	0	58	298
Career		105	382	1021	97	297	257	336	443	323	4	215	1118
