= Carrie White (hairdresser) =

American hairdresser (1943–2022)

Carrie Enwright White
- Born: Carole Enwright; August 25, 1943; Beverly Hills, California, U.S.
- Died: May 3, 2022 (aged 78); Los Angeles, California, U.S.
- Occupations: Hairdresser, Author
- Known for: First Lady of Hairdressing

Carole Enwright White (née Enwright; August 25, 1943 – May 3, 2022) was an American hairdresser, author, and spokesperson. She was known as the "First Lady of Hairdressing," who styled Jennifer Jones, Betsy Bloomingdale, Elizabeth Taylor, Goldie Hawn, Camille Cosby, Ann-Margret, Elvis Presley, Sharon Tate, Brad Pitt, and Sandra Bullock, among others.

White collaborated with Richard Avedon on shoots for Vogue, and her work appeared in Harper's Bazaar, InStyle, Allure, Vanity Fair, Ladies' Home Journal, Mademoiselle, and Glamour. She was credited as technical advisor on the 1975 film Shampoo and, in 2011, she published her internationally bestselling autobiography, Upper Cut: Highlights of My Hollywood Life. In 2021 Upper Cut began development as a feature film starring Julia Fox.

== Early life and education ==
Carrie White was born as Carole Enwright, on Burton Way in Beverly Hills. Her family moved to Pacoima, California when she was seven, and moved back to Hollywood when she was fifteen. At Hollywood High, she studied art with June Hardwood and drama with John Engle and Martin Landau. After graduating high school, she supported herself while pursuing a Cosmetology degree by working at Bob's Big Boy, modeling hats downtown in the garment district, and trying out for Playboy; she was selected as Playmate of the Month in July 1963.

== Career ==
White began her hairdressing career in 1964, in Beverly Hills, working with Billy Grimes. James Galanos recommended her to Jennifer Jones. Through this connection, White took over George Masters's clientele, which included Nancy Reagan, Betsy Bloomingdale, and the wives of Hollywood society, including television and film stars.

She appeared as herself on television on To Tell the Truth, in 1968.

Upon the recommendation of hairdresser Mr. Kenneth, in New York, clients, such as Betty Furness, started seeing White. On the recommendation of hairdresser Alexandre de Paris, Ursula Andress and Capucine went to White, when they were visiting Hollywood.

In 1967 photographer Melvin Sokolsky commissioned White to act as hairdresser for Yardley commercials shot in London, with Jean Shrimpton, and India, with Donna Mitchell. From 1967 to 1977, White did American beauty product television commercials, as well as platform shows for Revlon and Clairol, on such stages as Century Plaza Ballroom and the Hollywood Palladium.

Film credentials include Model Shop, styling Anouk Aimée, The Goodbye Girl, styling Marsha Mason, Alice Doesn't Live Here Anymore, styling Ellen Burstyn, One Flew Over the Cuckoos Nest, styling Louise Fletcher, Dollars, styling Goldie Hawn, Being There, styling Peter Sellers, Coma, styling Geneviève Bujold; she was technical advisor on Shampoo, working with her clients, actors Warren Beatty, Julie Christie, and Goldie Hawn, and writer Robert Towne. She has also styled Elvis Presley, Marlon Brando, Nancy Reagan, Michael Crichton; more recently, she hair colored Brad Pitt, and for seven years styled Sandra Bullock. George Hamilton remained a client from 1970, among many others frequenting her Beverly Hills salon, which opened in 2005.

She has appeared for Dewey Nicks in GQ, modeling, on separate occasions, with Foo Fighters and Jon Favreau. She has been in a Target commercial and a commercial for Fantastic Sams. For ten years she sold Tova Borgnine haircare products on QVC.

Carrie was also an author. She self-published poetry booklets and authored at least one children's book, Why a Hairy Me?, which is unpublished. In addition, she collaborated with her fiancé Alex Holt on a Bildungsroman horror novel called Disposable Teens, which has not yet been published but is being shopped for a limited television series.

== Personal life and death ==
White's childhood was extremely challenging, and saw her abandoned, experiencing alcoholism within her family and enduring sexual abuse. Her young adulthood was also problematic; married three times and with five children before she was 29, she herself suffered alcohol and drug addictions. Recovering from her addictions, White began a new business in Beverley Hills in 2005. She died from cancer on May 3, 2022.

== Honors ==
- Scholarship to Chouinard Art Institute
- Friendly House Extraordinary Service Award
- Writers in Treatment Experience, Strength and Hope Award
