= Eagle*Seagull (album) =

Studio album by Eagle*Seagull
- Released: October 11, 2005
- Genre: Indie rock
- Length: 55:40
- Label: Paper Garden
- Producer: Ian Aeillo

Eagle*Seagull's self-titled debut album was released in October 11, 2005 on Paper Garden Records. The album was recorded in a basement by Ian Aiello. HearNebraska writer Zach Zlomke writes the album has, "lush soundscapes and epic, stadium-sized build-ups quickly garnered attention."

== Track listing ==
All tracks by Eli Mardock except where noted.

1. "Lock and Key" – 6:23
2. "Photograph" – 6:10
3. "Hello, Never" (Idt, Mardock) – 3:40
4. "Death Could Be at the Door" (Mardock, Mike Overfield) – 3:59
5. "It was a Lovely Parade" – 1:35
6. "Holy" – 5:11
7. "Your Beauty is a Knife I Turn On My Throat" – 5:45
8. "It's So Sexy" – 7:01
9. "Last Song" – 4:56
10. "Heal It/Feel It" (Ian Aeillo, Mardock) – 4:12
11. "Ballet or Art" – 6:46

== Personnel ==
- Ian Aeillo – bass, guitar, engineer, mixing
- Britt Hayes – drums
- J.J. Idt – banjo, guitar
- Tim Jensen – drums
- Eli Mardock – guitar, keyboards, vocals
- Mike Overfield – bass
- Austin Skiles – guitar, vocals
