= UIC Flames women's basketball =

UIC Flames
2026–27 UIC Flames women's basketball team
- University: University of Illinois Chicago
- Head coach: Ashleen Bracey (5th season)
- Location: Chicago, Illinois
- Arena: Credit Union 1 Arena (capacity: 6,958)
- Conference: Missouri Valley Conference
- Nickname: Flames
- Colors: Navy blue and fire engine red

Uniforms
Home	Away	Alternate

The UIC Flames women's basketball team represents the University of Illinois Chicago basketball team for women in Chicago, Illinois, United States. The school's team currently competes in the Missouri Valley Conference, having joined in 2022. Previously, they played in the Horizon League from 1994 to 2022.

== History ==
UIC has (as of the end of the 2015–16 season) an all-time record of 823–951, with a 421–621 record in Division I play. The Flames have never reached the NCAA Tournament, but they have reached the WNIT in 2007 and the WBI in 2014, winning the WBI title that year.

Season	Record	Coach
1971–72	1–6	Linda James
1972–73	3–6	Pat DeBennedeto
1973–74	4–4	Linda Bain
1974–75	7–8	Mary Kay Walsh
1975–76	10–8	Mary Kay Walsh
1976–77	16–8	Mary Kay Walsh
1977–78	16–6	Mary Kay Walsh
1978–79	9–14	Louis & Claudia Prete
1979–80	17–10	Louis & Claudia Prete
1980–81	13–16	Louis & Claudia Prete
1981–82	14–13	Louis & Claudia Prete
1982–83	4–24	Barbara Edwards
1983–84	8–20	Barbara Edwards
1984–85	12–16	Barbara Edwards
1985–86	12–16	Barbara Edwards
1986–87	5–22	Barbara Edwards
1987–88	2–26	Francine St. Clair
1988–89	5–23	Francine St. Clair
1989–90	2–26	Francine St. Clair
1990–91	9–19	Eileen McMahon
1991–92	6–22	Eileen McMahon
1992–93	15–13	Eileen McMahon
1993–94	12–16	Eileen McMahon
1994–95	15–12	Eileen McMahon
1995–96	17–14	Eileen McMahon
1996–97	8–19	Eileen McMahon
1997–98	7–20	Eileen McMahon
1998–99	5–22	Tim Eatman
1999-00	14–15	Tim Eatman
2000–01	10–19	Tim Eatman
2001–02	15–15	Tim Eatman
2002–03	17–11	Lisa Ryckbosch
2003–04	12–16	Lisa Ryckbosch
2004–05	14–15	Lisa Ryckbosch
2005–06	16–14	Lisa Ryckbosch
2006–07	19–13	Lisa Ryckbosch
2007–08	10–20	Lisa Ryckbosch
2008–09	14–16	Lisa Ryckbosch
2009–10	12–18	Lisa Ryckbosch
2010–11	14–16	Lisa Ryckbosch
2011–12	18–13	Regina Miller
2012–13	9–21	Regina Miller
2013–14	26–9	Regina Miller
2014–15	16–14	Regina Miller
2015–16	12–18	Regina Miller
2016–17	6–25	Regina Miller
2017–18	8–22	Tasha Pointer
2018–19	3–26	Tasha Pointer
2019–20	3–27	Tasha Pointer
2020–21	3–16	Tasha Pointer
2021–22	2-25	Tasha Pointer
2022–23	19-17	Ashleen Bracey
2023–24	18-16	Ashleen Bracey
2024-25	15-18	Ashleen Bracey

== Postseason ==
=== Women's National Invitation Tournament ===
The Flames have appeared in the Women's National Invitation Tournament twice. They have a record of 0-2.

Year	Round	Opponent	Result
2007	First Round	Minnesota	L 54-97
2024	First Round	Southern Indiana	L 64-69

=== Women's Basketball Invitational ===
The Flames have appeared in the Women's Basketball Invitational twice. They were champions of the WBI in 2014. They have a record of 5-2.

Year	Round	Opponent	Result
2014	First Round; Quarterfinals; Semifinals; Championship Game	IPFW; Eastern Michigan; Fairfield; Stephen F. Austin	W 84-71; W 93-91; W 74-44; W 73-64
2023	First Round; Consolation; 7th Place Game	New Mexico State; FIU; North Dakota	L 41-51; L 65-68; W 76-73
