= Carrie Diaz Eaton =

Latinx mathematician

- Born: 1981; 45 years ago
- Education: University of Maine; University of Tennessee
- Known for: QUBES (Quantitative Undergraduate Biology Education and Synthesis); Math Mamas
- Awards: 2020 John Jungck Prize for Excellence in Education of the Society for Mathematical Biology
- Scientific career
- Fields: Mathematics education; Mathematical biology
- Workplaces: Bates College
- Doctoral advisor: Sergey Gavrilets

Carrie Diaz Eaton is an associate professor of digital and computational studies at Bates College, a co-founder of QUBES (Quantitative Undergraduate Biology Education and Synthesis), and project director for Math Mamas. Diaz Eaton is a 1st generation Latina of Peruvian descent and White American and is also known for her work in social justice in STEM higher education.

Diaz Eaton currently serves as the chair for the committee for minority participation in mathematics for the Mathematical Association of America (MAA), on the editorial boards of PRIMUS: Problems, Resources, and Issues in Mathematics Undergraduate Studies and CourseSource, and is an MAA Values Leader. She has also served as the past program chair and electronic communications chair of BIO SIGMAA, as Education Subgroup Chair for the Society for Mathematical Biology, and for the Editorial Board for Letters in Biomathematics.

== Education ==
Diaz Eaton received a Bachelor of Arts in mathematics with honors and a minor in zoology in 2002 from the University of Maine, Orono. In 2004, she earned a Master of Arts in mathematics with concentration in interdisciplinary mathematics from the same institution. She received her Ph.D. in mathematics with a concentration in mathematical ecology and evolutionary theory at the University of Tennessee, Knoxville in 2013, with advisor Sergey Gavrilets.

== Career ==
While working towards her Ph.D. and shortly thereafter, Diaz Eaton held several positions at the University of Tennessee, and at Eastern Maine Community College, the College of the Atlantic, and Unity College in Maine.

Diaz Eaton has been an associate professor of digital and computational studies at Bates College in Lewiston, Maine since 2018. She is the director of Partnerships and Communications and one of the co-founders of National Science Foundation-funded QUBES, a community of mathematics and biology educators aimed at teaching students how to use quantitative tools to tackle real, complex, biological problems. She is the current chair of the Mathematical Association of America (MAA) Committee on Minority Participation in Mathematics and ex officio member of the Council on the Profession. For the year 2019-2020 she is the Past Chair of the Education Subgroup of the Society for Mathematical Biology.

Diaz Eaton is also the project director for Math Mamas, a digital narrative project which lead to a special issue of the Journal of Humanistic Mathematics in 2018 (of which she was one of the editors). She is also the project director for SCORE, a network which promotes an open and inclusive biology education. Her undergraduate course "Calling Bull with R," teaches students to identify and call out misinformation and has been chosen as one of the 2020 Science Education for New Civic Engagements and Responsibilities (SENCER) Model Course.

Diaz Eaton was formerly associate professor of Mathematics in the Center for Biodiversity at Unity College. There she worked on network perspectives of coevolution and consequences for sustainability. Since then, she has developed a research program in undergraduate interdisciplinary mathematics education, with an emphasis on networks, and is the QUBES Director of Partnerships (Quantitative Undergraduate Biology Education and Synthesis). Diaz Eaton is also the project director for Math Mamas, a digital narrative project and SCORE, a network which promotes an open and inclusive biology education.

After Abigail Thompson published op-eds concerning diversity statements in The Wall Street Journal and the Notices of the American Mathematical Society in 2019, Diaz Eaton participated in the widespread responses. Thompson argued that high achievement in fostering diversity should not be a strict requirement for all newly-hired mathematics professors, as appeared to be happening at some universities; Diaz Eaton was a coauthor and signatory to a response arguing that Thompson's letter should have been barred from publication and telling students that their diversity is valued, one of many published response letters. She was interviewed for an article on the controversy, and published an analysis of the demographics of signatories of the response letters.

== Funding ==
Diaz Eaton has received numerous large grants to fund her work on equity and sustainability in mathematical biology education, including:

- Lead PI in Hewlett Foundation grant for proposal titled "Bates College/QUBES/SCORE: Supporting a more equitable and sustainable open education in undergraduate biology," US $380,210, April 2020 - March 2021.
- Co-PI for NSF grant titled "IUSE Collaborative Grant: QUBES: Quantitative Undergraduate Biology Education and Synthesis," over US $1.1 million, September 2014 - August 2021.
- Co-PI for NSF grant titled "RCN-UBE Incubator Network: Open and Accessible Biology Education: The promise of equity and the challenge of sustainability," US $74,290, August 2019 - August 2021.
- NSF INCLUDES Conference grant titled "Bringing Conversations on Diversity and Inclusion in Data Science to the Ecological and Environmental Sciences," US $232,110, July 2018 - June 2021.

== Awards, fellowships, and honors ==
- Winner of the 2020 John Jungck Prize for Excellence in Education of the Society for Mathematical Biology.
- Diaz Eaton has been chosen in 2019 as an MAA Leader and is part of MAA Math Values.
- 2018 Fellow of the Society for the Advancement of Chicanos/Hispanics and Native Americans in Science (SACNAS) Linton-Poodry Leadership Institute.
- MAA Project NExT Fellow in 2012/2013 (silver dot).
- Mark A. Musik Doctoral Scholars Fellow from the Southern Regional Education Board between 2005 and 2008 while she was a graduate student at the University of Tennessee.
- Diaz Eaton was part of the Massachusetts A Team which placed first in the American Regions Mathematics League International Competition in 1998.

== Editorial work ==
Diaz Eaton was part of the editorial board of Letters in Biomathematics between 2013 and 2017. She has been part of the PRIMUS: Problems, Resources, and Issues in Mathematics Undergraduate Studies editorial board since 2017. Since 2019, Diaz Eaton has been one of the Course Editors for CourseSource.

== Personal life ==
Diaz Eaton identifies as a first generation Latinx mathematician; her father is from Peru and she has a White American mother. She has two children, both born while she was a graduate student at the University of Tennessee.
