= Karrie =

Karrie is an English and Swedish feminine given name that is an alternate form of Carrie and a diminutive form of Caroline and Carol. Notable people referred to by this name include the following:

== Given name ==
- Karrie Delaney (born 1978), American politician
- Karrie Downey (born 1973), American volleyball player, and coach
- Karrie Keyes (born 1967), American audio engineer
- Karrie Webb (born 1974), Australian golfer

== Nickname ==
- Karrie Karahalios, nickname of Kyratso G. Karahalsio, American computer scientist

== Surname ==
- Peter Karrie, whose birthname is Peter Karagianis, (born 1946), Welsh singer

== See also ==
- Carrie (name)
- Karie (name)
- Karriem Riggins
- Karrier
