= Carrie Schneider =

American visual artist

Carrie Schneider (born 1979 in Chicago, Illinois) is an American visual artist who works in photography and film.

== Biography ==
Schneider attended Carnegie Mellon University (BFA), The School of the Art Institute of Chicago (MFA), the Skowhegan School of Painting and Sculpture, and the Kuvataideakatemia (Finnish Academy of Fine Arts) in Helsinki as a Fulbright Fellow. Through photography, Schneider explores the creation of fiction and its tie to truthfulness. Examples of her work are held by the Art Institute of Chicago, the Museum of Contemporary Photography in Chicago and the Canadian Centre for Architecture in Montreal, Quebec. In 2015 Schneider received a Creative Capital Award.
