= Carrie Lee Sze Kei =

Malaysian actress, model, and businesswoman

- Born: 12 December 1985 (age 40); Kuala Lumpur, Malaysia
- Modeling information
- Height: 5 ft 7 in (1.70 m)
- Eye color: Brownish

Chinese name
- Traditional Chinese: 李詩琪
- Simplified Chinese: 李诗琪
- Hanyu Pinyin: Lí Sīqī
- Yale Romanization: Lèih Sī-kèih
- Jyutping: Lei5 Si1 Kei4
- Hokkien POJ: Lí Si-kî
- Website: www.carrielee.com.my

Carrie Lee Sze Kei (simplified Chinese: 李诗琪; traditional Chinese: 李詩琪; Jyutping: Lei5 Si1 Kei4; Pe̍h-ōe-jī: Lí Si-kî; born 12 December 1985) is a Malaysian actress, model, and businesswoman. She won the Miss Chinese Cosmos beauty pageant in Hong Kong in 2004.

== Early life and career ==
Lee was born in Kuala Lumpur, Malaysia. She is a third generation Malaysian Chinese. Describing her own personality, she stated that she rarely cried as a child. She did her education at SMK Segambut Jaya in Segambut, Kuala Lumpur, and represented the Federal Territory in handball. During her school days, she was known as a tomboy, an image which she later chose to shed.

She represented Malaysia in Miss Tourism International 2003 and placed Top 15. In 2004, Lee represented Malaysia in the Miss Chinese Cosmos beauty pageant. During the proceedings, she spoke Chinese rather stammeringly, which observers suggested could be a barrier to her carrying out her duties as title-holder; nevertheless, she went on to win the top prize. In media interviews following her victory, she stated that she hoped to become an actress. The following year, she entered Jinan University's Chinese Department as a short-term student to study Chinese. Her oral skills showed significant improvement compared to the Miss Chinese Cosmos proceedings, but she was still not able to read or write Chinese aside from her own name. She hoped that studying at Jinan University would help her to become literate in Chinese and appreciate Chinese culture. She returned to Malaysia in 2005. By 2007, she had appeared in two Chinese-language television series in Malaysia, and worked as a promotional model for Pepsi, Matsushita, and Sony. She later went into business, purchasing the Miss Chinese Cosmos franchise for Malaysia, and founding White Fairy Sdn. Bhd., an event planning company. She also host a tourism programme (States in Malaysia) 13 episodes Wayang Tinggi Production House for RTM.

== Drama ==
- Love Circle (缘分摩天轮), 20 episodes, RTM2, produced by Zaaf Production House, directed by Ken Soh
- All for Love (但愿人长久), lead actress, 20 episodes, RTM2, produced by SystemVation Sdn Bhd
- Muli (Again), lead actress, GMA Network (60 episodes) & RTM2 (26 episodes), co-produced with Creasian Sbn Bhd
