= Carrie Jenkins Harris =

Carrie Jenkins Harris may refer to:

- Carrie Jenkins Harris (American writer and editor) (1847–1903)
- Carrie Jenkins Harris (Canadian novelist) (ca. 1858–1903)
