= Regina Miller =

American basketball player and coach

Biographical details
- Born: October 6, 1962 (age 64)
- Education: Old Dominion University; Western Kentucky University

Playing career
- 1980–1984: Old Dominion

Coaching career (HC unless noted)
- 1986–1987: Arizona (assistant)
- 1987–1992: Old Dominion (assistant)
- 1992–1998: Western Illinois
- 1998–2008: UNLV
- 2011–2018: UIC

Head coaching record
- Overall: 330–348 (.487)
- Tournaments: 0–2 (NCAA); 5–5 (WNIT)

Accomplishments and honors

Championships
- WBI (2014)

Awards
- 1 – MCC Coach of the Year (1994)

Regina Lorraine Miller (born October 6, 1962) is the former head women's basketball coach at the University of Illinois at Chicago. She previously served as the head women's basketball coach at UNLV from 1998 to 2008 and Western Illinois University from 1992 to 1998.

== Head coaching record ==
Record table
Season	Team	Overall	Conference	Standing	Postseason
Western Illinois Leathernecks (Mid-Continent Conference) (1992–1998)
1992–93	Western Illinois	3–21	1–15	9th	
1993–94	Western Illinois	15–13	11–7	3rd	
1994–95	Western Illinois	17–12	14–4	T–1st	NCAA First Round
1995–96	Western Illinois	10–17	8–10	8th	
1996–97	Western Illinois	7–20	4–12	7th	
1997–98	Western Illinois	8–18	5–11	7th	
Western Illinois:		60–101 (.373)	43–59 (.422)		
UNLV Lady Rebels (Western Athletic Conference) (1998–1999)
1998–99	UNLV	17–11	7–7	4th (Mountain Division)	
UNLV Lady Rebels (Mountain West Conference) (1999–2008)
1999–00	UNLV	17–12	8–6	5th	
2000–01	UNLV	19–10	8–6	T–3rd	WNIT Second Round
2001–02	UNLV	23–8	9–5	4th	NCAA First Round
2002–03	UNLV	17–12	8–6	T–3rd	WNIT First Round
2003–04	UNLV	26–8	10–4	3rd	WNIT Runners-Up
2004–05	UNLV	16–15	6–8	T–5th	WNIT First Round
2005–06	UNLV	18–12	9–7	6th	WNIT First Round
2006–07	UNLV	14–15	8–8	6th	
2007–08	UNLV	8–22	4–12	T–7th	
UNLV:		175–125 (.583)	70–62 (.530)		
UIC Flames (Horizon League) (2011–2018)
2011–12	UIC	18–13	10–8	4th	
2012–13	UIC	9–21	5–11	9th	
2013–14	UIC	26–9	10–6	T–3rd	WBI Champion
2014–15	UIC	16–14	6–10	5th	
2015–16	UIC	12–18	3–15	10th	
2016–17	UIC	6–25	2–16	10th	
2017–18	UIC	8–22	1–17	10th	
UIC:		95–122 (.438)	37–83 (.308)		
Total:		330–348 (.487)			
National champion Postseason invitational champion Conference regular season champion Conference regular season and conference tournament champion Division regular season champion Division regular season and conference tournament champion Conference tournament champion
