= Carrie N. Baker =

American lawyer and academic

- Education: Emory School of Graduate Studies, Ph.D., M.A. Emory University School of Law, J.D. Yale University, B.A.
- Title: Sylvia Dlugasch Bauman Professor of American Studies, Smith College
- Website: https://www.carriebakerphd.com/

Carrie N. Baker is an American lawyer, the Sylvia Dlugasch Bauman Professor of American Studies, and professor in the Program for the Study of Women, Gender and Sexuality at Smith College in Northampton, Massachusetts. She teaches courses on gender, law, public policy and women's movements, and is affiliated with the Archives Concentration Program. She co-founded and is a former co-director of the certificate in Reproductive Health, Rights, and Justice Program offered by the Five College Consortium.

Baker has published five books: The Women's Movement Against Sexual Harassment (Cambridge University Press, 2007) (winner of the Sara A. Whaley Book Prize), Fighting the US Youth Sex Trade (Cambridge University Press, 2018), Sexual Harassment Law (Carolina Academic Press, 2020) with Jennifer Drobac and Rigel Oliveri, Public Feminisms: From Academy to Community, edited with Aviva Dove-Viebahn. (Lever Press, 2023), and Abortion Pills: US History and Politics (Amherst College Press, 2024) (winner of the 2026 ACLS Open Access Book Prize in History). She has also written many scholarly articles on sexual harassment, sex trafficking, violence against women and reproductive rights.

Baker is a contributing editor and regular writer for Ms. Magazine and co-chairs the Ms. Committee of Scholars, which connects academic scholarship to feminist public writing. She has a monthly column in the Daily Hampshire Gazette and has a monthly radio show, Feminist Futures, on WHMP in Northampton, MA. She is also a Thursday co-host of Talk the Talk on WHMP. She is a former president of the Abortion Rights Fund of Western Massachusetts, formerly on the board member of Planned Parenthood Advocacy Fund of Massachusetts and a founder of the Abortion Truth Campaign, which advocates for transparency and accountability for antiabortion crisis pregnancy centers.

== Education ==
Baker received a B.A. in Philosophy from Yale University in 1987, a J.D. from Emory University School of Law in 1994, and a M.A. and Ph.D. in Women, Gender, and Sexuality Studies from Emory University in 1994 and 2001 respectively. While in law school, she was editor-in-chief of the Emory Law Journal and, from 1994 to 1996, she served as a law clerk to United States District Court Judge Marvin Herman Shoob in Atlanta, Georgia.

== Teaching ==
Before teaching at Smith College, Baker taught at the Berry College in the department of Sociology and Anthropology, where she chaired the Women's Studies Program, directed the Interdisciplinary Studies Program and was the co-directed the Southern Women Writers Conference in 2003. She served as a Visiting Assistant Professor at Emory University from 2001-2001.

== Awards ==
Her first book, The Women's Movement Against Sexual Harassment, won the 2008 National Women's Studies Association Sara A. Whaley book prize. Her fifth book, Abortion Pills: US History and Politics, won the 2026 ACLS Open Access Book Prize in History.

For her teaching, Baker was awarded the 2006 Dave and Lu Garrett Award for Meritorious Teaching at Berry College, the 2018 Student Government Association Annual Teaching Award at Smith College, and the 2020 Sherrerd Teaching Award at Smith College. She was named the Sylvia Dlugasch Bauman Professor of American Studies in 2021.

== Scholarly Articles ==
Published Scholarly Articles
Year	Journal	Title
2023	Journal of Health Politics, Law and Policy | Duke University Press	History and Politics of Medication Abortion and the Rise of Telemedicine and Self-Managed Abortion
2021	Contraception	Access to Medication Abortion Among Massachusetts’ Public University Students
2021	Penn Program on Regulation	Supreme Court Reinstates Barriers to Abortion by Telemedicine
2020	ADVANCE Journal | National Science Foundation	Amplification of Structural Inequalities: Research Sabbaticals During COVID-19
2020	Feminist Formations | Johns Hopkins University Press	Amplifying Our Voices: Feminist Scholars Writing for the Public
2018	Feminist Formations | Johns Hopkins University Press	Teaching to Empower
2018	Politics & Gender | Cambridge University Press	Racialized Rescue Narratives in Public Discourses on Youth Prostitution and Sex Trafficking in the United States
2017	Violence Against Women | SAGE Journals	Challenging Narratives of the Anti-Rape Movement’s Decline
2016	Journal of Women, Politics & Policy | Taylor & Francis Online	Obscuring Gender-Based Violence: Marriage Promotion and Teen Dating Violence Research
2015	Journal of Human Trafficking	An Examination of Some Central Debates on Sex Trafficking in Research and Public Policy in the United States
2014	Meridians | Duke University Press	An Intersectional Analysis of Sex Trafficking Films
2013	Journal of Feminist Scholarship | University of Rhode Island	Moving Beyond “Slaves, Sinners, and Saviors”: An Intersectional Feminist Analysis of US SexTrafficking Discourses, Law and Policy
2008	Journal of Women, Politics & Policy | Taylor & Francis Online	Pay No Attention to the Man Behind the Curtain! Power, Privacy, and the Legal Regulation of Violence Against Women
2007	Journal of Women's History | Johns Hopkins University Press	The Emergence of Organized Feminist Resistance to Sexual Harassment in the United States in the 1970s
2005	NWSA Journal | Johns Hopkins University Press	"An Orchid in the Arctic": Women's Studies in the Rural South
2004	Feminist Studies	Race, Class, and Sexual Harassment in the 1970s
