= Carrie Bearden =

American clinical psychologist

Carrie Elyse Bearden
- Occupations: Psychologist and academic
- Awards: 33rd H.W. Magoun Annual Distinguished Lectureship, Brain Research Institute, UCLA (2022); Fellow of the Association for Psychological Science (2019); Joel Elkes Research Award, American College of Neuropsychopharmacology (2017); A.E. Bennett Neuropsychiatric Research Award for Clinical Science, Society of Biological Psychiatry (2002)

Academic background
- Education: UC Berkeley; University of Pennsylvania
- Thesis: The Neurocognitive Phenotype of 22q11.2 Deletion Syndrome
- Doctoral advisor: Tyrone D. Cannon

Carrie Elyse Bearden is an American psychologist and academic. She is a professor at the David Geffen School of Medicine, University of California, Los Angeles, and director of the UCLA Center for the Assessment and Prevention of Prodromal States, a clinical research program for youth at high risk for psychotic disorders. She is most known for her research taking a ‘genetics first’ approach to study brain mechanisms underlying the development of serious mental illness. Her work has identified biological convergence between genetically and clinically defined high-risk populations.

== Early life and education ==
Bearden was born in Houston, Texas and grew up in Hawaii Kai, Hawaii. She moved to Milpitas, California at age 13 and attended Milpitas High School. She then earned a Bachelor of Arts degree in Psychology from the University of California at Berkeley in 1993, following which she joined the Kewalo Basin Marine Mammal Laboratory at the University of Hawaii as a Research Intern, where she studied dolphin communication. She then became a Research Associate at the Western Psychiatric Institute and Clinic in Pittsburgh, working for the MacArthur Network on Development and Psychopathology. She then obtained a PhD in Clinical Psychology from the University of Pennsylvania. She completed her postdoctoral fellowship in pediatric cognitive neuroscience at the University of Pennsylvania and Children's Hospital of Philadelphia from 2001 to 2002.

== Career ==
In 2003, Bearden joined the faculty at the University of California, Los Angeles, where she is currently a professor in the Department of Psychiatry and Biobehavioral Sciences, the Semel Institute of Neuroscience and Human Behavior, and Brain Research Institute, and holds a joint appointment in the UCLA Department of Psychology.

Bearden serves as the director of the UCLA Center for the Assessment and Prevention of Prodromal States and the Adolescent Serious Mental Illness Psychology Internship and Externship Tracks, and Vice Chair of the Academic Appointments and Advancement Committee for the UCLA Department of Psychiatry and Biobehavioral Sciences since 2022. She currently chairs the DSM-V Serious Mental Disorders Committee.

== Research ==
Bearden has authored over 300 publications in peer-reviewed scientific journals and book chapters, spanning the areas of developmental psychopathology, brain imaging, biomarkers of psychosis risk and neurogenetics.

=== Rare neurogenetic disorders ===
Bearden has conducted research on copy number variants (CNVs) that are highly penetrant for psychiatric conditions, particularly the 22q11.2 deletion, using it as a model to investigate susceptibility to developmental neuropsychiatric disorders. Her early research characterized the neuropsychiatric manifestations observed in individuals with 22q11.2 deletion syndrome (22q11DS) and highlighted the potential of animal models to replicate specific aspects of this syndrome, providing a platform for future translational research and identification of drug targets. Conducting cortical mapping studies of large samples of individuals with 22q11DS, she demonstrated that deletion size has a considerable impact on brain structure in this disorder. Additionally, her work highlighted a marked convergence of affected brain regions between psychosis in 22q11DS and idiopathic schizophrenia. Her lab also found evidence that duplications at the 22q11.2 locus – a CNV that is putatively protective against schizophrenia- are associated with global opposing effects on brain structure.

=== Biomarkers for psychosis ===
Bearden's research in the identification of biomarkers for psychosis in at-risk youth has contributed to the development of early intervention strategies and personalized treatment plans for individuals at risk of developing psychotic disorders. Through epidemiological studies, her work revealed that abnormalities in neuromotor function, language, and cognition during early development can predict schizophrenia later in life. Based on these early findings she has conducted prospective longitudinal studies both independently and collectively as part of the North American Prodromal Longitudinal Study (NAPLS) multisite consortium on youth at clinical high risk (CHR) for psychosis, identifying brain-based biomarkers that predict outcomes in at-risk youth both at baseline and progressively over time. She co-leads the Psychosis-Risk Outcomes Network (ProNET) global multisite study of youth at CHR for psychosis, part of the Accelerating Medicines Partnership Schizophrenia (AMP-SCZ).

== Awards and honors ==
- 2002 – A.E. Bennett Neuropsychiatric Research Award for Clinical Science, Society of Biological Psychiatry
- 2003, 2006 – Young Investigator Award, National Alliance for Research on Schizophrenia and Affective Disorders
- 2006 – Samuel Gershon Junior Investigator Award, International Society for Bipolar Disorders
- 2012 – UCLA Semel Institute Teaching Award, Outstanding Research Mentor Award
- 2015 – Joanne and George Miller Family Endowed Term chair, UCLA Brain Research Institute
- 2016 – Fellow, American College of Neuropsychopharmacology
- 2017 – Joel Elkes Research Award, American College of Neuropsychopharmacology
- 2019 – Fellow of the Association for Psychological Science
- 2020 – Clarivate Analytics, most highly cited researchers (Top 1%, Jan 2010– Dec 2020)
- 2022 – George M Thompson Award for Distinguished Service, SOBP Women's Leadership Group (team award)
- 2022 – 33rd H.W. Magoun Annual Distinguished Lectureship, Brain Research Institute

== Selected articles ==
- Sanders, S. J., Sahin, M., Hostyk, J., Thurm, A., Jacquemont, S., Avillach, P., ... & Bearden, C. E. (2019). A framework for the investigation of rare genetic disorders in neuropsychiatry. Nature medicine, 25(10), 1477–1487.
- Ching, C. R., Gutman, B. A., Sun, D., Villalon Reina, J., Ragothaman, A., Isaev, D., ... & Bearden, C. E. (2020). Mapping subcortical brain alterations in 22q11. 2 deletion syndrome: Effects of deletion size and convergence with idiopathic neuropsychiatric illness. American Journal of Psychiatry, 177(7), 589–600.
- Davies, R. W., Fiksinski, A. M., Breetvelt, E. J., Williams, N. M., Hooper, S. R., Monfeuga, T., ... & Vorstman, J. A. (2020). Using common genetic variation to examine phenotypic expression and risk prediction in 22q11. 2 deletion syndrome. Nature medicine, 26(12), 1912–1918.
- Sun, D., Ching, C. R., Lin, A., Forsyth, J. K., Kushan, L., Vajdi, A., ... & Bearden, C. E. (2020). Large-scale mapping of cortical alterations in 22q11. 2 deletion syndrome: Convergence with idiopathic psychosis and effects of deletion size. Molecular psychiatry, 25(8), 1822–1834.
- Forsyth, J. K., Nachun, D., Gandal, M. J., Geschwind, D. H., Anderson, A. E., Coppola, G., & Bearden, C. E. (2020). Synaptic and gene regulatory mechanisms in schizophrenia, autism, and 22q11. 2 copy number variant–mediated risk for neuropsychiatric disorders. Biological psychiatry, 87(2), 150–163.
- Moreau, C. A., Ching, C. R., Kumar, K., Jacquemont, S., & Bearden, C. E. (2021). Structural and functional brain alterations revealed by neuroimaging in CNV carriers. Current opinion in genetics & development, 68, 88–98.
