= Sergey Gavrilets =

American biologist

- Born: Сергей Юрьевич Гаврилец; Moscow, Soviet Union
- Education: Moscow State University (BSc, 1982; PhD, 1987)
- Awards: President's Award, American Society of Naturalists (2000); Guggenheim fellowship (2008); Key Distinguished Lecture, American Genetic Association (2013); Fellow of the American Academy of Arts and Sciences (2017)
- Scientific career
- Fields: Theoretical evolutionary biology, social and cultural evolution
- Workplaces: Vavilov Institute of General Genetics, Moscow, Russia (1987–1991); INRA, Toulouse, France (1991–1992); University of California, Davis (1992–1995); University of Tennessee, Knoxville (1995–present); National Institute for Mathematical and Biological Synthesis (2008–2021)
- Doctoral advisor: Yuri Svirezhev

Sergey Gavrilets is a Russian-born American scientist, currently a Distinguished Professor of Ecology and Evolutionary Biology and Mathematics at the University of Tennessee. Initially trained as a physicist, he established a career in theoretical evolutionary biology before shifting his focus to modeling human social and cultural evolution.

He uses mathematical and computational models to study complex biological and social processes. He has made contributions to the study of speciation, sexual selection, fitness landscapes, sexual conflict, social complexity, evolutionary game theory, homosexuality, social norms, and cultural evolution.

He was the Associate Director for Scientific Activities at the National Institute for Mathematical and Biological Synthesis during the life of the NSF award (2008-2021) and the Director of the Center for the Dynamics of Social Complexity (DySoC) (2018-2022).

In 2017, he was elected a Fellow of the American Academy of Arts and Sciences.

Gavrilets contributed to the book Evolution: The Extended Synthesis (edited by Massimo Pigliucci and Gerd B. Müller, 2010).

== Books ==
- Gavrilets, S. (2026), Social Influence and the Logic of Collective Action, Princeton University Press, ISBN 9780691275963
- Gavrilets, S. (2004), Fitness Landscapes and the Origin of Species, Princeton University Press, ISBN 978-0691119830
- Rice, William R; Gavrilets, Sergey, eds. (2014), The Genetics and Biology of Sexual Conflict, Cold Spring Harbor, ISBN 978-1-621820-59-8
