= Carrie Johnson (disambiguation) =

Carrie Johnson (born 1988) is an English media consultant and is married to former British prime minister Boris Johnson.

Carrie Johnson may also refer to:

- Carrie Johnson (canoeist) (born 1984), American Olympic canoeist
- Carrie Johnson (journalist), American journalist
- Carrie Ashton Johnson (1863–1949), American suffragist, editor, and author
- Caroline Johnson (born 1977), British politician and doctor

== See also ==
- Carrie Johnston, Canadian voice actor and writer
