= Carrie Halsell Ward =

First African-American student to graduate from an Oregon State University.(1926)

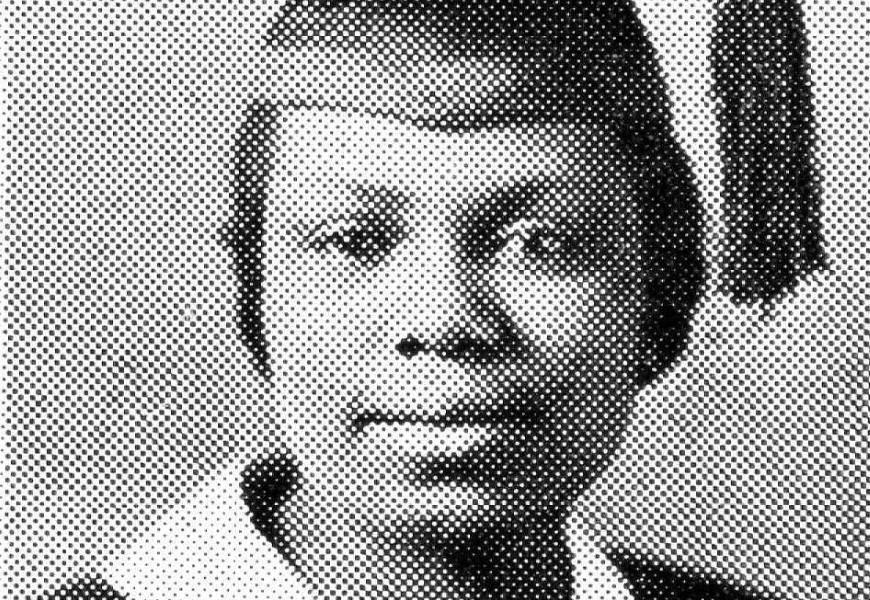
- Born: Carrie Beatrice Halsell Ward; October 26, 1903; Boulder, Colorado, US
- Died: July 1, 1989 (aged 85); Orangeburg, South Carolina, US
- Education: Oregon State University (BSc); New York University (MBA)
- Occupation: University business instructor
- Known for: First Black student to graduate from an Oregon public university.

Carrie Beatrice Halsell Ward (1903–1989) is the first known African American to graduate from a public university in the state of Oregon. She graduated in 1926, with a Bachelor of Science in Business from Oregon State University.

== Early life ==
Halsell was born on October 26, 1903, in Boulder, Colorado to William and Bessie Halsell, the third of six children. The family moved to Salem, Oregon around 1912 where William worked various jobs, including: janitor, laborer, and farmer. By 1921, William was supporting the family with a small retail business on State Street in Salem.

In high school, Halsell was an honor student and participated in the glee club, girls' club, girls' reserve, commercial club, and typewriting contests. She received her high school diploma from Salem High School in 1921.

After high school, Halsell was accepted to Oregon State University, where she received her business degree in 1926. After graduating, she and her family moved to Portland where she worked briefly in a housekeeping position for Meier & Frank Department Store. The job was one of the few employment opportunities for an African-American woman in the area. Portland's African-American community newspaper, The Advocate, printed a brief story about Halsell's return visit to Corvallis in July of 1927.

== Career ==
In September 1927, Halsell took a position at Virginia State University, as an assistant to the registrar, and later as an instructor in business. While working at Virginia State, she helped establish the Alpha Eta chapter of Delta Sigma Theta, a historic black sorority.

In 1945 Halsell took a position at South Carolina State University. She obtained her master's in business administration from New York University in 1949 while attending summer classes.

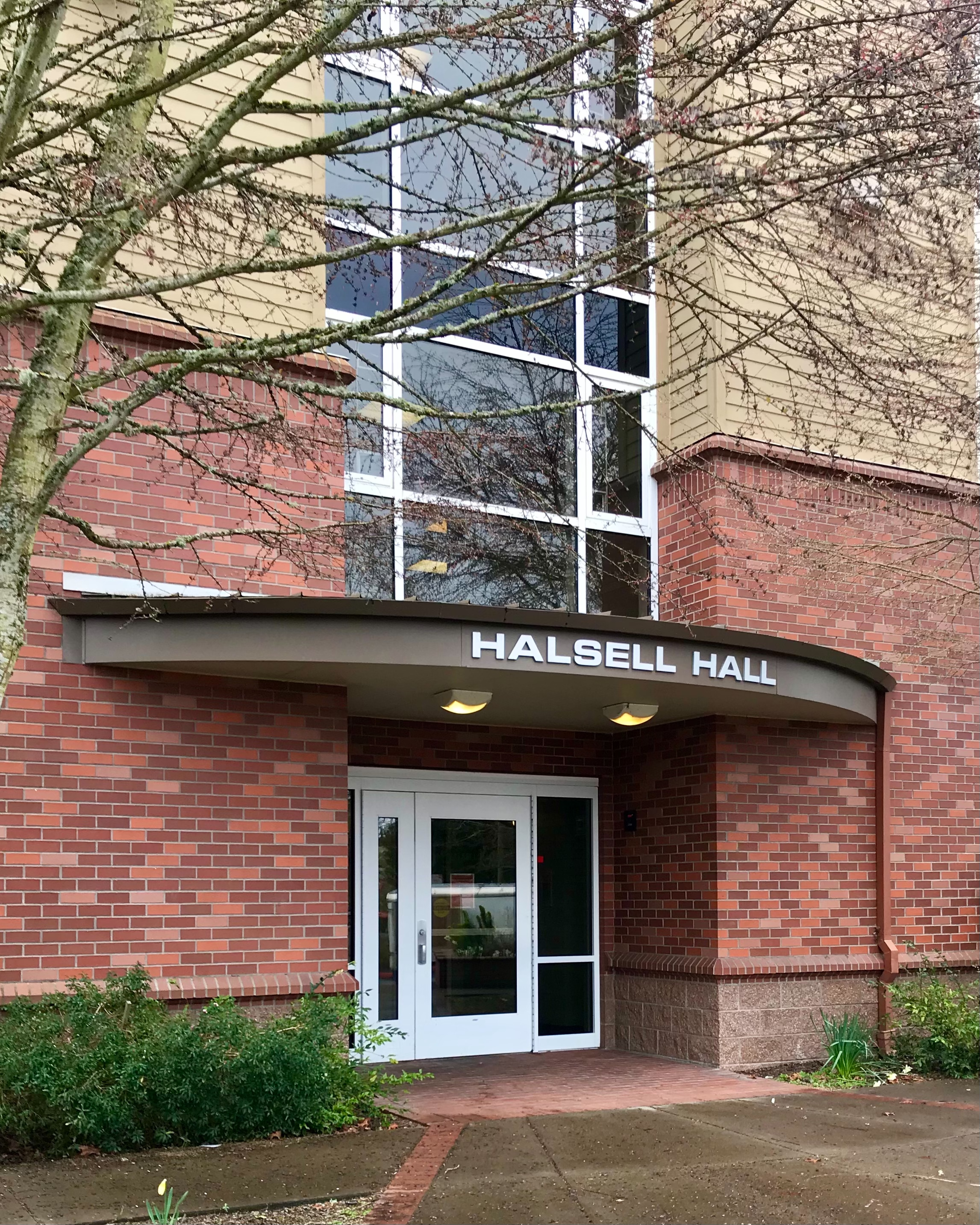
Entrance of Halsell Hall at Oregon State University.

== Personal life ==
Halsell married Louis Morris Ward, a faculty member in business administration at South Carolina State University. She died in July 1989, at the age of 85 in Orangeburg, South Carolina.

== Legacy ==
In 2002 Oregon State University named a residence hall in her honor. In 2016 Salem High School posthumously gave her an achievement award as the first African American to graduate from Salem High School.
