= Carrie Black =

Carrie Black may refer to:

- Carrie Nelson Black (1859–1936), American in Ohio Women's Hall of Fame
- Carrie Black (OITNB), played by Lea DeLaria
