= Carrie Jane Sutton Brooks =

Carrie Jane Sutton Brooks (January 15, 1899 – January 12, 1964) was a pioneering African-American woman medical doctor who trained as a surgeon at Howard University College of Medicine.

Brooks was born Carrie Jane Sutton in San Antonio, Texas, and was class valedictorian of Riverside High School. She then did undergraduate work at Howard University and the University of Pennsylvania, before attending Howard University's medical school. She graduated there in the early 1920s and turned down a research fellowship to become one of the first black interns at the Freedman's Hospital in Washington, D.C.

She returned to San Antonio to practice medicine and helped establish the first YWCA for black people in her home town. She later married a fellow doctor, Joseph Hunter Brooks, and moved with him to Montclair, N.J., where they both practiced medicine. She died after a long illness and is buried in San Antonio.
