= Carrie Cutter =

American nurse

- Born: 1842; Milford, New Hampshire
- Died: 1862 (aged 19–20)
- Education: Mount Holyoke College
- Occupation: Nurse

Carrie Eliza Cutter (1842–1862) was an American nurse.

She was the daughter of surgeon Calvin Cutter. An 1861 graduate of Mount Holyoke College, she helped her father in the 21st Regiment Massachusetts Volunteer Infantry as a nurse. She was referred to as "the Florence Nightingale of the 21st." During Burnside's North Carolina Expedition in 1862, she worked in the field with the regiment. Cutter served as a translator for German soldiers who did not speak English. She was engaged to Private Charles E. Colledge from the 25th Massachusetts. She traveled to Newbern Harbor after learning that he had contracted typhoid fever. He died and she was infected, dying on March 24, 1862. A memorial at the Elm Street Cemetery references her as the first female death of the Civil War.

Congress granted special permission for Cutter to be interred with full military honors at New Bern National Cemetery in Section 10, grave 1698 next to her betrothed, Charles Colledge. She was the first woman to be buried in the cemetery. Later, Clara Barton wrote a poem in Cutter's memory.
