= Carrie Rose =

British entrepreneur

Carrie Rose Balloch
- Born: Carrie Rose Balloch; 17 March 1993 (age 33)
- Education: University of Leeds
- Occupation: Businesswoman
- Known for: Co-Founder and CEO, Rise at Seven

Carrie Rose Balloch (born 17 March 1993) is a British entrepreneur. She is the co-founder and chief executive of Rise at Seven, an SEO and advertising agency.

== Career ==
Rose studied Digital Media at The University of Leeds and graduated in 2014.

Rose worked in search engine optimisation (SEO) for seven years at various agencies in Leeds, England before founding a business.

In 2019, Rose applied for the BBC's The Apprentice TV show. She created a business plan and made it through to the final 30 but then was rejected. Rose was offered an investment to launch Rise at Seven with co-founder Stephen Kenwright.

In 2021, Rose was named in Campaign Magazines' '30 under 30' list.

In 2021, Rose's company offered to pay students' rent if they quit university and worked for her in response to the disruption to further education during the COVID-19 pandemic.

In 2022, Rose led an MBO buying both shareholders out and become sole owner of the business.

Rise at Seven run search first content marketing for brands who want to be category leaders, including Red Bull, Monzo, Bumble, Wayfair, SIXT and more
