= Carrie Kabak =

- Born: Bolton, Lancashire, England
- Education: Cardiff University
- Occupations: Author; Production Designer
- Writing career
- Period: 1997–present
- Genre: Fiction

Carrie Kabak is an author and production designer. Born and raised in the United Kingdom, she now lives in Missouri.

Her first book, Cover the Butter, won an AudioFile Earphones Award in 2006. It was reviewed by Publishers Weekly, Booklist, Kirkus Reviews, and Library Journal.

== Carrie Kabak Publications ==
- Cover the Butter (2005), Dutton Adult
- For Keeps (Contributor), Seal Press
- He Said What? (Contributor) Seal Press
- Exit Laughing (Contributor) North Atlantic Books
