= Carrie Hawks =

American director and animator

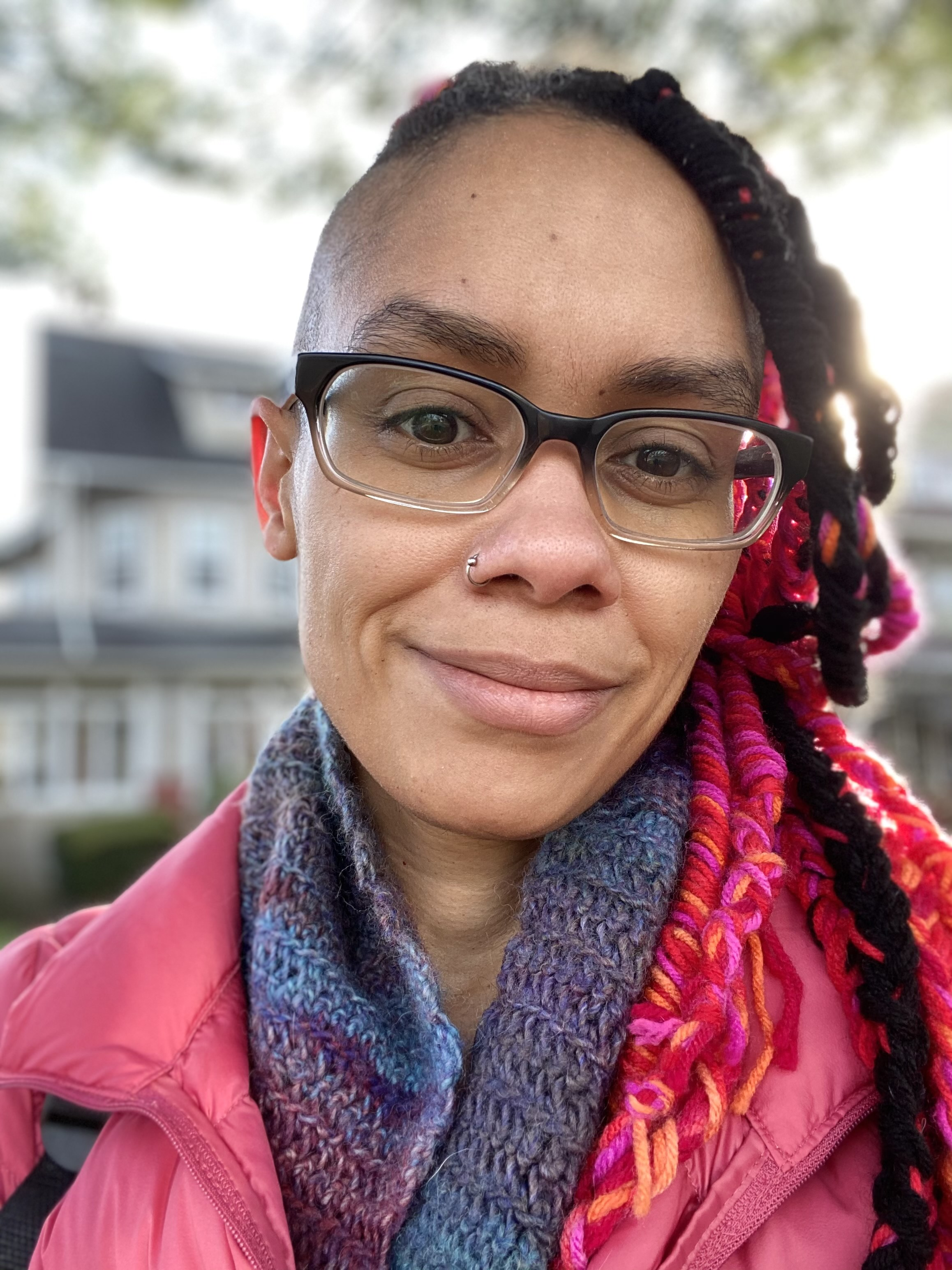
- Hawks in 2020
- Born: Grand Rapids, Michigan, U.S.
- Occupations: Director, Artist, Animator, Designer

Carrie Hawks is a gender non-conforming director and animator. They are known for their work on Black Enuf.

== Early life and education ==
Carrie was born in Grand Rapids, Michigan and grew up in Kansas City, Missouri. They hold a BA in Art History and Visual Arts from Barnard College and a BFA in Graphic Design from Georgia State University.

== Career ==
They work in a variety of media including drawing, doll-making, performance and animation.

Carrie’s first documentary short film, Delilah, won the Best Experimental Award at the Reel Sisters of the Diaspora Film Festival in 2012. Their second documentary short film, black enuf*, was funded in part by The Jerome Foundation and included in Black Public Media’s AfroPop series. This film included first person narratives and memories that they collected. The film won Best Animation at the First City Film Festival and the Audience Award for Best Women’s Short film at the Out on Film Festival in Atlanta. They have performed with Black Women Artist for Black Lives Matter in the New Museum of Contemporary Art and selected for the Set on Freedom Artist Residency in the Queens Museum and awarded the Jerome Camargo Residency in 2019.

== Selected exhibitions ==
- 2018 Solo – black enuf*, Nelson-Atkins Museum of Art
- 2018 Group – Family, Community, and Shorts, Museum of Fine Arts, Houston
- 2017 Group – Black Queer Brooklyn on Film, Brooklyn Museum
- 2017 Solo – black enuf*, Kemper Museum of Contemporary Art
