= Carrie Bell Sinclair =

American litterateur and poet

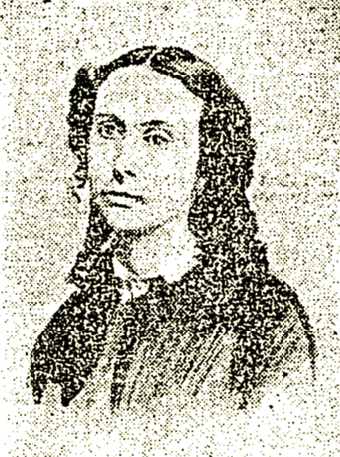
- Born: May 23, 1839; Milledgeville, Georgia, U.S.
- Died: 1883 (aged 43–44); Philadelphia, Pennsylvania, U.S.
- Occupation: poet
- Relatives: Robert Fulton
- Writing career
- Pen name: Clara; Mollie Marygold
- Subject: civil ar
- Notable works: "The Southern Girl's Homespun Dress", 1862

Carrie Bell Sinclair (pen names, Clara and Mollie Marygold; 1839–1883) was a 19th-century litterateur and poet of the American South. She published two volumes of poems, and contributed frequently to Southern papers. She was "reportedly a literary protege of Alexander H. Stephens", who served as Vice President of the Confederate States of America.

== Early life ==
She was born May 23, 1839, in Milledgeville, Georgia.

Her father, the Rev. Elijah Sinclair, a Methodist minister, was a native of South Carolina, as was her mother, and had just entered upon his ministerial labors as a member of the Georgia Conference when Carrie was born. The Rev. Mr. Sinclair was of Scottish descent. He was a Methodist minister, and was stationed for a while during her childhood at Augusta, Macon, Savannah, North Carolina and South Carolina, but as his health failed he finally settled in Macon and engaged in mercantile business. At the time of his death, the Rev. Mr. Sinclair was teaching a school for young women in Georgetown, South Carolina. He left his widow and eight daughters (Note: According to Familysearch.org, Carrie's sisters were: Martha, Mary, Francis, Ella, Sarah, Maria, Pattie, and Ada.) – the eldest only married. Carrie Bell was a child at this time. Some three years after the death of her father, a younger sister died. It was upon this occasion that Carrie Bell wrote her first rhymes, conveying her sadness in song. Soon after, her mother moved to Augusta, Georgia and then Carrie began her literary career, writing because she felt compelled to.

== Career ==
Her first appearance in print, a poem titled "The Storm", was in a weekly literary paper published in Augusta, The Georgia Gazette, under the pseudonym of "Clara".

Poems, 1860

In 1860, though dated 1861, she published a volume of poems in Augusta, Poems. She dedicated it to her friend and adviser, the Hon. Alexander H. Stephens, vice-president of the Confederacy.

Shortly after the publication of this volume, she went to Savannah, Georgia to reside, (Note: According to Rutherford (1907), Sinclair lived at Augusta, Georgia during the civil war, and there, her "Georgia, My Georgia" and "The Homespun Dress" poems were written.) and, although not entirely abandoning the field of letters, yet she felt that new duties claimed her attention, that of the wants of the Confederate States Army soldiers. When she did write, it was that she might in some way aid in the cause of the Confederate States, or record the deeds of her Southern heroes in song and story. Sinclair's poem, "The Southern Girl's Homespun Dress", (Note: Also according to Rutherford (1907), in 1911, many inquiries appeared through the press, asking who the author of The Homespun Dress was and a reward was offered to the one who would answer these satisfactorily. The habit among the Southern writers of not signing their names to their literary efforts caused much to be lost that should have been credited to the South.) was composed in the midsummer of 1862, in Augusta, Georgia. She stated that there was quite a rivalry with the girls as to who should have the neatest homespun dress, and from this incident, she took the idea and wrote what became an old war song. It was first published in an Augusta paper, and was copied in the Savannah Morning News. It was also set to music and published by Blackmar, who at that time had a music store in Augusta. Of that poem, the following remarks were made in Frank Moore's Anecdotes and Incidents of the War, North and South:—

"The accompanying song was taken from a letter of a Southern girl to her lover in Lee's army, which letter was obtained from a mail captured in Sherman's march through Northern Alabama. The materials of which the dress alluded to is made are cotton and wool, and woven on the hand-loom, so commonly seen in the houses at the South. The scrap of a dress, enclosed in the letter as a sample, was of a gray color, with a stripe of crimson and green, quite pretty, and creditable to the lady who made it."

Sinclair wrote a number of inspiring Southern poems commemorative of incidents of the war, many of which were set to music. So many stirring lyrics did she compose during war-time, that she gained the title of the "Song-bird of the South." With her own hands, she made thirteen flags of silk, and presented them to different Confederate regiments. She was the president of the Ladies Knitting Society.

After the close of the war, Sinclair was busy writing again, and contributed to most of the leading journals of the South and many in the North and West.

Her early pseudonym was "Clara", which she exchanged later for "Mollie Marygold". Under the latter title, she contributed for two years to the Boston Pilot, from which widely circulated journal many of her poems were copied into English and Irish papers.

== Personal life ==
Sinclair's later life seems to have been clouded by disappointment. Removing to Philadelphia, Pennsylvania, where a sister, Mrs. Mason, resided, she died there in 1883, at the age of forty-four.

Her second volume of poems, which she named Heart Whispers or Echoes of Songs was never published, and, after her death, was stolen.

== Selected works ==
- 1860, Poems (text)
