= Carrie Kirkman =

Business executive

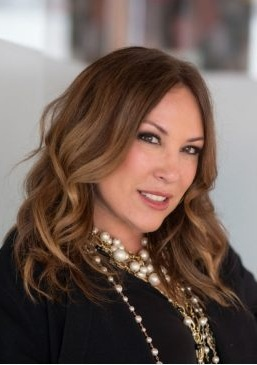
- Carrie Kirkman
- Born: 1962 or 1963 (age 63–64); Australia
- Occupation: Business executive
- Years active: 1990–present

Carrie Kirkman is the former CEO and president of Sears Canada. Kirkman took over the position in November 2015 and left in August 2016 but will remain with the retailer in an advisory role to assist the company with brand development. Prior to her role with Sears Canada, Kirkman was the interim president of shoe retailer Nine West Canada and president of Jones Apparel Group from October 2010 until April 2015.

Kirkman has previously held senior roles at Sears rival Hudson's Bay Company from 2002–2010, and Liz Claiborne Canada from 1997–2002, where she managed fashion brands such as DKNY, Liz Claiborne, and Kenneth Cole. Early in her career, Kirkman represented the Alfred Sung and Ports International brands.

== Personal ==
Kirkman was born in Australia and came to Canada in her teens in Montreal and was model until she embarked a career in fashion retailing.
