= Fantastic Sams =

American full-service haircare franchise

Fantastic Sams Franchise Corp.
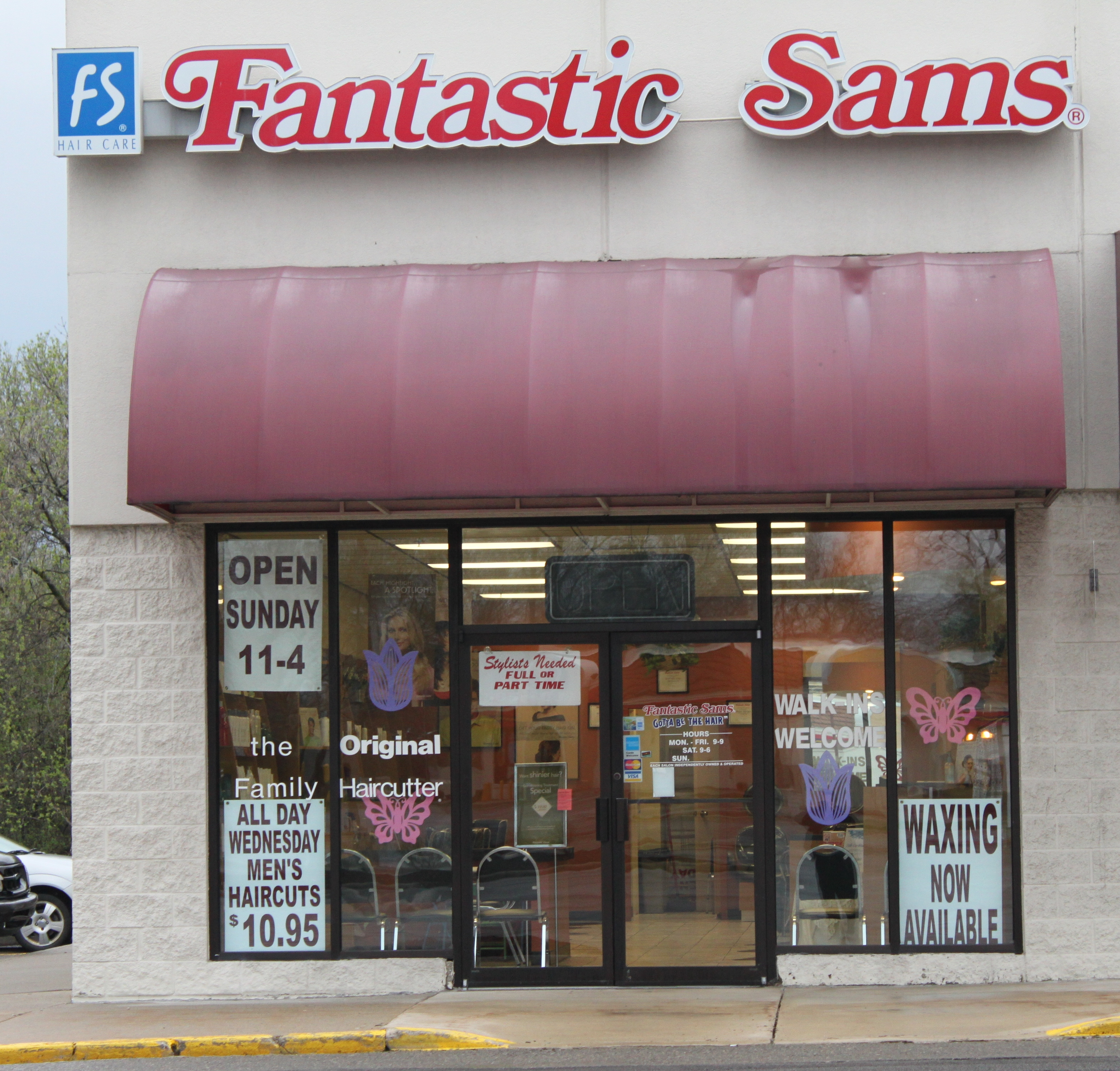
- Fantastic Sams in Ypsilanti, Michigan
- Trade name: FS Cut & Color
- Formerly: Fantastic Sams
- Company type: Private
- Industry: Haircare Franchising
- Founded: 1974
- Founder: Sam Ross
- Headquarters: Maple Grove, MN
- Number of locations: 560+
- Revenue: US$2.2 Billion (2022)
- Owner: Ross family (1974–2011); Dessange International (2011–present)
- Website: fantasticsams.com

Fantastic Sams Franchise Corp. is an American full-service haircare franchise (Fantastic Sams Cut & Color) in U.S. and Canada who pioneered the concept of a no-appointment, walk-in hair salon. With over 500 franchised locations, it was the first nationally franchised unisex salon chain in the U.S. and it is one of the largest salon chains in the U.S.

== History ==
Fantastic Sams was founded in 1974 by Sam Ross in Memphis, Tennessee. Franchising began in 1976, under the title "Incredible Sam's" but was changed in 1981 to "Fantastic Sams" so that it was easier to say. Fantastic Sams salons also sell Fantastic Sams hair-care products.

In 2003, the company's parent company, Opal Concepts, Inc., filed for Chapter 11 bankruptcy and was sold to a group of investors. Fantastic Sams Cut & Color was acquired in 2011 by Dessange International, a European beauty salon chain. Tom Boitz is CEO as of 2021.

Fantastic Sams launched a brand redesign in 2014, which included a new logo and new store design. Fantastic Sams Cut & Color also added several new product offerings.
