= Carrie Tubb =

English singer

Tubb in 1910 London opera season

Caroline Elizabeth Tubb (17 May 1876 – 20 September 1976) was an English soprano of the early 20th century, and later a teacher of singing at the Guildhall School of Music. She made her debut at London's Royal Opera House in 1910, where she appeared in such works as Elektra and Hänsel und Gretel. With Thomas Beecham's opera company at the Theatre Royal, Drury Lane, she sang in Die Fledermaus, The Marriage of Figaro and The Tales of Hoffmann. Later, she mostly appeared on the concert platform, including at 54 Prom concerts and at the major British music festivals. She also made some early recordings. Around 1930 she retired from singing and began teaching. On her hundredth birthday she was made a Fellow of the Royal College of Music.

== Life and career ==
Tubb was born in Westminster, daughter of John Tubb and Anne, née Bardon. After studying at the Guildhall School of Music she made her debut at the Royal Opera House, Covent Garden in 1910, where she appeared in works including Elektra and Hänsel und Gretel. She also sang with Thomas Beecham's opera company at the Theatre Royal, Drury Lane, in Die Fledermaus, The Marriage of Figaro and The Tales of Hoffmann. Thereafter she more often appeared on the concert platform, though often singing operatic extracts, such as the "Liebestod" from Tristan und Isolde at the Proms in 1911. Between 1911 and 1924 she sang at 54 Prom concerts. The conductor of the Proms, Sir Henry Wood, wrote of her charm, and praised her singing: "Not only had her voice a great brilliance, but she had the power to dominate an orchestra whether she sang an aria from the Messiah or a scene from Götterdämmerung". She sang at the major British music festivals, mostly in oratorios.

In her early years as a singer Tubb made a small number of recordings, which include "Ocean, thou mighty monster" from Weber's Oberon; Arensky's "Dream Waltz"; excerpts from Mendelssohn's Elijah; and from Sullivan's The Golden Legend; and popular ballads such as "Queen of the Roses; Lilac Time", "Gretna Green" and "Red rose of England".

Tubb married Alexander John Ede Oliveira (d. 1936); they had one son. She retired from singing in or around 1930 and was a professor at the Guildhall School until 1958. On her hundredth birthday she was made a Fellow of the Royal College of Music, and Sir Adrian Boult conducted a concert given in her honour by the college's orchestra.

Tubb died in London, aged 100.

== Sources ==
- Wood, Henry J. (1938). My Life of Music. London: Victor Gollancz. OCLC 30533927.
