= Carrie Weaver =

American novelist

- Born: United States
- Occupation: Novelist
- Writing career
- Period: 1999–present
- Genre: Romance

Carrie Weaver is an American author of contemporary romance novels.

== Biography ==
After Weaver had children, she chose to quit her job as a claims adjuster to stay home with them. While the children napped, she began writing romance novels to entertain herself. In 1994, she attended her first writer's conference; the following year, she joined the Romance Writers of America. Her first novel sold in 1999, to Kensington Books. The novel, Promises, Promises, was released in April 2000, and Kensington contracted her to write a novella for a July 2001 American Media MiniMag release. The MiniMag romance line was discontinued before the story was published.

At the urging of Cathy McDavid, a fellow writer, Weaver signed to write a short story for the small press Elan Press. Her short story was included in their collection Romancing the Holidays. In 2003, she began writing category romances in the Harlequin Superromance line. In 2007, she was chosen to write two novels in the new series partnering Harlequin and NASCAR.

Weaver was nominated for a Romantic Times Reviewers' Choice Award in 2004 for her novel The Second Sister. In a review, Romantic Times gave The Second Sister their highest rating, noting the "realistic characters, strong emotion and an ending that is neither pat nor clichéd."

In 2006, Weaver was a finalist in the Best Long Contemporary Romance category for the Romance Writers of America's RITA Award.

== Bibliography ==
- Promises, Promises (2000)
- The Road to Echo Point (2003)
- The Second Sister (2004)
- Home for Christmas (2005)
- The Secret Wife (2005)
- Four Little Problems (2006)
- Secrets in Texas (2006)
- No Time to Lose (2007)
- Temporary Nanny (2007)
- A Chance Worth Taking (2007)

=== Omnibus ===
- Second Sister / More Than A Cowboy (2004) (with Peggy Nicholson)

=== Collections ===
- Romancing the Holidays, Vol. 1 (2001) (with Belmont Delange, Trudy Doolittle, Christine Eaton Jones, Su Kopil, Cathy McDavid, Deborah Shelley, Barbara White-Rayczek and Karen L. Williams)
