= Carrie Jones =

Carrie Jones may refer to:

- Carrie Jones (author), American author of young adult fiction
- Carrie Jones (footballer) (born 2003), Welsh footballer
- Carrie Jones, American contestant in Pussycat Dolls Present: Girlicious
