= Clarrie White =

Australian rules footballer (1914–1991)

Personal information
- Full name: Clarence Alfred Eric White
- Born: 27 February 1914; Footscray, Victoria
- Died: 22 May 1991 (aged 77)
- Original team: Preston / West Footscray
- Height: 168 cm (5 ft 6 in)
- Weight: 66 kg (146 lb)

Playing career^{1}
Years	Club	Games (Goals)
1937	Footscray	4 (1)
1937	St Kilda	1 (0)
Total		5 (1)
- ^{1} Playing statistics correct to the end of 1937.

Clarence Alfred Eric White (27 February 1914 – 22 May 1991) was an Australian rules footballer who played with Footscray and St Kilda in the Victorian Football League (VFL).
