= Carrie Sheads =

Carrie Sheads was an American nurse and school principal. She was the principal of an all-girls boarding school near Gettysburg, Pennsylvania. In early July 1863, she wanted to take the girls on a field trip to visit the Union military camps. Before she got the chance, everyone at the school awoke one morning to the sound of gunfire. They couldn't get out of Gettysburg in time, so they used the school as a hospital to help wounded soldiers. Carrie Sheads and all the schoolgirls worked as nurses. During a confederate raid “Colonel Charles Wheelock” ran into her estate and ending up hiding in her cellar. He was later found but Carrie Sheads hid his sword so it would not be stolen.
