= Carrie Turner =

Carrie Turner may refer to:

- Carrie Turner (actress) (1863-1897), American stage actress
- Karri Turner (born 1966), American television actress
- Carrie Turner (character), fictional character from the American television drama 24, played by Lourdes Benedicto
