= Carrie Wolinetz =

American biologist

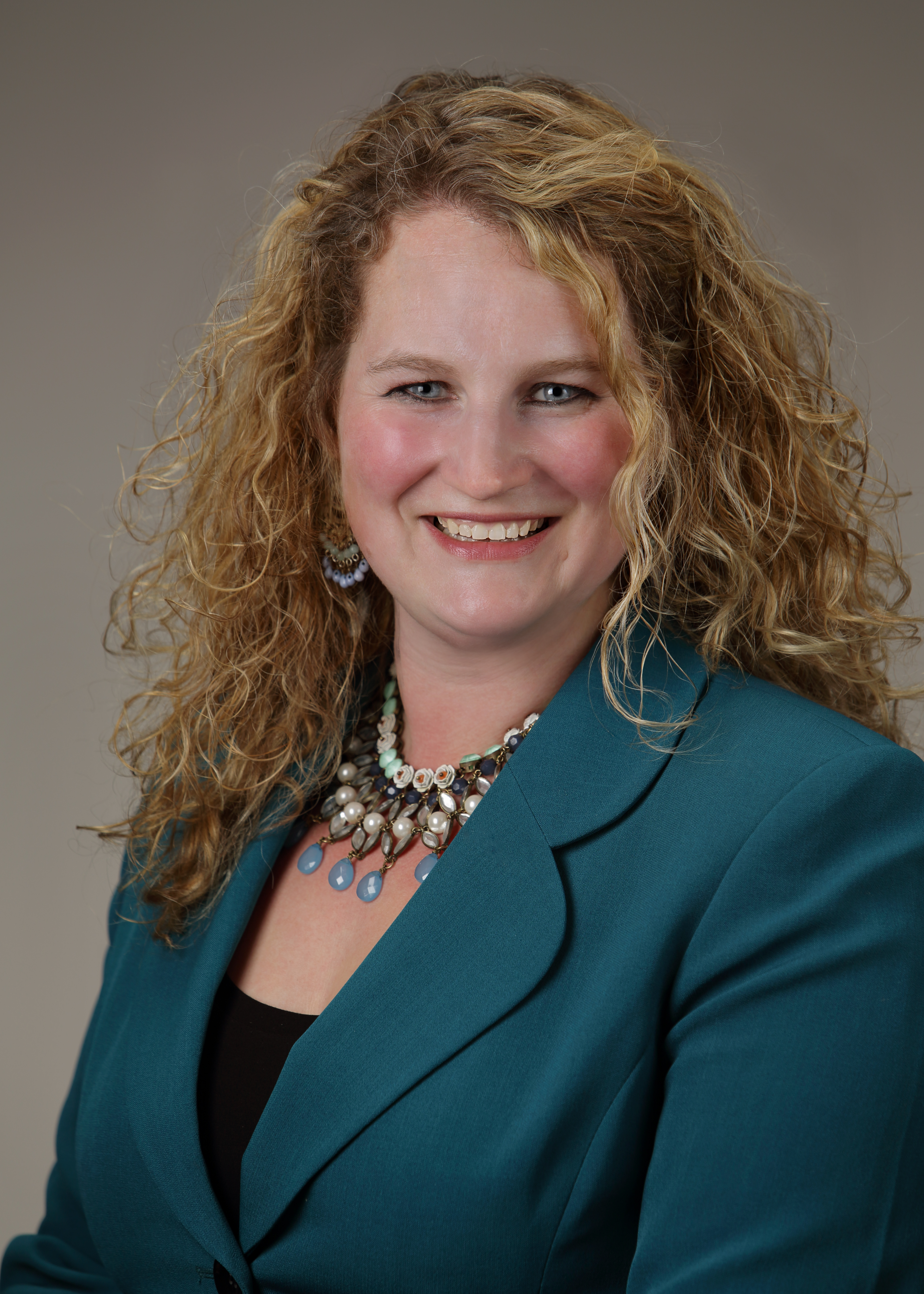
- Carrie Wolinetz

Senior Advisor to the Director National Institute of Health
- In office 2022–2023

Deputy Director for Health & Life Sciences White House Office of Science and Technology Policy
- In office 2021–2022

Associate Director of Science Policy National Institutes of Health
- In office 2015–2021

Personal details
- Education: Cornell University, B.A. Penn State, Ph.D.
- Scientific career
- Workplaces: Lewis-Burke Associates; Federation of American Societies for Experimental Biology; Association of American Universities

Carrie Wolinetz (née Carrie Golash) is the Principal and Chair of Lewis-Burke Associate's Health and Bioscience Innovation Policy Practice Group. She formerly served in the National Institutes of Health as Senior Advisor to the Office of the Director, Associate Director for Science Policy, and Chief of Staff to Francis Collins. She also led the inaugural Health and Sciences division in the White House Office of Science and Technology Policy.

== Education ==
Wolinetz grew up in Syracuse, NY and she received her undergraduate degree in Animal Science from Cornell University, and received her Ph.D. from Penn State University in Animal Science, with a focus on reproductive physiology.

== Career ==
Wolinetz began work in 2002 at the Federation of American Societies for Experimental Biology where she served as the Director of Scientific Affairs and Public Relations. Her work focused on bioethical concerns, including stem cells and biosecurity. She transitioned in 2010 to the Association of American Universities, where she worked as the Deputy Vice President for Federal relations and lobbied the National Institutes of Health on biomedical policy and funding issues. Wolinetz also worked as a Chair at the Association for Women in Science and as President of United for Medical Research.

=== National Institutes of Health ===
In 2015, Wolinetz joined the National Institutes of Health (NIH) as Associate Director for Science Policy. In that role she worked on policies concerning the ethical treatment of human subjects in clinical research. She oversaw the streamlining the institutional review board policy for multisite research and helped launch the NIH's data sharing policy. She also oversaw programs to combat sexual harassment in the scientific field.

In addition, Wolinetz led the Institute's efforts to develop better practices for dealing with emerging biotechnology. She developed regulations for dual-use biotechnology, especially gain-of-function research, and transformed the Recombinant DNA Advisory Committee (RAC) working on gene editing into the Novel and Exceptional Technology and Research Advisory committee (NExTRAC), which covered the broader field of novel biotechnology advances.

=== White House Office of Science and Technology Policy ===
In 2021, Wolinetz joined the President Biden's White House in the Office of Science and Technology Policy. In that role, she developed a policy to increase biotechnology and biomanufacturing in the United States, oversaw the President's American Pandemic Preparedness plan, and addressed gender and racial inequality in the scientific field.

=== Lewis-Burke Associates ===
In 2023, Wolinetz joined Lewis-Burke Associates to work as the Principal and Chair for their Health and Bioscience Innovation Policy Practice Group. She also teaches a course at Georgetown University on international science and technology policy.
