= Eagle Seagull =

American indie rock band

- Origin: Lincoln, Nebraska, United States
- Genres: Indie
- Years active: 2004–2010
- Labels: Paper Garden Records, Lado, PIAS Recordings
- Members: Eli Mardock; Johnny "J.J." Idt; Michael Overfield; Mardock Luther; Austin Skiles; Britt Hayes; Carrie Butler
- Website: myspace.com/eagleseagull

Eagle Seagull (sometimes stylized as Eagle*Seagull) was an American indie rock band from Lincoln, Nebraska, United States that singer/songwriter Eli Mardock formed in 2004.

== History ==
They released their debut album, Eagle*Seagull, in 2006 and released an EP, called I Hate EP's in March 2008.

In August 2008, Eagle Seagull contributed their track "I'm Sorry But I'm Beginning to Hate Your Face" to the indie compilation, Indiecater Vol. 2.

Their long delayed second album, The Year of the How-To Book, was released on March 29, 2010 on PIAS Recordings in Europe. Recorded in 2007 and 2008, the album's release was delayed for two years due to a conflict with their record label at that time. The album was released in North America in the fall of 2010 digitally only. The album was produced by Ryan Hadlock (of The Gossip, Blonde Redhead, and Stephen Malkmus) and recorded at Bear Creek Studio in Seattle, WA.

The band broke up shortly following their spring 2010 European tour, when band members Carrie Butler and Austin Skiles divorced in September 2010. Former frontman Eli Mardock, now married to Carrie Butler, is currently recording his debut solo album with a planned 2012 release. Former members J.J. Idt and Michael Overfield now play in the Nebraska indie band Conduits.

== Discography ==
- Eagle*Seagull (2006, Paper Garden Records) (2006, Lado)
- I Hate EP's (EP) (2008) Regal Beagle
- The Year of the How-To Book (March 29, 2010) PIAS Recordings

== Other sources ==
- You Ain't No Picasso
- Radio Free Chicago
- Spin
- Focus
- Intro
- Visions
