= Carrie Swidecki =

Dance game world record-holder (born 1975 or 1976)

- Born: 1975 or 1976 (age 49–50)
- Occupation: Teacher

Carrie Swidecki (born 1975 or 1976) is a teacher from Bakersfield who holds various dance game world records.

In 2010 Swidecki broke the Guinness World Record for the "longest marathon on a dance or rhythm game", playing Dance Dance Revolution for more than fifteen hours. In 2011 she again broke the Guinness World Record for the "longest marathon on a dance or rhythm game" with Dance Dance Revolution, playing for 16 hours and nine minutes. She then broke that record and set a new one in 2012, playing Dance Dance Revolution X2 for almost 22 hours.

Also in 2012, she set the Guinness World Records for the “longest marathon on a motion sensing dance game” and the “longest marathon on a dance/rhythm game” playing Dance Central 2 with a Kinect motion sensor for 24 hours.

On June 15–17, 2013 she set two Guinness World Records at the same time (the Longest Marathon on a Motion-Sensing Dance Game and the Longest Marathon on a Dance/Rhythm Game) by playing Just Dance for 49 hours 3 minutes 22 seconds, thus becoming the only person in the world to hold a world record for marathon play on all three major dance games: Just Dance, Dance Central, and Dance Dance Revolution.

She was formerly overweight and has lost 75 pounds through exergaming.

On October 6, 2018, she was inducted into the International Video Game Hall of Fame in Ottumwa, Iowa. Of this milestone achievement Swidecki says, "Somewhere there is a little girl who is playing a video game, reading a Guinness World Records Gamer’s Book, and dreaming of doing extraordinary things with gaming. Today she now knows that’s there’s a place for her in Video game history. Today that door will be permanently open for the next generation of female gamers! I know that little girl is out there, because I was once her."
