= Carrie Sweetser =

American painter

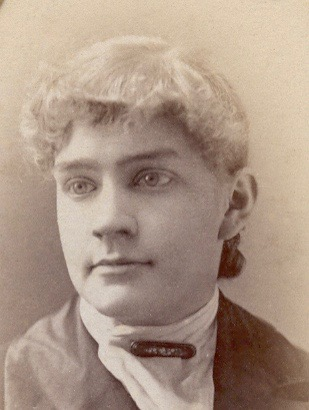
- Carolyn "Carrie" Knowles Phinney Sweetser (1863–1952)
- Born: Carolyn Knowles Phinney; September 11, 1863; Centerville, Massachusetts
- Died: September 9, 1952 (aged 88); Eugene, Oregon
- Known for: Watercolorist

Carolyn Phinney Sweetser (1863–1952) was an American watercolorist and amateur botanist who lived and worked in Oregon.

== Early life and education ==
Carolyn Knowles Phinney, daughter of Nelson and Eunice (Clark) Phinney, was born in Centerville, Massachusetts, on September 11, 1863. She married Albert Raddin Sweetser (1861–1940) in Centerville on February 29, 1888. The couple had no children, but they raised Carrie's nephew, George Phinney.

They moved to Forest Grove, Oregon, in 1897 when her husband was hired by Pacific University. They moved to Eugene when her husband joined the Botany faculty of the University of Oregon in 1902, and became head of the department in 1909.

== Watercolorist and amateur botanist ==
Sweetser spent much time over the years on botanical exploring trips with her husband and others, during which she painted watercolors of wildflowers and fungi, though she had no formal training in art. More than 300 of her paintings are in the special collections in the University of Oregon Libraries.

== Reception ==
The Eugene Guard noted, "For many who have not had the opportunity to roam over the hills and meadows of the Oregon country, these delicate watercolors are a source of great interest and knowledge. And for those who have more intimate knowledge of the wildflowers of the area, the pictures are a delightful reminder." Biographer Rhoda Love wrote, "Her surviving paintings, photographs, and diaries provide a vivid picture of a Northwest botanist's life in the early twentieth century."

Sweetser died in Eugene on September 9, 1952, two days short of eighty-nine years.
