= Carrie McCabe =

Carrie A. McCabe
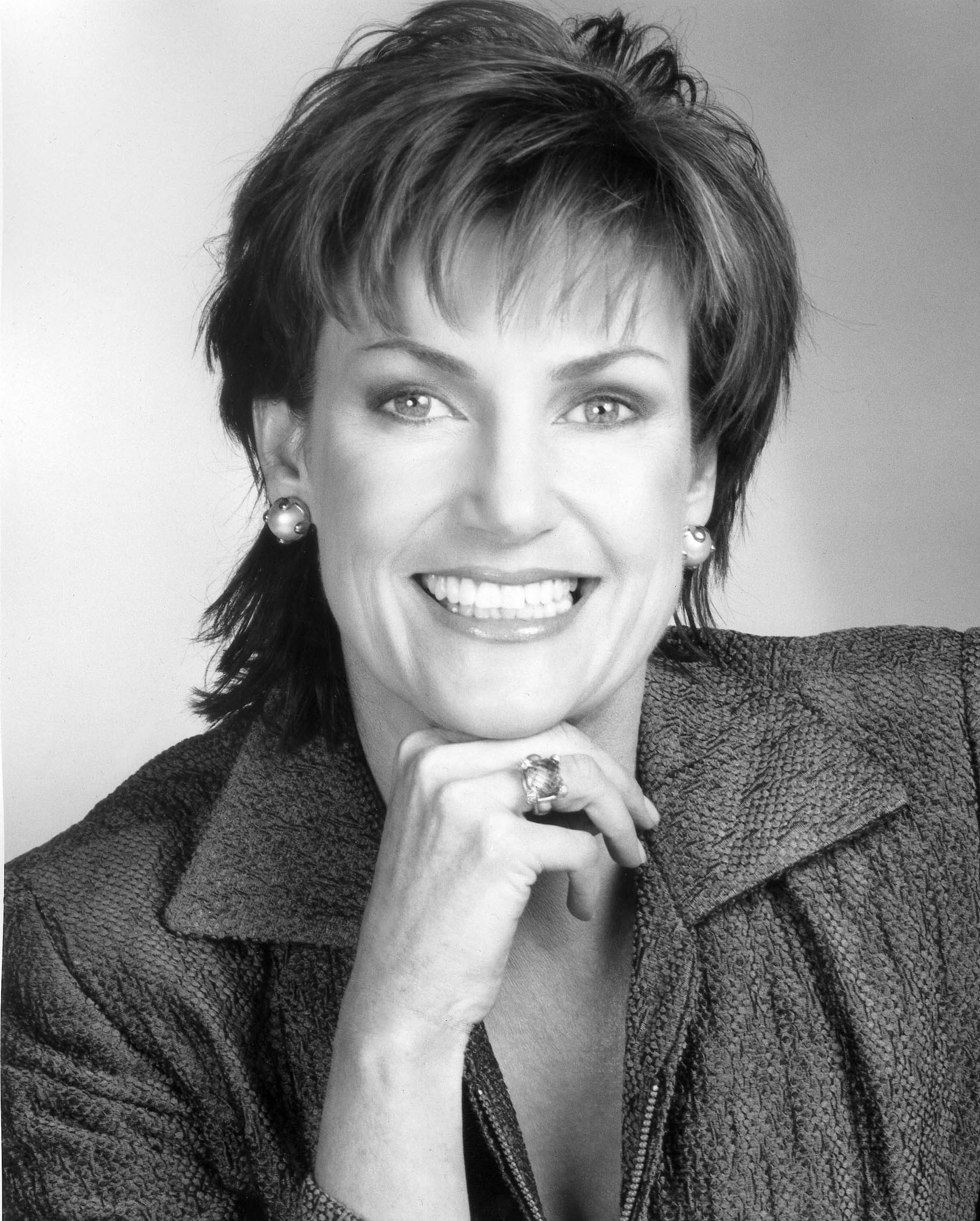
- Photo of McCabe by Gideon Lewin
- Education: Stanford University and Harvard Business School
- Occupation: Financial Services/Alternative Asset Management

Carrie A. McCabe is an investor, business builder, and C-suite executive. She has built five alternative asset management companies.

McCabe pioneered the institutionalization of the hedge fund industry, with a focus on large public plans and Fortune 50 corporations. She has served as the president and CEO of Blackstone Alternative Asset Management, FRM Americas, and Lasair Capital. McCabe founded Lasair Capital, a hedge fund firm in strategic partnership with General Electric’s Pension Trust. After Lasair Capital assets were sold in 2012, McCabe joined McKinsey & Company as senior advisor in the Asset Management and Private Equity practices.

McCabe graduated from Stanford University with a BA in Economics, and earned a Master in Business Administration degree from Harvard University’s Graduate School of Business.
