= Carrie Renfrew =

American writer

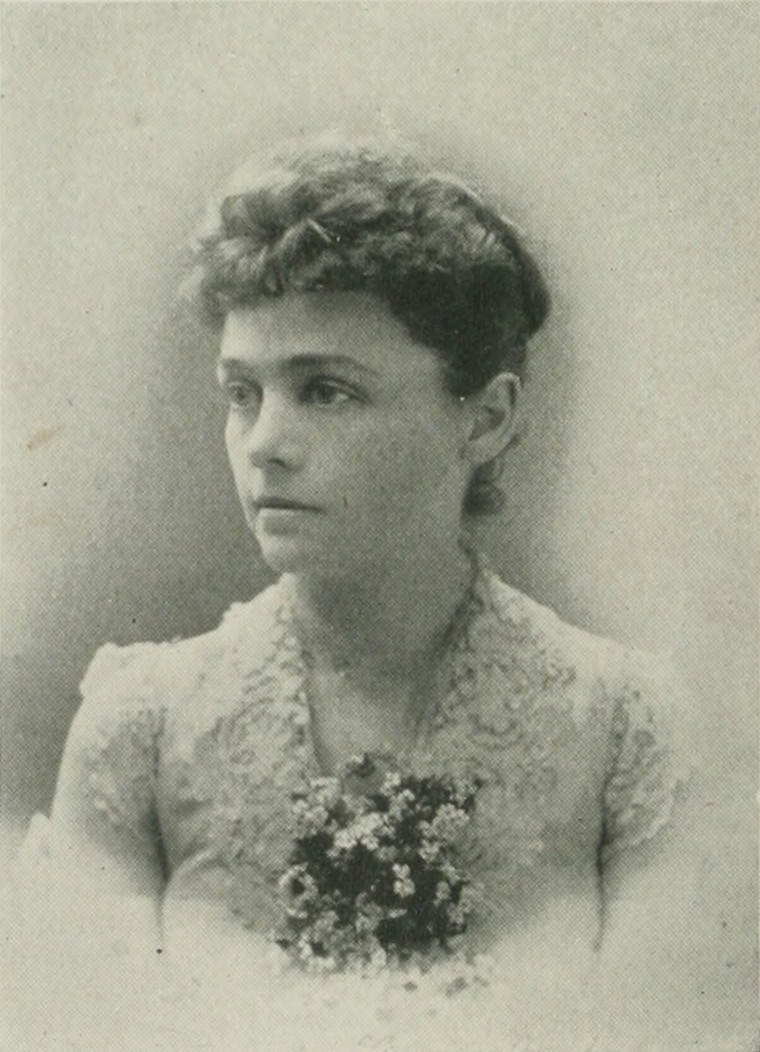
Carrie Renfrew, A Woman of the Century

Carolyn "Carrie" Renfrew (c. 1858 – July 6, 1948) was an American writer from Hastings, Nebraska.

Renfrew was born in Marseilles, Illinois, about 1858 to Silvester and Mercy Clark Renfrew, and moved to Nebraska with her family as a child. She began contributing to publications including the Chicago Inter Ocean in 1885. Her works include Songs of Hope (book of poems 1923); The Last of the Strozzi and The Lure (poetic plays 1923), Footprints Across the Prairie (novel, 1930), My Garden (poem collection, 1933), and John Golding's Vision (1938).

Though not broadly known, Renfrew was one of the most prominent persons from Hastings, being listed as a resident of the town in the 1930s Federal Writers' Project volume on Nebraska, and being the subject of biographical entries in the 1932 volume Nebraskana, and the 1890s American Women compilation, to which she contributed entries on Nebraska citizens.

Renfrew died in Hastings on July 6, 1948, survived by her brother Herman and sister Jennie Babcock.

== Bibliography ==
- Songs of Hope (1923, poetry)
- The Last of the Strozzi and The Lure (1923, two plays in one volume)
- Footprints Across the Prairie (Burton Publishing, 1930, first novel)
- My Garden (1933, poetry)
- John Golding's Vision (1938, novel)
- Plays: A Collection of Six Poetic Dramas (Burton Publishing, 1943)
