= Carrie Manfrino =

American oceanographer

Carrie Manfrino (born 1959) is an American oceanographer who is president and director of research of the Central Caribbean Marine Institute. Her research concerns coral and climate change.

== Education and career ==
Manfrino was born in New York. She received her PhD from the University of Miami's Rosenstiel School of Marine and Atmospheric Sciences in Marine Geology and Geophysics under the direction of Robert N. Ginsburg. She received geology degrees from the Colorado School of Mines and from the University of Colorado, Boulder.

In 1998, she founded the Central Caribbean Marine Institute, a Princeton, New Jersey-based marine research and education institute; in 2005 she founded the Little Cayman Research Centre, a field station and research center in the Cayman Islands. She also established the Coral Reef Conservancy. The Little Cayman Research Centre is a marine research facility for conducting tropical marine research and education. She is a Fulbright scholar and received the National Defense Science and Engineering Fellowship for her graduate research detecting sequences of coral reefs and sea level events to help understand the evolution of the Great Bahama Bank. She is also the recipient of the American Geological Institute Minority Scholarship, was selected by SCUBA Diving Magazine as an Oris Sea Hero, and is a Fellow of the Explorers Club.

She taught at Kean University from 2000 to 2016; in 2021, she joined the University College of the Cayman Islands as a research professor.

== Research ==
Manfrino's research, especially on the smallest of the Cayman Islands, Little Cayman, investigates whether corals can survive climate-change events including prolonged sea surface heating. She began her long-term study in the Caribbean in 1998, the year that the most severe El Nino recorded led to prolonged high sea surface temperatures. Coral reef mortality occurred globally and dire predictions about the future of corals continue to be the topic of scientific debate. Her long-term Caribbean study indicates that corals have the capacity to rebound from global stressors in places where local human pressures are low. Her work also demonstrates that avoiding ecosystem collapse requires high levels of local protection.

In 2015, as a Fulbright Scholar her research is an expedition across the atolls in the Republic of the Maldives exploring Coral Reefs as Prospects for Protecting the Republic of the Maldives from sea level rise. The work compares Caribbean and to some of the remote atolls in the Indian Ocean coral recovery potential and weighs the capacity for corals to outpace sea level rise. The Republic of the Maldives is the most threatened country on earth from climate change and rising sea level. Her work examines nature-based solutions to climate change impacts as the economically effective strategy for reducing risk. Her premise is that healthy reefs may be the most effective mitigation strategy against rising sea level in the Maldives. The work examines physical, ecological, and societal interactions that are critical to maintaining marine ecosystem resilience. She is a proponent of Nobel Prize economist (2009), Elinor Ostrom's work that has shown that common pool resources can be managed by local communities with certain characteristics.

In 2020, she conducted research on the current status of the ecosystem of Caribbean coral reefs in regard to microalgae and herbivore species.

In 2026, her h-index is 21.
