= Carrie Worthley =

Australian netball player

Personal information
- Born: 10 January 1983 (age 43)
- Occupation: Doctor
- Height: 1.82 m (6 ft 0 in)

Netball career
- Playing positions: GS, GA
Years	Club team	Apps
2001–2008	Adelaide Thunderbirds	
- Updated on 2009-03-30

Carrie Worthley (born 10 January 1983) is an Australian netball player. Worthley played for the Adelaide Thunderbirds in the Commonwealth Bank Trophy (2001–2007), and in the inaugural ANZ Championship season in 2008.
