= Carrie Farnsworth Fowle =

American missionary

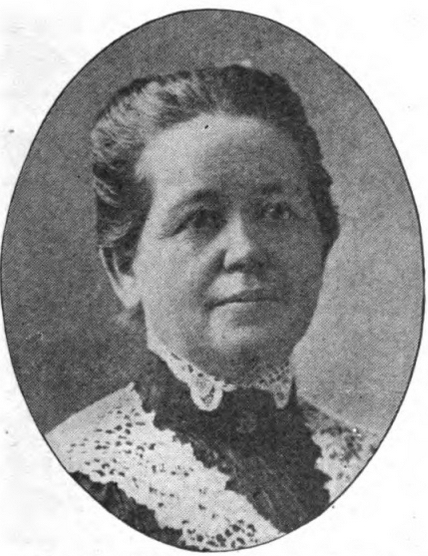
- Carrie Farnsworth Fowle, from a 1918 publication.
- Born: Caroline Palmer Farnsworth; November 27, 1854; Cesarea, Turkey
- Died: December 26, 1917 (aged 63); Baltimore, Maryland
- Occupation: Missionary

Carrie Farnsworth Fowle (November 27, 1854 – December 26, 1917), born Caroline Palmer Farnsworth, was an American missionary, born in Turkey.

== Early life and education ==
Caroline Palmer Farnsworth was born and raised in Cesarea, Turkey, the daughter of American missionaries Wilson Amos Farnsworth and Caroline Elizabeth Palmer Farnsworth, and the first American child born at Cesarea. Her sister Harriet Marie Farnsworth married Edward Leeds Gulick, of the Gulick family of missionaries in Hawaii.

Carrie Farnsworth spoke and understood Turkish fluently. She graduated from Mount Holyoke College in 1877, and earned a master's degree in music at Wellesley College.

== Career ==
Carrie Farnsworth Palmer returned to Turkey as a young bride soon after completing her studies at Wellesley. She had eight children while serving as a missionary with her husband at Cesarea and Talas. She conducted women's prayer and study groups, worked on building schools, supported an economic development project for Armenian refugee women to sell their lace and embroidery, and wrote about her work in Turkey for American publications, including The Century Magazine. She retired from the mission field in 1911, and lived in Baltimore in her later years.

== Personal life and legacy ==
Caroline Farnsworth married missionary James Luther Fowle in 1878; they had eight children born between 1879 and 1896. Her parents died in 1912 and 1913; her daughter Mary died in Turkey in 1916, and James Fowle died in May 1917. Carrie Farnsworth Fowle also died in 1917, a few months after her husband, aged 63 years.

The Fowle Family Papers at Williams College Archives include correspondence and other materials related to Carrie Farnsworth Fowle and her extended family. Records associated with her son Luther Richardson Fowle are in the American Research Institute in Istanbul and another collection at Williams College. In 1974, the Farnsworth-Fowle Fund was established by the overseas mission board of the United Church of Christ.

Fowle's granddaughter and namesake, Carolyn Fowle Green (1921–2011), was an aeronautical engineer during and after World War II. Another grandchild, Farnsworth Fowle (1915–2016), was a foreign correspondent for The New York Times, Columbia Broadcasting System (CBS), and Time magazine.
