= Carey =

Carey may refer to:

== Names ==
- Carey (given name), a list of people with this given name
- Carey (surname), about the surname
  - List of people with surname Carey

== Places ==
=== Canada ===
- Carey Group, British Columbia; in the Pacific
- Carey Island (Nunavut) in James Bay

=== United Kingdom ===
- Carey, Herefordshire (see List of places in Herefordshire)
- Carey Baptist Church, Preston, a Baptist church in England
- Carey Baptist Church, Reading, an independent Evangelical church in England
- Carey Street, a road in Central London

=== United States ===
- Carey, Alabama (see List of places in Alabama: A–C)
- Carey, California
- Carey, Georgia
- Carey, Idaho
- Carey, Ohio
- Carey, Texas
- Carey, Wisconsin
- Carey, Wyoming, a locale near the eastern end of Wyoming Highway 95
- Carey Block, historic building in Wyoming
- Carey Farm Site, a prehistoric archaeological site in Delaware
- Carey Formation, a geologic formation in Oklahoma
- Carey House (disambiguation), several
- Carey Lake, a lake in Cottonwood County, in the U.S. state of Minnesota

=== Elsewhere ===
- Carey Glacier, Antarctica
- Carey Gully, South Australia
- Carey Islands, an island group off Baffin Bay, Greenland
- Carey Island, Selangor, Malaysia

== Schools ==
- Carey Baptist Grammar School, Australia
- Carey Business School, the business school of Johns Hopkins University
- Carey College (disambiguation), several
- Carey High School (disambiguation), several
- Carey Law School, the law school of the University of Pennsylvania
- Francis King Carey School of Law, the law school of the University of Maryland
- William Carey University, a private Christian liberal arts college in Mississippi

== Other uses ==
- Captain Carey, U.S.A., a 1950 American film
- "Carey" (song), a 1971 song by the Canadian singer/songwriter Joni Mitchell
- Carey Bible, the first Roman Catholic version of the Bible printed in the United States

== See also ==
- Carrie (disambiguation)
- Carry (disambiguation)
- Cary (disambiguation)
- Karey (disambiguation)
- Justice Carey (disambiguation)
