= Cary =

Cary may refer to:

== Places ==
=== United States ===
- Cary, Illinois, a village, part of the Chicago metropolitan area
- Cary, Indiana, an unincorporated community
- Cary, Miami County, Indiana, a ghost town
- Cary, Maine, an unorganized township and former plantation
- Mount Cary, Massachusetts
- Cary, Mississippi, a town
- Cary, North Carolina, a town
- Cary Township, Wake County, North Carolina, containing the bulk of the town
- Cary, Wisconsin, a town

=== United Kingdom ===
- Cary (barony), County Antrim, Northern Ireland
- Castle Cary, Somerset, England
- River Cary, Somerset

=== Slovakia ===
- Čáry, a village

== People ==
- Cary (given name)
- Cary (surname)
- Cary family, a British aristocratic family, with a branch in Ireland

== Businesses ==
- Cary Audio Design, a manufacturer of vacuum tube and solid state audio components
- Cary Instruments, the optical instrumentation division of Varian Instruments
- Cary Safe Company, a defunct American safe company

== Railway stations ==
- Cary station (Metra), a Metra commuter rail station in Cary, Illinois
- Cary station (New Jersey), a historic former train station in Ledgewood, New Jersey
- Cary station (North Carolina), an Amtrak train station in Cary, North Carolina

== Other uses ==
- Cary Academy, an independent college-preparatory secondary school in Cary, North Carolina
- Cary Institute of Ecosystem Studies, a nonprofit organization
- Cary baronets, a title in the Baronetage of the United Kingdom
- List of storms named Cary, three tropical cyclones in the Pacific Ocean
- Cary High School, Cary, North Carolina

== See also ==
- Carey (disambiguation)
- Cari (disambiguation)
- Caries, a progressive destruction of any kind of bone structure
- Carie (disambiguation)
- Carrie (disambiguation)
- Carry (disambiguation)
- Kary (disambiguation)
