= Carrie =

Carrie may refer to:

== People ==
- Carrie (name), a female given name and occasionally a surname

== Places in the United States ==
- Carrie, Kentucky, an unincorporated community
- Carrie, Virginia, an unincorporated community
- Carrie Glacier, a glacier in Olympic National Park, Washington

== Arts and entertainment ==
- The Carrie media franchise by Stephen King, starting with his debut novel, and its adaptations:
  - Carrie (1974 novel)
  - Carrie (1976 film)
  - Carrie (musical), 1988
  - Carrie (2002 film)
  - Carrie (2013 film)
  - Carrie (TV series), 2026
- Carrie (1952 film), based on Sister Carrie, a 1900 novel by Theodore Dreiser
- Carrie (band), British based rock music band
- "Carrie" (Cliff Richard song), 1980 song by Cliff Richard
- "Carrie" (Europe song), 1987 song by Europe

== Other uses ==
- Carrie (mango), a mango cultivar
- Carrie (digital library), an online digital library project based at the University of Kansas
- Carrie Furnace, an abandoned blast furnace in Swissvale, Pennsylvania
- Tropical Storm Carrie, tropical cyclones named Carrie

== See also ==
- Carri, a surname and given name
- Carey (disambiguation)
- Carry (disambiguation)
- Cary (disambiguation)
- Carie (disambiguation)
- Carrie and Barry, a BBC sitcom
