= Cary (surname) =

Cary is a surname. Notable people with the surname include:

- Alexander Cary, Master of Falkland (born 1963), son of Lucius Cary, 15th Viscount Falkland
- Alice Cary (1820–1871), American poet
- Annie Louise Cary (1842–1921), American singer
- Anthony Cary, 5th Viscount of Falkland (1656–1694), Scottish nobleman
- Austin Cary (1865–1936), American forester
- Caitlin Cary (born 1968), American country singer
- Chad M. Cary, American admiral, director of the NOAA Commissioned Corps
- Charles P. Cary (1856–1943), American educator
- Constance Cary Harrison (1843–1920), American writer
- Diana Serra Cary (1918–2020), American actress
- Diane Cary, American actress
- Dick Cary (1916–1994), American jazz musician
- Elizabeth Cary, Lady Falkland (1584–1639), English poet, translator, and dramatist
- Elizabeth Cabot Agassiz, born Elizabeth Cabot Cary, (1822–1907), American educator
- Columba Cary-Elwes (1903–1994), British monk
- Frank T. Cary (1920–2006), American businessman
- Glover H. Cary (1885–1936), member of the U.S. House of Representatives from Kentucky
- Henry Cary (disambiguation), several people
- Hetty Cary (1836–1892), known for making the first three battle flags of the Confederacy
- Howard Cary (1908–1991), founder of Applied Physics Corporation (Cary Instruments)
- John Cary (disambiguation)
- Joyce Cary (1888–1957), Irish novelist and artist
- Liam Cary (born 1947), American Catholic bishop
- Lott Cary (1780–1828), African-American Baptist minister
- Lucius Cary, 2nd Viscount Falkland (c. 1610–1643), English politician, soldier, and author
- Lucius Cary, 10th Viscount Falkland (1803–1884), British colonial administrator
- Lucius Cary, 15th Viscount Falkland (born 1935), British Liberal Democrat politician
- Luther H. Cary (1823–1888), American politician
- Mary Ann Shadd (1823–1893), Quaker and social reformer, married name Cary
- Patrick Cary (c. 1623–1657), English poet, son of 1st Viscount Falkland
- Phillip Cary (born 1958), American Augustine scholar and philosophy professor
- Phoebe Cary (1824–1871), American poet
- Pierre Cary (1793–1857), French landowner and politician
- Reby Cary (1920–2018), American politician and writer
- Richard Cary (c. 1730–1789), Virginia judge
- Robert Cary (priest) (c. 1615–1688), English chronologist
- Robert Webster Cary (1890–1967), U.S. Medal of Honor recipient
- Sam Carey (disappeared 1903), American fugitive
- Samuel Fenton Cary (1814–1900), American politician and prohibitionist
- Tristram Cary (1925–2008), English composer
- Trumbull Cary (1787–1869), New York politician
- W. Sterling Cary (1927–2021), American Christian minister

== See also ==
- List of people with surname Carey, a similar name
- Cary (disambiguation)
- Cary (given name)
- Cari (name)
- Cary family
