= Cari (name) =

Cari is an English, Welsh and Spanish feminine given name and surname. As an English given name, Cari is diminutive form of Caroline and an alternate form of Carrie both derived from Karl. Cari is a Spanish given name that is a short form of Caridad, a derivative of Caritas. Notable people referred to by this name include the following:

== Given name ==
- Cari Beauchamp (1949–2023), American author and filmmaker
- Cari Champion (born 1975), American journalist
- Cari Cucksey, star of the television show Cash and Cari
- Cari Domínguez (handballer) (born 1992), Dominican handball player
- Cari M. Dominguez (born 1949), American administrator
- Cari Elise Fletcher, real name of Fletcher (singer) (born 1994), American actress, singer, and songwriter
- Cari Groce, American tennis coach
- Cari Higgins (born 1976), American racing cyclist
- Cari Johnson (born 1977), Canadian sport shooter
- Cari Lekebusch (born 1972), Swedish music producer
- Cari Lightner woman whose death led her mother to found Mothers Against Drunk Driving in 1980
- Cari Read (born 1970), Canadian synchronised swimmer
- Cari Roccaro (born 1994), American football player
- Cari Batson Thomas, United States Coast Guard rear admiral
- Caris Tiivel (born 1993), Australian model and beauty queen
- Cari Tuna, American nonprofit businessperson
- Cari Zalloni (1937–2012), Austrian designer

== Nickname ==
- Cari Corrigan, nickname of Catherine Margaret Corrigan (born 1972), American scientist
- Cari Q, stagename of Cari Quoyeser (born 1990), American musician

== Surname ==
- Gaetano Cari (fl. 18th century), Italian scientific instrument maker
- Joseph Cari Jr. (born 1952), American investor
- Piero Cari (born 2007), Peruvian footballer

== See also ==
- Cari (disambiguation)
- Cai (surname)
- Cali (surname)
- Car (surname)
- Cara (given name)
- Card (surname)
- CariDee English
- Carie Graves
- Caris (name)
- Carl (name)
- Carli (given name)
- Carli (surname)
- Caro (surname)
- Carpi (surname)
- Carr (surname)
- Carri
- Cary (given name)
- Cary (surname)
- Chari (surname)
- Kari (name)
