= Carro (disambiguation) =

Carro may refer to:

- Carro, municipality in the province of La Spezia, Italy
- Carro (surname), Spanish surname
- Carro Morrell Clark (1867–1950), American publisher and businesswoman
- Carro Pass, James Ross Island, Antarctica
- Carro Quemado, village in Argentina
- Refuge du Carro, refuge in the department of Savoie, France

== See also ==
- Carro armato
- Caro (disambiguation)
- Carra (disambiguation)
