= John Cary (disambiguation) =

John Cary (c. 1754–1835) was an English cartographer

John Cary may also refer to:

- John Cary (died 1395), Chief Baron of the Exchequer and MP for Devon
- John Cary (MP), in 1397, MP for Salisbury (UK Parliament constituency)
- John Cary (valet) (1729?–1843), African-American slave and George Washington's valet
- John Cary (businessman) ((1649–1722?), Bristol merchant and writer on trade during the eighteenth century
- John Robert Cary (born 1953), American physicist
- John W. Cary (1817–1895), American politician

== See also ==
- John B. Cary Elementary School
- John Carey (disambiguation)
- John Kerry, politician
