= Carey Baptist Church =

Carey Baptist Church may refer to the following churches in England:

- Carey Baptist Church, Reading, Berkshire
- Carey Baptist Church, Preston, Lancashire
