= Carie =

Carie may refer to:

- Carie, Missouri
- Carie Graves
- Carie, an Italian No Cav documentary concerning the Apuan Alps

== See also ==
- Caries, an instance of tooth decay
- Carrie (disambiguation)
- Cary (disambiguation)
- Carey (disambiguation)
- Carry (disambiguation)
