= Grande Aiguille Rousse =

Mountain in France

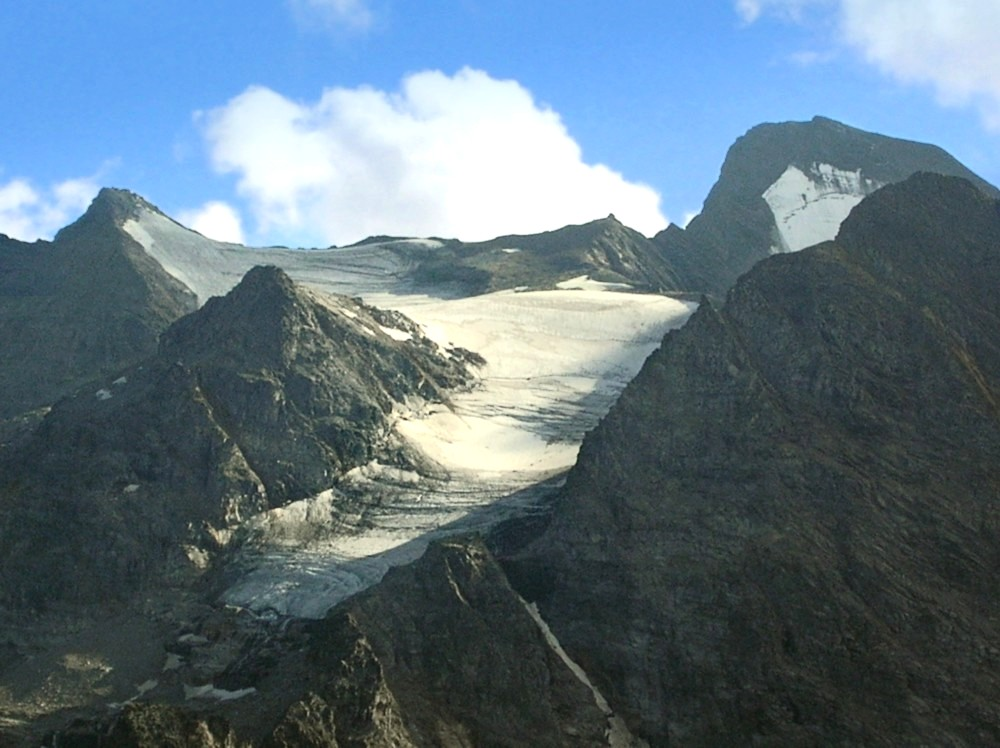
- View of the Grande Aiguille Rousse (right) and the Italian glaciers of Carro from the east.

Highest point
- Elevation: 3,482 m (11,424 ft)
- Prominence: 391 m (1,283 ft)
- Listing: 3000 m Alps
- Coordinates: 45°25′58″N 7°06′35″E

Naming
- English translation: Great Red Needle
- Language of name: French
- Pronunciation: [gʀɑ̃d egɥij ʀus]

Geography
- Location within Alps
- Location: Savoie, France
- Parent range: Graian Alps

Geology
- Mountain type: Schistes lustrés

Climbing
- First ascent: Édouard Rochat and Blanc le Greffier on 31 July 1878

The Grande Aiguille Rousse is a mountain peak of the Graian Alps in Savoie, France, situated between the Maurienne and Tarentaise valleys near the Italian border. Reaching an altitude of 3,482 meters (11,424 feet), it exceeds its junior to the west, the Petite Aiguille Rousse, by just 50 m (160 ft). Not far from Levanna, the Grande Aiguille Rousse overlooks Serrù Lake and the Gran Paradiso National Park in Italy.

== Geography ==
At the crossroads of the Maurienne and Tarentaise valleys, not far from the Col de l'Iseran, the Grande Aiguille Rousse lies in the region where the waters that flow through these great alpine valleys diverge. It is part of a series of mountains that define the frontier between Savoie and the Italian regions of Piedmont and the Aosta Valley, including such peaks as the Pointe de Ronce, the Bessanèse, the Levanna, and the Pointe de la Galise. The Grande Aiguille Rousse is shared by the communes of Val-d'Isère and Bonneval-sur-Arc.

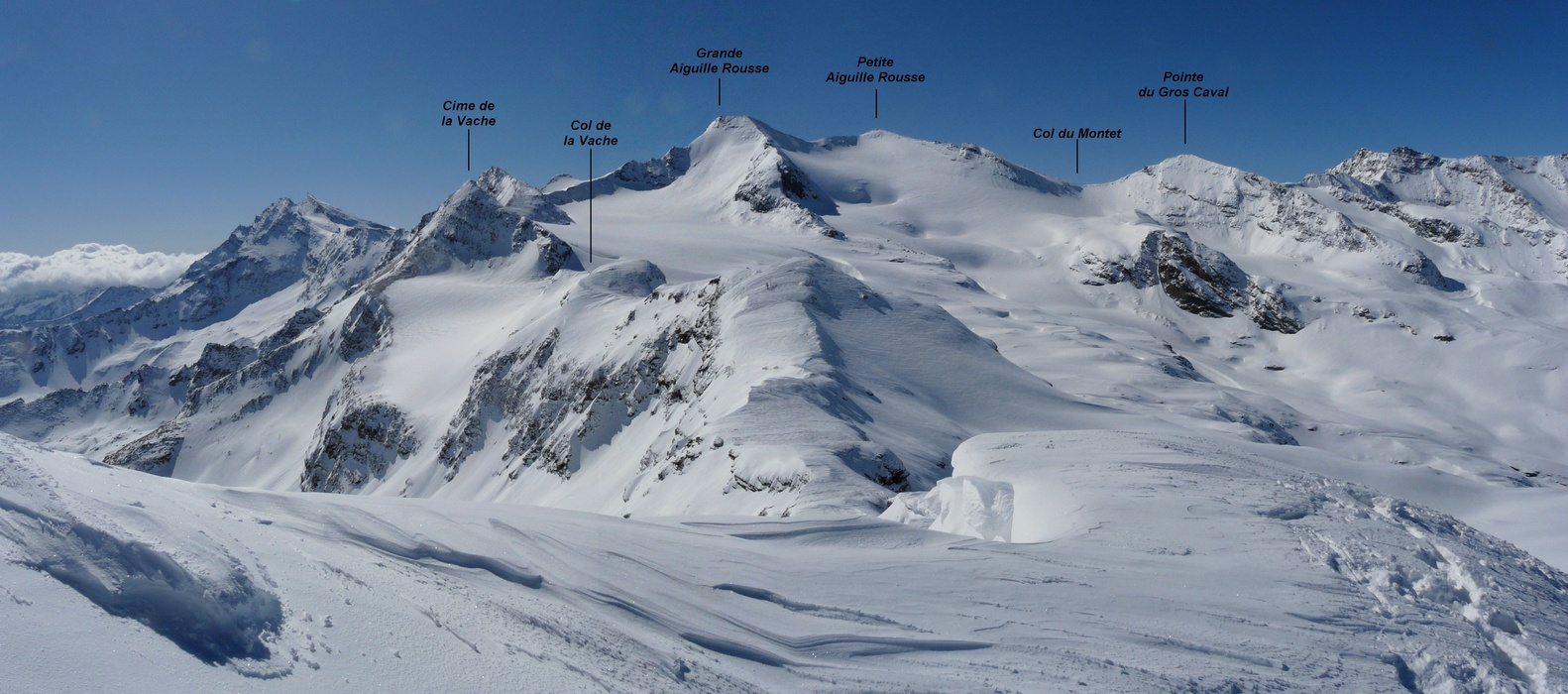
Northern view of the Grande Aiguille Rousse and its neighboring peaks, taken from the summit of the Grand Cocor at 3,034 m (9,954 ft).

== Ascent ==
The most common route for hiking up the mountain is from Val-d'Isère via the Prariond Refuge, or alternatively from Bonneval-sur-Arc via the Carro Refuge or the Col du Montet mountain pass. To reach the summit from Italy, it is customary to begin at the Pian della Ballotta Refuge, take the Col de la Lose pass at 2,957 m (9,701 ft), cross the border to the Sources de l'Isère Glacier at 2,800 m (9,200 ft), and finally arrive at the summit.

=== Refuges ===
The mountain refuges which can be used as a starting point for the ascent or simply for a visit to the mountain are the following:

- Prariond Refuge - 2,324 m (7,625 ft)
- Pian della Ballotta Refuge - 2,470 m (8,100 ft)
- Carro Refuge - 2,759 m (9,052 ft)
