= Carpi (surname) =

Carpi is an Italian surname. Notable people with the surname include:

- Aldo Carpi, Italian painter
- Fabio Carpi, Italian film director
- Fiorenzo Carpi (1918–1997), Italian composer and pianist
- Giovan Battista Carpi, Italian comic artist
- Jacopo Berengario da Carpi, Italian anatomist
- Solomon Joseph Carpi (1715–?), Italian-Jewish writer
- Zachariah Carpi, Italian-Jewish revolutionary

== See also ==
- Carpi (disambiguation)
- Cari (name)
- Carli (given name)
