= Don Wedge =

American football official (1929–2012)

Donald R. Wedge (August 13, 1929 – April 20, 2012), a native of Carey, Ohio, was an official in the National Football League (NFL) for 24 years from 1972 to 1996. He worked as a back judge, side judge, and referee wearing uniform number 28 for most of his career. He wore number 87 at the beginning of his NFL tenure before switching to 28 following the retirement of Bill Schleibaum.

He officiated at side judge in Super Bowl XXII. He also officiated in 18 other post season games including two Pro Bowls.

Wedge was born and raised in northwest Ohio. He graduated from Carey High School in 1947. He then graduated from Ohio Wesleyan University in 1951 where he played fullback. Don set several records while playing full back at Ohio Wesleyan including five touchdowns in a single game and 15 touchdowns in a single season (1950). He was named All-Ohio College and Little All-American Fullback and was inducted into the OWU Hall of Fame. He received the Lifetime Achievement Award from the Ohio Pro Am in 1993.

Wedge officiated both football and basketball games at the college level from 1956 to 1976. He worked the 1970 Rose Bowl and Big Ten Conference games as a back judge and referee prior to his NFL experience. His other college officiating included Mid Am, SEC, Metro, OVC and NCAA tournaments. He was also a National Basketball Association (NBA) official for two years.

In 1995, the Ohio Wesleyan Athletics Hall of Fame inducted Wedge. He was a lifetime member of the OAFO, OABO, Fellowship of Christian Athletes, NFL Alumni, and the NFL Players Association. He was also a member of the Carey Ohio High School Hall of Fame.
