= Carey High School =

Carey High School may refer to:

- Carey High School (Carey, Idaho), Carey, Idaho
- Carey High School (Carey, Ohio), Carey, Ohio
- Carey High School (Texas), Carey, Texas
- H. Frank Carey Junior-Senior High School, Franklin Square, New York
