= Car (surname) =

Car is a surname. Notable people with the surname include:

- Nicole Car (born 1985), Australian operatic soprano
- Marko Car (disambiguation), multiple people
- Mirosław Car (1960–2013), Polish footballer
- Roberto Car (born 1947), Italian physicist
- Stanisław Car (1882–1938), Polish politician
- Viktor Car Emin (1870–1963), Croatian writer

== See also ==
- Car (disambiguation)
- Carr (surname)
- Cari (name)
- Duje Ćaleta-Car (born 1996), Croatian professional footballer
