= Cary (given name) =

Cary is a given name. Notable people with the name include:

- Cary Angeline (born 1997), American football player
- Cary Brothers (born 1974), American singer-songwriter
- Cary Elwes (born 1962), English actor and writer
- Cary Joji Fukunaga (born 1977), American film director
- Cary Grant (1904–1986), English-American actor
- Cary Guffey (born 1972), American former child actor
- Cary Huang (born 1997), American animator and YouTuber
- Cary Kaplan, (born 1969), sports marketer
- Cary Kwok (born 1975), Hong Kong-born British artist
- Cary B. Lewis (1888–1946), African American sportswriter
- Cary Middlecoff (1921–1998), American professional golfer
- Cary Millholland Parker (1902–2001), landscape architect
- Cary Stayner (born 1961), convicted American serial killer and older brother of kidnapping victim Steven Stayner.
- Cary Wolfe (born 1959), academic and philosopher

== See also ==
- Cary (disambiguation)
- Cary (surname)
- Cary-Hiroyuki Tagawa (1950–2025), Japanese-born American actor, film producer, and martial artist
- Cari (name)
- Carry (name)
