= Admiral Thomas =

Admiral Thomas may refer to:

- Cari Batson Thomas (fl. 1980s–20210s), U.S. Coast Guard rear admiral
- Charles Thomas (Canadian admiral) (born 1936), Royal Canadian Navy vice admiral
- Charles Mitchell Thomas (1846–1908), U.S. Navy rear admiral
- Charles W. Thomas (captain) (1903–1973), U.S. Coast Guard rear admiral
- Chauncey Thomas Jr. (1850–1919), U.S. Navy rear admiral
- David M. Thomas Jr. (born 1958), U.S. Navy rear admiral
- Davyd Thomas (born 1956), Royal Australian Naval Reserve rear admiral
- Gerald Eustis Thomas (1929–2019), U.S. Navy rear admiral
- Karl O. Thomas (born 1963), U.S. Navy vice admiral
- Paul F. Thomas (born 1963), U.S. Coast Guard vice admiral
- Richard Thomas (Royal Navy officer) (1932–1998), British Royal Navy admiral
- Richard Darton Thomas (1777–1857), British Royal Navy admiral
- William Nathaniel Thomas (1892–1971), U.S. Navy rear admiral
