= Carry (name) =

Carry is an English and German feminine given name, nickname and surname, which serves as an alternate form of Carrie and a diminutive form of several names including Carola, Carol, Carlotta, Carolin, Carolina and Caroline. Notable people referred to by this name include the following:

== Given name ==
- Carry Somers (born 1966), British fashion designer

== Nickname ==
- Carry Geijssen, nickname of Carolina Cornelia Catharina Geijssen (born 1947), Dutch speed skater
- Carry Hauser, nickname of Carl Maria Hauser (1895–1985), Austrian painter, stage set designer and poet
- Carry van Bruggen, whose birthname was Caroline Lea de Haan and pen name was Justine Abbing (1881–1932), Dutch writer
- Cash and Carry Pyle, an alternate nickname of C. C. Pyle, whose full name was Charles C. Pyle (1882–1939), American theater owner, sports agent and entrepreneur
- CarryMinati, whose birth name is Ajey Nagar (born 1999), Indian YouTuber

== Surname ==
- David Carry (born 1981), Scottish swimmer
- Julius Carry (1952–2008), American actor
- Scoops Carry, nickname of George Dorman Carry (1915–1970), American jazz musician
- Sharon Carry (born 1950), Canadian education administrator
- Sincere Carry (born 1999), American basketball player

== See also ==
- Carry (disambiguation)
- Cardy (surname)
- Carey (given name)
- Carly (name)
- Carr (surname)
- Carré (surname)
- Carri
- Carro (surname)
- Carty
- Cary (given name)
- Corry (surname)
- Curry (surname)
- McCarry
