= Carri =

Carri is both a surname and a given name. Notable people with the name include:

== Surname ==
- Albertina Carri (born 1973), Argentine screenwriter, film director and producer
- Daniele Delli Carri (born 1971), Italian footballer

== Given name ==
- Carri Leigh Goodwin (1989–2009)
- Carri Munden, English fashion designer

== See also ==
- Cari (name)
- Carrie (disambiguation)
- Carry (name)
