= Carey Exempted Village School District =

School district in Ohio, United States

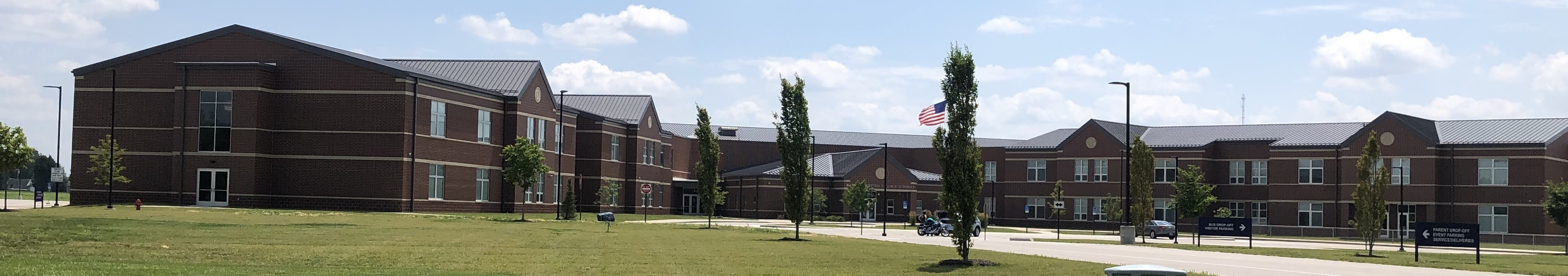

Address
- 357 E South St Carey, Ohio, 43316; United States
- Coordinates: 40°57′7″N 83°22′54″W

District information
- Grades: K - 12
- Superintendent: Mark Vehre
- NCES District ID: 3904526

Students and staff
- Enrollment: 877
- Staff: 58.14 (on an FTE basis)
- Student–teacher ratio: 14.65

Other information
- Telephone: (419) 396-7922
- Fax: (419) 396-3158
- Website: www.careyschools.org

The Carey Exempted Village School District is a public school district in Wyandot County, Ohio, United States, based in Carey, Ohio.

== Schools ==
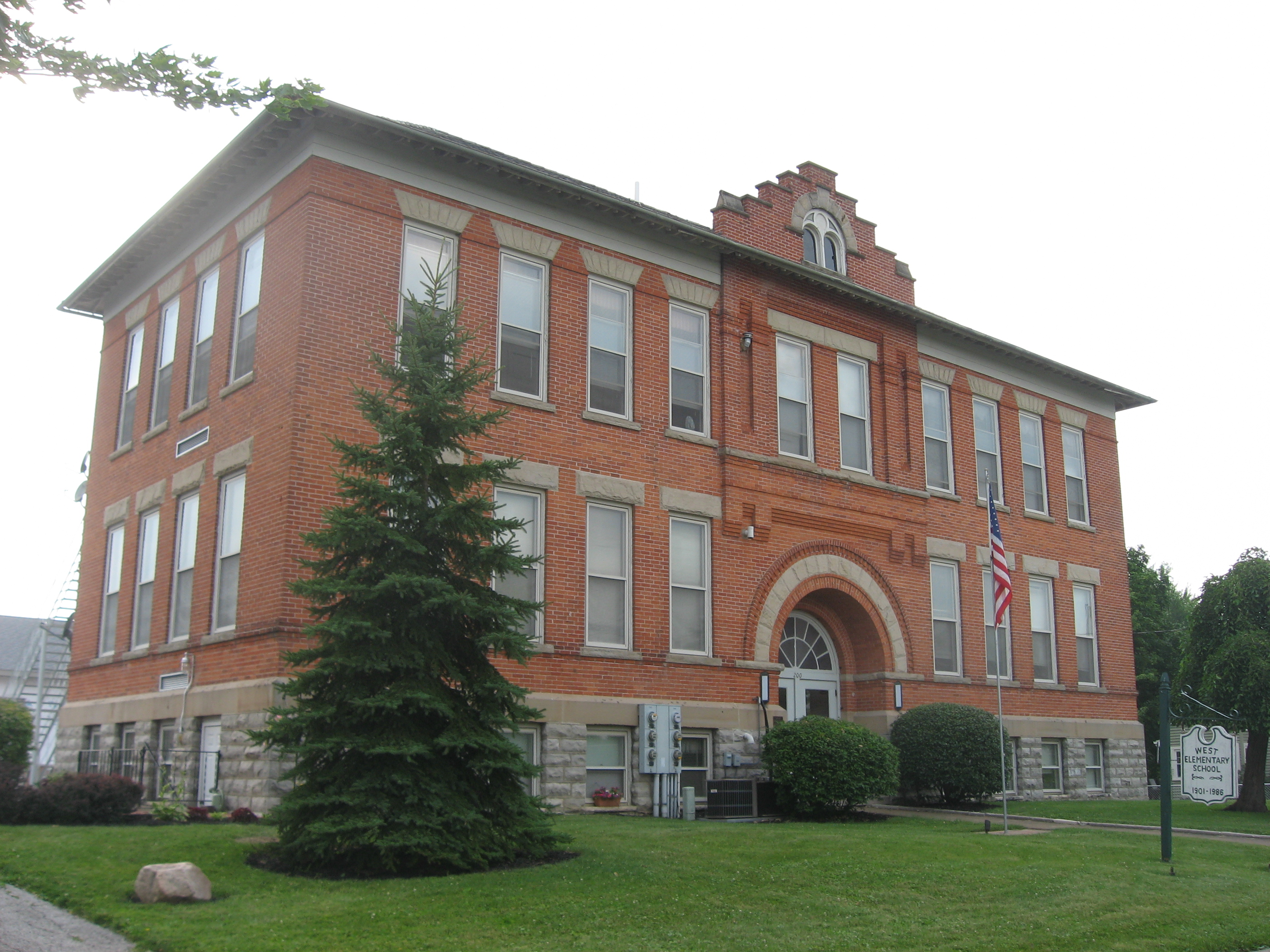
The old West End Elementary School

The Carey Exempted Village School District has one elementary school and one high school. The high school and elementary school were demolished on July 25, 2016. A new combination of the high school and elementary school was opened off of South Vance Street for the 2016–2017 school year.

=== Elementary school ===
- Carey Elementary

=== High school ===
- Carey High School
