= Carpis =

Carpis or Karpis is an ancient Greek and Roman place name, and may refer to:

- Carpis (Greek: Κάρπίς), or Carpi, a town of Zeugitana, on the Gulf of Carthage, north-east of Maxula, and probably identical with Aquae Calidae
- Carpis (Greek: Κάρπίς), a river which, according to Herodotus, flowed from the upper country of the Ombricans northward into the Ister (Danube), whence it has been supposed that this river is the same as the Dravus
- Carpis, a Martian canal

== See also ==
- Carpi people
- Carpi (disambiguation)
- Karpis
