= Carpi =

Carpi may refer to:

== Places ==
- Carpi, Emilia-Romagna, a large town in the province of Modena, central Italy
  - Roman Catholic Diocese of Carpi
- Carpi (Africa), a city and former diocese of Roman Africa, now a Roman Catholic titular see

== People ==
- Carpi (people), an ancient people of the Carpathian region
- Carpi (surname), an Italian surname

== Other ==
- Carpal bones, also known by the Latin term ossa carpi
- Carpi, plural form of carpus, the cluster of bones in the hand between the radius and ulna and the metacarpus
- Carpi FC 1909, an Italian association football club

== See also ==
- Carpis (disambiguation)
