= John Carey =

John Carey may refer to:

- John Carey (botanist), (1797–1880), British botanist
- John Carey (Celticist), American scholar
- John Carey (congressman) (1792–1875), United States representative from Ohio; member of the Ohio House of Representatives
- John Carey (courtier) (c. 1491–1552), courtier to King Henry VIII
- John Carey (critic) (1934–2025), British literary critic
- John Carey (Australian politician) (born 1974), Western Australian politician
- John Carey (Ohio state legislator) (born 1959), Republican member of the Ohio House of Representatives; former Ohio state senator
- John Carey (Oklahoma politician), member of the Oklahoma House of Representatives
- John Carey (Wisconsin politician) (1839–1888)
- John Carey, 2nd Earl of Dover (1608–1677), English peer
- John Carey, 3rd Baron Hunsdon (c. 1556–1617), English peer and politician
- John L. Carey (died 1852), editor of the Baltimore American
- Johnny Carey (1919–1995), Irish footballer and manager
- John Carey (animator), staff member of Warner Bros. Cartoons
- John Carey (Oregon politician), member of the Oregon Territorial Legislature, 1852

== See also ==
- John Cary (disambiguation)
- John Kerry (born 1943)
