= Carey House =

Carey House may refer to:

- Carey House (Denison, Iowa), United States
- Carey House (Wichita, Kansas), United States
- J. W. Carey House, Prosser, Washington, United States
