= Nambikkai =

Registered charitable trust in Chennai

The Nambikkai Foundation is an Indian charity founded 1978 to provide education and employment resources for deaf people. It was founded by Ian Stillman and his wife.
