= Ian Stillman =

British missionary

Ian Stillman (1950 – 25 May 2016) was a deaf British aid worker from Reading, Berkshire, England, in the United Kingdom, whose imprisonment and subsequent release from prison in India garnered media attention. Together with his wife Sue, he founded the Nambikkai Foundation.

Stillman's mission was sponsored by the Carey Baptist Church.

Stillman attended Crosfields School in Reading and then Leighton Park School.

According to the BBC, Stillman, "a deaf charity worker who has lived in India for nearly 30 years, was arrested (in 2001) after cannabis was found in a taxi he had hired."

Stillman's attorney's claimed that Stillman, who is deaf and well known in India for his charitable work with the deaf, was the victim of "a gross miscarriage of justice." Stephen Jakobi of the advocacy organisation Fair Trials International told the press that "It is the most horrific case I've ever seen of an innocent man being done down by law."

The United Kingdom Council on Deafness collected tens of thousands of signatures on a petition to the Indian government asking for Stillman's release.

He was released following successful intervention by Prime Minister Tony Blair and the Foreign Secretary.

Stillman died on 25 May 2016 in Norfolk, England.

== Interview ==
- "Free at last! Jonathan Stephen interviews Ian Stillman for EN," Evangelical Now, March 2003.
