= Carro (surname) =

Carro is a Spanish surname. People with this name include:

- Fernando Carro (born 1992), Spanish middle-distance runner
- John Carro (born 1927), US lawyer and judge
- Leandro Carro (1890–1967), Spanish communist leader
- Luciana Carro (born 1981), Canadian actress
- María J. Carro (born 1961), Spanish mathematician
- Marta Carro (born 1991), Spanish footballer
- Osvaldo Carro (born 1973), Uruguayan football
- Jean de Carro (1770–1857), Swiss-born physician

== See also ==
- Carlo (name)
- Carry (name)
