= Carrie, Virginia =

Unincorporated community in Virginia, United States

Carrie
- Unincorporated community
- Location within Virginia
- Coordinates: 37°01′56″N 82°12′23″W
- Country: United States
- State: Virginia
- County: Dickenson County

Carrie is an unincorporated community in Dickenson County, Virginia, United States.

== History ==
A post office was established at Carrie in 1901, and remained in operation until it was discontinued in 1961.
