= John Cary (MP) =

14th-century English politician

John Cary was the member of the Parliament of England for Salisbury for the parliament of September 1397.
