= John Robert Cary =

Ph.D. University of California, Berkeley 1979

Professor John Robert Cary PhD, CEO
- Born: March 15, 1953 (age 73); Livermore, California
- Known for: Separatrix Crossing, Plasma Acceleration
- Awards: Fellow, American Physical Society
- Scientific career
- Fields: Plasma physics
- Workplaces: University of Colorado Boulder, Tech-X Corporation
- Thesis: Nonlinear Wave Phenomena in Vlasov Plasma: A Lie Transform Approach (1979)
- Doctoral advisor: Allan N. Kaufman

John Robert Cary is a professor of physics at the University of Colorado Boulder and CTO of Tech-X Corporation, which he co-founded in 1994.

== Biography and education ==
In 1973 Cary earned a BA cum laude in physics and a BA cum laude in mathematics at the University of California, Irvine. He earned his MS in 1975 and Ph.D. in physics in 1979 at the University of California, Berkeley.

Cary worked at the Los Alamos National Laboratory (1978-1980) and then the Institute for Fusion Studies at the University of Texas, Austin (1980-1984), prior to joining the faculty at the University of Colorado in 1984. At Colorado, he has served as department chair (1992-1995), center director, and faculty mentor.

== Research ==
Cary personally has worked in a wide variety of areas related to plasma and beam physics, such as nonlinear dynamics, 3D magnetohydrodynamic equilibria, magnetic reconnection, laser plasma acceleration, fusion plasma physics, but also in other fields, such as photonic structures, beam physics, computational algorithms, and electromagnetics of structures. As of this writing (October, 2020), Cary has written hundreds of scientific papers, which have collectively been cited over 10,000 times, with 18 papers having 100 citations or more. Data from one of his papers appeared on the cover of Nature, and Nature listed this work as one of the highlights of 2004. The Russian mathematician Arnold listed separatrix crossing as one of the 10 mathematical discoveries of the 1980s.

== Other professional work ==
In 1994, he co-founded Tech‑X Corporation, which concentrates on computational applications for science and engineering.

== Honors ==
Cary is a fellow of the American Physical Society and a senior member of the Institute of Electrical and Electronics Engineers (IEEE). He is also the recipient of the 2019 IEEE Nuclear and Plasma Sciences Section Particle Accelerator Science and Technology Award, the 2016 IEEE Nuclear and Plasma Sciences Section Charles K. Birdsall Award for Contributions to Computational Nuclear and Plasma Sciences, and the 2015 John Dawson Prize for Numerical Simulation of Plasmas - Lifetime. He has also won awards in visualization, include the 2007 Buneman award for Best Still Visualization, and the 2008 and 2011 Awards for Visualization of the Scientific Discovery through Advanced Computation program.

Cary has chaired or served on multiple committees of the American Physical Society and the IEEE. He has served as associate editor for APS/AIP journals including the Reviews of Modern Physics. He was elected chair of the Division of Plasma Physics of the APS in 2018
