= Sam Carey =

American Old West outlaw

- Born: United States
- Status: never apprehended, now deceased
- Died: Unknown (sometime after 1903)
- Other names: "Laughing" Sam Carey; Laughing Dick Carey
- Occupation: Outlaw

"Laughing" Sam Carey, possibly also Laughing Dick Carey, was one of the least known American Old West outlaws who was a member of the loosely knit Hole-in-the-Wall Gang during the latter part of the 19th century. Both of the above names are listed in many outlaw accounts from the day.

== Background ==
Although Sam Carey is mentioned often in recorded exploits of the gangs operating out of the Hole-in-the-Wall pass, located in Johnson County, Wyoming, very little is known about him. Historian Roy O'Dell has done extended research into Carey's identity. In addition to his work, authors James D. Horan and Paul Sann mentioned Laughing Sam Carey in their book, Pictorial History of the Wild West. In a New York World article, dated March 15, 1903, Carey is mentioned as being one of the most celebrated inhabitants of the Hole-in-the-Wall hideout, and is described as Wyoming's most dangerous desperado.

As a boy, it is believed that Carey acted as a messenger and camp servant to Butch Cassidy and his gang. As a teenager he rode with a gang led by the little-known outlaw Otto Chenoworth. In the 1923 book History of Natrona County Wyoming, the short-lived career of the Chenoworth Gang was documented. He and his gang were less than successful, with the gang breaking up and Chenoworth being committed to a sanitarium in South Dakota, from which he was later released to his mother. Carey returned to the Hole-in-the-Wall after the gang's breakup.

Carey then rode, off and on, with a number of the gangs considered part of the Hole in the Wall Gang, to include Cassidy's Wild Bunch and Black Jack Ketchum's gang. Carey was well known in his own time, and often associated with stories of the outlaw exploits originating from the Hole-in-the-Wall. However, by 1903, almost all of the gang members best known to operate from there were either dead or in prison, with Carey never being captured to anyone's knowledge. Eventually, beginning after 1903, he simply faded from history. His whereabouts after the downfall of the Hole in the Wall Gang are not known, nor is the date or year of his death.

== See also ==
- List of fugitives from justice who disappeared
