= Carey Block =

- U.S. National Register of Historic Places
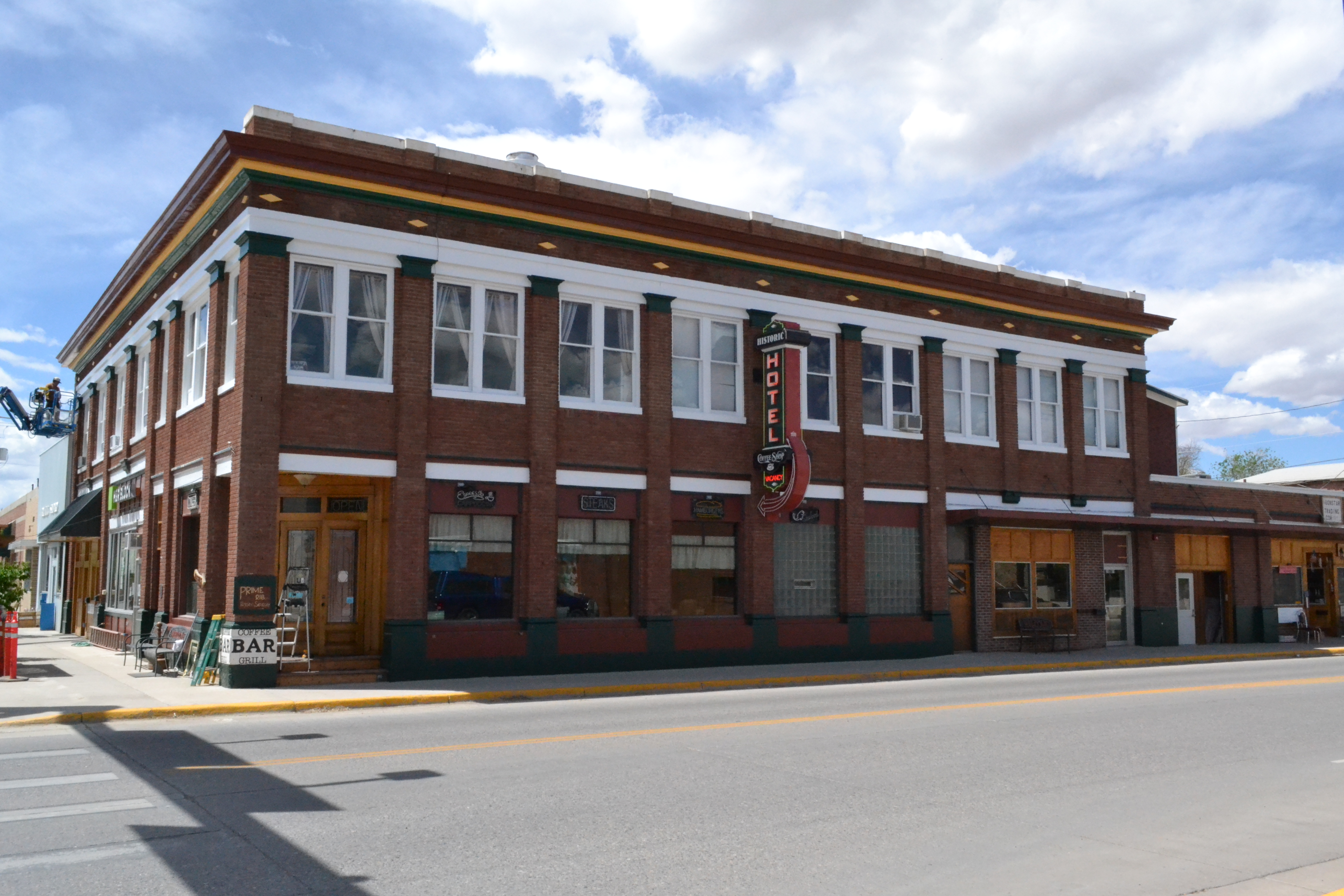

- Location within Wyoming Location within the United States
- Location: 602 Greybull Avenue, Greybull, Wyoming
- Coordinates: 44°29′21″N 108°3′20″W
- Area: less than one acre
- Built: 1916
- Built by: Gagnon & Co.
- Architectural style: Early Commercial
- NRHP reference No.: 09001110
- Added to NRHP: December 18, 2009

The Carey Block—located at 602 Greybull Ave. in Greybull, Wyoming, United States—is a building that was built in 1916. It has also been known as Hurst Block, First State Bank, and Greybull Hotel .

It was listed on the National Register of Historic Places in 2009.

It includes a two-story portion that is 75 by 80 feet (23 m × 24 m) in plan and a one-story wing. It was built by Gagnon & Co. in Early Commercial style.
