= Carey College =

Carey College may refer to the following:

- Carey College, Colombo
- Carey Baptist College, New Zealand
- Carey Baptist College, Perth
- Carey College, New Zealand
- William Carey College, United States
