= Cary Kwok =

- 郭紹恆
- Born: 1975 (age 50–51); Hong Kong
- Education: Central Saint Martins College of Art and Design
- Known for: Detailed drawings
- Website: http://www.carykwok.com/

Cary Kwok (Siu Hang Cary Kwok, traditional Chinese: 郭紹恆; simplified Chinese: 郭绍恒; pinyin: Guō Shào Héng; Cantonese Yale: Gwok Siu-Hang) is a Hong Kong-born London-based British artist who specialises in fine detailed blue biro (ball point pen) drawings and humorous erotic works.

Kwok attended a footwear course in Hong Kong where he learned his shoe making skills before moving to London to further his studies. He spent six years at Central Saint Martins College of Art and Design studying fashion at BA (Hons) and MA levels, graduating in 2001 with a Master of Arts in Fashion Design: Womenswear.

His subjects often vary from male nude to period fashions. Hairstyles and shoes are also among his favorite subjects.

He is represented by Herald St, London Gallery in London and has exhibited internationally in London, Miami, New York City, Tokyo, Zurich, Paris, Hong Kong and Geneva with galleries such as Herald St, Galerie Emmanuel Perrotin, Hauser & Wirth, FLAG Art Foundation, Institute of Contemporary Arts, Tate Britain, White Columns, Nasu Taro, Opening Ceremony and Hard Hat.
