= Refuge du Prariond =

Coordinates: 45°27′21″N 7°04′16″E

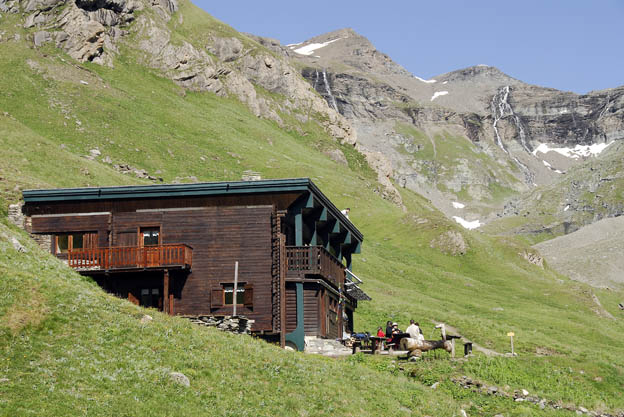
Refuge de Prariond, up Val d'Isère. Vanoise National Park

Refuge du Prariond is a mountain refuge in the Alps. It is situated at an altitude of 2,324 meters above sea level.
