= Carey Baptist Church, Reading =

Carey Baptist Church
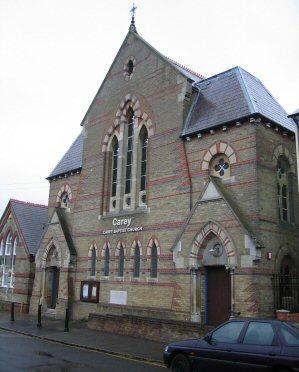
- Carey Baptist Church, front facade

- Location within Reading
- 51°27′11.1″N 0°58′47.13″W
- Location: Reading
- Country: England
- Denomination: Baptist
- Website: careybaptistchurch.org.uk

History
- Founded: 1867

Architecture
- Functional status: Active

Carey Baptist Church is an independent evangelical/Baptist church in Reading, England.

== History ==
The church was founded in 1867 and was named after William Carey, a famous missionary from Northamptonshire, who went to India in 1793, and never returned to his homeland.

Carey's first pastor was John Howard Hinton.

Notable past elders include Rev. Theodore Harold Bendor-Samuel.

In the mid-1970s two members of Carey, David and Madeleine Potter, founded a Christian Charity called Prospects to support learning disabled adults and help them reach their full potential. In 2016, Prospects became part of the Livability Group.

Additional premises, The Carey Centre, in Anstey Road (a parallel road behind the chapel) were acquired in 1993, following the closure of Central Evangelical Church.

As of June 2009, Carey Baptist Church now owns part of what was the Oasis Public House.

== Carey today ==
The church building is on Carey Street (Anstey Road) in central Reading, close to the Inner Distribution Road (IDR), Oxford Road, and The Hexagon.

The main service times are 10:30 and 18:00 on Sunday. MP3-format files of the sermons are available on the church's website and Sunday services are streamed live from the website. Sunday services can also be watched live on Facebook or YouTube.

The church is affiliated to Affinity and the FIEC Fellowship of Independent Evangelical Churches.

The current pastors are David Magowan., John Heron, Andy Kight and Rich Baxter. Jonathan Stephen left the church on 16 July 2006 to take up the position of principal of the Wales Evangelical School of Theology in September 2006, while Basil Howlett retired from the position of co-pastor in January 2009.

=== Missions ===
The church continues to work in the tradition of William Carey by sending missionaries abroad to India and the Amazon. In 2005 a missionary from Carey, David Barnes, was serving in Aysana, a small village, about five hours down river from Iquitos, Peru.

Ian Stillman, a deaf missionary sent to India by Carey Baptist, was arrested in August 2000 and charged with smuggling 20 kilograms of cannabis after the drug was found in a shared taxi. It is widely believed that the charges were fabricated. Parliament "pa(id) tribute" to Carey Baptist on the successful campaign to obtain Stillman's release from prison.
