= List of storms named Cary =

The name Cary has been used for three tropical cyclones in the western north Pacific Ocean.

- Tropical Storm Cary (1980) (T8022, 26W), while forming, it crossed the Philippines without impact
- Typhoon Cary (1984) (T8405, 05W), no impact on land
- Typhoon Cary (1987) (T8711, 10W, Ising), made landfall on Luzon, Philippines, and later in northern Vietnam
