= Carey, Georgia =

Unincorporated community in Georgia, U.S.

Coordinates: 33°32′51″N 83°16′09″W

Carey is an unincorporated community in Greene County, in the U.S. state of Georgia.

== History ==
A variant name was "Litch". A post office called Litch was established in 1909, and remained in operation until 1918. The current name is after James Carey, a railroad agent.
