= J. W. Carey House =

Historic house in Washington, United States

- J.W. Carey house
- U.S. National Register of Historic Places
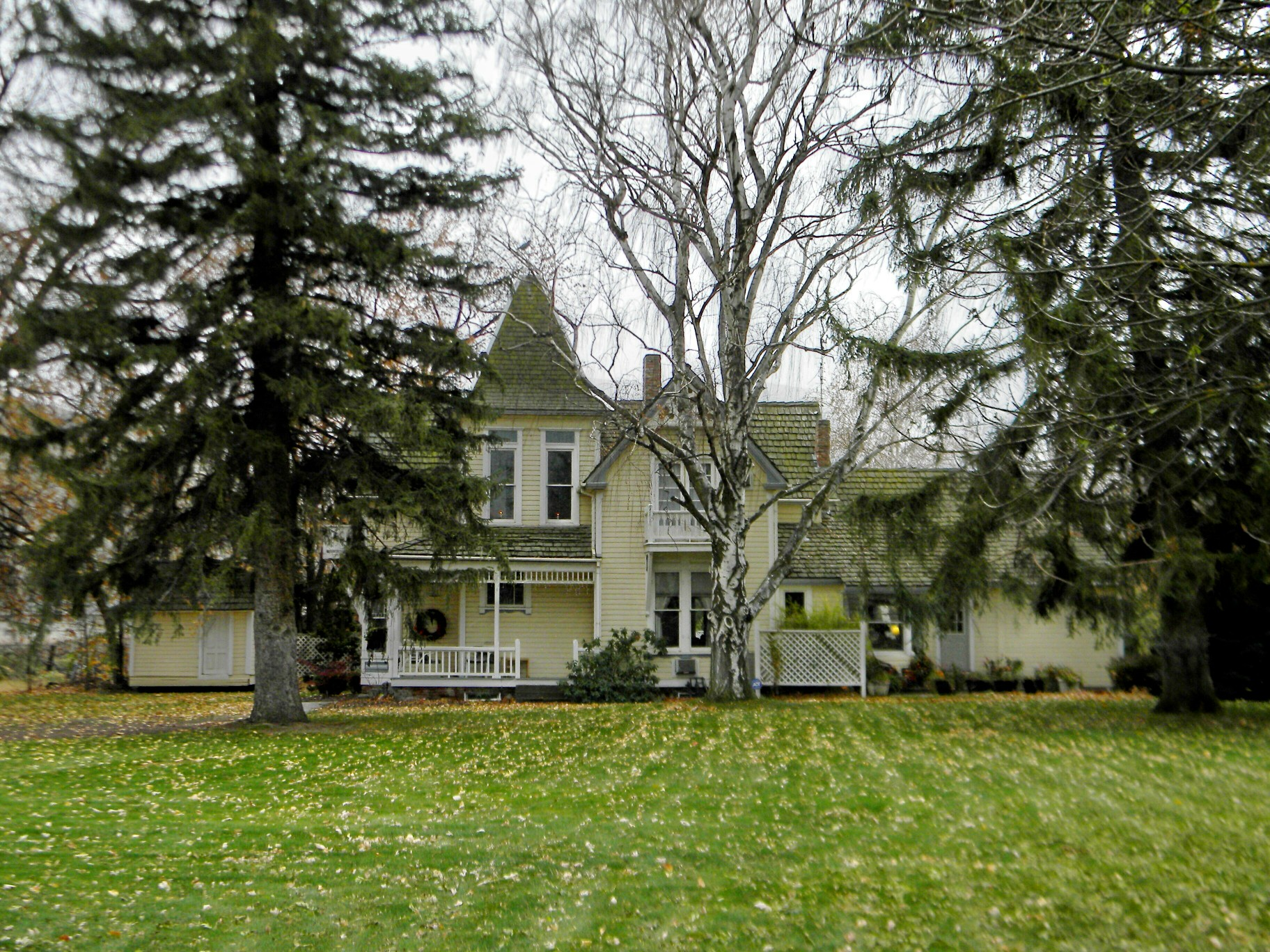
- J. W. Carey House, Prosser, WA

- Location within Washington (state) Location within the United States
- Location: Byron Road, west of Prosser
- Area: 1.35 acres (0.55 ha)
- Built: 1895
- Architectural style: Wood frame Queen Anne
- NRHP reference No.: 89002096
- Added to NRHP: 1989

The J. W. Carey House, a Queen Anne style house built in 1895, is located west of Prosser, Washington, United States.

The House was built in 1895 by J. W. Carey, (an agent of the Northern Pacific Railroad) on land originally subdivided by the Prosser Falls Irrigation Company for small orchards. The land reverted to PFIC the next year, and was sold at auction to future United States Senator Levi Ankeny, who held the house until 1903.

The house is one of the best examples of residential architecture from Prosser's initial boom. It has been listed on the National Register of Historic Places since 1989. The House is currently a private residence.
