= Prospects (charity) =

UK Christian charity

Prospects is a Christian charity in the United Kingdom whose aim is to support learning disabled adults, and to enable them to reach their full potential. It was founded in the mid-1970s by David Potter, a Christian minister, who was drawn to the needs of these adults because he and his wife had a daughter with Down syndrome.

The charity's method of operation is to seek a partnership with a local church before opening a residential facility; this dates back to the original residence, Plas Lluest, near Aberystwyth, which was purchased and established with the help of the Alfred Place Baptist Church in Aberystwyth, with the child of two members of that congregation as the first resident.

Based on the headline over the article Potter wrote and published in the Evangelical Times, Prospects was originally called A Cause for Concern. The name was changed in 1997, at the same time as a reorganisation from a charitable trust into a limited company with charitable status.

Prospects methodology has changed and it now works with around 40 local authorities who fund over 60 services supporting over 300 adults across the UK. The majority of these services are Supported living services with, in addition, a small number of Residential Homes and Day Opportunity services. All Prospects services are regulated by the appropriate bodies in England, Wales and Northern Ireland.

Prospects vision and mission has been to offer "Christianly distinctive" services to enable people with learning disabilities who so desire, to live a fully Christian life. This Christian ethos is delivered through the staff and in consequence many posts within the organisation carry a Genuine Occupational Requirement to be a Christian.

In addition Prospects has two projects; Causeway Prospects and International Prospects, which are funded separately and entirely from gift income. These projects work with Churches and Christian organisations in the UK and abroad to enable full inclusion in Church life and personal spiritual development for people with learning disabilities. International Prospects also partners in Christian social care initiatives in developing counties.
