= Cari Groce =

American tennis coach

Biographical details
- Born: Stillwater, Oklahoma

Coaching career (HC unless noted)
- 2003-2008: Texas Tech

Cari Groce is a former coach of Texas Tech's women's tennis team. Her time coaching the team ended before the 2008/09 season. Her record with the Lady Raiders stands at 58–44 with only a single winning season in the Big 12.

Groce played tennis at the University of Nebraska where she became the first All-American in school history in 1986.

Groce is the daughter of Ike Groce, who was inducted into the Texas Tennis Hall of Fame in 1982.
