= Carrie (digital library) =

Carrie is an online digital library project based at the University of Kansas containing full-text books and documents. The site became operational in 1993, and has the distinction of being among the first university-library hosted sites for full on-line texts. The site, named after the university's first professional librarian, evolved from an earlier collection of online resources. This evolution was spearheaded by Lynn Nelson, a professor of history, and put into effect by a team creating the Lynx text-based browser. In 1993, the site linked to over three thousand texts. It currently has extensive links to historical documents relating to Kansas history, as well as significant links to material in other areas.
