= Carri Leigh Goodwin =

United States Marine

- Born: January 5, 1989; Alliance, Ohio, United States
- Died: February 28, 2009 (aged 20); Alliance, Ohio, United States
- Military career
- Allegiance: United States
- Branch: United States Marine Corps
- Service years: 2007–2009

Carri Leigh Goodwin (January 5, 1989 – February 28, 2009) enlisted in the United States Marine Corps in 2007 at the age of 18. Goodwin from Alliance, Ohio and was the daughter of a Marine. She experienced rape during her service by a Marine who had been accused of another rape at Camp Pendleton in 2006. Goodwin reported the rape to her commander. Goodwin was "bullied by her command for reporting the rape." The accused Marine remained on duty but Goodwin was discharged with personality disorder.

When she returned, her father, Gary Noling, noticed that she was "drinking heavily." Five days after her return home, she was found dead due to excessive alcohol consumption. Noling found Goodwin's journals later, which contained information about her rape and "suicidal thoughts."

Her death raised awareness about misconduct in the United States armed forces and mental and physical trauma from acts of sexual assault. In 2011, a class-action suit was brought against the Department of Defense for failing to properly investigate accusations of sexual assault, failure to prosecute and for other causes. Kirby Dick created "The Invisible War" in 2012 in order to tell the stories of those affected by sexual assault. Goodwin is mentioned in the film.

== See also ==
- Sexual assault in the United States military
