= Jean de Carro =

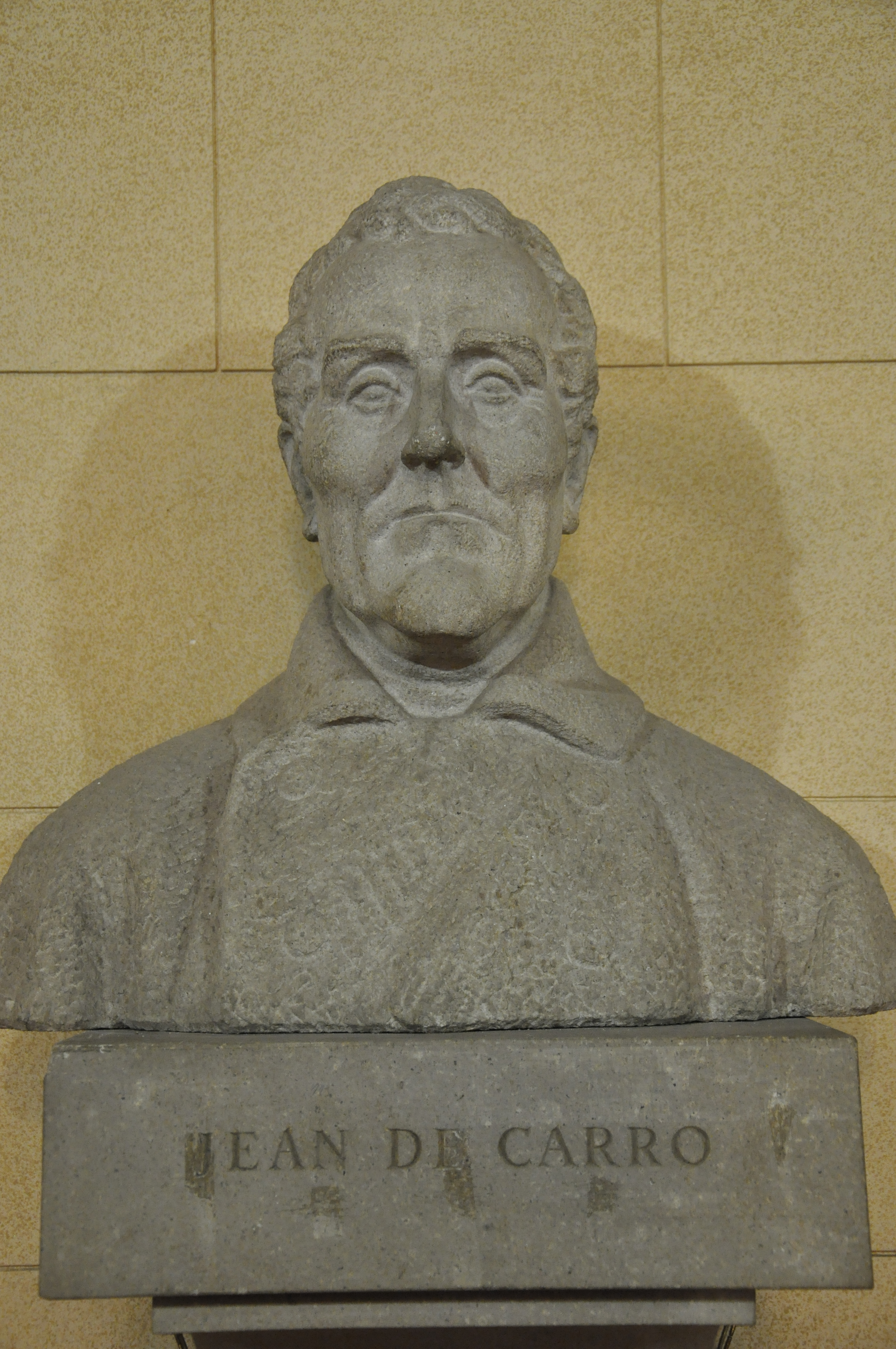
- Bust of Jean de Carro in the stairway of the old Kaiserbad at Carlsbad

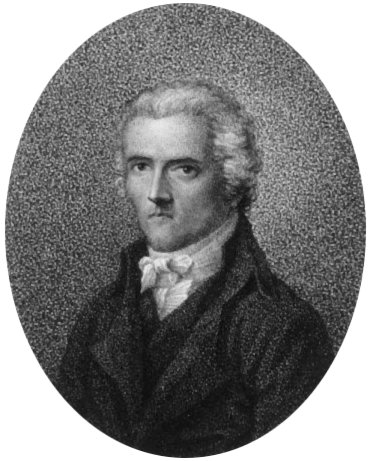
Engraving of Jean de Carro

Jean de Carro (born in Geneva, August 8, 1770; died at Carlsbad, March 12, 1857) was a Republic of Geneva-born medical doctor who worked from Austria to promote vaccination against smallpox.

== Champion of vaccination ==
Taking up his abode in Vienna in 1795, he became celebrated by his efforts in spreading Edward Jenner's system of vaccination as a protection against smallpox in Germany, Hungary, Poland, and Russia. In 1800 he sent a quantity of virus to Lord Elgin at Constantinople, together with a work of his own, translated into Turkish, on vaccination.

The attempts of the English to introduce vaccination into India having been unsuccessful, because the virus had deteriorated on the way, Carro procured vaccine matter from cows of Lombardy..., and sent it to Dr. Harford at Baghdad. This retained all its strength, and was the means of introducing kinepox inoculation into India. The Hindus considered it to be derived from a sacred cow.

== Works ==
- Observations et expériences sur l'inoculation de la vaccine (Vienna, 1801)
- Histoire de la vaccination en Turquie, en Grèce et aux Indes Orientales (1803)
- Carlsbad et ses eaux minérales (1827)
- Vingt-huit ans d'observation et d'expériences à Carlsbad (1853)

For many years he published annually the Almanach de Carlsbad.
