= Carey, Ohio =

Village in Wyandot County, Ohio, US

- Village
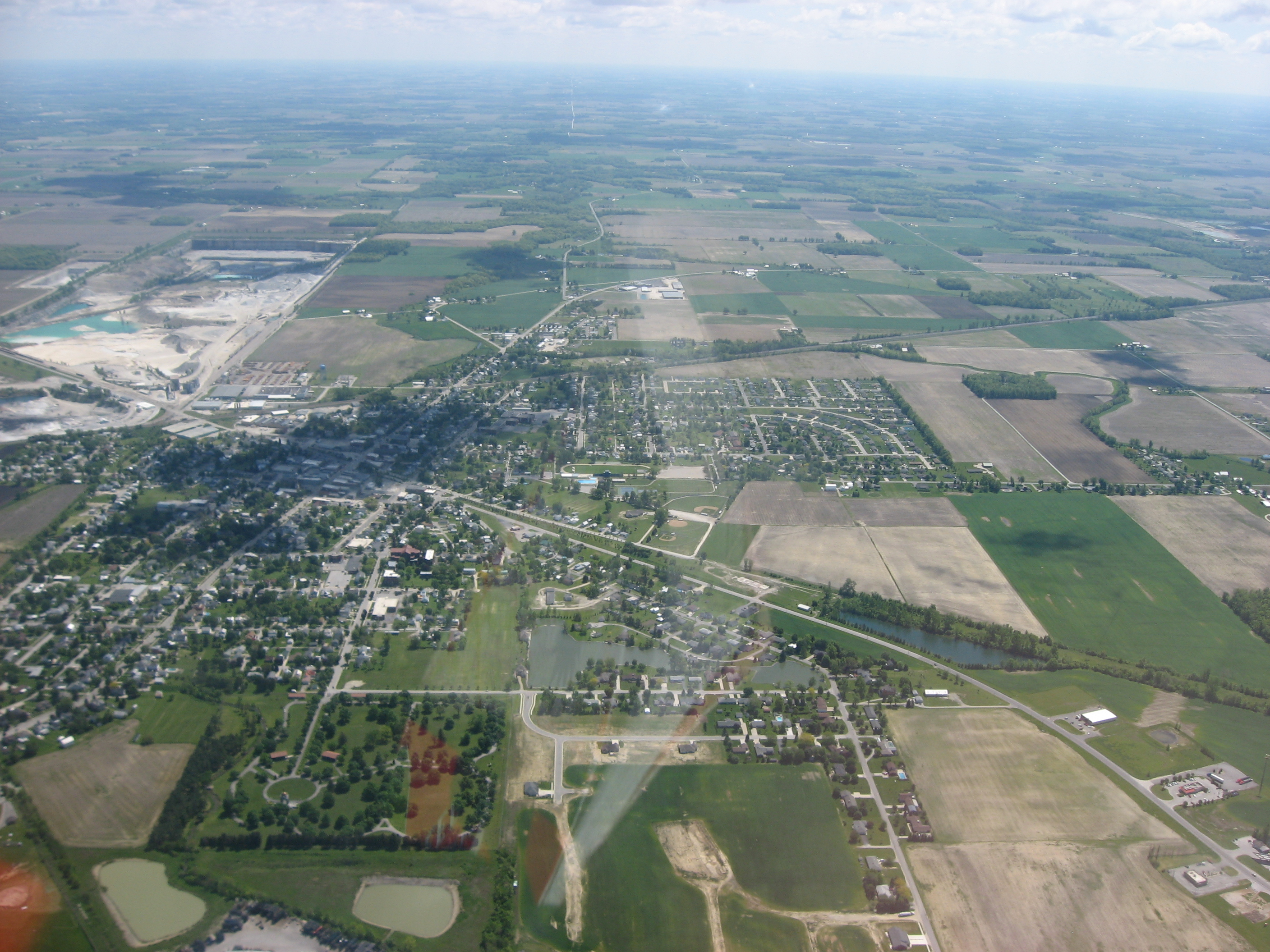
- Aerial view of Carey
- Motto: "Rock Solid Since 1858!"
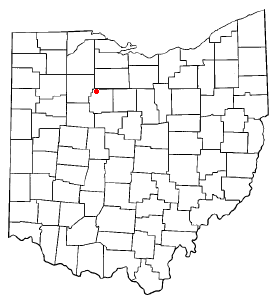
- Location of Carey, Ohio

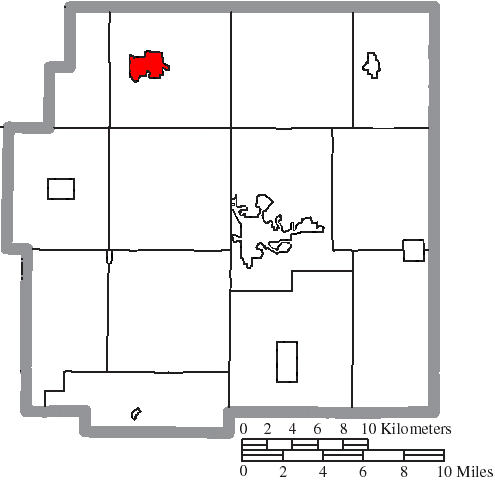
- Location of Carey in Wyandot County
- Coordinates: 40°56′58″N 83°22′34″W
- Country: United States
- State: Ohio
- County: Wyandot
- Township: Crawford

Area
  - Total: 2.17 sq mi (5.61 km^{2})
  - Land: 2.16 sq mi (5.59 km^{2})
  - Water: 0.0077 sq mi (0.02 km^{2})
- Elevation: 827 ft (252 m)

Population (2020)
  - Total: 3,565
  - Estimate (2023): 3,491
  - Density: 1,651.2/sq mi (637.52/km^{2})
- Time zone: UTC-5 (Eastern (EST))
  - Summer (DST): UTC-4 (EDT)
- ZIP code: 43316
- Area code: 419
- FIPS code: 39-12112
- GNIS feature ID: 2397553
- Website: Village of Carey, Ohio

Carey is a village in Wyandot County, Ohio, United States. The population was 3,565 at the 2020 census.

== History ==
The village is near Sheriden Cave, where habitation occurred around 11,000BC. The village of Carey was founded in 1843 when W. J. Buell and R. M. Shuler laid out the town on land that they owned. The town was named after Judge John Carey, an early prominent resident.

Carey is home to an early settlement of Luxembourgers that continues to uphold its Luxembourg heritage today. Each year, an annual pilgrimage honoring Our Lady, Consoler of the Afflicted, is attended by crowds of people. The event features a religious procession starting in the neighboring community of Frenchtown and ending in Carey, seven miles away. The procession symbolizes the long journey of Luxembourg immigrants and their search for new life in the United States.

== Geography ==
According to the United States Census Bureau, the village has a total area of 1.99 square miles (5.15 km^{2}), of which 1.98 square miles (5.13 km^{2}) is land and 0.01 square miles (0.03 km^{2}) is water.

== Demographics ==
Historical population
Census	Pop.	Note	%±
1870	692		—
1880	1,148		65.9%
1890	1,605		39.8%
1900	1,816		13.1%
1910	2,225		22.5%
1920	2,488		11.8%
1930	2,722		9.4%
1940	2,984		9.6%
1950	3,260		9.2%
1960	3,722		14.2%
1970	3,523		−5.3%
1980	3,674		4.3%
1990	3,684		0.3%
2000	3,901		5.9%
2010	3,674		−5.8%
2020	3,565		−3.0%
2023 (est.)	3,491	▼	−2.1%
U.S. Decennial Census

=== 2020 census ===
As of the 2020 census, Carey had a population of 3,565. The median age was 40.8 years. 23.6% of residents were under the age of 18 and 16.9% of residents were 65 years of age or older. For every 100 females there were 96.2 males, and for every 100 females age 18 and over there were 96.5 males age 18 and over.

0.0% of residents lived in urban areas, while 100.0% lived in rural areas.

There were 1,512 households in Carey, of which 29.7% had children under the age of 18 living in them. Of all households, 43.5% were married-couple households, 20.1% were households with a male householder and no spouse or partner present, and 28.0% were households with a female householder and no spouse or partner present. About 31.6% of all households were made up of individuals and 12.8% had someone living alone who was 65 years of age or older.

There were 1,660 housing units, of which 8.9% were vacant. The homeowner vacancy rate was 0.7% and the rental vacancy rate was 16.2%.

Racial composition as of the 2020 census
Race	Number	Percent
White	3,345	93.8%
Black or African American	15	0.4%
American Indian and Alaska Native	5	0.1%
Asian	37	1.0%
Native Hawaiian and Other Pacific Islander	0	0.0%
Some other race	18	0.5%
Two or more races	145	4.1%
Hispanic or Latino (of any race)	72	2.0%

=== 2010 census ===
As of the census of 2010, there were 3,674 people, 1,521 households, and 983 families living in the village. The population density was 1,855.6 inhabitants per square mile (716.5/km^{2}). There were 1,646 housing units at an average density of 831.3 per square mile (321.0/km^{2}). The racial makeup of the village was 96.2% White, 0.2% African American, 0.2% Native American, 1.6% Asian, 0.7% from other races, and 1.0% from two or more races. Hispanic or Latino of any race were 2.0% of the population.

There were 1,521 households, of which 34.7% had children under the age of 18 living with them, 44.8% were married couples living together, 13.8% had a female householder with no husband present, 6.0% had a male householder with no wife present, and 35.4% were non-families. 31.1% of all households were made up of individuals, and 11.9% had someone living alone who was 65 years of age or older. The average household size was 2.41 and the average family size was 2.99.

The median age in the village was 37.1 years. 26.4% of residents were under the age of 18; 8.2% were between the ages of 18 and 24; 25.4% were from 25 to 44; 27% were from 45 to 64; and 13% were 65 years of age or older. The gender makeup of the village was 49.3% male and 50.7% female.

=== 2000 census ===
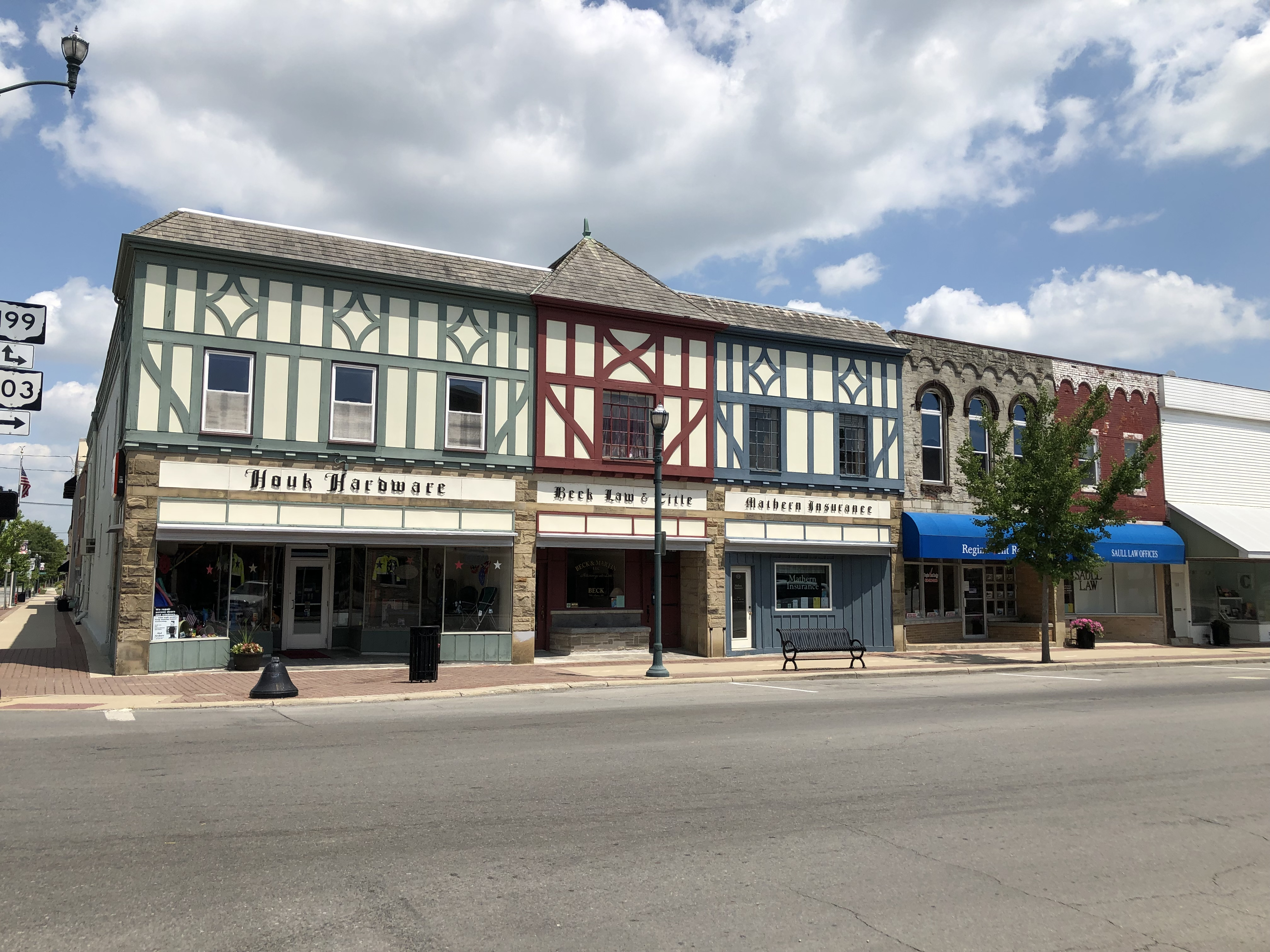
Downtown Carey at the intersection of Findlay Street and Vance Street.

As of the census of 2000, there were 3,901 people, 1,543 households, and 1,023 families living in the village. The population density was 1,977.6 inhabitants per square mile (763.6/km^{2}). There were 1,607 housing units at an average density of 814.6 per square mile (314.5/km^{2}). The racial makeup of the village was 96.41% White, 0.15% African American, 0.10% Native American, 1.74% Asian, 0.85% from other races, and 0.74% from two or more races. Hispanic or Latino of any race were 1.38% of the population.

There were 1,543 households, out of which 33.2% had children under the age of 18 living with them, 47.6% were married couples living together, 13.2% had a female householder with no husband present, and 33.7% were non-families. 29.9% of all households were made up of individuals, and 12.3% had someone living alone who was 65 years of age or older. The average household size was 2.49 and the average family size was 3.07.

In the village, the population was spread out, with 26.9% under the age of 18, 9.9% from 18 to 24, 28.6% from 25 to 44, 20.2% from 45 to 64, and 14.4% who were 65 years of age or older. The median age was 34 years. For every 100 females there were 93.3 males. For every 100 females age 18 and over, there were 90.6 males.

The median income for a household in the village was $33,116, and the median income for a family was $40,921. Males had a median income of $30,938 versus $22,123 for females. The per capita income for the village was $15,309. About 4.6% of families and 8.6% of the population were below the poverty line, including 8.5% of those under age 18 and 9.2% of those age 65 or over.

== Government ==
Carey is served by a mayor and a six-member village council. The mayor and council members are elected for four-year terms, with elections every two years. Two council members are elected in the same cycle as the mayor; the remaining four council members are elected in alternate election years. Carey's recent mayor, Jennifer Rathburn, is a lifelong resident of the village who was elected in 2017 after previous stints as interim mayor and council president. She resigned from office in 2024.

== Education ==
Carey Public Schools are part of the Carey Exempted Village School District. There is one elementary school, one high school, and one Catholic School (Our Lady of Consolation) in the district. Students attend Carey High School.

Carey has a lending library, the Dorcas Carey Public Library.

== Notable people ==
- John Carey, US Congressman
- Don Wedge, NFL and Collegiate Official
