= Marko Car =

Marko Car may refer to:

- Marko Car (writer), Serbian writer from the Bay of Kotor
- Marko Car (basketball), Croatian basketball player
