= Justice Carey =

Justice Carey may refer to:

- James B. Carey (judge) (1905–1979), associate justice of the Delaware Supreme Court
- Joseph M. Carey (1845–1924), associate justice of the Supreme Court of the Territory of Wyoming
