= Carey Lake =

Lake in the state of Minnesota, United States

- Location within Minnesota
- Location: Cottonwood County, Minnesota
- Coordinates: 43°57′50″N 95°21′19″W
- Type: lake

Carey Lake is a lake in Cottonwood County, in the U.S. state of Minnesota.

Carey Lake was named for three brothers who settled there: Harvey, John, and Ralph Carey.
