= Cary Audio Design =

- Type: Private
- Industry: High End Audio Equipment
- Founded: 1989; 37 years ago
- Headquarters: Apex, North Carolina
- Key people: Billy Wright (CEO); Daryl Berk
- Products: Audio, Home Theater
- Website: Cary Audio

Cary Audio Design is a company founded in May 1989 which originally designed and manufactured vacuum tube audio amplifiers. Since the mid-1990s they have expanded into the home theater market, producing DVD players and surround sound processors in addition to their original vacuum tube designs.

The company is notable as one of the few U.S. manufacturers of vacuum tube amplifiers. Many of their high-end "Classic Series" designs have received favorable reviews in audiophile publications, including The Absolute Sound, Stereophile and Soundstage!. Their CAD280 SE V12 stereo amplifier received a CES 2001 "Best of Show" designation from reviewer Jim Saxon.

Originally based in (and named after) Cary, North Carolina, Cary Audio Design's facilities are now located in the nearby town of Apex.

== Amateur Radio Connection ==
Dennis "Denny" Had was also the founder of the Dentron Radio Company, Ameritron amplifiers, and Amp Supply Company. Dentron Radio Manufactured all sorts of Amateur Radio gear; Amplifiers, Tuners, and for a very short time High Frequency Transceivers. Amp Supply Company and Dentron are no longer in business. Ameritron is now owned by MFJ Enterprises. Dentron, Ameritron and Amp Supply Company were all based originally in Ohio. Amp Supply moved to Cary, North Carolina and soon morphed into the Cary Audio Company. Amp Supply was eventually closed. Amp Supply, Dentron and Ameritron Amps can all be found on eBay to this very day. Amp Supply Products are not commonly found on eBay, but Dentron and Ameritron are very common. Dennis Had is no longer associated with Cary Audio Design.
