= Carry =

Carry or carrying may refer to:

== People ==
- Carry (name)

== Finance ==
- Carried interest (or carry), the share of profits in an investment fund paid to the fund manager
- Carry (investment), a financial term: the carry of an asset is the gain or cost of holding the asset

== Firearms ==
- Concealed carry, carrying a firearm or other weapon in public in a concealed manner
- Open carry, openly carrying a firearm in public
- Right to keep and bear arms, a right for citizens to possess and carry firearms

== Sports & gaming ==
- Carry, a fault in the game of pickleball
- Carry (American football), a statistical term equivalent to a single rushing play
- Carry (eSports), a type of role in multiplayer online battle arena games
- Carrying (basketball), a rule breach in basketball

== Other ==
- Carry (arithmetic), when a digit is larger than a limit and the extra is moved to the left
  - Carry flag, the equivalent in calculation in a computer
- "Carry" (song), a song by Tori Amos
- Suzuki Carry, a light commercial vehicle
- Carry (work), mode of transport of goods

== See also ==
- Carey (disambiguation)
- Carrie (disambiguation)
- Cary (disambiguation)
- Carny (disambiguation)
- Carra (disambiguation)
