= Pierre Cary =

French politician

Pierre Cary was a politician, born in Boulogne-Sur-Mer in the Pas-de-Calais in 1793. Coming from a local family of note, he was a landowner in the department, and served as a deputy of the Pas-de-Calais, initially aligning himself at first with the moderate republicans and later with the leftists. He died in 1857 in the Arrondissement of Béthune.
