= John Cary (valet) =

African-American servant of George Washington

John Cary (August 1729 (unattested date) - 2 June 1843) was the African-American enslaved body servant of American Revolutionary War General George Washington.

Cary said that he was born in Westmoreland County, Virginia, in August 1729; he died in Washington, D.C., 2 June 1843. He was with Washington in the old French war at Braddock's defeat, and accompanied him through the revolutionary struggle. In 1843, he petitioned for a Revolutionary Pension.
