= Cary, Wisconsin =

Town of Cary, Wisconsin
- Town
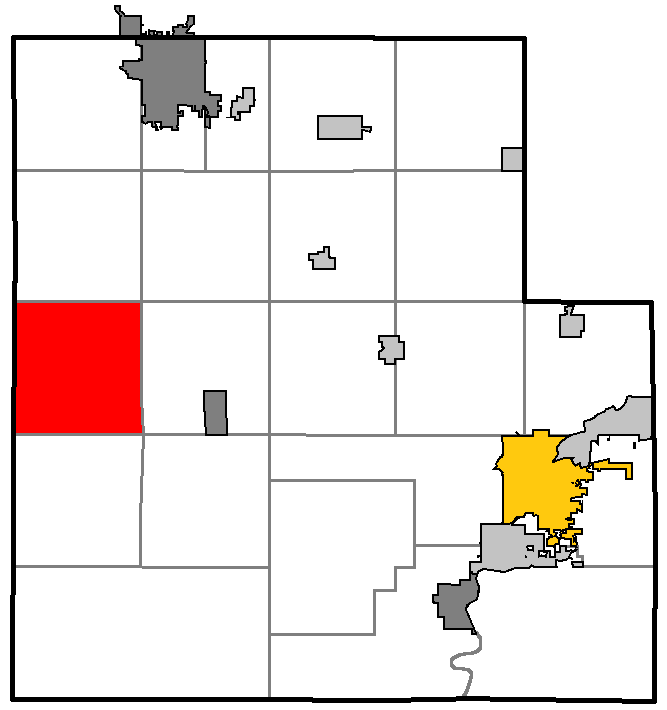
- Location of the Town of Cary, Wood County

- Location of Wood County, Wisconsin
- Coordinates: 44°28′18″N 90°16′15″W
- Country: United States
- State: Wisconsin
- County: Wood

Area
  - Total: 35.1 sq mi (91.0 km^{2})
  - Land: 35.0 sq mi (90.7 km^{2})
  - Water: 0.12 sq mi (0.3 km^{2})
- Elevation: 1,040 ft (317 m)

Population (2020)
  - Total: 406
  - Density: 11.6/sq mi (4.48/km^{2})
- Time zone: UTC-6 (Central (CST))
  - Summer (DST): UTC-5 (CDT)
- Area codes: 715 & 534
- FIPS code: 55-12775
- GNIS feature ID: 1582919
- PLSS township: T23N R2E
- Website: https://townofcarywis.com/

The Town of Cary is located in Wood County, Wisconsin, United States. The population was 406 at the time of the 2020 census.

== Geography ==
According to the United States Census Bureau, the town has a total area of 35.2 square miles (91.0 km^{2}), of which 35.0 square miles (90.7 km^{2}) is land and 0.1 square mile (0.3 km^{2}) (0.34%) is water.

== History ==
In the summer of 1851 a crew working for the U.S. government surveyed the outline of the six mile square that would become Cary. That December another crew marked all the section corners, walking through the woods and wading the swamps, measuring with chain and compass. When done, the deputy surveyor filed this general description:

The surface of this Township is generally level. Except in the Northern Part which is somewhat Rolling. There is considerable sandstone in the Northern Part. the soil is generally 2d rate Although in the North Eastern Part there is some good farming Land; the timber is mostly sugar Oak Linn Tamarack & Pine. Alders in the swamps the streams are fed by the swamps and are not durable during times of drowth.

The town of Cary was split off from the town of Wood in 1901 and named after "Cary", a now-extinct railroad depot within its borders.

== Demographics ==
As of the census of 2000, there were 398 people, 162 households, and 121 families residing in the town. The population density was 11.4 people per square mile (4.4/km^{2}). There were 228 housing units at an average density of 6.5 per square mile (2.5/km^{2}). The racial makeup of the town was 96.98% White, 2.26% Asian, 0.25% from other races, and 0.50% from two or more races. Hispanic or Latino of any race were 0.25% of the population.

There were 162 households, out of which 32.7% had children under the age of 18 living with them, 63.0% were married couples living together, 7.4% had a female householder with no husband present, and 25.3% were non-families. 21.0% of all households were made up of individuals, and 6.8% had someone living alone who was 65 years of age or older. The average household size was 2.46 and the average family size was 2.83.

In the town, the population was spread out, with 23.6% under the age of 18, 5.3% from 18 to 24, 25.6% from 25 to 44, 28.1% from 45 to 64, and 17.3% who were 65 years of age or older. The median age was 42 years. For every 100 females, there were 103.1 males. For every 100 females age 18 and over, there were 105.4 males.

The median income for a household in the town was $38,125, and the median income for a family was $44,107. Males had a median income of $33,750 versus $25,179 for females. The per capita income for the town was $18,043. About 4.9% of families and 2.5% of the population were below the poverty line, including 1.0% of those under age 18 and none of those age 65 or over.
