= Solomon Joseph Carpi =

Italian Jewish writer

Solomon Joseph ben Nathan Carpi (Hebrew: שלמה יוסף בן נתן קרפי, romanized: Shelomoh Yosef ben Natan Ḳarpi; born December 27, 1715) was an Italian Jewish writer.

He engaged in the controversy with regard to Gedaliah Ḥayyon's book on Shabbethai Zevi, writing an attack on it, extracts from which were published by N. Brüll under the title Toledot Shabbethai Zevi (Vilna, 1879). He also wrote a Hebrew elegy on the death of Emmanuel Ricchi, and corresponded with Joseph Ergas.
