= McCarry =

McCarry is a surname. Notable people with the surname include:

- Aidan McCarry (born 1963), Irish hurler
- Caleb McCarry, the Bush administration's Cuba Transition Coordinator
- Charles McCarry (born 1930), American writer
- Jane McCarry (born 1970), Scottish actress
- Patrick McCarry (1875 – 1921), Irish republican activist
- Sean McCarry (born 1957)

Founder and regional commander of the Community Rescue Service (CRS) in Northern Ireland.
