= List of storms named Carrie =

The name Carrie has been used for two tropical cyclones in the Atlantic Ocean.

- Hurricane Carrie (1957) – a long-lived Cape Verde-type system that peaked as a Category 4 major hurricane.
- Tropical Storm Carrie (1972) – affected the Northeastern United States and the Maritime provinces of Canada.
