= Carro Quemado =

Coordinates: 36°28′S 65°20′W

- Rural locality and village
- Interactive map of Carro Quemado
- Country: Argentina
- Province: La Pampa Province
- Time zone: UTC−3 (ART)

Carro Quemado is a village and rural locality (municipality) in La Pampa Province in Argentina.
