= Gaetano Cari =

Italian scientific instrument maker

Gaetano Cari (18th century) was an Italian scientific instrument maker.

Not much is known about Gaetano Cari, except that he performed restoration work on physics instruments at the Pistoia Seminary in 1787 and was appointed steward of the Museo di Fisica e Storia Naturale in Florence in 1788. Because of his poor health, he was relieved of the latter duties in the following year.

== Bibliography ==
- Museo Galileo. "Gaetano Cari". Catalogue of the Museo Galileo's Instruments on Display. catalogue.museogalileo.it
