= Carey Baptist Church, Preston =

Coordinates: 53.7607°N 2.6940°W

Carey Baptist Church
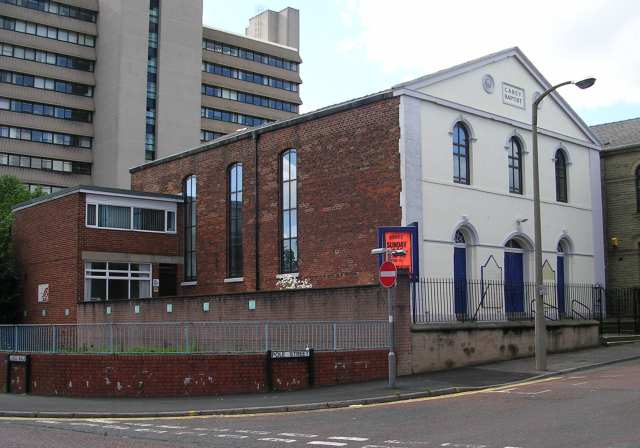
- Carey Baptist Church

- Location in Preston
- OS grid reference: SD 543 296
- Location: Pole Street, Preston, Lancashire
- Country: England
- Denomination: Baptist
- Website: Carey Baptist Church

History
- Founded: 1826

Architecture
- Functional status: Active
- Heritage designation: Grade II
- Designated: 20 December 1991

Specifications
- Materials: Brick, slate roof

Carey Baptist Church, is a Baptist church in Preston, Lancashire, England. It is recorded in the National Heritage List for England as a designated Grade II listed building. It is affiliated with the Baptist Union of Great Britain.

== History ==
The church was built in 1826 for the Countess of Huntingdon's Connexion. The building has since been altered and used as a Baptist church.

== Architecture ==
=== Exterior ===
Carey Baptist Church is built in brick. with a stuccoed entrance front and a slate roof. It has a rectangular plan, it is in two storeys, and there is a small lean-to extension at the back. The entrance front faces the road, it is symmetrical, and is in three bays. There are pilasters at the corners, and at the top is a gable acting as a pediment. In the ground floor are three doorways, the central doorway being wider than the outer doorways, all with fanlights under moulded surrounds containing keystones. The central doorway has a segmental head and contains double doors, the outer doorways being round-headed. In the upper storey are three round-headed windows with moulded surrounds and keystones. The pediment contains a panel flanked by roundels. The panel is inscribed with "CAREY BAPTIST". Along the sides of the church are tall segmental-headed windows.

=== Interior ===
Inside the church there was originally a horseshoe gallery, but this has been reduced in size to a curved gallery. This has a panelled front and is carried in slim cast iron columns. Around the church is a dentilled cornice, the ceiling is panelled, and the windows have moulded surrounds. At the west end is a plastered Corinthian architraved opening with a modillion cornice and an inscribed frieze.

== See also ==
- Listed buildings in Preston, Lancashire
