= Carey, Texas =

- Unincorporated community
- Location of Carey in Texas Carey (the United States)
- Coordinates: 34°28′16″N 100°19′32″W
- Country: United States
- State: Texas
- County: Childress
- Elevation: 1,890 ft (580 m)

Population (2000)
  - Total: 60
- Time zone: UTC-6 (Central (CST))
  - Summer (DST): UTC-5 (CDT)
- ZIP code: 79201
- Area code: 940
- FIPS code: 48075
- GNIS feature ID: 1353815

Carey is an unincorporated community in Childress County, Texas, United States. According to the Handbook of Texas, the community had a population of 60 in 2000.

== History ==
Carey was originally named Talulah after Talulah Collier. The post office in the community was established in 1896. Two years later, the Fort Worth and Denver City Railway renamed the town for railroad foreman Dan Carey, who received a land grant for the community. There was a cotton gin, a general store, and three churches alongside the post office in 1940. Carey comprised 25 families that year. The population was 57 with the post office and a store in 1980. The population went up to 60 from 1990 through 2000.

On March 23, 1973, an F1 tornado struck Carey. It caused at least $500 in damages.

== Geography ==
Carey is located on U.S. Route 287, 8 mi (13 km) northwest of Childress in Childress County. It is also on Texas State Highway Loop 328.

== Education ==
In 1888, Talulah Collier was the first schoolteacher in the community. The school was still standing in 1940 until it joined the Childress Independent School District in the 1960s.
