= Refuge du Carro =

Highest refuge of Savoy

Coordinates: 45°25′11″N 7°07′02″E

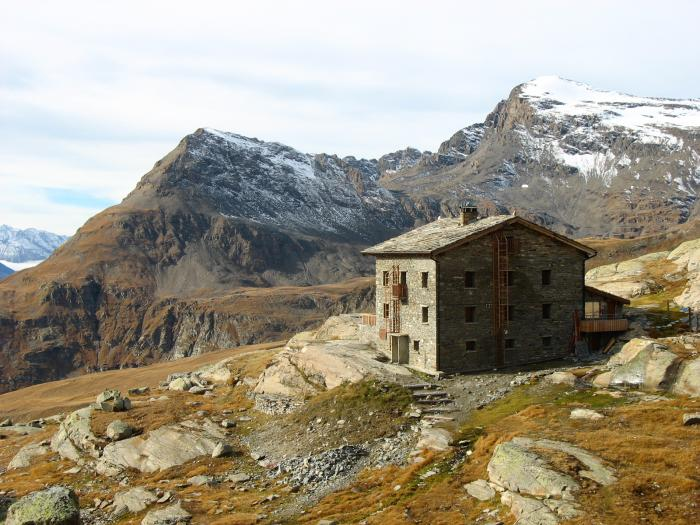
Refuge du Carro

Refuge du Carro is a refuge in the department of Savoie in the region Rhône-Alpes, France. At an altitude of 2,760 m, this is the highest refuge of Savoy.

== Col du Carro ==
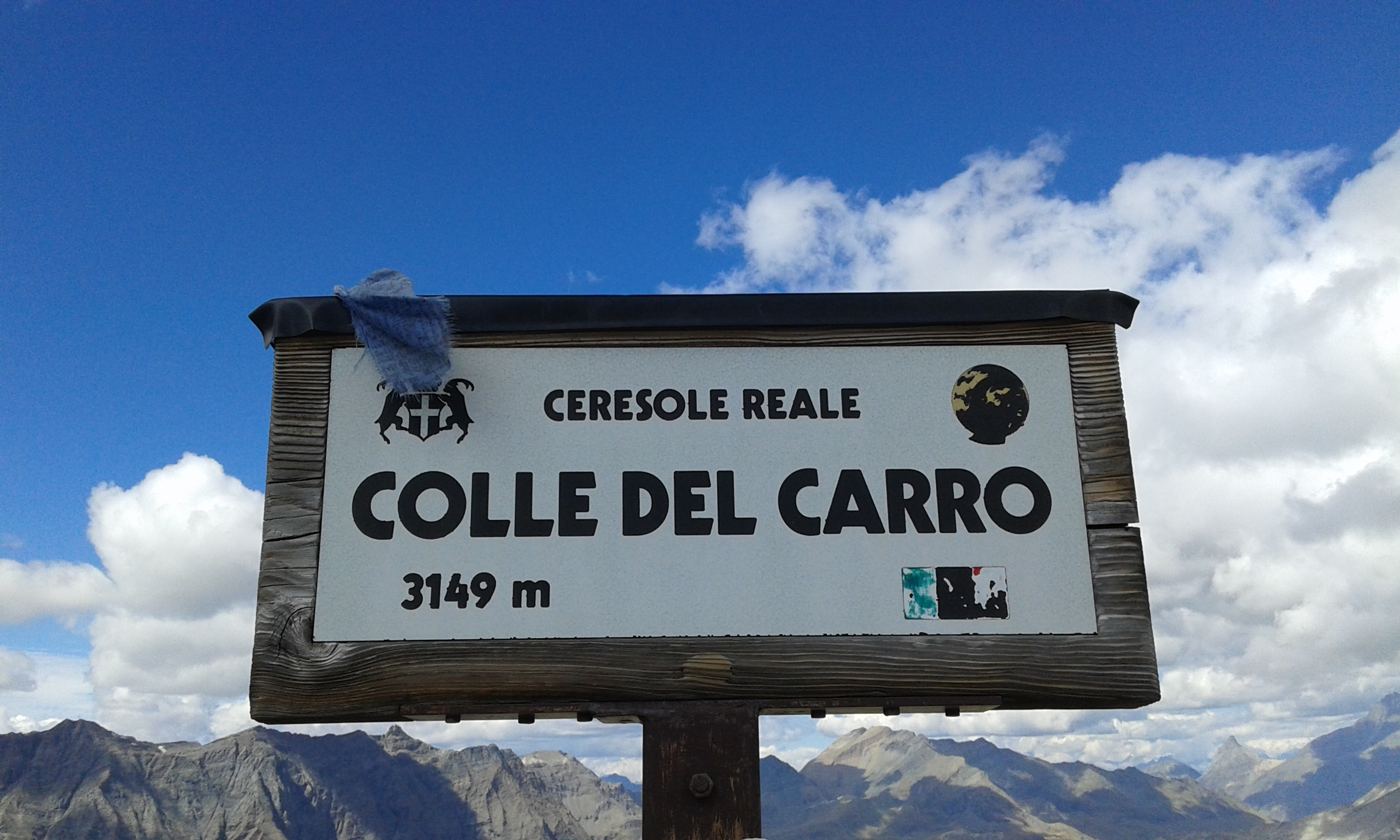
Panel in Italian at the Carro pass (3,149 m)

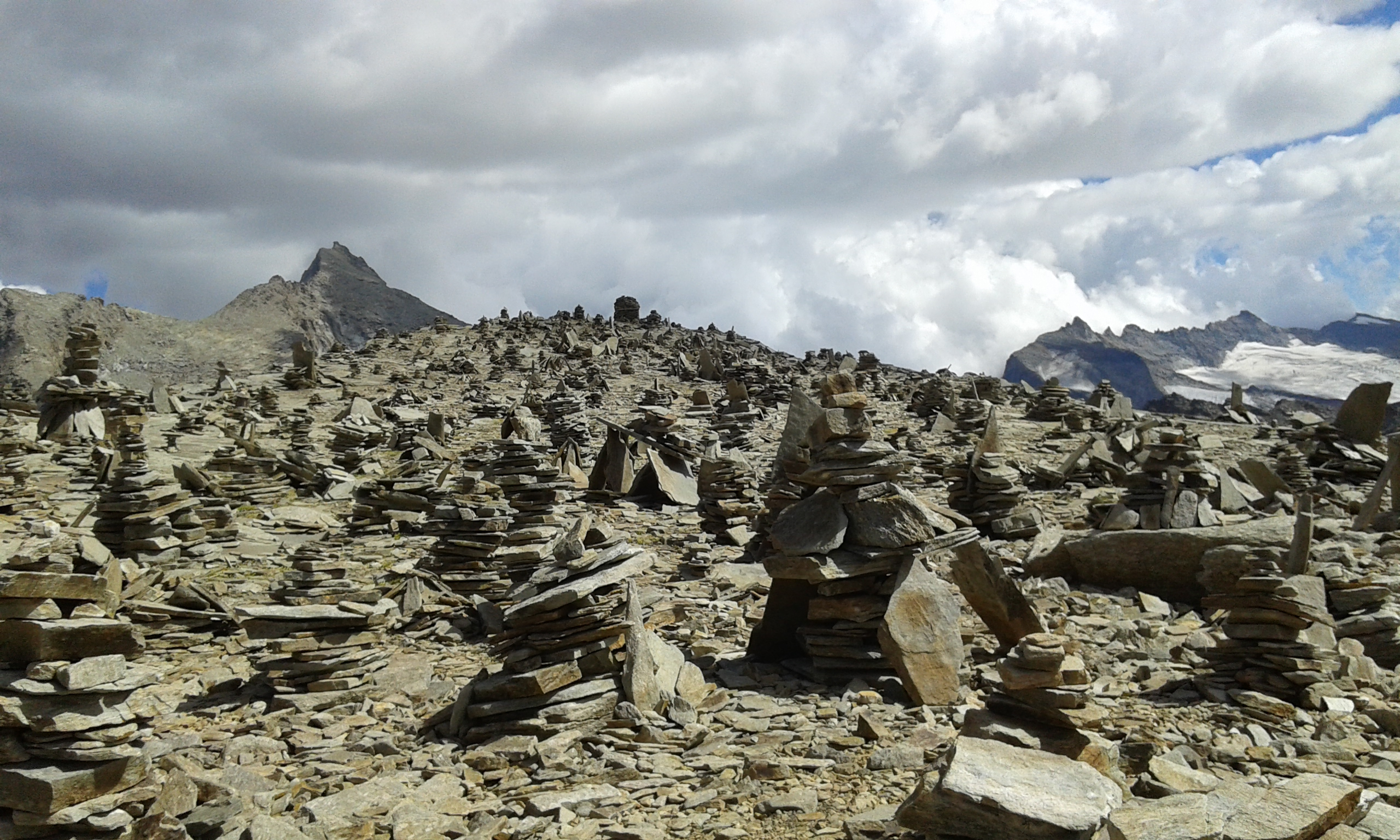
Cairns forest at the Carro pass

The Col du Carro (altitude: 3,149 m) allows the passage between Italy and France. Coming from Italy, the long-distance hiking trail (marked GR for "Grande Randonnée") crosses scree then becomes quite steep as you approach the Col du Carro. At the end of the final ascent of the via ferrata (Italian side), the hiker suddenly comes to a "forest of cairns" erected over the years and in perpetual growth.
