= Cari Batson Thomas =

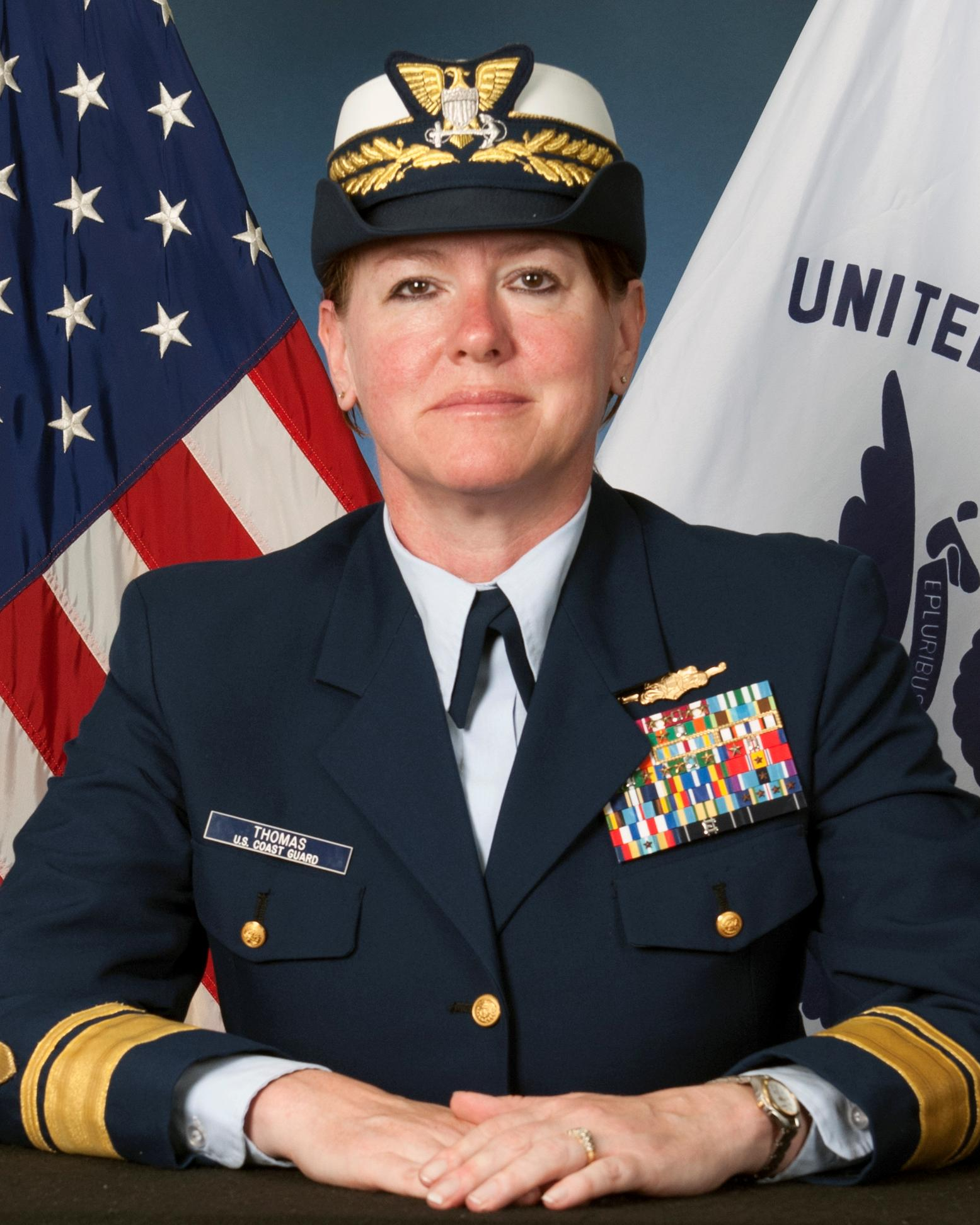
- Rear Admiral Cari B. Thomas
- Spouse(s): CDR Gary Thomas, USCG (Retired)
- Relatives: Andi Thomas, Daughter
- Military career
- Allegiance: United States
- Branch: United States Coast Guard
- Service years: 1984–2016
- Rank: Rear Admiral
- Commands: Coast Guard District Fourteen; Training Center Cape May; CGC Manitou
- Awards: Legion of Merit (2); Meritorious Service Medal (5); Joint Service Commendation Medal; Coast Guard Commendation Medal (4); Coast Guard Achievement Medal (2); State Dept Superior Honor Award

Cari Batson Thomas is a retired rear admiral of the United States Coast Guard and a 1984 graduate of the U. S. Coast Guard Academy. On January 22, 2010, Thomas became the third female commander of USCG Training Center Cape May to be advanced to a flag officer. Her final assignment was Assistant Commandant for Human Resources at the Coast Guard Academy.

Since retirement, she has been executive director of the Navy League, on the board of Navy Mutual Aid Association and on the Defense Advisory Committee on Women in the Military Services. She is the CEO of the Coast Guard Mutual Assistance Association and as an IMO Maritime Ambassador.

== Coast Guard career ==
Cari Thomas served aboard cutters Vigorous, Valiant, and commanded Manitou. Additionally, other operational assignments included Group-Air Station Atlantic City and as plankowner and Commander, Sector Miami, Response Operations. Some of her responsibilities included transitions to the RB-S, 47' MLB, 49' BUSL, and 87' CPB as well as numerous USCG, joint DOD, and interagency operations in the Northwest Atlantic, Gulf of Mexico, Caribbean, Bahamas, Straits of Florida, New Jersey coast and Delaware Bay. Thomas also served in the Enlisted Personnel Division of the Personnel Command, Admissions at the Coast Guard Academy, as a Program Reviewer at Headquarters and as the Executive Assistant to the Atlantic Area, Fifth District and Maritime Defense Zone Atlantic Commanders. She was able to gain experience in leading new Department of Homeland Security response regimes, she served two years as the Chief of Staff to Principal Federal Official (PFO), Northeast Region and as the predesignated Deputy PFO, Florida (collateral duty), Atlantic Area Resource Director, and as commander, Training Center Cape May.

As a flag officer, she served as Assistant Commandant, Response Policy (CG-5R), Commander, Coast Guard District Fourteen, and Assistant Commandant, Human Resources (CG-1). She represented the United States in a number of international forums, including formulating or updating international agreements in the Arctic and Central/South America, and throughout the Central and Western Pacific.

Thomas graduated with distinction from the Naval War College with a Master of Arts in National Security and Strategic Studies. She also holds a Master of Science in Educational Leadership from Troy State University and a Bachelor of Science in Civil Engineering from the Coast Guard Academy. She served on the board of directors for the Academy Alumni Association, and participated in various Coast Guard studies, including Project Kimball, Academy Task Force and as co-lead for the Force Readiness Command design team. Admiral Thomas received certificates at Harvard's National Preparedness Leadership Initiative and at Georgetown University. Her awards include the DHS Distinguished Service Medal, two Legions of Merit, five Meritorious Service Medals, the State Department Superior Honor Award, the Secretary of Defense Exceptional Public Service Award, and the Sea Services Leadership Association North Star award, among many other personal, unit and campaign awards. In 2024, Admiral Thomas was awarded the Distinguished Public Service Award, for her work with Coast Guard Mutual Assistance, the highest civilian award that the Commandant can award (aside the Gold and Silver Lifesaving medals). She earned permanent cutterman status in 1994.

== Non-profit career ==
After retirement from the Coast Guard, Admiral Thomas became the first woman national executive director of the Navy League of the United States. In this capacity, she was responsible for the oversight and management of the national staff, and supporting the more than 45,000 volunteers and 220 councils that assist the sea services and their families. Thomas also was the associate publisher for SeaPower magazine, and the chief executive officer of the Navy League Building LLC. The Navy League is responsible for educating the public about the need for the sea services and advocating for them with members of Congress. In this role, she helped coordinate investing in tomorrow's leaders through the Navy League's Naval Sea Cadet Corps program with nearly 10,000 cadets in 46 states and territories. She served the Navy League in this role in 2016-2017. She was also one of the primary authors of the Maritime Policy Statement for the Navy League.

Admiral Thomas transitioned to lead a military aid society for the Coast Guard, Coast Guard Mutual Assistance. The organization, formed in 1924 as the League of Coast Guard Women, has a long history as a military aid society whose motto is “We Look After Our Own.” With assets in excess of $50 million, Coast Guard Mutual Assistance (CGMA) has provided more than $230 million in assistance throughout its history. In 2021, CGMA received the prestigious Distinguished Public Service Award from the Coast Guard for its unprecedented leadership support during the COVID-19 pandemic and DHS Lapse in Appropriations. In 2021, Cari earned the prestigious Certified Association Executive (CAE) credential from the American Society of Association Executives.

== Family ==
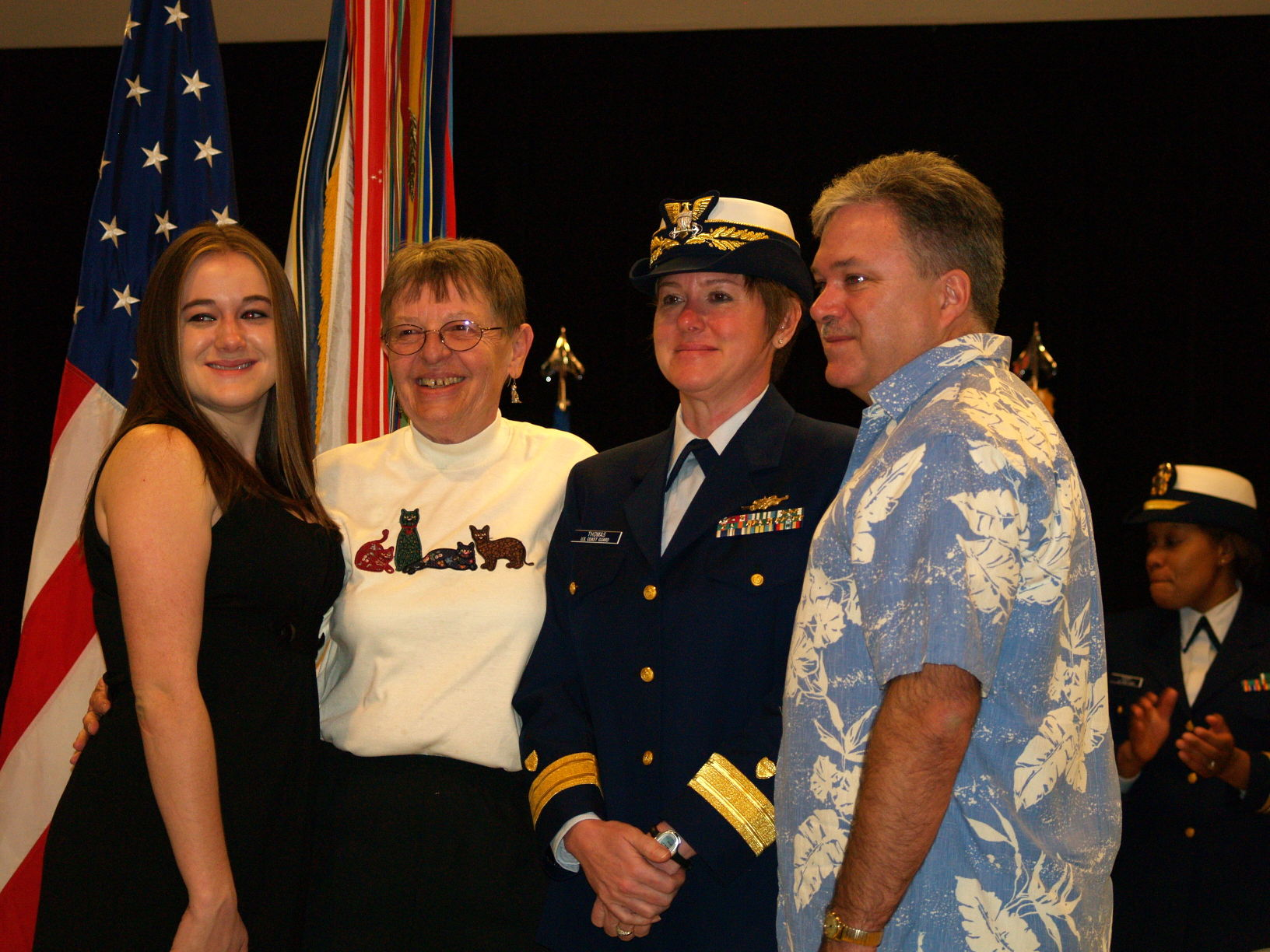
RADM Thomas with her daughter, Andi; mother, Kay; and husband, Gary, following her promotion to Flag rank

Thomas' husband is Commander Gary Thomas, USCG (Retired), who was a former chief of electronic navigation and oversaw the decommissioning of Loran-C transmissions by the Coast Guard. While RADM Thomas served as Fourteenth District Commander, Gary proudly accepted his role as a Coast Guard spouse, actively participating with the Coast Guard Spouses’ Association of Oahu. As is customary for the D14 Commander, they were billeted at the Diamond Head Lighthouse, and he was always quick to correct guests who mistakenly believed he was the Admiral and commented how lucky his wife must be at his assignment. Gary was awarded the swivel shot award upon Cari's retirement, for his service to the Coast Guard community. They have one adult daughter, Andi and a son-in-law, William Viola.
