= Carey High School (Carey, Ohio) =

Public school in Ohio, United States

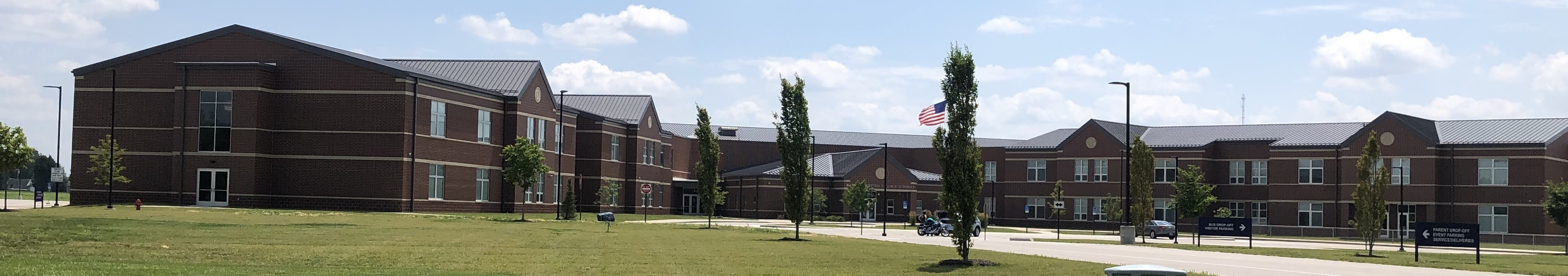

Location
- 2016 Blue Devil Drive; Carey, Ohio 43316
- Coordinates: 40.950°N 83.377°W

Information
- Type: Public
- School district: Carey Exempted Village School District
- Principal: Peter Cole
- Teaching staff: 29.74 (FTE)
- Grades: 6-12
- Enrollment: 463 (2022-23)
- Student to teacher ratio: 15.57
- Colors: Navy Blue and White
- Athletics conference: Northern 10 Athletic Conference
- Mascot: Blue Devil
- Website: www.careyschools.org/page/middlehigh-school-6-12

Carey High School is a public high school in Carey, Ohio. It is the only high school in the Carey Exempted Village Schools district. Their nickname is the Blue Devils. They are members of the Northern 10 Athletic Conference.

== Ohio High School Athletic Association State Championships ==
- Boys Football – 1975 (Class A), 2021 (Division VI)
