= SEAL Team season 4 =

SEAL Team
- Season 4
- Starring: David Boreanaz; Max Thieriot; Jessica Paré; Neil Brown Jr.; A. J. Buckley; Toni Trucks
- No. of episodes: 16

Release
- Original network: CBS
- Original release: December 2, 2020 – May 26, 2021

Season chronology
- ← Previous; Season 3 Next → Season 5

The fourth season of SEAL Team, an American military action drama television series, began airing on CBS on December 2, 2020, and ended on May 26, 2021, with 16 episodes.

For the 2020–21 U.S. television season, the fourth season of SEAL Team ranked 38th with an average of 6.44 million viewers.

== Cast and characters ==
=== Main ===
- David Boreanaz as Master Chief Special Warfare Operator^{[note A]} Jason Hayes a.k.a. Bravo 1/1B
- Max Thieriot as Special Warfare Operator Second Class Clay Spenser a.k.a. Bravo 6/6B
- Jessica Paré as Amanda "Mandy" Ellis (episodes 1–2)
- Neil Brown Jr. as Chief Warrant Officer 2 Raymond "Ray" Perry, a.k.a. Bravo 2/2B
- A. J. Buckley as Special Warfare Operator First Class Sonny Quinn a.k.a. Bravo 3/3B
- Toni Trucks as Lieutenant (junior grade) Lisa Davis
- Judd Lormand as Commander Eric Blackburn (episode 1)

=== Recurring ===
- Tyler Grey as Special Warfare Operator First Class Trent Sawyer a.k.a. Bravo 4/4B
- Justin Melnick as Special Warfare Operator First Class Brock Reynolds a.k.a. Bravo 5/5B
- Kerri Medders as Emma Hayes
- Parisa Fakhri as Naima Perry
- Ammon Jacob Ford as Michael "Mikey" Hayes
- Alona Tal as Stella Baxter
- Scott Foxx as Senior Chief Special Warfare Operator Scott "Full Metal" Carter a.k.a. Bravo 7/7B
- Tim Chiou as Special Warfare Operator Michael "Thirty Mike" Chen a.k.a. Charlie 2/2C

Note:

^{[note A]}Enlisted SEALs have Special Warfare Operator specific ratings. See US Navy SEAL ratings.

== Episodes ==
No. overall	No. in season	Title	Directed by	Written by	Original release date	Prod. code	U.S. viewers (millions)
65	1	"God of War"	David Boreanaz	Spencer Hudnut & Kenny Sheard	December 2, 2020	ST401	4.24
Bravo Team enters enemy territory in the snowy Spīn Ghar mountain range to capture Al-Hazred, the leader of a terrorist group and son of the terrorist leader that Jason killed in his early career. However, the mission goes awry when they are attacked, and Jason and Cerberus, Bravo’s canine member, are separated from the team.
66	2	"Forever War"	Christopher Chulack	Spencer Hudnut & Dana Greenblatt	December 2, 2020	ST402	4.24
Taking place immediately after the previous episode, Bravo Team reunites with Jason and Cerberus and now must go underground to search through many booby-trapped tunnels for terrorist leader Al-Hazred. Once Bravo Team neutralized Al-Hazred, they returned home to deal with their own issues.
67	3	"The New Normal"	Christopher Chulack	Spencer Hudnut	December 9, 2020	ST403	4.47
After Afghanistan, Jason is off from Bravo and is overseeing another team. Clay is benched because he accepts responsibility for writing a letter to the congresswoman’s family. Thirty-Mike is leading Bravo in training exercises, but Bravo is having difficulty adapting to the new normal. Tensions are running high, especially after the CIA agent and Ray are in a cafe when a bomb blows the cafe up in Tunisia.
68	4	"Shockwave"	Ruben Garcia	Tom Mularz	December 16, 2020	ST404	4.48
After Ray survives the cafe bombing, a terrorist group called Ansar Al-Masar kidnaps Ray in the hope of getting a ransom from the U.S. government. His former teammates struggle to help their brother and his family while Bravo Team is sidelined from the rescue operation due to their uncoordinated readiness.
69	5	"The Carrot or The Stick"	Ruben Garcia	Dana Greenblatt	January 13, 2021	ST405	4.03
With no leads on Ray's whereabouts, Jason pushes the Bravo team to extreme lengths and considers crossing a dangerous line to help locate their missing brother. Meanwhile, Ray tries to survive captivity.
70	6	"Horror Has a Face"	J. Michael Muro	Matt Bosack & Mark H. Semos	January 27, 2021	ST406	4.20
As Ensign Davis tracks Ray’s location to a shipping container in the Mediterranean Ocean bound for Syria, Bravo team becomes increasingly desperate to rescue their brother before it’s too late.
71	7	"All In"	Félix Alcalá	Corinne Marrinan & Stephen Gasper	February 17, 2021	ST407	3.78
As Bravo grapples with major changes, the team spins up on a mission in Ecuador. Also, Natalie presents a life-changing idea to Jason.
72	8	"Cover for Action"	Ruben Garcia	Dana Greenblatt & Rashaan Dozier-Escalante	March 3, 2021	ST408	4.16
When Jason returns to Bravo, tensions rise as Ray outranks him on a mission to recover military drones in Jordan.
73	9	"Reckoning"	Ruben Garcia	Tom Mularz & Kenny Sheard	March 10, 2021	ST409	3.46
As Ray continues to lead the mission in Jordan, the stakes grow higher when members of Bravo team learn the truth about their target.
74	10	"A Question of Honor"	Jessica Paré	Ariel Endacott	March 24, 2021	ST410	4.00
Jason's career and freedom hang in the balance when Command accuses him of committing a horrific crime during a mission. With Bravo under a no-contact order, Jason must fight this battle without his brothers.
75	11	"Limits of Loyalty"	Allison Liddi-Brown	Corinne Marrinan	April 7, 2021	ST411	3.57
Jason is put on trial with a potential career-ending outcome, without knowing if his closest friend, Ray, has his back.
76	12	"Rearview Mirror"	Max Thieriot	Kenny Ryan & Jacob Roman	April 21, 2021	ST412	3.52
Jason's visit with a former teammate causes him to reevaluate his role as team leader. Also, several Bravo members grapple with their personal relationships when Command sends them on an unexpected mission to the coast of Africa
77	13	"Do No Harm"	Tyler Grey	Tom Mularz & Kinan Copen	May 5, 2021	ST413	3.74
Bravo is tasked with bringing a defecting Boko Haram lieutenant into U.S. custody, but the mission goes sideways when the target gets attacked.
78	14	"Hollow at the Core"	J. Michael Muro	Matt Bosack & Kenny Sheard	May 12, 2021	ST414	3.54
Bravo is tasked with a covert mission to infiltrate a Boko Haram camp, hack its data network, and rescue an American hostage.
79	15	"Nightmare of My Choice"	David Boreanaz	Spencer Hudnut & Mark H. Semos	May 19, 2021	ST415	3.60
Bravo joins forces with Alpha team to protect a crucial Nigerian pipeline that is under attack by Boko Haram.
80	16	"One Life to Live"	Christopher Chulack	Spencer Hudnut & Dana Greenblatt	May 26, 2021	ST416	3.84
Bravo takes a devastating hit that will change the team forever and forces each member to make major personal decisions.

== Production ==
On May 6, 2020, CBS renewed the series for a fourth season.

== Ratings ==
Viewership and ratings per episode of SEAL Team season 4
No.	Title	Air date	Rating (18–49)	Viewers (millions)	DVR (18–49)	DVR viewers (millions)	Total (18–49)	Total viewers (millions)
1	"God of War"	December 2, 2020	0.5	4.24	TBD	TBD	TBD	TBD
2	"Forever War"	December 2, 2020	0.5	4.24	TBD	TBD	TBD	TBD
3	"The New Normal"	December 9, 2020	0.6	4.47	TBD	TBD	TBD	TBD
4	"Shockwave"	December 16, 2020	0.5	4.48	TBD	TBD	TBD	TBD
5	"The Carrot or The Stick"	January 13, 2021	0.5	4.03	TBD	TBD	TBD	TBD
6	"Horror Has a Face"	January 27, 2021	0.5	4.20	TBD	TBD	TBD	TBD
7	"All In"	February 17, 2021	0.5	3.78	TBD	TBD	TBD	TBD
8	"Cover for Action"	March 3, 2021	0.5	4.16	TBD	TBD	TBD	TBD
9	"Reckoning"	March 10, 2021	0.4	3.46	0.4	2.75	0.8	6.22
10	"A Question of Honor"	March 24, 2021	0.5	4.00	TBD	TBD	TBD	TBD
11	"Limits of Loyalty"	April 7, 2021	0.4	3.57	TBD	TBD	TBD	TBD
12	"Rearview Mirror"	April 21, 2021	0.5	3.52	TBD	TBD	TBD	TBD
13	"Do No Harm"	May 5, 2021	0.4	3.74	0.4	2.58	0.9	6.32
14	"Hollow at the Core"	May 12, 2021	0.4	3.54	0.3	2.31	0.8	5.85
15	"Nightmare of My Choice"	May 19, 2021	0.5	3.60	0.3	2.34	0.8	5.94
16	"One Life to Live"	May 26, 2021	0.5	3.84	0.4	2.50	0.8	6.33

== Home media ==
SEAL Team: Season Four
Set details	Special features	
4 disc; 16 episodes; Subtitled, NTSC		
DVD release dates
Region 1	Region 2	Region 4
September 7, 2021		
