= SEAL Team season 3 =

SEAL Team
- Season 3
- Starring: David Boreanaz; Max Thieriot; Jessica Paré; Neil Brown Jr.; A. J. Buckley; Toni Trucks; Judd Lormand
- No. of episodes: 20

Release
- Original network: CBS
- Original release: October 2, 2019 – May 6, 2020

Season chronology
- ← Previous; Season 2 Next → Season 4

The third season of the American military drama television series SEAL Team premiered on October 2, 2019, and ended on May 6, 2020. Only 20 episodes were produced due to the COVID-19 pandemic in the United States. The season is produced by CBS Television Studios.

== Cast and characters ==
=== Main ===
- David Boreanaz as Master Chief Special Warfare Operator^{[note A]} Jason Hayes a.k.a. Bravo 1/1B
- Max Thieriot as Special Warfare Operator Second Class Clay Spenser a.k.a. Bravo 6/6B
- Jessica Paré as Amanda "Mandy" Ellis
- Neil Brown Jr. as Senior Chief Special Warfare Operator Raymond "Ray" Perry, a.k.a. Bravo 2/2B
- A. J. Buckley as Special Warfare Operator First Class Sonny Quinn a.k.a. Bravo 3/3B
- Toni Trucks as Ensign Lisa Davis
- Judd Lormand as Lieutenant Commander Eric Blackburn

=== Recurring ===
- Tyler Grey as Special Warfare Operator First Class Trent Sawyer a.k.a. Bravo 4/4B
- Justin Melnick as Special Warfare Operator First Class Brock Reynolds a.k.a. Bravo 5/5B
- Kerri Medders as Emma Hayes
- Parisa Fakhri as Naima Perry
- Ammon Jacob Ford as Michael "Mikey" Hayes
- Alona Tal as Stella Baxter
- Scott Foxx as Senior Chief Special Warfare Operator Scott "Full Metal" Carter a.k.a. Alpha 1/1A
- Lucca De Oliveira as Special Warfare Operator First Class Victor "Vic" Lopez
- Jamie McShane as Captain Grayson Lindell
- Emily Swallow as Dr. Natalie Pierce
- Adelaide Kane as Rebecca Bowen

=== Guest ===
- Tim Chiou as Special Warfare Operator Michael "Thirty Mike" Chen a.k.a. Charlie 2/2C

Note:

^{[note A]}Enlisted SEALs have Special Warfare Operator specific ratings. See US Navy SEAL ratings.

== Episodes ==
No. overall	No. in season	Title	Directed by	Written by	Original release date	Prod. code	U.S. viewers (millions)
45	1	"Welcome to the Refuge"	Christopher Chulack	John Glenn & Spencer Hudnut	October 2, 2019	ST301	5.25
Jason and his team are in Serbia attempting to track down an organization linked to the bombing of multiple American military outposts. Meanwhile, Clay returns following his injuries and Jason struggles with PTSD.
46	2	"Ignore and Override"	Christopher Chulack	John Glenn & Spencer Hudnut	October 9, 2019	ST302	4.77
Following the bombing in Belgrade, Jason continues to struggle with PTSD. Bravo continues their mission to apprehend the bomber. Meanwhile, Ray confronts Sonny about his relationship with Lisa.
47	3	"Theory and Methodology"	Ruben Garcia	Holly Harold	October 16, 2019	ST303	4.47
Bravo Team is sent to Azerbaijan to help an American soldier retake a power plant in order to avoid political instability in the area. The team welcomes a new commanding officer, who forces Clay to stop his attempts to raise awareness of traumatic brain injuries following Swanny's suicide. Meanwhile, Jason is still reeling from the aftermath of his mission in Serbia and Ray decides to become a Warrant Officer to support his family. Sonny and Lisa struggle to make time for their relationship.
48	4	"The Strength of the Wolf"	Allison Liddi-Brown	John Glenn & Kenny Ryan & Jacob Roman	October 23, 2019	ST305	4.49
The team interviews SEAL candidates for a spot to join them. Bravo must execute a difficult rescue mission at sea to free several American hostages being held on a ship sailing close to Chinese territorial waters.
49	5	"All Along the Watchtower: Part 1"	Alexis Ostrander	Tom Mularz	October 30, 2019	ST306	4.40
Bravo Team is tasked to be the security detail for a U.S. Ambassador who is travelling to North Yemen. Ambassador Marsden is on a mission to broker a peace deal between two warring tribes. Jason suggests that Ray and Sonny depart early to act as bodyguards for Ambassador Mardsen, but Ray requests Clay instead.
50	6	"All Along the Watchtower: Part 2"	Ruben Garcia	Dana Greenblatt	November 6, 2019	ST307	4.52
With their compound in North Yemen under heavy fire, Bravo must fight their way out, but Ambassador Marsden wants one last chance for a truce between the rival tribes.
51	7	"The Ones You Can't See"	Ruben Garcia	Dana Greenblatt	November 20, 2019	ST304	4.69
Bravo Team is deployed to Paris, at the behest of the Secret Service, to provide extra security at an important summit. Jason stays behind due to his hip injury
52	8	"Danger Crossing"	Michael Watkins	Holly Harold	November 27, 2019	ST308	5.77
With Jason recovering from his hip surgery, Ray is again Bravo's Team Leader on a highly classified rescue mission to bring back a Marine Corps pilot shot down over Iran. Clay will be awarded a Bronze Star with "V" device for his combat actions in North Yemen. Jason goes to the psychiatrist to help him with his PTSD.
53	9	"Kill or Cure"	Gonzalo Amat	Tom Mularz	December 4, 2019	ST309	5.44
Bravo Team is sent to Liberia to protect medical aid workers and recover stolen batches of Ebola virus that could be weaponized by the local militia. Jason's relationship with Dr. Natalie Pierce grows closer. Ensign Davis visits her sister and gets into an altercation at a bar afterwards. Jason continues with therapy sessions.
54	10	"Unbecoming an Officer"	Tyler Grey	Dana Greenblatt	December 11, 2019	ST310	5.85
Clay introduces his girlfriend, Rebecca, to the team. Sonny decides to use the new guy as a wing-man, hurting Clay's feelings. Ensign Davis' conduct is called into question after the bar altercation. Clay tells Sonny he figured out his "girl" was Davis. A fully healed Jason and Bravo Team deploy to Bangladesh to capture Russian warlord Yevgenny Kostarov. An explosion kills Kostarov and destroys the staircases, making escape, as well as getting needed information, difficult. The team races home from their deployment to help Ensign Davis. Ray is advised not to give support in order to make sure his career is on track. Clay attends an event with Rebecca and admits to having thought of his career on a bigger stage.
55	11	"Siege Protocol: Part 1"	Gonzalo Amat	Matt Bosack	February 26, 2020	ST311	4.33
Emma surprises Jason at home with Natalie. Clay is working Washington with his girlfriend, earning them the label of "power couple." Stella suddenly reappears in his life. Ray appears before the review board for his Warrant Officer status. Bravo Team is deployed to Caracas in order to extract three American hostages from captivity by Hezbollah operatives. Mandy has a CIA asset inside to whom she's promised safety, but complications arise when the local secret police force lays siege to their designated safe house.
56	12	"Siege Protocol: Part 2"	Gonzalo Amat	Kenny Sheard	February 26, 2020	ST313	3.97
Davis, Blackburn, Ellis, and Warrant Officer Mack barricade themselves in the safehouse in order to protect sensitive data from falling into enemy hands until Bravo's arrival. Ellis deduces that her CIA asset, a British doctor, has been captured by local police and convinces Bravo Team to conduct a rescue operation to save the doctor. With the help of the third hostage, who was revealed to be an undercover CIA agent, Bravo Team interrogates a local officer and learns the location of the safehouse where the doctor is being held captive, but an explosion destroys the building during the raid.
57	13	"Fog of War"	Christopher Chulack	Spencer Hudnut & Mark H. Semos	March 4, 2020	ST312	4.59
Bravo Team's attempt to rescue Ellis' asset results in a mission failure, with the doctor being killed in the explosion. While on a return flight to Virginia Beach, Bravo Team, Ellis, and Davis recount the details of the raid in order to find out the cause of the explosion. Ellis and Davis learn that a reconnaissance drone was flying over Bravo Team's target building and that their newest recruit, Special Warfare operator Victor Lopez, was responsible for throwing a high-explosive grenade into the room, unaware that the machine-gunner he was attempting to kill was in the same room as the hostage. Feeling betrayed that Lopez was willing to let Ray blame himself for throwing the grenade, Jason kicks him out of the room so that Bravo Team can discuss what should they do about him. After being called back to the room, Lopez explains that he panicked and asks for Ray's forgiveness. Ray forgives him, but still doesn't trust him. He removes Lopez's SEAL Trident patch and Jason kicks him off the team.
58	14	"Objects in Mirror"	David Cook	Tom Mularz	March 11, 2020	ST314	4.91
Bravo Team is deployed into Turkmenistan to rescue a Pakistani scientist from the country's intelligence agency, using a foreign defense training program as their cover story for the operation.
59	15	"Rules of Engagement"	J. Michael Muro	Holly Harold & Kenny Ryan & Jacob Roman	March 18, 2020	ST315	4.92
Bravo Team is deployed to Niger to protect an American-built dam from destruction by Boko Haram fighters in the region. After a nightmare Jason goes back to therapy.
60	16	"Last Known Location"	Larry Teng	Stephen Gasper & Dana Greenblatt	March 25, 2020	ST316	5.10
After a successful mission in Indonesia, Bravo team returns home to find tensions running high on the home front. Captain Lindell informs Sonny that he has to attend six weeks of advanced armory school, punishment for his recent bar altercation, and will not deploy with Bravo to Afghanistan. Things get out of hand at Sonny's pre-deployment barbecue.
61	17	"Drawdown"	Max Thieriot	Matt Bosack & Mark H. Semos	April 8, 2020	ST317	4.89
As Bravo Team begins their deployment in Afghanistan during peace negotiations, Sonny reports to an Air Force base in Texas to serve his disciplinary training action, where he gets reacquainted with Hannah, a childhood friend. Jason is angry when he finds out that Clay has accepted a position in the STA-21 sailor-to-commissioned officer program. Still reeling from Clay's news, Jason decides to send him to another base, where he feels Clay's presence will be less of a distraction to Bravo Team.
62	18	"Edge of Nowhere"	Christine Moore	Rashaan Dozier-Escalante & Tom Mularz	April 22, 2020	ST318	5.82
Bravo Team engages in a firefight when they apprehend an Afghan high value target. Meanwhile, at Combat Outpost Redding, Clay successfully eliminates a Taliban mortar team that has been targeting the base. With relations improving with his father, Sonny considers staying in Texas permanently.
63	19	"In The Blind"	Allison Liddi-Brown	Corinne Marrinan & Kenny Ryan & Jacob Roman	April 29, 2020	ST319	5.75
We open with a scared Afghan boy who witnesses the death of his father at the hands of US forces. Back in Texas, Sonny starts to wonder if his time in the teams might be coming to an end and that maybe he should move back home to his father, the Quinn family ranch - and his first love, Hannah. At Camp Larkin, Ray receives some tough spiritual advice from the camp’s chaplain. Brock has concerns about his dog, Cerberus. When questioned by the puzzled Jason, Brock seems to suspect that the canine may be reaching a point of exhaustion due to the effects of too much war - and too many missions. Bravo Team, accompanied by Agent Reiss, are tasked with extracting a High Value Target from an Afghan police station. Just moments after they depart the station with their suspect, a vehicle loaded with explosives slams into the station and detonates with devastating effect. Bravo soon find themselves pinned down by two very capable Taliban snipers. A game of cat and mouse ensues with the team trying to locate and effectively hit back at the snipers. Eventually, the wounded Ray gets the crucial shot and eliminates both sharpshooters. Just in time, the Marines Quick Reaction Force arrives and helps eliminate the remaining Taliban besiegers. Back at Camp Larkin, Mandy is devastated when she learns of the murder of Samim - the confidential informant she had pressured for intel. Finally, under questioning, the suspect that Bravo retrieved from the police station, reveals that the deadly new organisation Tahara, is headed by Azfaar Al-Hazred. This name stuns the team as Azfaar’s father was the infamous Asmin Al-Hazred who was the first HVT to be eliminated by SEAL operators in the early days of the war on terror. In a shocking coda, we learn that the scared young Afghan boy we saw at the beginning of the episode, was none other than Azfaar who witnessed his father’s death and has now grown up to be the leader of Tahara. What’s more, there is an intimate connection between the Al-Hazreds and Bravo team…
64	20	"No Choice in Duty"	Ruben Garcia	Holly Harold & Brian Beneker	May 6, 2020	ST320	4.54
Sonny rejoins the rest of Bravo in Afghanistan. Jason escorts Mandy on a condolence visit to the family of Samim. Meanwhile, Ray leads Bravo Team on an urgent mission to capture a courier who could lead them to terrorist leader Azfaar Al-Hazred. There is much reflection after the mission from the team.

== Production ==
On May 9, 2019, CBS renewed the series for a third season.

On July 10, 2019, it was reported that Jamie McShane and Rudy Dobrev were cast in recurring roles for the third season. On August 7, 2019, Emily Swallow was cast in a recurring capacity for the third season.

== Ratings ==
Viewership and ratings per episode of SEAL Team season 3
No.	Title	Air date	Rating/share (18–49)	Viewers (millions)	DVR (18–49)	DVR viewers (millions)	Total (18–49)	Total viewers (millions)
1	"Welcome to the Refuge"	October 2, 2019	0.7/3	5.25	0.7	3.55	1.4	8.80
2	"Ignore and Override"	October 9, 2019	0.6/3	4.77	0.6	3.13	1.2	7.90
3	"Theory and Methodology"	October 16, 2019	0.6/3	4.47	0.6	3.13	1.2	7.60
4	"The Strength of the Wolf"	October 23, 2019	0.7/3	4.50	0.5	3.10	1.2	7.60
5	"All Along the Watchtower: Part 1"	October 30, 2019	0.6/3	4.40	0.5	2.85	1.2	7.25
6	"All Along the Watchtower: Part 2"	November 6, 2019	0.6/3	4.52	0.5	2.94	1.1	7.47
7	"The Ones You Can't See"	November 20, 2019	0.7/3	4.69	0.6	3.33	1.3	8.02
8	"Danger Crossing"	November 27, 2019	0.8/4	5.77	0.6	3.09	1.4	8.87
9	"Kill or Cure"	December 4, 2019	0.7/4	5.44	0.6	3.09	1.3	8.54
10	"Unbecoming an Officer"	December 11, 2019	0.7/4	5.85	0.5	2.89	1.2	8.75
11	"Siege Protocol: Part 1"	February 26, 2020	0.6	4.33	0.5	3.12	1.1	7.45
12	"Siege Protocol: Part 2"	February 26, 2020	0.5	3.97	0.6	3.48	1.1	7.45
13	"Fog of War"	March 4, 2020	0.6	4.59	0.6	3.02	1.2	7.63
14	"Objects in Mirror"	March 11, 2020	0.7	4.91	0.4	2.60	1.1	7.51
15	"Rules of Engagement"	March 18, 2020	0.7	4.92	0.6	3.36	1.3	8.29
16	"Last Known Location"	March 25, 2020	0.7	5.10	0.5	3.13	1.2	8.23
17	"Drawdown"	April 8, 2020	0.6	4.89	0.6	3.17	1.2	8.04
18	"Edge of Nowhere"	April 22, 2020	0.7	5.82	0.5	2.71	1.2	8.54
19	"In The Blind"	April 29, 2020	0.8	5.75	0.5	2.70	1.3	8.45
20	"No Choice in Duty"	May 6, 2020	0.6	4.54	0.5	3.26	1.1	7.80

== Home media ==
SEAL Team: Season Three
Set details	Special features	
5 disc; 20 episodes; NTSC, Widescreen; 14 hours and 18 minutes	Welcome to Serbia; Shifting Gears; Lights, Camera, Execute; Worlds Apart	
DVD release dates
Region 1	Region 2	Region 4
August 25, 2020		
