= SEAL Team season 2 =

SEAL Team
- Season 2
- Starring: David Boreanaz; Max Thieriot; Jessica Paré; Neil Brown Jr.; A. J. Buckley; Toni Trucks; Judd Lormand
- No. of episodes: 22

Release
- Original network: CBS
- Original release: October 3, 2018 – May 22, 2019

Season chronology
- ← Previous; Season 1 Next → Season 3

The second season of the American military drama television series SEAL Team premiered on CBS on October 3, 2018, and concluded on May 22, 2019. A total of 22 episodes were produced.

== Cast and characters ==
=== Main ===
- David Boreanaz as Master Chief Special Warfare Operator^{[note A]} Jason Hayes a.k.a. Bravo 1/1B
- Max Thieriot as Special Warfare Operator Second Class Clay Spenser a.k.a. Bravo 6/6B
- Jessica Paré as Amanda "Mandy" Ellis
- Neil Brown Jr. as Senior Chief Special Warfare Operator Raymond "Ray" Perry, a.k.a. Bravo 2/2B
- A. J. Buckley as Special Warfare Operator First Class Sonny Quinn a.k.a. Bravo 3/3B
- Toni Trucks as Ensign Lisa Davis
- Judd Lormand as Lieutenant Commander Eric Blackburn

=== Recurring ===
- Tyler Grey as Special Warfare Operator First Class Trent Sawyer a.k.a. Bravo 4/4B
- Justin Melnick as Special Warfare Operator First Class Brock Reynolds a.k.a. Bravo 5/5B
- Michaela McManus as Alana Hayes
- Kerri Medders as Emma Hayes
- Parisa Fakhri as Naima Perry
- Ammon Jacob Ford as Michael "Mikey" Hayes
- Alona Tal as Stella Baxter
- Tamala Jones as Gunnery Sergeant Miller
- Michael Irby as Master Chief Special Warfare Operator Adam Siever
- Scott Foxx as Senior Chief Special Warfare Operator Scott "Full Metal" Carter a.k.a. Alpha 1/1A
- Ruffin Prentiss as Navy Explosive Ordnance Disposal technician Summer Kairos
- Michael McGrady as Captain Harrington,
- Mirelly Taylor as Rita Alfaro, a CISEN agent serving as Mandy's liaison for the team's operations in Mexico.
- Felix Solis as Colonel Martinez
- Bobby Daniel Rodriguez as Lieutenant Lopez

=== Guest ===
- Tony Curran as Retired Senior Chief Special Warfare Operator Brett Swann

Note:

^{[note A]}Enlisted SEALs have Special Warfare Operator specific ratings. See US Navy SEAL ratings.

== Episodes ==
No. overall	No. in season	Title	Directed by	Written by	Original release date	Prod. code	U.S. viewers (millions)
23	1	"Fracture"	Christopher Chulack	John Glenn & Spencer Hudnut	October 3, 2018	ST201	5.02
Six months have passed since Jason's hallucination episode. Jason has medically recovered and is leading the team again, Spenser is now Ray's replacement as second-in-command, and now an Explosives Ordnance Disposal Technician is recruited into the team. Their latest mission involves a hostage-rescue and bomb disposal mission on an oil platform in the Gulf of Guinea, which has been overrun by a new terrorist organization. Meanwhile, Ray contemplates joining another SEAL team after being rebuffed by Jason, who says he doesn't trust him anymore. Also, Jason has been living with Alana and the children during recovery and is now looking for a house of his own near them.
24	2	"Never Say Die"	Nelson McCormick	Jon Worley	October 10, 2018	ST203	5.46
The team is relocated to Saudi Arabia in order to stop a Shiite extremist group from deploying anthrax into a major aquifer, working alongside local troops. Meanwhile, Mandy works an operation in Mexico to find a D.E.A. agent before joining them. When there's a cave in inside the tunnel and lose communication with Jason and Sonny, the Saudi general wants to bomb the site. Clay and the rest of Bravo work to remove the debris while Jason and Sonny neutralize the terrorist threat, and manage to make contact just in time to stop the bombing. During the aftermath, Spenser meets Stella's parents, who're not keen on their daughter being with a soldier, and Ray makes his rift with Jason public to the team after Jason confronts him about his interest in join Charlie Team. Back home, Jason is approached by a local Sheriff, being notified that Alana was involved in a car accident.
25	3	"The Worst of Conditions"	Christopher Chulack	Holly Harold	October 17, 2018	ST202	5.40
Jason rushes to the hospital, only to learn that Alana has died. While holding a funeral for Alana, Jason is forced to step down as team leader to focus on his children, with fellow SEAL Adam Seaver taking his place. Jason's mother, Linda comes to help. Ray joins the rest of the team at Jason’s request and is deployed to Mumbai to rescue a foreign service officer, only to find out their hostage has been relocated.
26	4	"All That Matters"	Gonzalo Amat	Duppy Demetrius	October 24, 2018	ST204	5.38
While the team saves the foreign service officer in the hotel, they are given the additional task of rescuing hostages at a local university. Meanwhile, Jason resigns from Bravo Team in order to mend his relationship with his children.
27	5	"Say Again Your Last"	Silver Tree	Dana Greenblatt	October 31, 2018	ST205	5.33
After Adam is killed by a suicide bomber, Clay freezes up and Ray has to take charge. The team is forced to continue their hostage rescue, which they manage to do successfully while killing the terrorists. Afterwards, Clay steals a car to go back to pick up Adam's body. The CIA discovers a Pakistani politician backed up the attack, but since they won't get involved, Mandy gives the information to the locals. Meanwhile, Jason has to notify Adam’s widow, Victoria. Emma accompanies him and listens to him talking with Victoria. After they return home, Emma tells him she understands now and that he should go back, otherwise he will rot. When the team comes back, Jason joins them carrying Adam's casket out the plane.
28	6	"Hold What You Got"	Kenneth Fink	Spencer Hudnut & Mark Semos	November 7, 2018	ST206	5.61
Six weeks after their last mission, Bravo Team is deployed to Mexico in order to hunt down a drug cartel led by Andres Doza, who is responsible for killing a D.E.A. agent. While conducting a joint operation with the Mexican Marines led by Colonel Martinez, Jason makes the decision for his team to not pursue their high-value target after coming across a group of kidnapped civilians in a cartel safehouse. Mexican Marine Lieutenant Lopez, who is well-known in the neighborhood of their mission area, is identified by the HVT, and is marked for death in the aftermath of the operation.
29	7	"Outside the Wire"	J. Michael Muro	John Glenn & Julian Silver & Reiss Clauson-Wolf	November 14, 2018	ST207	5.17
Intelligence recovered from retrieved cell phones during the previous operation has Bravo Team surveilling a businessman tied to the cartel. However, the businessman is killed during the operation. To salvage the failure, Bravo Team conducts a successful kidnapping operation on the CEO of a modeling agency who is also currently affiliated with the cartel. During the aftermath of the operation, Clay confesses to Sonny about his break-up while Jason and Ray intervene in preventing Lopez’s surrender to the cartel.
30	8	"Parallax"	Jann Turner	Holly Harold & Teresa Huang	November 21, 2018	ST208	5.93
Interrogation of the CEO leads Bravo Team to Doza's best friend and second-in-command, Luis Castillo. In order to draw him out of the shadows, the SEALs and Mexican Marines assault an improvised drug lab at a re-purposed pottery factory, disguising themselves as a rival cartel. The joint team is then tasked with a surveillance mission on Castillo in order to facilitate his apprehension. However, the team unknowingly drives into an ambush while tailing Castillo.
31	9	"Santa Muerte"	Larry Teng	John Glenn & Jon Worley	December 5, 2018	ST209	5.31
The SEALs, a wounded Colonel Martinez, and a wounded Castillo are forced to take shelter in a church while waiting for reinforcements led by Lieutenant Commander Blackburn and Lieutenant Lopez. Meanwhile, Mandy learns that her CISEN counterpart, Rita, is the unwilling mole responsible for leaking the SEAL operations to Doza. In the aftermath, Martinez succumbs to his wounds while Ray learns of Doza’s safehouse location during Castillo’s dying moments.
32	10	"Prisoner's Dilemma"	Thomas Carter	Tom Mularz & Jon Worley	December 12, 2018	ST210	6.59
While raiding Doza’s safehouse, Bravo Team learns that Doza’s escape plan is to surrender himself into Mexican police custody for immunity in Chiapas while painting the SEALs as villains. Seeing this as a farce, Jason and Mandy use the 24-hour deadline for the SEALs' exit from Mexico as a last opportunity to raid Doza’s mansion. Bravo Team, with the aid of Lopez, successfully captures Doza, but is forced into a stand-off with the local Chiapas state police. Seeing no other option, Lopez executes Doza in a fit of rage. When the supervising officer arrives inside Doza’s bedroom, Jason convinces the officer to stage Doza’s death as a suicide in order to avoid further political scandals and spare Lopez from prosecution. In the aftermath of the operation, Jason confesses to Alana’s grave his fears about being a good father to their children.
33	11	"Backwards in High Heels"	Ruben Garcia	Holly Harold & Dana Greenblatt	January 2, 2019	ST211	6.23
Bravo Team conducts a joint-operation with the British 22 SAS Regiment to rescue passengers of a plane, direct from Tunis to Barcelona, hijacked at Doha airport by an armed group of terrorists. Jason locks horns with the SAS' Sergeant Major before they find common ground. After negotiations fail, Jason's plan to blow the landing gear gives them the opening they need for a successful rescue. Clay hooks up with a girl in a bar while Sonny and Lisa sleep together.
34	12	"Things Not Seen"	Michael Watkins	Teleplay by : Kenny Ryan & Jacob Roman; Story by : Kenny Ryan & Jacob Roman & Tom Mularz	January 9, 2019	ST212	5.57
Bravo Team is deployed from Turkey alongside the Syrian border in order to save an American woman, who was formerly an ISIS bride, held captive in a city mausoleum by numerous militants of the terrorist group. Meanwhile, Clay has a contentious reunion with his father, partly because of his work as a writer, and Sonny is disappointed to find out about Davis' aspirations for Officer Candidate School.
35	13	"Time to Shine"	Christopher Chulack	John Glenn & Spencer Hudnut & Mark Semos	January 23, 2019	ST213	5.08
Bravo Team is extracted off the coast of North Korea after having located suspect Iranian cargo. As they reach the submarine, they must use the torpedo tubes to board, as the lock-out chamber is faulty. Sonny is last to be retrieved when the tube suffers a malfunction, trapping him inside. Unable to open the inner hatch to release him, the team plans to keep his spirits up when Sonny reports a serious leak. As a DPRK submarine heads towards them, the submarine runs ultra-quiet. With the tube flooding and Sonny's air dwindling, the rescue is put on hold, as the safety of the whole boat, so close to enemy territorial waters, takes precedence. With a few seconds to spare, the submarine's captain finally allows them to open the hatch and retrieve Sonny.
36	14	"What Appears to Be"	Holly Dale	Brian Beneker	March 20, 2019	ST214	4.89
Emma is admitted into a prestigious New York art school, but Jason doesn't want her to go because he needs her help with Michael. Lisa tells Sonny a failed relationship is not worth losing their friendship. The team is sent to the Democratic Republic of Congo when a new warlord kills several Americans who were building a hospital. When they capture him, he offers them his boss, supposedly killed a year before. They track him to a house, but they can't confirm he's inside and the aerial attack of the Congolese military is called off. Lisa admits she will regret it if she doesn't give Sonny a chance. Jason understands he needs to allow Emma to make her own way. Clay leaves the flat he shared with Stella and moves to base.
37	15	"You Only Die Once"	J. Michael Muro	Julian Silver & Reiss Clauson-Wolf	March 27, 2019	ST215	3.91
Brett Swann, a former member of Bravo Team, comes to visit them. Bravo Team is sent on a special mission to eliminate the Hezbollah member behind several terrorist attacks. The problem is that he's going to be in a small town in Iran near the border of Afghanistan and they have to kill him from Afghanistan without crossing the border. Things get complicated when the terrorists change the meeting place and force them into a more exposed position, from which they're seen by two young boys who warn the people in town. Ray misses the shot, as Bravo is under attack, and a unit of Marines from the local base comes to their rescue. Back on base, Lisa tells them she's been accepted into Officer Candidate School. Jason goes on a date with Adam's widow, but both find it strange. Afterwards, he goes to a bar and hooks up with a woman with whom he previously flirted.
38	16	"Dirt, Dirt, Gucci"	Holly Dale	John Glenn & Jon Worley	April 3, 2019	ST216	3.73
After a "going-away" party is held for Lisa, Bravo Team is stationed in the Philippines to help train the local Filipino SEALs. They are then tasked with investigating an airplane crash on a remote island in the South China Sea to recover any high-value targets or hacking technology responsible for causing engineered ship and airplane crashes. Bravo Team successfully recovers the sole survivor of the plane crash and evades the investigating Chinese Special Forces team. During the aftermath, Ray drinks at a bar to forget about his lingering trauma from Mexico.
39	17	"Paradise Lost"	Allison Liddi-Brown	Tom Mularz	April 10, 2019	ST217	4.44
Bravo Team takes the Filipino Special Forces through a training raid on an oil rig. Davis has a panic attack during a firefighting drill. Bravo is drinking in a bar in Manila when a bomb goes off, and they treat the wounded. A second bomb goes off, severely injuring Clay who they stabilize before he is evacuated back to the US with life-threatening injuries. Mandy calmly gathers evidence from the scene.
40	18	"Payback"	Guy Ferland	Dana Greenblatt & Teresa Huang	April 17, 2019	ST218	4.59
Clay is recovering in hospital, but his right leg is badly injured, and he faces a long hard rehab if he is to make it back to the team. Despondent, he ignores messages from the team, but Swanny snaps him out of it, and Davis takes leave to visit him. Bravo team has been relocated to Guam to recuperate and is forced to see a psychiatrist, Jason's hook-up. Mandy has found the local group responsible for the bombings, but suspects there is more going on. Bravo team, backed up by the Filipinos, raids their base and captures their leader for intelligence. They are ordered to evacuate as reinforcements approach, but Jason ignores Mandy's advice, and they stay to get some payback.
41	19	"Medicate and Isolate"	Ruben Garcia	Spencer Hudnut & Kenny Ryan & Jacob Roman	April 24, 2019	ST219	3.90
Bravo Team is sent to recover the body of a United States Army Special Forces captain who was killed during an ambush by numerous Islamic terrorists in the savannah of southern Mali. Meanwhile, Clay accompanies Swann to the Veteran's Hospital, where he hopes to get his Traumatic Brain Injury diagnosed and treated. When the bureaucracy refuses, Swann shoots himself in the parking lot.
42	20	"Rock Bottom"	Michael Watkins	Holly Harold & Mark H. Semos	May 1, 2019	ST220	4.68
Clay works to change things so that what happened to Swann won't happen to anyone else. In the Guam base, tensions run high between Ray and Jason, who come to blows in a bar. To graduate from OCS, Lisa must retake the fire drill. She visits her sister and explains that, because she barely had time to save her, she couldn't go back for their younger sister, who died. She believes it was their alcoholic mother's fault for leaving them home alone. Lisa passes the test and graduates as Ensign, but finds Clay, instead of her sister, in her guest's seat. Meanwhile, after a second attack on a hotel in Phuket, Bravo Team is tasked with conducting a raid on the maritime port of Bangkok in order to prevent an imminent attack on an American warship. With the capture of a dangerous former member of the Pakistani secret services linked to the cells in South Asia, Mandy and Blackburn get a mission approved against Yasim Khan, the Saudi top terrorist who masterminded all the previous attacks in the Philippines and Thailand and is currently operating in the volatile Kashmir region. As the team HALOs in, Ray's parachute lines get tangled and he is forced to cut himself free.
43	21	"My Life for Yours"	David Boreanaz	John Glenn & Spencer Hudnut	May 8, 2019	ST221	4.13
Bravo Team wants to rescue Ray, who managed to deploy his reserve chute and land in hostile territory in northern Pakistan, but they are ordered to complete the primary mission. However, after having considered that his presence could lead to a serious diplomatic incident, Blackburn authorises a rescue mission. Stella visits Clay and they talk about Swann; Clay enlists his father, a former SEAL, in his campaign to get Swann a Purple Heart. Ray tries to stay alive while Bravo is on the way to find him, aided by information from Mandy's Indian contact. Ray takes a woman hostage in a village, but his crisis of faith leads to indecision. Mandy convinces her Indian contact to extract the team in exchange for the location of Bashir Varma, a wanted terrorist-turned-C.I.A. asset. Ray lets the woman go and flees. As his pursuers get close on him, he prays and Bravo Team arrives just in time to save him. Finally, an Indian Air Force helicopter airlifts them all to safety.
44	22	"Never Out of the Fight"	Christopher Chulack	John Glenn & Spencer Hudnut	May 22, 2019	ST222	4.24
Commander Shaw orders Bravo Team to disband for failing to complete the mission, but Mandy manages to track Khan to an important meeting in Lahore and Bravo is the only team that can get there in time. They successfully assault the building from the roof while gathering evidence from the scene, capture Khan, and kill four highly wanted terrorists. The team returns to Virginia Beach, where they are greeted by friends and relatives before holding a funeral mass for Swann. The C.I.A. demotes Mandy to a desk job for giving up Varma, while Lisa and Sonny spend time together before she is posted to San Diego. Clay and Stella reunite, Ray baptizes his son, and Jason drives Emma to college in New York before putting his house up for sale.

== Production ==
=== Development ===
On March 27, 2018, CBS renewed the series for a second season. On May 22, 2018, it was reported that both Cavell and Redlich were exiting their roles as executive producer and showrunner, and John Glenn replacing him as showrunner.

=== Casting ===
On August 8, 2018, it was announced that Michael McGrady and Ruffin Prentiss would recur as Captain Harrington and Summer Kairos in the series' second season. On August 15, 2018, it was reported that Judd Lormand had been upgraded to series regular for season 2.

== Ratings ==
Viewership and ratings per episode of SEAL Team season 2
No.	Title	Air date	Rating/share (18–49)	Viewers (millions)	DVR (18–49)	DVR viewers (millions)	Total (18–49)	Total viewers (millions)
1	"Fracture"	October 3, 2018	0.8/3	5.02	0.7	3.31	1.5	8.33
2	"Never Say Die"	October 10, 2018	0.9/4	5.46	0.6	3.18	1.5	8.59
3	"The Worst of Conditions"	October 17, 2018	0.8/3	5.40	0.7	3.16	1.5	8.58
4	"All That Matters"	October 24, 2018	0.8/3	5.38	0.7	3.21	1.5	8.59
5	"Say Again Your Last"	October 31, 2018	0.8/3	5.33	0.7	3.20	1.5	8.54
6	"Hold What You Got"	November 7, 2018	0.9/4	5.61	0.6	3.40	1.5	9.02
7	"Outside the Wire"	November 14, 2018	0.8/3	5.17	0.6	3.18	1.4	8.36
8	"Parallax"	November 21, 2018	0.9/4	5.93	0.7	3.24	1.6	9.17
9	"Santa Muerte"	December 5, 2018	0.8/3	5.31	0.6	3.32	1.4	8.63
10	"Prisoner's Dilemma"	December 12, 2018	1.0/4	6.59	0.6	3.11	1.6	9.70
11	"Backwards in High Heels"	January 2, 2019	0.8/3	6.23	0.7	3.37	1.5	9.60
12	"Things Not Seen"	January 9, 2019	0.8/3	5.57	0.7	3.50	1.5	9.08
13	"Time to Shine"	January 23, 2019	0.8/4	5.08	0.8	3.89	1.6	8.98
14	"What Appears To Be"	March 20, 2019	0.7/4	4.89	0.7	3.78	1.4	8.68
15	"You Only Die Once"	March 27, 2019	0.6/3	3.91	0.7	3.86	1.3	7.78
16	"Dirt, Dirt, Gucci"	April 3, 2019	0.6/3	3.73	0.6	3.67	1.2	7.40
17	"Paradise Lost"	April 10, 2019	0.6/3	4.44	0.6	3.40	1.2	7.86
18	"Payback"	April 17, 2019	0.7/4	4.59	0.7	3.73	1.4	8.33
19	"Medicate and Isolate"	April 24, 2019	0.7/3	3.90	0.6	3.75	1.3	7.65
20	"Rock Bottom"	May 1, 2019	0.6/3	4.68	0.7	3.40	1.3	8.09
21	"My Life for Yours"	May 8, 2019	0.6/3	4.13	0.6	3.33	1.2	7.46
22	"Never Out of the Fight"	May 22, 2019	0.6/4	4.08	0.7	3.71	1.3	7.78

== Home media ==
SEAL Team: Season Two
Set details	Special features	
5 disc; 22 episodes; NTSC; 15 hours and 41 minutes		
DVD release dates
Region 1	Region 2	Region 4
September 10, 2019	November 18, 2019	
