= SEAL Team season 1 =

SEAL Team
- Season 1
- Starring: David Boreanaz; Max Thieriot; Jessica Paré; Neil Brown Jr.; A. J. Buckley; Toni Trucks
- No. of episodes: 22

Release
- Original network: CBS
- Original release: September 27, 2017 – May 16, 2018

Season chronology
- Next → Season 2

The first season of SEAL Team, an American military drama television series, premiered on CBS on September 27, 2017, and ended on May 16, 2018, with a total of 22 episodes. Created by Benjamin Cavell, the series follows an elite unit of United States Navy SEALs portrayed by David Boreanaz, Max Thieriot, Jessica Paré, Neil Brown Jr., A. J. Buckley, and Toni Trucks.

CBS ordered another Navy SEAL project in January 2017 following the success of History Channel's Six. Boreanaz was cast in the lead in March 2017 after Jim Caviezel left the project the same month. The pilot was ordered to series, and was titled SEAL Team in May.

The first season of SEAL Team ranked #28 with an average of 9.87 million viewers. On March 27, 2018, CBS renewed the series for a second season which premiered on October 3, 2018.

== Cast and characters ==
=== Main ===
- David Boreanaz as Master Chief Special Warfare Operator^{[note A]} Jason Hayes a.k.a. Bravo 1/1B
- Max Thieriot as Special Warfare Operator Second Class Clay Spenser a.k.a. Bravo 6/6B
- Jessica Paré as Amanda "Mandy" Ellis
- Neil Brown Jr. as Senior Chief Special Warfare Operator Raymond "Ray" Perry, a.k.a. Bravo 2/2B
- A. J. Buckley as Special Warfare Operator First Class Sonny Quinn a.k.a. Bravo 3/3B
- Toni Trucks as Logistics Specialist First Class Lisa Davis

=== Recurring ===
- Judd Lormand as Lieutenant Commander Eric Blackburn
- Tyler Grey as Special Warfare Operator First Class Trent Sawyer a.k.a. Bravo 4/4B
- Justin Melnick as Special Warfare Operator First Class Brock Reynolds a.k.a. Bravo 5/5B
- Michaela McManus as Alana Hayes
- Kerri Medders as Emma Hayes
- Parisa Fakhri as Naima Perry
- Ammon Jacob Ford as Michael "Mikey" Hayes
- Alona Tal as Stella Baxter
- Michael Irby as Master Chief Special Warfare Operator Adam Siever
- Jay Hayden as Brian Armstrong
- Steve Howey as Danny Cooper
- Scott Foxx as Senior Chief Special Warfare Operator Scott "Full Metal" Carter a.k.a. Alpha 1/1A

=== Guest ===
- Daniel Gillies as Nate Massey
- Michael Rooker as Big Chief
- Sharif Atkins as Senior Chief Special Warfare Operator Beau Fuller
- C. Thomas Howell as Retired Senior Chief Special Warfare Operator Ash Spenser

Note:

^{[note A]}Enlisted SEALs have Special Warfare Operator specific ratings. See US Navy SEAL ratings.

== Episodes ==
| No. overall | No. in season | Title | Directed by | Written by | Original release date | Prod. code | U.S. viewers (millions) |
|---|---|---|---|---|---|---|---|
| 1 | 1 | "Tip of the Spear (Pilot)" | Christopher Chulack | Benjamin Cavell | September 27, 2017 | ST101 | 9.88 |
Senior Chief Jason Hayes is the leader of Bravo Team, an elite unit of Tier One Navy SEAL, who is coping with the recent loss of a member of his team, Nate, during a mission to destroy a load of stolen Javelin missiles aboard a cargo and subsequently to which they are attacked by enemy boats when exfiltrating. In the meantime, while also facing personal problems concerning his marriage and his family, he is sent with his teammates Ray Perry and Sonny Quinn on a clandestine mission in Monrovia to capture alive Abu Samir al-Masri, a high level ISIS leader responsible for multiple attacks in Iraq, hidden in a compound of a Liberian army general in order to arrange a meeting with exponents of Boko Haram. The overnight mission, in which the Green Team recruit Clay Spenser also participates, soon turns into a rescue operation for a female US aid worker held hostage there and Clay, despite contravening the orders received by Jason, is forced to kill the high value target as he was about to detonate himself with an explosive belt after a long chase in the basement.
| 2 | 2 | "Other Lives" | Christopher Chulack | Benjamin Cavell | October 4, 2017 | ST102 | 8.39 |
On a mission to northeastern Syria to prove the existence of a chemical weapons factory hidden in an abandoned hospital in al-Hawl, the team is in charge of taking samples and destroying the nerve gas dispersed but soon discovers life-threatening innocent civilians in need of rescue: therefore the second objective becomes, with the approval of Lieutenant Commander Eric Blackburn, to evacuate them as quickly as possible before ending up under heavy enemy fire close in on them. Meanwhile, at home, Ray's wife, who is pregnant, goes into labor unbeknownst to him while Clay, during the continuation of his training in the Green Team, hooks up a PhD student in literature named Stella in a bar.
| 3 | 3 | "Boarding Party" | Christopher Chulack | Spencer Hudnut | October 11, 2017 | ST103 | 8.02 |
The team must rescue US researchers being held hostage on the oceanographic ship Centaurus in the South China Sea near the Vietnamese coast but when pirates turn off GPS to head for southern Philippines, the two SEAL teams must carry out an overnight mission aboard against time before the hostages are sold in the port of Iligan. Clay's low ranking jeopardizes his future in the Green Team (also because his father, a former valorous SEAL, has written a book without permission and therefore has received a rebuke from the Navy) but he manages to establish a love affair with Stella. Meanwhile Jason, with Ray's help, starts to investigate a woman living in Norfolk and connected to his dead teammate's disposable phone, suspecting he was cheating on his wife.
| 4 | 4 | "Ghosts of Christmas Future" | Larry Teng | Benjamin Cavell & Daniele Nathanson | October 18, 2017 | ST104 | 7.11 |
Jason and the Bravo Team, involved in some deceptive CIA investigations, are in charge of capturing a former Serbian criminal war (responsible for the massacre of Muslim civilians in the Bosnian town of Travnik in 1994) and suspected arms dealer named Luka Baljic. Once in Tallinn, they are supposed to kidnap the target with a low profile operation before he meets a Chechen intermediary named Abukhan Kadyrov but Jason refuses to abort their mission after it goes sideways: after having simulated a false takeoff, they are then free to organize an alternative plan to successfully complete their task in the city traffic. Also, Clay's controversial father, Ash Spenser (C. Thomas Howell), comes to town on his book tour while Jason thinks he should lie to Alana discovering however from a photo that the woman was embedded in Afghanistan before Nate's death.
| 5 | 5 | "Collapse" | Ian Toynton | Becky Mode | October 25, 2017 | ST105 | 6.92 |
Jason and the SEAL team must navigate the contentious evacuation of an embassy in South Sudan when the country becomes increasingly unstable. Meanwhile, Clay and Stella take their relationship to the next level.
| 6 | 6 | "The Spinning Wheel" | Melanie Mayron | Joseph Sawyer & Julian Silver & Reiss Clausen-Wolf & Beth Schacter | November 8, 2017 | ST106 | 6.22 |
The team must work with Jason’s longtime rival to plan a raid, all under the watchful eye of top military brass. The raid is on a fortified underground complex used by a Yemeni “fixer” and is in Saudi Arabia, an American ally. The teams practise on a dummy complex but can’t complete the operation in the time limit. Eventually the mission is cancelled. Meanwhile, Clay tries to deliver solemn news to a teammate’s next of kin.
| 7 | 7 | "Borderlines" | Félix Alcalá | Corinne Marrinan | November 15, 2017 | ST107 | 7.24 |
Jason and the SEAL Team must rescue an undercover CIA operative after she is captured, in Brazil, by radical terrorists to be used as a bargaining chip. She is transported to Venezuela where the team have no jurisdiction and have to rely on local army units to extract her. Also, Clay faces the final harrowing exercise impeding his Tier One candidacy.
| 8 | 8 | "The Exchange" | John Dahl | Sabrina Almeida & Spencer Hudnut | November 22, 2017 | ST108 | 6.94 |
Jason and the SEAL Team have mixed feelings when they are tasked with overseeing the exchange of an American soldier who was captured after deserting for Gitmo detainees.
| 9 | 9 | "Rolling Dark" | Michael Watkins | Daniele Nathanson & Brian Horiuchi | December 6, 2017 | ST109 | 6.90 |
Jason and the SEAL team must rescue a Russian scientist and his wife and bring them across the Chinese border into Afghanistan as Chinese troops and Russian Special Forces close in intent on stopping them. The team have Cerebus the dog and set off to get in front of the Russians using the dog to take the shortest route. Also, Clay endures his first day with Team Bravo.
| 10 | 10 | "Pattern of Life" | Christopher Chulack | Corinne Marrinan | January 3, 2018 | ST110 | 5.86 |
Tensions are high when Jason and the SEAL Team enter a Yemeni house to locate a cell phone linked to a terrorist network and interrogate the family while the daughter lies in critical condition after being accidentally shot.
| 11 | 11 | "Containment" | Andy Wolk | Beth Schacter | January 10, 2018 | ST111 | 6.17 |
Jason and the SEAL team are sent to intercept the sale of nuclear waste intended for the manufacture of a dirty bomb, but the mission goes sideways when, instead, they find that the "waste" is actually nuclear weapons with unstable warheads that must make the treacherous journey back to base. Also, Ray suffers a shoulder injury and Jason and Alana are shocked by their kids' reactions when the topic of their reunion is broached.
| 12 | 12 | "The Upside Down" | J. Michael Muro | Spencer Hudnut & John Bellucci | January 17, 2018 | ST112 | 6.67 |
While on a mission to retrieve a downed USAF drone in the middle of the last Daesh-controlled zone in Iraq, the team disobeys orders so they can save Clay, who is trapped beneath a room full of armed terrorists. Also, Clay and Stella struggle with his imminent deployment, Jason and Alana keep footing around a reconciliation, and Lisa navigates her brand-new relationship with Danny Cooper.
| 13 | 13 | "Getaway Day" | Christopher Chulack | Benjamin Cavell & Ed Redlich & John Bellucci | January 31, 2018 | ST113 | 6.65 |
After Team Echo is killed in an ambush, Team Bravo's deployment is moved up and they must depart in 18 hours. Alana decides she and Jason should divorce since she can't share him with the team anymore, while Clay and Stella decide to forget his rushed marriage proposal and continue like before. Upon deployment in Jalalabad, they struggle to find a lead to avenge their fellow SEALs.
| 14 | 14 | "Call Out" | Christopher Chulack | Beth Schacter | February 28, 2018 | ST114 | 4.97 |
Bravo Team goes on a mission in a hostile neighborhood of Jalalabad to capture Tariq's lover Assim, narrowly escaping an ambush. Afterwards, they are sent to capture the builder of the bomb that killed Team Echo, but are forced to shoot him. Mandy finds out Tariq was blackmailed into betraying Echo for his relationship with Assim, who gives them a lead about a man in a red Mercedes that a journalist on base identifies as Afghan Police Province Commander Salim Hakan. Meanwhile, Jason struggles with Alana's decision to ask for a divorce.
| 15 | 15 | "No Man's Land" | Ian Toynton | John Bellucci & Corinne Marrinan | March 7, 2018 | ST115 | 6.07 |
After discovering Echo Team was killed because they burned a heroin farm, Bravo Team pays a visit to the farm and finds more than 10 million dollars hidden underground. According to the farmer, some men take money out of it regularly. They capture a 15-year-old boy who claims he just heard about the money and wanted some for his family. They follow him and discover he's really a girl, Dorri, that works as messenger for the Taliban to care for her younger brother. She helps them set up a trap, but their target is killed as a traitor. Mandy identifies the men as Al-Quaeda mercenaries and wonders who owns the farm. Dorri offers to keep helping them in exchange for passage to the USA. Meanwhile, Jason meets Amy, a private security specialist working on the base.
| 16 | 16 | "Never Get Out of the Boat" | J. Michael Muro | Spencer Hudnut & Mark Semos | March 21, 2018 | ST116 | 6.36 |
Team Bravo captures a chemist that tells them the farm owner is Ghani, one of the biggest drug traffickers in the world. They send Dorri alongside Clay and Ray for a visual confirmation of Ghani's bodyguard and follow him to Ghani, but the CIA puts the brakes on the mission because Ghani is a snitch for the DEA. Mandy uses reporter Paul Mulwray's contacts to get the mission back on track in exchange for an interview with Jason. They get their objective, though Sonny is wounded during the mission. During the celebration, Mandy reveals that Ghani sold the farm after the burning, in response to which Jason seeks out Amy for comfort.
| 17 | 17 | "In Name Only" | John Dahl | Brian Horiuchi & Sabrina Almeida | March 28, 2018 | ST117 | 6.48 |
Mandy asks for permission from her CIA bosses to pursue Salim Hakan. They learn that the burned farm was bought by KSR holdings, which is owned by Hakan's first wife, Permaz Hakan, who's been missing for years. They locate her father, who tells them that she ran to Masari, a human trafficker, to flee Hakan. They decide to go after Masari to hide the fact that they want Permaz, but the United States Department of Defense wants it to be a joint mission with the Afghan Special Forces. They attack Masari's compound, killing Masari and freeing the women and children. Hakan's mole on the Afghan team tries to run away with Permaz, but he's killed. Mandy convinces Permaz to talk to her, but it's not enough to green light the mission. Jason learns from reporter Paul Mulray that the economic interest in Afghanistan is mining. Mandy reunites with Salim to get him to talk, making it clear they know he's playing both sides. Hakan threatens her, but she has Bravo Team backing her up.
| 18 | 18 | "Credible Threat" | Ruben Garcia | Valerie Armstrong & Josef Sawyer | April 11, 2018 | ST118 | 6.24 |
Jason and the SEAL Team are tasked with protecting a delegation of congressmen and Department of Defense officials who come to Jalalabad for a publicity tour, even though a credible threat has been made against them. During their protection detail, the SEALs learn that Hakan is the intended assassination target and successfully kill the sniper responsible after the shooting. Meanwhile, Jason learns that Xeon Tactical Security CEO Alan Cutter may have had an economical motivation for killing Echo Team.
| 19 | 19 | "Takedown" | Holly Dale | Julian Silver & Reiss Clauson-Wolf & Beth Schacter | April 25, 2018 | ST119 | 6.26 |
While Mandy and the SEAL team search for leads on the sniper’s employers, Ray has to deal with the fallout of accidentally killing a child with a fragmentation grenade from when he was pursuing the sniper. Ray ultimately discloses his shoulder injury to the U.S. Army's Criminal Investigation Division. Mandy is later contacted by warlord Abad Halani for a face-to-face meeting.
| 20 | 20 | "Enemy of My Enemy" | Larry Teng | John Bellucci & Corinne Marrinan | May 2, 2018 | ST120 | 5.89 |
Mandy learns from Abad that his brother, Nouri, ordered the deaths of Echo Team and he provides details of Nouri’s whereabouts in order to facilitate an assassination mission. Shortly after an aborted Predator drone airstrike, the SEALs are forced to commit a raid at dawn and successfully capture Nouri. However, complications arise during extraction when a transport helicopter carrying Jason, Spenser, and Nouri is shot down by a surface-to-air missile.
| 21 | 21 | "The Graveyard of Empires" | David Boreanaz | Ed Redlich & Spencer Hudnut | May 9, 2018 | ST121 | 6.15 |
Jason’s group is forced to take shelter in a farmhouse while waiting for assistance from Ray’s team. During the chaos, Jason suffers from hallucinations caused by a concussion he sustained in the helicopter crash and comes to the conclusion that Abad was Cutter’s business partner.
| 22 | 22 | "The Cost of Doing Business" | Larry Teng | Benjamin Cavell | May 16, 2018 | ST122 | 6.14 |
Jason lies on his medical evaluation in order to pursue Nouri and later hears Ray's confession about his shoulder. During a night-time raid in the Pakistani mountains, the SEALs attempt to infiltrate a bunker stronghold during the middle of a firefight between Abad and Nouri's men, and learn that Abad had rigged the bunker to explode upon being breached. The SEALs use Nouri's men to detonate the trap in the following morning, and unsuccessfully attempt to capture Abad, killing him. Jason safeguards Xeon Security operative Amy Nelson by clearing her out of the base in order to avoid potential retaliation by Cutter. With the aid of Davis and Mandy, Jason finds a buried external harddrive hidden by Echo Team leader Steve Porter containing evidence of Xeon's mining operations. Shortly after confronting Cutter with his findings, Jason contemplates assassinating him, but Mandy begs him not to do it. Instead, Mandy gives the recovered evidence to Mulray, in exchange for him to drop his story on Ray’s accidental killing. Upon the team's return trip home, Mulray's report leads to Cutter being arrested by the FBI; Spenser reunites with Stella; Ray is reassigned to teach at the Navy SEAL school in order to medically recover; Davis visits a hospitalized Danny with Sonny; and Jason suffers from another hallucination while on a lunch outing with Mandy.

== Production ==
=== Development ===
Following the success of History Channel's Six, on January 27, 2017, it was announced that CBS had given the pilot order for another Navy SEAL project. The episode was written and authored by Benjamin Cavell who was expected to be an executive producer, alongside Ed Redlich, Sarah Timberman, Carl Beverly, Christopher Chulack. Production companies involved with the pilot include Chulack Productions, East 25 C, Timberman/Beverly Productions and CBS Television Studios. On May 12, 2017, CBS officially ordered the pilot to series. A few days later, it was announced that the series, now titled SEAL Team, would premiere by September 27, 2017, and air on Wednesdays at 9:00 P.M.

The series received a full-season order on October 12, 2017, bringing the first season to a total of 22 episodes.

=== Casting ===
On March 14, 2017, it was announced that Jim Caviezel would topline CBS' then-untitled Navy SEAL drama pilot but on March 22, 2017, it was announced that David Boreanaz had been cast in the pilot's lead role of Jason, replacing Caviezel; Boreanaz originally declined the series after finishing his 12-year run on Fox's Bones. However, he later changed his mind after Caviezel left due to creative differences. On March 8, 2017, it was reported that A. J. Buckley would play Sonny.

=== Filming ===
Filming for the pilot episode took place between March and April 2017 in New Orleans.

== Ratings ==
Viewership and ratings per episode of SEAL Team season 1
| No. | Title | Air date | Rating/share (18–49) | Viewers (millions) | DVR (18–49) | DVR viewers (millions) | Total (18–49) | Total viewers (millions) |
|---|---|---|---|---|---|---|---|---|
| 1 | "Tip of the Spear" | September 27, 2017 | 1.5/6 | 9.88 | 1.0 | 4.37 | 2.5 | 14.25 |
| 2 | "Other Lives" | October 4, 2017 | 1.2/5 | 8.39 | 0.8 | 3.53 | 2.0 | 11.92 |
| 3 | "Boarding Party" | October 11, 2017 | 1.2/5 | 8.02 | 0.8 | 3.36 | 2.0 | 11.38 |
| 4 | "Ghosts of Christmas Future" | October 18, 2017 | 1.1/4 | 7.11 | 0.7 | 3.50 | 1.8 | 10.62 |
| 5 | "Collapse" | October 25, 2017 | 1.0/4 | 6.92 | 0.7 | 3.23 | 1.7 | 10.15 |
| 6 | "The Spinning Wheel" | November 8, 2017 | 0.9/3 | 6.22 | 0.7 | 3.24 | 1.6 | 9.46 |
| 7 | "Borderlines" | November 15, 2017 | 1.1/4 | 7.24 | 0.8 | 3.32 | 1.9 | 10.56 |
| 8 | "The Exchange" | November 22, 2017 | 1.1/4 | 6.94 | 0.7 | 3.25 | 1.8 | 10.20 |
| 9 | "Rolling Dark" | December 6, 2017 | 1.1/4 | 6.90 | 0.7 | 3.05 | 1.8 | 9.95 |
| 10 | "Pattern of Life" | January 3, 2018 | 0.9/3 | 5.86 | —N/a | —N/a | —N/a | —N/a |
| 11 | "Containment" | January 10, 2018 | 0.9/3 | 6.17 | 0.9 | 3.91 | 1.8 | 10.08 |
| 12 | "The Upside Down" | January 17, 2018 | 1.1/4 | 6.67 | 0.8 | 3.58 | 1.9 | 10.25 |
| 13 | "Getaway Day" | January 31, 2018 | 1.0/4 | 6.65 | 0.8 | 3.41 | 1.8 | 10.06 |
| 14 | "Call Out" | February 28, 2018 | 0.8/3 | 4.97 | 0.9 | 4.19 | 1.7 | 9.16 |
| 15 | "No Man's Land" | March 7, 2018 | 0.9/3 | 6.07 | 0.8 | 3.68 | 1.7 | 9.77 |
| 16 | "Never Get Out of the Boat" | March 21, 2018 | 1.0/4 | 6.36 | 0.8 | 3.67 | 1.8 | 10.03 |
| 17 | "In Name Only" | March 28, 2018 | 0.9/4 | 6.48 | 0.8 | 3.21 | 1.7 | 9.61 |
| 18 | "Credible Threat" | April 11, 2018 | 1.0/4 | 6.24 | 0.7 | 3.50 | 1.7 | 9.74 |
| 19 | "Takedown" | April 25, 2018 | 0.8/3 | 6.26 | 0.7 | 3.31 | 1.5 | 9.57 |
| 20 | "Enemy of My Enemy" | May 2, 2018 | 0.9/4 | 5.89 | 0.6 | 2.91 | 1.5 | 8.80 |
| 21 | "The Graveyard of Empires" | May 9, 2018 | 0.9/4 | 6.15 | 0.6 | 2.86 | 1.5 | 9.02 |
| 22 | "The Cost of Doing Business" | May 16, 2018 | 0.9/4 | 6.14 | 0.6 | 3.08 | 1.5 | 9.22 |

== Home media ==
SEAL Team: Season One
| Set details | Special features | |
| 6 disc; 22 episodes; Box set, Color, NTSC, Subtitled, Widescreen; 15 hours and 39 minutes | | |
DVD release dates
| Region 1 | Region 2 | Region 4 |
| August 14, 2018 | October 15, 2018 | November 21, 2018 |
