= SEAL Team season 5 =

SEAL Team
- Season 5
- Starring: David Boreanaz; Max Thieriot; Neil Brown Jr.; A. J. Buckley; Toni Trucks
- No. of episodes: 14

Release
- Original network: CBS (episodes 1–4); Paramount+ (episodes 5–14)
- Original release: October 10, 2021 – January 23, 2022

Season chronology
- ← Previous; Season 4 Next → Season 6

The fifth season of the American military drama television series SEAL Team premiered on October 10, 2021, on CBS, for the 2021–22 television season for four episodes. Afterwards, the rest of the season moved to Paramount+. The season concluded on January 23, 2022.

SEAL Team follows an elite unit of United States Navy SEALs portrayed by David Boreanaz, Max Thieriot, Neil Brown Jr., A. J. Buckley, and Toni Trucks.

Despite airing only the first four episodes on CBS, the fifth season of SEAL Team ranked #42 with a total of 5.83 million viewers. The season was also the most-watched on Paramount+.

== Cast and characters ==
=== Main ===
- David Boreanaz as Master Chief Special Warfare Operator^{[note A]} Jason Hayes a.k.a. Bravo 1/1B
- Max Thieriot as Special Warfare Operator Second Class Clay Spenser a.k.a. Bravo 6/6B
- Neil Brown Jr. as Chief Warrant Officer 2 Raymond "Ray" Perry a.k.a. Bravo 2/2B
- A. J. Buckley as Special Warfare Operator First Class Sonny Quinn a.k.a. Bravo 3/3B
- Toni Trucks as Lieutenant (junior grade) Lisa Davis

=== Recurring ===
- Tyler Grey as Special Warfare Operator First Class Trent Sawyer a.k.a. Bravo 4/4B
- Justin Melnick as Special Warfare Operator First Class Brock Reynolds a.k.a. Bravo 5/5B
- Alona Tal as Stella Baxter
- Kerri Medders as Emma Hayes
- Parisa Fakhri as Naima Perry
- C. Thomas Howell as Ash Spenser
- Maximiliano Hernández as Carl Dryden
- Mike Wade as Wes Soto
- Rachel Boston as Hannah Oliver

=== Guest ===
- Judd Lormand as Commander Eric Blackburn
- Shawn Hatosy as Marc Lee

Note:

^{[note A]}Enlisted SEALs have Special Warfare Operator specific ratings. See US Navy SEAL ratings.

== Episodes ==
The number in the "No. overall" column refers to the episode's number within the overall series, whereas the number in the "No. in season" column refers to the episode's number within this particular season. "Production code" refers to the order in which the episodes were produced while "U.S. viewers (millions)" refers to the number of viewers in the U.S. in millions who watched the episode as it was aired.

No. overall	No. in season	Title	Directed by	Written by	Original air/release date	Prod. code	U.S. viewers (millions)
CBS
81	1	"Trust, But Verify: Part 1"	Christopher Chulack	Spencer Hudnut	October 10, 2021	ST501	3.73
82	2	"Trust, But Verify: Part 2"	Christopher Chulack	Tom Mularz & Mark H. Semos	October 17, 2021	ST502	3.37
83	3	"Nine Ten"	Jessica Paré	Dana Greenblatt	October 24, 2021	ST503	3.58
84	4	"Need to Know"	Tyler Grey	Tom Mularz & Mark H. Semos	October 31, 2021	ST504	3.19
Paramount+
85	5	"Frog on the Tracks"	J. Michael Muro	Spencer Hudnut & Kenny Sheard	November 1, 2021	ST505	N/A
86	6	"Man on Fire"	J. Michael Muro	Kinan Copen	November 7, 2021	ST506	N/A
87	7	"What's Past Is Prologue"	Allison Liddi-Brown	Dana Greenblatt & Rashaan Dozier-Escalante	November 14, 2021	ST507	N/A
88	8	"Conspicuous Gallantry"	David Boreanaz	Teresa Huang & Stephen Gasper	November 21, 2021	ST508	N/A
89	9	"Close to Home"	Gonzalo Amat	Tom Mularz & Ariel Endacott	November 28, 2021	ST509	N/A
90	10	"Head On"	Ruben Garcia	Kinan Copen & Rashaan Dozier-Escalante	December 5, 2021	ST510	N/A
91	11	"Violence of Action"	Ruben Garcia	Tom Mularz & Teresa Huang	January 2, 2022	ST511	N/A
92	12	"Keys to Heaven"	Loren Yaconelli	Dana Greenblatt & Kenny Sheard	January 9, 2022	ST512	N/A
93	13	"Pillar of Strength"	David Boreanaz	Mark H. Semos & Stephen Gasper	January 16, 2022	ST513	N/A
94	14	"All Bravo Stations"	Christopher Chulack	Spencer Hudnut	January 23, 2022	ST514	N/A

== Production ==
On May 14, 2021, it was reported the series was undergoing talks to move to the streaming service Paramount+ if renewed for a fifth season; if a deal were reached, the series would air some of its fifth season episodes on CBS before moving to Paramount+. Four days later, the deal was finalized.

== Release ==
On May 19, 2021, it was announced that the series would air the first four episodes on Sundays in the 10:00 PM ET timeslot after NCIS: Los Angeles. On July 12, 2021, it was revealed that the season would premiere on October 10, 2021. Afterwards, the later ten episodes would stream on Paramount+.

On November 1, following its fourth and final CBS episode, the series made its debut on Paramount+, releasing its fifth episode.

== Reception ==
=== CBS ratings ===
Viewership and ratings per episode of SEAL Team season 5
No.	Title	Air date	Rating (18–49)	Viewers (millions)	DVR (18–49)	DVR viewers (millions)	Total (18–49)	Total viewers (millions)
1	"Trust, But Verify: Part 1"	October 10, 2021	0.4	3.73	0.3	1.84	0.7	5.57 (Note: Live+7 ratings were unavailable, so Live+3 ratings have been used instead.)
2	"Trust, But Verify: Part 2"	October 17, 2021	0.4	3.37	0.3	1.84	0.7	5.21
3	"Nine Ten"	October 24, 2021	0.4	3.58	0.3	2.30	0.7	5.89
4	"Need to Know"	October 31, 2021	0.3	3.19	0.3	1.79	0.6	4.99
