= SEAL Team season 6 =

SEAL Team
- Season 6
- Starring: David Boreanaz; Max Thieriot; Neil Brown Jr.; A. J. Buckley; Toni Trucks; Raffi Barsoumian
- No. of episodes: 10

Release
- Original network: Paramount+
- Original release: September 18 – November 20, 2022

Season chronology
- ← Previous; Season 5 Next → Season 7

The sixth season of the American military drama television series SEAL Team started streaming on Paramount+ on September 18, 2022 until November 20. The season featured 10 episodes and the series' 100th episode. The season also marked the last to feature Max Thieriot as a main cast member; Thieriot left the series to fulfill his commitment to his own series Fire Country.

== Cast and characters ==
=== Main ===
- David Boreanaz as Master Chief Special Warfare Operator^{[note A]} Jason Hayes a.k.a. Bravo 1/1B
- Max Thieriot as Special Warfare Operator Second Class Clay Spenser a.k.a. Bravo 6/6B (episodes 1-8)
- Neil Brown Jr. as Chief Warrant Officer 2 Raymond "Ray" Perry, formerly Senior Chief Special Warfare Operator a.k.a. Bravo 2/2B
- A. J. Buckley as Special Warfare Operator First Class Percival "Sonny" Quinn a.k.a. Bravo 3/3B
- Toni Trucks as Lieutenant (junior grade) Lisa Davis
- Raffi Barsoumian as Senior Chief Special Warfare Operator Omar Hamza.

=== Recurring ===
- Tyler Grey as Special Warfare Operator First Class Trent Sawyer a.k.a. Bravo 4/4B
- Justin Melnick as Special Warfare Operator First Class Brock Reynolds a.k.a. Bravo 5/5B
- Alona Tal as Stella Baxter
- Parisa Fakhri as Naima Perry
- C. Thomas Howell as Ash Spenser
- Mike Wade as Wes Soto
- Judd Lormand as Commander Eric Blackburn
- Jessica Paré as Amanda "Mandy" Ellis
- Noor Razooky as Yezda

Note:

^{[note A]}Enlisted SEALs have Special Warfare Operator specific ratings. See US Navy SEAL ratings.

== Episodes ==
No. overall	No. in season	Title	Directed by	Written by	Original release date	Prod. code
95	1	"Low-Impact"	Christopher Chulack	Spencer Hudnut & Mark H. Semos	September 18, 2022	ST601
96	2	"Crawl, Walk, Run"	Jessica Paré	Dana Greenblatt & Leanne Koch	September 25, 2022	ST602
97	3	"Growing Pains"	Cherie Nowlan	Tom Mularz & Madalyn Lawson	October 2, 2022	ST603
98	4	"Phantom Pattern"	David Boreanaz	Kenny Sheard & Ariel Endacott	October 9, 2022	ST604
99	5	"Thunderstruck"	Ruben Garcia	Tom Mularz & Brian Beneker	October 16, 2022	ST605
100	6	"Watch Your 6"	Gonzalo Amat	Dana Greenblatt & Stephen Gasper	October 23, 2022	ST606
101	7	"Strange Bedfellows"	Ruben Garcia	Kinan Copen	October 30, 2022	ST607
102	8	"Aces and Eights"	Jason Cabell	Tom Mularz & Kenny Sheard	November 6, 2022	ST608
Note: This episode marks the final appearance of Max Thieriot (Clay Spenser).
103	9	"Damage Assessment"	Christopher Chulack	Spencer Hudnut & Mark H. Semos	November 13, 2022	ST609
104	10	"Fair Winds and Following Seas"	Christopher Chulack	Spencer Hudnut & Dana Greenblatt	November 20, 2022	ST610

== Production ==
On February 1, 2022, Paramount+ renewed the series for a sixth season which premiered on September 18, 2022.

On June 23, 2022, Raffi Barsoumian was cast as Omar Hamza while Max Thieriot as Clay Spencer departed near the end of the season.
