= SEAL Team season 7 =

Season of television series

SEAL Team
- Season 7
- Starring: David Boreanaz; Neil Brown Jr.; A. J. Buckley; Toni Trucks; Raffi Barsoumian; Beau Knapp; Dylan Walsh
- No. of episodes: 10

Release
- Original network: Paramount+
- Original release: August 11 – October 6, 2024

Season chronology
- ← Previous; Season 6

The seventh and final season of the American military drama television series SEAL Team premiered on Paramount+ on August 11, 2024. The series follows Bravo Team, an elite unit of United States Navy SEALs. The cast features David Boreanaz, Neil Brown Jr., A. J. Buckley, Toni Trucks, Raffi Barsoumian, Beau Knapp, and Dylan Walsh.

The season was affected by both the 2023 Writers Guild of America strike and 2023 SAG-AFTRA strike.

== Cast and characters ==
=== Main ===
- David Boreanaz as Master Chief Special Warfare Operator Jason Hayes a.k.a. Bravo 1/1B.
- Neil Brown Jr. as Chief Warrant Officer 2 Raymond "Ray" Perry, a.k.a. Mako 1/MK-1.
- A. J. Buckley as Special Warfare Operator First Class Percival "Sonny" Quinn a.k.a. Bravo 3/3B.
- Toni Trucks as Lieutenant Lisa Davis.
- Raffi Barsoumian as Senior Chief Special Warfare Operator Omar Hamza a.k.a. Bravo 2/2B.
- Beau Knapp as Special Warfare Operator First Class Laurance A. "Drew" Franklin IV a.k.a. Bravo 6/6B.
- Dylan Walsh as Captain Walch, the new Commanding Officer of DEVGRU.

=== Recurring ===
- Tyler Grey as Special Warfare Operator First Class Trent Sawyer a.k.a. Bravo 4/4B.
- Justin Melnick as Special Warfare Operator First Class Brock Reynolds a.k.a. Bravo 5/5B.
- Judd Lormand as Commander Eric Blackburn, Executive Officer of DEVGRU.
- Jessica Paré as Mandy Ellis
- Alona Tal as Stella Spenser.
- Parisa Fakhri as Naima Perry.

== Episodes ==
No. overall	No. in season	Title	Directed by	Written by	Original release date	Prod. code
105	1	"Chaos in the Calm, Part 1"	Christopher Chulack	Spencer Hudnut & Dana Greenblatt	August 11, 2024	ST701
106	2	"Chaos in the Calm, Part 2"	Christopher Chulack	Mark H. Semos & Kinan Copen	August 11, 2024	ST702
107	3	"Ships in the Night"	S. J. Main Muñoz	Tom Mularz & Stephen Gasper	August 18, 2024	ST703
108	4	"Heroes and Criminals"	Mark H. Semos	Ariel Endacott & Madalyn Lawson	August 25, 2024	ST704
109	5	"A Perfect Storm"	Jessica Paré	Dana Greenblatt & Leanne Koch	September 1, 2024	ST705
110	6	"Hundred-Year Marathon"	David Boreanaz	Tyler Grey & Maggie Stabile	September 8, 2024	ST706
111	7	"Mission Creep"	Lionel Coleman	Tom Mularz	September 15, 2024	ST707
112	8	"Appetite for Destruction"	Ruben Garcia	Dana Greenblatt & Brian Beneker	September 22, 2024	ST708
113	9	"The Seas and the Hills"	Ruben Garcia	Peter Rudolph & Mac Bundick, Jr.	September 29, 2024	ST709
114	10	"The Last Word"	Christopher Chulack	Spencer Hudnut	October 6, 2024	ST710

== Production ==
=== Development ===
On January 18, 2023, Paramount+ renewed the series for a seventh season. On November 15, 2023, it was announced that the seventh season would be the series' last.

On March 14, 2024, David Boreanaz revealed the series finale titled as "The Last Word". The episode was written by Spencer Hudnut and directed by Christopher Chulack.

=== Casting ===
On December 12, 2023, Beau Knapp was cast as a series regular for the seventh and final season. On December 15, Dylan Walsh was cast as Captain Walch, a recently appointed commanding officer of DEVGRU, who is by-the-book, but also has aspirations for politics.

== Release ==
The seventh and final season premiered on August 11, 2024.
