= That Friend =

- Directed by: Alex Wall; Will Sterling
- Written by: Alex Wall; Will Sterling
- Produced by: Ryan Tillotson
- Starring: Harvey Guillén; Billie Lourd; Josh Brener; Neil Brown Jr.; Miles Gutierrez-Riley
- Cinematography: Michael Amico
- Edited by: Josh Land
- Music by: Dillon Baldassero
- Production company: Straw Hut Media
- Release date: June 8, 2026 (Tribeca Festival)
- Running time: 87 minutes
- Country: United States
- Language: English

That Friend is a 2026 American comedy film written and directed by Alex Wall and Will Sterling. It stars Harvey Guillén, Billie Lourd, Josh Brener, Neil Brown Jr., and Miles Gutierrez-Riley.

The film premiered at the Tribeca Festival on June 8, 2026.

== Premise ==
A trip to Palm Springs, meant to be refreshing for Henry and his girlfriend Penny, escalates to cackling shenanigans when his bombastic friend Paul tags along. Armed with laced cigarettes and a passion for taking things too far, Paul tests the bonds of everyone involved.

== Cast ==
- Harvey Guillén as Paul
- Billie Lourd as Penny
- Josh Brener as Henry
- Neil Brown Jr. as Bill
- Miles Gutierrez-Riley as Spencer
- Lauren Lapkus
- Mary Holland
- Jim Hoffmaster as Fredrick
- Rose Abdoo as Maryann
- Will Sterling as Kevin

== Production ==
In July 2024, it was reported that Alex Wall and Will Sterling would be writing and directing a comedy film, starring Harvey Guillén, Billie Lourd, Josh Brener, Neil Brown Jr., and Miles Gutierrez-Riley. In April 2026, the first film was selected to screen at the Tribeca Festival.

== Release ==
That Friend premiered at the Tribeca Festival on June 8, 2026.
