= The Pacifier =

2005 film by Adam Shankman

- Theatrical release poster
- Directed by: Adam Shankman
- Written by: Thomas Lennon; Robert Ben Garant
- Produced by: Roger Birnbaum; Gary Barber; Jonathan Glickman
- Starring: Vin Diesel; Lauren Graham; Faith Ford; Brittany Snow; Max Thieriot; Carol Kane; Brad Garrett
- Cinematography: Peter James
- Edited by: Christopher Greenbury
- Music by: John Debney
- Production companies: Walt Disney Pictures; Spyglass Entertainment
- Distributed by: Buena Vista Pictures Distribution
- Release date: March 4, 2005
- Running time: 95 minutes
- Country: United States
- Language: English
- Budget: $56 million
- Box office: $198.6 million

The Pacifier is a 2005 American family action comedy film directed by Adam Shankman, written by Thomas Lennon and Robert Ben Garant and starring Vin Diesel. After a failed rescue mission, Navy SEAL Shane Wolfe (Diesel) is assigned as babysitter to the dead man's family.

The film was released on March 4, 2005 by Buena Vista Pictures Distribution. It received generally negative reviews from critics. It grossed $113 million in the United States and a total of $198.6 million worldwide against a budget of $56 million.

== Plot ==
U.S. Navy SEAL lieutenant Shane Wolfe is assigned to rescue Howard Plummer, a man working on a top-secret government project, from a group of Serbian rebels. Shane and his team successfully get Howard off an enemy boat. Boarding the helicopter to escape, the team gets attacked again and Howard gets killed. Shane spends two months in the hospital recovering from gunshot wounds to the chest during the attack.

At the United States Naval Academy in Annapolis, Maryland, Shane's commanding officer, Captain Bill Fawcett, explains that he has been assigned to escort Howard's widow, Julie, to Zürich, to retrieve the contents of Howard's safety deposit box. Meanwhile, Shane has been assigned to stay at the Plummer residence in Bethesda, to search for the secret project called GHOST and mind the family's five children: Zoe, Seth, Lulu, Peter, and baby Tyler. The kids prove to be difficult to handle, even with the help of their nanny Helga, who quits when one of Zoe and Seth's pranks intended for Shane goes wrong, with Helga suffering the prank instead. Shane eventually begins to discover the children's problems and resolve them, gaining their trust after saving them from a pair of intruders looking for the GHOST program.

Later, the school's vice principal, Duane Murney, informs Shane that Seth has cut and bleached his hair, has a Nazi armband in his locker, and has skipped a month of wrestling practices. At home, Seth tells Shane he only joined the wrestling team because of his father. After Seth sneaks out of the house, Shane follows and learns that Seth has secretly joined an amateur production of The Sound of Music, playing the role of Rolf. The director quits, and Shane takes charge of the show, takes care of the house, gives Zoe driving lessons, and teaches Lulu and her fellow Firefly Scouts martial arts to defend themselves against rival scouts.

As Seth quits the wrestling team, Shane challenges Murney to a wrestling match in front of the entire school, which he easily wins despite Murney's show of bluster. The Firefly Girl Scouts use the fighting skills that Shane taught them to fight and tie up the rival Boy Scouts. Zoe and Shane share stories of their fathers, both of whom had died in similar circumstances, and both hug. They are interrupted by a phone call from Julie, who has figured out the password "My Angel," retrieved a two-prong key from the box, and is on her way home. The kids immediately plan a "Welcome Home" party for their mother.

That evening, Shane discovers a secret vault underneath the garage, which requires the key Julie just acquired. When Fawcett and Julie arrive home, he and Shane go to the garage, where Shane says he is rethinking his career. The two intruders from the other day arrive and pull off their masks, revealing themselves as the Chuns, the Plummers’ Korean next-door neighbors. Suddenly, Fawcett overpowers Shane and knocks him out, revealing himself to be a double agent working with the Chuns. After Fawcett ties up and gags the children, Mr. Chun holds them hostage in the playroom while Fawcett and Mrs. Chun take Julie down to the vault. They open the door, but a dangerous security system prevents them from proceeding, with one of the traps burning off Mrs. Chun's eyebrows.

The children escape, take down Mr. Chun, and wake Shane, who sends them to get help while he goes to the vault to help Julie. Mr. Chun follows them in Fawcett's car. With Zoe at the wheel, the kids force him to crash into a car dealership. Shane gets past the security system using the dance Howard had used to lull Peter to sleep each night. Julie knocks out Mrs. Chun, and Shane's voice activates the final vault, opening the door which knocks Fawcett unconscious. By then, the children have lured a large crowd of the Police to the house. Mr. Chun arrives and holds all of them at gunpoint. Shane notices the school principal and his love interest Claire Fletcher right behind him, having followed the chase upon seeing it pass the school. Shane distracts Mr. Chun with the help of the family pet duck Gary, and Claire subdues him.

Fawcett and the Chuns are arrested, and Shane and the Plummers say their goodbyes. At Seth's performance, it is revealed that Shane has retired from the Navy and joined the school staff as the new wrestling coach. Murney, dressed as a nun, also performs in the play, singing "Climb Ev'ry Mountain" off-key, and Claire and Shane kiss backstage.

== Cast ==
- Vin Diesel as Shane Wolfe, a Navy SEAL.
- Lauren Graham as Principal Claire Fletcher, former Navy petty officer and the principal of the Plummer children's school.
- Faith Ford as Julie Plummer, the children's mother.
- Brittany Snow as Zoe Plummer, the eldest of the children; she is sixteen years old and a typical teenage cheerleader girl. She is a tenth grader in high school.
- Max Thieriot as Seth Plummer, the second oldest child. He is fourteen years old and is a sullen teenage boy. He is an eighth grader in middle school.
- Chris Potter as Captain Bill Fawcett, Shane's commanding officer.
- Morgan York as Lulu Plummer, the middle child and is ten years old. She is a fourth grader in elementary school.
- Scott Thompson as the director of a local drama production.
- Carol Kane as Helga Popescu, the children's Romanian nanny.
- Brad Garrett as Vice Principal Dwayne Murney, the school's vice-principal and former wrestling coach.
- Keegan and Logan Hoover as Peter Plummer, the second youngest; he is two years old and can only go to sleep when someone sings the "Peter Panda" song. He is in preschool.
- Bo and Luke Vink as Baby Tyler Plummer, the youngest; a seven-month-old infant.
- Tate Donovan as Howard Plummer, a professor who developed "GHOST", Julie's husband and father of the children. He is killed at the beginning of the film.
- Denis Akiyama and Mung-Ling Tsui as Mr. and Mrs. Chun, the Plummers' next-door neighbors.

== Production ==
In October 2003, Spyglass Entertainment announced family comedy The Pacifier was slated to begin production in early 2004. The following month, it was announced the film would be co-produced and distributed by Walt Disney Pictures with Vin Diesel to star. In January 2004, Adam Shankman joined the film as director after Four Christmases, another Spyglass film to which Shankman was attached, was delayed upon Columbia Pictures realizing it was not prudent to have two holiday themed films in production simultaneously as they had already committed to the Tim Allen vehicle Skipping Christmas.

== Soundtrack ==
No.	Title	Writer(s)	Original artist(s)	Length
1.	"Everyday Superhero"	Steve Harwell, Matthew Gerrard, Robbie Nevil	Smash Mouth	3:28
2.	"Saturday Night"	Ozomatli, J. Smith-Freeman	Ozomatli	3:59
3.	"We Will Rock You"	Brian May	Queen	2:01
4.	"The Anthem"	Benji Madden, Joel Madden, John Feldman	Good Charlotte	2:55
5.	"Skip to My Lou"	Traditional	Larry Groce and Disneyland Children's Sing-Along Chorus	1:21
6.	"The Power"	Benito Benites, John "Virgo" Garrett III, Toni C.	Snap!	3:47
7.	"Sixteen Going on Seventeen" (The Sound of Music)	Rodgers and Hammerstein	Daniel Truhitte, Charmian Carr	2:10
8.	"Climb Ev'ry Mountain" (The Sound of Music)	Rodgers and Hammerstein	Shirley Bassey	2:16
9.	"The Good, the Bad and the Ugly" (Instrumental theme song of the movie with the same name)	Ennio Morricone	Bruno Nicolai & Unione Musicisti di Roma	2:45
Total length:				24:42

== Reception ==
=== Box office ===
Entertainment Weekly predicted that the film would earn about $17 million and come in second behind John Travolta's Be Cool. It opened at #1 in the box office upon its opening weekend with $30.6 million. By the end of its run, it earned $198.6 million worldwide.

=== Critical response ===
On Rotten Tomatoes, the film has a 21% approval rating based on 127 reviews and an average rating of 3.90/10. The site's critical consensus reads, "Vin Diesel parodies his tough guy image for the family audience, but the result is only moderately amusing." On Metacritic, the film has a weighted average score of 30 out of 100 based on 27 reviews, indicating "generally unfavorable reviews". Audiences polled by CinemaScore gave the film an average grade of "A−" on an A+ to F scale.

Roger Ebert gave the film two stars out of four, writing, "This premise is promising, but somehow the movie never really takes off." Todd McCarthy of Variety wrote: "If [audiences] swallow this odoriferous exercise in calculated career repositioning, they'll swallow anything."

== Possible sequel ==
In December 2015, Vin Diesel said that a sequel was being written. Neither the official announcement nor the film’s cancellation has been confirmed.
