= Connor Trinneer =

American actor (born 1969)

- Trinneer at Dragon Con in 2026
- Born: March 19, 1969 (age 57); Walla Walla, Washington, U.S.
- Education: Pacific Lutheran University (BFA); University of Missouri–Kansas City (MFA)
- Years active: 1996–present
- Spouses: Ariana Navarre (m. 2004; div. 2022) Jackie Robbins Smith (m. 2024)
- Children: 1

Connor Wyatt Trinneer (born March 19, 1969) is an American film, stage, and television actor. He is best known for his roles as Charles "Trip" Tucker III on Star Trek: Enterprise, Michael on the series Stargate Atlantis, and Professor Moynihan on the web series Guilty Party.

== Early life ==
Trinneer was born on March 19, 1969, in Walla Walla, Washington, but spent many years in Kelso, Washington, where he attended elementary and middle schools, and then Kelso High School. He attended Pacific Lutheran University in Parkland where he played college football. He graduated with a Bachelor of Fine Arts degree in acting, then obtained a Master of Fine Arts degree from University of Missouri-Kansas City.

== Career ==
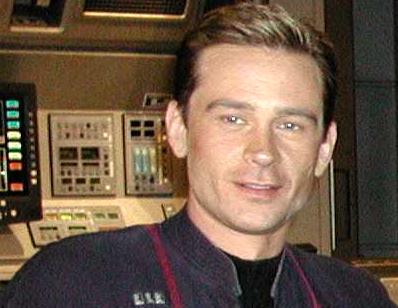
Trinneer, as Commander Charles "Trip" Tucker III, February 2002

Trinneer first came to attention in Arcadia at the Huntington Theater Company in Boston. Much of his work has been in theater, specifically a long association with the Circle X Theatre Company in Hollywood.

He has had several guest-starring roles on television, including One Life to Live, Sliders, and Touched by an Angel. He also had a significant role in the TV adaptation of A.R. Gurney's Far East, playing the conflicted gay officer Bob Munger.

In 2001, Trinneer auditioned for Star Trek: Enterprise. At the time, he did not follow science fiction and was unaware of the franchise's significance. He said that he gained the role of Tucker through sheer luck, as he anticipated that more than a hundred actors would audition for the part. During the audition, he had only seven script pages on which to base his performance, and was told only that the character originated from the southern United States.

Trinneer starred as Tucker in all 98 episodes of Enterprise across its four seasons and was nominated twice for the Saturn Award for Best Supporting Actor in 2002 and 2003 for his performance.

After the cancellation of Enterprise in 2005, Trinneer returned to guest-star roles on series such as Terminator: The Sarah Connor Chronicles, 24 and a recurring role as the Wraith Michael in Stargate Atlantis.

Trinneer attended the GO3 Electronic and Entertainment Expo in Perth, Western Australia, and appeared with fellow Stargate Atlantis co-star David Nykl on the 2009 Channel Seven Perth Telethon.

From 2022 to 2024, he was the co-host of the podcast The Shuttlepod Show with his Enterprise co-star Dominic Keating. In April 2024, after leaving The Shuttlepod Show, Keating and Trinneer announced their new podcast The D-Con Chamber. In 2023 Trinneer reprised the role of Trip Tucker in Holograms, All the Way Down an episode of the animated web series Star Trek: Very Short Treks made to celebrate the franchise's 50th anniversary.

== Personal life ==
Trinneer married Ariana Navarre on May 29, 2004; they have a child. In 2022, during the broadcast of the webcast "The Shuttlepod Show", Trinneer revealed he had divorced his wife in the same year. On November 9, 2024, Trinneer married realtor Jackie Robbins Smith.

== Filmography ==
=== Film ===
Year	Title	Role	Notes
2001	61*	Writer No. 2	Television film
2009	Star Runners	Tycho 'Ty' Johns	Television film
2015	Prey for Death	Chamberlain	
2017	Unbelievable!!!!!	Captain Jack Youngblood	
2017	American Made	George W. Bush	
2018	Stargate Origins: Catherine	Professor Paul Langford	
2021	The Baby Pact	Kevin Pyle	
2022	The Fabelmans	Phil Newhart	

=== Television ===
Year	Title	Role	Notes
1996	One Life to Live	Zeus Zelenko No. 2	Unknown episodes
1998	Sliders	Samson	Episode: "Prophets and Loss"
1998	Touched by an Angel	Paul Ratcliff	Episode: "Seek and Ye Shall Find"
2000	Freaky Links	Ted	Episode: "Subject: Three Thirteen"
2001	Gideon's Crossing	Steve Tedesco	Episode: "The Way"
2001–2005	Star Trek: Enterprise	Commander Charles Tucker III	98 episodes Nominated—Saturn Award for Best Supporting Actor on Television (2002–03)
2005	Numbers	Bob McHugh	Episode: "Toxin"
2006	Close to Home	Eric Foster	Episode: "Privilege"
2006–2008	Stargate Atlantis	Michael Kenmore	10 episodes
2006	NCIS	James Dempsey	Episode: "Jeopardy"
2006	Without a Trace	Coach Robert Owens	Episode: "Fade Away"
2007	Family Guy	Sharon Stone's Boyfriend	Episode: "Road to Rupert"
2008	Criminal Minds	Dan Torre	Episode: "Minimal Loss"
2009	Terminator: The Sarah Connor Chronicles	Sheriff Alvan McKinley	Episode: "The Good Wound"
2009	24	Carl Gadsen	Episode: "Day 7: 10:00pm–11:00pm"
2009	The Closer	Jeff Webb	Episode: "Waivers of Extradition"
2009	Lincoln Heights	Detective Kersey	2 episodes
2010	The Mentalist	Deputy Bob Woolgar	Episode: "Red Moon"
2011	Pretty Little Liars	Nick McMullers	Episode: "The New Normal"
2011	NCIS: Los Angeles	NCIS Agent Boyle	Episode: "Empty Quiver"
2012	Suits	Preston Reed	Episode: "Asterisk"
2015	American Odyssey	Michael Banks	3 episodes
2017	Riley Parra	Samael	Web series
2018	Stargate Origins	Professor Paul Langford	Web series
2018	Guilty Party	Professor Michael Moynihan	Web series
2018–2021	9-1-1	Jessie	5 episodes
2019	The Purge	Curtis	3 episodes, season 2
2020	The Resident	Mark Lawson	Episode: “Reverse Cinderella”

=== Video games ===
Year	Title	Role	Notes
2016	ReCore	Dr. Thomas Adams	

=== Web series ===
Year	Title	Role	Notes
2023	Star Trek: Very Short Treks	Charles Tucker (voice)	Episode: "Hologram All the Way Down"
