= Star Runners =

- Genre: Action; Adventure; Sci-Fi
- Written by: Rafael Jordan
- Directed by: Mat King
- Starring: Connor Trinneer; James Kyson Lee; Toni Trucks; Aja Evans; Michael Culkin
- Country of origin: United States
- Original language: English

Production
- Producers: Jeffery Beach; Phillip Roth
- Running time: 88 minutes
- Production company: Sci-Fi Channel

Original release
- Network: Sci-Fi Channel
- Release: June 13, 2009

Star Runners is a 2009 Sci Fi channel original film, directed by Mat King and written by Rafael Jordan, and starring Connor Trinneer, James Kyson Lee, Toni Trucks, Aja Evans and Michael Culkin.

== Plot ==
Tycho "Ty" Johns (Connor Trinneer) and Lei Chen (James Kyson Lee) transport a crate for the government, under the orders of Colonel Bishop (Michael Culkin), which contains a mysterious girl (Toni Trucks) in cryogenic stasis. They wake her up and discover that she has no identifying microchip in her arm, unlike the rest of society. She also does not speak. During the outer space flight, the ship is attacked by terrorists. After escaping, they crash land onto a planet in uncharted space. The survivors take shelter in an old military facility on the planet. Once inside the facility, the girl picks up a gun and has a psychic vision. In it she sees the death of the last person who held the gun, which causes her to start firing the gun in a wild manner. She comes out of the vision, as someone grabs hers. The group agrees that to cover more ground, they will split up. While Ty and Lei find a control room, the other groups explore the base and find giant bug-like creatures.

Lei activates the old computers and discovers that there was a solar storm, which caused the bugs to take cover under the protection of the "solar flare shields" that surround the compound. They can not leave the shields without burning to death. Here is where the girl first displays her unusual powers (to the group): when a member of their party tries to leave the shield to escape the bugs, the girl runs out of the shields and pulls him back in, receiving no injury, although he suffers deadly burns. Also using the computer system, they are able to view old videos that reveal the original scientists who lived here were killed by the bugs.

Meanwhile, the terrorist group that attacked their ship has caught up with them and entered the compound. They have also encountered the bugs and decide to form a temporary truce until they can escape this planet. They are after the girl. While looking for weapons to use against the bugs, a member of their group is attacked by a bug. The girl tries to save him and is injured, only to completely heal in a matter of seconds. The act of healing also seems to have helped her memory, as she now remembers her name—Asta. Ty wonders out loud about her, and the leader of the terrorists says, "It'll make sense soon," and nothing more. Using the computer system, the team discovers a tunnel to another compound that still has a ship they can use to escape, but when they try to use the tunnels, they are overwhelmed by the bugs. Lei, mortally wounded, sacrifices himself by overloading his pistol, causing a small explosion. The team discovers another of the girl's powers when she is able to create an energy shield to protect them from the blast.

Using the computer, they decide to take their chances and run to the other compound in between solar flares. Along the way, the terrorists reveal why this girl is so important to them. According to the government, a human colony of over a million people on the planet Centauri III was completely wiped out by a massive solar flare. These terrorists claim that it was no solar flare. They say that the colony was a group of rebels who did not want to be under the control of the government, so they were wiped out, leaving Asta as the sole survivor. Asta remembers none of this. By the time the team arrives at the other compound, only four people remain: Ty, Asta, one of the terrorists and a woman from the original transport ship named Janessa (Aja Evans).

Using the computers in the new compound, they discover what these installations were originally constructed to create a thermonuclear weapon to mimic the radiation signature of a solar flare to use against the citizens of Centauri III ("Project Icarus"). Watching the video, the team also discovers that the bugs they have been battling are the descendants of stowaway Earth bugs that evolved under the solar activity of this planet. Upon this discovery, Asta's memory completely returns. She remembers the attack on her planet as a child and the military Colonel Bishop who found her and left her there to die in the radiation.

With Asta's memory restored, her full powers are unleashed and she creates an energy beam to fight off the bugs. Only three make it off the planet: Asta, Janessa, and Ty, who has promised to take Asta to the terrorist group in the outskirts. Meanwhile, Colonel Bishop, who has been following Ty's progress ever since he found out the ship disappeared, has caught up to them. Janessa is revealed to be Bishop's secret operative, stunning Ty and attempting to kidnap Asta to bring her on board Bishop's ship. Asta overpowers her, but decides to go to Bishop anyway, seeking answers.

Bishop reveals that the inhabitants of Centauri III were being "changed" by the solar flares of their sun. They were developing psychic and telekinetic powers; "the next step in human evolution." This is why they were killed, not because of their political beliefs. Asta leaves him alive, telling him of her plans to expose the truth with the videos they downloaded from the compound's computers.

Asta wakes Ty and they escape, crippling Bishop's ship in the process. They are forced to crash land on the same planet the others have just escaped from, surrounded by the bugs. The movie ends as Asta and Ty plan to tell the world about Centauri III before heading to the outskirts, as they promised.

== Cast ==
- Connor Trinneer as Tycho 'Ty' Johns
- James Kyson as Lei Chen (as James Kyson Lee)
- Toni Trucks as Asta
  - Irina Georgieva as young Asta
- Aja Evans as Jenessa
- Michael Culkin as Colonel Bishop
- Atanas Srebrev as Santen
- Hristo Mitzkov as Hicks
- Shelly Varod as Lyekka
- Todd Jensen as Hudson
- Mike Johnson as Kai
- Yana Marinova as Stark
- Velizar Binev as Bilal
- Velislav Pavlov as Nikopol
- George Zlatarev as Yuri Koralev
- Nikolai Sotirov as Uncle (as Nicky Sotirov)
- Andrew Pfeffer as Ticket Agent
- Nick Harvey as Bartender
- Mike Straub as Father (as Michael Straub)
- Chris Thompson as Scientist
- Velizara Stoyanova as Dancer
