= The Box (2007 film) =

American crime film

- Film poster
- Directed by: A.J. Kparr
- Written by: A.J. Kparr
- Produced by: Joseph Agresta Jr. Joe Di Maio; Brett Donowho; Steve Hovde; Alexander Kane; James Madio; Michael Matthias; Dan McDermott; Rich Minchik; Steve Perkins; Margarita Timothee; F.X. Vitolo
- Starring: Gabrielle Union; Anjelah Johnson; A.J. Buckley; Giancarlo Esposito; RZA; Jason Winston George; Brett Donowho
- Cinematography: Sion Michel
- Edited by: Frederick Wardell
- Music by: James T. Sale
- Distributed by: Vivendi Entertainment
- Release date: 2007
- Running time: 87 minutes
- Country: United States
- Language: English

The Box is a 2007 American crime film starring Gabrielle Union, A.J. Buckley, RZA, Giancarlo Esposito, Jason Winston George, Brett Donowho and written and directed by A.J. Kparr.

== Plot ==
A disgraced former LAPD cop leads a home invasion in search of millions in stolen money. The crime goes wrong and homicide detectives seeking answers interrogate the only survivors, a thief and one of the victims.
