= Kerri Medders =

American actress and singer

- Born: Kerri Ann Medders; January 7, 2000 (age 26); Houston, Texas, U.S.
- Occupation: Actress, Singer
- Years active: 2010–present

Kerri Medders (born January 7, 2000) is an American actress and singer best known for her roles as Gwenny in the sitcom Alexa & Katie and Emma Hayes in the SEAL Team.

== Early life ==
Medders was born in Houston, Texas on January 7, 2000. Medders moved to Los Angeles in 2010 with her mother to follow her dreams of becoming a recording artist leaving her dad behind to run the family business. She released her first album at the age of 12 and at age 15 she released the album Etched which included fan favorite RunLove. Her music influences are Madonna and Cyndi Lauper.

== Career ==
Her first acting role was in the crime film Point of Death in 2010. Medders first recurring role was in the sitcom Alexa & Katie starring Paris Berelc and Isabel May where she played the antagonist Gwenny. Medders then got another recurring role in the Latinx family drama Promised Land where she played a younger version of Bellamy Youngs character Margaret. Medders first major role in her acting career was in SEAL Team where she played Emma, daughter of David Boreanaz.

== Personal life ==
Medders has two siblings, a brother and sister. She was previously in relationships with singer Liam Atteridge and musician Holden Glazer

== Filmography ==
=== Film ===
- Tracker (2026)
- SEAL Team (2017-2024)
- Quantum Leap (2022)
- Bring It On: Cheer or Die (2022)
- Jane (2022)
- Promised Land (2022)
- Spin (2021)
- Panic (2021)
- The Runner (2021)
- Alexa & Katie (2018-2020)
- UnHinged (2020)
- Young Sheldon (2019)
- Do Not Reply (2019)
- Andover (2017)
- Speechless (2016)
- Gamer's Guide to Pretty Much Everything (2016)
- Mystery Girls (2014)
- Microeconomics (2012)
- Curse of the Golden Orb (2012)
- Point of Death (2010)

== Discography ==
- The Bold and the Beautiful (2012)
- Etched (2015)
- Lot 17 (2017)
