= Senior chief petty officer =

US military rank

Senior Chief Petty Officer
- Collar devices for the Navy and Coast Guard

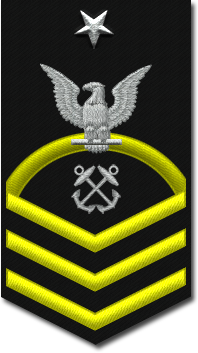
- Rank insignia for the Navy and Coast Guard

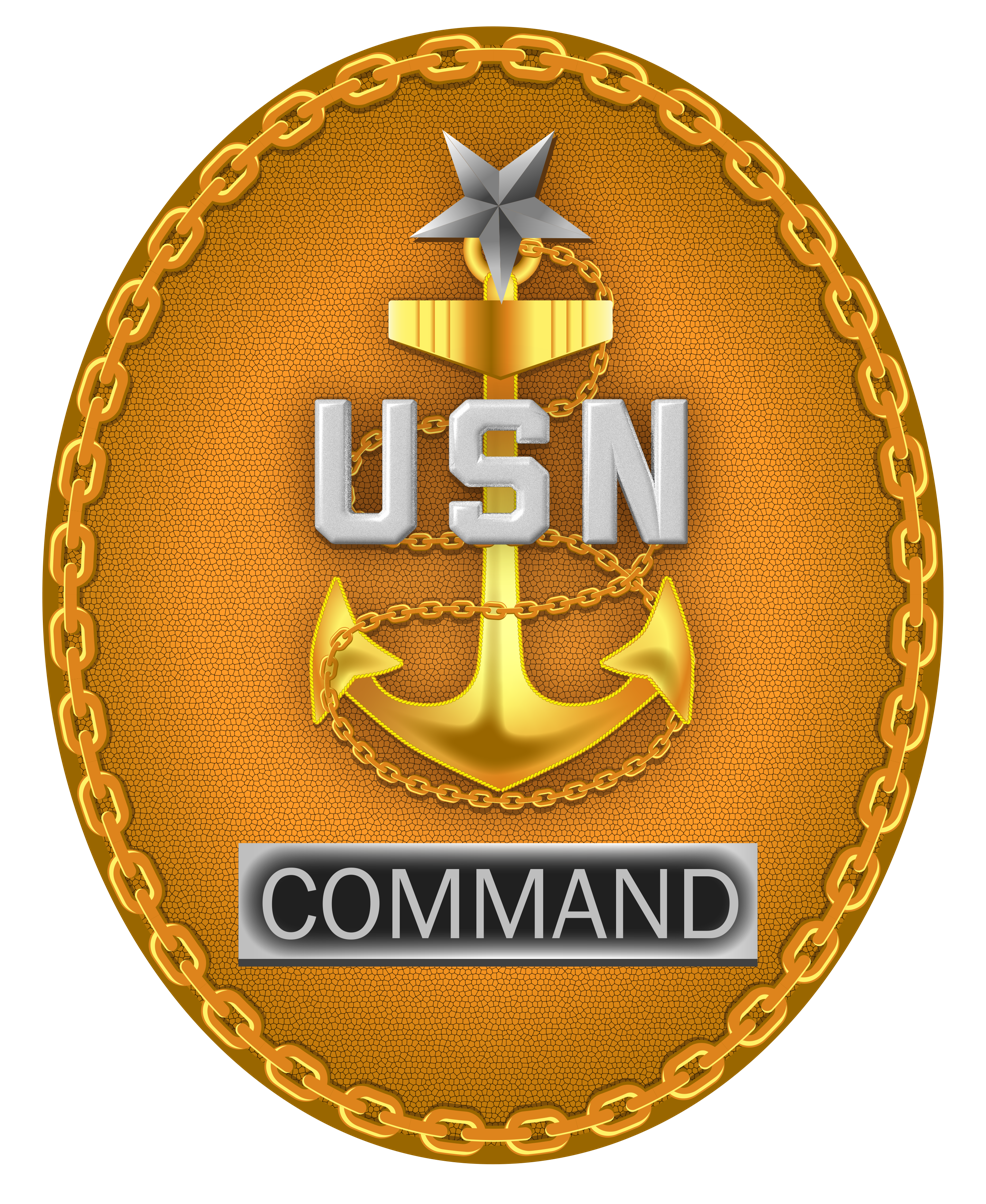
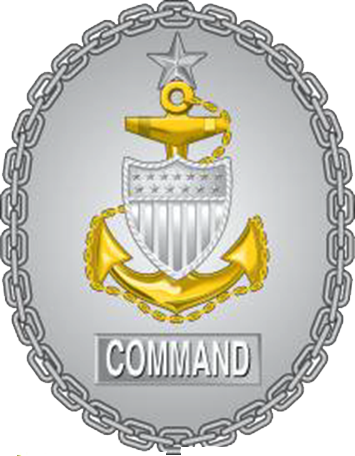
- Command Senior Chief
- Country: United States
- Service branch: United States Navy; United States Coast Guard
- Abbreviation: SCPO
- Rank group: Non-commissioned officer
- NATO rank code: OR-8
- Pay grade: E-8
- Next higher rank: Master chief petty officer
- Next lower rank: Chief petty officer
- Equivalent ranks: Master sergeant (Army & USMC); Senior master sergeant (USAF & USSF)

Senior chief petty officer (SCPO) is the eighth enlisted rank (with the pay grade E-8) in the United States Navy and Coast Guard, is above chief petty officer and below master chief petty officer.

Senior chief petty officer was created June 1, 1958 under the authorization of the Military Pay Act of 1958 for both the Navy and Coast Guard. Navy-wide examinations for chiefs were held on August 5, 1958, and promotions became effective November 16, 1958. A second group of chiefs from the February 1959 examinations were promoted to E-8 and E-9 effective on May 16, 1959.

Advancement to senior chief petty officer is similar to that of chief petty officer. It carries requirements of time in service, superior evaluation scores, and peer review. In the Navy, it is the first promotion that is based entirely on proven leadership performance; test scores do not play a part. After three years in the current grade, a chief petty officer can only advance to senior chief if a board of master chiefs approve, convened every year around March. Senior chief petty officers make up just 2.5% of the total enlisted force of the Navy and overall fall within the top 4% of the enlisted ranks.

== Command senior chief petty officer ==
As of 2005 and after a pilot program taking place on three mine countermeasures ships, the Navy started appointing senior chiefs to command billets. Until this time, senior chiefs had a senior enlisted leadership role in the submarine force as chiefs of the boat. This new effort works to formalize leadership at the senior chief level. In July 2015, the rate was formally established as a rating. Before it had been a billet instead of a rating.

The USCG also has the grade of Command Senior Chief Petty Officer (Silver Badge).

== See also ==
- List of comparative military ranks
- List of United States Navy enlisted rates
- Petty officer – Military rank
