= Max Thieriot =

American actor (born 1988)

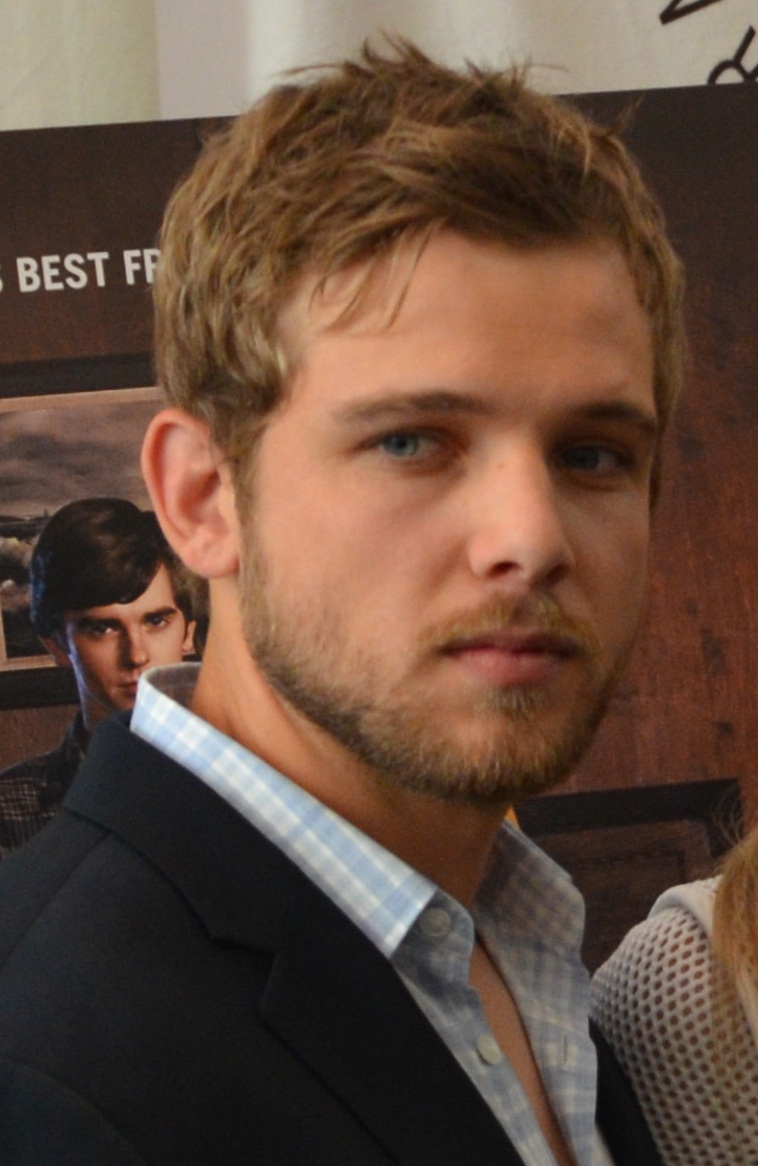
- Thieriot in 2013
- Born: Maximillion Drake Thieriot; October 14, 1988 (age 38); Los Altos Hills, California, U.S.
- Occupation: Actor
- Years active: 2004–present
- Spouse: Lexi Murphy (m. 2013)
- Children: 2
- Relatives: M. H. de Young (great-great-grandfather); Michael Stutes (brother-in-law)

Maximillion Drake Thieriot (/ˈtɛriɒt/; born October 14, 1988) is an American actor. He made his acting debut in the 2004 adventure comedy film Catch That Kid. Thieriot has since appeared in the action comedy The Pacifier (2005), the mystery comedy Nancy Drew (2007), the sci-fi Jumper (2008), the erotic thriller Chloe (2009), the supernatural horror My Soul to Take (2010), the drama Disconnect (2012), the psychological horror-thriller House at the End of the Street (2012), and the action-thriller Point Break (2015).

From 2013 to 2017, Thieriot starred as Dylan Massett in A&E's drama-thriller series Bates Motel. He appeared as John Coffee "Jack" Hays in History Channel's miniseries Texas Rising (2015). From 2017 to 2022, he played Navy SEAL Clay Spenser in the CBS drama series SEAL Team. As of 2022, Thieriot stars as Bode Leone in the CBS drama series Fire Country, which he also co-created and sometimes writes and produces.

== Early life ==
Thieriot was born in Los Altos Hills, California, the son of Bridgit Ann (née Snyder) and George Cameron Thieriot. He has one older sister and one younger brother. He was raised in the small town of Occidental in Sonoma County, California. Thieriot was educated at the Sonoma Country Day School in Santa Rosa for middle school, and went on to attend El Molino High School in nearby Forestville, from which he graduated in 2006. Thieriot's ancestors once owned the San Francisco Chronicle. His great-great-grandfather, M. H. de Young co-founded the paper with his brother Charles de Young, and his relatives, Charles and Richard Thieriot, were the editors and publishers of the paper. Thieriot's paternal grandparents, Frances Harrison (née Dade) and Ferdinand Melly Thieriot, died in the collision and sinking of the Italian liner SS Andrea Doria off the coast of Nantucket in 1956, which Thieriot's paternal uncle Peter, 13 years old at the time, survived.

== Career ==
Thieriot was signed to talent manager Don Gibble after taking his improvisation class. He modeled for Gap and appeared in two short films, before being cast in his first feature film role, 2004's adventure film Catch That Kid. He was subsequently cast in 2005's action comedy film The Pacifier, portraying one of the family members protected by a Navy SEAL (Vin Diesel). He was nominated for the Young Artist Award for Best Performance in a Feature Film – Supporting Young Actor for his role. Thieriot then appeared in the drama The Astronaut Farmer (2007) and the film adaptation of Nancy Drew (2007).

In 2008, he played a younger version of Hayden Christensen's character in Jumper. That same year, he appeared in Kit Kittredge: An American Girl, for which he won the Young Artist Award Best Performance in a Feature Film – Young Ensemble Cast with his co-stars. In 2009, Thieriot co-starred in the erotic thriller Chloe. Chloe enjoyed commercial success and became director Atom Egoyan's biggest ever box office earner. The following year, he played the lead role in Wes Craven's horror film My Soul to Take.

In 2011, he starred in the independent comedy The Family Tree and played the lead role in the drama film Foreverland. Thieriot then co-starred in the Mark Tonderai–directed psychological horror-thriller House at the End of the Street (2012). That same year, he starred in the drama film Disconnect. Also in 2012, Thieriot was cast in a leading role in Roland Emmerich's drama pilot for ABC, Dark Horse, but the project was not picked up to series. From 2013 until its ending in 2017, he portrayed Dylan Massett, the half-brother of Norman Bates, in the critically acclaimed drama series Bates Motel. He made his directorial debut on the series with the fifth season episode "Hidden".

In 2015, he starred in the History Channel event miniseries Texas Rising as Jack Hays, a captain of the Texas Rangers, and appeared in the remake of the action-thriller film Point Break. In 2017, Thieriot began starring as Navy SEAL Clay Spenser in the CBS drama series SEAL Team until 2022. In 2022, Thieriot began portraying Bode Leone in the CBS drama series Fire Country, for which he also serves as a producer.

== Personal life ==
In 2012, Thieriot became engaged to Lexy Murphy, his girlfriend of seven years. He proposed during a trip to the Caribbean, where the two met as teenagers. On June 1, 2013, they were married in Truckee, California. The couple announced the birth of their first child, a boy, in 2015. Their second son was born in 2018. Through his sister's marriage, Thieriot is the brother-in-law of former Philadelphia Phillies baseball pitcher Michael Stutes.

As well as being an actor, Thieriot is a vintner. He, along with childhood friends Christopher Strieter and Myles Lawrence-Briggs, owns vineyards in his hometown of Occidental and distributes wine through their label Senses. In the third season of Bates Motel, the main characters can be seen drinking Senses during a family-dinner scene.

== Filmography ==
=== Film ===
Year	Title	Role	Notes
2004	Catch That Kid	Gus	
2005	The Pacifier	Seth Plummer	
2007	The Astronaut Farmer	Shepard Farmer	
2007	Nancy Drew	Ned Nickerson	
2008	Jumper	Young David Rice	
2008	Kit Kittredge: An American Girl	Will Shepherd	
2010	My Soul to Take	Adam "Bug" Hellerman	
2010	Stay Cool	Shasta's Boyfriend	
2010	Chloe	Michael Stewart	
2011	The Family Tree	Eric Burnett	
2011	Foreverland	Will Rankin	
2012	Yellow	Young Nowell	
2012	Disconnect	Kyle	
2012	House at the End of the Street	Ryan Jacobson	
2015	Point Break	Jeff	

=== Television series ===
Year	Title	Role	Notes
2012	Dark Horse	Carter Henderson	Unsold TV pilot
2013–2017	Bates Motel	Dylan Massett	Main role
2015	Texas Rising	John Hays	Recurring role; miniseries
2017–2022	SEAL Team	Clay Spenser	Main role
2022–present	Fire Country	Bode Leone	Main role; also creator and executive producer
2025–present	Sheriff Country	Bode Leone	Guest role (2 episodes); also co-creator and writer

=== Director ===
Year	Title	Notes
2017	Bates Motel	Episode: "Hidden"
2020, 2021	SEAL Team	2 episodes
2023, 2025	Fire Country	2 episodes

== Awards and nominations ==
Year	Award	Nominated work	Result	Ref.
2005	The Stinkers Bad Movie Award for Worst Performance by a Child	The Pacifier	Nominated	
2006	Young Artist Award for Best Performance in a Feature Film – Supporting Young Actor	The Pacifier	Nominated	
2009	Young Artist Award Best Performance in a Feature Film – Young Ensemble Cast	Kit Kittredge: An American Girl	Won	
