= Toni Trucks =

American actress (born 1980)

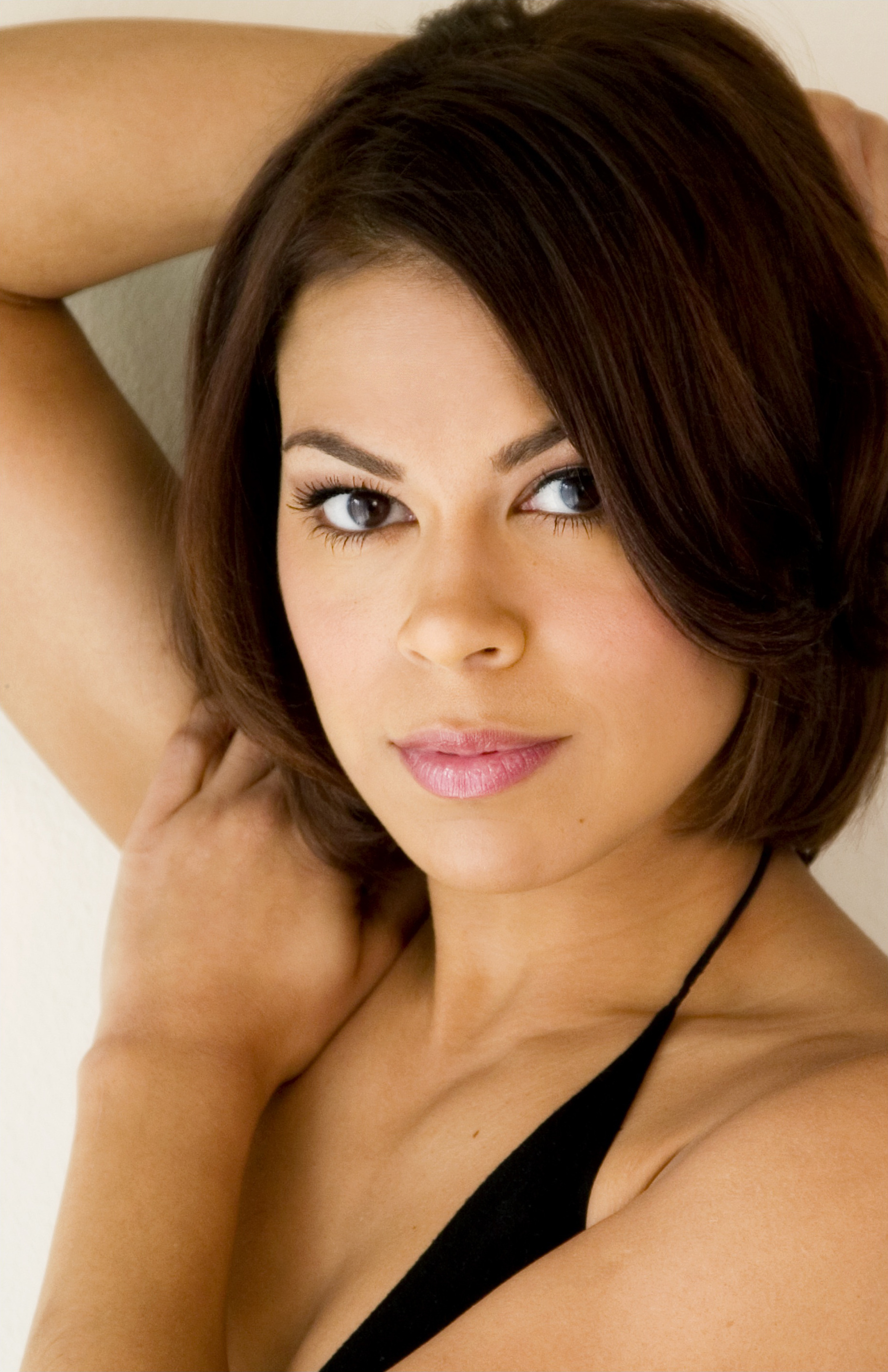
- Trucks in 2010
- Born: September 30, 1980 (age 46)
- Education: University of Michigan
- Occupation: Actress
- Years active: 2001–present
- Partner: Brandon Phillips
- Children: 1
- Website: tonitrucks.com

Toni Trucks is an American actress, best known as Lieutenant Lisa Davis on SEAL Team (2017–2024).

== Career ==
Trucks studied musical theatre at the University of Michigan School of Music, Theatre & Dance. Upon graduation, she moved to New York where she performed regionally before relocating to Los Angeles to make her television debut as the female lead on Showtime's comedy series Barbershop. Her other television credits include Hostages, The Soul Man, House, All of Us, Veronica Mars, 'Til Death, Brothers, CSI: NY and the telefilms Star Runners and Starstruck. She has made multiple guest appearances on NCIS: New Orleans and Grimm.

Her previous film credits include Dreamgirls, Weapons, The Twilight Saga: Breaking Dawn – Part 2 and Music and Lyrics.

Trucks was a series regular on CBS's military drama series SEAL Team. She played Lisa Davis, a U.S. Navy Petty Officer Logistics Specialist responsible for making the arrangements to get the team and their gear where they need to be. She went to OCS and was commissioned as an ensign and assigned back to the SEAL team as their new intelligence officer. Trucks was also a series regular in the CBS legal drama, Made in Jersey, about a working-class woman named Marina (Janet Montgomery) who uses her street smarts to compete with her more polished colleagues at a top New York law firm. Trucks played Cyndi Vega, Marina's lively secretary and "comradette" in arms. She also guest starred in the pilot of NBC's mid-season thriller Do No Harm.

Her theater credits include By the Way, Meet Vera Stark, Cactus Flower, Stormy Weather, Kiss Me, Kate, West Side Story, Oklahoma!, Follies, Footloose, Two Gentlemen of Verona, Ragtime, Sweet Charity, and Children of Eden. Trucks studied theatre abroad at London's Marymount College and has over 17 years of dance training including ballet, modern, and tap.

Trucks co-starred in the 2012 Fox Searchlight film Ruby Sparks. The film starred Paul Dano, Zoe Kazan, and was directed by Jonathan Dayton and Valerie Faris (Little Miss Sunshine). She is also featured in the final installment of the blockbuster hit series Breaking Dawn as Mary, a member of the American Nomadic Vampire coven.

== Personal life ==
In January 2022, Trucks announced she was expecting a baby boy with her partner Brandon Phillips. Their son was born in 2022.

== Filmography ==
=== Film ===
Year	Title	Role
2007	Weapons	Auntie
2007	Music and Lyrics	Tricia
2007	Mr. Art Critic	Lisa
2010	What If...	Claire
2010	Pizza with Bullets	Agent Murphy
2010	N-Secure	Denise
2010	The Cost of Heaven	Cheryl
2010	Rollers	Bailey
2012	Ruby Sparks	Susie
2012	The Twilight Saga: Breaking Dawn – Part 2	Mary
2014	Alexander and the Terrible, Horrible, No Good, Very Bad Day	Steph
2019	Scare Package	Franchesca

=== Television ===
Year	Title	Role	Notes
2005–2006	Barbershop	Terri	Main cast
2007	Veronica Mars	Phyllis	Episode: "There's Got to Be a Morning After Pill"
2007	All of Us	Michele	Recurring cast: season 4
2008	'Til Death	Randy	Episode: "Philadelphia Freedom"
2009	The Battery's Down	Nuancé	Recurring cast: season 2
2009	Brothers	Meg	Episode: "Follow the Story"
2009	Star Runners	Asta	TV movie
2010	Starstruck	Libby Lam	TV movie
2011	House	Trina	Episode: "Charity Case"
2012	CSI: NY	Alicia Woods	Episode: "Unwrapped"
2012	Made in Jersey	Cyndi Vega	Main cast
2013	The Soul Man	Gina	Episode: "Bride and Prejudice"
2013	Do No Harm	Dr. Patricia Rivers	Recurring cast
2014	Hostages	Angela Nix	Recurring cast
2014	Franklin & Bash	Anita Haskins	Main cast: season 4
2014–2015	Grimm	Deputy Sheriff Janelle Farris	Recurring cast: season 4
2015	The Mentalist	Ranger Jill Ayres	Episode: "Byzantium"
2016	Lethal Weapon	Maria Torez	Episode: "Pilot"
2016	Pure Genius	Kayla	Episode: "You Must Remember This"
2016–2017	NCIS: New Orleans	CGIS Special Agent Joan Swanson	Guest: season 2, recurring cast: season 3
2017	Criminal Minds: Beyond Borders	Kathy Hall	Episode: "Cinderella and the Dragon"
2017–2024	SEAL Team	Lisa Davis	Main cast
2018	Good Eggs	Sam	Episode: "Good Eggs"
2018–2020	Corporate	Karen James	Recurring cast: seasons 1–2, guest: season 3
