= Neil Brown Jr. =

American actor (born 1980)

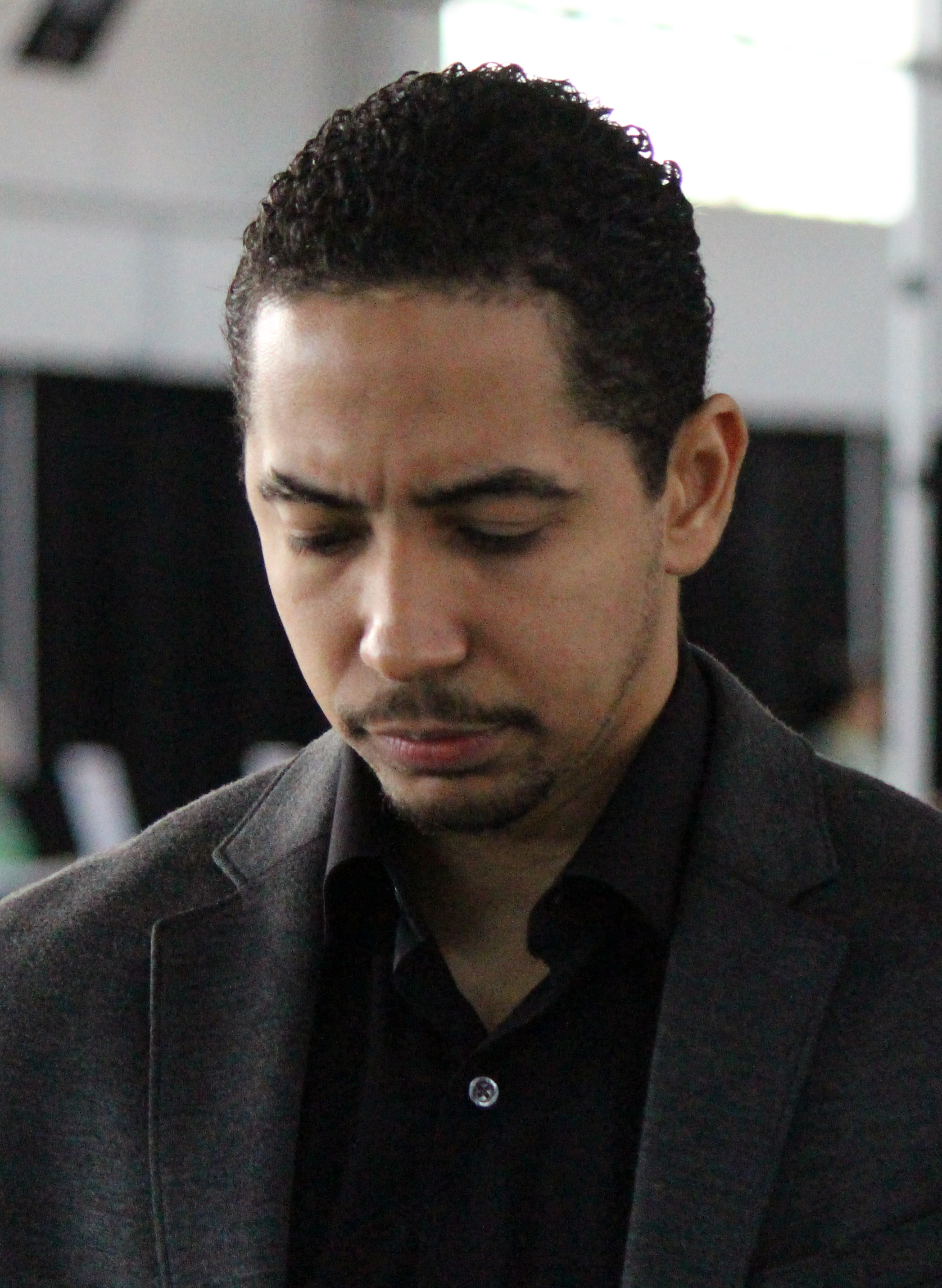
- Brown in 2015
- Born: Cornelius C. Brown Jr. June 19, 1980 (age 46); Orlando, Florida, U.S.
- Occupation: Actor
- Years active: 1995–present
- Children: 2
- Website: neilbrownjr.com

Cornelius C. "Neil" Brown Jr. (born June 19, 1980), is an American actor. His notable roles include Felix in South Beach (2006), Guillermo in The Walking Dead (2010), Clifford Danner in Suits (2011–2013), Chad Kerr in Insecure (2016–2021), and Ray Perry in SEAL Team (2017–2024). He also played DJ Yella in the 2015 biopic, Straight Outta Compton.

== Early life ==
Brown was born in Orlando, Florida, to Cornelius Brown, a U.S. Marine, and Carrie Brown, an insurance underwriter.

== Career ==
Brown appeared in the martial arts TV series WMAC Masters. He plays the smart-mouthed Marine, Lcpl. Richard "Motown" Guerrero, in the action film Battle: Los Angeles. The movie reunited him with Fast & Furious castmate Michelle Rodriguez, where he played Drug Runner and racer Malik Zon. Brown played the recurring role of Chad opposite Issa Rae and Yvonne Orji in the HBO comedy series Insecure.

== Filmography ==
=== Film ===
Year	Title	Role	Notes
2000	Tigerland	Pvt. Jamoa Kearns	
2003	Out of Time	Morgue Attendant James	
2004	Mr. 3000	Rick the Clubhouse Assistant	
2004	Back by Midnight	Inmate #3	
2006	This That Hang from Trees	Victor	
2007	Fear Itself	Marshall	Video
2008	Never Back Down	Aaron	
2009	Fast & Furious	Malik Herzon	
2009	Just Another Day	Ronny	
2009	Scare Zone	Spider	
2011	Battle: Los Angeles	LCpl. Richard "Motown" Guerrero	
2012	Kidnapped Souls	Quenton	
2015	Bad Blood	Deputy Diaz	
2015	Rivers 9	Virgil Dobbs	
2015	Straight Outta Compton	DJ Yella	
2017	Pope	Dejuan	
2017	Sand Castle	Enzo	
2017	Naked	Officer McBride	
2018	Lawless Range	Wesley Gonzalez	
2018	City of Lies	Rafael Pérez	
2019	Bayou Tales	Beauchamp	
2021	Last Night in Rozzie	Ronnie Russo	
2026	That Friend	Bill	

=== Television ===
Year	TV series	Role	Notes
1995	WMAC Masters	Jake	Episode: "Going For Gold"
1996	Second Noah	Box Boy	Episode: "God's Last Laugh"
1999	ER	Hubert Knoles	Episode: "Middle of Nowhere"
2000	Noah Knows Best	Retro	Episode: "Noah Knows Politics" & "Pink Slip-Up"
2001	America's Most Wanted	Little Boy	Episode: "Catalino Morales"
2001	Sheena	Nakele	Episode: "Children of the Lamistas"
2001	Sheena	Taya	Episode: "Unsafe Passage"
2002	Resurrection Blvd.	Teen Boxer	Episode: "En Un Momento"
2002	Birds of Prey	Highschool Student #1	Episode: "Slick"
2002	The Wonderful World of Disney	Suspect #1	Episode: "Nancy Drew"
2002	MDs	P.A.K.	Episode: "Family Secrets"
2006	Surface	Keith	Episode: "Episode: #1.11"
2006	South Beach	Felix Rodriguez	Recurring cast
2006	Everybody Hates Chris	Cute Boy #1	Episode: "Everybody Hates Valentine's Day"
2008	Army Wives	Foreman Sam Turner	Episode: "Thicker Than Water"
2009	Fear Clinic	Jarell	Episode: "Claustophobia"
2010	The Walking Dead	Guillermo	Episode: "Vatos"
2011	Harry's Law	Tank	Episode: "A Day in the Life"
2011–2013	Suits	Clifford Danner	Guest cast: season 1 - 3
2012	Castle	Eddie Gordon	Episode: "A Dance With Death"
2012	Borderline Coyotes	Paco	Recurring cast
2012	Heroic Daze	Oliver	Recurring cast
2012	Weeds	Paramedic Mike Garcia	Episode: "Messy"
2012–2014	King Bachelor's Pad	Various Roles	Recurring cast
2013	NCIS	Martin Archer	Episode: "Double Blind"
2014	NCIS: Los Angeles	Tommy Walker	Episode: "Between the Lines"
2015	CSI: Cyber	Local Detective	Episode: "Bit by Bit"
2016	Dirk Gently's Holistic Detective Agency	Detective Joel Estevez	Recurring cast: season 1
2016–2021	Insecure	Chad Kerr	Recurring cast
2017	Family Guy	Athlete with Money (voice)	Episode: "Saturated Fat Guy"
2017	American Dad!	Scummy Guy (voice)	Episode: "Kloger"
2017–2024	SEAL Team	Chief Warrant Officer Raymond "Ray" Perry	Main cast
2024	Bel-Air	Caleb	Episode: "Black Lotus"
2025	The Equalizer	James Munoz	2 episodes
2026	The Varnell Hill Show	Thad	Main Cast
