= Master chief petty officer =

Naval rank

A master chief petty officer is a senior non-commissioned officer in some navies and coast guards, usually above some grade of petty officer.

== United States ==
Master chief petty officer (United States)
- Navy MCPO Collar Insignia; USCG MCPO Collar Insignia

- USN MCPO - Fleet / Force MCPO - MCPON

- USCG MCPO - Area CMC - MCPOCG
- Country: United States
- Service branch: U.S. Navy; U.S. Coast Guard
- Abbreviation: MCPO
- Rank group: Enlisted rank
- Rank: Petty officer
- NATO rank code: OR-9
- Pay grade: E-9
- Formation: 1958
- Next higher rank: Command master chief petty officer
- Next lower rank: Senior chief petty officer
- Equivalent ranks: Sergeant major (USA); Master gunnery sergeant (USMC); Chief master sergeant (USAF & USSF)

Master chief petty officer (MCPO) is the ninth (just below the rank of MCPON) enlisted rank (with pay grade E-9) in the United States Navy and United States Coast Guard, just above Senior Chief Petty Officer (SCPO). Master chief petty officers are addressed as "Master Chief (last name)" in colloquial contexts. They constitute the top 1.25% of the enlisted members of the maritime forces.

Prior to 1958, chief petty officer was the highest enlisted rate in both the U.S. Navy and U.S. Coast Guard. This changed on 20 May 1958 with the passage of Public Law 85-422, the Military Pay Act of 1958, which established two new enlisted pay grades of E-8 and E-9 in all five branches of the U.S. Armed Forces. In the Navy and Coast Guard, the new E-8 pay grade was titled Senior Chief Petty Officer and the new E-9 pay grade as Master Chief Petty Officer, with the first selectees promoting to their respective grades in 1959 and 1960.

=== Advancement ===
In the US Navy, advancement to master chief petty officer is similar to that of chief petty officer and senior chief petty officer. It carries requirements of time in service, superior evaluation scores, and selection by a board of master chiefs. Similarly, senior chief petty officers and chief petty officers are chosen by selection boards. In the Coast Guard, advancement to master chief petty officer is done by competing in a single annual board. The board ranks all eligible senior chiefs using their career records. Master chief petty officers are then selected monthly from this prioritization list as positions become available.

Petty officers of all grades possess both a rate (the enlisted term for rank) and rating (job, similar to a military occupational specialty (MOS) in other branches). The full title (most commonly used) is a combination of the two. Thus, a master chief petty officer with the rating of fire controlman would properly be called a master chief fire controlman.

==== Command master chief petty officer ====
Master chief petty officers are generally considered to be the technical experts in their fields. They serve at sea and ashore in commands of all sizes. Some master chiefs choose to enter the command master chief petty officer program. If selected, a master chief receives additional leadership training and is assigned to a command as the command master chief (CMC). The command master chief is the senior enlisted person at a command and works as a liaison between the commanding officer and the enlisted ranks, serving as the senior enlisted leader. In this capacity, the CMC assists the commanding officer in issues of quality of life, discipline, training, and morale.

==== Fleet and force master chief petty officer ====
Fleet and force master chiefs are appointed by the commander of a fleet or a force command to serve as their senior enlisted adviser. These two ranks are equivalent and their insignia is also the same—a master chief rating badge with two gold stars above the eagle and a gold star for the rating insignia.

A force master chief petty officer (FORCM) is a master chief who has virtually the same responsibility as command master chiefs, but for larger force commands rather than a single unit. There are 15 force master chief positions in the Navy.

A fleet master chief petty officer (FLTCM) is a master chief who again has virtually the same responsibility as command master chiefs, but for larger fleet commands. There are four fleet master chief positions in the Navy.

==== Master Chief Petty Officer of the Navy ====
One unique position, Master Chief Petty Officer of the Navy, is appointed by the Chief of Naval Operations to serve as the most senior enlisted member in the Navy. The MCPON adds a third star above the rating insignia described earlier, and all three stars are gold (silver on the gold foul anchor collar device). Likewise, the rating specialty mark is replaced by a gold star.

==== Master Chief Petty Officer of the Coast Guard ====
The Master Chief Petty Officer of the Coast Guard (MCPOCG) is appointed by the Commandant of the Coast Guard to serve as the most senior enlisted member in the Coast Guard. The MCPOCG adds a third star above the rating insignia described earlier, and all three stars are gold (silver on the gold foul anchor collar device). Likewise, the rating specialty mark is replaced by a gold shield.

== India ==
Master chief petty officer 1st Class and Master chief petty officer 2nd Class are Junior Commissioned Officers (JCO) in the Indian Navy. They are technical experts and function much more like US and UK navy warrant officers.

== See also ==
- Goat locker
- Petty officer
- U.S. Navy enlisted rate insignia
- Comparative military ranks
