= A. J. Buckley =

Canadian actor

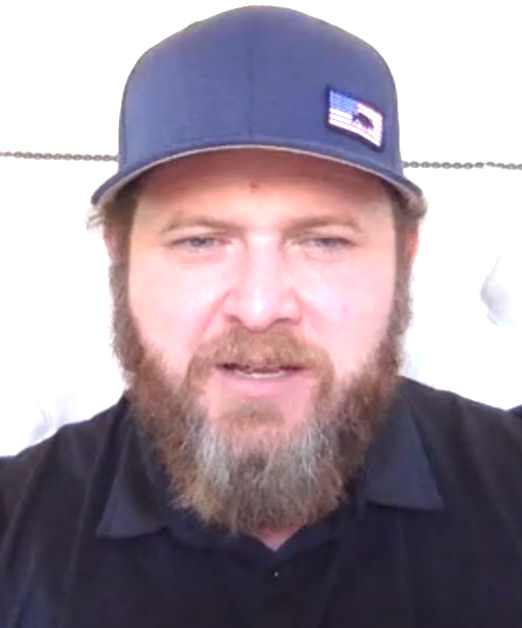
- Buckley in 2020
- Born: Alan John Buckley
- Other names: AJ Buckley, Alan Buckley
- Occupation: Actor
- Years active: 1994–present
- Partner: Abigail Ochse (2010–present)
- Children: 3

Alan John Buckley is a Canadian actor. He played crime lab technician Adam Ross on the television series CSI: NY (2005–2013) and Navy SEAL Sonny Quinn on the television series SEAL Team (2017–2024). He also had roles in Supernatural (2006–2014), The Box (2007), Home Sweet Hell (2015), and as the voice of Nash in The Good Dinosaur (2015).

== Early life ==
Born in Dublin, Ireland, Buckley immigrated with his family at age six to White Rock, British Columbia, Canada.

In his teens, Buckley began his acting career in the television series The Odyssey followed by guest starring roles in The X-Files and Millennium.

Buckley attended St. Thomas More Collegiate in Burnaby, near Vancouver.

== Career ==
Buckley appeared in the 1998 thriller science fiction film, Disturbing Behavior, alongside actress Katie Holmes. In 2001 he starred in an indie film called Extreme Days, also a comedy-drama-romance flick. In 2005, Buckley was offered the part of Adam Ross on the hit crime drama CSI: NY. The part was supposed to be a recurring role, but by the end of the show's third season in 2007, he was offered a five-year contract. Before receiving the role of Adam Ross, Buckley had appeared as a different character on the original CSI: Crime Scene Investigation in a 2004 episode.

In 2006, the film Jimmy and Judy was released. When the CSI: NY episode featuring Buckley aired in 2006, director Randall K. Rubin called Buckley to discuss the success of an episode of CSI: NY, entitled "Down the Rabbit Hole" and the internet activity it had generated for Buckley. Harold Whaley, program director for Urban Network, suggested the idea of an in-world premiere featuring Buckley as a guest host and panellist for a post-screening Q&A.

Buckley starred as Sonny Quinn on SEAL Team, an American military drama television series that premiered on CBS for four seasons and switched to Paramount+ for the fifth and sixth seasons.

== Personal life ==
Buckley proposed to his girlfriend of two years, Abigail Ochse on 31 December 2012 while on vacation in Hawaii. On 3 September 2013 Buckley announced they were expecting a baby girl. The couple welcomed their daughter on 19 January 2014. On 24 October 2014, while in New Zealand, Buckley fractured his arm and leg while running away during a "scare event."

In 2019, Buckley played on the "Away" roster during the NBA All-Star Celebrity Game at the Bojangles' Coliseum in Charlotte, North Carolina.

== Filmography ==
=== Film ===
Year	Title	Role	Notes
1998	Disturbing Behavior	Charles "Chug" Roman	
2000	The In Crowd	Wayne	
2001	The Forsaken	Mike	
2001	XCU: Extreme Close Up	Terrance 'T-Bone' Tucker	
2001	Extreme Days	Will Davidson	
2002	Scream at the Sound of the Beep	Peter	
2002	10:30 Check-Out	Alex	
2002	Blue Car	Pat	
2002	Wishcraft	Howie	
2002	Girl Fever	Jesse	
2002	Nightstalker	Somo	
2004	In Enemy Hands	U.S.S. Swordfish: Medical Officer	
2004	Wild Roomies	Reno Rizzolla	
2006	Jimmy and Judy	Buddy	
2006	You Did What?	Greg Porter	
2006	Happy Feet	Additional voices	
2006	Walking Tall: The Payback	Harvey Morris	
2007	The Last Sin Eater	Angor Forbes	
2007	The Box	Danny Schamus	
2010	Skateland	Teddy Tullos	
2010	Christmas Mail	Matt Sanders	
2011	Doomsday Prophecy	Eric Fox	
2015	Home Sweet Hell	Murphy	
2015	The Good Dinosaur	Nash	Voice
2025	Hunting Season	Davenport	

=== Television ===
Year	Title	Role	Notes
1994	The Disappearance of Vonnie	Robbie	Television film
1995	Are You Afraid of the Dark?	Lonnie	Episode: "The Tale of the Manaha"
1996	The X-Files	The 'Dude'	Episode: "War of the Coprophages"
1997	Millennium	Josh Comstock	Episode: "Weeds" (uncredited)
1997	North of 60	Ricky	Episode: "Ghosts"
1998	Night Man	Commander	Episode: "It Came from Out of the Sky"
1999	In a Class of His Own	Jake Matteson	Television film
2000	NYPD Blue	Roger Lundquist	Episode: "Goodbye Charlie"
2001	Jack & Jill	Mitch	Episode: "And Nothing But the Truth"
2001	Motocrossed	Jimmy Bottles	Television film
2001	Murphy's Dozen	Sean Murphy	Television film
2002	Haunted	Brian Hewitt	Episode: "Grievous Angels"
2003	Without a Trace	Richie Dobson	Episode: "Underground Railroad"
2003	The District	Gaines	Episode: "The Kindness of Strangers"
2003	Silent Warnings	Layne Vossimer	Television film
2004	CSI: Crime Scene Investigation	Ted Martin	Episode: "Crow's Feet"
2004	The Collector	The Devil / Bill Diggs	Episode: "The Old Man"
2005	Manticore	Pvt. Sulley	Television film
2005	Fat Actress	McG Stand-In	Episode: "Charlies Angels or Too Pooped to Pop"
2005–13	CSI: NY	Adam Ross	141 episodes
2006–14	Supernatural	Ed Zeddmore	5 episodes
2007	Entourage	Dave	Episode: "Snow Job"
2007	Bones	Dan	Episode: "The Glowing Bones in 'The Old Stone House'"
2008–09	Wolverine and the X-Men	Toad / Mortimer Toynbee	Voice, recurring role
2009	The Super Hero Squad Show	Toad, Melter, Klaw, Batroc the Leaper	Voices, 4 episodes
2012–15	Teenage Mutant Ninja Turtles	Pigeon Pete	Voice, 4 episodes
2012	Flashpoint	Harold Beamer	Episode: "Fit for Duty"
2013	Longmire	Keith Dixon	Episode: "Natural Order"
2014	Justified	Danny Crowe	9 episodes
2015	The Mentalist	Aaron "Ace" Brunell	Episode: "Nothing Gold Can Stay"
2015	Murder in the First	Marty 'Junior' Mulligan	Main cast; Season 2
2015	Narcos	Kevin Brady	Episode: "Descenso"
2015	Blue Bloods	Sgt. Mulvey	Episode: "Unsung Heroes"
2015	Hawaii Five-0	Julius Brennan	Episode: "E 'Imi pono"
2017	Pure	Det. Bronco Novak	Main cast, season 1
2017–24	SEAL Team	Sonny Quinn	Main cast
2026–27	9-1-1: Nashville	The Pharaoh	Recurring role

=== Web ===
Year	Title	Role	Notes
2010–2011	Ghostfacers	Ed Zeddmore	11 episodes
2011	Talent	Marcus	10 episodes

=== Video games ===
Year	Title	Role	Notes
2007	Kingdom Hearts II: Final Mix+	Additional Voices	
2008	CSI: NY	Adam Ross	
2015	Disney Infinity 3.0	Nash	
