= Katie =

- Pronunciation: /ˈkeɪti/ KAY-tee
- Gender: female

Origin
- Language: Greek
- Meaning: "pure"
- Region of origin: English-speaking countries

Other names
- Related names: Katherine, Kathryn, Catherine, Kate, Katy, Kaytee, Kayteigh, Katerina, Caitlyn, Kathleen, Katayoun, Catie, Cathy, Cady, Ceitidh

Katie is an English feminine name. It is a form of Katherine, Kate, Caitlin, Kathleen, Katey and their related forms. It is frequently used on its own.

== People ==
=== Sports ===
- Katie Boulter (born 1996), British tennis player
- Katie Burrows (born 1982), American basketball coach
- Katie Chan (born 2003), Canadian ice hockey player
- Katie Clark (born 1994), British synchronized swimmer
- Katie Cronin (born 1977), American basketball player
- Katie Dabson, British sailor
- Katie DeSa (born 2004), American ice hockey player
- Katie Healy (born 1998), English professional boxer
- Katie Hill (born 1984), Australian wheelchair basketball player
- Katie Hnida (born 1981), American NCAA football player
- Katie Hoff (born 1989), American Olympic swimmer
- Katie Kubiak (born 2003), American Paralympic swimmer
- Katie Ledecky (born 1997), American swimmer
- Katie Levick (born 1991), English cricketer
- Katie MacFarlane (born 1982), former American women's basketball player and a current U.S. Army intelligence officer
- Katie Meier (born 1967), American former basketball coach
- Katie Sowers (born 1986), American football coach
- Katie Swan (born 1999), British tennis player
- Kati Tabin (born 1997), Canadian ice hockey player
- Katie Taylor (born 1986), Irish boxer and footballer, five-time world boxing and 2012 Olympic champion
- Katie Thorlakson (born 1985), Canadian soccer player

=== Television and film ===
- Katie Aselton (born 1978), American actress, director, and producer
- Katie Brown (TV personality) (born 1963), American television presenter
- Katie Couric (born 1957), American journalist
- Katie Cassidy (born 1986), American actress and singer
- Katie Featherston (born 1982), American actress
- Katie Finneran (born 1971), American actress
- Katie Griffin (born 1973), Canadian actress, voice actress, and singer
- Katie Holmes (born 1978), American actress
- Katie Hopkins (born 1975), British media personality and far-right political commentator
- Katie Leclerc (born 1986), American actress
- Katie Leung (born 1987), Scottish actress
- Katie Lucas (born 1988), American actress and writer
- Katie McGrath (born c. 1983), Irish actress and model
- Katie Piper (born 1983), British broadcaster and model, wounded in a 2008 acid attack
- Katie Tallo, Canadian filmmaker, screenwriter, and novelist

=== Music ===
- Katie Gately, American musician, composer, producer and sound designer
- Katie Gregson-MacLeod (born 2000/2001), Scottish musician
- Katie Kim (born 1993), South Korean-born American singer
- Katie Kissoon (born 1951, Trinidad and Tobago), English singer
- Katie Kittermaster (born 2000), British singer-songwriter
- Katie Knipp, American singer, songwriter, multi-instrumentalist, and blues Americana artist
- Katie Melua (born 1984), Georgian-born British singer-songwriter
- Katie Phar (c. 1899–1943), American singer and labor activist
- Katie Ann Powell, American harpist and beauty pageant title holder
- Katie Underwood (born 1975), Australian singer-songwriter
- Katie Waissel (born 1986), British singer and contestant in the seventh series of The X Factor (UK)
- Katie White (born 1983), English singer and front-woman of The Ting Tings

=== Other ===
- Katie Rose Clarke (born 1984), American musical theatre actress and singer
- Katie Booth (1907–2006), American biomedical chemist and civil rights activist
- Katie Bouman (born 1989/90), American computer imaging scientist, led the team that captured the first image of a black hole
- Katie Bush, American digital, net, and installation artist
- Katie Davis (missionary), American missionary and author
- Katie Jayne Field, British bioscientist
- Katie Hafner (born 1957), American journalist
- Katie Heaney (born 1986), American writer
- Katie Hillier (born 1973/74), British fashion designer
- Katie Mack (born 1981), American astrophysicist
- Katie May (1981–2016), American model
- Katie McVicar (1856–1886), Canadian trade unionist and shoe worker
- Katie Mitchell (born 1964), English theatre director
- Katie Cabell Currie Muse (1861–1927), American socialite and clubwoman
- Katie Perry (born 1980), Australian designer
- Katie Price (born 1978), British model also known as "Jordan"
- Katie Rackliff (died 1992), American murder victim
- Katie Rough (2009–2017), English girl killed by a 15-year-old female
- Katie Savannah Steele (born 1992), American model rocketeer
- Katie Stuart (reformer) (1862–1925), British South African evangelist and temperance leader
- Katie Taft (born 1972), American artist, photographer, and teacher

== Fictional characters ==
- Katie Bell, in the Harry Potter series by J.K. Rowling
- Katie Fitch, in the British teen drama Skins
- Katie Gardner, in the Percy Jackson & the Olympians series by Rick Riordan
- Katie Logan, a character in The Bold and the Beautiful
- Katie Matlin, in the Canadian television drama Degrassi
- Katie Peretti, in the CBS soap opera As the World Turns
- Katie Power (Energizer), a member of the Power Pack in Marvel Comics
- Katie Sugden, in the ITV soap opera Emmerdale
- Katie Walker, the Yellow Time Force Ranger in the children's action television series Power Rangers: Time Force

== Other ==
- Katie (monkey), who played Marcel in the American sitcom Friends
- Katie, the Los Angeles Angels of Anaheim Rally Monkey

== See also ==
- Katey
- Katy (disambiguation)
