= Jessica Paré =

Canadian actress

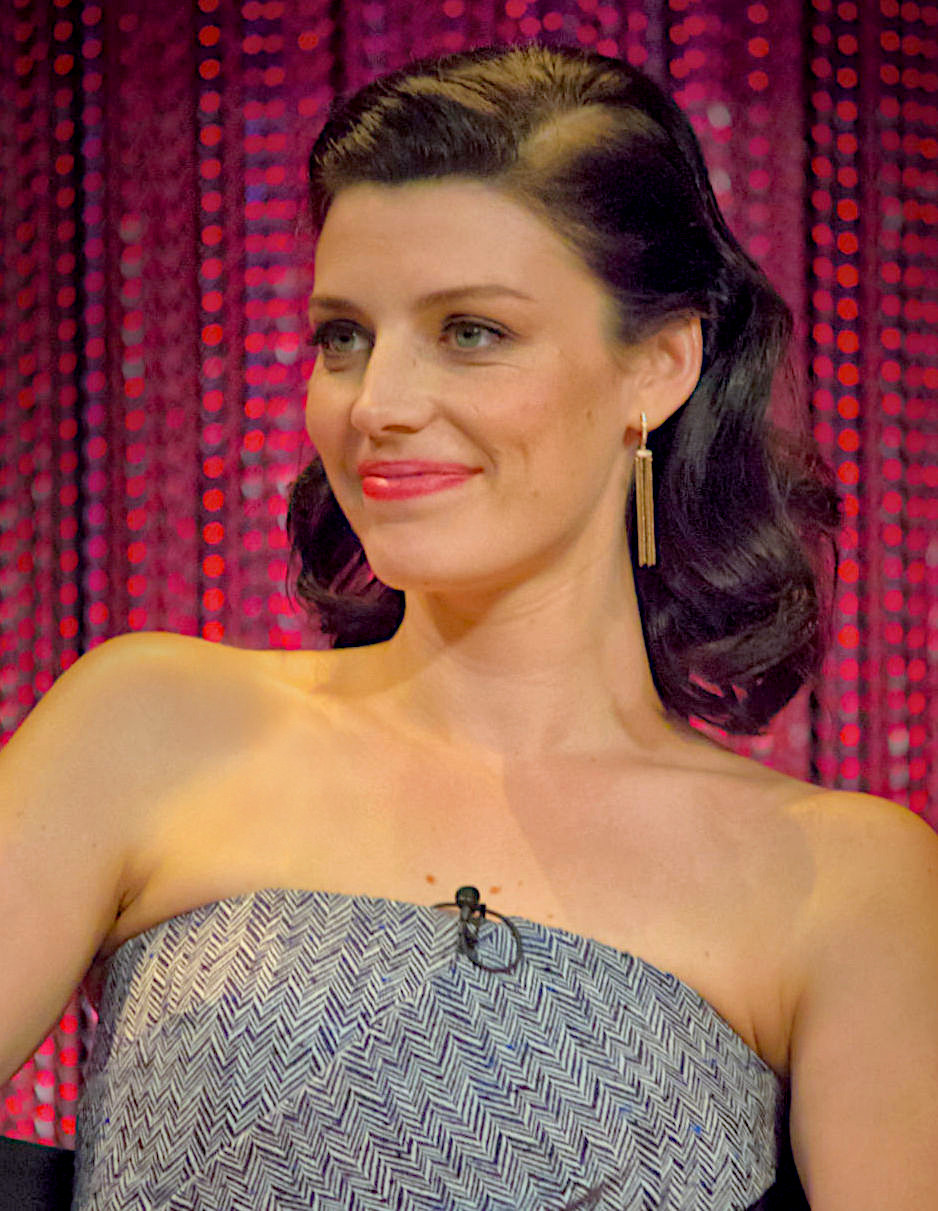
- Paré at PaleyFest in 2014
- Born: December 5, 1980 (age 45); Montreal, Quebec, Canada
- Occupations: Actress, musician
- Years active: 1996–present
- Spouse: Joseph M. Smith (m. 2007; div. 2010)
- Partner: John Kastner
- Children: 1

Jessica Paré (born December 5, 1980) is a Canadian actress and singer, known for her roles on the AMC series Mad Men and the CBS series SEAL Team. She has also appeared in the films Stardom (2000), Lost and Delirious (2001), Wicker Park (2004), Suck (2009), Hot Tub Time Machine (2010), and Brooklyn (2015).

== Early life and family ==
Paré was born in Montreal, Quebec, the daughter of Anthony Paré, former chair of the education department at McGill University, and Louise Mercier, a conference interpreter. She grew up in the Montreal neighbourhood of Notre-Dame-de-Grâce with three brothers. She speaks English and French. Her family is of French Canadian and Irish descent.

Paré's father was an actor and drama teacher who toured with a theatre company, and her mother acted in amateur productions; her uncle Paul was a comedian with the sketch comedy troupe Radio Free Vestibule. Paré watched her father at rehearsals as a child and became interested in acting while helping him learn his lines for a production of The Tempest.

Her relatives include great-grandfather Al Paré and great-great-uncles Noah and Henry Timmins. 18th-century Irish dramatist, fiction writer, essayist and actress Elizabeth Griffith is also Paré's ancestor through her son, politician Richard Griffith.

== Education ==
Paré attended Villa Maria, a private Catholic high school in Montreal. She studied drama at TheatreWorks and appeared in over half a dozen amateur theatre productions as a teenager, including roles as Maid Marian in Robin Hood and Lucy in The Lion, the Witch and the Wardrobe.

== Career ==
Paré landed a small role in the television film Bonanno: A Godfather's Story (1999) during her final year in high school, which convinced her to pursue acting as a career. She also had small roles in an episode of the horror television series Big Wolf on Campus and the French film En Vacances (1999). She dropped out of the fine arts program at Montreal's Dawson College and pursued acting for two years. At one point, she worked as a photographer's assistant on automotive photo shoots.

After Paré auditioned for a bit part for the independent film Stardom (2000), director Denys Arcand chose her to star in the film. She played a naive ice hockey player propelled to international stardom as a supermodel. The comedic satire closed the 2000 Cannes Film Festival with mixed reviews from critics. Paré became the Canadian film industry's "it girl" following the film's release. She was also voted one of the 25 Most Beautiful People of 2012, by People magazine.

Paré next starred in Lost and Delirious (2001), a story of two young lovers set in a girls' boarding school. The film debuted to mixed reviews at the Sundance Film Festival, but the performances of Paré and her co-stars Mischa Barton and Piper Perabo were widely praised. Paré appeared in the television miniseries Random Passage (2002), based on a series of award-winning novels by Bernice Morgan. Also that year, she appeared in the television miniseries Napoléon as the emperor's mistress and had a cameo appearance as a pop singer in Deepa Mehta's Bollywood/Hollywood (2002). The following year, she starred in the girl gang thriller film Posers (2003), after which she appeared in the CTV film The Death and Life of Nancy Eaton, in the title role of murdered heiress Nancy Eaton.

Paré made her Hollywood debut in the film Wicker Park (2004). That year, she also starred in the television miniseries Lives of the Saints, was in the mockumentary See This Movie (2004), and had a role in The WB teen drama series Jack & Bobby, about two brothers, one whom grows up to be the President of the United States; Paré's character grows up to be the First Lady.

Paré shot the CBS pilot Protect and Serve in 2007, co-starred in the independent French-Canadian romantic comedy Jusqu'à toi, and had a small role in The Trotsky (2009), a comedy filmed in Montreal.

She filmed Suck (2008), a vampire horror-comedy written and directed by Rob Stefaniuk, for which role she learned to play the bass guitar. Suck premiered at the 2009 Toronto International Film Festival as part of the Contemporary World Cinema programme. Paré was nominated for a 2010 Canadian Comedy Award for best female performance in film for the role.

Paré played a groupie in the comedy film Hot Tub Time Machine (2010). That year, she also appeared in the Canadian comedy Peepers, about pleasures in voyeurism. Peepers competed in the Just for Laughs film festival in Montreal in July 2010.

Also in 2010, Paré joined the cast of the AMC television series Mad Men, playing Don Draper's second wife, Megan Calvet. Paré's character had a prominent role in the Season 5 opener of Mad Men, in which she danced and sang a version of the 1960 Gillian Hills hit "Zou Bisou Bisou". Her recording of the song was subsequently released as a download and on vinyl.

In 2011, Paré appeared in Beholder. The short film, directed by Nisha Ganatra, premiered as part of the ITVS/PBS series FutureStates. She also starred in The Mountie (also known as The Way of the West, and filmed under the working title of Red Coat Justice in 2009), a western about the North-West Mounted Police, filmed in a remote location outside of Whitehorse, Yukon, and in the comedic short Sorry, Rabbi, directed by Mark Slutsky.

In 2012, Paré appeared on stage with The Jesus and Mary Chain, singing "Just Like Honey", for two concerts in Buffalo, New York and Toronto. That same year, she filmed the romantic comedy, Standby, in Luxembourg and Ireland; she plays the female lead, Alice. It was released in 2014.

In 2017, Paré was added to the main cast of the CBS television series SEAL Team as Amanda Ellis, the team's CIA liaison. The series was renewed for a fourth season in 2020.

== Personal life ==
Paré married writer and producer Joseph M. Smith in 2007. They divorced in 2010.

In 2013, she began dating musician John Kastner. Subsequently she gave birth to their son.

Paré is Catholic. She identifies as a feminist, telling Fashion magazine, "Of course I'm a feminist... If you're not for the equal treatment of men and women, then you're a fascist."

== Filmography ==
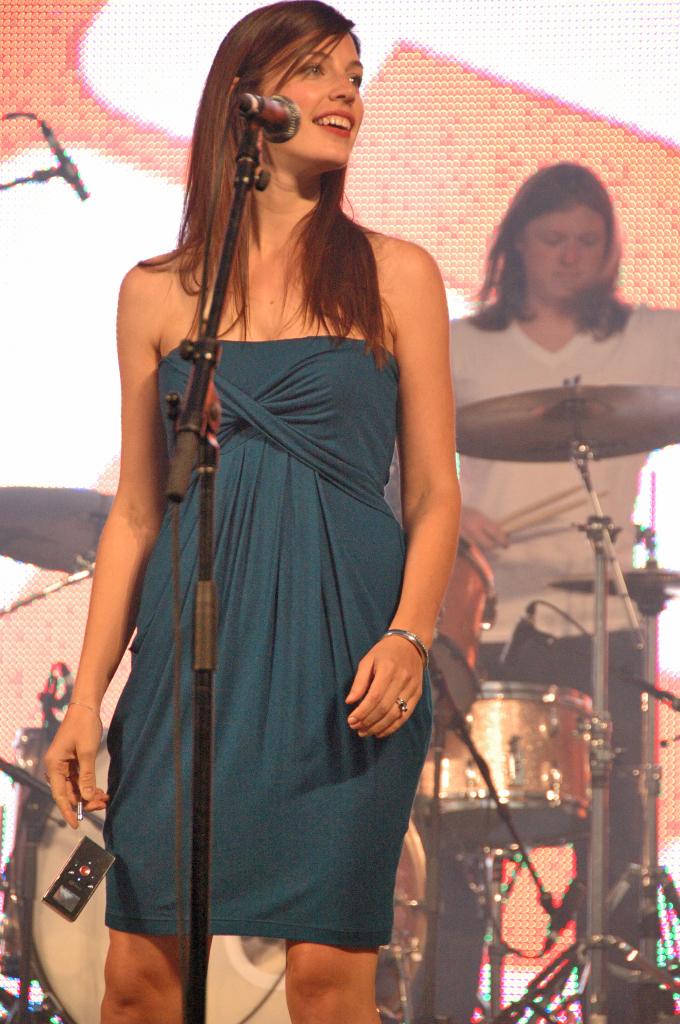
Paré in September 2009

=== Film ===
Year	Title	Role	Notes
2000	Stardom	Tina Menzhal	
2000	Holiday	Carole	
2000	Possible Worlds	Party Guest #1	
2001	Lost and Delirious	Victoria "Tori" Moller	
2002	Bollywood/Hollywood	Kimberly	
2002	Posers	Adria	
2004	See This Movie	Samantha Brown	
2004	Wicker Park	Rebecca Martin	
2009	Jusqu'à toi	Liza	
2009	The Trotsky	Laura	
2009	Suck	Jennifer	Nominated – Canadian Comedy Award for Best Performance by a Female - Film
2010	Hot Tub Time Machine	Tara	
2010	Peepers	Helen	
2011	Sorry, Rabbi	Marie-Helene	Short film
2011	Beholder	Sasha	Short film
2011	The Mountie	Amethyst	
2013	Standby	Alice	
2015	Brooklyn	Miss Fortini	
2016	Lovesick	Lauren	
2018	Another Kind of Wedding	Carrie	
2020	Death of a Ladies' Man	Charlotte	
2025	The Bearded Girl	Lady Andre	

=== Television ===
Year	Title	Role	Notes
1990	The Baby-Sitters Club	Kathi	Episode: "Mary Anne and the Brunettes"
1999	Big Wolf on Campus	Tanya	Episode: "Time and Again"
1999	Bonanno: A Godfather's Story	Rosalie Profaci	Television film
2002	Napoléon	Eleanore Denuelle	Episode: "1800-1807"
2002	Random Passage	Annie Vincent (age 15)	Miniseries
2003	The Death and Life of Nancy Eaton	Nancy Eaton	Television film
2004	Lives of the Saints	Rita Amherst	Television film
2004–2005	Jack & Bobby	Courtney Benedict	21 episodes
2007	Life	Julia	Episode: "The Fallen Woman"
2007	Protect and Serve	Hope Cook	Television film
2010–2015	Mad Men	Megan Calvet Draper	43 episodes
2013	Satisfaction	Robin	Episode: "First Contact"
2014	Robot Chicken	Kristy Thomas, Betty Ann (voice)	Episode: "Panthropologie"
2016	The Interestings	Ash Wolf	Pilot
2017–2024	SEAL Team	Officer Amanda "Mandy" Ellis	Main cast
2018	Six	Tattoo Artist	Episode: "Danger Close"
2019	Star vs. the Forces of Evil	Chloe (voice)	Episode: "Britta's Tacos"
2019	Big Hero 6: The Series	Celine Simard / Sirque (voice)	Episode: "Portal Enemy"
2021	Atypical	Honey	Episode: "Dessert at Olive Garden"
2021	The Simpsons	Collette (voice)	Episode: "A Serious Flanders"
2026	Crew Girl	Ella	Main Cast

== Discography ==
- "Zou Bisou Bisou" – single – music download, vinyl special edition – released March 26, 2012
