= Grip (album) =

Studio album by Serpentwithfeet
- Released: February 16, 2024
- Genres: Pop; R&B
- Length: 29:10
- Label: Secretly Canadian
- Producers: I Like That; Nosaj Thing; Stwo; ThankGod4Cody

Serpentwithfeet chronology
| Deacon's Grove (2021) | Grip (2024) |

Singles from Grip
- 1. "Damn Gloves" Released: October 23, 2023; 2. "Safe Word" Released: January 10, 2024; 3. "Ellipsis" Released: February 13, 2024

Singles from Grip Sequel
- 1. "Writhing in the Wind" Released: January 19, 2025; 2. "Wanderer" Released: February 6, 2025

Grip is the third studio album by American singer and songwriter Serpentwithfeet, released on February 16, 2024, through Secretly Canadian. It was primarily produced by I Like That, with additional production from Mike Irish, and features collaborations with Ty Dolla Sign, Mick Jenkins, Orion Sun, and Yanga YaYa. The album received positive reviews from critics.

== Background ==
On October 23, 2023, Serpentwithfeet announced his third studio album, titled Grip. He also announced the album's track list and lead single, "Damn Gloves" featuring Ty Dolla Sign and Yanga YaYa. He released the album's second single, "Safe Word", on January 10, 2024. The album's third single, "Ellipsis" featuring Orion Sun, was released on February 13, 2024.

== Critical reception ==
Professional ratings
Aggregate scores
| Source | Rating |
|---|---|
| AnyDecentMusic? | 7.1/10 |
| Metacritic | 76/100 |
Review scores
| Source | Rating |
| Clash | 8/10 |
| DIY | 4/5 stars |
| Exclaim! | 8/10 |
| The Line of Best Fit | 6/10 |
| Paste | 8.2/10 |
| Pitchfork | 7.7/10 |

Grip received a score of 76 out of 100 on review aggregator Metacritic based on seven critics' reviews, indicating "generally favorable" reception. Maddy Smith of DIY opined that it "offers a 360 trajectory into romance, acceptance and optimism", calling it "a transformation to deliciously, bracingly unabashed pop" that is "oozing with infectious melodies, tempered production and lashes of sex appeal". Exclaim!'s Ian Gormely found it to be an example of "post-pandemic pop music", describing it as "more than just a showcase for the return of Black queer spaces. It's a celebration of the relationships—passionate, platonic, lasting, fleeting, loving, lustful—that these spaces foster".

Paste's Elizabeth Braaten stated that the album "build[s] on the joyful portrayal of gospel and Black queer love showcased on Deacon, with kinetic instrumentals that harken back to early-aughts R&B". Reviewing the album for DIY, Sarah Taylor commented that Grip "finds serpent much more content, cherishing small moments of physical closeness without becoming sentimental or saccharine" and is "a dynamic and sensual album, rich with imagery". Noah Barker of The Line of Best Fit wrote that while "stylish and moving", the album "lacks a sense of provocation" and "if given the chance, it may groove you to tears, if only for a moment of great release". Stephen Kearse of Pitchfork felt that Grip "trades the gnostic gospel of the singer and producer's past music for saucy R&B" and that his "songwriting is punchier and more direct in this purist mode".

== Track listing ==
Grip track listing
| No. | Title | Writer(s) | Length |
|---|---|---|---|
| 1. | "Damn Gloves" (featuring Ty Dolla Sign and Yanga YaYa) | Josiah Wise; Blair Simms; Tyrone Griffin Jr.; Yanga Madlala | 2:31 |
| 2. | "Safe Word" | Wise | 2:46 |
| 3. | "Spades" | Wise; Sensei Bueno | 3:25 |
| 4. | "Deep End" | Wise | 2:46 |
| 5. | "Rum / Throwback" | Wise | 3:41 |
| 6. | "Black Air Force" (featuring Mick Jenkins) | Wise; Mick Jenkins | 2:48 |
| 7. | "Hummin'" | Wise | 2:54 |
| 8. | "Ellipsis" (featuring Orion Sun) | Wise; Orion Sun | 3:21 |
| 9. | "Lucky Me" | Wise | 2:27 |
| 10. | "1 to 10" | Wise | 2:31 |
| Total length: | | | 29:10 |

Grip Sequel track listing
| No. | Title | Writer(s) | Length |
|---|---|---|---|
| 1. | "Beg Quietly" | Wise | 2:34 |
| 2. | "Pillow Talk" | Wise | 3:36 |
| 3. | "Chapter & Vers" | Wise | 2:42 |
| 4. | "Seagull" (featuring Mick Jenkins) | Wise; Jenkins | 2:42 |
| 5. | "Writhing in the Wind" | Wise | 1:25 |
| 6. | "Wanderer" | Wise | 4:21 |
| 7. | "Lucky Me (Strings)" (featuring Good Girl) | Wise | 2:48 |
| 8. | "Spades (Remix)" (with Ogi featuring Destin Conrad) | Wise | 3:19 |
| 9. | "Damn Gloves (Baile Funk Remix)" (featuring Ty Dolla Sign and Azzy) | Wise | 2:13 |
| 10. | "Damn Gloves" (featuring Ty Dolla Sign and Yanga YaYa) | Wise; Simms; Madlala | 2:31 |
| 11. | "Safe Word" | Wise | 2:46 |
| 12. | "Spades" | Wise; Bueno | 3:25 |
| 13. | "Deep End" | Wise | 2:46 |
| 14. | "Rum / Throwback" | Wise | 3:41 |
| 15. | "Black Air Force" (featuring Mick Jenkins) | Wise; Jenkins | 2:48 |
| 16. | "Hummin'" | Wise | 2:54 |
| 17. | "Ellipsis" (featuring Orion Sun) | Wise; Sun | 3:21 |
| 18. | "Lucky Me" | Wise | 2:27 |
| 19. | "1 to 10" | Wise | 2:31 |
| Total length: | | | 54:53 |

== Personnel ==
- Serpentwithfeet – vocals, composition
- I Like That – producer (all except 8)
- Mike Irish – additional production (all except 8), mastering (track 2)
- Erick Bardales – additional production (track 4)
- Mick Jenkins – vocals and composition (track 6)
- Nosaj Thing – producer (track 1 and 7)
- Orion Sun – vocals and composition (track 8)
- Stwo – producer (track 7)
- ThankGod4Cody – producer (track 8)
- Ty Dolla Sign – vocals and composition (track 1)
- Yanga YaYa – vocals and composition (track 1)
