= Catherine Perry =

Catherine Perry may refer to:

- Catherine Joy Perry (born 1985), U.S. female pro-wrestler, with the stagename Lana
- Catherine D. Perry (born 1952), U.S. judge

== See also ==
- Katherine Perry (1897–1983), U.S. actress
- Katie Perry (born 1980), Australian fashion designer
- Katy Perry (born 1984), U.S. singer
- Perry (disambiguation)
