= Courage in Red =

- Courage in Red promotional poster
- Written by: Marie-Josée Houle; Laurie-Anne Smith; Katie Tallo; Matt West
- Directed by: Colin McKeown; Marie-Josée Houle; Laurie-Anne Smith; Katie Tallo; Matt West
- Country of origin: Canada
- Original languages: English; French
- No. of episodes: 13

Production
- Executive producer: Colin McKeown
- Producer: Jessica Webb
- Editor: Matt West
- Running time: 30 minutes
- Production company: JenCor Entertainment

Original release
- Network: OLN
- Release: November 1, 2009

Courage in Red is a 13-part television documentary that details many aspects of crime that the Royal Canadian Mounted Police must contend with on a daily basis. Each 30 minute episode focused on a certain aspect of the RCMP such as training at the RCMP Academy, Depot Division in Regina, frontline police work, the Emergency Response Team, canine unit, and VIP protection among others.

The show aired on OLN from November 1 to December 13, 2009 and aired on SCN from February 23 to May 21, 2010.

== Episodes ==
| Episode | Description |
|---|---|
| 1 - Summit | With 66 countries in attendance, the Summit Francophone hosted the largest deployment of foreign dignitaries in Canadian history. With big crowds come big risks: biological, chemical and explosive threats are just a few of the many scenarios that the RCMP must prepare for. Security must be air-tight. With the Vancouver Olympics approaching, the stakes are high for Supt. Jacques Tanguay's last mission. The summit will also provide Jacques with his first and only opportunity to have his son under his command- an emotional experience. |
| 2 - VIP Training | When a dignitary visits Canada their safety is the ultimate responsibility of the RCMP. Cpl Bill Demeau is the head instructor for the National V.I.P. course, it's his job to make sure that those training to join don't forget it. The training is tough, intense, merciless, it has to be. These Mounties must be prepared for any situation, to put their lives on the line...even take a bullet. |
| 3 - Customs and Excise | On any given night, if you are listening, you will hear gun-fire in Cornwall. These are warning shots from brazen smugglers, telling the people of the community that they mean business. Everyone is fearful except for the RCMPs Sgt. Michael Harvey and his team. They're ready for these criminals and make a daily job of standing in their way. |
| 4 - Depot | Since 1885 every RCMP officer in Canada has gone through Depot in Regina, Saskatchewan. It is an incredibly grueling program that teaches respect, honor and discipline. Kevin Marion is 24 years old and will be going to Depot to realize his goal of becoming a Mountie. With hard work and a bit of luck, his father Al, a 28-year RCMP veteran will present him with his badge at the end of the 24-week program. But sometimes wanting it doesn't always mean you get it. |
| 5 - Remote Policing | One of the most unusual things about the RCMP is that they serve very remote, northern communities. This sets them apart from any other policing service in Canada. The remote experience is one that is all about commitment and extremes - extremes in temperatures, culture and working conditions. For some it's just a job, but for others, it becomes their way of life. |
| 6 - ERT | The Emergency Response Team is a group of highly trained RCMP members capable of employing specialized weapons, equipment, and tactics to resolve extremely high-risk situations. For the first time cameras have been allowed to record some of these tactical procedures and scenarios. From boarding vessels in the Pacific Ocean at high speeds to rescue operations for a hostage in a remote part of Manitoba, this is a glimpse into what ERT does on a daily basis. |
| 7 - Peace Ops | In the 21st century, crime no longer respects borders. Under the RCMPs International Peace Operations Branch, Canadian Police Officers are serving on peace missions in a dozen countries around the world. A new contingent of Canadian officers has just landed in Haiti, the poorest country in the Western hemisphere. There they will be faced with extreme poverty, heat and civil unrest. |
| 8 - West Coast Marine | There is no such thing as a typical day for the West Coast Marine Service, the force policing the coastline from Washington to Alaska. This episode follows a crew of the RCMPs specialized boat cops as they patrol the coast and deal with the intense and often bizarre situations they run into on a daily basis. From rescues at sea to stopping crime, this unit does it all. |
| 9 - Frontline Policing | Frontline policing is the heart and soul of what the RCMP does every day and every night. From their home bases in over 750 detachments, they hit the streets in cruisers or on foot in an effort to maintain peace and order across the country. Round the clock, meet the officers who call the streets their home. |
| 10 - SAFE | In recent years high school and university shootings have become a sad reality. Kids are getting killed. Parents want their kids to be safe at school and the RCMP is responding. They've developed a comprehensive strategy known as SAFE. When seconds can cost lives, this new plan provides crucial information to Mounties as they arrive on scene. |
| 11 - K9 | For a police dog and his handler every day on the job is different, unpredictable and guaranteed to be interesting. This episode takes us to the West coast where we get to follow an experienced team on their patrols, get an intimate view of the relationship between dog and handler, and witness the unique situations they encounter every day. We also visit the Police Dog Services Training Centre in Alberta where these canine heroes are bred and trained. |
| 12 - Clan Labs | Meth and Ecstasy; two of the most popular and dangerous synthetic drugs on the planet. It's a deadly billion-dollar industry in Canada and it's linked to gangs and organized crime. These drugs devastate communities and destroy lives. Watch as the RCMP locates, targets and takes down the Clan Labs that are destroying our country's future. |
| 13 - Youth Programs | Police officers are in a unique position to play an important role in the lives of youth. Constables Lois Cormier and Earl Woods are devoted to working with youth and making a huge difference in their communities. Lois is a Community Relations Officer in Thompson, Manitoba, working to stem gang violence and chronic drug abuse. Earl Woods is a School Resource Officer in Souris, PEI. His influence has been profound in reducing youth crime in his community. Whether it's dealing with victims, offenders, parents or advisors, these exceptional stories of dedication reflect the RCMPs desire to connect with and relate to youth. |
