= Deacon (album) =

Studio album by Serpentwithfeet
- Released: March 26, 2021
- Genre: R&B
- Length: 29:09
- Label: Secretly Canadian
- Producers: Serpentwithfeet; Batu; Brandon Juhans; Lil Silva; Sampha; Take a Daytrip; Justus West

Serpentwithfeet chronology
| Apparition (2020) | Deacon (2021) | Deacon's Grove (2021) |

Singles from Deacon
- 1. "Fellowship" Released: January 25, 2021; 2. "Same Size Shoe" Released: February 17, 2021; 3. "Heart Storm" Released: March 23, 2021

Deacon (stylized in all caps) is the second studio album by American singer and songwriter Serpentwithfeet. It was released on March 26, 2021, by Secretly Canadian.

== Background and release ==
A year after the release of Serpentwithfeet's debut studio album Soil (2018), he released a single titled "Receipts" with singer and rapper Ty Dolla Sign. They further worked on the latter's album Featuring Ty Dolla Sign (2020), with the single "Ego Death" along with rapper Kanye West, singer-songwriter FKA Twigs, and record producer Skrillex. Serpentwithfeet also contributed his vocals on "Serpentwithfeet Interlude" on the same album. On the same year, he released an extended play titled Apparition on April 30.

On January 25, 2021, Serpentwithfeet announced the release date of the album alongside the single "Fellowship", co-produced by musicians Sampha and Lil Silva. He released the second single titled "Same Size Shoe" on February 17, 2021. Three days prior to the album release, he released the third single, "Heart Storm", a collaboration with singer Nao.

== Critical reception ==
Professional ratings
Aggregate scores
| Source | Rating |
|---|---|
| AnyDecentMusic? | 8.0/10 |
| Metacritic | 86/100 |
Review scores
| Source | Rating |
| AllMusic | 4/5 stars |
| Clash | 9/10 |
| Consequence of Sound | A− |
| DIY | 4/5 stars |
| Entertainment Weekly | A− |
| The Independent | 5/5 stars |
| NME | 4/5 stars |
| The Observer | 4/5 stars |
| Pitchfork | 7.7/10 |
| Rolling Stone | 4/5 stars |

Deacon received rave reviews from contemporary music critics. At Metacritic, which assigns a normalised rating out of 100 from reviews from mainstream critics, the album received a score of 86, based on 15 reviews, indicating "universal acclaim". Aggregator AnyDecentMusic? gave it 8.0 out of 10, based on their assessment of the critical consensus.

Rachel Brodsky of The Independent gave the album a perfect score and described it as a "a stunning celebration of black, gay love. [...] It is also a groundbreaking proclamation of personal acceptance." Laura Dzubay at Consequence of Sound gave the album an A−, described it as a "bountiful collage of love and care." Shahzaib Hussain of Clash gave it 9 out of 10, deemed it as an "early contender for Album of the Year" then described Deacon as a "triumph". He further stated that "it realizes and relives love's quiet, archived moments, be it romantic or spiritual." Ross Horton of The Line of Best Fit called it "blood-red" and "heart-bursting", further stated that it is "quite clearly, a complex, rich and elegant collection that points at one very simple truth: love is central to a life well lived." Heather Phares of AllMusic compared the album to Serpentwithfeet's previous releases and called it more "soothing and fulfilling". Phares stated that Serpentwithfeet "transforms into a beautiful, fully realized work of art for his audience to savor." El Hunt of NME gave it a four out of five stars and called it "a meticulous excavation of heartbreak". Ben Tipple of DIY gave the album four out of five stars and called the album "looks for hope in love, much like in the spirituality that birthed it." Claire Shaffer of Rolling Stone gave the album four out of five stars and praised the "cheekiness and humor" of it. Shaffer described the album as a "party record for people partying alone in their living room." Adlan Jackson at Pitchfork rated the album 7.7 out of 10, saying that the album "could use a few more awe-inspiring moments, but by celebrating simplicity, it enshrines the Black, queer love at its center as something blessedly uncomplicated and precious."

In June 2021, Billboard named the album among the best 15 albums released by LGBTQ artists so far in 2021.

=== Accolades ===
Deacon on year-end lists
| Publication | List | Rank | Ref. |
|---|---|---|---|
| Paste | The 50 Best Albums of 2021 | 14 | |

== Track listing ==
All tracks are written by Josiah Wise, except where noted.

Deacon track listing
| No. | Title | Writer(s) | Producer(s) | Length |
|---|---|---|---|---|
| 1. | "Hyacinth" | | serpentwithfeet; Justus West; Batu | 3:19 |
| 2. | "Same Size Shoe" | | Brandon Juhans; serpentwithfeet; Batu | 3:30 |
| 3. | "Malik" | | Juhans; serpentwithfeet | 1:24 |
| 4. | "Amir" | Wise; Tyrone Jermaine "TJ" Carter; Sampha Sisay | serpentwithfeet; Lil Silva; Sampha | 2:56 |
| 5. | "Dawn" | | serpentwithfeet | 0:33 |
| 6. | "Sailors' Superstition" | Wise; Denzel Baptiste; David Biral | Take a Daytrip | 2:56 |
| 7. | "Heart Storm" (with Nao) | Wise; Neo Jessica Joshua | serpentwithfeet; West | 3:13 |
| 8. | "Wood Boy" | Wise; Carter; Sisay | serpentwithfeet; Lil Silva; Sampha | 2:44 |
| 9. | "Derrick's Beard" | | serpentwithfeet | 1:38 |
| 10. | "Old & Fine" | | Juhans; serpentwithfeet; Batu | 3:13 |
| 11. | "Fellowship" | Wise; Carter; Sisay | serpentwithfeet; Lil Silva; Sampha | 3:39 |
| Total length: | | | | 29:09 |
