= Katie Gately (EP) =

EP by Katie Gately
- Released: September 2, 2013
- Genre: Electronic music
- Length: 21:57
- Language: English
- Label: Public Information

Katie Gately chronology
Katie Gately (2013)	Color (2016)

Katie Gately is the debut extended play by American electronic musician Katie Gately, released by Public Information on September 2, 2013. It has received positive reviews from critics.

== Reception ==
In Fact, Angus Finlayson called this release "highly ambitious in construction" and that Gately "shows considerable promise", but criticizes that "at points [the songs] suffer from a lack of mixing finesse". Writing for Resident Advisor, Maya Kaley compares this work to Holly Herndon and writes that the songs "swill around with their own curious internal logic, pointing to a preoccupation with sound itself".

== Track listing ==
All songs written by Katie Gately.

1. "Ice" – 3:09
2. "Last Day" – 4:09
3. "Stings" – 4:08
4. "Dead Referee" – 4:47
5. "Left Half" – 2:21
6. "Stems" – 3:23

== Personnel ==
- Katie Gately – music, mixing
- Austin Irving – cover artwork

== See also ==
- List of 2013 albums
