= George Buza =

Canadian actor

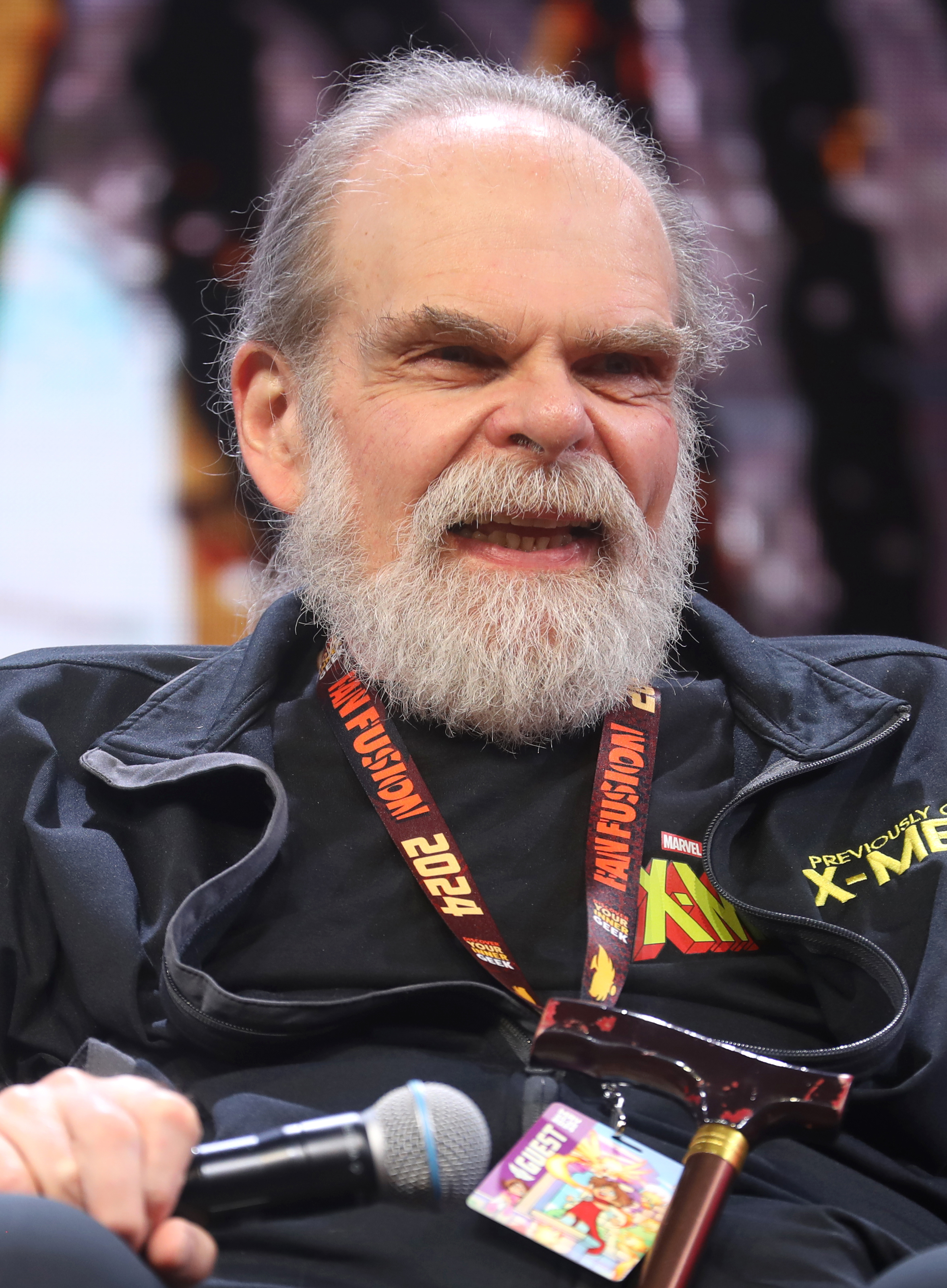
- Buza in 2024
- Born: George Buza Jr. Cleveland, Ohio, U.S.
- Other name: George Busa
- Citizenship: United States; Canada
- Occupation: Actor
- Years active: 1975–present

George Buza Jr. is an American-Canadian-British actor who is best known for voicing Beast (Dr. Hank McCoy) in X-Men: The Animated Series and X-Men '97.

== Early life ==
Buza was born in Cleveland, Ohio, United States to Ildiko (née Ormai), an opera singer and George Buza Sr.. He moved to Toronto, Ontario, Canada, as a young man and became a Canadian citizen in 1998.

== Career ==
Buza played Turner Edison on Maniac Mansion for the entirety of its 1991–1993 run on YTV and The Family Channel. He also had a recurring role on the Red Green Show as Dwight Cardiff, the extremely lazy marina operator. He appeared as Chief Jake McKenna several times in the TV series Honey, I Shrunk the Kids: The TV Show. In addition, he portrayed Doubar, the older brother of Sinbad, in The Adventures of Sinbad syndicated TV series, as well as a recurring role on the syndicated Mutant X. Buza was also in episode 11 of TVOntario's Read All About It!, and played Buck Norris on The Strain. He was one of the Kzamm tribe in Quest for Fire.

He also makes a small appearance as a trucker in 2000's X-Men movie, and a biker in George Romero's Diary of the Dead. He played Stuckmore in 2002's Men with Brooms. Buza also played Lenny "The Brain" Lepinski in the Quebec-Ontario TV show called The Last Chapter. He also played Santa, the character that fought Krampus in the horror movie A Christmas Horror Story.

=== Voiceover work ===
Buza is known for voicing Beast in X-Men: The Animated Series. He was the only voice actor out of the main leads who was familiar with the comic prior to being cast. He also reprised the role in the video games X-Men: Children of the Atom and both X-Men: Mutant Academy games.

Buza has also provided character voices in many animated series. He voiced Grandpa Granger in the English dub of Beyblade, Chief Chirpa on Star Wars: Ewoks, and additional roles in Star Wars: Droids, The Busy World of Richard Scarry, Mythic Warriors: Guardians of the Legend, The Neverending Story, Babar, Hammerman, Jayce and the Wheeled Warriors, Grossology, Iggy Arbuckle, Dog City, Pecola, Monster Force, Franny's Feet, Starlink: Battle for Atlas and Tales from the Cryptkeeper.

He also provided his voice in the English dubs of the Medabots and Power Stone video games.

== Filmography ==
=== Film ===
- High-Ballin' (1978) - Warehouseman
- Fast Company (1979) - Meatball
- The Amateur (1981) - Terrorist #4
- Quest for Fire (1981) - The Kzamm Tribe
- Highpoint (1982) - Alex
- Martin's Day (1985) - Prison Guard 1
- Meatballs III: Summer Job (1986) - Mean Gene
- Busted Up (1986) - Captain Hook
- The Last Season (1986) - Patterson
- Oklahoma Smugglers (1987) - Hugo
- Sticky Fingers (1988) - Policeman
- The Brain (1988) - Varna
- Destiny to Order (1989) - Burgundy Red
- Snake Eater II: The Drug Buster (1989) - Rico
- Stella (1990) - George
- Straight Line (1990) - Big Boy
- Open Season (1995) - Orly Travis
- Pocahontas: The Legend (1995) - Jules
- The Michelle Apts. (1995) - Burt
- Henry & Verlin (1996) - Butch
- Shoemaker (1996) - Jerry
- The Arrangement (1999) - Willy Morton
- X-Men (2000) - Trucker
- Knockaround Guys (2001) - Earl at the Gun Shop
- Men with Brooms (2002) - Stuckmore
- Duct Tape Forever (2002) - Motel Manager
- Cold Creek Manor (2003) - Antique Dealer
- Still Small Voices (2007) - Wife Beater Terrance Reed
- Diary of the Dead (2007) - Tattooed Biker
- Production Office (2008) - Big John
- Camille (2008) - Motel Manager
- You Might as Well Live (2009) - Bartender
- The Mountie (2011) - Kleus
- A Little Bit Zombie (2012) - Capt'n Cletus
- Fish N Chips: The Movie (2013) - Chipsus Barbotus / The Admiral (voice)
- The Christmas Switch (2014) - Burly Man
- A Christmas Horror Story (2015) - Santa Claus / Norman
- Mean Dreams (2016) - Pawnshop Clerk
- Elliot the Littlest Reindeer (2018) - Santa Claus (voice)

=== Television ===
- Read All About It! (1980) – Barry
- The Littlest Hobo (1984) – Security Guard, Charlie Demerest
- Star Wars: Droids (1985) – (voice)
- Star Wars: Ewoks (1985) – Chief Chirpa (voice)
- Maniac Mansion (1990–93) – Turner Edison
- Raider of the South Seas (1991) – The Raider
- X-Men Animated Series (1992–97) – Beast (Dr. Henry "Hank" McCoy) / Additional voices (voice)
- Tales from the Cryptkeeper (1993–94) – William / Mr. Armstrong (voice)
- Dog City (1994) – Steven (voice)
- Spider-Man: The Animated Series (1995) – Beast (voice)
- The Neverending Story (1995–96) – Ogre / East Wind
- The Adventures of Sinbad (1996–98) – Doubar
- Mythic Warriors: Guardians of the Legend (1998–99) – King Minos / Gorgus (voice)
- Power Stone (1999) – Kraken (voice, English dub)
- Monster by Mistake (1999) – Kragon (voice)
- Noddy (2000) – Gus the Garbage Truck Driver
- Beyblade (2001–05) – Grandpa Granger (voice, English dub)
- Pecola (2001–02) – Rory (voice, English dub)
- The Last Chapter (2002–03) – Lenny "The Brain" Lenpiski
- Franny's Feet (2004–05) – Grandpa (voice)
- Grossology (2006–07) – Sloppy Joe / Frankenbooger (voice)
- Fear Itself (2009) - Crane Dougale (episode 9 titled "Something with Bite").
- Sidekick (2010) – Sheriff Marshall (voice)
- The Case for Christmas (2011) – Kris Kringle (Santa Claus)
- Elinor Wonders Why (2020) – Grandpa Rabbit / Baba (voice)
- X-Men '97 (2024–present) – Beast (Dr. Henry "Hank" McCoy) (voice)

=== Video games ===
- X-Men: Children of the Atom (1994) – Announcer / Colossus / Juggernaut / Omega Red / Magneto
- Marvel vs. Capcom 2: New Age of Heroes (2000) – Colossus
- X-Men: Mutant Academy 2 (2001) – Beast
- Starlink: Battle for Atlas (2018) – Kharl Zeon

== Awards and nominations ==
In 1992, he was nominated for a Gemini Award for Best Performance in a Comedy Program or Series (Individual or Ensemble) for Maniac Mansion. He was nominated again in 2001 for Best Ensemble Performance in a Comedy Program or Series for The Red Green Show.
