= Fawn / Brute =

Studio album by Katie Gately
- Released: March 31, 2023
- Genre: Electronic music
- Length: 48:52
- Language: English
- Label: Houndstooth

Katie Gately chronology
Loom (2020)	Fawn / Brute (2023)

Fawn / Brute is the third full-length studio album by American electronic musician Katie Gately, released by Houndstooth Records on March 31, 2023. It has received positive reviews from critics.

== Reception ==
Professional ratings
Aggregate scores
Source	Rating
Metacritic	77/100 (4 reviews)
Review scores
Source	Rating
AllMusic	4/5 stars
The Guardian	3/5 stars
musicOMH	3.5/5 stars

Fawn / Brute received positive reviews from critics noted at review aggregator Metacritic. It has a weighted average score of 77 out of 100, based on four reviews.

Editors at AllMusic rated this album 4 out of 5 stars, with critic Heather Phares writing that "Gately's meditations on mothers and daughters, and bodies creating and betraying, are fascinating, and Fawn/Brute's expressions of the darker corners of childhood and motherhood might be even more revealing than more conventional musical memoirs". At online music retailer Bandcamp, this was the Album of the Day and reviewer Joe Muggs wrote that "there's something about the ambition, the confrontation, the refusal of any false duality between pop and avant-garde, and particularly that sense of decades and even centuries of culture bubbling up through the cracks, that feels regally assured in a similar way" and "this is a record of spectacular scope, one that signals vast possibilities". Jazz Monroe of The Guardian rated this release 3 out of 5 stars, calling this music "electro mini operas that whip up a maelstrom of dislocated voices, honking saxophone and roughshod, junkyard-style percussion". For musicOMH, Steven Johnson gave Fawn / Brute 3.5 out of 5 stars, calling it "a cohesive and impactful listen, with a burgeoning sense of ambition and individuality shining through" and cautioning that "the album's more maximalist aesthetic may bring challenges for the casual listener". Both The Quietus and Stereogum chose this as album of the week. In the former, Irina Shtreis writes that Gately's musical approach continues to evolve: "familiar single-syllable titles, also present on the first two albums, correspond with a punchy sound, balancing between trip-hop, techno, experimental electronica and hypnotising folk" and writes that "with this magpie approach, the musician makes a very individual puzzle of sounds". In the latter, James Rettig characterizes this release as "bedtime stories and nursery rhymes that are mischievous and dark-sided".

Editors at AllMusic included this on their list of favorite electronic albums of 2023.

== Track listing ==
All songs written by Katie Gately.

Fawn

1. "Seed" – 2:50
2. "Howl" – 3:40
3. "Fawn" – 4:19
4. "Cleave" – 4:25
5. "Peeve" – 4:28
6. "Scale" – 4:45

Brute

7. "Meat" – 5:07
8. "Brute" – 4:10
9. "Chaw" – 4:56
10. "Tame" – 5:08
11. "Melt" – 5:05

== Personnel ==
- Katie Gately – music, mixing, production
- Jason Agel – mixing
- Matt Colton – mastering

== See also ==
- List of 2023 albums
