= Loom (Katie Gately album) =

Studio album by Katie Gately
- Released: February 14, 2020
- Genres: Avant-pop; electronic music
- Length: 41:29
- Language: English
- Label: Houndstooth
- Producer: Katie Gately

Katie Gately chronology
Color (2016)	Loom (2020)	Fawn / Brute (2023)

Loom is the second full-length studio album by American electronic musician Katie Gately, released by Houndstooth Records on February 14, 2020. It has received positive reviews from critics.

== Reception ==
Professional ratings
Aggregate scores
Source	Rating
AnyDecentMusic?	7.4/10 (8 reviews)
Metacritic	85/100 (10 reviews)
Review scores
Source	Rating
AllMusic	4.5/5 stars
Exclaim!	8/10
Financial Times	4/5 stars
The Guardian	3/5 stars
Loud and Quiet	8/10
MusicOMH	4/5 stars
Paste	7.9/10
Pitchfork	8.8/10
The Sydney Morning Herald	3.5/5 stars

Editors at AnyDecentMusic? rated this album a 7.4 out of 10, based on eight reviews. Loom received positive reviews from critics noted at review aggregator Metacritic. It has a weighted average score of 85 out of 100, based on 10 reviews.

Editors at AllMusic rated this album 4.5 out of 5 stars, with critic Heather Phares writing that it is a "stunning achievement" to "uncompromising music" that "engulfs" listeners in the experience of Gately's grief at her mother's death; the website also chose this as one of the Best Albums of 2020, calling it a "painful, beautiful, and powerful". In Exclaim!, Angela Morrison gave Loom an 8 out of 10, calling it "a swirling mix of eerie atmosphere, devastating emotion and brilliant sonic abstraction" and "Gately's best work yet". Ludovic Hunter-Tilney of Financial Times rated Loom 4 out of 5 stars for "Gately’s adeptness at contrasting light and shade [which] prevents the results from becoming dismally dark". Ben Beaumont-Thomas of The Guardian characterizes this music as "nightmarish orchestrated despair" and "an industrial-era Bosch painting turned into music"; he gave it 3 out of 5 stars. In Loud and Quiet, Dafydd Jenkins rated this release 8 out of 10, calling it "an album that demands to be heard, if only once in its entirety, so all-encompassing its theatricality seems".

Ben Devlin of musicOMH calls Loom "an intense record, full of feelings of loss, confusion and angst" and "an early contender for best electronic album of the year" that he gave 4 out of 5 stars. Paste's Max Freedman gave Loom a 7.9 out of 10 for Gately's "unusual viewpoints" in exploring grief. With a 7.7 out of 10, Shawn Reynaldo of Pitchfork writes that "the journey [Gately] takes is riveting" and the album's "success lies in the clarity of vision that she has found" in grief. Danijela Bočev of The Quietus wrote that "one of Gately’s greatest assets is the eagerness to creatively confront the dark matter of the psyche, lovingly provoking it out of the shady corners and playfully expose it in full elemental force" and that "crafts unique compositions for scoring the internal psychodrama, keeping ambition in her sound as ever delightfully larger than life". Writing for Resident Advisor, Charlotte Wiedemann tells listeners, "if you've ever dealt with loss, Loom may also speak to you". In The Sydney Morning Herald, Barnaby Smith rated this work 3.5 out of 5 stars, writing that "there is a warmth that Color arguably did not have, largely born of the more prominent, closely-recorded vocals, often layered, as on the choral-influenced 'Allay' and the extraordinary 'Bracer'".

== Track listing ==
All songs written by Katie Gately.

1. "Ritual" – 2:58
2. "Allay" – 4:56
3. "Waltz" – 5:17
4. "Bracer" – 10:32
5. "Rite" – 2:29
6. "Tower" – 6:05
7. "Flow" – 6:13
8. "Rest" – 2:59

== Personnel ==
- Katie Gately – music, mixing, production
- Jason Agel – mixing
- Matt Colton – mastering
- Andrew Kenji Thorpe – artwork

== See also ==
- List of 2020 albums
