= Westword =

Newspaper in Denver, Colorado

- Type: Alternative weekly
- Format: Magazine
- Owner: Voice Media Group
- Publisher: Scott Tobias
- Editor: Patricia Calhoun
- Founded: 1977; 48 years ago
- Headquarters: 1278 Lincoln St, Denver, Colorado, 80203, USA
- Circulation: 67,520 (as of 2014)
- Website: westword.com

Westword is a free digital and print media publication based in Denver, Colorado. Westword publishes daily online coverage of local news, restaurants, music and arts, as well as longform narrative journalism. A weekly print issue circulates every Thursday. Westword has been owned by Voice Media Group since January 2013, when a group of senior executives bought out the previous owners.

Patricia Calhoun has been editor of Westword since she and two of her friends founded the publication in 1977. Calhoun and her former partners sold the newspapers to New Times Media in 1983. In 2005, New Times Media acquired Village Voice Media, and took on the Village Voice Media name as part of a deal that created a group of 14 publications nationwide. In January 2013, former Village Voice Media executives Scott Tobias, Christine Brennan and Jeff Mars bought VVM's papers and associated web properties and formed Voice Media Group.

The publication's website, westword.com, offers daily news coverage along with comprehensive listings of music, arts and other events, along with restaurants and bar listings.

== Best of Denver ==
Every year, Westword's staff awards hundreds of Denver-area personalities, restaurants, bars and shops with its "Best of Denver" awards.

The newspaper also throws a yearly concert, the "Westword Music Showcase", which brings dozens of local bands along with national headlining acts to venues in the Golden Triangle. Westword also produces an annual list of Masterminds, people whose contribution to arts and culture in the Denver area deserve special recognition.

Other live events include Artopia, an annual celebration of the arts, Tacolandia, which features dozens of local taquerias and live music, and Feast, which focuses on the city’s entire food scene.

== David Holthouse article ==
Westword ran a cover story on May 13, 2004, entitled "Stalking the Bogeyman" in which the 33-year-old journalist, David Holthouse, described being raped at the age of 7 by a 14-year-old at his home in Anchorage, Alaska. The attacker was not named but a picture and other details were printed. The article told of Holthouse's recently abandoned plans to belatedly kill his now grown-up attacker: "I was going to watch him writhe like a poisoned cockroach for a few seconds, then kick him onto his stomach and put three bullets in the back of his head. This time last year I had a gun, and a silencer, and a plan".

After the article was published, its author feared retaliation and asked a friend to follow the alleged attacker. The friend was arrested on suspicion of stalking on May 29, 2004. Holthouse's arrest soon followed. "Any charges against me are essentially charges of thought crimes," he said. The alleged attacker and his wife declined to press charges. The article won a 2nd place in the annual awards of the Colorado Society of Professional Journalists. Holthouse's story has since been adapted into a stage play by the same name.

== Marijuana ==
In November 2009 Westword became the first magazine or newspaper worldwide to employ a medical marijuana critic. An anonymous contributor known by the pen name William Breathes contributed regular reviews of local marijuana dispensaries and began a column called "Ask a Stoner". Since that time, Westword has continued to be sympathetic to Colorado's growing recreational and medical marijuana movements, featuring ads for dispensaries in print editions and devoting an entire section of its website to covering the marijuana industry. Westword's current marijuana editor is Thomas Mitchell.

== Westword MasterMind Awards ==
The Westword MasterMind Awards were started in 2005 to recognize and encourage the "aesthetic adventurers who are changing the cultural landscape" of Denver. The award comes with a no-strings attached cash grant. Katie Taft was awarded the Westworld Mastermind Award in 2006.
