= Serpentwithfeet =

American singer (born 1988)

serpentwithfeet
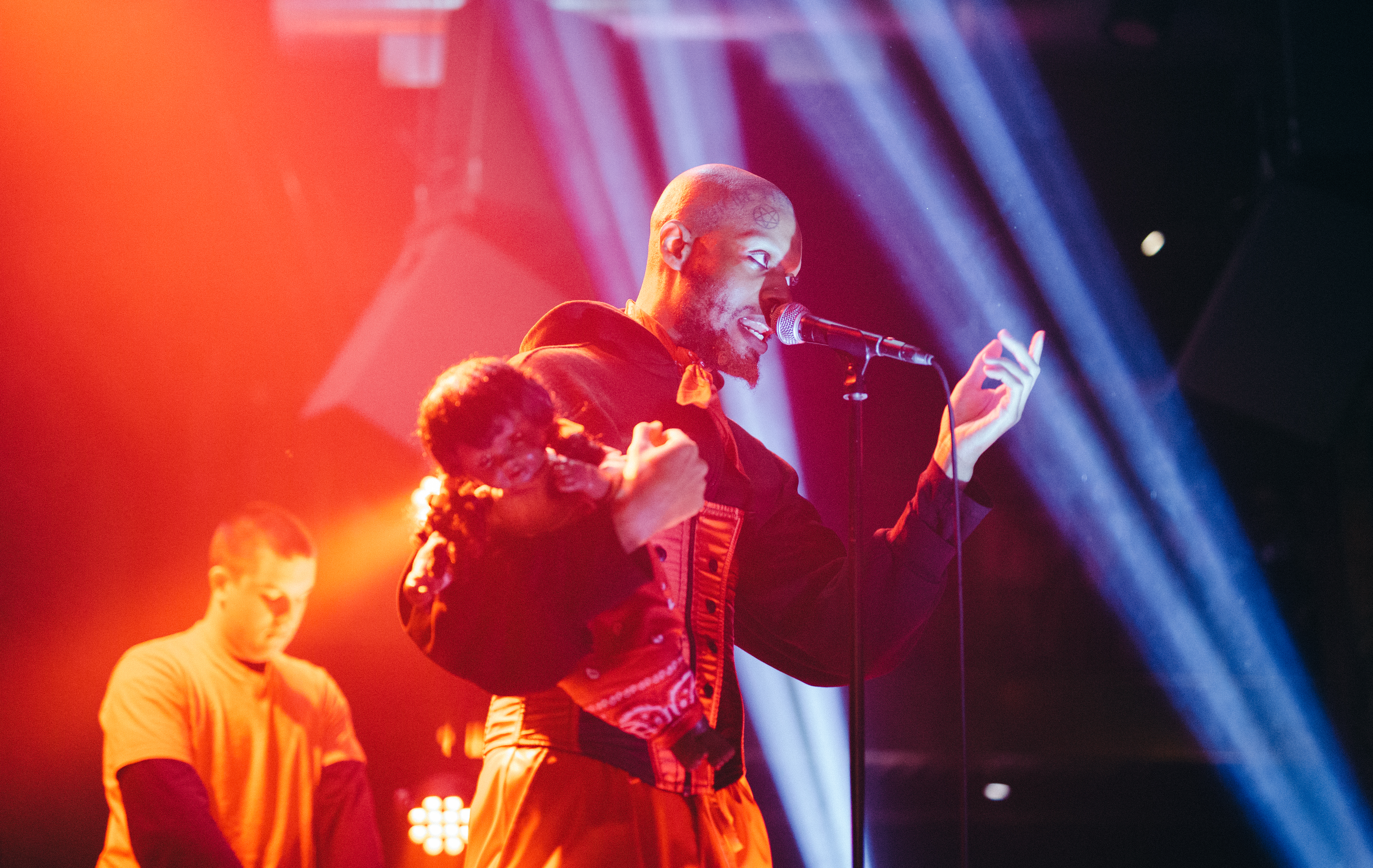
- serpentwithfeet performing in Minneapolis in 2017

Background information
- Born: Jonathan Josiah Wise; July 9, 1988 (age 38)
- Origin: Baltimore, Maryland, U.S.
- Genres: R&B; gospel; classical; electronic
- Occupations: Singer; songwriter; record producer
- Instrument: Vocals
- Years active: 2014–present
- Labels: Secretly Canadian; Tri Angle

Jonathan Josiah Wise (born July 9, 1988), known professionally as serpentwithfeet, is an R&B singer based in Brooklyn, New York City. Wise signed with the English record label Tri Angle to release his debut extended play (EP), Blisters (2016). He entered a joint venture with Secretly Canadian to release his debut studio album, soil (2018), which was met with critical acclaim. His second EP, Apparition (2020), and his second and third albums, Deacon (2021) and Grip (2024), were each met with continued critical praise.

== Early life ==
Wise was raised in Baltimore, Maryland. He grew up in a religious family; his father owned a Christian bookstore and his mother was a choir director. Wise joined the church choir as a child and grew up with classical and gospel music as a primary influence.

When he was 11 years old his mother asked him if he wanted to audition for the Maryland State Boychoir and, ignoring his refusal, she signed him up anyway and he ended up loving it. This was his introduction to classical vocal music. He realized from this experience that there was a lack of diversity in the choir and there was "not much room for the black voice."

He attended high school at Baltimore City College, a school for gifted and talented students that was known for their internationally competitive choir. At the age of 14, he competed in choir competitions with his school choir in Europe and won trophies. He said in an interview with Loud and Quiet: "It was all black kids, but our repertoire was predominantly classical. And that blew my mind." After this, Wise decided that he wanted to become a world-class performer and he started taking vocal lessons to become a classically trained opera singer.

He later moved to Philadelphia, where he attended the University of the Arts. Although Wise was initially interested in becoming a classical opera singer, he was rejected from conservatories he applied to.

== Career ==
After leaving the University of the Arts, Wise spent time in Paris and in Philadelphia's neo-soul scene. However, his voice was seen as closer in tone to opera than to his peers in neo-soul. Wise then moved to New York, where he released his first single "Curiosity of Other Men" in 2014.

The song led to Wise's eventual signing with Tri Angle in 2015 and the release of Wise's debut EP, Blisters, in 2016. The EP featured production from the Haxan Cloak, who has worked with artists including Björk and the Body. Blisters debuted to extremely positive reviews from critics.

Wise began work on his debut studio album Soil in 2017 with producers including Clams Casino, Katie Gately, and Adele collaborator Paul Epworth. The album was released on June 8, 2018, to positive reviews from critics. AllMusic observed that serpentwithfeet brought avant-garde elements into his usual mix of R&B, gospel and classical sounds to create a sense of aching sadness.

In 2017, Wise went on tour with the band Grizzly Bear as their opener. On the Brockhampton album Iridescence (2018), Serpentwithfeet features on the song "Tonya", which was first performed live on The Tonight Show Starring Jimmy Fallon. He appeared on a remix of Björk's "Blissing Me" (2017), and performed in concert with Björk on her 2019 Cornucopia tour. In 2019, he also served as the opening act in selected dates of Rosalía's El Mal Querer Tour.

On June 26, 2019, he released a song "Receipts", which featured Ty Dolla Sign. In 2020, Wise was featured in a track titled "Start" in Ellie Goulding's fourth studio album Brightest Blue, and collaborated with Ty Dolla Sign again by singing background vocals and writing on Ty Dolla Sign's song "Ego Death", a collaborative track with Kanye West, FKA Twigs, and Skrillex, and additionally appeared on an interlude on Ty Dolla Sign's 2020 album, Featuring Ty Dolla Sign.

On March 30, 2020, Wise released the single "A Comma" in collaboration with Adult Swim. He also announced his upcoming EP Apparition, via Secretly Canadian. Apparition was released on April 29, 2020. Made up of three songs, it includes the single "A Comma", "This Hill", and "Psychic".

On January 8, 2021, he was featured in Virgil Abloh's single titled "Delicate Limbs".

In January 2021, Serpentwithfeet announced his second studio album Deacon, and release the lead single "Fellowship", co-produced with Sampha and Lil Silva. The album released on March 26.

In August 2022, Serpentwithfeet released "On Air", a collaboration with Moby, released on the Always Centered at Night label. On September 30, 2022, he was featured on "Fungal City", one of the songs on Björk's album Fossora, marking their second collaboration.

== Personal life ==
Wise is gay and from a young age used gospel music to express his sexuality.

== Discography ==
=== Studio albums ===
Title	Album details
Soil	Released: June 8, 2018; Label: Secretly Canadian/Tri Angle Records; Formats: Digital download, streaming, CD, vinyl
Deacon	Released: March 26, 2021; Label: Secretly Canadian; Formats: Digital download, streaming, CD, vinyl
Grip	Released: February 16, 2024; Label: Secretly Canadian; Formats: Digital download, streaming

=== EPs ===
Title	EP details
Blisters	Released: September 2, 2016; Label: Tri Angle Records; Formats: Digital download, streaming, vinyl
Apparition	Released: April 29, 2020; Label: Secretly Canadian; Formats: Digital download, streaming
Deacon's Grove	Released: November 5, 2021; Label: Secretly Canadian; Formats: Digital download, streaming

=== Singles ===
Title	Year	Album
"Bless Ur Heart"	2018	Soil
"Cherubim"	2018	Soil
"Seedless"	2018	Soil
"Receipts" (featuring Ty Dolla Sign)	2019	Non-album singles
"Delicate Limbs" (with Virgil Abloh)	2021	Non-album singles
"Fellowship"	2021	Deacon
"Same Size Shoe"	2021	Deacon
"Heart Storm" (with Nao)	2021	Deacon
"You Don't Own Me / Canopy"	2021	Non-album single
"Down Nuh River"	2021	Deacon's Grove
"Fellowship (Remix)" (featuring Ambré and Alex Isley)	2021	Deacon's Grove
"Bless the Telephone"	2021	Non-album singles
"On Air" (with always centered at night and Moby)	2022	Non-album singles
"I'm Pressed"	2022	Non-album singles
"The Hands" (From the Original Motion Picture The Inspection)	2022	Non-album singles
"Gonna Go"	2023	Non-album singles
"Damn Gloves" (featuring Ty Dolla $ign and Yanga Yaya)	2023	Grip
"Safe Word"	2024	Grip
"Ellipsis" (featuring Orion Sun)	2024	Grip
"Writhing in the Wind"	2025	Grip Sequel
"Wanderer"	2025	Grip Sequel

=== Collaborations ===
- 2013 Gifts for Shitenno
- 2021 Luvaroq
- 2022 On Air

=== Music videos ===
Title	Year	Director(s)
"Four Ethers"	2016	CRUDO
"Cherubim"	2018	Allie Avital
"Bless Ur Heart"	2018	Andrew Thomas Huang
"Same Size Shoe"	2021	Shadae Lamar Smith and Rush Davis
"Fellowship"	2021	Kordae Jatafa Henry
"Heart Storm" (with NAO)	2021	—N/a
"Down Nuh River"	2021	John Marq and Jarred Jaymes
"Gonna Go"	2023	Jonathan Aubrie Lewis

=== Guest appearances ===
List of non-single guest appearances, with other performing artists, showing year released and album name
Title	Year	Artist(s)	Album
"Nu Renegade"	2015	Zebra Katz, Leila, JerVae Anthony	Nu Renegade
"Serpentwithfeet_Altadena_88 BPM"	2018	Kelela	Take Me a_Part, the Remixes
"Start"	2020	Ellie Goulding	Brightest Blue
"Scottie Pipen"	2021	Mick Jenkins	Elephant in the Room
"FYI"	2021	—N/a	Love, Victor: Season 2 (Original Soundtrack)
"Postcards"	2021	NAO	And Then Life Was Beautiful
"Ends Now"	2022	Lil Silva	Yesterday Is Heavy
"Woodland"	2022	Nosaj Thing	Continua
"Fungal City"	2022	Björk	Fossora
"Disillusioned"	2023	Daniel Caesar	Never Enough
