= Katey =

Name list

Katey is a given name, a variant spelling of Katie and Katy. Notable people with the name include:

- Katey Martin (born 1985), New Zealand cricketer
- Katey Sagal (born 1954), American actress
- Katey Stone (born 1966), American college ice hockey coach
- Katey Walter, American earth scientist
