= Aoife McMahon =

Irish actress

Aoife McMahon (born 1973) is an Irish actress. She is most noted for her performance as Mary "Bundle" Keane in the Canadian television miniseries Random Passage, for which she won the Gemini Award for Best Lead Actress in a Television Film or Miniseries at the 17th Gemini Awards in 2002.

She also had supporting roles in the British drama series Steel River Blues, Partners in Crime and Broken, but is currently most prominent as a voice actress in video games and a narrator of audiobooks.
