= Plants, People, Planet =

Botany journal

- Discipline: Botany
- Language: English
- Edited by: Simon Hiscock

Publication details
- History: 2018–present
- Publisher: Wiley-Blackwell on behalf of The New Phytologist Foundation
- Frequency: Bimonthly
- Open access: Yes
- License: CC BY 4.0
- Impact factor: 4.0 (2025)

Standard abbreviations
- ISO 4: Plants People Planet

Indexing
- ISSN: 2572-2611
- OCLC no.: 1099802834

Links
- Journal homepage; Current issue; Online archive

Plants, People, Planet is a bimonthly peer-reviewed scientific journal which focuses on plant science, and the links between plant science and society in particular. It was established in 2018 by the New Phytologist Foundation, and is published by Wiley-Blackwell on their behalf.

The journal's Editor-in-Chief is Simon Hiscock. There are two Deputy Editors-in-Chief: Katie J. Field and Paul Wilkin.

== Abstracting and indexing ==
The journal is abstracted and indexed in the Science Citation Index Expanded, the Social Sciences Citation Index, Current Contents/Agriculture, Biology & Environmental Sciences, Scopus, PubMed and the Directory of Open Access Journals.

According to the Journal Citation Reports, the journal has a 2025 impact factor of 4.0.
