= The Mountie (film) =

2011 film directed by S. Wyeth Clarkson

- Film poster
- Directed by: S. Wyeth Clarkson
- Written by: Charles Johnston, S. Wyeth Clarkson, Grant Sauvé
- Produced by: Phillip Daniels, Andrew Williamson, S. Wyeth Clarkson, Michael Vernon
- Starring: Andrew Walker; Jessica Paré; Earl Pastko; George Buza; Tony Munch; Matthew G. Taylor; John Wildman
- Cinematography: Rene Smith
- Edited by: Kerry Davie
- Music by: Ivan Barbotin
- Production companies: Travesty Productions & Releasing
- Distributed by: Lionsgate Entertainment
- Release dates: 4 March 2011 (KCFF); 1 July 2011 (Canada)
- Running time: 82 minutes
- Country: Canada
- Budget: <C$1,000,000

The Mountie (U.S.: The Way of the West; U.K.: The Ranger; France: Lawman) is a 2011 Canadian Western film directed by S. Wyeth Clarkson, co-written by Clarkson, Charles Johnston, and Grant Sauvé. Though drawing on elements of Canadian northern genre fiction, the film was pitched as a neo-spaghetti Western by Clarkson to its star, Andrew Walker. Walker plays a disgraced North-West Mounted Police officer dispatched in 1894 to survey the Yukon for a new garrison, where he encounters a small group of Russian settlers in a town in desperate need of law and order. The cast includes Earl Pastko as Olaf, a Russian Orthodox priest of dubious character, Jessica Paré as Amethyst, Olaf's scarred daughter, as well as George Buza, Tony Munch, Matthew G. Taylor, and John Wildman.

== Plot ==
In 1894, Corporal Wade Grayling, an officer of the North-West Mounted Police arrives in a remote and lawless settlement in the Yukon territory where the Commonwealth wants to build a fort. Upon his arrival, Grayling finds a hanged man, a death he correctly deduces to be connected to a small community of Cossacks - primarily Latvians and Russians - who have set up camp nearby. Olaf, their religious leader, says they killed the man for having stolen from them, the suspended body left as a warning to any other potential thieves. The Cossacks are unhappy about a fort being built on the land they have settled, which means moving. After an encounter with other visiting Cossacks, Grayling realizes why, and why they killed the man: the community's economy is based largely on the opium trade. Olaf maintains and harvests poppies. Grayling has personal reasons for putting a stop to it, as he was disgraced in the eyes of his superiors since he was found in a Chinese opium den the previous year. Grayling wages a one-man war against Olaf and the visitors. The matter is complicated by the need to protect the innocent, particularly Olaf's two daughters, the disfigured Amethyst, and young Cleora.

Several scenes are bridged by Robert Service poems read by Kestrel Martin, who portrays Cleora, Amethyst's young sister. The poems include "The Men That Don't Fit In", "Clancy of the Mounted Police," and "The Land of Beyond".

== Cast ==
- Andrew Walker as Wade Grayling
- Earl Pastko as Olaf
- Jessica Paré as Amethyst
- George Buza as Kleus
- Tony Munch as Cobb
- Andrey Ivchenko as Pachek
- Matthew G. Taylor as Nikolai
- Dean Williams as Damoslav
- John Wildman as Robert Johnson
- Kestrel Martin as Cleora
- Ada Chan as Chinese Woman

== Production ==
=== Background ===
In an interview with CTV News, Wyeth Clarkson talked about having been drawn since childhood to Western movies, such as those by John Ford and Sergio Leone, "but always wondered why American sheriffs were depicted onscreen, while Canadian officers were not", arguing the film is educational: "Canada has this rich history and this rich history of iconographic characters that we don't see on our screens and to me that's a real loss, especially for kids who can be so easily influenced to want to learn... For me, it's important as a filmmaker to sort of stir that pot and at least give people access to Canadian stories." In another interview for The Globe and Mail, he said "I knew to conquer the Canadian West, these guys had to be tough as nails. And I don't think Canadian film has played the resilient qualities of the Mounties up enough."

=== Financing ===
Made for a little under C$1,000,000, The Mountie received equity production funding from Telefilm Canada's Ontario office and the Harold Greenberg Fund, as well as production funding support from the Yukon Film & Sound Commission.

=== Casting ===
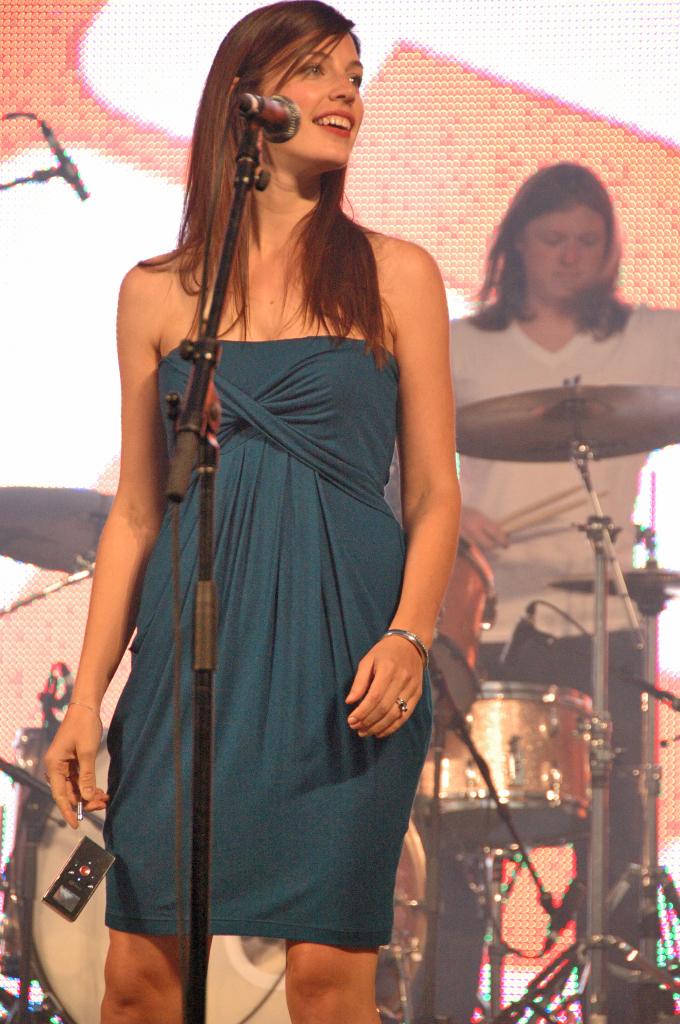
Jessica Paré at TIFF in 2009

Of his lead Andrew Walker, Clarkson said he "just jumped off the screen for me. ... He sent me an audition tape, and Andrew just embodied what I imagined the Mountie to be. There is a fearlessness to him ... and he also was a punt return football player, so he actually is pretty tough. I talked to Andrew about how much I wanted Canadian kids to be able to celebrate their icons and their history, and one day he raised his shirt and showed me a maple-leaf tattoo on his chest. Then he said, 'See, I'm true red Canadian too.'" Walker recounted how Clarkson "sold" the film to him as a Canadian spaghetti Western, resulting in the actor spending a lot of time studying Clint Eastwood. He also studied historical figures such as Sam Steele and other portrayals of the predecessors of the present-day Royal Canadian Mounted Police.

As for Jessica Paré, Clarkson said he was lucky to cast her "before she caught the eye of" Mad Men creator Matthew Weiner. "I think Jessica is as close as we have to someone with the kind of transcendent beauty I needed for that part ... She's got the looks, as well as the acting chops."

=== Filming ===
Principal photography took place on a remote location west of Whitehorse, Yukon, in 2009, under the working title Red Coat Justice. The shooting location was a 45-minute drive for the cast and crew to a logging road, followed by a 30-minute hike to the set itself. Clarkson said he felt "budgetary pressure to shoot the film elsewhere but stood his ground," and suggested "that the best North American westerns of the last 20 years have probably all been shot in Canada."

=== Music ===
The film features original music by Toronto-based Russian-Canadian composer Ivan Barbotin, performed by the Russian Philharmonic Orchestra.

== Release ==
Clarkson returned to his alma mater, Queen's University, to screen The Mountie at the 11th annual Kingston Canadian Film Festival on 4 March 2011, at the Empire Theatre 1. It received a gala screening at Canada House in London, England.

=== Distribution and marketing ===
==== Domestic ====
The film received a limited release in theatres on 1 July 2011 (Canada Day), in Toronto, Vancouver, and Calgary, followed by six more cities across Canada on 8 July. Clarkson is said to have "angled hard to get theatres to screen The Mountie on Canada Day", but, according to Greg Klymkiw:

What Clarkson ended up with was a handful of screens - mostly on AMC and/or independents, plus a prints and ads budget commensurate with such a small release. The numbers weren't great, but they were surprisingly on a par, if not higher than a number of Hollywood releases within the same multiplexes. Clarkson pushed and pushed to get screens. He got them, but not what he imagined and certainly not what he deserved.

==== International ====
Craig Morrow and Cinemavault managing director John Dunstan closed an overseas distribution deal with Jason Price and producer Phillip Daniels of Travesty Productions, retitling the film Lawman for international markets such as France.

=== Home media ===
The Mountie was released on DVD and Blu-ray in the United States on 19 July 2011, under the title The Way of the West. In the United Kingdom it was released on DVD under the title The Ranger.

Released in 2014 on DVD and blu-ray in Germany, though the American title was used, covers explicitly referenced the 1971 film Lawman, saying it was like a remake of the Burt Lancaster western.

== Critical reception ==
The Mountie received mixed reviews from critics.

Greg Klymkiw calls The Mountie Clarkson's "most ambitious project to date", "a solid picture", an "old fashioned western replete with a strange blend of 70s cynicism, grit and ... lush panoramas and a weirdly affecting sentimental streak that would have made John Ford proud." The film is "both unabashedly Canadian and yet presented in homage to a myriad of great western traditions." Jennie Punter, writing for The Globe and Mail, gave the film a very positive review: "With gorgeous cinematography, brisk pacing, evocative music, well-orchestrated showdowns and no-nonsense storytelling, The Mountie delivers an entertaining slice of Canadian history that never feels like it's a patriotic duty to watch," at the same time noting the film is most effective when actions play out against the spectacular backdrop of the Yukon, but "less so when the characters start talking." Liz Braun also gave a positive review, saying there was something "satisfyingly Canadian" about the film.

Susan G. Cole gave the film a "mediocre" rating, describing it as "another meticulously made Canadian feature with a good cast, beautiful music and a gorgeous look," but finding the script extremely lacking: "There isn't a line of believable dialogue or a piece of the action you can't predict, and the ending is ludicrous." Chris Knight, writing for The National Post, gave the film 2.5 stars, calling it a "taut drama," and thought the Robert Service poems were a "nice touch", at the same time finding "the film stalls during the frequent gun battles, which unfold in an uninspired manner." The film lacks subtlety: "It's as if Grayling had told the townsfolk to boil their dialogue along with their drinking water." Linda Barnard agreed, giving the film 2 stars out of 4, saying the film is "gorgeously shot" but suffers from poor dialogue: "More suited to a made-for-TV movie than theatrical release, The Mountie winds up with a silly ending before it rides off into the sunset." Ken Eisner praises the cinematography, editing, and music, but complains "the story, dialogue, and acting" are sub-par: "The lines themselves—which fall doggedly in the well-charted territory of "Let's finish this!"—sound more like Xbox shoot-'em-up hiccups than anything in spaghetti westerns, let alone samurai flicks or even Due South", and even suggests that the film "bears a striking resemblance" to the Old West game, Red Dead Redemption.

Robert Bell found the film culturally retrogressive: "Canada has hopped on the male ego bandwagon, purporting the titular enforcer in red as an ersatz cowboy, literally detailing the generic Western format in the most rudimentary and embarrassing manner possible," opining that the film had no redeeming qualities whatsoever: "Perhaps it's cruel to dote on the sheer ineptitude of this production, from its borderline incoherent action sequences to the misguided cinematography and woefully integrated exposition, but it's truly impossible to imagine anyone taking this film seriously beyond mockery and sheer jaw-dropping amazement."

A common thread among reviewers, regardless of how they felt about the film, is the similarity of Walker's performance to that of Clint Eastwood. Linda Barnard in particular did not understand why a Canadian film "spends so much time aping Clint Eastwood it could have been titled A Fistful of Loonies, in reference to A Fistful of Dollars.
