= Posers (film) =

- Directed by: Katie Tallo
- Written by: Katie Tallo
- Produced by: Chantal Ling
- Starring: Jessica Paré; Sarain Boylan; Stefanie von Pfetten; Emily Hampshire; Adam Beach
- Cinematography: Claudine Sauvé
- Edited by: Katie Tallo
- Music by: Serge Coté
- Production company: Twist Pictures
- Distributed by: Hart Sharp Video; Seville Pictures
- Release date: September 22, 2002 (Cinéfest)
- Running time: 80 minutes
- Country: Canada
- Language: English

Posers is a 2002 Canadian drama film written and directed by Katie Tallo.

== Plot ==
Adria (Jessica Pare) is a young woman living the young urban career professional life seemingly all around innocent and radiantly angelic with a dark side, she's getting more criminally inclined with a trio of morally depraved young women who live for two things, vanity and revenge, who does a voiceover of the rules of getting their good favor and worshipping the queen bee, Love (Stefanie von Pfetten). They go to a nightclub and then follow Sadie (Danielle Kind), a young woman to the washroom and then swarmbeat her to death for cheating on Love with her boyfriend. Police Detective Sinclair (Adam Beach) investigates the four for the murder and gets nowhere cause a rule by Adria, "When something happens, blame it on a man" and begins a relationship with Adria, learning that her mother is in the hospital. Suddenly, Love has disappeared with blood smeared everywhere in her apartment which traumatises the other three. Then as the three go about their lives, their conscience gets the better of them, getting more pathologically paranoid. At a party, the girls then argue and Vonny produces a handgun, then leaves the room only to be fatally shot by police. Ruth (Emily Hampshire) is then arrested for the murder of Love and Sinclair reveals a twist ending, Adria does not have a hospital-ridden mother, who died long ago and Adria suffers from multiple personality disorder, meaning Adria actually murdered Love.

== Cast ==
- Jessica Paré as Adria
- Sarain Boylan as Vonny
- Stefanie von Pfetten as Love
- Emily Hampshire as Ruth
- Adam Beach as Police Detective Sinclair
- Chad Connell as Pretty Boy
- Dani Kind as Sadie (as Danielle Kind)
- Adrian Langley as Cal
- Alexandra Sinclair as Kaitlin

== Release ==
Posers premiered on September 22, 2002 at Cinéfest, followed by a home video release in early 2004.

== Production ==
Filming for Posers took place in Ottawa during November 2001, over a period of 15 days. The film marked Tallo's second feature film, following the made for TV movie Juiced.

== Reception ==
DVD Talk reviewed Posers, writing that The characters and settings of Posers are good enough to stand on their own merits. Unfortunately, on top of what would have been an interesting, admittedly quieter film, Tallo has shoe-horned a murder mystery and compensated by trying to "surprise" the viewer at every turn."
