= Katie Gately =

- Genres: Electronic; experimental
- Occupations: Composer; musician; music producer; teacher
- Instruments: Vocals; keyboards; field recordings; ableton live; computer
- Years active: 2013–present
- Labels: Houndstooth; Tri-Angle Records; FatCat Records; Public information
- Website: katiegately.com

Katie Gately is an American musician, composer, producer and sound designer based in Los Angeles, California. As well as her own releases she has remixed Björk and Zola Jesus and produced for serpentwithfeet. Her most recent album, Fawn / Brute, was released on March 31, 2023.

== Background ==
Gately was raised in Brooklyn, New York and moved to Los Angeles to study at USC where she graduated with an MFA in Film Production, where she focused on Sound Design. Gately also holds a BA in Philosophy from Carleton College, and had focused on Philosophy of Music.

After releasing singles on Blue Tapes, Fet Press, FatCat, and a self-titled mini album on Public Information, Gately released her debut album Color in 2016.

== Color ==
Her debut album Color was released in 2016 with Tri-Angle, and it meshed samples and found sounds with manipulations of her own voice to create maximalist electronic compositions deploying fractured rhythms, fierce licks and bold samples. Will Neibergall writes in a Tiny Mix Tapes review, "While it has predictably little in common with anything else she’s done, Color shares the cinematic quality of the latter. Where her self-titled EP could soundtrack body horror or seismic intensity, Gately’s debut Tri Angle LP is darkly whimsical." Clare Lobenfeld writes for Pitchfork, "Gately benefits from sound design know-how from her film production MFA studies at USC and her professional experience. This skill set benefits the intricacies of her beat constructions—harmonies built on tweaked vocal samples to bolster her own voice ("Sift"); cello and garbage-can percussion eloquently melding to make something reminiscent of grunge, but still reflective of current electronic trends at its core ("Frisk")."

== Loom ==
She returned to her family home in Brooklyn and started again, rebuilding the album around the track "Bracer", which was her mother’s favorite.

Loom was critically acclaimed upon its release with publications such as The Guardian, Pitchfork, Paste, The Quietus, Loud and Quiet, musicOMH, Brooklyn Vegan and The Financial Times including the album in their Best Albums of 2020.

== Pipes ==
Pipes was composed, recorded, produced and engineered by Gately, and Quietus named Pipes as one of their albums of the year in 2014.

Fawn / Brute followed in 2023.

== Influences ==
Katie Gately mentions Kid A, Tarkovsky’s Stalker and The Mirror as a few of her early influences in music. She recalls and states "becoming obsessed with mostly British post-punk and then at the same time I was interested in Autechre and weird electronic music... It made me feel like, 'I don't know what I'm feeling, I don't know what this is, and I feel like something new.' It's very bizarre and uncomfortable and exciting, and I started to become addicted to that feeling; definitely feeling excited in a positive way, but with this ambiguity, and this feeling of unpredictability. In a 2016 interview with The Guardian, she said, "I’m a pretty diehard Billy Joel fan, which my parents raised me to believe was normal but friends have since told me is unfortunate."

== Discography ==
=== Albums ===
Katie Gately albums
Title	Details
Katie Gately	Released: September 2013; Label: Public Information; Format: Vinyl, digital
Color	Released: October 2016; Label: Tri Angle; Format: CD, vinyl, digital
Loom	Released: February 2020; Label: Houndstooth; Format: CD, vinyl, digital
Fawn / Brute	Released: March 2023; Format: CD, vinyl, digital

=== Singles ===
Katie Gately singles
Title	Details
"Waltz"	Released: January 2020; Label: Houndstooth; Format: Digital
"Bracer"	Released: November 2019; Label: Houndstooth; Format: Digital
"Pivot"	Released: October 2014; Label: Fat Cat; Format: Vinyl
"Far"	Released: May 2014; Label: FET Press; Format: Vinyl
"Last Day"	Released: July 2013; Label: Public Information UK
"Pipes"	Released: October 2013; Label: Blue Tapes; Format: Cassette

=== Remixes ===
Katie Gately remixes
Title	Artist	Details
"Siphon" (Katie Gately Remix)	Zola Jesus	Released: April 2018; Label: Sacred Bones; Format: Vinyl
"Immersion" (Katie Gately Remix)	Tangents	Released: April 2018; Label: Temporary Residence Ltd; Format: Digital
"Family" (Katie Gately Remix)	Bjork	Released: September 2015; Label: One Little Indian Records; Format: Vinyl

== Productions ==
Production work by Katie Gately
Recording	Co-Producer	Songs	Details
Soil	serpentwithfeet	"Whisper"; "Slow Syrup"; "Bless Ur Heart"; "Cherubim"; "Mourning Song"	Released: June 2018; Label: Secretly Canadian; Format: LP Vinyl

== Compositions ==
- Passer Passer (2014) – Sound Designer
- Once Upon a Line (2016) – Sound Designer

== Other collaborations ==
- Mimeomeme, Seattle Phonographers Union, CD, October 2010
