= Color (Katie Gately album) =

Studio album by Katie Gately
- Released: October 14, 2016
- Genre: Electronic music
- Length: 41:33
- Language: English
- Label: Tri Angle
- Producer: Katie Gately

Katie Gately chronology
Katie Gately (2013)	Color (2016)	Loom (2020)

Color is the first full-length studio album by American electronic musician Katie Gately, released by Tri Angle Records on October 14, 2016. It has received positive reviews from critics.

== Reception ==
Professional ratings
Aggregate scores
Source	Rating
Metacritic	78/100 (12 reviews)
Review scores
Source	Rating
AllMusic	4/5 stars
Drowned in Sound	8/10
Exclaim!	8/10
The Independent	4/5 stars
Pitchfork Media	7.3/10
PopMatters	7/10
TinyMixTapes	3.5/5 stars

Color received positive reviews from critics noted at review aggregator Metacritic. It has a weighted average score of 78 out of 100, based on 12 reviews.

Editors at AllMusic rated this album 4 out of 5 stars, with critic Heather Phares writing "Gately's audacious ideas and artistry make Color a dazzling debut album"; the website also chose this as one of the Best of 2016 electronic albums, calling it a "fascinating debut [that] combines the avant-garde and pop with surreal wit". Writing for Drowned in Sound, Lee Adcock scored Color an 8 out of 10, writing that the second half of the album is weaker than the first, but the music has "zany highs" that "conjure a fantastic parallel world, lightyears away from any other fighting contender, and still unforgettable in private lives". Bryon Hayes of Exclaim! gave the same score and sums up his review, "Color certainly announces Katie Gately as a force to be reckoned with, a true auteur with a singular—and highly listenable—vision". In The Independent, Andy Gill gave Color 4 out of 5 stars for a "plethora of sounds and multi-tracked vocals layered into rich, dense sonic tableaux" that are "complex, involved and engaging".

Claire Lobenfeld of Pitchfork Media rated this release a 7.3 out of 10 for twisting "odd, outré samples into big pop shapes", writing that it "boasts the sort of large-scale electronic compositions that can often feel monolithically lonely... and yet the album sounds and feels collaborative, as if it were the product of multiple viewpoints and inputs". In PopMatters, Max Totsky gave Color a 7 out of 10, stating that "the moments that need some cleaning up are usually rambunctious and brief enough to get by, and when she finds a sweet spot between allure and aggression, it is almost untouchable". The Quietus' Danijela Bočev stated that "Gately is master of deep cinematic atmosphere and blessed with an uncanny sense of multidimensional musical space" and this release "challenges the imperative of performing, conventionally tied to the idea of musicianship, as technical difficulties would prevent this powerhouse to ever take some stage by storm in the form it's presented here". Writing for Resident Advisor, Angus Finlayson states that Gately "overshot" with this album and it suffers from "chronic maximalism". Will Neibergall of TinyMixTapes gave Color a 3.5 out of 5 for being "surprisingly eclectic... in the context of Gately’s elusive and kinetic oeuvre" and stating that it is "as deserving of your undivided attention as it is confounding mixed with almost any other sense perception".

== Track listing ==
All songs written by Katie Gately.

1. "Lift" – 4:17
2. "Tuck" – 5:28
3. "Sift" – 6:51
4. "Rive" – 6:15
5. "Frisk" – 4:27
6. "Sire" – 4:59
7. "Color" – 9:16

== Personnel ==
- Katie Gately – music, mixing, production
- Tomory Dodge – artwork
- Collin Fletcher – design, layout
- Sam Jones – bass guitar on "Color", mixing
- Heba Kadry – mastering at Timeless Mastering
- Alexis Morrell – vocals on "Lift"
- Robert Wedemeyer – photography

== See also ==
- List of 2016 albums
