= Katie McVicar =

Canadian trade unionist

- Born: 1856; Hamilton
- Died: 18 June 1886; Hamilton
- Occupations: Trade unionist, cordwainer

Kate McVicar (c. 1856 - June 18, 1886), was a suffragist and labor union leader in Canada. She organized the first trade union for women workers in Canada under the guidance of the Knights of Labor.

Shoemaking factory in Pennsylvania (1887)

== Life ==
Katie McVicar was born in Hamilton, around 1856, to an English mother and a Scottish tinsmith. She had two older sisters.

She started working in factories as a shoe-maker in the 1870s. She kept living with her parents in Hamilton, in order to raise their overall standards of living until her death, on June 18, 1886. Since she didn't marry, she kept working in factories for far longer than most women of her status at the time.

== Unionizing women ==
=== The Knights of Labor ===
The Knights of Labor started organizing in Hamilton in 1882. The same year, they recruited women workers, which became a tenet of their order, since they considered labor unions should transcend gender, race and skill. In 1883, Katie McVicar started sending letters to the Palladium of Labor, the secret Knights of Labor press in Hamilton, hoping they would be published.

Those letters were signed "A Canadian Girl" and explained why it was difficult to recruit women in labor unions, which were male-centered. McVicar underlined the inequalities women faced both at work and within labor unions. She also encouraged women to join the movement so they could all find solutions to those issues together.

A Knight replied to her letters through the Palladium, and suggested she discreetly contact her own coworkers about those issues until she could put together a group of 10 women. After that, she could contact him through the Palladium to meet the Knights. In January 1884, local assembly 3040 was founded in Hamilton and included women workers of the textile and shoemaking industries.

That same year, a women workers' march was led by McVicar for Labor Day. As traditions dictated then, women couldn't be seen in work clothes. They paraded inside unionized taxis, for the sake of propriety.

=== Local assembly 3179 ===
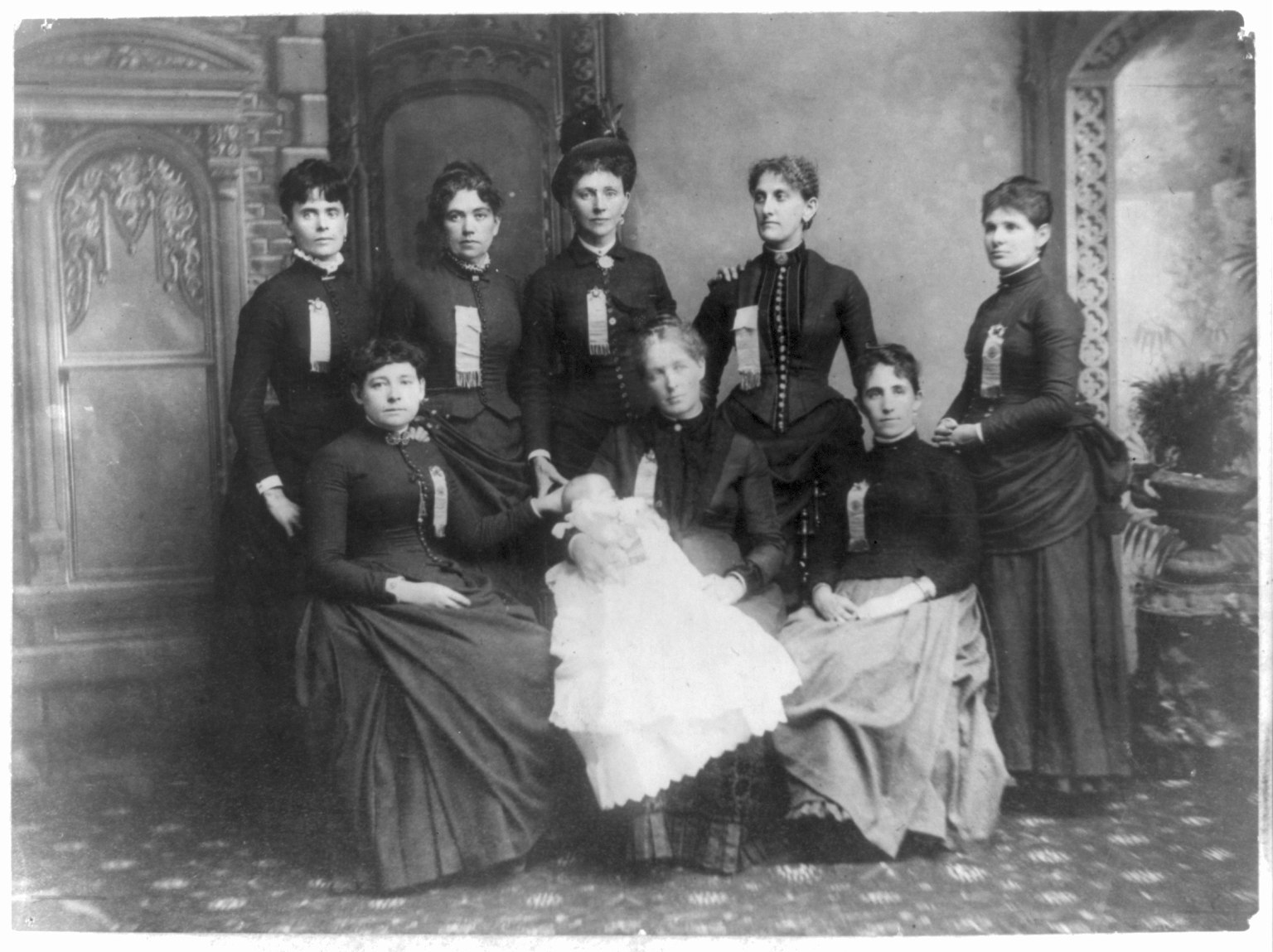
Women delegates to the 1886 convention of the Knights of Labor

Later in the year, shoemakers created local assembly 3179, which was the very first all-women labor union in Canada. Katie McVicar became its first chairwoman. The assembly had 221 members when it was first created.

The popularity of both assembly 3179 and 3040 waned between 1884 and 1885, but their creation inspired the Knights to launch at least 8 other all-women assemblies in Ontario in the 1880s. They also managed to recruit more women in general assemblies. In 1886, the very first women delegates sent to the Trades and Labor Congress of Canada were Knights of Labor.

As head of local assembly 3179, Katie McVicar became a public figure, which was a difficult stance to keep at the time since it was far from the female ideal of modesty, and probably made it difficult to marry. McVicar herself warned against unionized women's desire to use the Knights to become notorious.

After her death, only a year after the creation of assembly 3179, unionized shoemakers asked the Knights not to replace McVicar with another woman from the assembly. For two years, they were led by male heads of other assemblies.

The Knights of Labor became less and less popular by the end of the century, which left women workers in Canada without any way to unionize until World War I.

== Women's right to vote ==
As a union leader, McVicar could publicly challenge gender inequality. She supported the movement for women's suffrage and women's rights to a political voice. For example, she used the case of Maria McCabe, a mother who killed her illegitimate baby, in order to show the importance of including women in law making and politics at large. Allowing women to change laws would prevent this type of tragedy.

This case was then used in the same way by the Knights of Labor to champion women's rights in the following years.

== See also ==
- Leonora O'Reilly
- Aurora Phelps
