= Katie Knipp =

- Performing in Concord, CA, May 2026

Background information
- Genres: Blues; Americana; rock; electronica; art rock; neo soul
- Occupations: Singer; songwriter; musician
- Instruments: Vocals; piano; keyboards; guitar; harmonica
- Website: www.katieknipp.com

Katie Knipp is an American singer, songwriter, multi-instrumentalist, and blues Americana artist.

== Early life and education ==
Knipp was born in Alameda, California. She completed her bachelor of arts degree in music from California State University, East Bay, Hayward, California.

== Career ==
Knipp released her first solo album, Violent in Here, in 2003, followed by Take Her Down in 2005, Midnight Mind in 2009, and Nice to Meet You in 2012.

She released the Take It With You album in 2018, which reached number 10 on the Billboard Blues Album Chart. On 12 March 2021, she released her sixth album, The Well, which was digitally distributed by Heart Songs Corporation. The track "Chamomile and Cocaine" from the album was released digitally in 2020, and other songs were released with the album in 2021. The album debuted at number 4 on the Billboard Blues Album chart. Both albums ranked on the Roots Music Report for Top Contemporary Blues albums. On 10 June 2022, she released her seventh album, Katie Knipp Live at The Green Room Social Club, that rose to number 6 on the iTunes Blues Albums chart upon its debut as well as number 9 on the Billboard Blues Albums chart. Her eighth album, Me, was released on 7 June 2024 and debuted at number 5 on the Billboard Blues Album chart. On 24 October 2025, Knipp released her ninth album, Dance Me, an electronica album featuring producer and bassist Pancho Tomaselli. Her tenth album, Live at Theater 5150, was independently released on 18 September 2026.

Knipp is a two-time winner of Sacramento Music awards for best blues artist in 2019 and 2020. She was also nominated as Artist of the Year 2019 by the Sacramento News and Review. She was honored as the Artist of the Year 2020 by the Country Folk Americana Blues Music Realm.

Knipp has opened for several music artists, including Robert Cray, Jimmie Vaughan, Joan Osborne, The Hidalgos, The Doobie Brothers, The James Hunter Six, Jon Cleary, Ruthie Foster, and others.

She performs both as a solo artist and with her band. As a multi-instrumentalist, she plays piano, slide guitar, and harmonica, besides her vocals.

== Discography ==
=== Albums ===
Title	Released	Ref
Violent in Here	2003	
Take Her Down	February 1, 2005	
Midnight Mind	January 28, 2010	
Take It With You	November 7, 2018	
Katie Knipp Live at The Green Room Social Club	June 10, 2022	
Me	June 7, 2024	
Dance Me	October 24, 2025	
Live at Theater 5150	September 18, 2026	

=== EPs ===
Title	Released	Ref
The Well	March 12, 2021 Digital Distribution: Heart Songs Corporation	
Nice to Meet You	July 13, 2012	

== Personal life ==
Knipp is married and has two sons, Tommy and James.
