= Bernice Morgan =

Canadian novelist and short-story writer (born 1935)

Bernice Morgan (born 1935) is a Canadian novelist and short-story writer. Much of her work portrays the history and daily life of Newfoundland. She is best known for her novel Random Passage which became a television mini-series on CBC.

== Early life ==
Bernice Morgan (born 8 February 1935) is a Canadian novelist and short story writer from, St. John's, in pre-Confederation Newfoundland, to William Vardy of Random Island, Trinity Bay and Sadie (Vincent) Vardy of Cape Island, Bonavista Bay, Newfoundland and Labrador, she's best known for the historical novels Random Passage (1992) and Waiting for Time (1994) which are adapted into the CBC news television ministries. St. John's, in pre-Confederation Newfound. Much of Morgan's writing reflects life in these outport communities.

She attended the St. John's Seventh-day Adventist Academy from Grade 1 to Grade 10. Morgan completed her last year of high school at MacPherson Academy, after which she took a Commercial Course at Bishop Spencer, where her formal education ended.

Morgan married George Morgan, also of St. John's, in November 1956. The couple had three children: a son and two daughters.

== Career ==
After leaving her Commercial Course, Morgan worked at a variety of office jobs as a cashier and clerk. During those years she continued to write, winning several Newfoundland & Labrador Arts and Letters Awards and publishing in local newspapers and magazines and on CBC Radio. Morgan's first writing job was at the Daily News where she published a weekly column titled "Suburban Scrawl" under the pseudonym Maggie Barrett. Subsequently, Morgan worked for many years in public relations, first with Memorial University of Newfoundland where she was editor of "The Gazette" and later with the Newfoundland Teachers' Association (NTA) where she edited "The Bulletin".

Morgan, together with writers Helen Fogwell Porter and Geraldine Chafe Rubia, edited From This Place (Jesperson Press, 1977), a collection of the writing by 45 women of Newfoundland and Labrador. The project was funded by a Secretary of State Grant to mark International Women's Year.

Literary magazines that have published Morgan's short stories include "Fiddlehead", "The Pottersfield Portfolio", "Grain", and "Tickle Ace". Among the anthologies that have carried Morgan's writing are, Digging Into the Hill (Writers Alliance of Newfoundland & Labrador), Twelve Newfoundland Short Stories (eds. Janes and Cuff, Harry Cuff), The Breakwater Book of Contemporary Newfoundland Short Fiction (ed. Matthews, Breakwater), Dropped Threads 3: Beyond the Small Circle (ed. Anderson, Vintage Canada), and Signatures: Newfoundland Women Artists and Writers (ed. McGrath, Killick). School textbooks with Morgan's short stories include Themes For All Times (Jesperson Press); Cultures (Harcourt Brace); and Openings and Stages (Breakwater Books).

In September 1986, Morgan resigned from the NTA to begin working on her first novel. Random Passage, published in 1992, depicts a fishing community in the 1800s in a fictional Newfoundland outport called Cape Random. The place name is a combination of her parents' birthplaces. The sequel, Waiting for Time (1994), carried the story of Cape Random forward into the Newfoundland Cod Moratorium of 1992. Waiting for Time was awarded the 1995 Thomas Head Raddall Award and the Canadian Author's Association Award for Fiction (1992). It was republished in Ireland, and in translation in Quebec and Germany.

In 2002, the four-part TV mini-series Random Passage, produced by Barbara Doran, was aired in Canada by the Canadian Broadcasting Company and in Ireland. The screenplay, by St. John's writer Des Walsh, was based on Morgan's first two novels. The film site remained as a tourist attraction after the series ended.

Morgan's third novel, Cloud of Bone (Knopf Canada, 2007), explores humanity's capacity for genocidal violence. Moving from World War II, St. John's to 1998 Rwanda and Yugoslavia, and then to a pre-European Newfoundland. Cloud of Bone examines the murder of the Beothuks through the eyes of a World War II sailor, Shawnadithit, and a British anthropologist. Cloud of Bone won the 2008 Newfoundland & Labrador Book Award in Fiction and was shortlisted for the Thomas Head Raddall Award. The novel has been republished by Penguin Books.

In 2015, Morgan's novella, The Dragon's Song, was printed as a limited edition art book by Running the Goat Books and Broadsides and illustrated with woodblock engravings and lithographs by her daughter Jennifer Morgan. This novella follows the life of two Newfoundland Christian missionaries in pre World War II China. Her children's book, Seasons Before the War, illustrated by Brita Granstrom, was published by the same press in 2018. Morgan has described this book as, "the story of free-range children in prewar St. John's." Seasons Before the War was one of four books shortlisted for the INDY Nonfiction Award in 2021.

In the summer of 2022 Perchance Theatre, based in Cupids, Newfoundland, mounted Morgan's play "Area of Uncertainty" under the direction of Sarah Phillips. This play describes the effect of Amelia Earhart's eleven-day stop-over on Trepassey, Newfoundland, in 1928.

== Honours ==
In 1996, Morgan was named Artist of the Year by the Newfoundland and Labrador Arts Council and in 1998 she was awarded an honorary degree by Memorial University of Newfoundland and Labrador. She is a member of the Order of Canada and received the Queen's Golden Jubilee Medal in 2003, and the Queen's Diamond Jubilee Medal in 2012. In 2020, the St. John's YWCA presented her with their Woman of Distinction Award, and in December of that year, Morgan was inducted into the Newfoundland and Labrador Arts Council (ArtsNL) Hall of Honour.

== Bibliography ==
=== Novels ===
- Random Passage (1992), ISBN 1-55081-043-X
- Waiting for Time (1994), ISBN 1-55081-080-4
- Cloud of Bone (2007), ISBN 978-0-676-97938-1

=== Novella ===
- The Dragon's Song (2015), ISBN 9781927917008

=== Short stories ===
- The Topography of Love (2000), ISBN 1-55081-157-6

=== Children's Book ===
- Seasons Before the War (2018), ISBN 978-1-927917183

=== Anthologies ===
- From This Place: A Selection of Writing by Women of Newfoundland and Labrador (1977), ISBN 0-920502-02-4 (edited with Helen Porter and Geraldine Rubia)
