= Katie Savannah Steele =

American model rocketeer (born 1992)

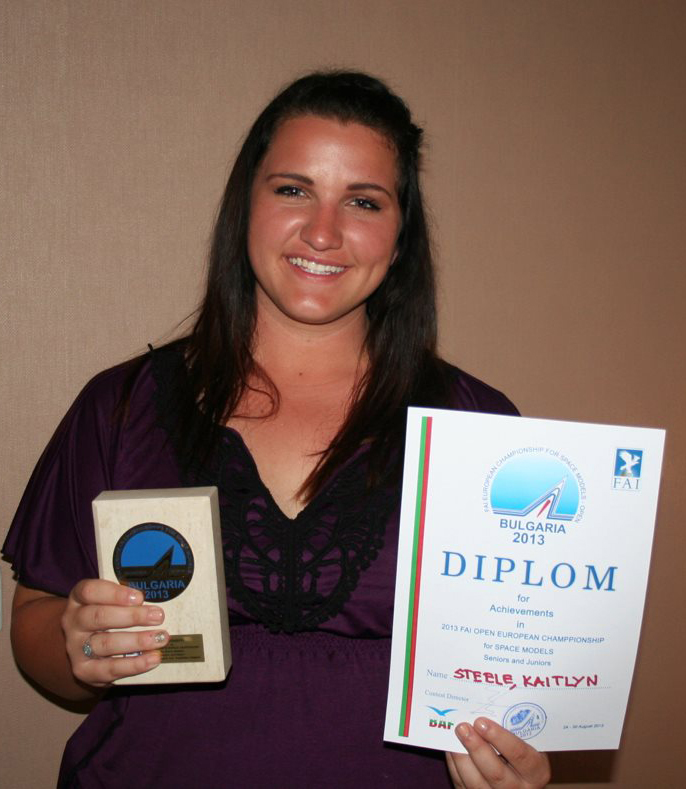
- Accepting an award in Bulgaria in 2013
- Born: Kaitlyn Savannah Steele; December 29, 1992 (age 33); Murray, Utah, U.S.
- Education: Southern Utah University
- Occupation: Special Educator
- Organizations: National Association of Rocketry; Fédération Aéronautique Internationale; Superstition Spacemodeling Society; Utah Rocket Club

Katie Savannah Steele (born December 29, 1992) is an American model rocketeer. She is actively involved in National Association of Rocketry. She has been featured in several magazines, including Sport Rocketry. Her notable works include three separate national championships at the National Association of Rocketry's Annual Meet (2006, 2008, 2010). She is known for competing on the United States team in the World Space Modeling Championships in Serbia in 2010 and acting as assistant team manager of United States junior team in World Space Modeling Championships in Liptovský Mikuláš Slovakia in 2012 and at the European Spacemodeling Championships in Shumen, Bulgaria in 2013 and Lviv, Ukraine in 2015. Steele and her two sisters, Caroline, and Cassidy have also competed as a team at the Team America Rocketry Challenge (2010). The Steele family has been involved with model rocketry since 2004.

Steele and her sisters have been one of the factors within the field of hobby model rocketry to help create a new, young female influence within the hobby itself, which beforehand had been predominantly male.

== Early life and education ==
Kaitlyn (Katie) Savannah Steele was born in Murray, Utah. She is the daughter of Robyn Palmer and Matt Steele. Steele graduated from Southern Utah University in 2014 with a degree in elementary and special education.

== Involvement in Model Rocketry ==
=== National Level ===
Steele began her involvement in model rocketry at age eleven. Her fellow competitors included her three siblings. Steele competed in her first NARAM in 2004 in The Plains, Virginia. In 2005, she competed in West Chester, Ohio. In 2006, she competed in Phoenix, Arizona and earned her first national title. She also placed first for her research and development report, entitled Experimental Determination of Drag Coefficients. In 2007, she competed in Kalamazoo, Michigan, earning another first for her research and development report, A Comparison of Parachute Descent Rates. In 2008, the competition was again in The Plains, Virginia, where Steele earned her second national title. In 2009, the competition moved to Johnstown, Pennsylvania, where Steele placed fourth for her research and development report on simulator accuracy of low-powered models, and Steele earned her third national title in the 2010 competition in Pueblo, Colorado. She also placed second for her research and development report on developing a piston for cluster engine models. In 2011, Steele placed second in the national meet, behind her younger sister. Earlier that year, Steele and her two sisters competed in the Team America Rocketry Challenge in Washington D.C., though they did not place in the competition. Steele currently holds three national records in events A Cluster Altitude (2008), D Eggloft Altitude (2008), and F Streamer Duration (2009).

=== International Level ===
Steele's international career began in 2010. During the summer 2009, fly-offs were held for members of the NAR who want to be part of the International Team at the 18th World Space Modeling Championships. Steele was invited to become a member of the United States World Space Modeling Team, and compete in Vldnik, Serbia in early September 2010, despite not having formally competed for the team. Steele placed 11th in S5 Scale Altitude, though she had the highest recorded altitude in the event. In 2011, Steele was invited to return to the International Team as an assistant team manager, alongside Quest Aerospace's Bill Stine for the junior World Space Modeling Championships team in the 2012 competition in Liptovsky-Mikulas, Slovakia. Steele reprised her position as team manager at the FAI European Championships in Varna, Bulgaria in 2013, as well as in the FAI European Championships in Lviv, Ukraine in 2015, but was unable to return to the FAI World Space Modeling Championships in Lviv, Ukraine in 2016 due to scheduling conflicts.

=== National Event Awards ===
Year	NARAM	Event	Place	Division
2004	NARAM-46	D Eggloft Altitude	1	A Division
2004	NARAM-46	Plastic Model Conversion	3	A Division
2005	NARAM-47	Set Duration (65 sec)	1	A Division
2005	NARAM-47	A Cluster Altitude	3	A Division
2005	NARAM-47	C Streamer Duration Multiround	3	A Division
2005	NARAM-47	D Dual Egg Lofting Duration	3	A Division
2005	NARAM-47	Open Spot Landing	3	A Division
2005	NARAM-47	Plastic Model Conversion	3	A Division
2005	NARAM-47	1/4A Helicopter Duration	4	A Division
2005	NARAM-47	NARAM 47 Meet Champions	4	A Division
2005	NARAM-47	NARAM 47 National Champions	3	A Division
2006	NARAM-48	1/2A Streamer Duration	1	A Division
2006	NARAM-48	Concept Sport Scale	1	A Division
2006	NARAM-48	Research and Development Experimental Determination of Drag Coefficients	1	A Division
2006	NARAM-48	1/4A Parachute Duration Multiround	2	A Division
2006	NARAM-48	F Altitude	2	A Division
2006	NARAM-48	Scale	2	A Division
2006	NARAM-48	B Helicopter Duration	3	A Division
2006	NARAM-48	B Boost Glider Duration Multiround	4	A Division
2006	NARAM-48	B Egg Lofting Duration	4	A Division
2006	NARAM-48	NARAM-48 Meet Champions	2	A Division
2006	NARAM-48	NARAM-48 National Champions	1	A Division
2007	NARAM-49	B Egg Lofting Altitude	1	A Division
2007	NARAM-49	Research and Development Comparison of Parachute Descent Rates	1	A Division
2007	NARAM-49	B Streamer Duration	2	A Division
2007	NARAM-49	C Scale Altitude	2	A Division
2007	NARAM-49	A Boost Glider Duration	4	A Division
2007	NARAM-49	A Helicopter Duration	4	A Division
2007	NARAM-49	NARAM-49 Meet Champions	2	A Division
2007	NARAM-49	NARAM-49 National Champions	2	A Division
2008	NARAM-50	B Streamer Duration Multiround	1	B Division
2008	NARAM-50	D Egg Lofting Altitude	1	B Division
2008	NARAM-50	Scale	1	B Division
2008	NARAM-50	D Boost Glider Duration	3	B Division
2008	NARAM-50	Set Duration (50 sec)	4	B Division
2008	NARAM-50	NARAM-50 National Champions	1	B Division
2008	NARAM-50	NARAM-50 Meet Champions	2	B Division
2009	NARAM-51	Random Altitude (175 m)	2	B Division
2009	NARAM-51	A Streamer Duration	3	B Division
2009	NARAM-51	Peanut Sport Scale	4	B Division
2009	NARAM-51	Research and Development Simulator Accuracy of Low-Powered Models Compared to Actual	4	B Division
2010	NARAM-52	A Cluster Altitude	1	B Division
2010	NARAM-52	D Helicopter Duration	1	B Division
2010	NARAM-52	E Dual Egg Lofting Altitude	2	B Division
2010	NARAM-52	Research and Development Developing a Piston For Cluster Engine Models	2	B Division
2010	NARAM-52	B Streamer Duration	3	B Division
2010	NARAM-52	1/4A Boost Glider Duration	3	B Division
2010	NARAM-52	F Super-Roc Altitude	3	B Division
2010	NARAM-52	Giant Sport Scale	3	B Division
2010	NARAM-52	NARAM-52 Meet Champions	1	B Division
2010	NARAM-52	NARAM-52 National Champions	1	B Division
2011	NARAM-53	1/4A Flex-Wing Boost Glider Duration	1	B Division
2011	NARAM-53	1/8A Streamer Duration Multiround	2	B Division
2011	NARAM-53	Plastic Model Conversion	3	B Division
2011	NARAM-53	NARAM 53 National Champions	2	B Division
