= Random Passage =

1992 novel by Bernice Morgan

- Author: Bernice Morgan
- Language: English
- Publisher: Breakwater Books Ltd
- Publication date: 1992

Random Passage is a 1992 novel by Newfoundland author Bernice Morgan. It was published by Breakwater Books Ltd. of St. John's. It was followed by a sequel, Waiting for Time.

It is a historical novel about the inhabitants of Cape Random, a small outport where survival was dependent on catching and selling fish in exchange for supplies. It is set in colonial Newfoundland over the span of many years.

The main characters include Mary "Bundle" Sprig, Lavinia "Vinnie" Andrews and family, Thomas Hutchings, the Vincents, and the Norris family.

== Television adaptation ==
In 2002, a television miniseries, based on the book and its sequel, aired in Canada on CBC and in Ireland on RTÉ. The production starred Colm Meaney as Thomas Hutchings, Aoife McMahon as Mary "Bundle" Keane and Deborah Pollitt as Lavinia Andrews. The screenplay was written by Des Walsh, with John N. Smith serving as director. It was filmed on location near Trinity, Newfoundland and Labrador, which became a popular tourist spot.
