= Katie Taft =

- Born: 1972 (age 52–53); Boulder, Colorado
- Education: Marylhurst University
- Known for: Photography
- Notable work: Imaginary Friends
- Awards: Westword MasterMind
- Website: https://katietaft.wordpress.com/

Katie Taft is a Denver-based artist, photographer, and teacher. Raised in Boulder, Colorado, she left the state for college, eventually earning her BFA at Marylhurst University in Oregon where she studied photography. She returned to Colorado in 2004. Taft is best known for her Imaginary Friends series of artworks featuring hybrid creature creations photographed in various locations.

== Career ==
Taft's work gained notice for her quirky images exhibited in the Repeat Offenders show at Singer Gallery in 2004. She began her Imaginary Friends series around the same time. In 2006, Taft was selected as a Westword MasterMind, an annual award that comes with a cash award, based on the strength of her Imaginary Friends series. In 2008, Taft was one of ten artists to create commemorative buttons for the 2008 Democratic National Convention. Her button depicted a donkey in a suit standing in front of the sculpture Articulated Wall by Herbert Bayer, along the lines of her imaginary friends images. In 2011 she was invited to curate Flash Gallery's Feminine Influence show, which included 28 mostly Colorado based artists, each of which named women artists who influenced them. In 2012 Taft began curating the Action Figures artist discussion series.

== Imaginary Friends ==
In the Imaginary Friends series, Taft sculpts hybrid creatures and gives them personality traits such as favorite colors, thoughts, or word associations. The resulting sculpture often merge animals and people. She then photographs her creations in the world. The figures display a range of strong emotions such as anguish, grief, and foreboding.

== Exhibitions ==
=== Solo ===
- May 2009 – True Love, Sliding Door Gallery, Denver, Colorado
- December 2007 – Friendzilla, PlatteForum, Denver, Colorado
- July 2006 – Friends of Mine, Cruz Gallery, Santa Fe, New Mexico
- November 2005 – Imaginary Friends V, Genuine Imitation – Portland, Oregon
- October 2004 – Mes Petits Amis, Capsule @ Pod – Denver, Colorado
- August 2004 – Best Friends, Ironton Gallery – Denver, Colorado
- January 2004 – Imaginary Friends III, The Assembly Annex – Denver, Colorado
- October 2002 – Three Dimensions, The Blue Gallery – Gearheart, Oregon

=== Group ===
- February 2011 – Ceramic Soliloquies, Abecedarian Gallery – Denver, Colorado
- May 2010 -Becoming Visible: a Heads of Hydra show, Hinterland – Denver, Colorado
- March 2010 – 2nd Degree of Separation, RedLine – Denver, Colorado
- December 2009 – Delirium, illiterate gallery – Denver, Colorado
- March 2009 – Word Works, Abecedarian Gallery – Denver, Colorado
- January 2009 – Everybody Loves a Train Wreck, Art Students League – Denver, Colorado
- August 2008 – Interweavings, Abecedarian Gallery – Denver, Colorado
- June 2008 – Molten, Space Gallery – Denver, Colorado
- April 2008 – The Simple Truth, Rule Gallery – Denver, Colorado
- December 2006 – Wee – guest artist, Flash Gallery – Lakewood, Colorado
- October 2006 – Random Formulas, Capsule Gallery – Denver, Colorado
- April 2006 – The Food Show, Sliding Door Callery – Denver, CO
- July 2005 – Photography +, Western Center for the Arts – Grand Junction, CO
- May 2005 – Buff Puff, Cruz Gallery – Santa Fe, New Mexico
- April 2005 – Process, Pacific Switchboard – Portland, Oregon
- January 2005 – Hot Trip, Gallery Sink – Denver, Colorado
- January 2005 – Debut, Flash Gallery – Lakewood, Colorado
- August 2005 – Best of Gallery Sovereign, Gallery Sovereign – Boulder, Colorado
- July 2004 – Plush, Capsule – Denver, Colorado
- July 2004 – ZipCo, Emmanuel Gallery, Auraria Campus – Denver, Colorado
- June 2004 – Repeat Offenders, Singer Gallery @ the Mizel Center for the Arts and Culture – Denver, Colorado
- January 2004 – Strange Affinities, Siegfried Gallery, Ohio University – Athens, Ohio November 2003 – Potluck, The Assembly – Denver, Colorado
- July 2003 – New Kids on the Block, The Assembly – Denver, Colorado
- May 2003 – Gallery Sovereign – Boulder, Colorado
- June 2001 – The Art Gym – Portland, Oregon
- July 2000 – Red ’76 Show, Martial Arts Gallery, Portland, Oregon
