= Soil (album) =

Studio album by Serpentwithfeet
- Released: June 8, 2018
- Length: 39:47
- Label: Secretly Canadian; Tri Angle
- Producer: Serpentwithfeet; Clams Casino; Katie Gately; mmph; Paul Epworth

Serpentwithfeet chronology
Blisters (2016)	Soil (2018)	Apparition (2020)

Singles from Soil
- 1. "Bless Ur Heart" Released: March 7, 2018; 2. "Cherubim" Released: May 2, 2018; 3. "Seedless" Released: June 6, 2018

Soil (stylized in all lowercase) is the debut studio album by American singer and songwriter Serpentwithfeet. It was released on June 8, 2018, by Secretly Canadian and Tri Angle.

== Critical reception ==
Professional ratings
Aggregate scores
Source	Rating
AnyDecentMusic?	8.2/10
Metacritic	87/100
Review scores
Source	Rating
AllMusic	4/5 stars
Clash	9/10
DIY	4/5 stars
Exclaim!	7/10
The Observer	4/5 stars
Pitchfork	8.1/10
PopMatters	10/10
Resident Advisor	4.0/5
Rolling Stone	3.5/5 stars
Under the Radar	8/10

Soil received widespread acclaim from critics. On Metacritic, which assigns a normalized rating out of 100 to reviews from mainstream critics, the album received an average score of 87, based on 15 reviews. Dmitry Teckel of Clash described the album as "magical" and called it "presents love as a great ritual of universal joy". Sasha Geffen of Pitchfork said, "With soil, serpentwithfeet deeply engages with the complex membranes between the self and a loved one, the self and the world. Few albums attempt this much nuance in articulating love; Wise's success in his ambitions feels like a gift." Heather Phares of AllMusic gave the album four out of five stars, commented that the album "captures a passionate, complex artist coming into his own." Rachel Finn of DIY called the album as "a return to his roots and a celebration of finally having found his feet." Katherine St. Asaph of Spin gave the album a positive review, calling the album was "full of subtleties: love lost, love mourned, love repurposed." Comparing to his previous work blisters, Stephen Mayne of Under the Radar praised the album to have "richer, dense rhythms and surprising samples", commented that they "wrapped into sensuous tracks detailing love and loss." A. Harmony of Exclaim! called the album as a "courageous effort where serpentwithfeet's bravery pays off."

=== Accolades ===
Year-end lists
Publication	Accolade	Rank	Ref.
The Atlantic	23 Best Albums of 2018	Unranked	
BrooklynVegan	Top 50 Albums of 2018	39	
Dazed	The 20 Best Albums of 2018	19	
Fact	The 50 Best Albums of 2018	12	
The Guardian	50 Best Albums of 2018	45	
The New York Times (Jon Pareles)	The 28 Best Albums of 2018	3	
NPR Music	The 50 Best Albums of 2018	24	
PopMatters	70 Best Albums of 2018	5	
PopMatters	20 Best Avant-Garde and Experimental Albums of 2018	8	
Spin	51 Best Albums of 2018: Staff Picks	43	
Tiny Mix Tapes	Favorite 50 Music Releases of 2018	20	
The Vinyl Factory	50 Favourite Albums of 2018	33	

Awards
Year	Organization	Award	Result	Ref.
2019	A2IM Libera Awards	Album of the Year	Nominated	
2019	A2IM Libera Awards	Best Outlier Album	Nominated	
2019	A2IM Libera Awards	Best R&B Album	Nominated	

== Track listing ==
Credits adapted from Bandcamp.

All tracks are written by Serpentwithfeet, except where noted.

soil
No.	Title	Writer(s)	Producer(s)	Length
1.	"Whisper"	Josiah Wise; Katie Gately	Serpentwithfeet; Gately	4:21
2.	"Messy"		Serpentwithfeet; Clams Casino	3:31
3.	"Wrong Tree"		Serpentwithfeet	3:43
4.	"Fragrant"		Clams Casino; Serpentwithfeet	3:14
5.	"Mourning Song"		Clams Casino; Gately; Serpentwithfeet	3:19
6.	"Cherubim"		Gately; mmph; Serpentwithfeet	3:38
7.	"Seedless"		Clams Casino; Serpentwithfeet	3:29
8.	"Invoice"	Wise; Paul Epworth	Epworth; Serpentwithfeet	4:01
9.	"Waft"		mmph; Gately; Serpentwithfeet	2:48
10.	"Slow Syrup"		Gately; Serpentwithfeet	3:20
11.	"Bless Ur Heart"		Gately; Serpentwithfeet	4:23

Notes

- All track titles are stylized in all lowercase.
