= Katie Bush =

American artist

Katie Bush, known as 'America's Favorite Lady', is a Canadian-born American digital, net, and installation artist. Her work aims to re-evaluate the American Dream in a humorous and satirical way through her use of ready-made clip art. Her work has been exhibited in venues internationally as well as in print and online at Eleven Bulls, Rhizome.org and Scissorkick.com. It has also been featured in BoingBoing, The British Medical Journal, Dazed & Confused, and Art XX. She is San Francisco-based.

== Early life and education ==
Katie Bush was born in Canada in 1972. In 1996, she received a BFA in Photography from the Nova Scotia College of Art and Design in Halifax, Canada and was influenced by the work of Garry Neil Kennedy. Inspired by Kathy Acker and Sharon Grace, she went on to receive an MFA in New Genres from the San Francisco Art Institute in 2000. Referred to as a "modern day digital sweetheart" and "visual terrorist with a heart of gold," Bush has been exhibiting her work internationally since 1993.

== Subject matter ==
Bush has a variety of inspirations for her work including consumerism, the business of war, social (in)equality, and the ongoing cleanliness of chemically-treated suburban carpet areas. In an interview with Digital America, she mentions finding inspiring work, exhibitions, and conversations at CTheory and rhizome.org. Bush explains that she often still finds inspiration for new possibilities within her work from these sites and their archives.

== Major works ==
=== "Destroy Evil" ===
"Destroy Evil" or "Destroyevil.com " is an on-going art website created as a critique of the 2002 'Axis of Evil' speech by George Bush. It was created the night after his speech and its official launch was July 4, 2002. Upon accessing the site, viewers see a calendar that has clickable squares and the message "Evil Has Yet To Come!". The viewer is able to interact with the site by clicking through it to discover an ongoing display of images showing bombs, babies, and medical procedures. Through this interaction, viewers can choose their (evil) adventure and can explore the site in a linear or nonlinear way. All of the animations on the site are white, black, red, and green following a good/evil, stop/go mentality. The scenes depicted through the images aim to question goals of money, power, sex, fame, and the pursuit of happiness and how it is presented in mass media. In her interview with Digital America, Bush explains that "Destroyevil.com is about polarizing patriotic forces and the combative suburban energies that show the most promise to (properly) loop in cyberspace forever". "Destroy Evil" is an ongoing project that Bush continues to add to every month until the entire calendar year is complete. With these additions, Bush includes images and aspects that touch on current sociopolitical events and positions. For example, she uses phrases spoken by Donald Trump and puts them in URLs that redirect to destroyevil.com.

=== "Rapture of the First Fruits" ===
"Rapture of the First Fruits" is "an illuminated panorainbow lady output dedicated to the morally-upright babies of a new tomorrow." In this work, Bush uses psychedelic configurations of pixels among layers of defective plutonium-tipped missiles, minivans, baby heads projectile vomiting American flags, etc to make a statement against the voter-approved ban on gay marriage at the time.

=== "All Systems Go!" ===
"All Systems Go!" was created in 2001. It is a web-art piece that creates discussion about virus, disease and media memes. Users can navigate through this artwork and discover a variety of small animated vignettes that showcase the banality of suburban existence. The various characters Bush includes in her work often share a helplessness and vulnerability, trapped in a continuous loop. Characters in "All Systems Go!" include a trapeze artist dropping his partner, a man in a sitz bath, a baby being ambushed by a red alligator, etc., repeating their mistakes unless they do something bad enough that stops them from doing so.

=== "Seeking to Destroy Families and Faith" (exhibition) ===
"Seeking to Destroy Families and Faith" was an exhibition presented in two parts. The digital prints that make up the exhibition were presented in two separate locations because they were so opposed in their homophobic vs. heterophobic nature. Part A consisted of large format (190 sq. ft.) anti-gay/anti-straight digital prints and was shown at Mojuju Tatu in San Francisco from June 19 to September 1, 2010. Part B was consisted of a minivan-centric anti-family installation that was shown at the ATA Right Window Gallery in San Francisco from July 4 to July 30, 2010. Bush's exhibition was extended through to October 15, 2010 at 2Spirit Tattoo as a 200 sq. ft. display of, as Bush stated, "kaleidoscopic socio-sexual marital mayhem."

=== "Neither Here/Nor There" (exhibition) ===
"Neither Here Nor There" was an exhibition presented at Glama-Rama in San Francisco from February 15 to April 10, 2004. In this show, Bush collected imagery from her online projects: www.destroyevil.com and www.lovekatie.com. She combined this imagery in such a way to showcase comparisons between an excess of shopping and bombing.

=== "You and What Army! Combative Digital Love Squirts by Katie Bush" (exhibition) ===
"You and What Army! Combative Digital Love Squirts by Katie Bush" was an exhibition inspired by out-of-state, church-backed funding of Prop 8 and the voter-approved ban on gay marriage. Included in this show was a large-scale triptych portraying, according to Bush, "an ominous Mormon church aiming nuclear missiles at screaming gay baby heads who projectile vomit color onto...lesbian cheerleaders."

== Exhibitions ==
- DestroyEvil.com July 4, 2002 (current)
- Gold Standards in Dark Times. Spark Arts, San Francisco, Jun. 2017
- Seeking to Destroy Families & Faith PART A, Mojuju Tatu, San Francisco, Jun-Sept. 2010
- Seeking to Destroy Families & Faith PART B, ATA Right Window Gallery, Jul. 2010
- www.lovekatie.com, 1996-2006
- In a World with so many Things, Glama-Rama, San Francisco, Aug. 2005
- Neither Here Nor There, Glama-Rama, San Francisco, Feb. 15-Apr. 10, 2004
- Expected to Stimulate, The Lexington, San Francisco, Jun. 2003
- All Systems Go!, Off-ramp Gallery, NY www.off-ramp.org, Oct. 2001
- Tina and Carl Sell Katie, Fort Mason, San Francisco, 2000
- The Scattering of Katie's Eggs, Easter Sunday, Downtown Toronto, Ontario, 1997
- Kiss my Fence, Again, Anna Leonowen's, Halifax, Canada, 1996
- Memefest 2005 (winner), Slovenija, Jun. 2005
- Fylkingen HZNet, Sweden, #5, Jun. 2005
- Stunned, Net Art Open, Ireland, Jun. 2005
- chico.art.net, the electric arts program, CSU, California, Dec. 2004
- Electrofringe 2004, Newcastle/This is not Art Festival, Australia, Sept.-Oct. 2004
- 6th International Digital Art Exhibition and Colloquium, Centro Cultural, Havana, Cuba, Jun. 2004
- MAF-04, Thailand New Media Art Festival, Bangkok, Mar. 2004
- Hilchot Shchenim-Lows for Neighbors, The Israeli Center for Digital Art, Israel, 2004
- FILE, Electronic Language and International Festival, Brazil, 2003
- SARS Digital Art Exhibit, The SARS PROJECT, 2003
- Peam 2003, Pescara Electronic Artist Meeting, Pescara, Italy, 2003
- Istanbul Museum Web Biennial, Istanbul, Turkey, 2003
- I-Highway - Netart from Canada, Java Museum, Germany, Jun. 2003
- The Timmy Show, Glama-Rama, San Francisco, 2003
- The Wartime Project, 2003, London, Italy, Mexico, U.S.A., Spain, Amsterdam
- Visual Art @ athica.org, A Collection of New Media Artwork, Athens, Georgia, 2003
- NET.FILM, 3rd Biennial Exhibition, ABC No Rio Gallery, NY, 2002
- Don't Ever Change, Tuttle Gallery, Baltimore, MD, 2001
- Suburban Samizdat, Buffalo, NY, Sept., Oct., Dec. 2001-2003
- Wallpapers, Art Gallery of Nova Scotia, Nova Scotia, Canada, 2000
- Graduate MFA Exhibition, Fort Mason, San Francisco, CA, 2000
- Continuing MFA Exhibition, Diego Rivera, San Francisco, CA, 1999
- Intimations, Angell Gallery, Toronto, Ontario, 1999
- Apaware: Cash and Carry, Linz, Austria, 1999
- Art Metropole Auction & Benefit, Christopher Cutts Gallery, Toronto, Ontario, 1997
- www.pfplayground.com, (online/archived), 1997
- Graduating BFA Exhibition, N.S.C.A.D., Nova Scotia, 1996
- Color, Khyber Art Center, Halifax, Nova Scotia, 1995
- Drawings, Anna Leonowen's Gallery, Halifax, Canada, 1994

== Publications ==
- Katie Gets Wet, Art Metropole, Toronto, Ontario, 1998
- Destroy UFO'S!, Halifax, Vancouver, Toronto, Canada, 1993-1997
- Bathhouse Magazine, vol. 1, no. 2, 2002
