= Katie J. Field =

British bioscientist and academic

Katie Jayne Field
- Born: Wiltshire, England
- Education: Durham University; University of Sheffield
- Scientific career
- Workplaces: University of Leeds; University of Sheffield
- Thesis: The Functional Significance of Genetic Diversity in Plants : an Environmental Metabolomics Approach (2008)

Katie Jayne Field is a British bioscientist who is professor of Plant Soil Processes at the University of Sheffield. Her research considers the interactions of plants with fungi and their environment. In 2025, she was named in one of the inaugural cohorts of Royal Society Faraday Discovery Fellows.

== Early life and education ==
Field grew up in Wiltshire, England. Her parents are both keen gardeners, and she became interested in plants at an early age. She earned her undergraduate degree in plant sciences at Durham University, where she was lectured by botanist Phil Gates. She became interested in a career in plant biology, motivated by understanding how plants interact with organisms and their changing environments. She started researching mycorrhiza. She moved to the University of Sheffield for her doctoral research, where she studied genetic diversity in plants. To understand the functional significance of this genetic diversity she used environmental metabolomics. She remained in Sheffield as a postdoctoral researcher, where was supported by Natural Environment Research Council and worked in the Department of Plant Sciences.

== Research and career ==
In 2015, Field moved to the University of Leeds, where she was made an Academic Fellow in Plant Soil. She was awarded a Biotechnology and Biological Sciences Research Council fellowship, and was promoted to associate professor in 2017. She returned to the University of Sheffield as a professor of Plant-Soil Processes in 2020.

Field studies the relationships between plants and soil. She is particularly interested in how plants and fungi interact with each other, and how that influences the behaviour of ecosystems. She looks to apply understanding of the symbiosis between plants and fungi to mitigate challenges such as climate change. She has studied arbuscular mycorrhiza and mucoromycotina ‘fine root endophytes’, which form different relationships with their plant hosts, and both play a critical role in life on earth. Field demonstrated that orchids support their seedlings through underground fungal networks, which explains why common spotted-orchids grow in groups around mature plants.

In 2025, Field was named to one of the inaugural cohorts of Royal Society Faraday Discovery Fellows. As part of her fellowship she will explore how fungi are involved with crop resilience, nutrient absorption and carbon sequestration.

Field is a senior editor for Functional Ecology and deputy editor in chief for Plants, People, Planet.

== Selected publications ==
- One Thousand Plant Transcriptomes Initiative (23 October 2019). "One thousand plant transcriptomes and the phylogenomics of green plants". Nature. 574 (7780): 679–685. doi:10.1038/s41586-019-1693-2. ISSN 1476-4687. PMC 6872490. PMID 31645766. Wikidata Q90911773.
- Thomas J. Thirkell; Michael D. Charters; Ashleigh J. Elliott; Steven M. Sait; Katie J. Field (19 June 2017). "Are mycorrhizal fungi our sustainable saviours? Considerations for achieving food security". Journal of Ecology. 105 (4): 921–929. doi:10.1111/1365-2745.12788. ISSN 0022-0477. Wikidata Q58421152.
- Heidi-Jayne Hawkins; Rachael I.M. Cargill; Michael E. Van Nuland; Stephen C. Hagen; Katie J. Field; Merlin Sheldrake; Nadejda A. Soudzilovskaia; E. Toby Kiers (June 2023). "Mycorrhizal mycelium as a global carbon pool". Current Biology. 33 (11): R560–R573. doi:10.1016/j.cub.2023.02.027. ISSN 0960-9822. PMID 37279689. Wikidata Q119133779.
