= Katie Tallo =

Canadian filmmaker and author

Katie Tallo is a Canadian screenwriter, director, and author.

== Early life ==
Tallo grew up in Ottawa in the Carleton Heights neighbourhood of Nepean. She is a graduate of Carleton University and Algonquin College.

== Career ==
Inspired by her time with Women in the Director's Chair (WIDC) in 1997, Tallo developed a scene from her WIDC workshop into her 1998 short film, See Through. Tallo directed the TV-documentary Juiced for CityTV in 1999. Her first feature film, Posers, premiered in 2002. She both wrote and directed the movie. For ten years, Tallo served on the Creative Women Workshops Association (CWWA) Board of Directors.

In 2020, Tallo's debut novel, Dark August, was published by HarperCollins. Dark August was named a New York Times Editor's Pick. Its sequel, Poison Lilies, was published in 2022. The third book in the installment is to be released on December 3, 2024, titled Buried Road.

== Personal life ==
Tallo lives in Ottawa with her husband and daughter. She also had a dog named Levi, whom she depicted in Dark August.

== Bibliography ==
- Dark August (2020)
- Poison Lilies (2022)
- Buried Road (2024)

== Filmography ==
=== Film ===
Year	Work	Credited as		Notes
Year	Work	Writer	Director	Notes
1998	See Through	Yes	Yes	Short
2002	Posers	Yes	Yes	

=== Television ===
Year	Work	Credited as		Notes
Year	Work	Writer	Director	Notes
1999	Juiced	Yes	Yes	TV documentary
2004	Just Jamie	Yes	No	5 episodes
2010	Rob the Robot	Yes	No	Episode: "Lost and Found"
