= Katie Perry =

Australian fashion designer

Katie Taylor
- Born: Katie Jane Perry; London, England
- Occupation: Fashion designer
- Label: Katie Perry

Katie Jane Taylor (née Perry) is an Australian fashion designer. Her label began in the Paddington Markets, and continued with a shop in Sydney.

== Life and career ==
Perry was born in Camden, London, England. In early years, after the separation of her parents, she traveled with her mother and her mother's partner, and lived on four continents (Asia, Europe, Africa and Australia). She now lives in Sydney.

Her mother worked closely with the Benetton brothers before launching her own label in the 1970s, dressing those such as Diana, Princess of Wales and Paul McCartney.

Perry studied at FBI Fashion College in Glebe, Sydney. She chose to have the collection made in Australia, using Australian jersey fabric.

In September 2008, Perry submitted a trademark application for her label, which was formally approved as trademark number 1264761 in the Australian Official Journal of Trademarks, on 29 January 2009. In June 2009, she launched the Katie Perry Studio in Mosman, a suburb of Sydney.

== Name conflict ==
In June 2009, a Brisbane firm of intellectual property lawyers, Fisher Adams Kelly, acting for the American singer Katy Perry, applied to IP Australia to oppose the new trademark, on the basis of a similarity of names. A hearing with IP Australia was called for 10 July 2009, at which they were to seek an extension of the normal three-month time limit within which they may oppose a new trademark.

Some media reports have described this application as a "lawsuit". However, the application to IP Australia is not a lawsuit, and Katy Perry has denied the reports of lawsuits on her blog.

On 29 June 2009, Katie Perry posted a personal message to Katy Perry the singer as a video on YouTube, seeking to get past the lawyers and interact directly between the two Perrys, asking that they can both pursue their dreams and wishing the singer well for her upcoming Australian tour. At a hearing with IP Australia on 10 July 2009, the singer's legal team withdrew their opposition to the Katie Perry trademark.

In October 2019, Perry initiated legal proceedings against the singer for trade mark infringement in Australia. Perry claims that the singer has ignored her rights in respect of her registered Australian trade mark, and despite being fully aware of those rights, the singer has been using "Katy Perry" as a trade mark in Australia to sell clothes and other goods of the same description. Katie Perry alleged that the singer's mark "Katy Perry" is substantially identical or deceptively similar to her mark "Katie Perry" which is registered in class 25 for clothes, and thus, that the singer has infringed her registered trade mark.

In April 2023, the Federal Court of Australia published its decision in which it found the singer infringed on the Katie Perry trademark in Australia. On 14 June 2023, it was reported that Katy Perry and her firms filed their appeal relating to the decision. On 22 November 2024, Katy won her appeal to the Full Court of the Federal Court of Australia, with Katie's trademark potentially being canceled.

However, in March 2026 the High Court of Australia upheld the conclusion that Katy Perry had persistently violated Katie's trademark. In a majority decision, the High Court found that Katie's trademark was not likely to harm the singer's reputation or cause confusion, and costs were awarded to Katie.
