= Orion Sun =

American singer

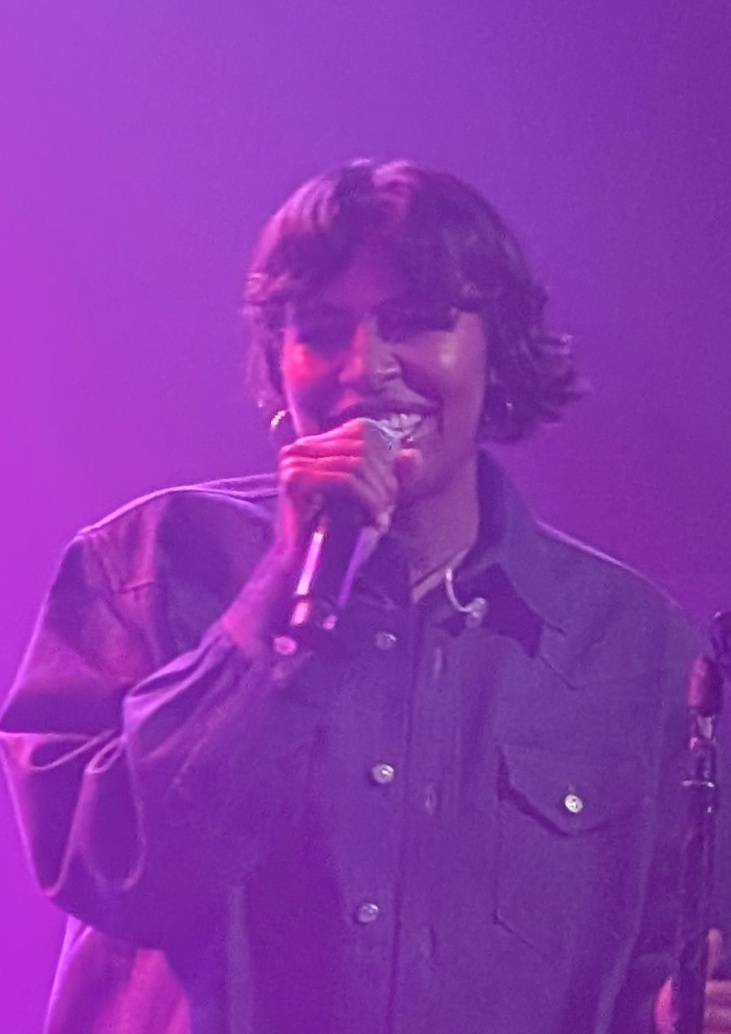
- Orion Sun in 2024

Background information
- Born: Tiffany Maureen Majette; Mount Laurel, New Jersey, U.S.
- Genres: Indie rock; jazz; R&B; hip hop
- Occupations: Singer; songwriter; multi-instrumentalist; record producer
- Years active: 2013–present
- Label: Mom + Pop
- Website: www.orionsun.space

Tiffany Maureen Majette, known professionally as Orion Sun, is an American singer-songwriter, multi-instrumentalist, and producer. Originally from New Jersey, Majette is currently based on the West Coast.

== Early life ==
Tiffany Majette was born and raised in Mount Laurel, New Jersey in a conservative Christian home. She grew up in a neighborhood named after civil rights activist Ethel Lawrence. At an early age, Majette was inspired by the music at the Bethany Baptist Church. Majette began songwriting at Lenape High School and was encouraged by her choir teacher to share her music more widely. Although she was accepted into Berklee College of Music, Majette was not able to attend for financial reasons.

== Career ==
Majette's first job was working as a camp counselor for the YMCA where she led music extracurriculars.

In Philadelphia, Majette became involved in an underground music collective called The Forest, until the death of a member caused the collective to disband.

Majette posted her first song, "Voicemail," to YouTube in 2013. She released the mixtape A Collection of Fleeting Moments and Daydreams in 2017. In 2018, Orion Sun released singles S T R E T C H and Nirvanaaa. Her debut LP, Hold Space for Me, was released in 2020 with Mom + Pop. In his review for Pitchfork, the critic Dani Blum wrote that the album was "stark [and] lightly poetic."

In 2020, after being injured by police at a racial justice protest in her hometown, Majette wrote the song "Mama's Baby." She raised over $18,000 from the song's sales on Bandcamp and donated the funds to Breonna Taylor's GoFundMe and the Loveland Foundation.

In 2022, Orion Sun released her debut EP, Getaway, which featured production and writing from Rostam Batmanglij, Nascent, Rodaidh McDonald, and Guapdad 4000. In 2023, she opened for Daniel Caesar for his Superpowers World Tour. In 2024, Orion Sun release two singles "Already Gone"and "Mary Jane." Her self-titled LP, Orion, was released on September 20, 2024, followed by her tour, The Rising Sun Tour.

== Musical style and influences ==
Orion Sun makes music within the realms of alternative R&B and indie rock. As a songwriter, Majette explores themes of love, grief, isolation, and insecurity. Her influences include Nina Simone, Billie Holiday, and Ella Fitzgerald.

== Personal life ==
Majette is a queer Black woman. She was kicked out of her home due to her sexuality.

== Discography ==
=== Studio albums ===
- Hold Space for Me (2020)
- Orion (2024)

=== EPs ===
- Getaway (2022)

=== Singles ===
- "Sweetest Thing" (2017)
- "So Tall From Down Here" (2017)
- "Journal Entry" (2017)
- "Nirvanaaa" (2017)
- "S T R E T C H" (2018)
- "concrete" (2021)
- "dirty dancer" (2022)
- "dirty dancer - A COLORS SHOW" (2022)
- "Already Gone" (2024)
- "Mary Jane" (2024)

=== Compilations ===
- A Collection of Fleeting Moments and Daydreams (2017)
