= Eagle Eye (soundtrack) =

Eagle Eye (Original Motion Picture Soundtrack)

Film score by Brian Tyler
- Released: September 30, 2008
- Studio: Sony Scoring Stage, Culver City, California
- Genre: Film score
- Length: 77:29
- Label: Varèse Sarabande
- Producer: Brian Tyler

Brian Tyler chronology
Bangkok Dangerous (2008)	Eagle Eye (2008)	The Lazarus Project (2009)

Eagle Eye (Original Motion Picture Soundtrack) is the soundtrack to the 2008 film of the same name directed by D.J. Caruso. The score is composed by Brian Tyler who recorded the score at the Sony Scoring Stage in Sony Pictures Studios, Culver City, California. The score was released by Varèse Sarabande on September 30, 2008.

== Background ==
Tyler called the story as "cool" when Steven Spielberg developed the project twenty years ago under his direction, but never materialized. Since the contemporary society caught with the idea of the story, he felt it more real than science-fiction. When he discussed the story with Caruso and Alex Kurtzman (the producer) about the drive of the score, he felt it something right about the story that suit his type and wanted to score the film from the onset. Tyler recalled in an interview to Billboard recalled that the music sounded like the collaboration of Alfred Hitchcock and Bernard Herrmann collaborating on a film made from the 21st century, where the film got the classic kind of storytelling style—the man on the run—set in a modern era and also had several interesting characters and being unknown about their motives, he came up with few unique sounds. He added that scoring the film was doing several different albums at once.

Tyler further recorded the score at the Sony Scoring Stage with an 88-piece orchestra from Hollywood Studio Symphony performing. Over 140 pre-recorded elements were used in the score performed by Tyler on drums, guitar and piano from Steinway & Sons. He further had drums, drum kits, guitars, vibrophones, glockenspiels. He further brought instruments from Morocco, such as percussion, electric cellos, taiko drums, that were mixed with marching drums to give a sense of propulsion. The mixing process was "difficult" for Tyler, as the album had several tracks and the number of instruments to mix down would be towards 300. Physically, he had to write each part for every instrument, since over 108 minutes of music had been recorded, he written over thousands of pages of music.

The session was interrupted by the Chino Hills earthquake on July 29, 2008—a recording of the quake hitting the scoring stage was released online on the ScoringSessions.com website. Varèse Sarabande released the score on September 30, 2008, four days after the film's release.

== Track listing ==
No.	Title	Length
1.	"Eagle Eye"	4:36
2.	"Eagle Eye Main Title"	3:53
3.	"Final Manipulations"	4:28
4.	"Escape"	4:19
5.	"Honor"	2:59
6.	"Chutes"	2:43
7.	"Ladders"	3:42
8.	"Ariia"	4:58
9.	"Dead End Clues"	2:38
10.	"Loss of a Twin"	1:54
11.	"Clutch Then Shift"	6:25
12.	"Picking Up the Trail"	2:47
13.	"The 36th Floor"	2:00
14.	"The Case"	3:11
15.	"Copyboy"	1:54
16.	"Special Delivery"	2:55
17.	"Hidden Message"	2:42
18.	"Further Instructions"	1:53
19.	"In Jection"	2:07
20.	"Operation Guillotine"	6:21
21.	"Potus 111"	6:34
22.	"Eagle Eye End Title"	2:30
Total length:		77:29

== Reception ==
James Southall of Movie Wave complimented Tyler's music as "great" but has been "ruined with ridiculous album presentation". Thomas Glorieux of Main Titles criticised the album as "relentless, overlong, basically half of the music is the same and the album is put out of film order." Filmtracks.com wrote "though, unless you're a fan of this very specific, predictable sound for the contemporary techno-thriller, then you'll be left only appreciating the merits of Tyler's complicated rendering while the uncompromising tone unwittingly gives you a headache. You can't really fault Tyler for providing this music for such an appropriate match on screen, but he has the ability to take these sounds to another level of intrigue without simply cranking up the intensity of his constructs and laying on the volume. In terms of substance, it's fine; in style points, it fails to impress."

== Credits ==
Credits adapted from CD liner notes:

- Brian Tyler – composer, producer, orchestra conductor, recording, mixing, bass, cello, drums, guitar, percussion, piano
- Keith Power – additional music, programming, bass, guitar
- Stuart Thomas – programming
- Todd Haberman – programming
- Joel Iwataki – recording
- Adam Michalak – recording
- Patricia Sullivan Fourstar – mastering
- Jordan Corngold – editing
- Joe Lisanti – editing
- The Hollywood Studio Symphony – orchestra
- Andrew Kinney – orchestration
- Brad Warnaar – orchestration
- Dana Niu – orchestration
- Jeff Toyne – orchestration
- Robert Elhai – orchestration
- Peter Rotter – orchestra contractor
- Sandy De Crescent – orchestra contractor
- Eric Stonerook – copyist
- Robert Townson – executive producer
- Gary L. Krause – supervisor
- Pakk Hui – musical assistance
