= The Gordin Cell =

Israeli television series

- תא גורדין
- Genre: Psychological thriller Serial drama
- Created by: Ron Leshem; Daniel Syrkin; Amit Cohen; Giora Yahalom
- Developed by: Ron Leshem; Amit Cohen
- Starring: Ran Danker; Mark Ivanir; Elena Yaralova; Slava Bibergal; Neta Riskin; Moni Moshonov; Aviv Alush
- Composer: Arkadi Duchin
- Country of origin: Israel
- Original languages: Hebrew; Russian
- No. of seasons: 2
- No. of episodes: 22

Production
- Executive producer: Asaf Gordon
- Production location: Tel Aviv
- Running time: 40–45 minutes
- Production companies: Tedi Enterprises & Productions yes

Original release
- Network: yes
- Release: January 4, 2012

The Gordin Cell (Hebrew: תא גורדין) is an Israeli psychological thriller series. The series stars Ran Danker as Israeli Air Force officer Eyal Gordin and Mark Ivanir as Russian Foreign Intelligence Service (SVR) agent Yaakov Lundin.

== Plot ==
=== Season 1 ===
Diana and Mickey Gordin immigrated to Israel from the Soviet Union in the 1990s and adjusted in Israel, as they join the upper middle class. In fact, both were recruited by the KGB to collect information for the organization, but that was a decade ago.

Since then it has been many years, but their past haunts them again. Their liaison agent, the legendary spy Yaacov Lundin, is back. He demands from them to transfer under his service their young son Eyal, an outstanding ex-officer of Unit 669, who serves now in the office of the Israeli Air Force commander. While they try to escape from their past, Shin Bet's Russian Department closes in on them, and Eyal himself struggles with the dilemma of becoming a traitor of the country he swore to serve and protect or betraying his family.

=== Season 2 ===
Two years after the events of the previous season, Eyal Gordin is a released prisoner and his parents live in a town in Moscow Oblast in Russia. Members of the Russian Department of Shin Bet, who retired from office, returned to service in order to track down Natalia Gordin, having wiped out the deputy head of Mossad. Meanwhile, Natalia works closely with a Muslim assassin of Argentine origin while holding secret operation, under the nose of people from the Russian Foreign Intelligence Service and the Mossad. Eyal, freed from prison, must work with the Israelis in order to help the Israeli intelligence to find his sister and again finds himself in an internal dilemma: whether to betray his family and give away his sister to the state authorities or do nothing?

== Cast ==
=== Main cast ===
- Ran Danker as Eyal "Alik" Gordin, an Israeli Air Force officer, who is forced to work for the Russian Intelligence.
- Elena Yerlova as Diana Gordin, Eyal's mother and former spy.
- Slava Bibergal as Mikhail "Miki" Gordin, Eyal's father and former IAI worker.
- Neta Riskin as Nathalia Gordin aka Nati Ganot, Eyal's sister, spy for the Russians and for Yaakov Lundin.
- Mark Ivanir as Yaakov "Yasha" Lundin, Russian spy and the enemy of Gordin family.
- Moni Moshonov as Peter Yom-Tov, an old Bulgarian-Jewish Shabak agent.
- Aviv Alush as Ofir Rider, young Shabak agent, Yom-Tov's partner.
- Hadar Ratzon-Rotem as Keren Falakh, Mossad agent. Head of cover operation to track down Eyal's sister.
- Svetlana Narbayeva as Grandmother Nina, Diana Gordin's mother.
- Ishai Golan as Aharal'e Nir (S2)

== Foreign adaptations ==
=== American version ===
In 2012, NBC purchased the broadcasting rights in U.S., and NBC approved the shooting of the pilot for the American version, which was expected to be called "M.I.C.E" (Money, Ideology, Coercion & Ego) but the pilot was not brought to series.. Later the pilot for TV series called Allegiance was ordered by NBC as an adaptation for the Israeli show.

Allegiance tells the story of Alex O'Connor, a young idealistic CIA analyst specializing in Russian affairs, whose close-knit, affluent family is about to be split apart when it is revealed that his parents, Mark and Katya, are covert Russian spies deactivated years ago. But now the Kremlin has re-enlisted them into service as they plan a terrorist operation inside the U.S. border that will bring America to its knees.

Years ago, Russian-born Katya was tasked by the KGB to recruit American businessman Mark O'Connor as a spy and the two fell in love. A deal was struck: as long as Katya remained an asset for Russia, and it was agreed that her services could be called on in the future, she would be allowed to marry Mark and move to the United States of America. After years in the United States building a happy life and without word from Moscow, they thought they had escaped. Now it seems that the new Mother Russia has one more mission - turning Alex into a spy. For these anguished parents, the choice is clear: betray their country or risk their family.

The cast of the series includes Margarita Levieva, Gavin Stenhouse, Hope Davis, Scott Cohen, Morgan Spector, Annie Ilonzeh, Alexandra Peters and Kenneth Choi. Writer-director George Nolfi serves as executive producer with Avi Nir, Ron Leshem, Amit Cohen, Yona Wisenthal and Giora Yahalom. The TV series is a production of Universal Television, Keshet Media and Yes!.

=== Russian version ===
In April 2013, the series was sold to J.I.T.V Productions in Russia. The Russian version was planned to be developed in cooperation with Sreda Productions based on the signed development deal.

=== South Korean version ===
The South Korean adaptation titled SPY aired on KBS2 in 2015, starring Kim Jae-joong, Bae Jong-ok and Yu Oh-seong. Although based on The Gordin Cell, the Korean drama was tailored to the current North-South Korean political conflict.
