= Phoenix Gold Mine =

Gold mine in Colorado

Phoenix Gold Mine Idaho Springs, Colorado.
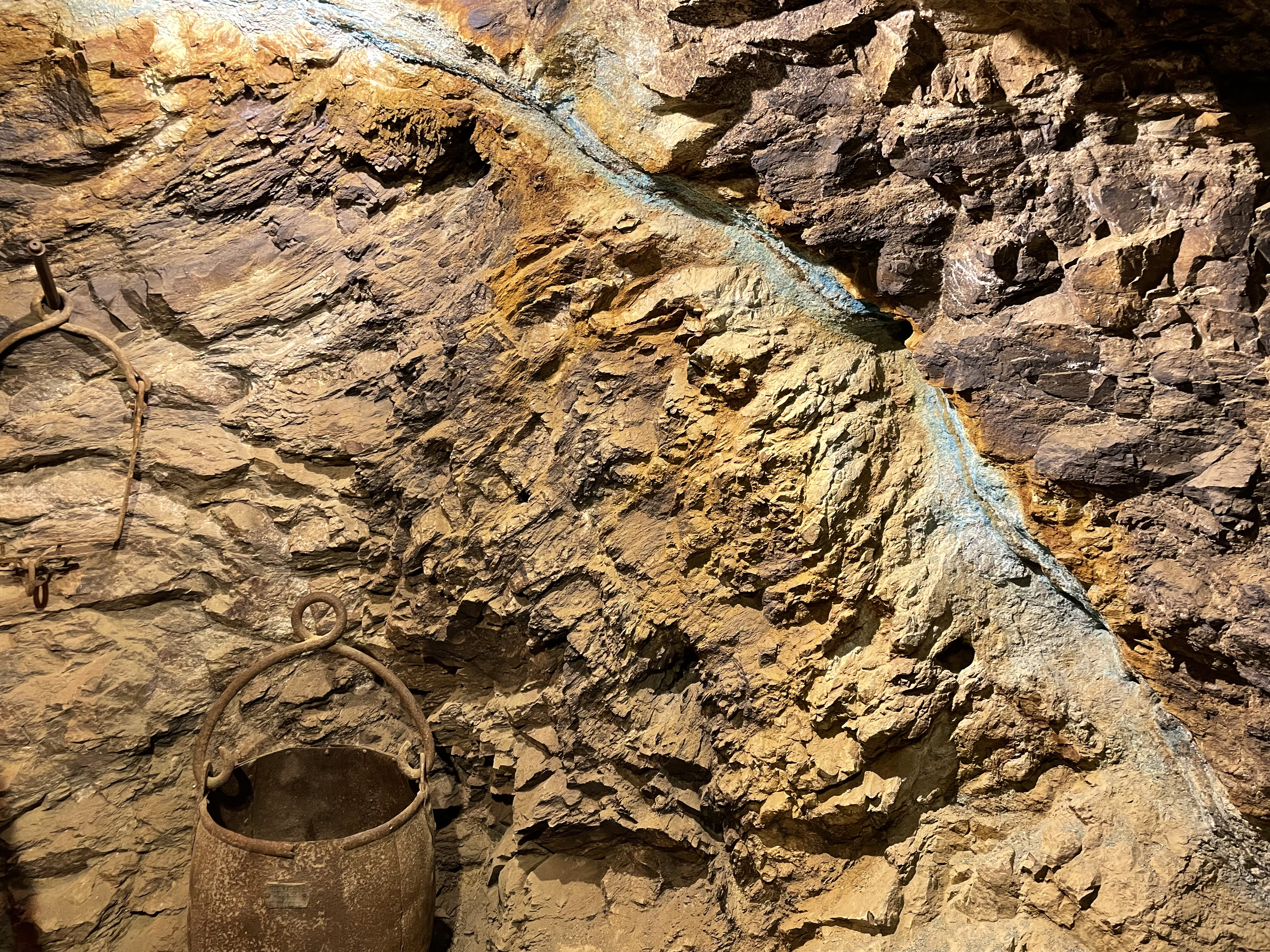
- High grade gold ore at Phoenix Gold Mine.
- Interactive map of Phoenix Gold Mine; Idaho Springs, Colorado.
- Location: Clear Creek County, Colorado, United States; 39°44′56″N 105°33′57″W
- Discovered: 1871
- Active: 1871-1914, 1934-1941, 1943-1960, 1974-1988
- Company: Al Mosch (1930-2019), Dave Mosch (1960-)

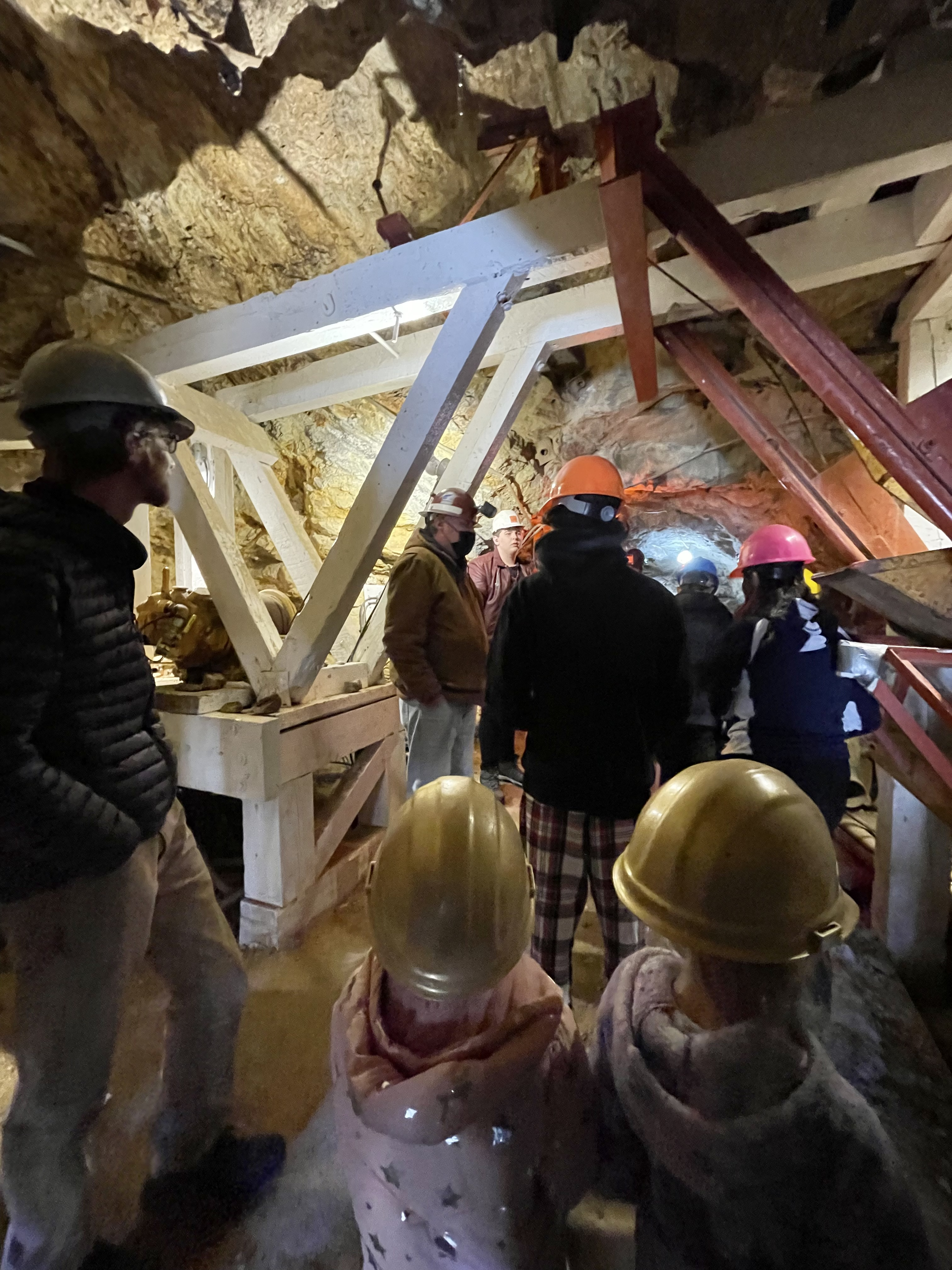
Tour at Phoenix Gold Mine, Idaho Springs, Colorado.

The Phoenix Gold Mine is an underground gold mine tour in Clear Creek County, Colorado that highlights geology, history, hard-rock mining and extraction techniques for visitors. The tour also follows the remains of two gold veins. Since 1968, Phoenix Gold Mine has been family owned and operated.

== History ==
=== Early Operations ===
The Phoenix Gold Mine is located in Clear Creek County, Colorado, and was first officially recorded on August 7, 1871, when a lode claim was filed by a group of prospectors that included Horace Chase and George B. Miner. Early surface exposures of ore proved to be low grade, and the claim changed ownership several times as prospectors sought quicker returns elsewhere.

Later in 1871, the claim was purchased for approximately $5,000 by a small group of Cornish miners from Cornwall, England, often referred to as “Cousin Jacks.” Though limited in financial resources, the miners were experienced hard-rock specialists and believed that a valuable vein existed beneath the unpromising surface outcrop. With backing from an outside investor, they began driving a tunnel from the level of the existing wagon road and railroad grade (near the route of present-day Interstate 70). After advancing roughly 1,000 feet by hand drilling, the miners encountered ore of limited value, causing the investor to reconsider further funding.

Securing additional financial support, the miners extended the tunnel another 1,000 feet into the mountain, where they intersected a rich gold vein. This discovery established the Phoenix as a productive hard-rock mine. The mine remained in operation for several decades and was worked continuously until World War I, when material shortages, governmental demands, and economic conditions led to its closure.

=== Operations after World War I ===
The Phoenix Gold Mine experienced a resurgence in 1934 when the price of gold was raised to $35 an ounce under President Franklin D. Roosevelt’s New Deal policies, prompting many small mines in the Idaho Springs area to reopen. In 1936, the Phoenix was acquired by the Phoenix Trail Mining Company and worked by sub-leased miners, who reportedly encountered rich ore on the main level. Following a fire that destroyed the company mill, disputes arose over lease rights and ore extraction.

In 1941, the U.S. government ordered gold and silver mines to cease operations to prioritize minerals needed for World War II, and the Phoenix, like many others, was temporarily closed.

After the war, two farmers from the Midwest, the Gundersons, purchased the mine for $5,000, reportedly after the property was misrepresented as more valuable than it appeared. Lacking mining experience, they hired former miner Earl Cronk as a consultant. Following his advice to tunnel directly from the road level, the new operation intersected a rich section of the Phoenix Vein about 150 feet in. The mine proved highly productive, with stopes yielding significant quantities of gold. The vein widened to approximately 11 feet at deeper levels, allowing the Gundersons to extract several million dollars’ worth of gold.

=== Modern Discovery and Operations ===
In 1968, Al Mosch purchased the Phoenix Mine with the intention of extracting remaining ore from the support pillars and eventually selling the land for development. In 1974, his children, David and Cyndi Mosch, made a significant discovery while prospecting near the known Phoenix vein. Assaying of the new ore revealed gold concentrations of 1 to 3 ounces per ton, indicating the presence of a previously unidentified vein, later named the Resurrection Vein.

Following this discovery, Al and David Mosch developed the vein by driving a winze and tunneling into the footwall, confirming rich ore with initial assays exceeding 2 ounces of gold per ton. Despite the high-grade ore, small-scale operations were initially limited by smelter requirements, which demanded large quantities of concentrated ore for economic processing.

While attending the New Mexico Institute of Mining and Technology, David Mosch collaborated with Professor Michael Harris to develop new processing methods that allowed the Phoenix ore to be refined efficiently. In 1985, the Mosch family resumed mining operations, using a pay-as-you-go financial model without outside investment or debt. The mine later expanded to include tours in 1988, which provided operational capital and allowed further exploration.

== Appearances ==
=== Ghost Adventures ===
The Phoenix Gold Mine was featured in the Ghost Adventures episode “Colorado Gold Mine,” in which the paranormal investigation series’ crew explored reports of paranormal activity in the mine; the episode aired on September 24, 2016.

=== Dude Perfect ===
In 2019, the Phoenix Gold Mine was featured in the YouTube video “Metal Detector Battle 2” by Dude Perfect, in which the group conducted a metal detecting challenge on the property.

=== Reclaimed ===
The Phoenix Gold Mine was featured on the Discovery Channel reality series Reclaimed, hosted by Alex Charvat and Kevin Gilman, during the episode Poor Man's Mine which follows mining experts as they assess and revive dormant mining claims and aired as part of the network’s Off the Grid programming in January 2020.

=== Elevation (film) ===
The Phoenix Gold Mine was featured as a filming location in the 2024 American post-apocalyptic action thriller film Elevation, directed by George Nolfi and starring Anthony Mackie, Morena Baccarin, and Maddie Hasson. The film was released in the United States on November 8, 2024.
