= List of SEAL Team episodes =

SEAL Team is an American military action drama television series created for CBS and Paramount+ by Benjamin Cavell. The series is produced by CBS Studios, with Cavell serving as showrunner. The series stars David Boreanaz, Max Thieriot, Jessica Paré, Neil Brown Jr., A. J. Buckley, Toni Trucks and Judd Lormand joined the principal cast in later seasons. The series premiered on September 27, 2017.

On May 9, 2019, CBS renewed the series for a third season, which premiered on October 2, 2019. On May 6, 2020, CBS renewed the series for a fourth season which premiered on December 2, 2020. In May 2021, the series was renewed for a fifth season and will be moving to Paramount+. The fifth season premiered on October 10, 2021. On February 1, 2022, Paramount+ renewed the series for a sixth season which premiered on September 18, 2022. On January 18, 2023, Paramount+ renewed the series for a seventh season. On November 15, 2023, it was announced that the seventh season is going to be the final season. The seventh and final premiered on August 11, 2024, with two new episodes and the rest debuting on a weekly basis.

== Series overview ==
Season	Episodes		Originally released		
Season	Episodes		First released	Last released	Network
1	22		September 27, 2017	May 16, 2018	CBS
2	22		October 3, 2018	May 22, 2019	CBS
3	20		October 2, 2019	May 6, 2020	CBS
4	16		December 2, 2020	May 26, 2021	CBS
5	14	4	October 10, 2021	October 31, 2021	CBS
5	14	10	November 1, 2021	January 23, 2022	Paramount+
6	10		September 18, 2022	November 20, 2022	Paramount+
7	10		August 11, 2024	October 6, 2024	Paramount+

== Episodes ==
=== Season 1 (2017–18) ===
No. overall	No. in season	Title	Directed by	Written by	Original release date	Prod. code	U.S. viewers (millions)
1	1	"Tip of the Spear (Pilot)"	Christopher Chulack	Benjamin Cavell	September 27, 2017	ST101	9.88
2	2	"Other Lives"	Christopher Chulack	Benjamin Cavell	October 4, 2017	ST102	8.39
3	3	"Boarding Party"	Christopher Chulack	Spencer Hudnut	October 11, 2017	ST103	8.02
4	4	"Ghosts of Christmas Future"	Larry Teng	Benjamin Cavell & Daniele Nathanson	October 18, 2017	ST104	7.11
5	5	"Collapse"	Ian Toynton	Becky Mode	October 25, 2017	ST105	6.92
6	6	"The Spinning Wheel"	Melanie Mayron	Joseph Sawyer & Julian Silver & Reiss Clausen-Wolf & Beth Schacter	November 8, 2017	ST106	6.22
7	7	"Borderlines"	Félix Alcalá	Corinne Marrinan	November 15, 2017	ST107	7.24
8	8	"The Exchange"	John Dahl	Sabrina Almeida & Spencer Hudnut	November 22, 2017	ST108	6.94
9	9	"Rolling Dark"	Michael Watkins	Daniele Nathanson & Brian Horiuchi	December 6, 2017	ST109	6.90
10	10	"Pattern of Life"	Christopher Chulack	Corinne Marrinan	January 3, 2018	ST110	5.86
11	11	"Containment"	Andy Wolk	Beth Schacter	January 10, 2018	ST111	6.17
12	12	"The Upside Down"	J. Michael Muro	Spencer Hudnut & John Bellucci	January 17, 2018	ST112	6.67
13	13	"Getaway Day"	Christopher Chulack	Benjamin Cavell & Ed Redlich & John Bellucci	January 31, 2018	ST113	6.65
14	14	"Call Out"	Christopher Chulack	Beth Schacter	February 28, 2018	ST114	4.97
15	15	"No Man's Land"	Ian Toynton	John Bellucci & Corinne Marrinan	March 7, 2018	ST115	6.07
16	16	"Never Get Out of the Boat"	J. Michael Muro	Spencer Hudnut & Mark Semos	March 21, 2018	ST116	6.36
17	17	"In Name Only"	John Dahl	Brian Horiuchi & Sabrina Almeida	March 28, 2018	ST117	6.48
18	18	"Credible Threat"	Ruben Garcia	Valerie Armstrong & Josef Sawyer	April 11, 2018	ST118	6.24
19	19	"Takedown"	Holly Dale	Julian Silver & Reiss Clauson-Wolf & Beth Schacter	April 25, 2018	ST119	6.26
20	20	"Enemy of My Enemy"	Larry Teng	John Bellucci & Corinne Marrinan	May 2, 2018	ST120	5.89
21	21	"The Graveyard of Empires"	David Boreanaz	Ed Redlich & Spencer Hudnut	May 9, 2018	ST121	6.15
22	22	"The Cost of Doing Business"	Larry Teng	Benjamin Cavell	May 16, 2018	ST122	6.14

=== Season 2 (2018–19) ===
No. overall	No. in season	Title	Directed by	Written by	Original release date	Prod. code	U.S. viewers (millions)
23	1	"Fracture"	Christopher Chulack	John Glenn & Spencer Hudnut	October 3, 2018	ST201	5.02
24	2	"Never Say Die"	Nelson McCormick	Jon Worley	October 10, 2018	ST203	5.46
25	3	"The Worst of Conditions"	Christopher Chulack	Holly Harold	October 17, 2018	ST202	5.40
26	4	"All That Matters"	Gonzalo Amat	Duppy Demetrius	October 24, 2018	ST204	5.38
27	5	"Say Again Your Last"	Silver Tree	Dana Greenblatt	October 31, 2018	ST205	5.33
28	6	"Hold What You Got"	Kenneth Fink	Spencer Hudnut & Mark Semos	November 7, 2018	ST206	5.61
29	7	"Outside the Wire"	J. Michael Muro	John Glenn & Julian Silver & Reiss Clauson-Wolf	November 14, 2018	ST207	5.17
30	8	"Parallax"	Jann Turner	Holly Harold & Teresa Huang	November 21, 2018	ST208	5.93
31	9	"Santa Muerte"	Larry Teng	John Glenn & Jon Worley	December 5, 2018	ST209	5.31
32	10	"Prisoner's Dilemma"	Thomas Carter	Tom Mularz & Jon Worley	December 12, 2018	ST210	6.59
33	11	"Backwards in High Heels"	Ruben Garcia	Holly Harold & Dana Greenblatt	January 2, 2019	ST211	6.23
34	12	"Things Not Seen"	Michael Watkins	Teleplay by : Kenny Ryan & Jacob Roman; Story by : Kenny Ryan & Jacob Roman & Tom Mularz	January 9, 2019	ST212	5.57
35	13	"Time to Shine"	Christopher Chulack	John Glenn & Spencer Hudnut & Mark Semos	January 23, 2019	ST213	5.08
36	14	"What Appears to Be"	Holly Dale	Brian Beneker	March 20, 2019	ST214	4.89
37	15	"You Only Die Once"	J. Michael Muro	Julian Silver & Reiss Clauson-Wolf	March 27, 2019	ST215	3.91
38	16	"Dirt, Dirt, Gucci"	Holly Dale	John Glenn & Jon Worley	April 3, 2019	ST216	3.73
39	17	"Paradise Lost"	Allison Liddi-Brown	Tom Mularz	April 10, 2019	ST217	4.44
40	18	"Payback"	Guy Ferland	Dana Greenblatt & Teresa Huang	April 17, 2019	ST218	4.59
41	19	"Medicate and Isolate"	Ruben Garcia	Spencer Hudnut & Kenny Ryan & Jacob Roman	April 24, 2019	ST219	3.90
42	20	"Rock Bottom"	Michael Watkins	Holly Harold & Mark H. Semos	May 1, 2019	ST220	4.68
43	21	"My Life for Yours"	David Boreanaz	John Glenn & Spencer Hudnut	May 8, 2019	ST221	4.13
44	22	"Never Out of the Fight"	Christopher Chulack	John Glenn & Spencer Hudnut	May 22, 2019	ST222	4.24

=== Season 3 (2019–20) ===
No. overall	No. in season	Title	Directed by	Written by	Original release date	Prod. code	U.S. viewers (millions)
45	1	"Welcome to the Refuge"	Christopher Chulack	John Glenn & Spencer Hudnut	October 2, 2019	ST301	5.25
46	2	"Ignore and Override"	Christopher Chulack	John Glenn & Spencer Hudnut	October 9, 2019	ST302	4.77
47	3	"Theory and Methodology"	Ruben Garcia	Holly Harold	October 16, 2019	ST303	4.47
48	4	"The Strength of the Wolf"	Allison Liddi-Brown	John Glenn & Kenny Ryan & Jacob Roman	October 23, 2019	ST305	4.49
49	5	"All Along the Watchtower: Part 1"	Alexis Ostrander	Tom Mularz	October 30, 2019	ST306	4.40
50	6	"All Along the Watchtower: Part 2"	Ruben Garcia	Dana Greenblatt	November 6, 2019	ST307	4.52
51	7	"The Ones You Can't See"	Ruben Garcia	Dana Greenblatt	November 20, 2019	ST304	4.69
52	8	"Danger Crossing"	Michael Watkins	Holly Harold	November 27, 2019	ST308	5.77
53	9	"Kill or Cure"	Gonzalo Amat	Tom Mularz	December 4, 2019	ST309	5.44
54	10	"Unbecoming an Officer"	Tyler Grey	Dana Greenblatt	December 11, 2019	ST310	5.85
55	11	"Siege Protocol: Part 1"	Gonzalo Amat	Matt Bosack	February 26, 2020	ST311	4.33
56	12	"Siege Protocol: Part 2"	Gonzalo Amat	Kenny Sheard	February 26, 2020	ST313	3.97
57	13	"Fog of War"	Christopher Chulack	Spencer Hudnut & Mark H. Semos	March 4, 2020	ST312	4.59
58	14	"Objects in Mirror"	David Cook	Tom Mularz	March 11, 2020	ST314	4.91
59	15	"Rules of Engagement"	J. Michael Muro	Holly Harold & Kenny Ryan & Jacob Roman	March 18, 2020	ST315	4.92
60	16	"Last Known Location"	Larry Teng	Stephen Gasper & Dana Greenblatt	March 25, 2020	ST316	5.10
61	17	"Drawdown"	Max Thieriot	Matt Bosack & Mark H. Semos	April 8, 2020	ST317	4.89
62	18	"Edge of Nowhere"	Christine Moore	Rashaan Dozier-Escalante & Tom Mularz	April 22, 2020	ST318	5.82
63	19	"In The Blind"	Allison Liddi-Brown	Corinne Marrinan & Kenny Ryan & Jacob Roman	April 29, 2020	ST319	5.75
64	20	"No Choice in Duty"	Ruben Garcia	Holly Harold & Brian Beneker	May 6, 2020	ST320	4.54

=== Season 4 (2020–21) ===
No. overall	No. in season	Title	Directed by	Written by	Original release date	Prod. code	U.S. viewers (millions)
65	1	"God of War"	David Boreanaz	Spencer Hudnut & Kenny Sheard	December 2, 2020	ST401	4.24
66	2	"Forever War"	Christopher Chulack	Spencer Hudnut & Dana Greenblatt	December 2, 2020	ST402	4.24
67	3	"The New Normal"	Christopher Chulack	Spencer Hudnut	December 9, 2020	ST403	4.47
68	4	"Shockwave"	Ruben Garcia	Tom Mularz	December 16, 2020	ST404	4.48
69	5	"The Carrot or The Stick"	Ruben Garcia	Dana Greenblatt	January 13, 2021	ST405	4.03
70	6	"Horror Has a Face"	J. Michael Muro	Matt Bosack & Mark H. Semos	January 27, 2021	ST406	4.20
71	7	"All In"	Félix Alcalá	Corinne Marrinan & Stephen Gasper	February 17, 2021	ST407	3.78
72	8	"Cover for Action"	Ruben Garcia	Dana Greenblatt & Rashaan Dozier-Escalante	March 3, 2021	ST408	4.16
73	9	"Reckoning"	Ruben Garcia	Tom Mularz & Kenny Sheard	March 10, 2021	ST409	3.46
74	10	"A Question of Honor"	Jessica Paré	Ariel Endacott	March 24, 2021	ST410	4.00
75	11	"Limits of Loyalty"	Allison Liddi-Brown	Corinne Marrinan	April 7, 2021	ST411	3.57
76	12	"Rearview Mirror"	Max Thieriot	Kenny Ryan & Jacob Roman	April 21, 2021	ST412	3.52
77	13	"Do No Harm"	Tyler Grey	Tom Mularz & Kinan Copen	May 5, 2021	ST413	3.74
78	14	"Hollow at the Core"	J. Michael Muro	Matt Bosack & Kenny Sheard	May 12, 2021	ST414	3.54
79	15	"Nightmare of My Choice"	David Boreanaz	Spencer Hudnut & Mark H. Semos	May 19, 2021	ST415	3.60
80	16	"One Life to Live"	Christopher Chulack	Spencer Hudnut & Dana Greenblatt	May 26, 2021	ST416	3.84

=== Season 5 (2021–22) ===
No. overall	No. in season	Title	Directed by	Written by	Original air/release date	Prod. code	U.S. viewers (millions)
CBS
81	1	"Trust, But Verify: Part 1"	Christopher Chulack	Spencer Hudnut	October 10, 2021	ST501	3.73
82	2	"Trust, But Verify: Part 2"	Christopher Chulack	Tom Mularz & Mark H. Semos	October 17, 2021	ST502	3.37
83	3	"Nine Ten"	Jessica Paré	Dana Greenblatt	October 24, 2021	ST503	3.58
84	4	"Need to Know"	Tyler Grey	Tom Mularz & Mark H. Semos	October 31, 2021	ST504	3.19
Paramount+
85	5	"Frog on the Tracks"	J. Michael Muro	Spencer Hudnut & Kenny Sheard	November 1, 2021	ST505	N/A
86	6	"Man on Fire"	J. Michael Muro	Kinan Copen	November 7, 2021	ST506	N/A
87	7	"What's Past Is Prologue"	Allison Liddi-Brown	Dana Greenblatt & Rashaan Dozier-Escalante	November 14, 2021	ST507	N/A
88	8	"Conspicuous Gallantry"	David Boreanaz	Teresa Huang & Stephen Gasper	November 21, 2021	ST508	N/A
89	9	"Close to Home"	Gonzalo Amat	Tom Mularz & Ariel Endacott	November 28, 2021	ST509	N/A
90	10	"Head On"	Ruben Garcia	Kinan Copen & Rashaan Dozier-Escalante	December 5, 2021	ST510	N/A
91	11	"Violence of Action"	Ruben Garcia	Tom Mularz & Teresa Huang	January 2, 2022	ST511	N/A
92	12	"Keys to Heaven"	Loren Yaconelli	Dana Greenblatt & Kenny Sheard	January 9, 2022	ST512	N/A
93	13	"Pillar of Strength"	David Boreanaz	Mark H. Semos & Stephen Gasper	January 16, 2022	ST513	N/A
94	14	"All Bravo Stations"	Christopher Chulack	Spencer Hudnut	January 23, 2022	ST514	N/A

=== Season 6 (2022) ===
No. overall	No. in season	Title	Directed by	Written by	Original release date	Prod. code
95	1	"Low-Impact"	Christopher Chulack	Spencer Hudnut & Mark H. Semos	September 18, 2022	ST601
96	2	"Crawl, Walk, Run"	Jessica Paré	Dana Greenblatt & Leanne Koch	September 25, 2022	ST602
97	3	"Growing Pains"	Cherie Nowlan	Tom Mularz & Madalyn Lawson	October 2, 2022	ST603
98	4	"Phantom Pattern"	David Boreanaz	Kenny Sheard & Ariel Endacott	October 9, 2022	ST604
99	5	"Thunderstruck"	Ruben Garcia	Tom Mularz & Brian Beneker	October 16, 2022	ST605
100	6	"Watch Your 6"	Gonzalo Amat	Dana Greenblatt & Stephen Gasper	October 23, 2022	ST606
101	7	"Strange Bedfellows"	Ruben Garcia	Kinan Copen	October 30, 2022	ST607
102	8	"Aces and Eights"	Jason Cabell	Tom Mularz & Kenny Sheard	November 6, 2022	ST608
103	9	"Damage Assessment"	Christopher Chulack	Spencer Hudnut & Mark H. Semos	November 13, 2022	ST609
104	10	"Fair Winds and Following Seas"	Christopher Chulack	Spencer Hudnut & Dana Greenblatt	November 20, 2022	ST610

=== Season 7 (2024) ===
No. overall	No. in season	Title	Directed by	Written by	Original release date	Prod. code
105	1	"Chaos in the Calm, Part 1"	Christopher Chulack	Spencer Hudnut & Dana Greenblatt	August 11, 2024	ST701
106	2	"Chaos in the Calm, Part 2"	Christopher Chulack	Mark H. Semos & Kinan Copen	August 11, 2024	ST702
107	3	"Ships in the Night"	S. J. Main Muñoz	Tom Mularz & Stephen Gasper	August 18, 2024	ST703
108	4	"Heroes and Criminals"	Mark H. Semos	Ariel Endacott & Madalyn Lawson	August 25, 2024	ST704
109	5	"A Perfect Storm"	Jessica Paré	Dana Greenblatt & Leanne Koch	September 1, 2024	ST705
110	6	"Hundred-Year Marathon"	David Boreanaz	Tyler Grey & Maggie Stabile	September 8, 2024	ST706
111	7	"Mission Creep"	Lionel Coleman	Tom Mularz	September 15, 2024	ST707
112	8	"Appetite for Destruction"	Ruben Garcia	Dana Greenblatt & Brian Beneker	September 22, 2024	ST708
113	9	"The Seas and the Hills"	Ruben Garcia	Peter Rudolph & Mac Bundick, Jr.	September 29, 2024	ST709
114	10	"The Last Word"	Christopher Chulack	Spencer Hudnut	October 6, 2024	ST710

== Ratings ==
=== Summary ===
SEAL Team : U.S. viewers per episode (millions)

Season	Episode number																					
Season	1	2	3	4	5	6	7	8	9	10	11	12	13	14	15	16	17	18	19	20	21	22
1	9.88	8.39	8.02	7.11	6.92	6.22	7.24	6.94	6.90	5.86	6.17	6.67	6.65	4.97	6.07	6.36	6.48	6.24	6.26	5.89	6.15	6.14
2	5.02	5.46	5.40	5.38	5.33	5.61	5.17	5.93	5.31	6.59	6.23	5.57	5.08	4.89	3.91	3.73	4.44	4.59	3.90	4.68	4.13	4.08
3	5.25	4.77	4.47	4.50	4.40	4.52	4.69	5.77	5.44	5.85	4.33	3.97	4.59	4.91	4.92	5.10	4.89	5.82	5.75	4.54	–	
4	4.24	4.24	4.47	4.48	4.03	4.20	3.78	4.16	3.46	4.00	3.57	3.52	3.74	3.54	3.60	3.84	–					
5	3.73	3.37	3.58	3.19	–																	

Audience measurement performed by Nielsen Media Research

== Home media ==
SEAL Team: Season One
Set details	Special features	
6 disc; 22 episodes; Box set, Color, NTSC, Subtitled, Widescreen; 15 hours and 39 minutes		
DVD release dates
Region 1	Region 2	Region 4
August 14, 2018	October 15, 2018	November 21, 2018

SEAL Team: Season Two
Set details	Special features	
5 disc; 22 episodes; NTSC; 15 hours and 41 minutes		
DVD release dates
Region 1	Region 2	Region 4
September 10, 2019	November 18, 2019	

SEAL Team: Season Three
Set details	Special features	
5 disc; 20 episodes; NTSC, Widescreen; 14 hours and 18 minutes	Welcome to Serbia; Shifting Gears; Lights, Camera, Execute; Worlds Apart	
DVD release dates
Region 1	Region 2	Region 4
August 25, 2020		

SEAL Team: Season Four
Set details	Special features	
4 disc; 16 episodes; Subtitled, NTSC		
DVD release dates
Region 1	Region 2	Region 4
September 7, 2021		
