= SEAL Team (TV series) =

American military drama television series

- Genre: Action fiction; Military drama
- Created by: Benjamin Cavell
- Starring: David Boreanaz; Max Thieriot; Jessica Paré; Neil Brown Jr.; A. J. Buckley; Toni Trucks; Judd Lormand; Raffi Barsoumian; Beau Knapp
- Composers: W. G. Snuffy Walden; A. Patrick Rose
- Country of origin: United States
- Original language: English
- No. of seasons: 7
- No. of episodes: 114 (list of episodes)

Production
- Executive producers: Benjamin Cavell; Ed Redlich; Sarah Timberman; Carl Beverly; Christopher Chulack; Spencer Hudnut; John Glenn; David Boreanaz; Mark Owen
- Producers: Dana Greenblatt; Tom Mularz; Mark Semos; Todd Lewis; Kate DiMento; Chris Leanza
- Cinematography: Gonzalo Amat; J. Michael Muro
- Editor: Adam Wolfe
- Camera setup: Single-camera
- Running time: 43−49 minutes
- Production companies: Chulack Productions; East 25 C (season 1); Timberman/Beverly Productions; John Glenn Entertainment (seasons 2–3); CBS Studios (Note: Credited as CBS Television Studios (seasons 1–3))

Original release
- Network: CBS
- Release: September 27, 2017 – October 31, 2021
- Network: Paramount+
- Release: November 1, 2021 – October 6, 2024

SEAL Team is an American military drama television series created by Benjamin Cavell and produced by CBS Studios. The series stars David Boreanaz, Max Thieriot, Jessica Paré, Neil Brown Jr., A. J. Buckley, and Toni Trucks and follows an elite unit of United States Navy SEALs. It aired on CBS from September 27, 2017 to October 31, 2021; it then moved to Paramount+ for the remainder of its run, with the series finale airing on October 6, 2024.

== Overview ==
The series follows Bravo Team, a sub-unit of the United States Naval Special Warfare Development Group, the most elite unit of Navy SEALs, as they plan and undertake dangerous missions worldwide with little notice, and the burden placed on them and their families.

== Episodes ==
Season	Episodes		Originally released		
Season	Episodes		First released	Last released	Network
1	22		September 27, 2017	May 16, 2018	CBS
2	22		October 3, 2018	May 22, 2019	CBS
3	20		October 2, 2019	May 6, 2020	CBS
4	16		December 2, 2020	May 26, 2021	CBS
5	14	4	October 10, 2021	October 31, 2021	CBS
5	14	10	November 1, 2021	January 23, 2022	Paramount+
6	10		September 18, 2022	November 20, 2022	Paramount+
7	10		August 11, 2024	October 6, 2024	Paramount+

== Cast and characters ==
- David Boreanaz as Master Chief Special Warfare Operator (Note: Enlisted SEALs have Special Warfare Operator specific ratings. See US Navy SEAL ratings.) Jason Hayes a.k.a. Bravo 1/1B, the leader of a Navy SEAL team (Bravo Team) dealing with the recent loss of one of their own.
- Max Thieriot as Special Warfare Operator First Class Clay Spenser a.k.a. Bravo 6/6B (seasons 1–6), a second-generation Navy SEAL in training for Tier One status who is questioned as to his readiness for combat. He becomes a member of Bravo Team at the end of "The Exchange", and twice briefly served as the team's second-in-command.
- Neil Brown Jr. as Chief Warrant Officer 2 Raymond "Ray" Perry, formerly Senior Chief Special Warfare Operator, a.k.a. Mako 1/MK-1, former Bravo 2/2B, Jason's most trusted friend and the longest tenured member of the team. Ray is promoted to Chief Warrant Officer 2 in season 4. Since season 6, Ray acts as Bravo Team's Officer-in-charge and in the series finale Ray took a position of Head of Warfighter Health.
- Jessica Paré as Amanda "Mandy" Ellis (seasons 1–4; recurring seasons 5–7), Bravo Team's CIA liaison. Due to her actions of giving up the location of a CIA asset in "My Life for Yours", Mandy is demoted from her rank of officer and is now serving as an interrogator for the CIA.
- A. J. Buckley as Chief Special Warfare Operator Percival "Sonny" Quinn a.k.a. Bravo 3/3B, a loyal but sometimes volatile SEAL who is at his best in firefights and prefers them over a leadership position. Sonny is promoted to Chief Petty Officer in season 7 and then decides to retire from the Navy in the series finale.
- Toni Trucks as Lieutenant Lisa Davis, formerly Logistics Specialist First Class, then Ensign, and, since season 3, a DEVGRU Intelligence Officer assigned primarily to Bravo Team.
- Judd Lormand as Commander, formerly Lieutenant Commander, Eric Blackburn (seasons 2–4; recurring seasons 1, 5–7), Bravo Team's former commanding officer, promoted to Executive Officer of DEVGRU during season 4.
- Raffi Barsoumian as Senior Chief Special Warfare Operator Omar Hamza a.k.a. Bravo 2/2B, former Foxtrot 2/2F (seasons 6–7), a SEAL for fifteen years and the son of Syrian immigrants. Omar was Foxtrot's second-in-command, prior to the team being decommissioned. He was transferred to Bravo Team to fill the spot left by Clay and becomes the second-in-command for the team, when Ray becomes acting officer-in-charge.
- Beau Knapp as Special Warfare Operator First Class Laurance A. "Drew" Franklin IV a.k.a. Bravo 6/6B (season 7), the newest member of Bravo Team who joins their mission in Sweden and then becomes assigned full time.
- Dylan Walsh as Captain Walch (recurring season 7), the recently appointed commanding officer of DEVGRU, who is by-the-book, but also has aspirations for politics.

== Production ==
=== Development ===
CBS announced on January 27, 2017 that they had given the pilot order for another Navy SEAL project, following the success of History Channel's Six. The episode was written by Benjamin Cavell, who was expected to be an executive producer, with Ed Redlich, Sarah Timberman, Carl Beverly, and Christopher Chulack. Production companies involved with the pilot included Chulack Productions, East 25 C, Timberman/Beverly Productions, and CBS Television Studios. On May 12, 2017, CBS officially ordered the pilot to series.

The series received a full-season order on October 12, 2017, bringing the first season to a total of 22 episodes. On March 27, 2018, CBS renewed the series for a second season. On May 22, 2018, CBS reported that both Cavell and Redlich were leaving their roles as executive producer and showrunner, and John Glenn would be showrunner. On May 9, 2019, CBS renewed the series for a third season. Spencer Hudnut replaced John Glenn as showrunner in 2019 after an internal probe by CBS resulted in his dismissal and canceling of his overall deal. On May 6, 2020, CBS renewed the series for a fourth season. On May 14, 2021, CBS reported that the series was considering a move to the streaming service Paramount+ if renewed for a fifth season; if a deal were reached, the series would air some of its fifth-season episodes on CBS before moving to Paramount+. Four days later, the deal was finalized.

On February 1, 2022, Paramount+ renewed the series for a sixth season. On January 18, 2023, Paramount+ renewed the series for a seventh season. On November 15, 2023, it was announced that the seventh season would be the final season, and plans were cancelled for a stand-alone movie on Paramount+.

=== Casting ===
On March 14, 2017, it was announced that Jim Caviezel would topline CBS' then-untitled Navy SEAL drama pilot but on March 22, 2017, it was announced that David Boreanaz had been cast in the pilot's lead role of Jason, replacing Caviezel. On March 8, 2017, it was reported that A. J. Buckley would play Sonny. On August 15, 2018, it was reported that Judd Lormand had been upgraded to series regular for season 2. On August 8, 2018, it was announced that Michael McGrady and Ruffin Prentiss would recur as Captain Harrington and Summer Kairos in the series' second season. On July 10, 2019, it was reported that Jamie McShane and Rudy Dobrev were cast in recurring roles for the third season. On August 7, 2019, Emily Swallow was cast in a recurring capacity for the third season. On January 27, 2021, Shiva Negar joined the cast in a recurring role for the fourth season. On December 12, 2023, Beau Knapp was cast as a series regular for the seventh and final season.

=== Authenticity ===
The show looks to former operators for their real-life experience to make it as authentic as possible. The series has former Navy SEALs Mark Semos and Kenny Sheard in the writers’ room, more than 70-percent of its crew are veterans, and almost the entire stunt team are former special operators. Tyler Grey who plays Trent is a former Delta Force operator.

== Broadcast and release ==
The series premiered in the United States on CBS on September 27, 2017. The second season premiered on October 3, 2018. The third season premiered on October 2, 2019. The fourth season premiered on December 2, 2020. The fifth season premiered on October 10, 2021. The sixth season premiered on September 18, 2022 on Paramount+. The seventh and final premiered on August 11, 2024.

=== Home media ===
Season	No. of episodes	DVD Release dates		
Season	No. of episodes	Region 1	Region 2	Region 4
1	22	August 14, 2018	October 15, 2018	November 21, 2018
2	22	September 10, 2019	November 18, 2019	
3	20	August 25, 2020		
4	16	September 7, 2021		
5	14	September 13, 2022		
6	10	May 23, 2023		

== Reception ==
=== Critical response ===
The review aggregator website Rotten Tomatoes reported an approval rating of 71% based on 24 reviews, with an average rating of 5.9/10. The site's critical consensus reads, "SEAL Team's solidly written first season offers compelling characters and hints at broader potential, even if it's somewhat undermined by an overall sense of predictability." Metacritic, which uses a weighted average, assigned a score of 57 out of 100 based on 16 critics, indicating "mixed or average reviews".

=== Ratings ===
Viewership and ratings per season of SEAL Team
Season	Timeslot (ET)	Episodes	First aired		Last aired		TV season	Viewership rank	Avg. viewers (millions)
Season	Timeslot (ET)	Episodes	Date	Viewers (millions)	Date	Viewers (millions)	TV season	Viewership rank	Avg. viewers (millions)
1	Wednesday 9:00 pm	22	September 27, 2017	9.88	May 16, 2018	6.14	2017–18	28	9.87
2	Wednesday 9:00 pm (1–13); Wednesday 10:00 pm (14–22)	22	October 3, 2018	5.02	May 22, 2019	4.24	2018–19	39	8.29
3	Wednesday 9:00 pm	20	October 2, 2019	5.25	May 6, 2020	4.54	2019–20	33	8.02
4	Wednesday 9:00 pm	16	December 2, 2020	4.24	May 26, 2021	3.84	2020–21	38	6.44
5	Sunday 10:00 pm Sunday 10:30 p.m. (2–3)	4	October 10, 2021	3.73	October 31, 2021	3.19	2021–22	42	5.83

- Note: The fourteenth episode of the first season and third-season finale aired out of their regular timeslots, at Wednesday 10 pm.

=== Accolades ===
Year	Award	Category	Nominee	Result	Ref.
2018	Primetime Emmy Awards	Outstanding Music Composition for a Series (Original Dramatic Score)	W.G. Snuffy Walden, A. Patrick Rose	Nominated	
2019	Primetime Emmy Awards	Outstanding Stunt Coordination for a Drama Series, Limited Series, or Movie	Peewee Piemonte, Julie Michaels	Nominated	

== See also ==
- The Brave—Similar type of series but focused on a fictional Defense Intelligence Agency unit
- Six—Similar fictional hourly drama based on the Tier One SEAL team
- Strike Back—A British/American action-adventure/spy-drama television series follows actions of Section 20, a secretive branch of the British Defence Intelligence service
- Ultimate Force—Similar type of series but focused on the British Army's Special Air Service
- The Unit—Similar type of series but focused on the United States Army's Delta Force
