= Oydin Norboyeva =

Uzbek actress

Oydin Norboyeva Svetlana Norbaeva
- Born: 5 March 1944 (age 81); Tashkent, Uzbek SSR
- Other names: Svetlana Norbaeva
- Occupation: actress
- Children: Dzhanik Fayziev

Oydin Abdulhaqovna Norboyeva (Uzbek: Ойдин Абдулҳақовна Норбоева; born 5 March 1944 in Tashkent), also known as Svetlana Norbaeva, is an Uzbek actress of theater and cinema, People's Artist of the Uzbek SSR (1979), Laureate of the State Prize of Uzbekistan (1989). She is best known for starring in “Rustam and Suhrab (1973), “Vesennyaya melodiya” (“The Spring Melody”) (1978), “The Gordin Cell” (2012). She was awarded the Lenin Komsomol Prize of Uzbekistan (1967) for playing the role of Nadia in the film "Don't Shoot at the 26th". She was also awarded the State Hamza Prize.

== Life ==
Oydin (Svetlana) Norboeva was born on 5 March 1944 in Tashkent, Uzbek SSR. Her father was a theater actor Hamza Abdulkhak Narbaev. In 1964, Norboeva graduated from the acting department of the Tashkent Theater and Art Institute named after A. Ostrovsky. While a student, she was accepted into the troupe of the Uzbek State Academic Drama Theater named after I. Hamza (1963), where she worked until 1990.

== Career ==
In 1964, Norboeva began acting in films with her first role of Suraya in Uchkun Nazarov's film “Suraya”. The next year, in 1965, she received a diploma “For a successful debut” of the film festival of the republics of Central Asia and Kazakhstan for this role. In 1966, Norboeva starred as Nadia in the firm “Don’t shoot at the 26th”. In 1967, she was awarded the Lenin Komsomol Prize of Uzbekistan for this role.

In 1973, Norboeva played a role of Tahmina in the film “Rustam and Suhrab”. The film was shot at “Tajikfilm”. In 1978, Norboyeva starred in the film “Vesennyaya melodiya” (“The Spring Melody”).

In 1979, she was awarded a title of People's Artist of the Uzbek SSR.

Since 1986, Norboeva combined her main work with work at the Ilkhom Theater of Mark Weil, and since 1990, she collaborated with the Academic Russian Drama Theater of Uzbekistan.

In total Norboeva has played over 50 roles in theater and cinema. Norboyeva starred in the films: "Obsessed" (Zamira), "Insight", “Don't shoot at the 26th” (Nadia), “You are my song” (Kamila), "The Legend of Rustam" and "Rustam and Suhrab" (Takhmina), "As the heart commands" (Khairi) and others.

== Personal life ==
Oydin Norboeva was married to the director Khabibulla Fayziev (born 1938) and the actor Bimbolat Vataev (1939–2000). Her son Dzhanik Fayziev is an actor, director and producer. Since 1999, Norboeva lives in Tel Aviv, Israel.

== Filmography (selected) ==
- 1964 - Life passed at night - Suraya
- 1965 - Obsessed - Zamira
- 1966 - Don't shoot on the 26th - Nadia
- 1968 - As the heart says - Hyri
- 1969 - Her name is Vesna - Turakhanov's wife
- 1971 - The Legend of Rustam - Takhmina
- 1971 - Rustam and Suhrab - Takhmina
- 1972 - At the very blue sky - Iskander's mother
- 1972 - Towards you - Malakhat
- 1975 - You, my song
- 1976 - My older brother - Razika
- 1977 - It was in Kokand - Fatima
- 1978 - Clear Keys
- 1979 - Gray breathing dragon / Des Drachens grauer Atem (GDR) - Bath Blake
- 1981 - Provincial romance
- 1983 - Family Secrets - Firuza
- 1991 - Cammy - Camilla's mother
- 2012 - The Gordin Cell - Grandmother Nina (Nina Isaakovna)

== See also ==
Rano Yarasheva
