= Spy (2015 TV series) =

- Promotional poster
- Genre: Thriller; Action; Romance; Family
- Based on: The Gordin Cell by Ron Leshem, Daniel Syrkin, Amit Cohen and Giora Yahalom
- Developed by: KBS Drama Production
- Written by: Han Sang-woon; Lee Kang
- Directed by: Park Hyun-suk
- Starring: Kim Jae-joong; Bae Jong-ok; Yu Oh-seong; Ko Sung-hee
- Country of origin: South Korea
- Original language: Korean
- No. of episodes: 16

Production
- Running time: 100 minutes
- Production companies: imTV Co., Ltd. DN Contents; 7even Studio

Original release
- Network: KBS2
- Release: January 9 – March 6, 2015

Related
- The Gordin Cell; Allegiance

Spy (Korean: 스파이) is a 2015 South Korean television series based on the Israeli drama The Gordin Cell but modified to depict North/South Korean relations. A family drama with spy thriller elements, it starred Kim Jae-joong as a genius analyst working for the National Intelligence Service (NIS), while Bae Jong-ok played his mother, an ex-spy from North Korea.

SPY aired two episodes a week back to back on Fridays on KBS2 from January 9 to March 6, 2015 for a total of 16 episodes.

== Plot ==
The fictional story begins after the execution of real-life North Korean general Jang Sung-taek. One day an order comes down from North Korea, reactivating erstwhile spy Park Hye-rim who has spent decades in South Korea as an ordinary housewife. She is given the mission to turn and bring in her own son, Kim Sun-woo. Cool-headed, quick-witted genius Sun-woo is an information analyst on North Korea working for the NIS. His girlfriend Yoon-jin is a tour guide for Chinese tourists who cannot speak Chinese, and they fell in love when Sun-woo helped her translate. Hye-rim is suddenly forced to choose between her son and country, and risks her life to see the choice through.

== Cast and characters ==
=== Main characters ===
Actor	Character	Description
Kim Jae-joong	Kim Sun-woo	NIS North Korean information analyst In front of his parents, he hides as a normal public official, but in fact, he is a genius analyst who has outstanding abilities in information analysis. He always takes care of his family, his girlfriend and his colleagues with a warm heart and maturity.
Bae Jong-ok	Park Hye-rim	Sun-woo's mother; A former spy The instinct of a spy is still left in her. Like an obsessive-compulsive disorder patient, she is a little wary of people around her and tries to make everything in her family perfect. However, she cherishes and loves her son and her family more than anyone.
Yu Oh-seong	Hwang Ki-chul	North Korean agent Agent who comes to reorganize the spy line in South Korea but he does not work by himself. He just picks the people who become the pawns in his chessboard. This time the sacrificial lamb of his intelligent play is the peaceful and happy family of Hye-rim and Sun-woo.
Ko Sung-hee	Lee Yoon-jin	Sun-woo's girlfriend Mysterious woman with many secrets. She claims to be an orphan but it is revealed later on that this is not true. However, she is very nice and caring just like Sun-woo. Just when she dreams about a happy family with Sun-woo, she could not have expected that she would face the opposition of his mother, Hye-rim.

=== Kim's family ===
Actor	Character	Description
Jung Won-joong	Kim Woo-suk	Sun-woo's father, Hye-rim's husband He is an executive of an IT security company. In love with Hye-rim, even knowing that she was a North Korean spy, they got married. He compromises with North Korean Intelligence Agency to monitor his son Sun-woo in order to collect intelligence information.
Lee Ha-eun	Kim Young-seo	Sun-woo's sister, Hye-rim's daughter She is a high-school student who is suffering from her demanding mother and tons of classwork. Despite the high pressure from her mother and her school she is very much a bright and cheery girl.

=== Members of NIS ===
Actor	Character	Description
Jo Dal-hwan	Kim Hyun-tae	Sun-woo's colleague A man who likes cracking jokes and flirting with girls. Unlike his appearance, he is an expert in obtaining intelligence information. He has once been the ACE of NIS, made a mistake and lost his teammate. He is now a sinecure in the organization.
Kim Min-jae	Song Joong-hyuk	Sun-woo's boss Chief of the analyzing team. He and Hyun-tae joined NIS in the same period of time, good at playing political games. He pays special regard to Sun-woo's strengths and abilities, tries to train Sun-woo to become his right-hand man.
Ryu Hye-young	Noh Eun-ah	Sun-woo's colleague A subtle competition exists between Eun-ah and Sun-woo because of her exceptional abilities. However, as she starts working in the same team as Sun-woo, her feelings for him begin to change.
Lee Dae-yeon	Jung Kyu-yong	NIS Vice-chief; Flattering the superiors is his stock in trade to get promoted.
Jo Chang-geun	Jong-han	
Choi Yoo-ra	Hong-ran	

=== Ki-chul's men ===
Actor	Character	Description
Woo-hyuk	Jung-ho	Ki-chul's assistant
Chae Soo-bin	Jo Soo-yeon	North Korean agent who works with the NIS

== Episodes ==
Summaries

No.	Summary
1	In a dark alley of Shenyang, China, Kim Sun-woo speaks with his mother on the phone, reassuring her that he is traveling up from Busan. He climbs into a car, a briefcase in hand, but barely drives off a few yards before a truck slams into the car. The driver who sits next to Sun-woo (who is later revealed to be his work-partner) is stabbed to death. The man who orders the attack spares Sun-woo from the same fate due to a family photo found inside his wallet. His briefcase is stolen along with some personal belongings to mask the attack as a robbery. Sun-woo is sent back to Seoul injured. Later, he is questioned at the National Intelligence Service (NIS) headquarters in regards to his failed operation. No one understands why Sun-woo's life was spared. Chief Song takes the opportunity to reassign Sun-woo to his team as an analyst. Sun-woo wants to bring his girlfriend, Lee Yoon-jin, home to introduce to his family. However, Sun-woo is late because of traffic, Yoon-jin has to face a challenge by meeting Sun-woo's anxious, over-protective mother. Her attempts to endear herself to Sun-woo's mother by revealing that they are from the same hometown in China are met with suspicion. Sun-woo and Agent Hyun-tae are appointed to meet a North Korean female secret agent. Hyun-tae is displeased that Sun-woo has not brought a gun with him so he intends to pull out and arrange another rendezvous location, but Sun-woo decides to head in himself because they may not have another opportunity like this. They eventually bring the girl to their headquarters. The girl, Soo-yeon, is interviewed by Sun-woo's female co-worker Noh Eun-ah to put Soo-yeon at ease. Eun-ah's aggressive interrogation style, however, upsets Soo-yeon and she refuses to say anything else until Sun-woo volunteers to speak with her. Sun-woo eventually finds the location where she was held after asking Soo-yeon a few questions. Soo-yeon begs Sun-woo to rescue her family from North Korea. Back at home, someone rings the bell, Sun-woo's mother goes to answer the door and opens it. Mom is scared to death when an unexpected male guest appears.
2	The visitor, Hwang Ki-chul, is a North Korean spy and Mom's workmate from when she was an active agent in China. He is now an apparent ghost from her past. Ki-chul comes on business and asks Mom to take an order or risk giving up her perfect family. While interrogating Soo-yeon, Sun-woo becomes aware that the "scarred man" who kidnapped her and executed her comrades is the same man who spared him in China but killed his partner. Soo-yeon argues that she doesn't know much but she is willing to cooperate and in exchange begs for the NIS agents to save her family by helping them escape from North Korea. Sun-woo tells her that they can't guarantee the safety of her family in the North. They can only take care of her while she is with them. Soo-yeon claims that there is a supervisor who can be paid for his services and that he will bring her family to the South. Hyun-tae suddenly bursts into the interrogation room to demand Soo-yeon a number of questions about her supervisor. Sun-woo is upset when he learns that Chief Song reassigned him to a desk job. Sun-woo insists that he is made for the field and has recovered from his injury, but Chief Song is not persuaded. A nightmare returns Sun-woo to the scene of the crash and he wakes up in Yoon-jin's home. It seems that the nightmares are nothing new to her. She is worried about him, but he hides what he was dreaming about and wipes her worries with ease. While mom sits in on Young-seo's class, Ki-chul calls the cellphone he secretly left in her handbag. He instructs her to take a bag out of one of the nearby lockers, threatening to expose her identity to the whole nation if she disobeys. Mom takes the bag to the location provided by Ki-chul after disguising herself in bargain store clothes. Ki-chul calls her to leave the bag at a subway terminal, saying that someone will collect it after she leaves. While Mom is turning her back to leave, the bag behind her explodes. Mom hurries back home and Ki-chul's call follows. He admits the subway explosion was a setup to get Mom under his control for the real task ahead. Mom is shocked to learn from Ki-chul that her son is not a simple government employee but an exceptional field agent of the NIS. Ki-chul comments that while Sun-woo is not as good as she was in her prime he is fast, strong and adept at deceiving people. "Hand Kim Sun-woo over to me, then you will be free." Ki-chul instructs.
3	Mom refuses to believe that Sun-woo is actually a spy, but when she calls his work number, the person on the other line verifies that Sun-woo has been transferred to another department three years ago and that the business trip to Busan Sun-woo had told her he attended was cancelled. Sun-woo discovered that the interrogation process has ceased, and Soo-yeon, the North Korean agent will speak out in a press conference tomorrow morning. Sun-woo visits Hyun-tae. Hyun-tae reminds Sun-woo that it would be better for him to give up any idea on Soo-yeon's case, but Sun-woo says that he would never forget the scarred man who killed his fellow agent in China. Mom heads to the bank to withdraw all of her money from her accounts but discovered that it was taken out two days ago. Later, she also discovers that none of her credit cards work either. Ki-chul appears and warns Mom to not try to run away alone and leave her family behind. Ki-chul offers to meet either Mom or Sun-woo that night. Dad receives a goodbye text from Mom so he runs out from his workplace to chase her. Mom tells her husband that Hwang Ki-chul is here he wants Sun-woo to work for him. Their son, Sun-woo, is not a simple government employee but works as an NIS agent. Dad insists that they should tackle the difficulty ahead together. Sun-woo finds Eun-ah sitting alone in a bar looking depressed after her blind date did not go well. Sun-woo drinks with her and gets to know more about his team from her. When the designated time draws near, Dad insists to go with his wife to meet Ki-chul. As they meet Ki-chul, Mom were forced to call Sun-woo over but she refuses to do so. The couple want to become spies in Sun-woo's place.
4	Ki-chul agrees to let the parents do the spying in her son's stead, he demands Mom to hack Sun-woo's cellphone and computer, and reports Sun-woo's activities to him. Sun-woo commits to Chief Song that he has an idea to capture the North Korean spy in-charge. Song calls a meeting, Sun-woo's plan is to turn Soo-yeon into a double agent and send her back out into the field. However, Song plans to let Soo-yeon meeting the in-charge directly and then capture him. Song leaves all the planning to Sun-woo. Sun-woo conveys the double agent idea to Soo-yeon, who agrees as long as she can get enough money to resettle herself and her family abroad when it's all over. Even though Hyun-tae is in his ear telling him not to promise anything, Sun-woo assures to Soo-yeon that he will do his best. Soo-yeon makes a phone call to Ki-chul, claiming that she has found the money he requested and has information about the supervisor he may want to know. Ki-chul promises to fix a time and place to meet. Sun-woo comes home for a shower, telling his parents that he will be returning straight to work. Mom takes the opportunity to hack Sun-woo's cellphone and computer. Immediately after Sun-woo leaves, Mom and Dad follow in a rented car, using the tracker she put in his bag. Mom is huffy when they follow Sun-woo not to work, but to Yoon-jin's house. What is even more surprising is that Yoon-jin seems to know all about Sun-woo's job when the family has been kept in the dark. Sun-woo leaves Yoon-jin's house after receiving a call regarding the task tomorrow. Mom is concerned about what Sun-woo would do her son will be in danger if it involves Ki-chul, she says to her husband with conviction that she will erase the bit where he talks about tomorrow before handing the recording to Ki-chul. Chief Song insists that no extra precautions for Soo-yeon's meeting, despite Sun-woo's insistence that making a mistake could put the girl in severe danger. Sun-woo's team accompanies Soo-yeon to a cafe they have taken over, preparing the fake money she has to give to the man she is going to meet. Sun-woo has arranged Soo-yeon to talk with her mother before leaving the cafe. Soo-yeon is overwhelmed with emotion to hear her mother's voice. Soo-yeon walks out to the public street where she has been told to wait, while Sun-woo monitors all the cameras set up as well as the field agents they have placed near her. He stresses to all of them that Soo-yeon's safety is their first priority, the mission second. They listen to Soo-yeon's phone when Ki-chul calls her. Ki-chul frightens Soo-yeon when he mentions the whereabouts of her remaining family. Suddenly a conspicuous motorcyclist causes a car crash right in front of Soo-yeon, and Ki-chul appears before her. Sun-woo runs through the crowd and toward Soo-yeon, stopping dead when he reaches her and sees the pained expression on her face. He is able to catch her when her knees buckle beneath her.
5	Sun-woo is in a shock recalling Soo-yeon's final moments. Eun-ah offers him a towel to wipe off the blood, Chief Song comes storming in, ignores Sun-woo's feeling but demands to know where the suspect is. Sun-woo leaves the cafe without saying a word. Mom goes to Ki-chul's place, tries to explain why she did not report Sun-woo's plan. However, she is answered by a hard slap to the face. Ki-chul explains that it is not Sun-woo whom he needs, but an instrument to infiltrate the NIS. Mom begs for Ki-chul's mercy or she will kill herself to set Sun-woo's free. Ki-chul hands her a photo of Chief Song. Sun-woo wanders the streets alone. Yoon-jin calls, he does his best to sound unaffected when lying that everything went well and that they caught the bad guy. Yoon-jin is relieved to hear it, and Sun-woo insists that he's fine. He heads over to her house to clean the blood from his hand and clothes in an almost furious manner. When Mom meets Dad at an overpass, she hands over Chief Song's photo. Mom believes that this is Ki-chul's true target and wanted to use Sun-woo to get access to his boss. Dad wonders how they will be able to plant a bug on an NIS employee's phone, but Mom says they must. Mom also starts searching the rented car for a planted bug, convinced that is how Ki-chul knew that they were trying to trick him, but nothing turns up. Dad offers that perhaps Ki-chul had an informant of his own, it triggers her that there is one possible place that could have been bugged. Sun-woo meets a contact who has ways to smuggling people out the North. Sun-woo wants to save Soo-yeon's family so he writes down an amount, telling him it is his entire life's savings. Sun-woo loses his patience when the contact has mentioned his fellow agent's death. His contact finally agrees to take the task reluctantly. Chief Song is frustrated when a code-breaker is unable to crack a code that automatically shuts him out after five attempts. The code-breaker suggests that Song should seek assistance somewhere else. Next morning, Sun-woo is questioned from an agent in the Inspection Division. Sun-woo acknowledges that the chances of success in this mission were low, and when asked why he left on his own afterwards, Sun-woo answers that he had a promise to keep. Chief Song chuckles at that response knowingly, then looks down at the report listing Hedge Technet as the top candidate. He recalls that Sun-woo's father works as an IT executive there. Mom heads out and sneaks into Yoon-jin's apartment while she is away. Using a wiretapping device she asked from her husband one night before, Mom searches the place top to bottom trying to find out a bug. She discovers a cell phone hidden in a drawer with one listed contact, "Mom." Recalling Yoon-jin had told her that both of her parents were deceased, Mom tries calling the number, but then Mom hears footsteps approaching. Yoon-jin is just outside.
6	By the time Yoon-jin enters her apartment, Mom has escaped through the bathroom window. Chief Song asks Sun-woo if he can contact his father about a hard drive he has got. Sun-woo, just wanting someone to ensure Soo-yeon's family's safety, agrees. Hyun-tae and Eun-ah spot through the CCTV around the time of Soo-yeon's murder to find a suspicious figure entering an equally suspicious van. Before he did though, they can see him throwing something away in a dumpster. Hyun-tae heads out immediately to find it with Sun-woo, and they find the murder weapon — a poison pen. Even though Ki-chul is just a human-shaped shadow on the CCTV footage, Sun-woo thinks back the scarred man he met in China after the car accident. Dad tells Mom that Chief Song contacted him, this will provide them an opportunity to bug Song's phone. Sun-woo comes home while Dad wonders where to set the meeting place with Song. Mom puts Sun-woo's things away and decides to go through his bag, coming across pictures of Ki-chul's. When Sun-woo catches her in the act, he is displeased and tells his mother not to do it again. When Mom tries to tell her son she has something to say, Yoon-jin calls in. Mom holds onto the phone to prevent Sun-woo from answering. Sun-woo finds Mom's behavior strange, she tries explaining why she finds Yoon-jin so suspicious and unsettling, especially about her birthplace and her parents. Mom wants him to just withhold the relationship with Yoon-jin for a little while. Sun-woo does not listen to his mother, instead he opens the door for her to leave. Dad tries to comfort his wife, Mom proposes to invite Chief Song over to their house. Mom scopes out Yoon-jin's workplace and discovers Yoon-jin leave her office suddenly. Mom follows her until she goes to a small restaurant. When Moms intends to leave she sees Ki-chul sitting inside. His minions close the shop and draw the curtains, preventing others from seeing more. Yoon-jin reveals herself to be a North Korean spy, she gets close to Seuno on purpose. She meets Ki-chul because she does not want to make reports on Sun-woo's movement anymore. However, her pleas and tears do not move Ki-chul who instructs her to continue the mission as planned. Chief Song tells Sun-woo that Soo-yeon's family has arrived safely. Sun-woo meets the poor mother in the processing area, tells her that the daughter who saved the family and got them into this country is dead. It is time for Yoon-jin to answer a scheduled call from her mother in the North but discovers that the secret phone is missing from her drawer. She hears it ringing from a different part of the room and turns, she finds Sun-woo's Mom is holding the ringing phone in front of her.
7	Yoon-jin recalls how she start working for Ki-chul and the first time she met Sun-woo. Back to the present, Mom holds up the ringing phone and asks Yoon-jin if she is looking for this. Mom asks Yoon-jin's intentions for approaching her son. Yoon-jin replies that her orders were to stick by Sun-woo's side; she does not know what the bigger picture is either because she's simply a pawn that abides by orders. Mom demands that Yoon-jin never appear before her or her family from this moment on. Yoon-jin insists that her feelings towards Sun-woo are sincere, despite knowing that she was not supposed to fall in love with him. Yoon-jin sits in the dark with her tears until she senses that Sun-woo is approaching. She quickly calls him with an excuse that she is busy with work and insists not to meet tonight. Next day Yoon-jin collects some cash and various passports then leaves her apartment. She wants to escape from Ki-chul but is caught by his and taken to a remote area where Ki-chul is already waiting for her. Yoon-jin tells K-chul that she will walk away from Sun-woo, Ki-chul lets her go. Just as Yoon-jin is about to walk away, a familiar ring stops her in her tracks. It is the phone she has thrown away earlier—the same one that is now in Ki-chul's hands. Taking it from Ki-chul's hand, Yoon-jin answers and is utterly relieved to hear her mother's voice on the other end telling her that they arrived safely. But this consequence can only mean that Yoon-jin cannot walk away from Ki-chul's grasp that easily. She asks what it is that Ki-chul wants from her, he grabs her throat and says absolute allegiance. Chief Song tells Sun-woo and the team that they will go to Sun-woo's house for dinner tomorrow. Sun-woo is worried since his family are still in the dark about him working for NIS. Sun-woo stays late at the office, where his facial identification software picks up on a possible match between Ki-chul and an old army photo. Yoon-jin calls and Sun-woo leaves in a hurry without notice the program pick up on another match among the North Korean ranks, his Mom. At home Mom and Dad test out the phone-hacking program, noticing that moving the phone interrupts the process. They'll need a full three minutes in order to pull it off, but they do not even know whether Chief Song will take out his phone or not. Sun-woo find Yoon-jin is upset at dinner. He can see right through her and figures that Mom did go and see his girlfriend after all. He comes right out with it and asks what Mom said, and when Yoon-jin insists that's not the case, he is not fooled in the least. He apologizes on Mom's behalf, takes her hand and promises to protect her, not caring whether his family understands or not anymore. But Yoon-jin pulls her hand out of his and says that is not what a family does. If someone were to ask her to choose between love or her family, she would choose the latter every single time. Sun-woo taking her hand again, he vows to protect her and become the family she does not have. Sun-woo invites Yoon-jin over to join them for dinner. He wants to introduce her to everyone as the woman he's going to marry. Yoon-jin accepted the invitation. Inside Sun-woo's cubicle, the computer identifies two faces from the day Soo-yeon had died to two soldiers in the North Korean troops - Ki-chul and Mom.
8	Sun-woo presents to Chief Song and the team what he has found on Ki-chul. Ki-chul is known as a skilled assassin and that his last appearance was back in China in 1988, and though they had assumed he had been killed due to an explosion. After the meeting, Sun-woo takes a closer look at the picture in his cubicle, unable to shake the resemblance, until Hyun-tae invites him to the basement document storage room. Hyun-tae is surprised when Sun-woo goes straight for a dust-covered file bin covering the years Ki-chul was last known to be in Shenyang. Some photos inside a folder draws Sun-woo's attention. Hyun-tae, who had no plans on attending the dinner, is in a surprise when Chief Song picks him up in a surveillance van. He wants Hyun-tae to go to the dinner with him to help him out with something. Hyun-tae concerns whether Sun-woo is under suspicion and Song replies that he is not. Sun-woo heads home unable to shake off the images from the 1988 explosion, since something in there has caught his attention. Sun-woo goes to his room and pulls out an old photo album to see what Mom's face looked like when he was a child. Chief Song has Hyun-tae outfitted with bugs and earpieces so he can follow the orders he has to receive in Sun-woo's house. They arrive at Sun-woo's house bearing customary gifts as guests, and Hyun-tae stares at Sun-woo's mother with a little suspicious, but quickly covering that he was distracted by her beauty. Eun-ah arrives last and brings ginseng with her, flushing in embarrassment when she looks over at Sun-woo. At the dining table, Hyun-tae asks Mom about her past in China and how she met her husband. She's happy to share their romantic story. When asked whether they have any relatives in China, both Sun-woo and Mom are quick to say no. It is Young-seo who unthinkingly blurts out that there is an uncle. Yoon-jin, who has contacted Sun-woo before for late because of work, is brought to the house by Ki-chul and his lackeys, and told to just do as she is ordered. Sun-woo brings Yoon-jin in, Mom's expression is icy but forced as she plays nice in front of her son. Sun-woo introduces Yoon-jin to everyone as the girl he is going to marry. Yoon-jin helps Mom do the dishes after dinner, but Mom mummers that she does not need her help. Sun-woo seems to know that leaving the two of them alone is a bad idea, so he noses in to ask what they are talking about. Mom motions for Young-seo to distract Eun-ah. After receiving an order to find a way to connect to Sun-woo's computer, Hyun-tae asks Sun-woo if he can use his computer to check his e-mail. Sun-woo directs him to the laptop in his room, but Hyun-tae's real mission is to hook something up to the router. Hyun-tae notices Sun-woo's photo album on the desk and takes a peek. His eyes settle on the same picture Sun-woo honed in on as he thinks back to Sun-woo snatching the 1988 explosion case file away from him. Something is not right. Chief Song gets to approach Dad about the passcode-cracking software his company has been developing, explaining that he cannot go through official channels because of the sensitivity of the information on the hard drive he has collected, Dad pretends to be happy to help. Yoon-jin asks Mom to give her Chief Song's telephone number so she can help hacking Song's phone. Yoon-jin calls from outside while Mom goes back in, catching Song with his phone out. Mom asks Song to take off his coat and get some tea, she drops Song's phone on the floor, picks it up and places on the spot with hacking device beneath. Sun-woo notices Mom and Yoon-jin are suddenly working like a team, he does not say anything, but grows curious when Mom disappears into her room to check the hack. Yoon-jin stops him before he goes inside by requesting him to open a jar. With Hyun-tae fiddling with the network, the van hacker is able to get into Dad's program when Dad opens it to demonstrate its capabilities to Chief Song, Dad discovers that there is nothing inside hard driver, Song explains that he did not bring the actual hard drive with him. Sun-woo finds one of Mom's pills on the bathroom counter, but is stopped from investigating the medicine cabinet when his sister announces that the guests are leaving. After the hacking dinner extravaganza, Chief Song's hacker calls to say that he did get to crack the password, but there is a second password that he cannot crack without being connected to Dad's company server. He sends through a bunch of code he managed to swipe before the second password was asked for, Chief Song underlines some numbers and draws a dollar sign next to them. When Sun-woo is driving home from Yoon-jin's apartment, he recognizes a surveillance van with the license plate he caught on the day Soo-yeon died. He follows it and calls Hyun-tae to tell him. All of a sudden, Sun-woo loses his ability to speak when he sees Ki-chul and Mom hovering nearby.
9	
10	
11	
12	
13	
14	
15	
16	

== Original soundtrack ==
- Code No.1（Date: January 9, 2015）

No.	Title	Artist	Length
1.	"그림자 (Shadow)"	Jung Yup	03:49
2.	"그림자 (Shadow)" (Inst.)

- Code No.2（Date: January 16, 2015）

No.	Title	Artist	Length
1.	"별먼지 (Star Dust)"	Zia	05:02
2.	"갈곳이없어 (Nowhere To Go) - For SPY"	Gummy	03:47
3.	"별먼지 (Star Dust)" (Inst.)
4.	"갈곳이없어 (Nowhere To Go) - For SPY" (Inst.)

- Code No.3（Date：January 23, 2015）

No.	Title	Artist	Length
1.	"Hero"	Min Kyung-hoon	03:22
2.	"Hero" (Inst.)

- Code No.4（Date：February 6, 2015）

No.	Title	Artist	Length
1.	"내눈속엔너 (My Everything)"	MAMAMOO	03:57
2.	"내눈속엔너 (My Everything)" (Inst.)

- Code No.5（Date：February 13, 2015）

No.	Title	Artist	Length
1.	"Goodbye"	JACE	03:47
2.	"Goodbye" (Inst.)

== Ratings ==
- In the table above, the blue numbers represent the lowest ratings and the red numbers represent the highest ratings.
- NR denotes that the drama did not rank in the top 20 daily programs on that date

Episode #	Original broadcast date	Average audience share			
Episode #	Original broadcast date	TNmS Ratings		AGB Nielsen	
Episode #	Original broadcast date	Nationwide	Seoul National Capital Area	Nationwide	Seoul National Capital Area
1	2015/01/09	7.4% (NR)	8.0% (NR)	8.5% (20th)	%
2	2015/01/09	7.5% (NR)	8.8% (19th)	7.9% (NR)	%
3	2015/01/16	6.2% (NR)	%	6.4% (NR)	%
4	2015/01/16	5.0% (NR)	%	5.9% (NR)	%
5	2015/01/23	5.0% (NR)	%	4.9% (NR)	%
6	2015/01/23	4.5% (NR)	%	5.3% (NR)	%
7	2015/01/30	3.8% (NR)	%	4.2% (NR)	%
8	2015/01/30	3.2% (NR)	%	3.8% (NR)	%
9	2015/02/06	3.3% (NR)	%	4.0% (NR)	%
10	2015/02/06	3.0% (NR)	%	3.9% (NR)	%
11	2015/02/13	4.2% (NR)	%	4.1% (NR)	%
12	2015/02/13	4.1% (NR)	%	3.9% (NR)	%
13	2015/02/27	3.8% (NR)	%	4.3% (NR)	%
14	2015/02/27	3.2% (NR)	%	3.8% (NR)	%
15	2015/03/06	3.6% (NR)	%	4.6% (NR)	%
16	2015/03/06	3.2% (NR)	%	4.1% (NR)	%
Average		4.44%	%	4.98%	%
