= George Nolfi =

American filmmaker

- Born: June 10, 1968 (age 58); Boston, Massachusetts, U.S.
- Education: Princeton University
- Occupations: Screenwriter; Director; Producer
- Years active: 2003–present

George Nolfi (born June 10, 1968) is an American filmmaker. He made his directorial debut in 2011 with sci-fi action, romance thriller, The Adjustment Bureau starring Matt Damon and Emily Blunt.

== Early life ==
Nolfi was born in Boston. He graduated summa cum laude from Princeton University, earning a bachelor's degree in public policy and was awarded a Marshall Scholarship to Oxford University where he studied philosophy. He then entered the PhD program in political science at UCLA with an eye toward a career in government and academia.

== Career ==
While working on his PhD dissertation at UCLA in 1997, Nolfi sold his first speculative script, Pathfinder, in a three-studio bidding war. It would ultimately convince him to change his career.

In 2003, Nolfi received his first screenwriting credit for the sci-fi film Timeline, a Michael Crichton bestselling book adaptation starring Paul Walker. His speculative screenplay Honor Among Thieves was adapted into Ocean’s Twelve (2004), with an all-star ensemble cast led by George Clooney and Brad Pitt. In 2006, Nolfi wrote and co-produced The Sentinel, a political action thriller starring Michael Douglas.

Nolfi is uncredited with rewriting the ending for Bourne Supremacy (2004) two weeks before its release. He returned to the Matt Damon spy thriller franchise in 2007 to co-write Bourne Ultimatum with Tony Gilroy, and Scott Z. Burns.

His continued working relationship with Damon lead to a feature directorial debut with The Adjustment Bureau (2011). The film was adapted from the 1954 Philip K. Dick short story classic titled "The Adjustment Team," which had been nominated for several awards. The story raises the questions of fate and whether we control our own destiny. Among some sci-fi cinephiles, The Adjustment Bureau is considered one of the most underrated sci-fi films.

Nolfi created, executive produced, and served as the principal director for the 2015 espionage television series Allegiance, which ran for one season on NBC. Allegiance was based on the Israeli television show The Gordin Cell, which was produced in 2011.

Nolfi directed and co-wrote The Banker (2020), starring Anthony Mackie and Samuel L. Jackson. The passion project, based on a true story, brought public awareness to two African American businessmen, heroes of their time, and to their endeavors to overcome racism and redlining. The film has been widely praised, particularly among the black community. In March 2021, The Banker won Outstanding Independent Motion Picture at the 52nd NAACP Image Awards.

In 2024, Nolfi and Mackie teamed up again for the post-apocalyptic action thriller Elevation. This was their third collaboration. Following a modest theatrical run (grossing approximately US$3.6 million on an $18 million budget), Elevation experienced a remarkable worldwide resurgence after its release on Amazon Prime Video (International) and HBO Max (domestic) in early 2025.

Nolfi's own first-hand research into the chaotic U.S. withdrawal from Afghanistan in August 2021 led him to write Kabul, a film script for Universal Pictures. Tom Hardy and Channing Tatum are attached to star in and also produce the project. In January 2025, Nolfi was hired to write the screenplay for an untitled Star Wars film directed by Sharmeen Obaid-Chinoy.

== Filmography ==
Film

Year	Title	Director	Writer	Producer
2003	Timeline	No	Yes	No
2004	Ocean's Twelve	No	Yes	No
2006	The Sentinel	No	Yes	Yes
2007	The Bourne Ultimatum	No	Yes	No
2011	The Adjustment Bureau	Yes	Yes	Yes
2016	Birth of the Dragon	Yes	No	No
2016	Spectral	No	Yes	No
2020	The Banker	Yes	Yes	Yes
2024	Elevation	Yes	No	Yes

Television

Year	Title	Director	Writer	Executive Producer	Developer	Notes
2015	Allegiance	Yes	Yes	Yes	Yes	Directed 4 episodes, wrote 2 episodes
