= Allegiance (American TV series) =

American television series

- Genre: Spy drama
- Based on: The Gordin Cell
- Developed by: George Nolfi
- Starring: Hope Davis; Scott Cohen; Gavin Stenhouse; Margarita Levieva; Morgan Spector; Alexandra Peters; Kenneth Choi
- Composer: Jay Kuo
- Country of origin: United States
- Original language: English
- No. of seasons: 1
- No. of episodes: 13 (8 aired online)

Production
- Executive producers: George Nolfi; Avi Nir; Ron Leshem; Amit Cohen; Yona Wisenthal; Giora Yahalom; John Glenn
- Camera setup: Single-camera
- Running time: 60 minutes
- Production companies: Nolfi Productions; Keshet International; yes; Universal Television

Original release
- Network: NBC
- Release: February 5 – March 5, 2015

Related
- The Gordin Cell; Spy

Allegiance is an American spy drama television series adapted from the Israeli series The Gordin Cell. The series premiered on February 5, 2015, on NBC.

On March 6, 2015, NBC canceled the series after five low-rated episodes. On March 12, 2015, NBC confirmed that the series would move online, and a new episode premiered in the U.S. via Hulu and NBC.com. The final episode of the series was released on April 30, 2015.

== Cast ==
=== Main ===
- Hope Davis as Katya O'Connor, a retired Russian intelligence operative. Her father was a KGB general who forcibly recruited her when she was 17 years old.
- Scott Cohen as Mark O'Connor, an American-born businessman who was recruited by Katya to spy for Russia.
- Gavin Stenhouse as Alex O'Connor, a gifted CIA analyst who is assigned to a joint FBI-CIA investigation into an SVR (Russian Foreign Intelligence Service) plot to destroy critical infrastructure within the United States. Until episode 4, he had no idea about his parents' and sister's spying. In episode 5, it is mentioned that he graduated from Princeton University with both a bachelor's and master's degree in three years.
- Margarita Levieva as Natalie O'Connor, eldest daughter of the O'Connor family. She is also an SVR spy and was recruited at age 20. She is dating Victor Dobrynin, her family's SVR handler.
- Morgan Spector as Victor Dobrynin, an SVR operative assigned to be Katya and Mark's handler when they are both reactivated. He is dating Natalie O'Connor.
- Alexandra Peters as Sarah O'Connor, youngest daughter of the O'Connor family.
- Kenneth Choi as Sam Luttrell, CIA Station Chief of New York.

=== Recurring ===
- Robert John Burke as Special Agent Brock, the FBI agent-in-charge of the joint FBI–CIA investigation.
- Floriana Lima as Special Agent Michelle Prado, an FBI agent who is partnered with Alex O'Connor on the joint FBI–CIA investigation.
- Fred Dalton Thompson as the Director of the FBI.
- Diane Farr as Elizabeth Simpson U.S. Department of Transportation, pipeline and hazardous materials safety administration.
- Giancarlo Esposito as Oscar Christoph / Marcus Bolivar / John Phillips.
- Paul Ben-Victor as Special Agent Faber.

== Production ==
On January 10, 2014, NBC ordered the series to pilot under a different title Coercion.

On February 14, 2014, Gavin Stenhouse was cast as a lead role. Hope Davis and Margarita Levieva were cast as female lead roles on February 24, 2014. The pilot was later ordered to a 13-episode series to premiere mid-season under the final title Allegiance on May 6, 2014. On December 12, 2014, NBC announced that the series would premiere on February 5, 2015, following The Blacklist as a part of the "All-New NBC Thursday" and replacing Parenthood.

Filming on the series finale ended on March 15, 2015.

== Episodes ==
No.	Title	Directed by	Written by	Original air / release date	Prod. code	US viewers (millions)
1	"Pilot"	George Nolfi	George Nolfi	February 5, 2015	101	4.98
When a Russian intelligence officer approaches New York CIA Station Chief Sam Luttrell (Kenneth Choi) with information relating to an SVR plot to destroy critical infrastructure within the United States, gifted CIA analyst in Russian affairs Alex O'Connor (Gavin Stenhouse) is brought on to assist a joint FBI-CIA investigation into it. Unbeknownst to him, his mother, father and older sister are part of a Russian sleeper cell that have been reactivated with the purpose of monitoring him and preventing the identities of key Russian assets from being revealed in the course of his investigation.
2	"Teamwork"	George Nolfi	Story by : Jon Worley; Teleplay by : John Glenn	February 12, 2015	102	3.65
Mark (Scott Cohen) and Katya (Hope Davis) are nearly exposed as spies by their own son, Alex. Then, in a brilliant bit of manipulation, Katya manages to convince Alex he is wrong. Katya's lies cause a rift between her and her husband and son. Victor is acutely warned of what will happen to him if he doesn't keep the O'Connors on a tight leash. Meanwhile, Alex partners with Agent Michelle Prado (Floriana Lima) as part of a joint CIA-FBI task force to find the hidden SVR cache before it's destroyed. Alex's unique perspective is the key to unmasking the identity of a new defector, leading to a deadly confrontation with an SVR hit team.
3	"Surreptitious Entry"	George Nolfi	George Nolfi	February 19, 2015	103	3.32
In the aftermath of a violent shootout, Alex must convince the FBI to risk a dangerous covert operation to find Mikhail's hidden cache. With Agent Prado at his side, Alex leads a team to Philadelphia to retrieve the laptop from a secure government building, but Victor (Morgan Spector) is a step ahead and orders the O'Connors to break in and steal the laptop first. Meanwhile, Katya discovers one of Natalie's (Margarita Levieva) most dangerous secrets, and forces her to choose between love and family.
4	"Chasing Ghosts"	George Nolfi	Eoghan Mahony	February 26, 2015	104	3.53
A shocking discovery leaves Alex struggling to reconcile his theories with the evidence found at City Hall, and Sam encourages him to keep looking for clues. Meanwhile, Mark and Katya must answer for their actions when the Rezident (David Vadim) doubts their commitment to the cause, and Natalie learns just how lethal Black Dagger will be if they don't stop it.
5	"Tipping Point"	Jeffrey Nachmanoff	Niceole R. Levy	March 5, 2015	105	3.28
When the FBI suspects a mole in the organization and brings in an investigator, Alex must confront his morals; Victor finds a new way to watch the O'Connors.
6	"Liars and Thieves"	Michael Smith	Jenna Richman	March 12, 2015 (US VoD)	106	N/A
Natalie must rely on an outsider for help finding important information on Black Dagger; Alex and Sam plan a risky sting operation; Katya wants Alex to throw the task force off track.
7	"Stranger in a Strange Land"	Jamie Barber	Brett Conrad	March 19, 2015 (US VoD)	107	N/A
Victor teams up with the O'Connor family to take down Black Dagger; task force members head to Italy; Sam poses as a businessman to deliver a suitcase of counterfeit cash.
8	"The Arrival"	Anton Cropper	Mimi Won Techentin	March 26, 2015 (US VoD)	108	N/A
Victor spies on the Rezident; Alex reveals a big secret to Michelle; Sam grows increasingly suspicious of the boy genius.
9	"Clean Hands"	George Nolfi	Whit Anderson	April 2, 2015 (US VoD)	109	N/A
Alex must deal with being framed for Michelle's murder.
10	"A Convenient Place to Die"	Kenneth Fink	John Glenn & Jon Worley	April 9, 2015 (US VoD)	110	N/A
Alex takes help from an unlikely source.
11	"Blowback"	Bronwen Hughes	Rashad Raisani & Jenna Richman	April 16, 2015 (US VoD)	111	N/A
Assuming their headquarters has been compromised, the task force relocates; the Rezident heads to the O'Connor home to hunt for evidence; Mark and Katya rush to Sarah's school as Alex lies bleeding in the back seat.
12	"Those Who Help Themselves"	Jeff T. Thomas	John Glenn & Rashad Raisani	April 23, 2015 (US VoD)	112	N/A
Alex has Katya send Sarah to a safe place while Sam is near to finding Cristoph, only for Elizabeth to throw in a wrench by revealing a secret of hers.
13	"Family Crisis"	Alex Zakrzewski	John Glenn & Rashad Raisani	April 30, 2015 (US VoD)	113	N/A
Alex and Cristoph officially meet while a gas plant is set to explode, and the heroes need every edge they can get to save the day.

== Reception ==
=== Critical response ===
The review aggregator website Rotten Tomatoes reports a 47% approval rating with an average rating of 5.6/10 based on 32 reviews by critics. Metacritic, which uses a weighted average, assigned a score of 57 out of 100 based on 28 reviews, indicating "mixed or average reviews".

== International broadcast ==
The series premiered in Australia on June 30, 2015, on SoHo.
