= Elevation (film) =

- Theatrical release poster
- Directed by: George Nolfi
- Written by: John Glenn; Jacob Roman; Kenny Ryan
- Produced by: Brad Fuller; John Glenn; George Nolfi; Joel Viertel; Jeremy Kipp Walker; Natalie Sellers; Alexander Black; Anthony Mackie
- Starring: Anthony Mackie; Morena Baccarin; Maddie Hasson
- Cinematography: Shelly Johnson
- Edited by: Joel Viertel
- Music by: H. Scott Salinas
- Production companies: Lyrical Media; Grinder Monkey; John Glenn Entertainment
- Distributed by: Vertical
- Release date: November 8, 2024
- Running time: 92 minutes
- Country: United States
- Language: English
- Budget: $18 million
- Box office: $3.6 million

Elevation is a 2024 American post-apocalyptic action thriller film directed by George Nolfi and written by Kenny Ryan and Jacob Roman. It stars Anthony Mackie, Morena Baccarin, and Maddie Hasson.

Elevation was released in the United States on November 8, 2024.

== Plot ==
Three years before the events of the film, mysterious apex predators called Reapers emerged from sinkholes underground and began exterminating humanity, with 95% killed in the first month. Survivors live in pocketed communities 8,000 feet or more above sea level — elevations that the creatures do not venture into.

Lost Gulch Refuge in Front Range, Colorado, is home to Will, a single father, and his son Hunter, who has a lung disease. Will is haunted by his wife Tara's death at the hands of Reapers during an expedition with Nina, a scientist, to discover the Reapers' weaknesses. After months of isolation, Hunter grows frustrated as neighboring communities conserve electricity by turning off radios and using flags to communicate. Will realizes he is running low on oxygen filters for Hunter. Despite Nina's warnings against going to Boulder, Colorado for more filters, Will persuades her to join him to reach her former lab and find a way to kill the Reapers.

Will's friend Katie joins them, and they enter the Elba Fire Road that leads them to a mine below the safety line. Nina has a compass device she invented that can detect a nearby Reaper due to their high bioelectromagnetic pulses. They gather supplies along the way, including a grenade launcher, and follow the road leading them to a former ski area. A Reaper spots them, but Will turns on the ski lift's backup generators, allowing the group to narrowly escape the Reaper above the safety line. They rest at the old lodge, where Nina explains that the Reapers do not eat or sleep, theorizing that they are not biological creatures.

The next morning, the group comes to a former mining tunnel Will knows from when he was a miner; however, the mines' lower levels dip below the safety line, and if they enter, Nina's compass will not warn them of nearby Reapers since it does not function underground. As they enter the mines, they find that the level above the safety line was welded shut during the initial invasion, forcing them to enter the lower levels. A Reaper then attacks the group, and its tendrils later drag Katie to her death. Nina and Will manage to escape and return to the surface above the safety line.

Nina wants to return to her lab for her stockpile of magnesium oxide, hypothesizing that the Reaper's impenetrable scales produce magnetic defense mechanisms and if one of the bullets is laced with a magnesium mineral, it will penetrate and kill the creature through internal combustion. They proceed to Boulder and manage to find oxygen filters in an abandoned hospital. A Reaper attacks them, but Will shoots at oxygen canisters to stall it, giving them enough time to escape. Will wants to get back to his son, but Nina convinces him to help her return to her former laboratory at the U.S. Department of Energy. Will learns that Nina lost her family to a Reaper attack while she was at work. Nina lets Will go back to his son while she researches how to kill the creatures. While she experiments with lacing bullets with a cobalt/magnesium mixture, a Reaper attacks her.

Will leaves in a pickup truck, but crashes due to a tire blowout, forcing him to run to the safety line while pursued by three Reapers. The Reapers corner him, but Nina arrives just in time, her successful experiment having allowed her to kill the Reaper that attacked her in the lab, and kills the Reapers with her Co/Mg-laced bullets, causing them to explode from internal combustion upon impact. They realize that the Reapers are not biological, but machines built using advanced alien technology, proving Nina's theory correct.

They return to Lost Gulch and Will reunites with Hunter. Nina raises a pirate flag for other nearby communities in the Rocky Mountains, signifying a Reaper has been killed. The communities resume radio contact and start arming themselves with Co/Mg-coated bullets to fight against the Reapers.

Sometime later, Nina looks through a telescope with Will at her side as three greenish meteorites enter orbit.

== Cast ==
- Anthony Mackie as Will
- Morena Baccarin as Nina
- Maddie Hasson as Katie
- Shauna Earp as Hannah, a townsperson
- Rachel Nicks as Tara, Will's late wife
- Danny Boyd Jr. as Hunter, Will and Tara's son
- Tyler Grey as Tim

== Production ==
In October 2022, it was announced a post-apocalyptic action thriller film titled Elevation was in development, with George Nolfi hired to direct and Kenny Ryan and Jacob Roman writing the screenplay. Anthony Mackie, Morena Baccarin, and Maddie Hasson were set to star. Principal photography began by November 2022, in Colorado, and had wrapped by late March 2023. Portions of the film were shot at Copper Mountain.

== Release ==
In May 2024, Vertical acquired rights to the film. Elevation was released in the United States on November 8, 2024.

== Reception ==
=== Box office ===
In the United States and Canada, Elevation was released alongside Heretic, The Best Christmas Pageant Ever, Weekend in Taipei, and Anora. The film debuted with $1.2 million from 1,416 theaters in its opening weekend, finishing 11th at the box office.

=== Critical response ===
On the review aggregator website Rotten Tomatoes, 55% of 55 critics' reviews are positive. The website's consensus reads: "Beautiful scenery and a solid star turn from Anthony Mackie raise Elevation up to an extent, but this sci-fi thriller is too derivative to reach the peak of its potential." Metacritic, which uses a weighted average, assigned the film a score of 50 out of 100, based on nine critics, indicating "mixed or average" reviews.

Zachary Lee of RogerEbert.com gave the film two and a half out of four stars and wrote, "So, while Elevation may never rise above its genre trappings or escape the shadow of its influences, it never stoops so low as to be mindlessly vapid. Simply executed at ninety minutes, it's escapism of the highest order, offering perils at a screen's distance of safety."

=== Streaming success ===
Following a modest theatrical run (grossing approximately US $3.6 million on an $18 million budget), Elevation experienced a remarkable worldwide resurgence after its international release on Amazon Prime Video and domestic release on HBO Max in the spring of 2025. As of September 2025 it has been in the top 10 on HBO Max for 83 days.

According to Collider, Parade, and MovieWeb, the film became a so‑called "sleeper hit" on Prime Video roughly a year after its theatrical debut, gaining traction particularly among fans of lead actor Anthony Mackie and benefitting from strong word‑of‑mouth and platform algorithms.

By mid‑July 2025, FlixPatrol analytics showed that Elevation had climbed into Amazon Prime Video’s Top 5 globally, often holding the #3 spot worldwide behind titles like The Accountant 2 and Heads of State.

FlixPatrol’s detailed tracking over the week of July 16–22, 2025 revealed consistent performance (as of July 22), with an average global ranking around #3, accumulating approximately 134–166 daily chart points, and reaching the number 1 position in several Latin American countries such as Argentina, Chile, Brazil, and Costa Rica on multiple days.
