= Gavin Stenhouse =

English actor (born 1986)

- Born: Gavin Rees Stenhouse; 4 April 1986 (age 40); British Hong Kong
- Education: Guildhall School of Music and Drama
- Occupation: Actor
- Years active: 2007–present
- Children: 2
- Website: gavinstenhouse.com

Gavin Rees Stenhouse (born 4 April 1986) is an English actor best known for his role as Evan Hartley in the television series reboot, Kung Fu (2021–2023), the Black Mirror episode: "San Junipero" (2016), and the television film Life-Size 2 (2018).

== Early life ==
Stenhouse was born and raised in Hong Kong and later moved to Lewes, England. His parents were an airline pilot and a teacher. He trained at the Guildhall School of Music and Drama.

== Career ==
Stenhouse has had small roles in the TV series Sofia's Diary (2008), Off the Hook (2009), American Horror Story: Coven (2013), Major Crimes (2013), and Person of Interest (2014). He also appeared in the film The Malay Chronicles: Bloodlines (2011).

Stenhouse played the Marquess of Dorset in the 2014 touring theatre production of Richard III with Kevin Spacey, directed by Sam Mendes. They performed over 200 times on three continents. The tour was followed by a documentary film crew, resulting in NOW: In the Wings on a World Stage.

In 2015 Stenhouse appeared as Alex O'Connor in the spy TV series, Allegiance. The same year, it was also announced that he would appear in the film Skybound.

In 2016 he appeared in "San Junipero", an episode of the anthology series, Black Mirror.

In 2018 Stenhouse co-starred in Freeform's Life-Size 2 opposite Tyra Banks and Francia Raisa.

In 2020 Stenhouse was cast as a series regular in The CW's modern reboot of Kung Fu. On 3 May 2021, Kung Fu was renewed by The CW for a second season.

== Personal life ==
Stenhouse is married and has two daughters.

== Filmography ==
Year	Title	Role	Notes
2007	Nearly Famous	Guitar guy	TV series (1 episode)
2008	Sofia's Diary!	Sean	TV series (1 episode)
2008	Fresh!	Todd	TV series
2009	Off the Hook	Todd	TV series (1 episode)
2010	Akinbalu	Edward Keene	TV miniseries
2011	The Malay Chronicles: Bloodlines	Marcus Carpenius	Feature film; a.k.a. Clash of Empires
2011	Iconicles	Nat	TV series (26 episodes)
2013	American Horror Story: Coven	Billy	Episode: "The Dead"
2013	Major Crimes	Jason Dietz	Episode: "All In"
2014	Person of Interest	Detective Jake Harrison	Episode: "Last Call"
2015	Allegiance	Alex O'Connor	Main role
2015	Z: The Beginning of Everything	F. Scott Fitzgerald	TV pilot only
2016	Black Mirror	Wes	Episode: "San Junipero"
2017	Skybound	Kyle	Feature film; lead role
2018	Timeless	Don Law	Episode: "The King of the Delta Blues"
2018	Life-Size 2	Calum	Television film
2018, 2024	9-1-1	Father Brian	6 episodes
2020	All Rise	Tommy Farrell	Episode: "I Love You, You're Perfect, I Think"
2020	Into the Dark	Bennie Taylor	Episode: "Pooka Lives"
2021–2023	Kung Fu	Evan Hartley	Main role
