= Eagle Eye =

2008 thriller film directed by D. J. Caruso

- Theatrical release poster
- Directed by: D. J. Caruso
- Screenplay by: John Glenn; Travis Adam Wright; Hillary Seitz; Dan McDermott
- Story by: Dan McDermott
- Produced by: Alex Kurtzman; Roberto Orci; Pat Crowley
- Starring: Shia LaBeouf; Michelle Monaghan; Rosario Dawson; Michael Chiklis; Anthony Mackie; Billy Bob Thornton
- Cinematography: Dariusz Wolski
- Edited by: Jim Page
- Music by: Brian Tyler
- Production companies: DreamWorks Pictures; K/O Productions
- Distributed by: DreamWorks/Paramount Distribution
- Release dates: September 16, 2008 (Hollywood); September 26, 2008 (United States)
- Running time: 117 minutes
- Country: United States
- Language: English
- Budget: $80 million
- Box office: $178 million

Eagle Eye is a 2008 American action thriller film directed by D. J. Caruso from a screenplay by John Glenn, Travis Adam Wright, Hillary Seitz and Dan McDermott. The film stars Shia LaBeouf, Michelle Monaghan, Rosario Dawson, Michael Chiklis, Anthony Mackie, and Billy Bob Thornton. Its plot follows two strangers who are forced to go on the run together after receiving a mysterious phone call from an unknown woman who uses information and communications technology to track their every move.

Eagle Eye was released in the United States on September 26, 2008. Despite receiving mixed-to-negative reviews from critics, the film grossed $178 million worldwide against an $80 million production budget.

== Plot ==
Stanford University dropout Jerry Shaw learns that his identical twin brother Ethan, an officer in the U.S. Air Force, has been killed in a car crash. Following the funeral, he is surprised to find a large sum of money in his bank account and his apartment filled with firearms and bomb-making materials.

Jerry receives a phone call from a woman who warns that the FBI is about to arrest him and he needs to run. Disbelieving the voice, he is caught by the FBI and interrogated by Tom Morgan, Supervising Agent assigned to the Joint Terrorism Task Force. While Morgan confers with Air Force OSI Special Agent Zoe Perez, the woman on the phone arranges for Jerry's escape and directs him to Rachel Holloman, a single mother. The woman on the phone is coercing Rachel by threatening her son Sam, who is aboard the Capitol Limited en route to the Kennedy Center in Washington, D.C., with his school band.

The woman on the phone helps the two avoid law enforcement by controlling networked devices including traffic lights, mobile phones, automated cranes, and even power lines. Meanwhile, the caller redirects a crystalline explosive to a gemcutter, who cuts it and fixes it into a necklace. Another man steals Sam's trumpet in Chicago and fits the crystal's sonic trigger into the tubing before forwarding it to Sam in Washington. Agent Perez is summoned by Secretary of Defense George Callister to be read into Ethan's job at the Pentagon. Ethan monitored the Department of Defense's top-secret intelligence-gathering supercomputer, the Autonomous Reconnaissance Intelligence Integration Analyst (ARIIA; /ɑːriːə/), which is being beta tested.

Callister leaves Pérez with Major William Bowman and ARIIA to investigate Ethan Shaw's death. Simultaneously, Rachel and Jerry learn that the woman on the phone is actually ARIIA, and that she has "activated" them according to the Constitution's authorization to recruit civilians for the national defense. Perez and Bowman find evidence that Ethan Shaw hid a memory card in ARIIA's chamber and leave to brief Callister. Afterwards, ARIIA smuggles Jerry and Rachel into her observation theater under the Pentagon. Both groups learn that after ARIIA's recommendation was ignored, a botched operation in Balochistan resulted in the deaths of U.S. citizens. Therefore, ARIIA concluded that the current executive branch must be removed to prevent more bloodshed, acting on behalf of "We the People". It cites the Declaration of Independence ("whenever any Form of Government becomes destructive of these ends, it is the Right of the People to alter or to abolish it").

Belatedly, Jerry learns he has been brought to circumvent biometric locks placed by his twin that prevent ARIIA from activating Operation Guillotine, a military simulation of maintaining government after the loss of all presidential successors. ARIIA had caused Ethan's accident in order to get rid of him. As Secretary Callister agreed with ARIIA's abort recommendation regarding Balochistan, he is to be the designated survivor and new president after the crystal detonates at the State of the Union (SOTU). Another of ARIIA's agents extracts Rachel from the Pentagon and gives her a dress and the explosive necklace to wear to the SOTU. Sam's school band has also been redirected to the United States Capitol to play for the President, bringing the trigger in Sam's trumpet and the explosive together.

Jerry is recaptured by Agent Morgan, who has become convinced of Jerry's innocence. Before sacrificing himself to stop an armed MQ-9 Reaper sent by ARIIA, Morgan gives Jerry his weapon and ID with which to gain entrance to the Capitol. Perez and Bowman begin to destroy ARIIA and - though they are successful - ARIIA is able to send the go signal for Guillotine before shutting down. Arriving in the House Chamber, Jerry fires the handgun in the air to disrupt the concert before being shot and wounded by the Secret Service.

Sometime later, Callister reports that ARIIA has been decommissioned and recommends against building another; the Shaw twins, Perez, and Morgan receive awards for their actions; and Jerry attends Sam's birthday party, earning Rachel's gratitude and a kiss.

== Cast ==
- Shia LaBeouf as Jerry Shaw, Ethan's twin brother, a Stanford University dropout and an intelligent but rebellious copy store employee struggling with financial responsibility
  - LaBeouf also plays Ethan Shaw, Jerry's twin brother, a US Air Force First Lieutenant assigned as a Minuteman to the ARIIA program
- Michelle Monaghan as Rachel Holloman, a woman who is being coerced by ARIIA
- Rosario Dawson as Zoë Perez, a US Air Force Captain and OSI Special Agent
- Michael Chiklis as Defense Secretary Callister
- Anthony Mackie as Major William Bowman, a US Army Minuteman assigned to the ARIIA program
- Ethan Embry as FBI Agent Toby Grant
- Billy Bob Thornton as FBI Agent Tom Morgan, Supervising Agent assigned to the Joint Terrorism Task Force
- Anthony Azizi as Ranim Khalid, an Iranian American music shop owner manipulated by ARIIA
- Cameron Boyce as Sam Holloman, Rachel's son
- Lynn Cohen as Mrs. Wierzbowski
- William Sadler as William Shaw

In addition, in an uncredited role, Julianne Moore is the voice of ARIIA, interacting (threatening) other characters throughout the film.

== Production ==
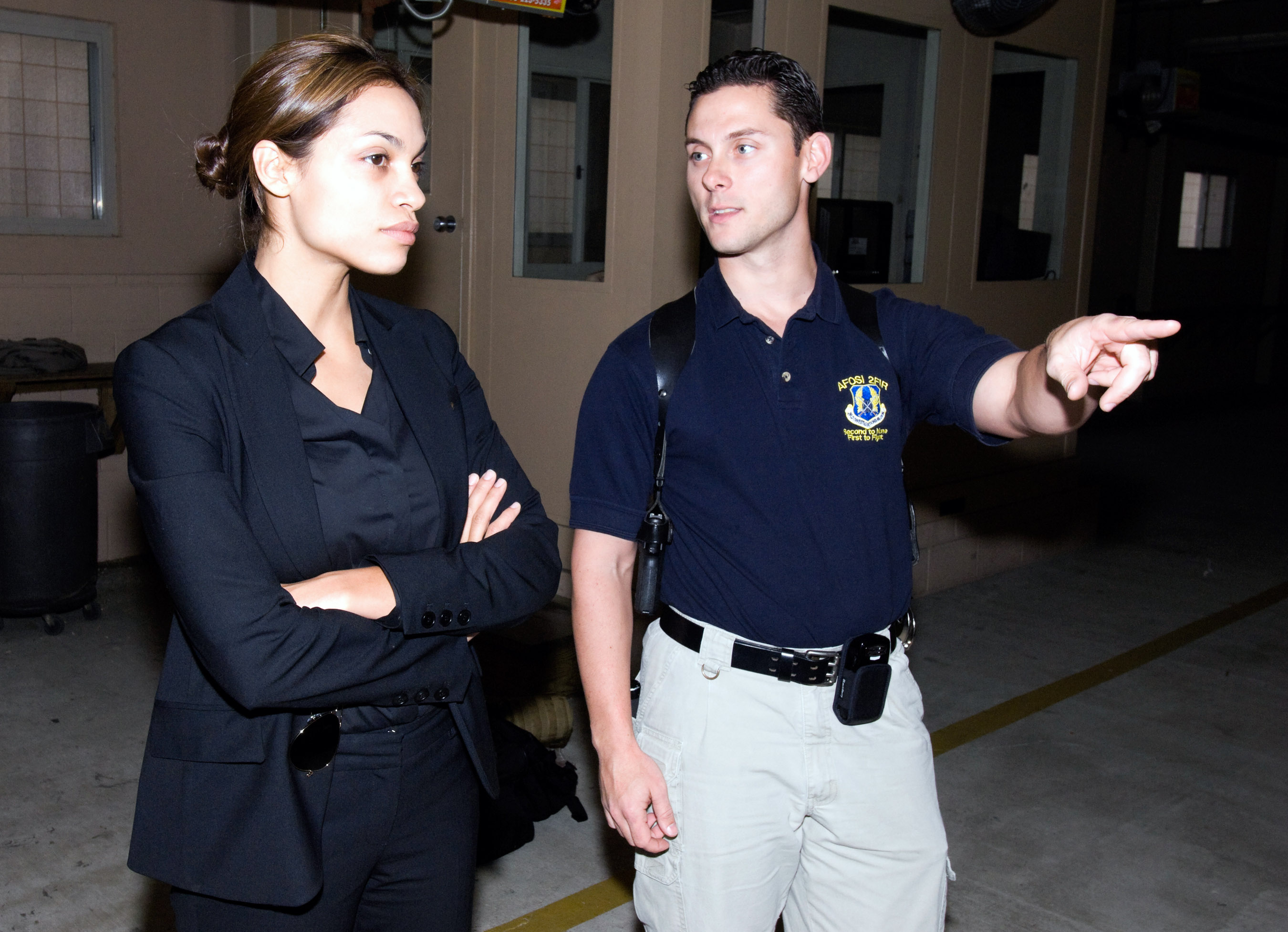
Rosario Dawson receiving a safety briefing from Special Agent Patrick McGee while researching her role as an AFOSI agent.

Dan McDermott wrote the original script for Eagle Eye based on an idea by Steven Spielberg, who had been inspired by Isaac Asimov's short story "All the Troubles of the World." DreamWorks then bought McDermott's script and set up the project to potentially be directed by Spielberg. When Spielberg became busy with Indiana Jones and the Kingdom of the Crystal Skull, he dropped out. D. J. Caruso, who had directed the 1996 television series High Incident, which Spielberg executive produced, replaced him. Spielberg remained as an executive producer. In June 2007, actor LaBeouf, who was involved in Spielberg's and Caruso's 2007 film Disturbia and Indiana Jones and the Kingdom of the Crystal Skull, re-joined the director and executive producer to star in Eagle Eye. McDermott's script was rewritten by John Glenn, Travis Wright, and Hillary Seitz in preparation for production. Filming began on November 6, 2007 and wrapped in February 2008. The film's visual effects were created by Sony Pictures Imageworks.

Caruso said by the time the film came to fruition twelve years later, "the technology had finally caught up to the storytelling... Everybody has a BlackBerry on their belt, and we think we're constantly being tracked. It's less science fiction than when Steven Spielberg conceived it." Caruso wanted to bring a gritty, 1970s-era sensibility to the film. Accordingly, a key chase scene in a high-tech package-processing hub on conveyor belts was shot without the use of computer-generated imagery. "It was like Chutes and Ladders for adults. It was pretty dangerous, and a lot of fun." While filming the scene, Monaghan suffered a welt after a cable brushed her neck and Caruso hit his head on a protruding bolt, and a cameraman suffered a puncture wound requiring stitches.

== Music ==
The music to Eagle Eye was composed by Brian Tyler, who recorded the score with an 88-piece ensemble of the Hollywood Studio Symphony at the Sony Scoring Stage. The session was interrupted by the Chino Hills earthquake on July 29, 2008.

== Promotion ==
The official website features an ARG type of gameplay system to promote the film. The voice previewed behind the phone in multiple trailers contacts the player, placing them in unique experiences. This has been called the "Eagle Eye Freefall Experience". While official cast listings do not list the name of the actress behind the mysterious voice featured in the film and trailers, Rosario Dawson confirmed at the Hollywood premiere that it belongs to Julianne Moore.

== Reception ==
=== Box office ===
Entertainment Weekly predicted the opening weekend could be as high as $31 million. The film grossed $29.1 million from 3,510 theaters in the United States and Canada, taking the number one position at the box office. The film went on to gross $101 million in the United States and Canada and $77 million in other territories for a worldwide total of $178 million, against a production budget of $80 million.

=== Critical response ===
On Rotten Tomatoes, the film holds an approval rating of 27% based on 181 reviews, with an average rating of 4.70/10. The site's critical consensus reads, "Eagle Eye is a preposterously plotted thriller that borrows heavily from other superior films." Metacritic gave the film an average score of 43 out of 100, based on reviews from 28 critics, indicating "mixed or average" reviews. Audiences polled by CinemaScore gave the film an average grade of "B+" on an A+ to F scale.

Roger Ebert of the Chicago Sun-Times gave the film two out of four stars, saying: "The word 'preposterous' is too moderate to describe Eagle Eye. This film contains not a single plausible moment after the opening sequence, and that's borderline. It's not an assault on intelligence. It's an assault on consciousness." James Berardinelli of ReelViews gave the film one and a half stars out of four, saying: "This movie tests the viewing public's tolerance for enduring crass stupidity when the payoff is a series of repetitive, ADD-infected chase scenes. Director D.J. Caruso does a moderately good job of hiding how incredibly dumb this screenplay is by keeping things moving at such a whirlwind pace that a lot more seems to be happening than actually is. In reality, the chase scenes don't mean anything because they don't advance the plot—it's mice on a treadmill, running and running and not getting anywhere." The Hollywood Reporter called it a "slick, silly techno-thriller" and "Even those who surrender all disbelief at the door will be hard pressed not to smirk at some of the wildly improbable plotting."

Josh Rosenblatt of The Austin Chronicle enjoyed the film, calling it "good, manic fun plus a heavy dose of political intrigue adding up to two hours of clamorous, mind-numbing nonsense" while drawing favorable comparisons to Enemy of the State and The Terminator series. William Arnold of the Seattle Post-Intelligencer also gave Eagle Eye a positive review, remarking that it's "engrossing as an intellectual puzzle" and "a solid thriller." Mark Bell of Film Threat said: "the film isn't a complete waste of your time [...] but don't expect anything brilliant." Neely Tucker of The Washington Post said that Eagle Eye is "sometimes entertaining" but "doesn't have much to say." Lisa Schwarzbaum of Entertainment Weekly called it "A brain-squandering thriller." Robert Koehler of Variety felt that the film's "first 35 minutes sizzle" but "the story [becomes] near-parody in the final act."

=== Accolades ===
Eagle Eye was a nominee for a 2009 Saturn Award for Best Science Fiction Film and was nominated by the Visual Effects Society Awards in the category of Outstanding Supporting Visual Effects in a Feature Motion Picture.

== Home media ==
Eagle Eye was released on DVD and Blu-ray only in select stores on December 26, 2008, three months after its theatrical release, September 26, 2008. In the first week on the DVD sales chart, Eagle Eye sold 182,592 units which translated to US$3,300,000 (equivalent to about $4,930,000 in 2025) in revenue. In the second week 1,044,682 DVD units were sold, taking the No. 1 sales rank and earning US$18,862,151 (equivalent to $28,306,392 in 2025) for that week. As per the figures from April 5, 2009, 2,181,959 units had been sold in total, bringing in $36,574,940 in total revenue from DVD home media sales. This does not include Blu-ray sales or DVD rentals.

The next day, it was released nationwide. iTunes released it a month later as a rental and buy.

== Mobile game ==
A mobile game based on the film was developed and published by Magmic Games. It was released for BlackBerry, Windows Mobile, BREW, and Java ME devices prior to the film's launch. There are also two games on the film's web site.

== See also ==
- Billion Dollar Brain
- Defense Advanced Research Projects Agency
  - Combat Zones That See
- List of films featuring drones
- List of films featuring surveillance
