= John Glenn (screenwriter) =

American screenwriter and film director

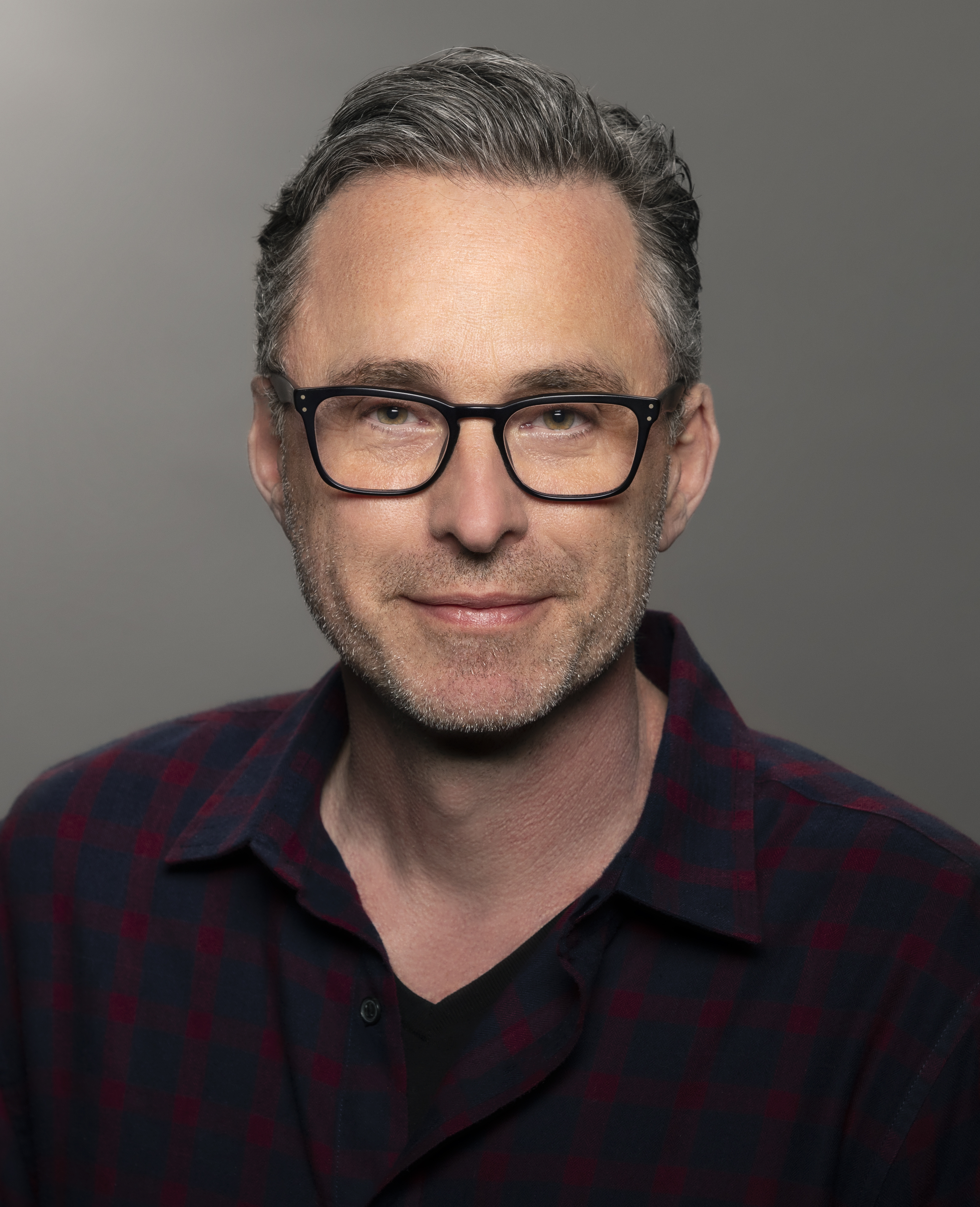
- Born: John Patrick Glenn; December 18, 1971 (age 54); Tuscaloosa, Alabama, U.S.
- Education: Art Center College of Design
- Occupations: Producer, director, screenwriter
- Organization(s): Writers Guild of America; Directors Guild of America
- Children: 3

John Patrick Glenn is an American screenwriter, producer, director, and showrunner. He launched his career in 1999 when he sold his speculative screenplay Red World to Jerry Bruckheimer and Walt Disney Pictures.

== Television career ==
Glenn sold his first television show, Black Star, in 2001 to UPN. He has continued to create, write, produce, and direct dozens of projects throughout the last 20 years. Most notably he has created and produced Identity (ABC Studios), The Hatfields and McCoys (NBC/ABC Studios), Tin Man (NBC and Universal Television Studios), Allegiance (NBC and Universal Television Studios), Miranda's Rights (NBC and Universal Television Studios), and SEAL Team (as showrunner, CBS Studios and CBS Network). Over the course of his extensive career, Glenn has developed, sold, and produced over three dozen projects to every major network, including ABC, NBC, CBS, and Fox. Prior to taking over SEAL Team, Glenn's production company, John Glenn Entertainment, was based at NBC/Universal on the Universal studio lot. During Glenn's successful 4-year tenure with NBC/Universal, he sold and produced multiple projects, and served as Executive Producer on the NBC drama, Allegiance. Glenn moved his company to CBS in September 2017. Glenn wrote and produced the feature Elevation, starring Anthony Mackie and Morena Baccarin, which was released in Fall 2024. He is currently working on The Assassin at MAX and a historically based vision of Robin Hood set up at Lionsgate & MGM, slated for a 2025 release.

== Film career ==
Glenn has scripted feature films for every major studio, including Journey to the Center of the Earth, Clash of the Titans and The Lazarus Project (which Glenn wrote and directed). In 2008, he delivered a page one rewrite of Eagle Eye that Steven Spielberg attached to direct. Glenn also worked on re-imaginings for Blade Runner with producer Bud Yorkin, and for The Warriors with director Tony Scott. He produced the film Disaster with Roy T. Wood as the director and just recently sold two more films as of 2021.

Glenn has partnered with producers such as Mark Gordon, Peter Chernin, Bert Salke, Roma Downy, and Kurtzman-Orci. He has worked with notable directors such as M. Night Shyamalan, Paul W. S. Anderson, McG, and actors Charlize Theron, Sophia Bush, Marcia Gay Harden, Virginia Madsen, Jason O'Mara, David Boreanaz, and Angela Bassett,

== Personal life ==
Glenn was born on December 18, 1971, in Tuscaloosa, Alabama and attended the Art Center College of Design in Pasadena, California. He currently resides outside of Los Angeles in San Marino, California with his wife and three children.

== Filmography ==
=== Films ===
- Elevation (2024) - as Producer, Screenwriter
- Run the Night (2024) - as Producer, Screenwriter
- Merlin (2024) - as Producer, Screenwriter
- The Debt (2024) - as Producer
- Cut & Run (2023) - as Producer, Screenwriter
- Knights of the Borrowed Dark (2018) - as Producer, Screenwriter
- Abducted (2013) - as Screenwriter
- Dog Show (2011) - as Producer
- Junkers (2009) - as Screenwriter
- Eagle Eye (2008) - as Screenwriter
- Law Abiding Citizen (2008) - PRODUCTION REWRITE as Screenwriter
- The Lazarus Project (2008) - as Director, Screenwriter
- Disaster (2006) - as Producer
- The Source (2005) - as Screenwriter
- Radiant (2004) - as Screenwriter
- The Warriors (2003) - as Screenwriter
- Blade Runner v.2 (2003) - as Screenwriter
- Clash of the Titans (2002) - as Screenwriter (uncredited)
- Journey to the Center of the Earth (2000) - as Screenwriter
- Red World (1999) - as Screenwriter

=== Television ===
- Robin Hood (2025) - as Showrunner, Creator, Executive Producer
- The Assassin (2024) - as Showrunner, Creator, Executive Producer
- The Miller Line (2024) - as Showrunner, Overseeing Pilot & Writers for the Studio
- Miami Law (2024) - as Showrunner, Creator, Executive Producer with Matt Lopez
- The HURT Unit (2023) - as Showrunner, Creator, Executive Producer with Matt Lopez
- Last Light (2022) - as Consulting Producer/Rewrites & Reshoots
- The House on Hoarder Hill (2021) - as Showrunner, Writer, Executive Producer
- Viola Wells (2020) - as Showrunner, Creator, Executive Producer
- Cabin Fever (2018-2019) - as Executive Producer
- SEAL Team (2018–19) - as Showrunner / Executive Producer
- Trader (2018) - as Showrunner, Creator, Executive Producer
- Murder Room (2018) - as Showrunner, Creator, Executive Producer
- My Fair Baby (2017) - as Creator, Executive Producer
- Samuri (2017) - as Executive Producer
- The Evidence Room (2016) - as Creator, Writer, Executive Producer
- Dreamer (2016) - as Executive Producer
- Under Suspicion (2016) - as Executive Producer
- Heavenly Creatures (2015-2016) - as Creator, Writer, Executive Producer
- Miranda's Rights (2015-2016) - as Executive Producer
- Caesar (2015-2016) - as Executive Producer
- Coyote (2015-2016) - as Writer, Executive Producer (with David Goyer)
- The Possession of Maggie Gill (2014-2015) - as Creator, Writer, Executive Producer
- Last Hour (2014-2015) - as Executive Producer
- Critical (2014-2015) - as Executive Producer
- Justice (2014-2015) - as Executive Producer
- Allegiance (2014) - as Executive Producer
- Domino (2013-2014) - as Creator, Writer, Executive Producer
- Ghost Projekt (2013-2014) - as Creator, Writer, Executive Producer
- Conception (2013-2014) - as Creator, Writer, Executive Producer
- Tin Man (2013-2014) - as Executive Producer
- The Hatfields and McCoys (2012-2013) - as Creator, Writer, Executive Producer
- Lost Horizon (2012) - as Creator, Writer, Executive Producer
- Treasure Island (2011) - as Creator, Writer, Executive Producer
- Kate Warne (2011) - as Executive Producer
- Identity (2010-2011) - as Creator, Writer, Executive Producer
- Treadstone (2010) - as Creator, Writer, Executive Producer
- Fallen (2009) - as Creator, Writer, Executive Producer
- Fix It Men (2008) - as Creator, Writer, Executive Producer
- Mercy (2007) - as Creator, Writer, Executive Producer
- Bullet (2006) - as Creator, Writer, Executive Producer
- Drift (2005-2006) - as Creator, Writer, Executive Producer
- McCabe (2005-2006) - as Creator, Writer, Executive Producer
- Silverlake (2004) - as Creator, Writer, Executive Producer
- Deegan's Century (2004) - as Creator, Writer, Co-Executive Producer
- Payback (2002) - as Creator, Writer, Co-Executive Producer
- Black Star (2001) - as Creator, Writer, Producer
