= The Lazarus Project (film) =

- DVD cover
- Directed by: John Patrick Glenn
- Written by: John Patrick Glenn; Evan Astrowsky
- Produced by: David Hoberman; Todd Lieberman; Travis Adam Wright
- Starring: Paul Walker; Linda Cardellini; Piper Perabo; Malcolm Goodwin; Tony Curran; Bob Gunton; Lambert Wilson
- Cinematography: Jerzy Zielinski
- Edited by: Fred Raskin
- Music by: Brian Tyler
- Distributed by: Sony Pictures Home Entertainment
- Release date: October 21, 2008
- Running time: 100 minutes
- Country: United States
- Language: English

The Lazarus Project (formerly known as The Heaven Project) is a 2008 American drama/thriller film directed and written by John Patrick Glenn. It stars Paul Walker as Ben, a former criminal who gets a second chance at life after mysteriously waking up employed at a psychiatric hospital. Piper Perabo, Linda Cardellini, Malcolm Goodwin, Tony Curran, and Bob Gunton also star in the film, which was released on DVD on October 21, 2008.

== Premise ==
Ben Garvey, a reformed criminal, loses his job because of his criminal background. His brother Ricky comes to visit after being released from jail and convinces him to commit a robbery of gold dust from a laboratory. The heist goes horribly wrong, and Ricky and two others are killed. Sentenced to death, Ben gets a visit from his wife and daughter; Ben tells his daughter that he's not coming back. He then goes and prepares himself for the lethal injection. Ben is presumably put to death, but is next shown hitching a ride from an unknown man who asks if he is the new groundskeeper of a nearby psychiatric hospital in a small Oregon town. Ben is told that he has been given a second chance from God and to begin work as a groundskeeper at the local mental hospital. Ben wants to go home but is denied and as time goes on, and with a wife and daughter he left behind, he wonders whether he has truly cheated death or if he has become part of a far more sinister scientific plan for both him and the other inmates at the hospital.

== Cast ==
- Paul Walker as Ben Garvey, an ex-con who gets a second chance at life and begins work at a psychiatric hospital.
- Linda Cardellini as Julie Ingram, the hospital's psychiatrist who takes interest in helping Ben.
- Malcolm Goodwin as Robbie, one of the hospital's patients.
- Tony Curran as William Reeds, an extremely violent psychopath who claims to know why Ben is at the hospital.
- Bob Gunton as Father Ezra, a priest who also runs the hospital.
- Piper Perabo as Lisa Garvey, Ben's wife.
- Lambert Wilson as Avery, a mysterious figure that keeps appearing to offer unwanted guidance.
- Shawn Hatosy as Ricky Garvey, Ben's brother.
- Brooklynn Proulx as Katie Garvey, Ben's daughter.

== Themes ==
The title refers to the New Testament character Lazarus. In chapter 11 of the Gospel of St. John, Lazarus is raised from the dead by Jesus after having been entombed for four days. Otherwise, nothing in the film's plot parallels the New Testament story; in fact, the film's protagonist rebels against those who "raised" him from the dead, something inconceivable for the character Lazarus.

== Production ==
Written and directed by John Patrick Glenn in his directorial debut, production was originally slated for September 2005 with Mandeville Films but was ultimately delayed. Production finally began in March 2007 with filming beginning on April 27, 2007, in Brandon, Manitoba, Canada. Although the film script refers to several small Oregon towns — Mount Angel, Silverton, and Dundee — the filming was not done there.

The film marked the first company credit for Be Good Productions, a production company created by Paul Walker, Brandon Birtell and Tim Whitcome.

Composer Brian Tyler recorded the score for the film. He stated that, "This one is going to be an ensemble type of score, very introspective, very heartfelt, it is a movie about purgatory and it's going to be different than anything I've done before, and I am really happy and very excited doing it."

=== Music ===
The soundtrack for The Lazarus Project was released by Varèse Sarabande on March 3, 2009. All of its compositions were produced by Brian Tyler.

No.	Title	Length
1.	"Jaybird"	3:30
2.	"The Lazarus Project"	3:00
3.	"Discovery"	5:56
4.	"The Divide"	2:33
5.	"Cold Harbor"	1:52
6.	"Avery"	3:07
7.	"Julie in the Cabin"	3:20
8.	"A New Life"	3:20
9.	"The Break In"	4:08
10.	"Passagesscapia"	3:01
11.	"The Jumper"	2:46
12.	"Glimpses"	2:27
13.	"The Revelation"	3:02
14.	"Voices from the Past"	2:53
15.	"The Forest"	2:33
16.	"Portraits"	3:30
17.	"I Want to Forget"	2:30
18.	"The Lazarus Project End Title"	3:52

== Reception ==
The Lazarus Project received mixed reactions from critics. As of June 2020, the film holds a 60% approval rating on Rotten Tomatoes, based on five reviews with an average rating of 5.43/10.
