= David Boreanaz =

American actor (born 1969)

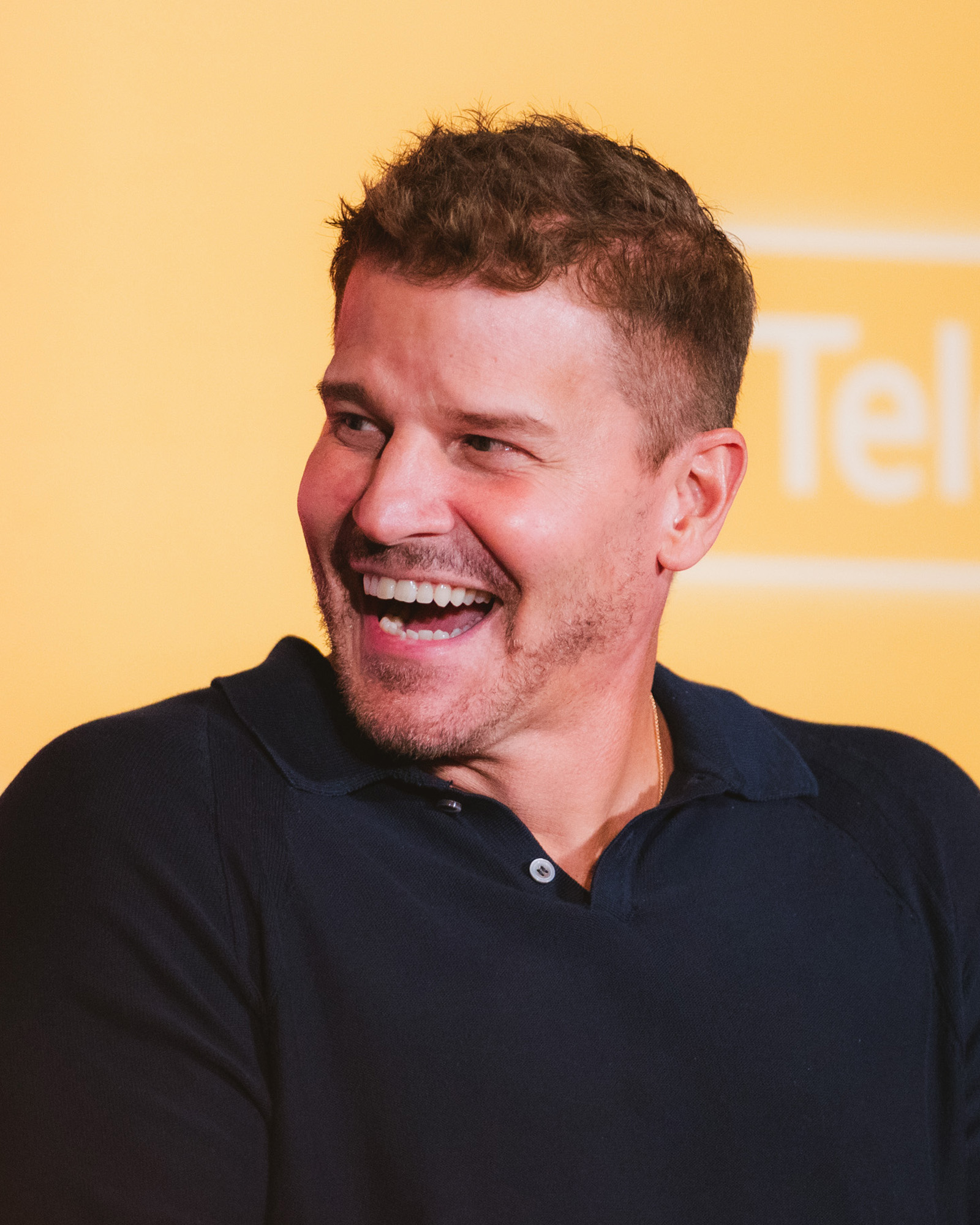
- Boreanaz in 2025
- Born: David Paul Boreanaz; May 16, 1969 (age 57); Buffalo, New York, U.S.
- Education: Ithaca College
- Occupations: Actor; producer; director
- Years active: 1993–present
- Known for: Angel in Buffy the Vampire Slayer and Angel; Seeley Booth in Bones; Jason Hayes in SEAL Team; James Rockford in The Rockford Files
- Spouses: Ingrid Quinn (m. 1997; div. 1999) Jaime Bergman (m. 2001)
- Children: 2
- Parent(s): Dave Roberts; Patti Boreanaz

David Paul Boreanaz (/bɔːriˈɑːnəs/; born May 16, 1969) is an American actor, television producer, and director known for playing the roles of vampire-turned-private investigator Angel on The WB/UPN supernatural drama television series Buffy the Vampire Slayer (1997–2003) and its spin-off Angel (1999–2004); FBI Special Agent Seeley Booth, a homicide investigator, on the Fox television crime procedural comedy-drama series Bones (2005–2017); and United States Navy SEAL Master Chief Petty Officer Jason Hayes on the CBS/Paramount+ military drama series SEAL Team (2017–2024). He is set to star in the NBC reboot of The Rockford Files in 2027, on which he will also serve as a producer.

== Early life ==
David Paul Boreanaz was born in Buffalo, New York, where his father Dave Roberts (born David Thomas Boreanaz) was working for ABC affiliate WKBW-TV as a weather presenter and host of children's show Rocketship 7. His mother Patti Boreanaz was a travel agent. He has two older sisters. He is of Italian and Slovenian descent on his father's side. His mother is of half Slovak and part Irish, German, French, and Swiss descent.

When Boreanaz was seven years old, the family moved to the Philadelphia, Pennsylvania, area after his father took a job at local ABC affiliate, WPVI-TV. Boreanaz was raised Catholic and attended Rosemont School of the Holy Child at Rosemont, Pennsylvania, and then high school at Malvern Preparatory School in Malvern, Pennsylvania, where he was a keen athlete and played on the school football team. He graduated from Ithaca College in Ithaca, New York, in 1991 with a degree in cinema and photography.

== Career ==
Boreanaz moved to Los Angeles with a degree in filmmaking, but found, like many other struggling actors, gaining work initially difficult. Boreanaz slept on a couch at his sister's place, visiting film sets and doing production assistant work to learn more about the industry in which he hoped to be more involved. He was a background extra in the 1993 film Aspen Extreme as a fan waving at skiers. He also prepared props for Best of the Best II (also released in 1993), which stars Eric Roberts, where he also had a small uncredited role; Boreanaz is seen briefly standing to the left, as the characters Tommy Lee and Alex enter a nightclub (which is a front for an illegal fighting ring).

Boreanaz's first paid acting appearance was a 1993 guest spot on the American sitcom Married... with Children, as Kelly's unfaithful biker boyfriend, who gets pummeled by her father, Al. He was cast in the television series Buffy the Vampire Slayer, after being suggested for the role to Marti Noxon by one of Boreanaz's neighbors, after he was seen walking his dog past their house on a regular basis. In the cult series, he played the mysterious Angel, a vampire cursed by the Romani people with a soul as punishment for his murdering a Romani girl; this initially resulted in debilitating remorse and then a life of contrition. The show became enormously successful and Boreanaz starred in a spin-off series, Angel, which gave the character a chance to evolve and concentrated on Angel's battle for redemption for the numerous murders he had committed before regaining his soul. He appeared on Buffy from 1997 to 1999, when he began starring in Angel, which ran until 2004, with a recurring role on Buffy after his departure. He also appeared in the film Macabre Pair of Shorts, wherein he plays a vampire's victim (in the segment "MPS").

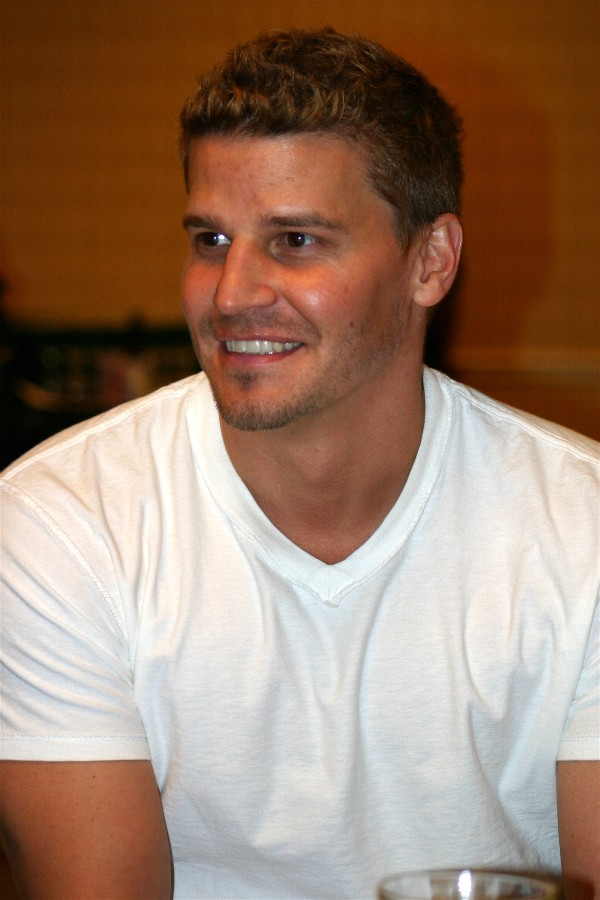
Boreanaz at Flashback Weekend 2004

Boreanaz's only starring role in a major theatrical film was in 2001's slasher horror film Valentine, alongside Denise Richards and Katherine Heigl. In 2002, he had a supporting role in the film I'm with Lucy. In 2003, he appeared in the music video for singer Dido's hit single "White Flag", and was the voice of Leon (Squall Leonhart) in the video game Kingdom Hearts, but did not reprise his role in the sequel.

In 2005, Boreanaz began starring opposite Emily Deschanel on the primetime television series Bones. He also appeared in These Girls, a Canadian film in which he played a biker; the film received a limited theatrical release in Canada in March 2006, after premiering at the Toronto International Film Festival and the Vancouver International Film Festival. He has also starred in the independent films Mr. Fix It and Suffering Man's Charity (released on DVD as Ghost Writer), as well as the direct-to-DVD sequel The Crow: Wicked Prayer in which he starred alongside Tara Reid. In 2006, he starred in another DVD release, The Hard Easy, which also starred Steve Buscemi, Vera Farmiga, and Nick Lachey.

In that same year, he voiced Hal Jordan in the direct-to-video DC Comics animated feature Justice League: The New Frontier. In the season-three finale of his TV series Bones, Boreanaz's character Seeley Booth is seen in his bathtub reading an issue of Green Lantern. As well as being a producer on Bones since its third season, Boreanaz also directed at least one episode every season since season four. BuddyTV ranked him number 13 on its "TV's 100 Sexiest Men of 2010" list and number 18 in 2011.

In the 2011 film The Mighty Macs, Boreanaz played the role of Ed T. Rush, NBA referee and husband of Immaculata basketball coach Cathy Rush. In 2013, Boreanaz starred in the miniseries Full Circle as Jace Cooper. The same year, Boreanaz starred in the independently made fantasy drama Officer Down as Detective Les Scanlon. Boreanaz has also appeared on American Dad! as Seeley Booth in the episode "Less Money, Mo' Problems", on Family Guy as himself in the episode "Road to the North Pole", and in the Baby Blues episode "Teddy-Cam" as the voice of Johnny.

On March 22, 2017, Boreanaz joined the cast of a CBS drama project based on the United States Navy SEALs. The project received a series order on May 12, 2017, and became known as SEAL Team, which premiered on September 27, 2017.

On February 12, 2026, Boreanaz joined the cast of NBC drama project called The Rockford Files based on the 1970s original series. The project received a series order on May 8, 2026.

== Personal life ==
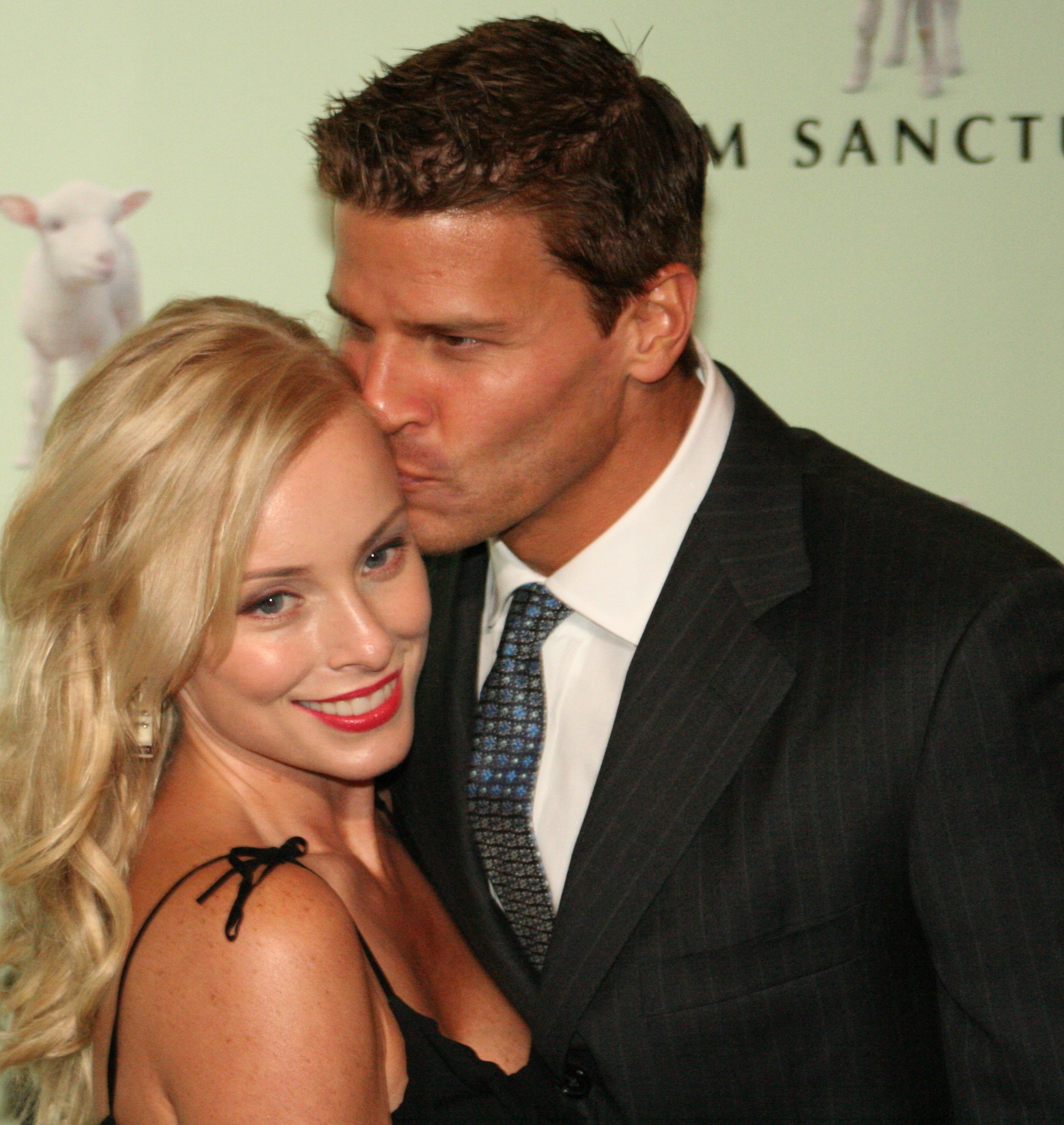
Boreanaz and wife Jaime Bergman in 2006

Boreanaz was married to Ingrid Quinn from 1997 to 1999. He wed Playboy model Jaime Bergman on November 24, 2001. They have a son, Jaden Rayne Boreanaz, born May 1, 2002, and a daughter, Bella Vita Bardot Boreanaz (born Bardot Vita Boreanaz), born August 31, 2009.

In 2004, Boreanaz underwent reconstructive surgery on the anterior cruciate ligament of his left knee, a result of a running injury he suffered in high school that was not fully corrected at that time. His recovery did not prevent Angel production from continuing, but did limit his mobility and physical activities in several episodes, including his directorial debut, "Soul Purpose".

In 2010, Boreanaz admitted to having an extramarital affair with Rachel Uchitel, the same woman with whom Tiger Woods was alleged to have cheated on his wife. Boreanaz has claimed that Uchitel tried to blackmail him. At the time of Boreanaz's affair, his wife was pregnant.

Boreanaz, his wife, and their friends Melissa and Aaron Ravo started the nail polish line Chrome Girl in 2013. The two wives run the day-to-day operations, while their husbands help with the overall business. Boreanaz was involved with the creation of the NHL colors line and supports them publicly, while Aaron, who works in advertising, has helped out with public relations work and marketing.

Boreanaz is a hockey fan and an avid supporter of the Philadelphia Flyers and Philadelphia Eagles.

=== Sexual harassment lawsuit ===
A co-worker on the set of Bones sued Boreanaz in 2010 for sexual harassment, stating he repeatedly attempted to kiss and fondle her. In March 2011, the woman's attorney requested the lawsuit be dismissed, stating the matter was resolved.

== Filmography ==
=== Film ===
Year	Title	Role	Notes
1993	Aspen Extreme	Spectator	Uncredited
1993	Best of the Best II	Parking Valet	Uncredited
1996	Macabre Pair of Shorts	Dinner (segment "MPS")	
2001	Valentine	Adam Carr	
2002	I'm with Lucy	Luke	
2005	The Crow: Wicked Prayer	Luc "Death" Crash / Lucifer	
2006	These Girls	Keith Clark	
2006	Mr. Fix It	Lance Valenteen	
2006	The Hard Easy	Roger Hargitay	
2007	Suffering Man's Charity	Sebastian St. Germain	Direct to video
2008	Justice League: The New Frontier	Hal Jordan / Green Lantern (voice)	Direct to video
2009	The Mighty Macs	Ed Rush	Limited release
2013	Officer Down	Det. Les Scanlon	Direct to video

=== Television ===
Year	Title	Role	Notes
1993	Married... with Children	Frank	Episode: "Movie Show"
1997–2003	Buffy the Vampire Slayer	Angel	Recurring (season 1), main role (seasons 2 & 3), guest (seasons 4, 5 & 7); Nominated - Kids' Choice Award for Favorite Television Friends (shared with Sarah Michelle Gellar); Nominated - Teen Choice Award for Choice TV Actor
1999–2004	Angel	Angel	Main role Also director (1 episode); Saturn Award for Best Actor on Television (2000, 2003 & 2004); Nominated - Saturn Award for Best Actor on Television (2001 & 2002); Nominated - Satellite Award for Best Actor – Television Series Drama; Nominated - Teen Choice Award for Choice TV Actor
2002	Baby Blues	Johnny (voice)	Episode: "Teddy-Cam"
2003	Themistokles: The Hero of Marathon	Themistokles	Television film
2005	Punk'd	Himself	Episode: "Episode #6.3"
2005–2017	Bones	Seeley Booth	Main role Also director and producer Nominated - People's Choice Award for Favorite TV Drama Actor; Nominated - Teen Choice Award for Choice TV Actor: Drama (2006, 2011 & 2012)
2010	Family Guy	Aurora Boreanaz	Episode: "Road to the North Pole"
2012	American Dad!	Seeley Booth (voice)	Episode: "Less Money, Mo' Problems"
2013	Full Circle	Jace Cooper	3 episodes
2015	Sleepy Hollow	Seeley Booth	Episode: "Dead Men Tell No Tales"
2017–2024	SEAL Team	Jason Hayes	Main role Also director and producer/executive producer
2018	America's Game	Narrator	Episode: "The 2017 Philadelphia Eagles"
2027	The Rockford Files	James Rockford	Main role Also producer

=== Video games ===
Year	Title	Voice role	Notes
2002	Buffy the Vampire Slayer	Angel	
2002	Kingdom Hearts	Leon	English dub
2013	Kingdom Hearts HD 1.5 Remix	Leon	Stock footage; English dub

=== Music video ===
Year	Title	Artist
2003	"White Flag"	Dido
