= List of SEAL Team characters =

This is an overview of the regular, recurring, and other characters of the TV series SEAL Team.

== Main characters ==
=== Jason Hayes ===
Jason Hayes
- SEAL Team character
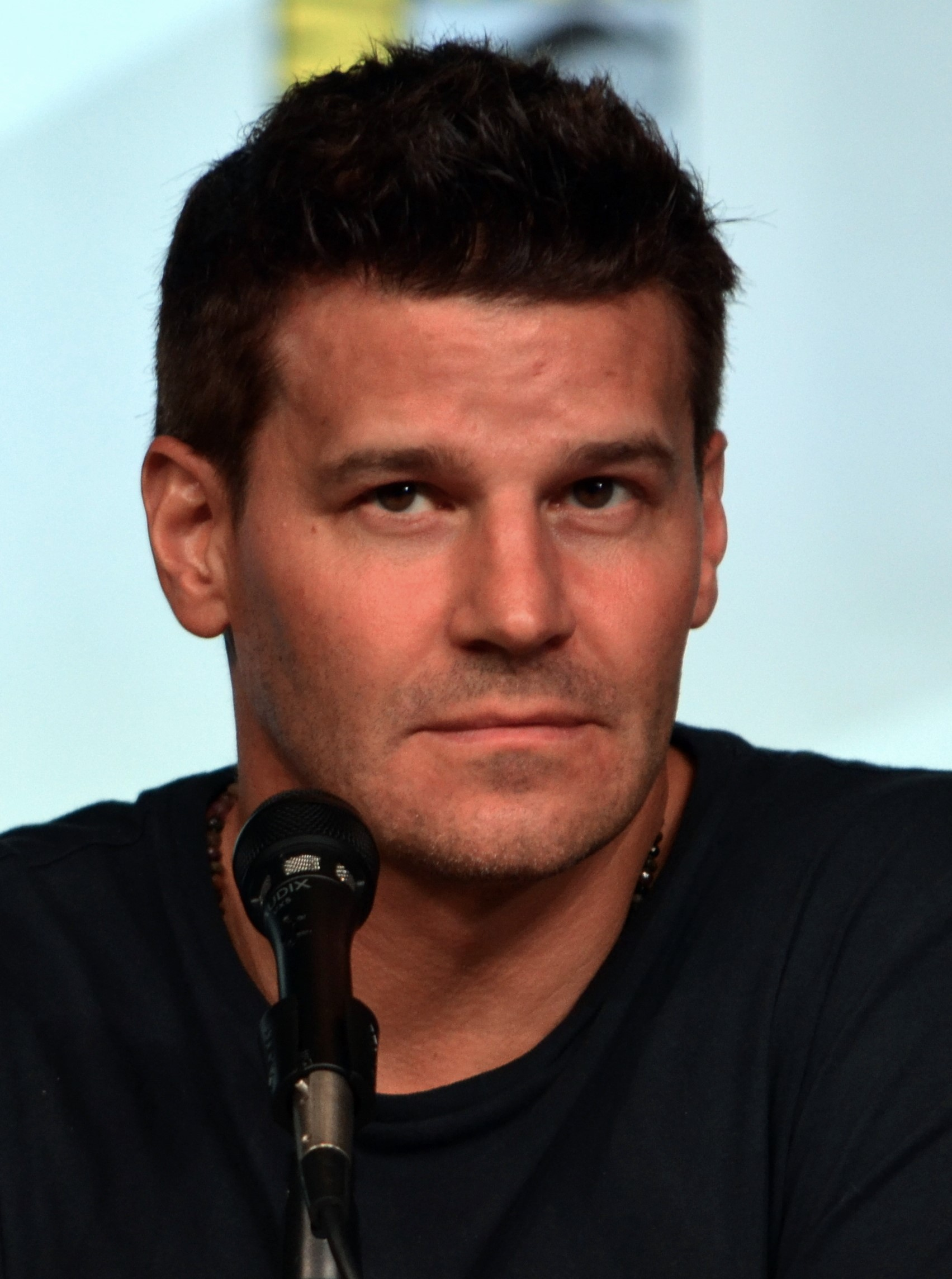
- David Boreanaz as Jason Hayes
- First appearance: "Tip of the Spear"; September 27, 2017
- Portrayed by: David Boreanaz

In-universe information
- Full name: Jason M. Hayes
- Title: Bravo 1/1B / 1IC
- Occupation: US Navy SEAL
- Affiliation: US Naval Special Warfare Development Group, Red Squadron, Bravo Team
- Family: David "Dave" Hayes (father); Linda Hayes (mother)
- Spouse: Alana Hayes† (late wife)
- Significant others: Amy Nelson (ex-lover); Dr. Natalie Pierce (ex-girlfriend); Amanda "Mandy" Ellis (girlfriend)
- Children: Emma Hayes (daughter); Michael "Mikey" Hayes (son)
- Relatives: Landon Massey (godson)
- Nationality: American

Military career
- Service: United States Navy
- Years of service: 1994–present
- Rank: Master Chief Special Warfare Operator

Master Chief Special Warfare Operator (E-9), Jason M. Hayes a.k.a. Bravo 1/1B, leader of a Navy SEAL team (Bravo Team), portrayed by David Boreanaz. In the series pilot, Jason is referred to as a Senior Chief Petty Officer. However, in the "Collapse" episode, he calls himself, "Master Chief." ^{A}

During Season 3, Jason mentions that he joined DEVGRU in June 2001, just a few months before 9/11, thinking he was going to be a "peacetime SEAL", and has spent his entire career fighting in the war on terror. It is also revealed that he has twelve deployments in Afghanistan. A later flashback during the events of Season 5's "Nine Ten" revealed that his original enlistment was up in November 2001 and he was considering returning to civilian life, potentially becoming an emergency medical technician (having enjoyed the Special Operations Combat Medic Course) while Alana could go back to school and pursue her dream of becoming a lawyer. Those plans were ultimately scuttled after the events of 9/11, and Jason served as the junior team member/door breacher of the DEVGRU Team that took out the first high-value target of the Operation Enduring Freedom – Afghanistan.

In the pilot, Jason is still dealing with the loss of one of his best friends and teammates, Nate Massey, who was killed the previous December; he has also separated from his wife, Alana, in the intervening months, with whom he has two children, Emma (then age 16) and Michael "Mikey" (then age 11). Although he and Alana attempt to reconcile, she ultimately asks him for a divorce just before his deployment to Jalalabad, Afghanistan in early 2018. Later that year, Alana dies following a car accident in season 2's "The Worst of Conditions". Jason takes a leave of absence from the Teams and even considers resigning in order to ensure that his children at least have one parent left (it was mentioned that Jason and Alana had frequently made plans should he be killed in action, but never even considered that she might be the parent who died first), but Emma convinces him to stay on Bravo Team.

In the aftermath of "Forever War", Jason decides to transfer off Bravo Team; as of "The New Normal", he is assigned as the N3 Operations Chief for DEVGRU while waiting for his enlistment to be up. Jason later changes his mind during "All In" and returns to Bravo Team at the start of "A Cover For Action."

In Season five, Jason starts suffering from traumatic brain injury (TBI). Clay immediately notices this in the episode "Conspicuous Gallantry" when he pieced together what went wrong after an op went sideways and landed the whole team in the hospital; Jason was the one responsible for the incident, but he does not tell anyone about it. Jason and Clay's relationship is estranged in "Head On" after Jason believed Clay was trying overthrow him as team leader, though Clay was only protecting Bravo Team from Jason's reckless actions. Jason finally admits to Clay and Ray (who Clay told about Jason bringing down the building on Bravo Team) that he knows that he has TBI. Ray takes Jason to see Marc Lee, a former Army Ranger for help whose treatment routine helps bring him some closure over deaths of men he served with as well as his regrets toward his relationship with Alana. In the next episode, Jason and Clay make peace with each other. After rescuing Mandy Ellis, who was being held in captivity by terrorist in Burkina Faso, Jason and Mandy begin having relations with one another initially keeping it a secret from the others. After a bit Jason admits his going with Mandy first Emma and then Ray who both are glad with the news believing Mandy's common history with Jason could give him at last a chance at a happy relationship.

In Season 6 "Low Impact" BRAVO team is ambushed en route to capture a HVP in Mali and in order to take out the enemy pinning the team down from high ground Jason makes a one-man assault on the enemy hilltop position successfully taking the position allowing BRAVO to defeat their attackers and be evacuated to safety. However, during the fight Clay is severely wounded eventually causing is right leg to be amputated. Much of the season Jason blames himself for Clay's injury believing if Clay hadn't been there to keep an eye on his TBI he would have been at home away from the fight with his family. In Episode 3 "Growing Pains" Omar Hamza is brought in to replace Clay on BRAVO team and Jason is uncertain if he can trust him with knowing about his TBI and rumors of Omar's sour relationship with his former team leader at FOXTROT, giving aggressively unwelcome throughout their time in Syria tracking down the Syrian militia leader Yasiri, which comes to a head when in "Thunderstruck" Omar and Jason have shot at taking Yasiri out and Jason calls off the attempt as symptoms of his TBI set in and Omar believing Jason called it because he didn't trust him. Jason eventually decides to trust him and admits his condition to Omar who tells there was no need to keep that a secret from him saying his condition is pretty common with most operators. In "Fair Winds and Following Seas" Jason is awarded the Navy Cross for his actions in Mali and still grieving the death of Clay he decides to come clean to the whole command on the spot about his TBI the following scene he is about to be relieved of duty and unfit to lead BRAVO team by the command staff when Ray and members of the teams walk in to admit their conditions in solidarity.

=== Clay Spenser ===
Clay Spenser
- SEAL Team character
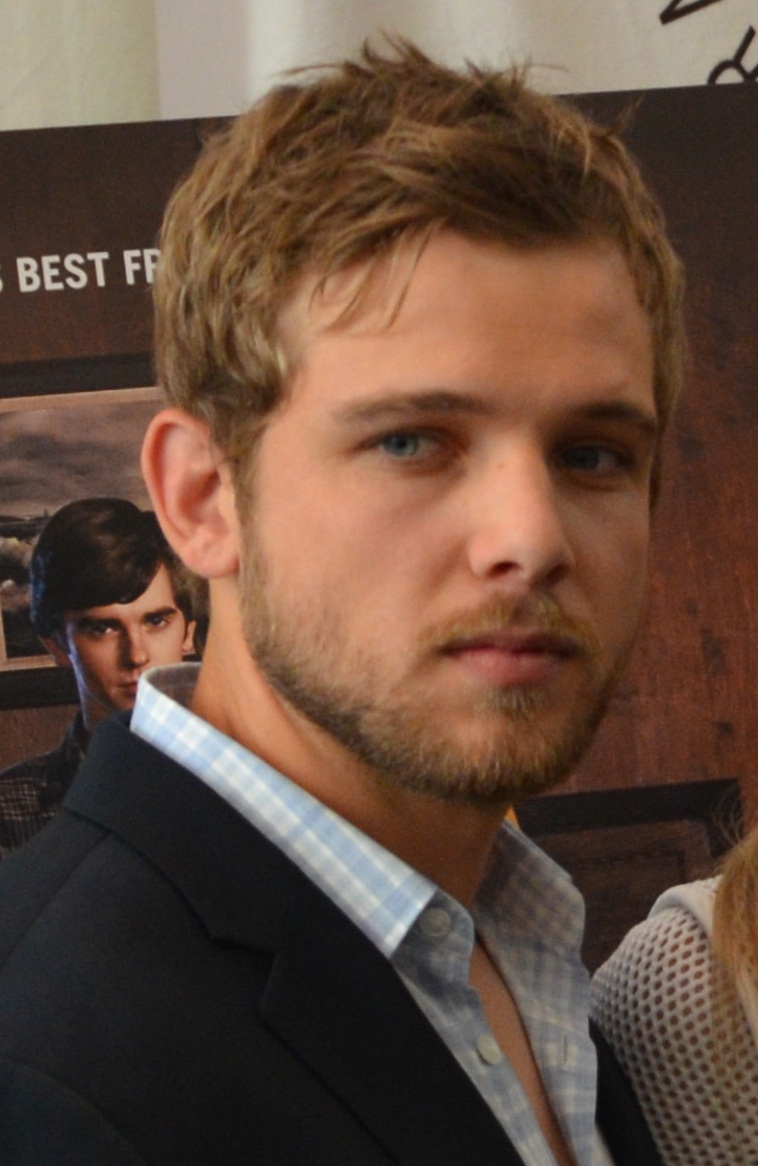
- Max Thieriot as Clay Spenser
- First appearance: "Tip of the Spear"; September 27, 2017
- Portrayed by: Max Thieriot

In-universe information
- Full name: Clay Spenser
- Title(s): Bravo 6/6B; Bravo 2/2B / 2IC (temporary); Chalk-2 / 2IC (prior the series)
- Occupation: US Navy SEAL
- Affiliation: Naval Special Warfare Group 1, SEAL Team 3, Alpha Platoon (prior the series); US Naval Special Warfare Development Group, Red Squadron, Bravo Team (former); US Naval Special Warfare Development Group, Green Team
- Family: Ash Spenser (father) unnamed mother (deceased)
- Spouse: Stella Baxter (wife)
- Significant other: Rebecca Bowen (ex-girlfriend)
- Children: Brian Spenser (son)
- Nationality: American

Military career
- Service: United States Navy
- Years of service: 2009–2022
- Rank: Special Warfare Operator First Class

Special Warfare Operator first Class (E-6) Clay Spenser a.k.a. Bravo 6/6B, a second-generation Navy SEAL. He's portrayed by Max Thieriot.

During the first part of season 1, he is a member of Green Team training for Tier One status, and his readiness for combat is questioned. His attitude changes after he loses his friend and fellow trainee Brian Armstrong during a parachuting training accident in the episode "Collapse". In “Other Lives” he meets Stella, a grad student and the two soon begin dating. He becomes a member of Bravo Team at the end of "The Exchange".

In season 2, he briefly served as the team's second-in-command following Senior Chief Ray Perry's assignment to Green Team. After being injured in "Paradise Lost", Clay returns home to the United States to recover, during which time he makes it his mission to ensure that a fellow Navy SEAL, now retired and suffering from traumatic brain injury, could receive a Purple Heart.

During the events of Season 3 – particularly after meeting Ambassador Marsden – Clay begins to wonder how he can "point the spear, not just be the tip" (i.e. have some say in what missions the SEALs, especially Bravo, are deployed). In "The Strength of the Wolf", Master Chief Hayes and Senior Chief Perry speculate that in 10 years, Clay will be leading Bravo Team. In "Rules of Engagement", CAPT Lindell volunteers to nominate Clay for STA-21, one of the Navy's officer-commissioning programs; after spending a few weeks thinking about it (and although the nomination does not go over well with Jason or especially Sonny), Clay decides to explore the option of possibly becoming an officer.

In season 4, after coming forward in "Forever War" admitting to writing a letter to Ambassador Marsden's husband that was given to the media after the State Department declared Marsden a rogue diplomat in order to cover up Ray's participation of the act, CAPT Lindell immediately revoked his STA-21 nomination and assigned him to a desk job in the Logistics Division - and in "The New Normal", Clay is told that he will be able to operate again in the near future, but it will not be with Bravo Team. Clay's suspension from Bravo was temporarily rescinded after Jason volunteers himself and Clay to join Bravo's rescue efforts to save Ray from enemy captivity. Shortly after the rescue mission, Clay's suspension from Bravo was removed on a permanent basis. He and Stella start dating again and they get married at the end of the fourth season.

In Season 6, Clay's right leg is amputated from the knee down after being seriously injured during a mission with Bravo in Mali. Clay decides to join Green Team as an instructor to teach recruits. After Clay struggles with recovery and his altered physical ability, serious depression leads him to take a leave of absence when his emotional turmoil causes him to run from Stella and their son Brian. After Sonny, Jason and the rest of his Bravo "brothers" help him through this struggle, Clay decides to spend some time at Ray and Naima's veteran outreach facility where he de-escalates a troubled former Air Force drone operator named Ben. As Clay spends time with Ben, his priorities shift and he ultimately decides that perhaps it is time to leave Green team for good and so he asks Stella what she would imagine for their future away from the teams. Clay decides that maybe it would healthier to move on with her entirely when he receives a phone call from a troubled Ben. Clay stops Ben from vandalizing the Air Force recruitment center that "tricked" him and ultimately from committing suicide. Just as Clay gets Ben to relinquish his firearm, a security guard shows up and surprises Clay and Ben. Seeing the gun in his hand, the guard shoots Clay through the heart killing him instantly.

Clay had four deployments in Afghanistan, two with Team 3 and two with DEVGRU Bravo Team.

=== Amanda Ellis ===
Officer Amanda Ellis is Bravo Team's CIA liaison. She's portrayed by Jessica Paré.

Because she gave the Indians the location of a wanted terrorist and CIA asset to save Ray in "My Life For Yours", Mandy is demoted from her rank of officer and is made a CIA interrogator. She rejoined Bravo around the time of their mission to Venezuela and after the conclusion of their deployment to Afghanistan in "Forever War", Mandy resigned from the CIA because of burnout. In Season 5 "Need to Know" Jason finds out Mandy was captured by SGS terrorists in Burkina Faso and in "Man on Fire" BRAVO locates and rescues her at a Gold mine belonging to a local warlord whose operation was captured by SGS terrorists. Mandy reveals to BRAVO that she had been contacted the warlord Sankara's sister, an asset she developed 10 years ago when Sankara threatened to kill his sister if she did not marry one of his soldiers and swear allegiance to his cause. Feeling the need to balance the scales for the lives she lost, Mandy reactivated her cover without CIA authorization and was disavowed. She managed to save Sankara's sister but was captured by SGS forces and in exchange for her life disclosed her knowledge of Sankara's trade routes for his operations making her more useful alive. After her rescue she and Jason start a relationship back home at first keeping things a secret but eventually opening up more as a couple. She takes a job working with an organization helping teachers out of Afghanistan. She comes back to the states when BRAVO team returns to help Jason mourning Clay's death, telling him that fact the two of them are willing to run through fire should be something bonds them.

=== Raymond "Ray" Perry ===
Raymond Perry
- SEAL Team character
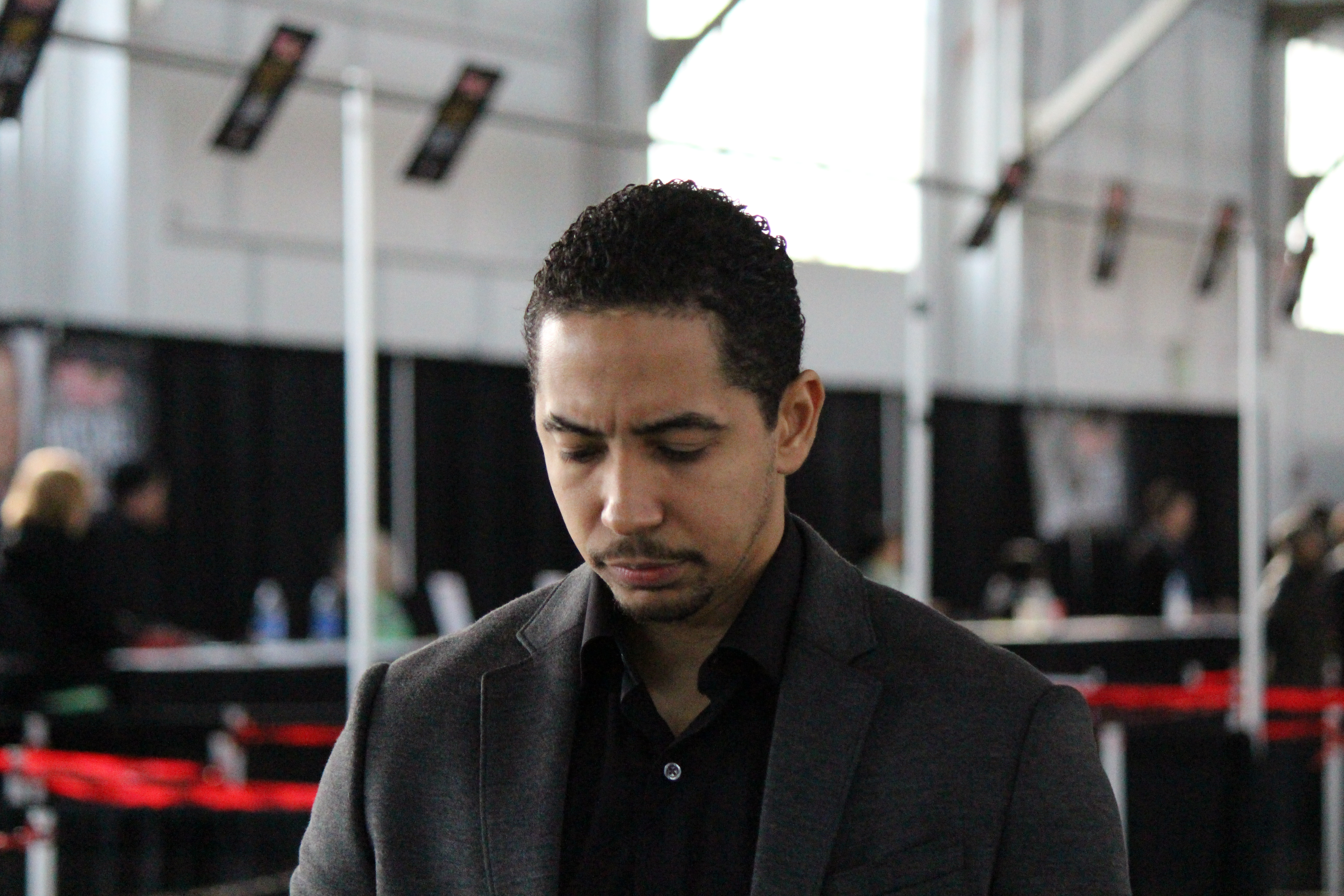
- Neil Brown Jr. as Raymond Perry
- First appearance: "Tip of the Spear"; September 27, 2017
- Portrayed by: Neil Brown Jr.

In-universe information
- Full name: Raymond Perry
- Nickname: Ray
- Title(s): Bravo 1/1B (temporary); Bravo 2/2B / 2IC (former); Mako 1/MK-1 / OIC (former); Head of Warfighter Health in DEVGRU
- Occupation: US Navy SEAL
- Affiliation: Naval Special Warfare Group 1, SEAL Team 3 US Naval Special Warfare Development Group, Green Team (season 2); US Naval Special Warfare Development Group, Red Squadron, Bravo Team (former)
- Family: Jamal Perry†; Diane Perry
- Spouse: Naima Perry (wife)
- Children: Jameelah Perry (daughter); Raymond Junior Perry (son)
- Nationality: American

Military career
- Service: United States Navy
- Years of service: 2003–present
- Rank: Chief Warrant Officer 2

Chief Warrant Officer 2 (W-2) (promoted from Senior Chief Special Warfare Operator (E-8)) Raymond "Ray" Perry a.k.a. Bravo 2/2B or Mako One/1 is Jason's most trusted friend and the longest tenured member of the team. He's portrayed by Neil Brown Jr.

During season 1, Ray lied about a shoulder injury due to the fear of losing the extra pay that came with deployment, which his family needed. When Jason learned about it during season 1's finale, Ray was reassigned to Green Team while he recovered. During season 2 premiere, set six months later, Jason rebuffed his attempts to return to Bravo, saying Ray had lost his trust. However, when Jason took a leave of absence in second season's episode "The Worst of Conditions", he requested Ray to return to Bravo.

During Season 3, Ray learns that he has been selected for promotion to Master Chief, but after some consideration (including for financial reasons as well as to remain with Bravo Team), Ray decides to put in for a warrant officer commission. Unknown to the rest of the team, Ray secretly wrote a letter defending Ambassador Marsden, only for Clay to take the blame on his own volition. In "Forever War", following their deployment to Afghanistan, Ray was notified that he would be spending the next two months in Newport, Rhode Island at Chief Warrant Officer School, and in "The New Normal", he returns to Bravo Team with his new rank.

Ray is married to Naima, and they have a daughter, Jameelah, and a son, Raymond Junior. The family experiences financial difficulties during season 1 and 2. It was later revealed in "Nine Ten" that Ray had gotten injured in high school, resulting in the loss of his wrestling scholarship and leaving him somewhat aimless. On September 10, he was arrested but his father, Jamal, a Captain with the New York City Fire Department, was able to call in a favor and got the charges dropped. The next day, Jamal was one of the 343 firefighters who was killed in the September 11 attacks. These events exacerbated his aimlessness. As a result, it took him two more years to "get his life together and enlist."

=== Sonny Quinn ===
Sonny Quinn
- SEAL Team character
- First appearance: "Tip of the Spear"; September 27, 2017
- Portrayed by: A. J. Buckley

In-universe information
- Full name: Percival Quinn
- Title: Bravo 3/3B (former)
- Occupation: US Navy SEAL
- Affiliation: Naval Special Warfare Group 2, SEAL Team 4 US Naval Special Warfare Development Group, Red Squadron, Bravo Team (former)
- Family: Emmet Quinn (father); Eileen Quinn (mother)†
- Significant others: Lisa Davis (girlfriend); Hannah Oliver (estranged girlfriend)
- Children: Leanne Deirdre Oliver (daughter, w/ Hannah Oliver)
- Relatives: three unnamed sisters
- Nationality: American

Military career
- Service: United States Navy
- Years of service: 2001–2022
- Rank: Chief Special Warfare Operator

Chief Special Warfare Operator (E-7) Percival "Sonny" Quinn a.k.a. Bravo 3/3B, a loyal but sometimes volatile SEAL from Texas who is at his best in firefights and prefers them over a leadership position. He's portrayed by A. J. Buckley.

Since season 2, Sonny is involved in a secret relationship with Lisa Davis, which goes against the fraternization rules, until she breaks up with him in season 3's episode "The Strength of the Wolf". During the events of season 4, Sonny and Davis re-explore their chances of a relationship when they both agree to take different career paths outside of Bravo Team.

In "Rules of Engagement", Sonny gets into a scuffle with a patron in a Washington, D.C. bar who was falsely claiming to be a Navy SEAL. In "Last Known Location", CAPT Lindell, who had heard about the altercation through channels, temporarily reassigned Sonny to Laughlin Air Force Base for six weeks of advanced armory school, during which time he reconnected with his estranged father and his old high school best friend, Hannah Oliver (Rachel Boston). After completing his "punishment", Sonny returned to Bravo Team in Jalalabad in "No Choice in Duty". During the events of season 4, it is later revealed that Sonny fathered a daughter during his brief tryst with Hannah.

As revealed in "Nine Ten", Sonny, who had previously been crashing in Hannah's dorm room during her freshman year of college, enlisted in the Navy two days after 9/11.

=== Lisa Davis ===
Lisa Davis
- SEAL Team character
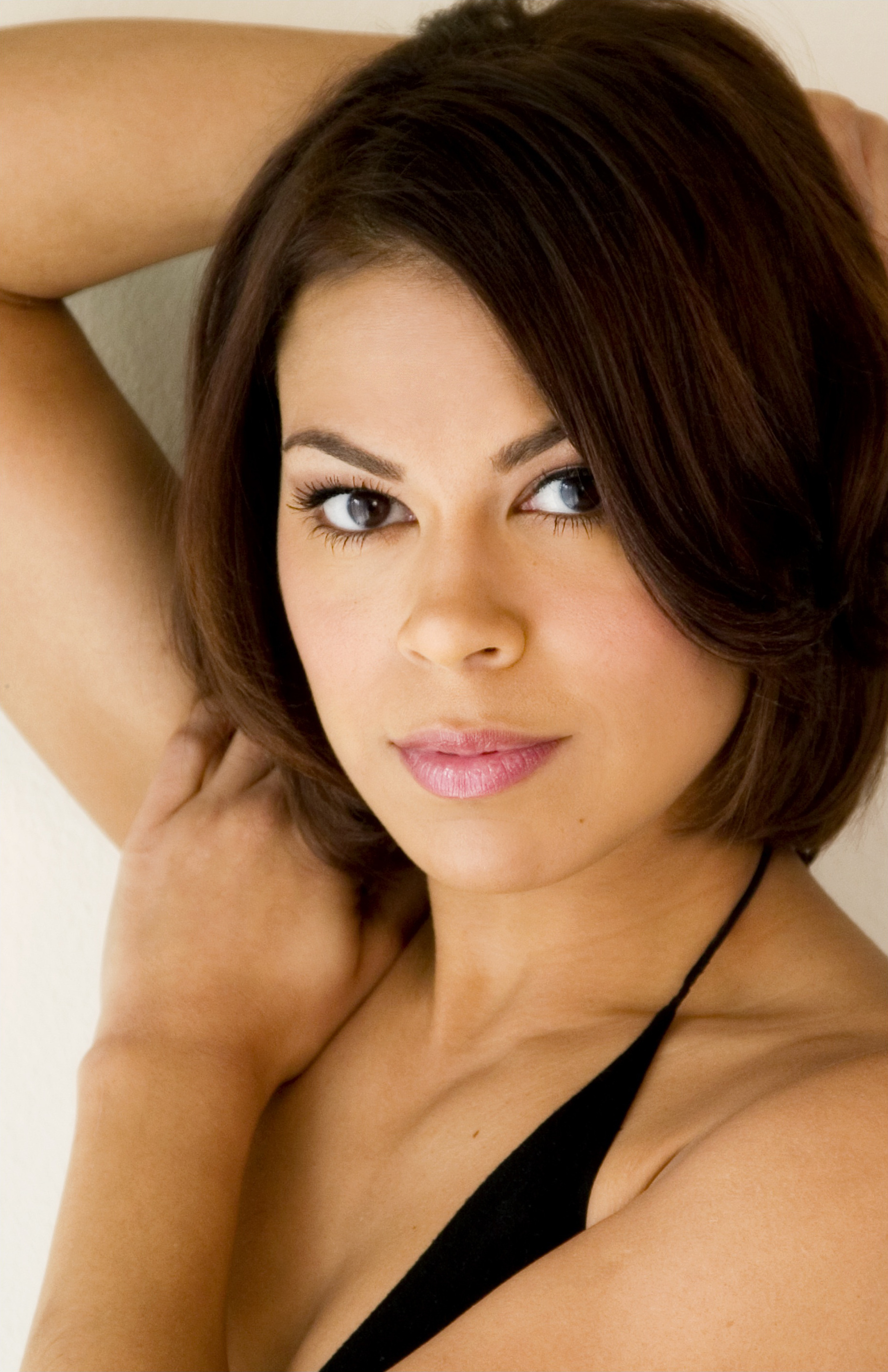
- Toni Trucks as Lisa Davis
- First appearance: "Tip of the Spear"; September 27, 2017
- Portrayed by: Toni Trucks

In-universe information
- Full name: Lisa Davis
- Title: LT Davis
- Occupation: SOCOM liaison in DEVGRU
- Affiliation: SEAL Team 4, Logistics Specialist (former); US Naval Special Warfare Development Group, Red Squadron, Bravo Team (former); United States Special Operations Command
- Family: unnamed father unnamed mother
- Significant others: Sonny Quinn (boyfriend); Danny Cooper (ex-boyfriend)
- Relatives: Ronnie Davis (sister); Michelle Davis† (sister)
- Nationality: American

Military career
- Service: United States Navy
- Years of service: 2011–present
- Rank: Lieutenant

Lieutenant (formerly Logistics Specialist First Class) Lisa Davis, assigned to Bravo Team. Earlier in her career, she was a Yeoman. In Season 2, after eight years in the Navy, she is accepted into Officer Candidate School and receives her commission upon graduation in "Rock Bottom". As of "Welcome to the Refuge", ENS Davis serves as a DEVGRU Intelligence Officer assigned primarily to Bravo Team, after accepting LCDR Blackburn's offer. In "The New Normal", ENS Davis is notified by CAPT Lindell that she is in line for a promotion. In "Rearview Mirror", Davis is seen wearing the rank of Lieutenant Junior Grade. Prior to season 7, Davis is promoted to Lieutenant. She's portrayed by Toni Trucks.

Her past is explained in season 2's episode "Rock Bottom". When she was 11 years-old, Lisa's house burned. She tried to save her two sisters, Ronnie and Michelle, but could not reach the latter and had to take the decision to save Ronnie only. Her mother blamed her for Michelle's death because she was not about to blame herself. Ronnie still resents her for it and they are estranged as a result.

In season 1, Lisa dated former SEAL Danny Cooper, until he fell back into his drug addiction. During season 2, she started a relationship with Sonny Quinn, which was against the fraternization rules. She broke things off with him in season 3's episode "The Strength of the Wolf”. Her relationship with Sonny would continue to be complex in that the two of them still mutually harbor feelings for one another, but never able to move forward with it due to their professional relationship with them remaining friends.

=== Eric Blackburn ===
Eric Blackburn
- SEAL Team character
- First appearance: "Tip of the Spear"; September 27, 2017
- Portrayed by: Judd Lormand

In-universe information
- Full name: Eric Blackburn
- Title: Havoc
- Occupation: Executive Officer, DEVGRU
- Affiliation: US Naval Special Warfare Development Group, Red Squadron, Bravo Team (former)
- Nationality: American

Military career
- Service: United States Navy
- Years of service: 1999–Present
- Rank: Commander

Commander Eric Blackburn is Bravo Team's commanding officer (recurring season 1; main seasons 2–4). He is portrayed by Judd Lormand.

In Season 4, LCDR Blackburn is promoted to Commander and named the new Executive Officer of DEVGRU, leaving Bravo Team.

=== Omar Hamza ===
Omar Hamza
- SEAL Team character
- First appearance: "Growing Pains"; October 2, 2022
- Portrayed by: Raffi Barsoumian

In-universe information
- Full name: Omar Hamza
- Title(s): Bravo 2/2B / 2IC; Foxtrot 2/2F / 2IC (former)
- Occupation: US Navy SEAL
- Affiliation: Naval Special Warfare Group 1, SEAL Team 5 US Naval Special Warfare Development Group, Red Squadron, Foxtrot Team (former), Bravo Team
- Family: unnamed father unnamed mother
- Spouse: Nicky Hamza (ex-wife)
- Children: Muhammad "Mo" Hamza
- Nationality: American

Military career
- Service: United States Navy
- Years of service: 2004–present
- Rank: Senior Chief Special Warfare Operator

Senior Chief Special Warfare Operator (E-8) Omar Hamza was transferred to Bravo Team from Foxtrot Team when it was decommissioned. He is portrayed by Raffi Barsoumian

The son of Syrian immigrants, Omar has over fifteen years of experience in the SEALs.

=== Drew Franklin ===
Drew Franklin
- SEAL Team character
- First appearance: "Chaos in the Calm Pt. 1"; August 11, 2024
- Portrayed by: Beau Knapp

In-universe information
- Full name: Laurance A. Franklin IV
- Title(s): Bravo 5/5B; Bravo 6/6B (former); Echo 6/6E (former)
- Occupation: US Navy SEAL
- Affiliation: US Naval Special Warfare Development Group, Red Squadron, Echo Team (former), Bravo Team
- Family: unnamed father unnamed mother
- Relatives: Nora Franklin (sister)
- Nationality: American

Military career
- Service: United States Navy
- Years of service: 2008–Present
- Rank: Special Warfare Operator First Class

Special Warfare Operator First Class (E-6) Laurance A. "Drew" Franklin IV a.k.a. Bravo 6/6B, is the newest member of Bravo who joins their mission in Sweden and then becomes assigned full time with the Team in "Ships in the Night". He is not just a rookie or a newbie, though, since Sonny describes him as an "urban legend" due to his mysterious past as a tier-one operator. He's portrayed by Beau Knapp.

It is revealed in "A Perfect Storm" that Drew was a member of Echo Team, but was not with the team when they were ambushed during their deployment to Afghanistan in early 2018. The deaths of his former teammates have alienated Drew from other members of DevGru, earning him the reputation of the Lone Wolf. However, this changes once he becomes a member of Bravo Team, especially due to the insistence of Omar and Sonny, who want Drew to share with the team what happened in his life.

^{A}Enlisted SEALs have Special Warfare Operator specific ratings. See US Navy SEAL ratings.

== Recurring characters ==
=== Bravo Team ===
==== Trent Sawyer ====
Trent Sawyer
- SEAL Team character
- First appearance: "Tip of the Spear"; September 27, 2017
- Portrayed by: Tyler Grey

In-universe information
- Full name: Trent Sawyer
- Title: Bravo 4/4B
- Occupation: US Navy SEAL
- Affiliation: US Naval Special Warfare Development Group, Red Squadron, Bravo Team
- Family: unnamed father unnamed mother
- Spouse: three unnamed ex-wives
- Nationality: American

Military career
- Service: United States Navy
- Years of service: 2001–Present
- Rank: Special Warfare Operator First Class

Special Warfare Operator First Class (E-6) Trent Sawyer a.k.a. Bravo 4/4B a member of Bravo Team who serves as the Lead Corpsman. He's portrayed by Tyler Grey. Grey is a former Army Sergeant First Class, having served in Iraq as a member of 2nd Battalion, 75th Ranger Regiment, then in Afghanistan and Iraq again as a member of A Squadron, 1st Special Forces Operational Detachment-Delta. It was there he was hit with an IED, leaving him with the right arm that is seen in the show whenever he wears short sleeves.

In Season 5, Trent goes on medical leave, potentially for a year or more, in order to heal from nearly 20 years worth of war and special operations.

==== Brock Reynolds ====
Brock Reynolds a.k.a. Bravo 5/5B is a Special Warfare Operator First Class (E-6), a member of Bravo Team and handler of the team's canine, Cerberus. He is portrayed by Justin Melnick. Melnick was a K9 police officer in Daleville, Indiana and originally hired purely as the show's canine handler but was told he "looked like a SEAL" and appeared in the pilot episode as an extra, which became a co-starring role.

==== Cerberus ====
Cerberus is Bravo Team's canine, portrayed by Dita the Hair Missile. Dita is a seven-year-old, female KNPV-line Belgian Malinois and is a cousin of the dog who played Bear on Person of Interest.

After the conclusion of their deployment to Afghanistan in "Forever War" (during which Cerberus was injured), Brock and the team decided it was time for him to retire. As of "The New Normal", Cerberus is living with Jason as his personal dog.

==== Adam Seaver ====
Master Chief Special Warfare Operator Adam Seaver is the Chief instructor of the Green Team SEALs. He is portrayed by Michael Irby.

In season 2 episode 3, "The Worst of Conditions", Adam takes over as Team Leader of Bravo Team during Master Chief Jason Hayes' leave of absence. He is killed in the line of duty in "Say Again Your Last", the fifth episode of season 2.

==== Summer Kairos ====
Summer Kairos, portrayed by Ruffin Prentiss, is a Navy Explosive Ordnance Disposal technician assigned to Bravo Team during season 2.

==== Scott Carter ====
Senior Chief Special Warfare Operator Scott "Full Metal" Carter is former team leader in Alpha, who joins Bravo Team after Clay is injured in an explosion in season 2's episode 17, "Paradise Lost". Since mid-season 2, Carter serves as support personnel in Bravo Team. Metal dies in the final episode of the fourth season and is buried at sea. He is portrayed by Scott Foxx, who also serves as one of the show's military advisors. Foxx is a nine-tour SEAL veteran in real life. He retired at the rank of Senior Chief Special Warfare Operator with a Navy Cross, two Bronze Stars with Valor device, and a Purple Heart.

==== Victor Lopez ====
Victor "Vic" Lopez is a Special Warfare Operator First Class, portrayed by Lucca De Oliveira. In season 3, he is the newest member of Bravo Team (Bravo 7/7B) until he is removed from Bravo Team and the SEAL community during the events of "Fog of War" for lying about the accidental killing of a hostage the team was rescuing.

==== Michael Chen ====
Chief Special Warfare Operator Michael "Thirty Mike" Chen a.k.a. Charlie 2/2C, portrayed by Tim Chiou. Chen is a member of Charlie Team who is provisionally replacing Sonny in Bravo Team during the first half of deployment in Afghanistan. It is also revealed that he was previously a member of Bravo Team, prior to Jason becoming team leader, serving alongside Jason and Ray when they were Bravo 3/3B and Bravo 6/6B, respectively. As of "The New Normal", Thirty Mike is the interim Bravo 1/Team Leader until Command can assign a permanent replacement for Master Chief Hayes.

=== Family and friends ===
==== Stella Baxter ====
Stella Baxter is Clay's wife. She is portrayed by Alona Tal.

She is introduced in season 1 episode 2, "Other Lives", where she meets and flirts with Clay in a bar, they start dating shortly after. They break up in season 2 episode 6, "Hold What You Got", when she could no longer deal with the stress of dating a SEAL. She is then reintroduced in season 2 episode 21, "My Life for Yours". They break up again but get back together in season 4 episode 7 "All In" and get married in the season 4 finale.

==== Alana Hayes ====
Alana Hayes (seasons 1–2) is Jason's estranged wife, portrayed by Michaela McManus. She dies following a car accident in the second-season episode "The Worst of Conditions", leaving Jason and their children devastated.

==== Emma Hayes ====
Emma Hayes, Jason and Alana's daughter, portrayed by Kerri Medders.

At the end of season 2, she graduates from high school and moves to New York where she is enrolled in college at New York University Tisch School of the Arts.

In Season 6 she becomes engaged to a Navy recruit named Brad who would also be trying out for the SEAL teams, with Jason worrying that it could just be repeating the cycle he and Alana went through. Her wedding takes place at the climax of the Season 7 Series Finale "The Last Word."

==== Michael "Mikey" Hayes ====
Michael Hayes is Jason and Alana's son, portrayed by Ammon Jacob Ford. Starting in season 2, he begins to attend boarding school. In season 5, Gavin White takes over playing Mikey Hayes.

==== Linda Hayes ====
Linda is Jason's mother, who comes to help him after Alana dies in season 2. She is portrayed by Wendy Phillips.

==== Naima Perry ====
Naima Perry is Ray's Kurdish wife and mother of his children, Jameelah and Raymond Jr. Naima, a nurse, is the one who takes care of the family's finances. She's portrayed by Parisa Fakhri.

==== Ash Spenser ====
Ash Spenser is Clay's father and a retired Senior Chief Special Warfare Operator who wrote a tell-it-all book. He's portrayed by C. Thomas Howell.

He was a SEAL for 15 years and a member of the Tier One SEAL unit formerly known as SEAL Team Six, where he served alongside future Green Team Master Chief Adam Seaver. He currently owns a firearms training company and a security consulting company and appears often in the media as a tactics and security expert. In the Season 5 episode "Nine Ten", it is revealed that Ash retired from the Navy on September 10, having served in Panama as part of Operation Nifty Package, the Gulf War, and Operation Gothic Serpent in Somalia, and that immediately after the attacks he started serving as a media consultant on tactics and security.

In season 1, he has an estranged relationship with his son, mainly for abandoning him when he was five years old. Their estrangement is made worse, due to him having written a book about his time operating, which made him a traitor in the eyes of other SEALs.

In the later part of Season 2 and early part of Season 3, Clay convinces Ash to use his notoriety to champion the cause of awarding Purple Hearts to veterans with post-traumatic stress syndrome and traumatic brain injuries.

== Other characters ==
=== Season 1 ===
- Steve Howey as Danny Cooper, a former member of SEAL Team 4 and Sonny's ex-teammate, medically retired after a bomb-related injury. He and LS1 Lisa Davis had a romantic relationship in season 1.
- Sharif Atkins as Senior Chief Special Warfare Operator Beau Fuller, the leader of Charlie Team. He and Jason came up the ranks together and have a longtime rivalry.
- Daniel Briggs as Chief Special Warfare Operator Derek Young, the Alpha Team second-in-command.
- Darren Pettie as Paul Mulwray, a reporter in Afghanistan and son of the Secretary of Defense.
- Dawn Olivieri as Amy Nelson, a private security specialist working on the Afghanistan base.
- Jonathan Cake as Alan Cutter, the CEO of Xeon Tactical Security, a private security firm working on the Afghanistan base, former British Special Air Service officer and Amy Nelson's boss.
- David DeSantos as Tim Belding, Mandy's CIA boss in Afghanistan.
- Marsha Thomason as Staff Sergeant Vanessa Ryan, a cultural support team soldier who works with the Bravo Team in Afghanistan.
- Nitya Vidyasagar as Meera Nelson

=== Season 2 ===
- Mirelly Taylor as Rita Alfaro, a CISEN agent serving as Mandy's liaison for the team's operations in Mexico.
- Felix Solis as Colonel Martinez, a Mexican Naval Infantry Corps colonel who conducts joint operations with Bravo Team in Mexico. Martinez is mortally wounded and dies in the Season 2 episode "Santa Muerte".
- Bobby Daniel Rodriguez as Lieutenant Lopez, a hot-blooded Mexican Naval Infantry Corps lieutenant who is part of the Mexican joint strike force with Bravo Team.
- Tony Curran as Senior Chief Special Warfare Operator Brett Swann, a retired veteran SEAL who formerly served with Bravo Team. He kills himself in "Medicate and Isolate" as a result of the V.A. doctors being unable to treat his Traumatic Brain Injury.
- Michael McGrady as Captain Harrington, the Commanding Officer of SEAL Team Six.
- Samantha Sloyan as Victoria Seaver, Adam's wife and later widow.
- Breana Raquel as Hannah Seaver, Adam and Victoria's daughter and Emma's friend.
- Tamala Jones as Gunnery Sergeant Miller

=== Season 3 ===
- Jamie McShane as Captain Grayson Lindell, the new Commanding Officer of SEAL Team Six. As part of his new command, he brings in physiologist Dr. Natalie Pierce, approaches Master Chief Hayes about considering becoming an operations chief, believing that his career as an operator is winding down but not wanting to waste such a valuable resource, and sponsors SO2 Spenser for STA-21.
- Emily Swallow as Dr. Natalie Pierce, a physiologist brought in by Captain Lindell in order to study and hopefully improve the physical health and longevity of the SEALs. She became close to Jason during his times in recovery, the two begin a relationship in "Kill or Cure". In "Forever War", it's revealed that CAPT Lindell put her up for the Navy Meritorious Civilian Service Award after a paper she wrote was published. In "All In", Natalie is in the process of transferring to San Diego, but Jason breaks up with her to remain with Bravo Team.
- Adelaide Kane as Rebecca Bowen, Clay's new girlfriend who worked for Ambassador Marsden and is now a mover-and-shaker in Washington, D.C. The two broke up after Clay was reprimanded for writing a letter to Ambassador Marsden's husband that was leaked to the press.

=== Season 6 ===
- Noor Razooky as Yezda
