= The Mighty Macs =

- Theatrical release poster
- Directed by: Tim Chambers
- Screenplay by: Tim Chambers; Whitney Springer
- Story by: Anthony Gargano
- Produced by: Tim Chambers
- Starring: Carla Gugino; Ellen Burstyn; Marley Shelton; David Boreanaz
- Edited by: M. Scott Smith
- Music by: William Ross
- Distributed by: Freestyle Releasing
- Release dates: October 17, 2009 (Heartland); October 21, 2011 (United States)
- Running time: 99 minutes
- Country: United States
- Language: English
- Budget: $7 million
- Box office: $1.8 million

The Mighty Macs is a 2009 American sports drama film by director Tim Chambers. It stars Carla Gugino in the lead role of Cathy Rush, a Hall of Fame women's basketball coach. The film premiered in the 2009 Heartland Film Festival and was released theatrically in the United States on October 21, 2011, through indie film label Freestyle Releasing.

== Plot ==
In 1971, Cathy Rush, a woman ahead of her time, takes a job as the head women's basketball coach at Immaculata College. Rush faces a challenge of trying to compete against perennial powerhouses. When she assumes her position as coach, the school has no court, no uniforms, and no support for a basketball team. In addition, the school is in serious danger of closing. With Ellen Burstyn as the college president/mother superior, the team and its new coach seem doomed. However, Rush, who is simultaneously dealing with issues in her marriage, is dogged in her determination to succeed and so to enable the team to succeed.

== Cast ==
- Carla Gugino as Cathy Rush
- Ellen Burstyn as Mother St. John
- Marley Shelton as Sister Sunday
- David Boreanaz as Ed Rush
- Katie Hayek as Trish Sharkey
- Kim Blair as Lizanne Caufield
- Margaret Anne Florence as Rosemary Keenan
- Taylor Steel as Mimi Malone
- Kate Nowlin as Colleen McCann
- Meghan Sabia as Jen Galentino
- Phyllis Somerville as Sister Sister
- Tony Luke, Jr. as Salvator Galentino
- Lauren Bittner as Mary Margaret O'Malley
- Kathy Romano as Gate Agent
- Joe Conklin as Game Announcer

== Production ==
The film was filmed in 2007, but not released until 2011 due to the difficulties of finding a distributor. The director, Tim Chambers, had a potential distribution deal with Disney, but turned it down because Disney wanted to add coarse language to earn a PG rating, but Chambers preferred to go for a G rating. Chambers worked out a deal with Freestyle Releasing, and the movie opened four years after completing the filming.

Some scenes were shot at West Chester University in West Chester, Pennsylvania.

Some scenes were shot at The Hill School in Pottstown, Pennsylvania.

Some scenes were shot in Alfred Cope Hall Gymnasium at Cheyney University in Cheyney, Pennsylvania.

== Reception ==
The Mighty Macs received mixed reviews from critics. On Rotten Tomatoes, the film holds a rating of 46%, based on 50 reviews, with an average rating of 5.4/10. The site's consensus reads, "Its heart is obviously in the right place, but The Mighty Macs is too blandly formulaic to transcend the genre's many clichés." On Metacritic, the film has a rating of 49 out of 100, based on 19 critics, indicating "mixed or average reviews".

== See also ==
- List of basketball films
