= Jim Rockford =

Fictional character on the television series The Rockford Files

James Scott Rockford
- First appearance: "The Rockford Files" (TV pilot), retitled for syndication as "Backlash of the Hunter"
- Last appearance: If It Bleeds... It Leads (TV movie)
- Created by: Stephen J. Cannell
- Portrayed by: James Garner (1972); David Boreanaz (2027)

In-universe information
- Aliases: Many, including "Jim Taggart" and "Jimmy Joe Meeker" (two used most often).
- Gender: Male
- Occupation: Private Investigator
- Family: Joseph "Rocky" Rockford (father); Unnamed mother

James Scott Rockford is a fictional character on the television series The Rockford Files. The character, played by James Garner, is a struggling private investigator operating in the greater Los Angeles area (although his cases very occasionally take him farther afield). Rockford is the principal character of the series, and Garner was the only actor to appear in every episode of the series.

== Character background and investigation agency ==
Unlike many other fictional "private eyes", Rockford is an ex-convict from San Quentin, albeit one who was falsely convicted and later fully pardoned. One episode tells that because of the carelessness of his parole officer, Rockford had to hire an attorney to be free of parole requirements. Although he was innocent of the charge of armed robbery for which he was imprisoned, in several episodes it is suggested that Rockford had at one time been a mostly successful con artist. (Speaking of his propensity for bending the law, Rockford himself notes: "On my best day, I'm borderline.") Except when being specifically threatened by hoods he gets along amicably with them, better than he does with high ranking police officers, who almost without exception dislike him.

Rockford operates a small private investigation service out of his small beachside mobile home in Malibu, California. The trailer was parked in the lot for Paradise Cove next to a restaurant. To avoid possible confrontations with the police, he will not take on open police cases. He also refuses to do domestic cases. He specializes instead in cold cases, missing person cases and small-time insurance scams. At one time, in addition to other clients, he worked on a retainer basis for a major insurance company, but the company scrapped the deal when a case went sour, and Rockford lost the annual income. He charges a flat rate of $200 a day plus expenses for each case, which, in a running gag, he seldom actually receives. Over the years he was involved in several cases for which his investigative efforts should have gained him significant bonuses or rewards, but he was never able to collect them. He is consistently shown to be short on money, or trying to keep creditors at bay; he typically wears sport coats and low-priced off-the-rack suits and his lone indulgences are an answering machine (uncommon at the time and the source of another running gag at the beginning of each episode) and the latest gold colored Pontiac Firebird Esprit automobile, traded in each year of the series for the newest model. (Garner did not like the appearance and handling of the restyled 1979 Firebird, so the 1978 model was reused for the final season in 1979–80; this was an apparent use of product placement in the series.) Rockford is an outstanding driver; on several occasions when being followed or otherwise threatened by another vehicle, he gets out of tricky situations with professional-level stunt maneuvers. His signature move, a sudden unexpected J-turn, became so identified with the character it is also sometimes now called a "Rockford turn".

Rockford’s investigative style is to use his wits and a good measure of deception to get useful information from those he interviews. In one episode he is derisively described by a rival private investigator as “the con bull artist”. In addition to posing as insurance investigators and government officials (frequently using the pseudonym "Jim Taggart"), he sometimes invents preposterous characters and scenarios to confuse people, which usually gets them to reveal some valuable information. He has a portable printing press kept in his car and uses it to prepare appropriate false business cards that lend credibility to his various guises. He is adept at using a lockpick.

Rockford's contact inside the Los Angeles Police Department is his friend, sergeant (later, lieutenant) Dennis Becker, who often will, albeit grudgingly, run car license plates and do criminal record checks for him. In return, Rockford gives Becker information on criminal activity he may uncover, allowing Becker to receive credit for any arrests that may follow.

Rockford shared many personality traits with the lead characters of two of Garner's previous series, Maverick's Bret Maverick and Nichols's Frank Nichols. Rockford was usually unarmed (he occasionally carried an unlicensed pistol – which he kept in a cookie jar in his home – but hardly ever used it) and, despite trying to avoid trouble and use reason and negotiation to solve problems, would sometimes be pressed into a fistfight as a last resort.

=== Military service ===
During the series, it is also revealed that Rockford was wounded in action and awarded a Silver Star while serving in the Korean War with the 24th Infantry Division. After being busted to private, he was promoted to sergeant for conning the North Koreans into exchanging a tank for 400 cases of K rations so that his encircled unit could escape; however, he was soon busted back to private when it was discovered that he was running a string of pool halls in Busan and had stolen a major general's car. He also forgot to return his service pistol, which results in him getting a call from the army about it 23 years later. A running gag is that, whenever Rockford gets involved with cases connected to members of his old division, he is usually in trouble. (The reference to the 24th Division is an inside reference to James Garner's real-life service; Garner actually served in the 5th Infantry Regiment (United States) of the 24th Infantry Division, a.k.a. "Taro Division" during the Korean War.)

=== Personal life ===
Jim Rockford maintains a close relationship with his father Joseph "Rocky" Rockford (Noah Beery Jr.), and his closest friend is LAPD Sgt. (later Lt.) Dennis Becker (who also serves as his LAPD contact), played by Joe Santos. He remains in contact with a number of ex-cons whom he met in San Quentin, most prominently Evelyn "Angel" Martin (Stuart Margolin), who provides comic relief in many episodes; a running gag is that Angel's hare-brained schemes and con jobs invariably land Jim in some kind of trouble, often without his knowledge.

There are only a very few fleeting and oblique references to Jim's mother, who it is implied died when Jim was young. Rocky, a retired trucker, did not remarry. Though Rocky is clearly proud of Jim, in Rocky's way, he persistently badgers Jim to find a safer, more reliably paying line of work – like trucking.

Jim enjoys fishing and would rather spend time doing that than almost anything else. He is a fan of the Los Angeles Lakers, but when he makes plans to attend a game, something usually occurs that prevents it and he has to give away his tickets. His musical tastes run to classic jazz (he has tapes of Ella Fitzgerald and Count Basie), though he also appears to appreciate country music, having attended and enjoyed a Barbara Mandrell concert. Jim is frequently seen eating Mexican food, usually tacos and sometimes has them for breakfast. During the run of the original series, Jim lives in and works out of a single wide mobile home on the beach at Paradise Cove, Malibu; though its exterior is decidedly ramshackle and something of an eyesore, inside it is relatively comfortable and homey. In the Rockford Files TV movies filmed and set in the 1990s, Jim still lives in the same location, but owns a newer and much larger trailer that is considerably nicer (especially from the outside) and more well-appointed compared to his trailer of the 1970s.

Though Jim is generally reluctant to engage in potentially dangerous situations and often describes himself as "chicken", when there is a need to act heroically, his actions often speak otherwise. When he has no choice but to fight physically, Rockford will use whatever tactics necessary, but he's just as liable to lose as to win.

Jim dated many women during the course of The Rockford Files, with most relationships not appearing to last longer than a single episode, although there were a few exceptions. The most notable was the on/off relationship with his lawyer, Beth Davenport (Gretchen Corbett), during her appearance on the show (1974 through 1978). Later in the show's run, during 1978 and 1979, Rockford had an open but still serious relationship with psychiatrist Megan Dougherty (Kathryn Harrold); Rockford was quietly devastated when she announced that she was marrying someone else.

At some time between the end of the series proper (1980) and the first of the Rockford Files television-movies, "The Rockford Files: I Still Love L.A." (filmed in 1994, but set in 1992 and 1993), Jim married attorney Halley "Kit" Kittredge (Joanna Cassidy), who appeared in this TV movie. In a conversation about their relationship, Kit alludes to the idea that the marriage ended because both Jim and Kit were very independent and stubborn people. In later TV movies, it is established that they were a couple by 1985 at the latest, and that Kit left the marriage in 1987. However, it is unknown when they were married, or for exactly how long. They had no children.

== Reception ==
In 1999, TV Guide ranked him # 25 on its 50 Greatest TV Characters of All Time list. AOL TV named him one of TV's Smartest Detectives.

== In other media ==
The detective story writer Stuart M. Kaminsky has written two books with Jim Rockford as the main character, entitled The Green Bottle and The Devil on My Doorstep.

In "Ruskie Business", an episode of the television series Veronica Mars, Logan Echolls calls the titular character "Rockford", referencing Jim Rockford.
