= Made in Jersey =

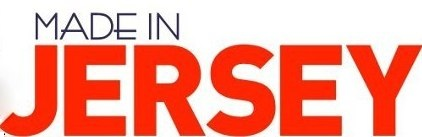
- Genre: Legal drama Comedy drama Crime drama
- Created by: Dana Calvo
- Starring: Janet Montgomery; Kristoffer Polaha; Kyle MacLachlan; Megalyn Echikunwoke; Toni Trucks; Erin Cummings; Felix Solis
- Theme music composer: Jules Larson; Rich Jacques
- Country of origin: United States
- Original language: English
- No. of seasons: 1
- No. of episodes: 8

Production
- Executive producers: Kevin Falls; Jamie Tarses; Julia Franz; Mark Waters
- Running time: 43 minutes
- Production companies: Left Coast Productions; FanFare Productions; CBS Television Studios; Sony Pictures Television

Original release
- Network: CBS
- Release: September 28 – December 29, 2012

Made in Jersey is an American legal drama television series that aired on CBS from September 28 to December 29, 2012. The network ordered the series in May 2012. On October 10, 2012, after only two episodes aired, it was canceled and removed from the network's schedule, making it the first canceled series of the 2012–13 television season. On November 5, 2012, it was announced that CBS had planned to burn off the remaining six episodes beginning Saturday, November 24.

== Premise ==
A streetwise attorney, born and raised in New Jersey in a close Italian-American family, makes the transition from the state prosecutor's office in Trenton to a posh New York City law firm, where she must defend her clients while surviving her colleagues' skepticism.

== Cast and characters ==
=== Main ===
- Janet Montgomery as Martina Garretti, a streetwise, first-year associate born and raised in a blue collar family in New Jersey who gets a job at the high powered law firm of Stark & Rowan in New York. She is a former assistant district attorney in Trenton, New Jersey.
- Toni Trucks as Cyndi Vega, Martina's secretary at the firm and her best friend.
- Erin Cummings as Bonnie Garretti, Martina's older sister who works as a manicurist.
- Felix Solis as River Brody, the firm's investigator who helps Martina with her cases and is a former LAPD detective.
- Kyle MacLachlan as Donovan Stark, a founding partner at Stark & Rowan.
- Kristoffer Polaha as Nolan Adams, a third-year associate at the firm.
- Megalyn Echikunwoke as Riley Prescott, a second-year associate at the firm who is the daughter of the former United States Ambassador to Sweden and Martina's foil.
- Donna Murphy as Darlene Garretti, Martina's mother.

Pablo Schreiber as Luke Aronson, a lawyer at the firm who was Martina's love interest, and Stephanie March as Natalie Minka, an established lawyer at the firm who is turned off by Martina's style, were originally cast as series regulars but only appeared in the pilot. They were replaced by Polaha and Echikunwoke, respectively.

=== Recurring ===
- Jessica Blank as Deb Garretti Keenan, Martina's married older sister
- Michael Drayer as Albert Garretti, Martina's brother
- Lewis Grosso as Joseph Keenan, Martina's brother-in-law
- Joseph Siravo as Gavin Garretti, Martina's brother
- Drew Beasley as Charlie Garretti, Martina's brother
- Nicolette Pierini as Annika Keenan

== Episodes ==
No.	Title	Directed by	Written by	Original release date	Prod. code	U.S. viewers (millions)
1	"Pilot"	Mark Waters	Dana Calvo	September 28, 2012	101	7.82
2	"Cacti"	Adam Davidson	Brett Conrad	October 5, 2012	102	6.78
3	"Camelot"	Mark Waters	Dana Calvo	November 24, 2012	105	2.52
4	"Payday"	Victor Nelli	Kevin Falls	December 1, 2012	104	5.13
5	"Wingman"	Jeff Bleckner	Alicia Kirk	December 22, 2012	103	2.47
6	"Ancient History"	Vincent Misiano	Alfonso H. Moreno	December 22, 2012	106	2.98
7	"The Farm"	Adam Davidson	Katie Wech	December 29, 2012	107	2.94
8	"Ridgewell"	Eric Stoltz	Jan Nash	December 29, 2012	108	2.81

== International broadcasts ==
In Canada, the show has been picked up by Global Television Network, where it aired on the same night as the American broadcast, but at different times depending on the region and simultaneous substitution opportunities. In Portugal, it premiered on TVSéries on October 18, 2012.

== Critical reception ==
The show was met with mixed reviews from critics, with a score of 43 out of 100 based on 18 reviews from Metacritic. Despite stating that it "sounds from a bare-bones description as if it were a cloddish comedy that deserves immediate cancellation," Neil Genzlinger of The New York Times added that "if the show's writers can deepen the characters, Made in Jersey just might continue to be worth watching."
