= I'm with Lucy =

- DVD cover
- Directed by: Jon Sherman
- Written by: Eric Pomerance
- Produced by: Fabien Liron; Tim Perell
- Starring: Monica Potter; Gael García Bernal; David Boreanaz; John Hannah; Anthony LaPaglia; Henry Thomas
- Cinematography: Tom Richmond
- Edited by: Elizabeth Kling
- Music by: Stephen Endelman
- Production companies: Gaumont; Fabulous Films; Process Productions
- Distributed by: Gaumont Buena Vista International (France); Columbia Pictures (United States; through Sony Pictures Releasing)
- Release dates: 4 September 2002 (France); 3 November 2002 (United States)
- Running time: 90 minutes
- Countries: France; United States
- Language: English
- Budget: $15 million

I'm With Lucy is a 2002 romantic comedy directed by Jon Sherman starring Monica Potter in the title role, with Henry Thomas, David Boreanaz, Anthony LaPaglia, Gael García Bernal and John Hannah.

== Plot ==
Lucy is a journalist who is dumped by her "perfect" boyfriend and then goes on a series of dates with five different men—in January Doug, an entomologist; in May Gabriel, a successful playwright; in July Bobby, a former baseball player; in September Barry, a computer store owner; and in December Luke, an orthopedic doctor.

Lucy acts differently around each of the men—she is drunk on her date with Doug; she uncharacteristically jumps into bed with Gabriel; she is, at first, irritated with but then moved by ex-baseball star Bobby; her date with Barry gets off to a rough start, but then while on their date, they run into her parents and end up having dinner with them; and her date with Luke is sidetracked when they see a colleague of his who is with his daughter, Eve, who appears to have her own eye on Luke.

Both Lucy and Doug are on the rebound, they don't connect but she does get him to come out of his shell by the end of the date.

She takes Bobby to several places that put him completely out of his element and then he takes her to a baseball card show where she sees a different side of him.

Lucy's date with Gabriel essentially becomes a one-night stand when she realizes he isn't what she wants in life.

She becomes serious with Luke, but an incident at a restaurant in which he is rude to one of the waiters makes her realize he isn't who she wants, either.

Barry surprises her several times throughout the movie with touching and thoughtful gestures, which of course win her over in the end.

== Cast ==
- Monica Potter as Lucy
- Henry Thomas as Barry
- David Boreanaz as Luke
- Anthony LaPaglia as Bobby
- John Hannah as Doug
- Gael García Bernal as Gabriel
- Harold Ramis as Jack
- Julie Christie as Dori
- Robert Klein as Dr. Salkind
- Julie Gonzalo as Eve
- Julianne Nicholson as Jo
- Flora Martínez as Melissa
- Craig Bierko as Peter

== Production ==
Budgeted with $15 million, I'm with Lucy started filming on April 16, 2001. The film was shot in New York City and in Florida.

== Reception ==
Lisa Nesselson of Variety wrote: "Performances are sharper than the material in I'm With Lucy, a moderately diverting comedy. Although Monica Potter is versatile and amusing in the title role, pic feels like a string of incidents rather than a full-bodied narrative."
