= The Rockford Files (2027 TV series) =

American drama

- Genre: Procedural drama Crime drama
- Based on: The Rockford Files by Roy Huggins; Stephen J. Cannell
- Developed by: Mike Daniels
- Starring: David Boreanaz; Felix Solis; Jacki Weaver; Michaela McManus; Ilfenesh Hadera
- Country of origin: United States
- Original language: English

Production
- Executive producers: Carl Beverly; Chris Leanza; Mike Daniels; Sarah Timberman
- Producer: David Boreanaz
- Production companies: 6107 Productions; Timberman/Beverly Productions; Universal Television

Original release
- Network: NBC

The Rockford Files is an upcoming American procedural drama television series created by Mike Daniels that is scheduled to premiere on January 7, 2027, on NBC. It is a reboot of the 1970s television series of the same name.

== Synopsis ==
The show follows James Rockford, newly paroled for a crime he didn't commit, who returns to work as a private investigator in Los Angeles but finds himself targeted by both the police and organized crime.

== Cast ==
- David Boreanaz as James Rockford
- Felix Solis as Nitty
- Jacki Weaver as TBA
- Michaela McManus as Kate
- Ilfenesh Hadera as TBA

== Episodes ==
No.	Title	Directed by	Written by	Original release date
1	"Pilot"	Greg Mottola	TBA	January 2, 2027

== Production ==
In 2009, NBC, Universal Media Studios and Steve Carell's Carousel Television produced a revival of the show. Dermot Mulroney was cast as Rockford, Alan Tudyk cast as Becker, Melissa Sagemiller was cast as Beth Davenport, and Beau Bridges was cast as Rocky. A pilot, directed by Michael W. Watkins, was filmed but never broadcast. Early audiences indicated that the pilot was not directed well. The remake was subsequently scrapped by NBC.

A feature adaptation was in development at Universal Pictures in 2012, with Vince Vaughn as producer and star. After James Garner's death in 2014, the film was indefinitely postponed.

A pilot was in the works from NBC for the 2026–2027 season. In February 2026, it was announced that David Boreanaz had been cast to play Rockford for the reboot, and Michaela McManus was cast as Kate. On May 8, 2026, the series was picked up by NBC. The series is set to premiere on January 7, 2027.
