= Cathy Rush =

College basketball coach (born 1947)

Biographical details
- Born: April 7, 1947 (age 79); Atlantic City, New Jersey, U.S.
- Education: West Chester University

Coaching career (HC unless noted)
- 1972–1977: Immaculata

Head coaching record
- Overall: 149–15

Accomplishments and honors

Championships
- 3 AIAW National (1972–1974)
- Basketball Hall of Fame; Inducted in 2008
- Women's Basketball Hall of Fame
Medal record
Women's basketball
Head coach for United States
Pan American Games
Gold medal – first place	1975 Mexico City, Mexico	Team competition

Cathy Rush (born Cathy Cowan; April 7, 1947) is a former basketball coach at Immaculata from 1972 to 1977. She led Immaculata to three consecutive AIAW national titles from 1972–1974. She led the Mighty Macs to six consecutive final four appearances in her six seasons with the school, attaining a 149–15 record. Rush was inducted into the Basketball Hall of Fame on April 7, 2008. She had also been inducted to the Women's Basketball Hall of Fame in 2000 and the Philadelphia Sports Hall of Fame in 2005.

A resident of Ventnor City, New Jersey, Rush grew up in Egg Harbor Township, New Jersey and graduated from Oakcrest High School in 1964. She received a Bachelor of Science in 1968 and a master's degree in education in 1972, both from West Chester University. She has two children with her ex-husband, former National Basketball Association referee and Supervisor of Officials Ed T. Rush.

The Mighty Macs, a movie about the season leading to the winning of the first women's national basketball championship in 1972, was released in October 2011. Rush is played by Carla Gugino.

== Early life ==
Rush was born in Atlantic City, New Jersey on April 7, 1947, to John and Alice Cowan. She grew up in Egg Harbor Township, New Jersey, a township with over 40,000 residents in 2010, but approximately 5,000 when she was in elementary school. Her elementary school consisted of two rooms, with a single teacher for each room. One room housed the first through third grades, while the other room was for the fourth through sixth grades.

When she reached eighth grade, Rush began playing basketball in the Six-on-six basketball style. Her scoring average was 30 points per game, which earned her the nickname "Big Gun", and she helped earn a position at the county tournament.

In her freshman year, she attended the brand new Oakcrest High School. She played basketball for the high school team, and despite being a freshman, won the county scoring title. However, when she became a sophomore, she learned that the school had dropped interscholastic sports for girls. At the same time, a new teacher arrived with gymnastics experience. The teacher started a gymnastics team, and Rush threw herself into gymnastics. She was appointed team captain, and specialized in the trampoline. Although not an interscholastic activity, the team toured and put on halftime shows and demonstrations. Rush graduated from the high school in 1964.

== College ==
Rush decided to attend West Chester State College in nearby Pennsylvania, majoring in physical education. She played on the basketball team for the first two years, but when the basketball coach left, she dropped basketball and switched to gymnastics. She graduated in 1968.

== Coaching—high school and junior high ==
After college, she accepted a coaching position at Springfield High School in Delaware County, Pennsylvania. This was not a permanent position, as she was filling in for a teacher who was on sabbatical. Rush taught classes, while coaching the basketball, lacrosse and field hockey teams. When the teacher on sabbatical returned, she accepted a position at General Wayne Junior High in Malvern, Pennsylvania. She taught physical education and health classes during her two-year stay at the school.

== Marriage ==
Ed T. Rush also attended West Chester University, but graduated in 1964, the year before Cathy arrived. They met on a date, at a basketball game in the Palestra. Cathy was a freshman at the time. They resumed dating two years later, and were married on June 1, 1968.

== Immaculata ==
While Rush was at General Wayne Junior High, the coaching opportunity became available at Immaculata, an all-girls Catholic school with an enrollment of 400 students. The job came with some challenges—the gym had burned down and there were no plans to replace it, so all games had to be away games. The salary was $450 per year and the school only had one basketball. Rush was only 22, barely older than the players she would be coaching. The five starting players were all commuters, driving to school for classes and practice. Yet Rush saw the positives, "It seemed like the perfect job – low key, no pressure, and a way to stay busy during the winter while my husband, Ed, was traveling." In addition to changes for Rush, the game was changing. The 1970–71 season was the first year of five player teams and the 30 second shot clock.

Practices were informal—Rush brought her two young boys, still toddlers, to practice. her husband Ed, jokes, "That's the Immaculata fastbreak: good defense, rebound, outlet pass, and then dodge the kids on the way up the court." Rush was pleasantly surprised at the skill level of her players, and told her husband, an NBA referee, that "I have some players". He condescendingly responded, "Oh, yes, dear. Of course you do." One of her strongest players was Theresa Shank (who would go on to a coaching career that earned her a spot in the Women's Basketball Hall of Fame). Shank was a six-foot center, who started the same year as Rush. The team started out with an 8–0 record. In their ninth game, Shank and Maureen Mooney didn't show up. They didn't have a charter bus, or even a school bus, so the players drove themselves to games. Shank and Mooney were car-pooling. When they didn't arrive for warm ups, Rush was initially angry, but as time passed, she became concerned. Just before the start of the game, the two arrived, announcing they had been in an auto accident. Mooney was shaken up, but Shank broke her collarbone. She was out for the season, and the team went 2–2 for their remaining four games.

== First championship ==
The following year, the new gym in Alumnae Hall was completed. The team would no longer have to play all of the games as visitors. However, the new gym wasn't large enough to accommodate bleachers, there was only room for a few rows of chairs. The players were responsible for setting up the chairs before the game and returning them after the game. With Shank now available, the team won all twelve of their regular season games, and earned a spot in the Regional Tournament.

The Regional Tournament format included four games in three days, to reduce the cost of lodging. The Immaculata team won their first three games, and in the final game, faced Rush's alma mater, West Chester State. That game wasn't close, with West Chester State winning by 32 points 70–38. The team thought their season was over and headed home. When they arrived home, they were surprised by a welcome home pep rally. They didn't realize that the invitation for the AIAW national tournament would include regular season results—they were invited as the 15th seed of the 16 invited teams. They were one of six teams to lose a game in the regionals, and earn a spot in the first ever AIAW women's basketball tournament.

The team had no budget for post-season travel. The team organized raffles to sell toothbrushes to raise enough money for the trip to Illinois State University. They weren't able to raise enough money for all eleven players so only eight players, plus the coach were able to go. Even then, they had to fly stand-by to stretch their meager funds. They stayed four to a room and two to a bed, limiting their daily spending to seven dollars for meals.

Their first opponent was South Dakota State. Immaculata won 60–47, to move on to the second round. The next day, they faced Indiana, and won a close game 49–46. Without any time off, they played the semifinal round against MSCW, who had won the national championship the prior year. The following day, they would face West Chester College once again, the team that had beaten them by 32 a few days earlier, and the national runner-up in both 1970 and 1971.

Despite Ed's lack of confidence—he cautioned Cathy—"Don't be disappointed when you lose", the result this time would be different. The Macs won a close game 52–48, and a pregnant Cathy Rush was the head coach of the first AIAW National Champions. On the trip home, someone arranged to upgrade the team to first class. When they arrived at the airport, the pilot asked the team to stay on the plane—a large crowd had gathered. Rush realized that her low-key job wasn't going to stay that way. As happy as they had been to win the game, the magnitude of the event didn't sink in until they came home. Only five fans had managed to travel to the tournament, but there were 500 fans at the airport when they returned.

Their nickname had been simply "Macs". After the team won the national championship, George Heaslip, the sports editor of the Daily Local News, wrote, "One thing, for sure. They're going to have to change that nickname. No more 'Macs.' How about 'The Mighty Macs'?". The nickname was picked up and the team have been known as the Mighty Macs ever since. The term was used for the title of the movie about their championship run.

== Repeat and three-peat ==
Rene Muth, later to become Rene Portland, the long-time Penn State women's basketball coach, was on each of the championship teams. Her father owned a hardware store, and provided some buckets which some of the parents and the nuns, banged on with wooden dowels to make noise. This was the beginning of the Bucket Brigade. The team still wore pleated tunics and Chuck Taylor Converse sneakers. Some teams wore tunics, while others wore shorts. The Immaculata team wore tunics until the end of the 1973 season, then switched to a two-piece blouse and skirt.

The Immaculata team again won all their regular season games in the 72–73 season, and earned a spot in the National Tournament. This year, the tournament was hosted by Queens College in New York, making travel easier. The first-round game was against Florida State, which Immaculata won 59–48. The quarter-finals match was against Western Washington, which they won 66–53. They moved on to play their third game in two days in the semi-final against Southern Connecticut, one of the premier teams of that era. Southern Connecticut had a twelve-point lead with three minutes to go in the game. The Macs fought back and took the lead, only to have Southern Connecticut tie the game with 26 seconds remaining. Marianne Crawford, the freshman guard for Immaculata, put up a shot, but it was coming off the rim. Theresa Shank saw it, and tipped it in as the buzzer sounded for the two point win, 47–45.

The win set up the championship between Immaculata and Queens, playing on the Queens home court. The venue had a seating capacity of 3,000, Some thought the 1972 run had been a fluke, but the repeat performance was convincing fans the Immaculata team was very good. In the championship game, the final score of 59–52 is consistent with a reasonably close game, but the score was 59–37 in the fourth quarter when Rush pulled her starters and the bench players allowed the Queens team to score 15 consecutive points. The win completed the first undefeated season in US college women's basketball history, and the second consecutive National Championship for Immaculata.

The Immaculata team went on to win an unprecedented third consecutive championship in the 1974 tournament. After winning a ten-point victory over Kansas State, Immaculata had two close games, winning by four points over Indiana, and by two points over William Penn. In the final, Immaculata faced Mississippi State College for Women, but won by 15 points 68–53.

== Subsequent years ==
Although Shank, the leading player for the Macs, graduated in 1974, the team continued to play at a high level. In 1975, they again earned a spot in the national tournament, and reached the final game against Delta State, coached by Margaret Wade and featuring one of the best players in basketball history Lusia Harris. The Delta State fans had responded to the Bucket Brigade by acquiring wooden blocks as their own noisemakers. Unfortunately, what started as good fun turned ugly, with tempers flaring and some participants throwing dowels and blocks. When the Immaculata parents, following their tradition, brought their buckets to the game to act as noisemakers, they were met by a court order. Delta State had managed to convince a judge to issue a legal writ to bar noisemakers from the game. Delta State went on to win the game 90–81, to win the first of three consecutive championships.

Immaculata made it all the way to the title game in 1976, but again faced Delta State and again Delta State prevailed, this time 69–64. In 1977 Immaculata played in the consolation game for third place and lost to Tennessee 91–71. Although finishing fourth in the nation was a significant accomplishment, the impact of Title IX was allowing many schools to offer scholarships to the best players. Rush decided to retire to raise her family, and left active coaching with a record of 149-15 for a winning percentage of 91%.

== Notable Firsts ==
=== First nationally televised game ===
The first nationally televised game is played by Maryland and Immaculata on January 27, 1975. Some sources report that Immaculata won 80–48, while others report 85–63.

=== First women's basketball game in Madison Square Garden ===
Immaculata played Queens College on February 22, 1975, in front of 11,969 spectators. The arena played Helen Reddy's I Am Woman as the fans entered the arena. The game was a one-point game late in the game, when a foul and a technical were called against Queens but the wrong Immaculata player went to the line. The momentum swung to Immaculata in the confusion and the Macs won a close game 65–61.

=== First women's college team to play outside the US ===
Immaculata traveled to Australia in July 1974, playing 18 games over the course of the month-long trip, the first United States college team to play a game outside the United States.

=== First undefeated season ===
The 1973 Immaculata team won all twenty of their games, counting the post-season tournament to become the first undefeated college team for a season.

== USA Basketball Pan American team ==
The USA Basketball team had had success in the Pan American games with gold medals in 1955,1959, and 1963, but had come in second place in both 1967 and 1971. In 1975, the team was determined to win the gold, and Cathy Rush was named head coach. One of the leading players on the Pan American team was Lusia Harris, whose Delta State team had beaten Immaculata in the 1975 Championship game, and would do so again in 1976. There were other notable players on the team, such as Pat Head (Summitt), Ann Meyers and others, as well as a 17-year-old high school player, Nancy Lieberman.

The games were originally planned for Chile, then Brazil when Chile withdrew the offer to host, and then Mexico City, where they were eventually held in October. The team roster and coaches were identical to the US National team that placed eighth in the World Championships, held a few weeks earlier. That team finished with a disappointing 4–3 record, but lost the three games by a total of nine points.

The USA's team first opponent was Mexico, a team that finished ahead of the US at the World Championships, and would end up the silver medal-winning in this competition. The USA team beat them 99–65, setting a tone for the event. The USA next beat Canada 75–56. They followed that game with a convincing 116–28 victory over El Salvador. Their following game against Cuba was the only close game, with the USA winning by six points 70–64. The USA team then went on to defeat the Dominican Republic 99–50, and Columbia 74–48. This set up the final with Brazil.

The team from Brazil had beaten the USA team in the prior three Pan American competitions, and had won the gold medal in two of them. This time, the USA team won easily 74–55, earning the gold medal for the first time in twelve years.

== Title IX impact ==
The passage of Title IX improved the accessibility of women's sports at many schools, where programs had to increase funding for women's team. Ironically, it hurt Immaculata, who could not financially complete with the larger schools. They decided not to issue scholarships, which made it difficult to attract the top talent. Rush said, "All of a sudden girls who would have been coming to Immaculata were going elsewhere...We didn't have a chance with those players." Eventually, the school transitioned from Division I to Division III. Rush initially opposed the decision not to offer scholarships, but over time, recognized why the decision was made.

== Coaching camps ==
Before Rush decided to retire from active coaching, she and her husband Ed started a summer basketball camp. The camp, known originally in 1971 as the Cathy Rush Basketball Camp, was renamed as the Future Stars Camps, which still operates today (as of 2022). Many notable coaches worked as counselors at some of these camps, including Geno Auriemma and Muffet McGraw.

== Breast cancer survivor ==
In 1990, Rush was diagnosed with breast cancer, but she did not want anyone to know. She went through chemotherapy successfully, and went on to become a spokesperson for the American Cancer Society.

== Awards and honors ==
- 1975 Coach of the gold medal-winning U.S. Women's basketball team at the Pan American games
- 1987 Inducted into Pennsylvania Sports Hall of Fame
- 2000 Inducted into Women's Basketball Hall of Fame
- 2000 West Chester University Athletic Hall Of Fame
- 2008 Inducted into Naismith Memorial Basketball Hall of Fame
- 2008 Inducted into Chester County Sports Hall Of Fame
- 2012 Pennsylvania State Athletic Conference Award of Merit
- 2012 Lapchick Character Award (named after Joe Lapchick)

== Accomplishments ==
- Brought the tiny Immaculata College (under 500 students) into the National spotlight with five trips to the championship game of the AIAW women's basketball tournament in six years, winning three back-to-back titles.
- Compiled a career record of 149 wins and 15 losses — a 91% winning percentage.
- Coached and directed the 1975 U.S. Women's basketball team at the Pan American games, leading the team to a gold medal finish.
- Member of the U.S. Olympic Committee of Women's basketball.
- Received Special Achievement Awards from both the New Jersey and Philadelphia Sports Writers' Association.
- 1976—Rush co-authored (with Lawrie Mifflin) a book Women's Basketball on basketball techniques. ISBN 978-0801587948
- 1979—Served as the director of player personnel and promotions for the California Dreams, a member of the WPBL.

== Current activities ==
- Future Stars Camps — Cathy is the founding president of Future Stars. For over 35 years, Future Stars has been conducting basketball, field hockey, soccer, all sport, and sports and arts camps for girls and boys.
- Color Commentating — Cathy has been the color commentator several major networks, including NBC, CBS, CBN, ESPN, PRISM and the Sport Channel.
- Cathy is a breast cancer survivor and a spokesperson for the American Cancer Society.

== Coaching tree ==
Seven coaches can trace their background to Cathy Rush:

Name	Current or most recent position	Location	Relationship to Rush	Years
Theresa Grentz	Head coach	Lafayette College (retired)	Player	1971–1974
Marianne Stanley	Head coach	Indiana Fever	Player	1973–1976
Ferne Labati	Head coach	University of Miami (retired)	Assistant coach	1976–1978
Rene Portland	Head coach	Penn State (retired)	Player	1972–1975
Suzie McConnell-Serio	Head coach	University of Pittsburgh (retired)	Player (for Rene Portland)	1984–1988
Nancy Lieberman	Assistant coach	Sacramento Kings (retired)	Player (for Marianne Crawford Stanley)	1978–1980
Anne Donovan	Head coach	Connecticut Sun (retired)	Player (for Marianne Crawford Stanley)	1979–1983

Cathy Rush Coaching Tree
