= Felix Solis =

American actor, film director, and film producer

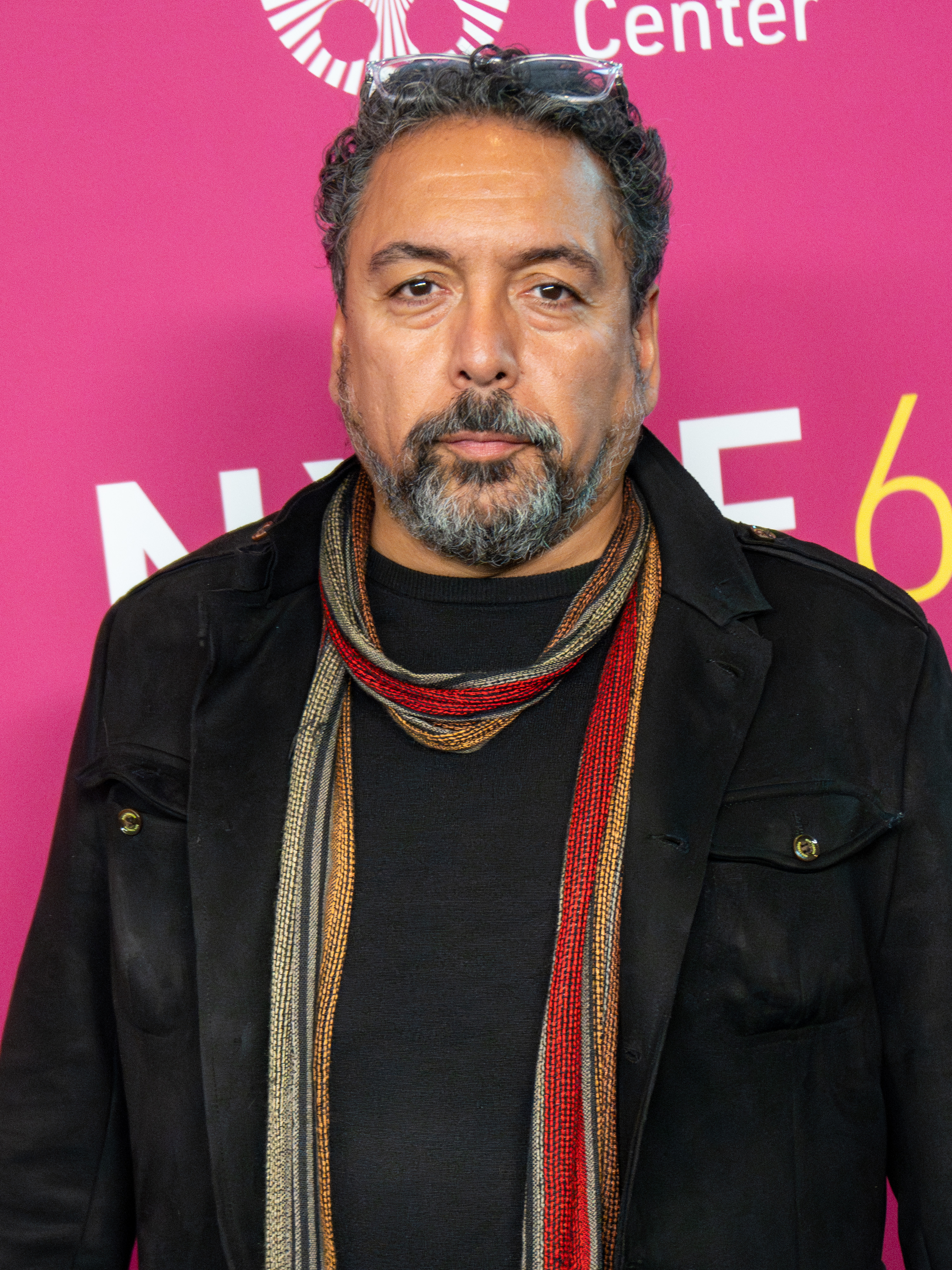
- Solis in 2024
- Born: Felix Angel Solis; September 17, 1971 (age 55); New York City, U.S.
- Occupations: Actor; film director; film producer; stage director
- Years active: 1995–present
- Partner: Liza Fernandez

Felix Angel Solis (born September 17, 1971) is an American actor, film director, and film producer.

== Early life ==
Born on the Upper West Side and raised in Chelsea/Greenwich Village area of New York City, to parents who were both born in Puerto Rico, Felix considers himself a Nuyorican.

== Career ==
Solis first started working on shows set in NYC such as New York Undercover, NYPD Blue, Third Watch and the film Empire (starring opposite John Leguizamo and Peter Sarsgaard). He then appeared in acclaimed television shows such as The West Wing, OZ, Law & Order: SVU, The Sopranos, Law & Order: Criminal Intent, Damages and Fringe, and Ozark; and numerous films such as The Forgotten (opposite Julianne Moore), Wes Craven's My Soul to Take, Man on a Ledge (opposite Sam Worthington and Ed Harris), and Arbitrage (opposite Tim Roth).

With his roots in theatre, Felix has also continued to work on stage receiving the HOLA 2013 Award for Outstanding Performance by a Male Actor for the production of Basilica at New York's prestigious Cherry Lane Theatre; a Connecticut Critics Circle Award in 2008 for Boleros for the Disenchanted and a Helen Hayes Award nomination for Outstanding Lead Actor in a Passion Play in 2006. As a stage director, Solis helmed Raúl Castillo's Knives and Other Sharp Objects at the Joseph Papp Public Theater in 2009.

Solis has originated parts in In Arabia We'd All Be Kings and Our Lady of 121st Street, both written by Stephen Adly Guirgis with direction by Philip Seymour Hoffman. He performed at the Cherry Lane Theater's stage in Havana Is Waiting by Eduardo Machado. Solis has also been a member of The Actors Studio since 2001, where he has appeared in plays including Salome starring Dianne Wiest and Al Pacino.

Al Pacino wrote him to thank him for his performance in the original production of Our Lady Of 121st Street with the LAByrinth Theater Company, of which he has been a member since 1999.

Solis has appeared in over 18 films including The Forgotten, Taking Chance, The International, My Soul to Take, and Gun Hill Road (winner of the 2011 Grand Jury Nominee at the Sundance Film Festival). Solis' television appearances include The Following, The Good Wife, Made in Jersey, NYC 22, Weekends at Bellevue, Criminal Minds, Army Wives, ATF-The Line, Damages, Fringe, The Sopranos, Oz, The West Wing, Third Watch, NYPD Blue, New York Undercover, and Blue Bloods.

In 2013 Solis co-created a film production company called Subway Token Films with his partner, actress Liza Fernandez. Their first short film, Tinto, shot on location in the Maipo Valley wine region of Chile, South America, premiered at the Tribeca Film Festival in 2014, getting nominated for Best Short Narrative. It also screened at the Shnit Worldwide Short Film Festival in 2015. Their next short film, iHeart (which Solis directed), made its world premiere at the Hoboken International Film Festival; it won the Award of Merit at One-Reeler Short Film Competition, and continues its way through the festival circuit. His next short film, Going Down, was shot in Los Angeles in June and is in post-production. He is an active volunteer at the 52nd Street Project, a non-profit group that matches inner-city kids with professional theatre artists to introduce them to the business and craft of theatre production. He is also a supporter of the ASPCA and WSPA.

Solis had a recurring role on The Following. He was a regular on the CBS TV series Made in Jersey starring Kyle MacLachlan, and Janet Montgomery. On the same network he played Sgt. Terry Howard on NYC 22, produced by Jane Rosenthal and Robert De Niro, as well as a recurring role on The Good Wife as the "No-Nonsense" Det. Kevin Rodriguez. Solis also landed a role on USA’s Colony playing Geronimo, and ABC’s The Family playing Editor-in-Chief Gus Flores. Felix was cast in the series regular in ABC's Ten Days in the Valley as Commander Gomez that premiered in October 2017.

Since 2022 Solis has appeared as cross-over character FBI Special Agent Matt Garza on The Rookie and The Rookie: Feds.

== Filmography ==
=== Film ===
Year	Title	Role	Notes
1995	Cousin Howard	Allen	
2002	Empire	Jose	
2003	El Círculo Vicioso	Mata	
2004	Mimmo & Paulie	Mimmo	Short
2004	The Forgotten	Detective Brasher	
2005	Everyone's Depressed	Carlos	Short
2005	La muerte es pequeña	-	Short
2005	End of the Spear	Julio	
2007	Kid	Martin	Short
2009	The International	Detective Iggy Ornelas	
2009	Reunion	Pete	
2010	My Soul to Take	Chela	
2011	Gun Hill Road	Pete	
2012	Arbitrage	A.D.A. Ray Deferlito	
2012	Man on a Ledge	Nestor	
2012	You're Nobody 'til Somebody Kills You	Detective Meil	
2014	Tinto	-	Short
2014	Fugly!	Pops	
2016	Tallulah	Manuel	
2016	iHeart	Bartender	Short
2018	Atlantic City	Junior	Short
2022	Allswell in New York	Desmond	
2024	Unfrosted	El Sucre	
2024	The Friend	Hektor	
2025	Predator: Killer of Killers	John J. Torres' Father (voice)	

=== Television ===
Year	Title	Role	Notes
1996	New York Undercover	Felipe	Episode: "Brown Like Me"
1997	NYPD Blue	Victor	Episode: "Lost Israel: Part 1"
1997	Law & Order	CSU Scapelli	Episode: "Harvest"
1999	Law & Order: Special Victims Unit	Nick	Episode: "...Or Just Look Like One"
1999	Law & Order	Tino	Episode: "Hate"
2000	Third Watch	Smith	Episode: "Faith"
2000	The Sopranos	Fishman	Episode: "The Happy Wanderer"
2001	The West Wing	Hammaker	Episode: "Ways and Means"
2002	Law & Order: Criminal Intent	Cardenas	Episode: "Malignant"
2003	Oz	Reynaldo Escobales	Episode: "A Failure to Communicate"
2003	Law & Order: Special Victims Unit	Narc	Episode: "Loss"
2004	One Life to Live	Benicio	Regular cast
2005	Law & Order: Trial by Jury	Miguel Guzman	Episode: "Bang & Blame"
2006	Conviction	Mr. Diaz	Episode: "Madness"
2006	Law & Order	Mr. Garcia	Episode: "Magnet"
2007	The Knights of Prosperity	Jaime Santanita	Recurring cast
2007	The Sopranos	Edgar Ramirez	Episode: "The Second Coming"
2007	Law & Order: Criminal Intent	Ray Delgado	Episode: "Amends"
2009	Damages	Rudy Vasquez	Episode: "I Lied, Too."
2009	Fringe	Daniel Hicks	Episode: "The Transformation"
2009	Law & Order	Livan Santana	Episode: "Anchors Away"
2009	Taking Chance	Philly Cargo Worker	TV movie
2010	Criminal Minds	Nelson G.	Episode: "The Fight"
2010	Army Wives	Captain William Hele	Episode: "Scars and Stripes"
2010–15	The Good Wife	Det. Kevin Rodriguez	Guest (season 1 & 5-7), recurring cast (season 2)
2012	NYC 22	Sgt. Terry Howard	Main cast
2012	Made in Jersey	River Brody	Main cast
2013	Franklin & Bash	Detective	Episode: "Freck"
2014	Nurse Jackie	Joan's Husband	Episode: "Sidecars and Spermicide"
2014–15	The Following	Agent Jeff Clarke	Recurring cast (season 2), guest (season 3)
2015	Chicago P.D.	Lieutenant Guthrie	Episode: "What Puts You on That Ledge"
2015	Elementary	Prentice Gutierrez	Episode: "For All You Know"
2015	Blue Bloods	Hector Florez	Episode: "New Rules" & "The Art of War"
2016	Colony	Geronimo	Recurring cast (season 1)
2016	The Family	Gus Flores	Recurring cast
2016	Drew	Lieutenant Ford	TV movie
2016–17	Hawaii Five-0	Jorge Moralez	Episode: "Ka'ili aku" & "Ka 'Aelike"
2017	One Day at a Time	Ron	Episode: "Pride & Prejudice"
2017	Mindhunter	Detective Molina	Episode #1.2
2017	Ten Days in the Valley	Commander Elliot Gomez	Main cast
2018	SEAL Team	Colonel Martinez	Recurring cast (season 2)
2020	Amazing Stories	Lance	Episode: "Dynoman and the Volt!!"
2020	I Know This Much Is True	Nurse	Episode: "Four"
2020–22	Ozark	Omar Navarro	Recurring cast (season 3), main cast (season 4)
2020–22	Charmed	Ray Vera	Recurring cast (season 2 & 4)
2022–23	The Rookie: Feds	Matthew "Matt" Garza	Main cast
2022–present	The Rookie	Matthew "Matt" Garza	Recurring cast (seasons 4-8)
2023	City on Fire	Bruno	Recurring cast
2025	The Recruit	Tom Wallace	Recurring cast (season 2)
2025	Sirens	Jose	Main cast
2027	The Rockford Files	Nitty	Main cast

=== Video games ===
Year	Title	Role	Notes
2006	Grand Theft Auto: Vice City Stories	Jerry Martinez	
2008	Grand Theft Auto IV	The Crowd of Liberty City	
