= STA-21 =

United States Navy commissioning program

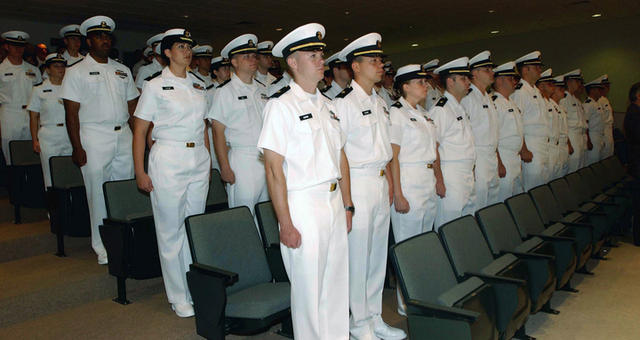
STA 21 graduating class of June 23, 2005.

STA-21 or Seaman to Admiral - 21 is a United States Navy commissioning program, designed to enable active-duty sailors to get a college degree and become commissioned officers.

== History ==
Seaman to Admiral was previously one of several different paths for active-duty sailors to become commissioned officers. The diversity of programs lacked uniformity in benefits, selection procedures, educational opportunities, and program requirements, and created a confusing system of program applications, deadlines, and options for fleet applicants which was complex for the Navy to manage and administer. As a result, the Navy combined most of these commissioning paths into one consolidated program preserving the "Seaman to Admiral" name, possibly during the 1994 STA program rebirth.

In 2020 former enlisted SEAL Matthew J. Burns was promoted to rear admiral, making him the first sailor commissioned through the current Seaman to Admiral program to do so.

== Current ==
The STA-21 commissioning program is designed to allow active-duty sailors with high ability to gain a college education and become commissioned officers in the unrestricted line (URL), special duty officer (intelligence), special duty officer (cryptologic warfare, formerly information warfare and cryptologist), nurse corps (NC), nuclear, supply corps (SC), civil engineer corps (CEC), explosive ordnance disposal (EOD), or SEALs. The program is highly competitive for sailors selected from the fleet; the average selection rate has ranged from 10% to 24% from 2001 to 2010.

In 2011, the program became much more selective for non-nuclear applicants. In 2013, 19 non-nuclear officer candidates were selected out of 542 applicants (3.5%). For nuclear applicants, the average selection rate has ranged from 20% to 25% since 2010.

All STA-21 Officer Candidates report to the Naval Science Institute before going to their assigned college.
