= Ferne Labati =

Ferne Labati (born June 2, 1947) is the former women's basketball program head coach at Seton Hill University.

== Career ==
Labati previously served as the head women's basketball coach at University of Miami, where she became the school's all-time winningest coach. Throughout her coaching career, she has amassed 451 wins, making her only the 39th-ever coach to win 400 games. She was named the Russell Athletic/WBCA National Coach of the Year in 1992.

At Miami, she was named to the University of Miami Sports Hall of Fame in 2004. https://www.umsportshalloffame.com/ferne-labati.htmlhttps://www.umsportshalloffame.com/ferne-labati.html

She has coached one Kodak All-American, one Big East player of the year, and one Big East rookie of the year at Miami. In 1989, she led Miami to its first-ever NCAA tournament appearance. In 1992 and 1993, Miami won back-to-back Big East regular season championships, making the NCAA in both years. In 1993, the Hurricanes finished the year ranked 6th in the nation, their highest ranking ever.

Labati also coached for four seasons at Fairleigh Dickinson University.

== Coaching Record ==
Record table
Season	Team	Overall	Conference	Standing	Postseason
Miami Hurricanes (Big East Conference) (1988–2004)
1988–1989	Miami	21–8			NCAA first round
1989–1990	Miami	25–6			WNIT First Round
1990–1991	Miami	20–10	9–3		
1991–1992	Miami	30–2	18–0		NCAA Sweet 16
1992–1993	Miami	24–7	15–3		NCAA second round
1993–1994	Miami	10–17	7–11		
1994–1995	Miami	11–16	8–10		
1995–1996	Miami	14–16	9–9		
1996–1997	Miami	15–14	8–10		
1997–1998	Miami	19–10	13–5		NCAA first round
1998–1999	Miami	15–14	9–9		WNIT First Round
1999–2000	Miami	14–15	7–9		
2000–2001	Miami	13–15	6–10		
2001–2002	Miami	19–12	10–6		WNIT First Round
2002–2003	Miami	18–13	8–8		NCAA first round
2003–2004	Miami	22–7	11–5		NCAA first round
Miami Hurricanes (Atlantic Coast Conference) (2004–2005)
2004–2005	Miami	13–16	4–10		
Miami:		290–179			
Total:					
National champion Postseason invitational champion Conference regular season champion Conference regular season and conference tournament champion Division regular season champion Division regular season and conference tournament champion Conference tournament champion
