= Ed T. Rush =

American basketball referee

Ed T. Rush (born 1942) is a former professional basketball referee. He joined the NBA as a referee in 1966, at age 24, becoming the youngest referee in NBA history. In 1973, he left for the American Basketball Association but returned to the NBA when the ABA merged with that league in 1976. Rush became the NBA's director of officiating in 1998, and served in that position until 2003 when he was succeeded by Ronnie Nunn.

He was married to three-time AIAW women's basketball tournament winning coach and Basketball Hall of Famer Cathy Rush.

According to Dallas Mavericks owner Mark Cuban, Rush is unfit to manage a Dairy Queen.

== Pac-12 refereeing controversy ==
On April 1, 2013, CBS Sports reported that during a meeting before the 2013 Pac-12 men's basketball tournament Rush had jokingly offered $5,000 or a trip to Cancún to referees who would properly handle the antics of Arizona head coach Sean Miller, who was called for a controversial technical foul in Arizona's semi-final 2-point loss to UCLA, the first technical foul Miller had received that season. The report cited an unnamed referee who claimed that Rush intimidated the Pac-12's referees and "[bullied] everyone." Pac-12 commissioner Larry Scott responded to the allegations in a statement saying that the reports had been investigated and that the conference believed Rush had made the offer "in jest."
