= Katy =

Katy or KATY may refer to:

== People and characters ==
- Katy (given name)
- Katy (Marvel Cinematic Universe), a character from the Marvel Cinematic Universe

== Places ==
=== Serbia ===
- Káty, the Hungarian name of Kać, a village in Serbia

=== United States ===
- Katy, Missouri, an unincorporated community
- Katy, Texas, the only incorporated U.S. city with this name
  - Greater Katy, suburban region around the city of Katy; located in Greater Houston
  - Katy High School
- Katy, West Virginia, an unincorporated community
- Katy Township, Boone County, Missouri
- Watertown Regional Airport (ICAO code: KATY), an airport in South Dakota

== Art and entertainment ==
- Katy (series), a set of novels by Susan Coolidge
  - Katy (novel), a children's novel by Jacqueline Wilson inspired by the series
  - Katy (TV series), a TV adaptation of the Wilson novel
- Katy Fox, a character in Hollyoaks
- "K-K-K-Katy", a World War I-era song
- Katy (Marvel Cinematic Universe), a fictional character
- An ambulance in the film Ice Cold in Alex
- KATY-FM, a radio station of California, United States
- "Katy Too", a song by Johnny Cash
- "Katy", a poem by Frank O'Hara
- Katy, la oruga, (aka Katy Caterpillar), a Mexican series of animated films

== Other uses ==
- Katy (apple), an apple variety
- Missouri–Kansas–Texas Railroad, sometimes called "the Katy", from which the above U.S. places take their name
- KATY-FM, a radio station of California, United States

== Katies ==
Katies, the plural of "Katy", may refer to:

- Katies (1981–2004), a British Thoroughbred racehorse
- The Katies, a Tennessee powerpop band
- Katies, an Australian womenswear chain owned by Mosaic Brands

== See also ==
- Katydid (disambiguation)
- Katie (disambiguation)
- Kati (disambiguation)
- Cati (disambiguation)
- KT (disambiguation)
- Kathi (disambiguation)
- Kathie
- Kąty (disambiguation)
- Cathie
- Cathy (given name)
