= Cathy (given name) =

- Gender: Female

Other names
- Related names: Catherine, Katherine, Cathryn, Kathryn, Kathie, Kathi, Cathie

Cathy is a feminine given name. It is a pet form of Catherine or Cathleen.

Cathy may refer to:

== People ==
=== Artists ===
- Cathy de Monchaux, British sculptor
- Cathy Guisewite, American cartoonist who created the comic strip Cathy
- Cathy Sisler, American artist
- Cathy Wilcox, Australian cartoonist and children‘s book illustrator

=== In sports ===
- Cathy Baker, New Zealand field hockey player
- Cathy Chedal, French alpine skier
- Cathy Freeman, Australian track and field athlete
- Cathy Gauthier, Canadian curler and broadcaster
- Cathy O'Brien, American long-distance runner
- Cathy Rattray-Williams, Jamaican sprinter
- Cathy Rigby, American gymnast and actress
- Cathy Sulinski, American javelin thrower
- Cathy Townsend (born 1937), Canadian ten-pin bowler

=== In acting ===
- Cathy Cavadini, American voice actress
- Cathy Downs, American film actress
- Cathy Jones, Canadian actress and comedian
- Cathy Keenan, Canadian actress
- Cathy O'Donnell, American actress
- Cathy Podewell, American actress
- Cathy Rigby, American actress and gymnast
- Cathy Silvers, daughter of actor/comedian Phil Silvers
- Cathy Tyson, British actress
- Cathy Weseluck, Canadian voice actress

=== In music ===
- Cathy Berberian, American mezzosoprano and composer
- Cathy Davey, Irish singer/songwriter
- Cathy Fink & Marcy Marxer, musical partners

=== In other fields ===
- Cathy Barriga, Chilean politician
- Cathy Cabral, Filipino civil engineer
- Cathy Cassidy, British author and illustrator
- Cathy Crowe, Canadian nurse and social activist
- Cathy Hackl, Costa Rican-American author
- Cathy Heffernan, Irish freelance journalist, documentarist and producer
- Cathy Mason, Northern Irish politician
- Cathy Nori (born 1967), Solomon Islands politician
- Cathy Peattie, Scottish politician
- Cathy Priest, Canadian bodybuilder and figure competitor
- Cathy Saldaña (born 1966), Philippine architect and master planner
- Cathy Smith (1947–2020), Canadian musician and criminal
- Cathy Tymniak, American politician
- Cathy Wood, American serial killer

== Fictional characters ==
- Cathy Ames, the main antagonist from East of Eden
- Cathy Brenner, a character in Alfred Hitchcock's film The Birds, played by Veronica Cartwright
- the title character of Cathy (comic strip)
- Cathy Lane, on The Patty Duke Show, played by Patty Duke
- Cathy Linton, from Wuthering Heights
- Cathy Matthews, from the British soap opera Coronation Street
- Cathy Simms, character in The Office
- Cathy, character in Palibhasa Lalake portrayed by Carmina Villarroel.
- Cathy Smith, a character from the animated science fiction series, Monster Buster Club.

== See also ==
- Cathee Dahmen (1945–1997), American model
- Catherina
- S. Truett Cathy (1921–2014), American businessman, investor, author, and philanthropist, founder of the fast food restaurant chain Chick-fil-A
- Bubba Cathy (born c. 1954), American billionaire businessman, son of the above
- Kathy, feminine given name
