= Heffernan =

Heffernan is an Irish surname derived from the Gaelic Ó hIfearnáin, which comes from the byname Ifearnán literally meaning 'little demon' or more metaphorically 'daredevil'. Heffernan gives rise to alternatives such as Heffernon and Hefferan. The name sometimes contains the O' prefix. According to historian C. Thomas Cairney, the O'Heffermans were the chiefly family of the Uaithni who were a tribe of the Erainn who were the second wave of Celts to settle in Ireland between about 500 and 100 BC.

== List of people surnamed Heffernan ==
- Angie Heffernan, Fijian activist
- Bill Heffernan (born 1943), Australian politician
- Bob Heffernan, Australian footballer
- Cathy Heffernan, Irish journalist, documentarist and producer
- Chris Heffernan (born 1979), Australian footballer
- Christian Heffernan (born 1978), Canadian football player
- Christy Heffernan (born 1957), Irish sportsman
- Daniel Heffernan (born 1987), English footballer
- Dean Heffernan (born 1980), Australian soccer player
- Elliott Heffernan (born 2012 or 2013), English child actor
- Frank Heffernan (1892–1938), Canadian hockey player
- Gavin Heffernan (born 1980), Canadian filmmaker
- Gerald Heffernan (1916–2007), Canadian ice hockey player
- Helen Heffernan, New Zealand microbiologist
- James Heffernan (Irish politician) (born 1979), Irish politician
- James J. Heffernan (1888–1967), American politician from New York
- John Heffernan (disambiguation), several people
- Josephine Heffernan (1876 - 1962), Irish-American nurse
- Kate Heffernan (born 1999), New Zealand cricketer
- Kevin Heffernan (disambiguation), several people
- Killian Heffernan (born 2002), Irish darts player
- Margaret Heffernan (born 1955), businesswoman and writer
- Michael Heffernan (disambiguation), several people
- Nathan Heffernan (1920–2007), American jurist
- Neil Heffernan (born 1970), American computer scientist
- Paul Heffernan (born 1981), Irish footballer
- Ray Heffernan (disambiguation), several people
- Robert Heffernan (born 1978), Irish walker
- Roy Heffernan (1926–1993), Australian wrestler
- Seamie Heffernan (born 1972), Irish jockey
- Virginia Heffernan (born 1969), American journalist
- William Heffernan (born 1940), American author
- William J. Heffernan (1872–1955), American politician from New York
- William Heffernan III, American politician from Connecticut

== Fictional characters ==
- Carrie Heffernan, fictional character in The King of Queens
- Doug Heffernan, fictional character in The King of Queens

== Other uses ==
- Heffernan v. City of Paterson, a 2016 U.S. Supreme Court case

== See also ==
- Irish clans

== Sources ==
- Heffernan at behindthename.com
