= Cathie =

Cathie is both a feminine given name and a surname. Notable people with the name include:

Given name:

- Cathie Adams (born 1950), American politician
- Cathie Beck (born 1955), American journalist and writer
- Cathie Black (born 1944), American educator
- Cathie Craigie (born 1954), Scottish politician
- Cathie Dunsford (born 1953), New Zealand writer
- Cathie Felstead (born 1954), English illustrator
- Cathie Jung, world record holder
- Cathie Linz, American writer
- Cathie Ounsted, Canadian politician
- Cathie Pelletier (born 1953), American writer
- Cathie Ryan, American singer
- Cathie Schweitzer, American women's basketball coach
- Cathie Taylor (born 1944), Canadian-born American actress and singer
- Cathie Wright (1929–2012), American politician

Surname:

- Bruce Cathie (1930–2013), New Zealand aviator and writer
- George Cathie (footballer, born 1876) (1876–1958), Australian rules footballer
- George Cathie (footballer, born 1905), Australian rules footballer
- Ian Cathie (1932–2017), Australian politician
- Poppy Cooksey (born 1940), British fencer, previously Janet Clouston Bewley Cathie

== See also ==
- Lake Cathie, New South Wales
- Kathie
- Kathy
- Cathy
- Kathi
