= Kathi =

Kathi may refer to:

- a short form of Kathleen (disambiguation)
- Kathiawari (horse) or Kathi, a horse breed from Kathiawar in Gujarat, India
- Kathi caste, a caste of Kathiawar in Gujarat, India
- a former small princely state part of the Mewas States in the former district of Khandesh, Maharashtra, India
- Kathi (film), a 1983 Indian film
- Kati roll or kathi roll, an Indian street food

== See also ==
- Cathie
- Cathy (disambiguation)
- Kathie
- Kathy
- Kati (disambiguation)
- Katie (disambiguation)
- Katy (disambiguation)
- Kath (disambiguation)
- Kathiawari (disambiguation)
- Kaththi, a 2014 Indian film by A. R. Murugadoss
