= 100 Classic Book Collection =

2008 e-book collection

- Developer: Genius Sonority
- Publisher: Nintendo
- Director: Masayuki Kawamoto
- Producer: Manabu Yamana
- Designers: Koji Noguchi; Mizuho Ishiyama; Shuhei Matsubara
- Artists: Ryo Koizumi; Harumi Mochizuki; Yasuo Inoue
- Composers: Mitsuhiro Kaneda; Kimihiro Abe; Noriyuki Kamikura
- Platform: Nintendo DS
- Release: JP: October 18, 2007; EU: December 26, 2008; AU: January 22, 2009; NA: June 15, 2010
- Genre: Educational
- Mode: Single-player

100 Classic Book Collection, known in North America as 100 Classic Books, is an e-book collection developed by Genius Sonority and published by Nintendo for the Nintendo DS. First released in Europe in December 2008, it was later released in Australia in January 2009, and in North America in June 2010. The software includes one hundred public domain works of literature.

Genius Sonority had previously released a similar collection of books in Japan, under the title DS Bungaku Zenshuu, in October 2007. A smaller version of the collection consisting of 20 books, under the title Chotto DS Bungaku Zenshu: Sekai no Bungaku 20, was released in Japan as a downloadable DSiWare application in February 2009. French and German versions, under the titles of 100 Livres Classiques and Bibliothek der klassischen Bücher respectively were released in March 2010.

== Features ==
100 Classic Book Collection features one hundred books stored in the DS cartridge. Several of the works included are Othello by William Shakespeare, Oliver Twist by Charles Dickens, and The Phantom of the Opera by Gaston Leroux. Additional free books were available to download via Nintendo Wi-Fi Connection until the discontinuation of the service on May 20, 2014.

The player is required to hold the DS like a book and can adjust the text size and change background music to listen to while reading. A bookmark feature allows the player to mark their place in the book, as well as resume from that point on restart of the software. The software offers a search feature for books in several different ways, including genre, author, and length. Players can access introductions for the books and read about the authors. A quiz feature asks players personality-related questions and recommends certain novels depending on the answers given. Players can send "trial versions" of the software to other DS users via the local Wi-Fi.

== Reception ==
100 Classic Book Collection debuted on UK sales charts at number 17 during its week of release, and moved up to number 8 the following week.

The content was well received, but critics felt the DS was not a suitable platform. Prior to the advent of Kindle, The Guardian newspaper reviewed the software as part of the "minority fad" of e-readers, declaring it bland and impersonal but good value for money. Eurogamer magazine criticised Nintendo for only using texts that were out of copyright and for not spending the extra for modern classics. They also found the text difficult to read due to the size of the screen, with unhelpful hyphenations, a low word number per page and distracting animations. The Telegraph newspaper agreed that the software offered good value for money but also criticised the size of the screen.

== Included books ==
=== List of books included ===
==== Europe/Australia ====
Title	Author
Little Women	Louisa May Alcott
Emma	Jane Austen
Mansfield Park	Jane Austen
Persuasion	Jane Austen
Pride and Prejudice	Jane Austen
Sense and Sensibility	Jane Austen
Lorna Doone	R. D. Blackmore
The Tenant of Wildfell Hall	Anne Brontë
Jane Eyre	Charlotte Brontë
The Professor	Charlotte Brontë
Shirley	Charlotte Brontë
Villette	Charlotte Brontë
Wuthering Heights	Emily Brontë
The Pilgrim's Progress	John Bunyan
Little Lord Fauntleroy	Frances Hodgson Burnett
The Secret Garden	Frances Hodgson Burnett
Alice's Adventures in Wonderland	Lewis Carroll
Through the Looking-Glass	Lewis Carroll
The Moonstone	Wilkie Collins
The Woman in White	Wilkie Collins
The Adventures of Pinocchio	Carlo Collodi
Lord Jim	Joseph Conrad
What Katy Did	Susan Coolidge
The Last of the Mohicans	James Fenimore Cooper
Robinson Crusoe	Daniel Defoe
Barnaby Rudge	Charles Dickens
Bleak House	Charles Dickens
A Christmas Carol	Charles Dickens
David Copperfield	Charles Dickens
Dombey and Son	Charles Dickens
Great Expectations	Charles Dickens
Hard Times	Charles Dickens
Martin Chuzzlewit	Charles Dickens
Nicholas Nickleby	Charles Dickens
The Old Curiosity Shop	Charles Dickens
Oliver Twist	Charles Dickens
The Pickwick Papers	Charles Dickens
A Tale of Two Cities	Charles Dickens
The Adventures of Sherlock Holmes	Arthur Conan Doyle
The Case-Book of Sherlock Holmes	Arthur Conan Doyle
The Count of Monte Cristo	Alexandre Dumas
The Three Musketeers	Alexandre Dumas
Adam Bede	George Eliot
Middlemarch	George Eliot
The Mill on the Floss	George Eliot
King Solomon's Mines	H. Rider Haggard
Far from the Madding Crowd	Thomas Hardy
The Mayor of Casterbridge	Thomas Hardy
Tess of the d'Urbervilles	Thomas Hardy
Under the Greenwood Tree	Thomas Hardy
The Scarlet Letter	Nathaniel Hawthorne
The Hunchback of Notre-Dame	Victor Hugo
Les Misérables	Victor Hugo
The Sketch Book of Geoffrey Crayon, Gent.	Washington Irving
Westward Ho!	Charles Kingsley
Sons and Lovers	D. H. Lawrence
The Phantom Of The Opera	Gaston Leroux
The Call of the Wild	Jack London
White Fang	Jack London
Moby-Dick	Herman Melville
Tales of Mystery & Imagination	Edgar Allan Poe
Ivanhoe	Walter Scott
Rob Roy	Walter Scott
Waverley	Walter Scott
Black Beauty	Anna Sewell
All's Well That Ends Well	William Shakespeare
Antony and Cleopatra	William Shakespeare
As You Like It	William Shakespeare
The Comedy of Errors	William Shakespeare
Hamlet	William Shakespeare
Henry V	William Shakespeare
Julius Caesar	William Shakespeare
King Lear	William Shakespeare
Love's Labour's Lost	William Shakespeare
Macbeth	William Shakespeare
The Merchant of Venice	William Shakespeare
A Midsummer Night's Dream	William Shakespeare
Much Ado About Nothing	William Shakespeare
Othello	William Shakespeare
Richard III	William Shakespeare
Romeo and Juliet	William Shakespeare
The Taming of the Shrew	William Shakespeare
The Tempest	William Shakespeare
Timon of Athens	William Shakespeare
Titus Andronicus	William Shakespeare
Twelfth Night	William Shakespeare
The Winter's Tale	William Shakespeare
Kidnapped	Robert Louis Stevenson
Strange Case of Dr Jekyll and Mr Hyde	Robert Louis Stevenson
Treasure Island	Robert Louis Stevenson
Uncle Tom's Cabin	Harriet Beecher Stowe
Gulliver's Travels	Jonathan Swift
Vanity Fair	William Makepeace Thackeray
Barchester Towers	Anthony Trollope
Adventures of Huckleberry Finn	Mark Twain
The Adventures of Tom Sawyer	Mark Twain
Around the World in Eighty Days	Jules Verne
20,000 Leagues Under the Sea	Jules Verne
The Importance of Being Earnest	Oscar Wilde
The Picture of Dorian Gray	Oscar Wilde

==== North America ====
Title	Author
Little Women	Louisa May Alcott
Emma	Jane Austen
Pride and Prejudice	Jane Austen
Sense and Sensibility	Jane Austen
The Wonderful Wizard of Oz	L. Frank Baum
Lorna Doone	R. D. Blackmore
Jane Eyre	Charlotte Brontë
Wuthering Heights	Emily Brontë
Little Lord Fauntleroy	Frances Hodgson Burnett
The Secret Garden	Frances Hodgson Burnett
Tales from the Arabian Nights	Richard Francis Burton
Alice's Adventures in Wonderland	Lewis Carroll
Through the Looking-Glass	Lewis Carroll
Don Quixote	Miguel de Cervantes
The Man Who Was Thursday	G. K. Chesterton
The Napoleon of Notting Hill	G. K. Chesterton
The Awakening	Kate Chopin
The Moonstone	Wilkie Collins
The Woman in White	Wilkie Collins
Heart of Darkness	Joseph Conrad
Lord Jim	Joseph Conrad
The Deerslayer	James Fenimore Cooper
The Last of the Mohicans	James Fenimore Cooper
The Red Badge of Courage	Stephen Crane
Moll Flanders	Daniel Defoe
Robinson Crusoe	Daniel Defoe
Bleak House	Charles Dickens
A Christmas Carol	Charles Dickens
David Copperfield	Charles Dickens
Great Expectations	Charles Dickens
Oliver Twist	Charles Dickens
A Tale of Two Cities	Charles Dickens
The Brothers Karamazov	Fyodor Dostoevsky
Crime and Punishment	Fyodor Dostoevsky
The Adventures of Sherlock Holmes	Arthur Conan Doyle
The Hound of the Baskervilles	Arthur Conan Doyle
The Count of Monte Cristo	Alexandre Dumas
The Man in the Iron Mask	Alexandre Dumas
Middlemarch	George Eliot
Silas Marner	George Eliot
The Diary of a Nobody	George and Weedon Grossmith
Allan Quatermain	H. Rider Haggard
King Solomon's Mines	H. Rider Haggard
Far from the Madding Crowd	Thomas Hardy
Tess of the d'Urbervilles	Thomas Hardy
The Scarlet Letter	Nathaniel Hawthorne
Tanglewood Tales for Girls and Boys	Nathaniel Hawthorne
A Wonder-Book for Girls and Boys	Nathaniel Hawthorne
The Four Million	O. Henry
The Odyssey	Homer
The Prisoner of Zenda	Anthony Hope
The Hunchback of Notre-Dame	Victor Hugo
Les Misérables	Victor Hugo
The Sketch Book of Geoffrey Crayon, Gent.	Washington Irving
The Aspern Papers	Henry James
The Turn of the Screw	Henry James
The Jungle Book	Rudyard Kipling
Kim	Rudyard Kipling
The Man Who Would Be King	Rudyard Kipling
The Phantom of the Opera	Gaston Leroux
The Call of the Wild	Jack London
White Fang	Jack London
The Princess and Curdie	George MacDonald
The Princess and the Goblin	George MacDonald
The Prince	Niccolò Machiavelli
Moby-Dick	Herman Melville
Utopia	Thomas More
Rights of Man	Thomas Paine
Tales of Mystery & Imagination	Edgar Allan Poe
Ivanhoe	Walter Scott
Waverley	Walter Scott
Black Beauty	Anna Sewell
Hamlet	William Shakespeare
King Lear	William Shakespeare
Macbeth	William Shakespeare
A Midsummer Night's Dream	William Shakespeare
Othello	William Shakespeare
Romeo and Juliet	William Shakespeare
The Taming of the Shrew	William Shakespeare
The Tempest	William Shakespeare
Frankenstein	Mary Shelley
Kidnapped	Robert Louis Stevenson
Strange Case of Dr Jekyll and Mr Hyde	Robert Louis Stevenson
Dracula	Bram Stoker
Uncle Tom's Cabin	Harriet Beecher Stowe
Gulliver's Travels	Jonathan Swift
Vanity Fair	William Makepeace Thackeray
Walden	Henry David Thoreau
Anna Karenina	Leo Tolstoy
War and Peace	Leo Tolstoy
Barchester Towers	Anthony Trollope
Adventures of Huckleberry Finn	Mark Twain
The Adventures of Tom Sawyer	Mark Twain
A Connecticut Yankee in King Arthur's Court	Mark Twain
Journey to the Center of the Earth	Jules Verne
20,000 Leagues Under the Sea	Jules Verne
The Time Machine	H. G. Wells
The Age of Innocence	Edith Wharton
The Importance of Being Earnest	Oscar Wilde
The Picture of Dorian Gray	Oscar Wilde

=== List of additional downloadable books ===
==== Europe/Australia ====
Title	Author
Northanger Abbey	Jane Austen
Agnes Grey	Anne Brontë
What Katy Did At School	Susan Coolidge
Silas Marner	George Eliot
Cranford	Elizabeth Gaskell
The Aspern Papers	Henry James
The Turn of the Screw	Henry James
The Water Babies	Charles Kingsley
The Merry Wives of Windsor	William Shakespeare
The Black Arrow	Robert Louis Stevenson

==== North America ====
Title	Author
The Secret Agent	Joseph Conrad
Nicholas Nickleby	Charles Dickens
The Three Musketeers	Alexandre Dumas
Just So Stories	Rudyard Kipling
Twelfth Night	William Shakespeare
Tristram Shandy	Laurence Sterne
Treasure Island	Robert Louis Stevenson
The Prince and the Pauper	Mark Twain
Around the World in Eighty Days	Jules Verne
The Happy Prince and Other Tales	Oscar Wilde

==== France ====
Title	Author
Eugénie Grandet	Honoré de Balzac
Le Petit Chose	Alphonse Daudet
Trois contes	Gustave Flaubert
Claude Gueux	Victor Hugo
Ramuntcho	Pierre Loti
Le Horla	Guy de Maupassant
La Vénus d'Ille	Prosper Mérimée
La Petite Fadette	George Sand
Les Révoltés de la Bounty	Jules Verne
Micromégas	Voltaire
