= KT =

KT, kT or kt may refer to:

== Arts and media ==
- Karlstads-Tidningen, a Swedish newspaper released in Karlstad
- Knight (chess), a board game piece (as used in notation)
- KT (film), a 2002 Japanese political thriller
- KT Bush Band, group formed by musician Kate Bush

== Businesses and organizations ==
- AirAsia Cambodia (IATA code KT)
- Birgenair (IATA code KT), a former Turkish charter airline company with headquarters in Istanbul, Turkey
- Kataller Toyama, a football club in Japan
- Kensington Temple, a Pentecostal church in west London, UK
- Koei Tecmo, a holding company created in 2009 by the merger of Japanese video game companies Koei and Tecmo
- KT Corporation, a telecommunications company in South Korea, formerly Korea Telecom

== People ==
- Krzysztof Teodor Toeplitz (active mid-late 20th century), dissident Polish journalist known as K.T., brother of film educator Jerzy Toeplitz
- KT Manu Musliar (born 1934), Indian Islamic scholar, orator, and writer
- K. T. McFarland (born 1951), American government official and political commentator
- K. T. Oslin (1942–2020), American country music singer and songwriter
- K.T. Sankaran (born 1954), Indian judge
- KT Sullivan, American singer and actress
- KT Tunstall (born 1975), Scottish singer-songwriter

== Places ==
=== Europe ===
- KT postcode area, UK, covering south west London and north Surrey in England
- Kastoria, Greece (vehicle plate code KT)
- Kitzingen, Germany (vehicle plate code KT)
- Kutina, Croatia (vehicle plate code KT)
- Tarnów, Poland (vehicle plate code KT)

=== Elsewhere ===
- Christmas Island, an Australian territory in the Indian Ocean with the NATO country code KT
- Katy, Texas, formerly known as the "KT stop" on the Kansas-Texas-Missouri railroad line
- Kuala Terengganu, a city in Malaysia
- East Kalimantan, Indonesia (vehicle registration prefix KT)

== Science and technology ==
=== Geology ===
- Cretaceous–Paleogene extinction event, abbreviated K-T or K-Pg event, a mass extinction of species about 66 million years ago
- K–Pg boundary, formerly K-T boundary, the transition between the Cretaceous and Paleogene eras

=== Physics and chemistry ===
- Kt, karat or Carat, in analyzing gold alloys
- kT (energy), in physics, used as a scaling factor for energy values in molecular-scale systems
- Kilotesla (kT), a unit of magnetic flux density
- Kiloton (kt), a measure of energy released in explosions
- motor torque constant (K_{T})
- Knot (unit), a unit of velocity (although "kn" is the preferred symbol)
- Kosterlitz–Thouless transition in statistical mechanics

=== Vehicles ===
- Kriegstransporter, a series of World War II German merchant ships (KT 1 - KT 62), such as KT 3
- King Tiger, a German tank designed during World War II
- KT for Krylatyj Tank, the Antonov A-40 tank, also nicknamed the "flying tank" or "winged tank"

=== Other uses in science and technology ===
- Kaituozhe (rocket family), which uses the prefix KT
- Kardashev scale, used to rank an advanced civilization's level of technology
- Klippel–Trénaunay syndrome, a medical condition
- Kotlin, a programming language for the Java virtual machine

== Titles ==
- Knight Bachelor (Kt), part of the British honours system
- Knight of the Thistle (KT), a member of the Order of the Thistle
- Knight Templar, top degree of York Rite system - freemansory

== Other uses ==
- Kennitala (kt.), the Icelandic identification number
- Knowledge transfer

== See also ==
- Kati (disambiguation)
- Katie
- Katy (disambiguation)
