= Katy (series) =

Set of novels by Susan Coolidge

- What Katy Did; What Katy Did at School; What Katy Did Next; Clover; In the High Valley
- Author: Susan Coolidge
- Illustrator: Addie Ledyard; Jessie McDermot
- Country: United States
- Language: English
- Genre: Children's
- Publisher: Roberts Brothers
- Published: 1872–1890
- Media type: Print
- No. of books: 5

The Katy series is a set of novels by Sarah Chauncey Woolsey, writing under the pen-name of Susan Coolidge. The first in the series, What Katy Did, was published in 1872 and followed the next year by What Katy Did at School. What Katy Did Next was released in 1886. Two further novels, Clover (1888) and In the High Valley (1890), focused upon other members of the eponymous character's family. The series was popular with readers in the late 19th century.

The series was later adapted into a TV series entitled Katy in 1962, and two films, one also called Katy in 1972 and What Katy Did in 1999.

== Novels ==
- What Katy Did (1872)
- What Katy Did at School (1873)
- What Katy Did Next (1886)
- Clover (1888)
- In the High Valley (1890)

== Adaptations ==
- Katy (TV series, 1962)
- Katy (film, 1972)
- What Katy Did (film, 1999)
- Katy (retelling by Jacqueline Wilson, 2015)
- Katy (TV series based on Wilson's retelling, 2018)

== Literary criticism ==
Critics are divided about how much the series played into period gender norms and often compare the series to Little Women. Foster and Simmons argue for its subversion of gender in their book What Katy Read: Feminist Re-Readings of ‘Classic’ Stories for Girls by suggesting the series “deconstructs family hierarchies”.

== Influence ==
The series is unusual for its time by having an entry which focuses not on the family life at home but at school in What Katy Did at School.

In a 1995 survey, What Katy Did was voted as one of the top 10 books for 12-year-old girls.

== See also ==
- Sarah Chauncey Woolsey
