= Catty (disambiguation) =

The catty is a traditional Chinese unit of mass.

Catty may also be:

- Catty (singer) (born 1997), a Welsh singer and songwriter
- the nickname of Catasauqua, Pennsylvania, a borough in the US
- an informal term for a catapult
- an adjective meaning either:
  - pertaining to cats
  - characterised by spiteful behaviour (see passive aggressiveness)
- Catty Nebulart, a character in the anime metaseries Gall Force

== See also ==
- Katty (disambiguation)
- Catti
- Kattie, disambiguation page
- Catie
- Kati (disambiguation)
