= Kath =

Kath or KATH may refer to:

- Kath (city), the historical capital of Khwarezm
- Kath (name), a list of people and fictional characters with the given name or surname
- KATH-TV, the NBC TV station in Juneau, Alaska
- KATH (AM), a radio station in Texas
- Ethan Kath, a Canadian musician

== See also ==
- Cath (disambiguation)
- Kathi (disambiguation)
