= George Cathie =

George Cathie may refer to:

- George Cathie (footballer, born 1876) (1876–1958), Australian rules footballer with Melbourne
- George Cathie (footballer, born 1905) (1905–1967), Australian rules footballer with Hawthorn
