= Tomás Vodanovic =

Chilean politician and sociologist

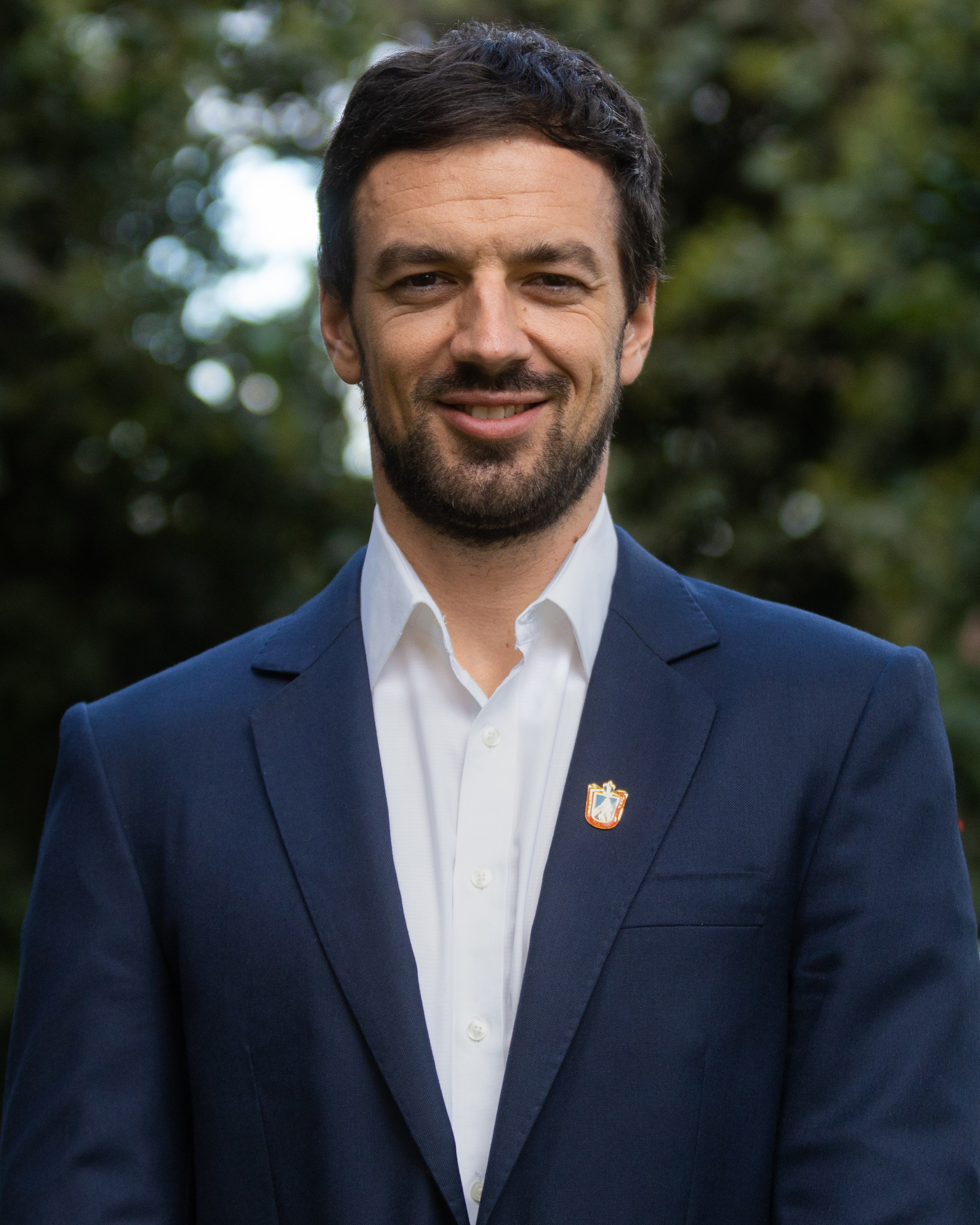
- Vodanovic in 2023

Mayor of Maipú
- Incumbent
- Assumed office 28 June 2021
- Preceded by: Cathy Barriga

Personal details
- Born: 15 October 1990 (age 35) Santiago, Chile
- Party: Broad Front (since 2024)
- Other political affiliations: Democratic Revolution (2017–2024)
- Education: Pontifical Catholic University of Chile; Georgetown University
- Profession: Sociologist

Tomás Vodanovic Escudero (born 15 October 1990) is a Chilean sociologist and politician who has served as mayor of Maipú since 2021. A member of the Broad Front party, Vodanovic is considered an ally of former president Gabriel Boric.

He was re-elected in the 2024 municipal elections, obtaining 70% of the vote and more than 227,000 ballots in his favor against Enrique Bassaletti, becoming the elected mayor with the highest number of votes in Chilean history.

Before entering politics, Vodanovic volunteered in non-governmental organizations (NGOs) focused on strengthening education in vulnerable communities, which inspired his later political work. In 2017, he joined Democratic Revolution, where he served as territorial chief for deputy Pablo Vidal and later as his chief of staff (2018–2020).

== Early life and education ==
Born in Santiago, he is the son of Jaime Vodanovic and María Isabel Escudero. He studied at Cumbres School in Las Condes, and earned a degree in sociology from the Pontifical Catholic University of Chile. He later completed the Global Competitiveness Leadership Program at Georgetown University, attending on a scholarship granted for his volunteer experience.

At age 20, Vodanovic founded the NGO Formando Chile, which he led for eight years, promoting equal access to education. Between 2015 and 2017, he collaborated with the foundation Enseña Chile as a History and Geography teacher at the Carlos Prats School in Huechuraba and the School of Graphic Industry in San Miguel.

In late 2020, he resigned from his position in Congress and ran for the mayoralty of Maipú through the Broad Front coalition's primaries. After winning, he became the coalition's official candidate in the 2021 municipal elections, defeating incumbent Cathy Barriga with 90,284 votes.

== Mayor of Maipú (2021–present) ==
Vodanovic officially assumed office on 28 June 2021 at the age of 30. His administration began with an institutional restructuring and budget cuts to address the financial deficit inherited from Barriga’s term, which he managed to stabilize by 2022. He prioritized social investment and public safety, coordinating anti-crime efforts with the Ministry of the Interior and the Undersecretariat for Crime Prevention.

As part of his security agenda, on 27 July 2023 Vodanovic ordered the permanent closure of the nightclub Espacio Don Óscar, which had been linked to several criminal incidents, including multiple homicides. He also oversaw police operations that partially cleared the informal settlement Toma Vicente Reyes following the high-profile discovery of the body of Venezuelan lieutenant Ronald Ojeda.

In 2023, his administration invested 12 billion Chilean pesos in the SMAPA Development Plan, constructing eight new wells in the Lautaro, Ciudad Satélite, Cerrillos, San Juan, Santa Adela, El Tranque, and El Almendral sectors, reducing chronic water leaks and service disruptions. His government also repaired major roads such as Avenida Pajaritos, Camino a Rinconada, Avenida Borgoño, and Avenida Lumen, and amended the Municipal Regulatory Plan to prevent the construction of high-density "vertical ghettos".

Vodanovic has promoted the expansion of Maipú’s primary healthcare network, inaugurating facilities such as the CESFAM Dr. Salvador Allende and the Michelle Bachelet High-Resolution Primary Emergency Care Service (SAR), along with new mental health centers and municipal pharmacies.

In 2025, Vodanovic inaugurated the Lo Errázuriz Community Mental Health Center (COSAM Lo Errázuriz) in Maipú, representing an investment of more than 842 million Chilean pesos and directly benefiting over 50,000 residents, strengthening the mental health network across the Santiago Metropolitan Region.

That same year, President Gabriel Boric announced in his Public Account the extension of the Santiago Metro Line 6 toward the west sector of Maipú —an initiative long advocated by Vodanovic and his municipal administration. The mayor described the announcement as "a necessary and historic step", highlighting it as the result of nearly four years of joint work between the municipality, residents, and national authorities, as well as a demonstration of the government’s political will to address a long-standing territorial debt.

The extension is expected to benefit more than 300,000 inhabitants of the neighborhoods of Esquina Blanca, Riesco Central, Pajaritos Sur, Templo Votivo, Hospital–Campos de Batalla, Portal del Sol, Parque Tres Poniente, and Pehuén, reducing travel times by up to an hour and a half and significantly improving connectivity and quality of life in the area.

In addition, his administration launched the Plan Maipú Ciudad 2030, a long-term urban modernization strategy focused on enhancing connectivity, promoting sustainable development, and delivering better public services for the community.

== Personal life ==
Vodanovic lives in the commune of Ñuñoa, in the city of Santiago.
