= Catherine Beck =

Catherine Beck may refer to:

- Cathie Beck (born 1955), American author
- K. K. Beck (born 1950), Katherine Beck, American novelist
- Kathryn Beck (born 1986), Australian actress
- Katie Beck (born 1982), American curler
