= Katy (TV series) =

British children's television miniseries

- Based on: Katy by Jacqueline Wilson; What Katy Did by Susan Coolidge
- Written by: Tom Bidwell
- Directed by: John McKay
- Country of origin: United Kingdom
- No. of series: 1
- No. of episodes: 3

Production
- Producer: Jonathan Wolfman

Original release
- Network: CBBC
- Release: 13 March – 27 March 2018

Katy is a British television adaptation of Katy by Jacqueline Wilson, which is a modern retelling of What Katy Did by Susan Coolidge. It first aired on the CBBC Channel on 13 March 2018.

The series follows the Wilson novel with some minor tweaks:

- Dorry and Jonnie are absent, and Phil is five instead of two in their absence.
- Mr Robinson is instead Ms Robinson.
- Izzie and Dad are not married, and instead engaged and announce their marriage.
- Helen is the physiotherapist, and she works in the hospital.

== Cast ==
- Chloe Lea as Katy
- Letty Butler as Izzie
- Simon Trinder as Dad
- Bea Glancy as Elsie
- Imogen Chadwick as Cecy
- Jasmine De Goede as Eva Jenkins
- Rachel Watson as Clover Carr
- Ruth Madeley as Helen
- Jack Carroll as Dexter
- Max True as Ryan
- Liz Hume Dawson as Nurse Jasmine
- Pauline Jefferson as Mrs. Burton

== Plot synopsis ==
Katy Carr is an 11-year old tomboyish girl in a blended family, who is having trouble getting along with her stepmother, Izzy. After a bad fall, she learns to adapt to being in a wheelchair, whilst coping with the transition between primary and secondary school.

== Production and reception ==
The series was commissioned by CBBC in June 2017. Katy won two Children's BAFTAs: Best Young Performer for Chloe Lea and Best Writer for Tom Bidwell. Katy was also nominated for Best Drama Series

Letty Butler won a Children's BAFTA for her role as Izzy.
