= Kathiawari =

Kathiawari or Kathiawadi may refer to:

- something of, from, or related to the Kathiawar peninsula in Gujarat, India
- Kathiawari dialect, a variety of the Gujarati language
- Kathiawari (horse), a horse breed
- Kathiawadi cattle, a breed of cow
- Kathiawari cuisine, a variety of Gujarati cuisine
- Kathiawadi Memons, subgroup of the Memon Muslims from Kathiawad
- Gangubai Kothewali or Gangubai Kathiawadi, Indian madam (pimp)
  - Gangubai Kathiawadi, 2023 Indian biographical film about her by Sanjay Leela Bhansali

== See also ==
- Kathi (disambiguation)
- Kishtwari, a dialect of Kashmiri
- Saurashtra (disambiguation)
