= Katty =

Katty is a given name. Notable people with the name include:

- Katty Barry (1909–1982), Irish restaurateur
- Katty Besnard, singer and guitarist of the Plastiscines
- Katty Fuentes (born c. 1976), Mexican beauty pageant winner
- Katty García (born 1988), Ecuadorian theater and television actress
- Katty Kay (born 1964), English journalist
- Katty Kowaleczko (born 1964), Chilean actress of Polish ancestry
- Katty Martínez (born 1998), Mexican footballer
- Katty Piejos (born 1981), French handball player
- Katty Santaella (born 1967), Venezuelan judoka

== See also ==
- Kattie, a disambiguation page
- Catty
- Katy (disambiguation)
