= Kąty =

Location of places called Kąty in Poland

Kąty may refer to any of the following places:

== Greater Poland Voivodeship (west-central Poland) ==
- Kąty, Jarocin County
- Kąty, Leszno County
- Kąty, Rawicz County
- Kąty, Słupca County

== Lesser Poland Voivodeship (southern Poland) ==
- Kąty, Brzesko County
- Kąty, Gorlice County
- Kąty, Nowy Targ County
- Kąty, Proszowice County

== Lublin Voivodeship (eastern Poland) ==
- Kąty, Biłgoraj County
- Kąty, Gmina Kodeń, Biała County
- Kąty, Gmina Wilków, Opole County
- Kąty, Ryki County

== Łódź Voivodeship (central Poland) ==
- Kąty, Kutno County
- Kąty, Łask County
- Kąty, Pajęczno County
- Kąty, Radomsko County
- Kąty, Wieluń County
- Kąty, Wieruszów County

== Masovian Voivodeship (east-central Poland) ==
- Kąty, Gmina Sobienie-Jeziory
- Kąty, Ciechanów County
- Kąty, Mińsk County
- Kąty, Otwock County
- Kąty, Piaseczno County
- Kąty, Sochaczew County
- Kąty, Węgrów County

== Podlaskie Voivodeship (north-eastern Poland) ==
- Kąty, Kolno County
- Kąty, Łomża County
- Kąty, Mońki County
- Kąty, Siemiatycze County

== Elsewhere in Poland ==
- Kąty, Gmina Brześć Kujawski, Kuyavian-Pomeranian Voivodeship (north-central Poland)
- Kąty, Gmina Lubień Kujawski, Kuyavian-Pomeranian Voivodeship (north-central Poland)
- Kąty, Subcarpathian Voivodeship (south-eastern Poland)
- Kąty, Staszów County, Świętokrzyskie Voivodeship (south-central Poland)
- Kąty, Włoszczowa County, Świętokrzyskie Voivodeship (south-central Poland)
- Kąty, Elbląg County, Warmian-Masurian Voivodeship (northern Poland)
- Kąty, Kętrzyn County, Warmian-Masurian Voivodeship (northern Poland)
- Kąty, West Pomeranian Voivodeship (north-western Poland)
- Kąty Wrocławskie, Lower Silesian Voivodeship (south-western Poland)

== See also ==
- Katy (disambiguation)
