= Kathy =

Kathy is a feminine given name. It is often short for other names.

Kathy may refer to:

== People ==
=== In sports ===
- Kathy Bald (Born 1963), Canadian freestyle swimmer
- Kathy Fedorjaka (born 1968), American basketball coach
- Kathy May (Born 1956), American tennis player
- Kathy Radzuweit (Born 1980), German volleyball player
- Kathy Smallwood-Cook (Born 1960), British Olympic athlete
- Kathy Sheehy (Born 1970), American water polo player
- Kathy Tough (Born 1969), Canadian volleyball player
- Kathy Watt (Born 1964), Australian female cycle racer
- Kathy Weston (Born 1958), American middle distance runner
- Kathy Foster (basketball) (Born 1960), Australian basketball player

=== In television and film ===
- Kathy Bates (Born 1948), American actress and director
- Kathy Burke (Born 1964), British actress
- Kathy Chow (1966–2023), Hong Kong actress and singer
- Kathy Garver, American television, stage, screen, and voice actress
- Kathy Greenwood (Born 1962), Canadian comedian and actress
- Kathy Griffin (Born 1960), American stand-up comedian
  - Kathy (TV series), a talk show hosted by Griffin
- Kathy Hilton (Born 1959), American actress, celebrity and socialite
- Kathy Long (Born 1964), American actress, kickboxer and mixed martial arts fighter
- Kathy Najimy (born 1957), American actress, comedian, director, writer, producer and activist
- Kathy Staff (1928–2008), British actress born in Dukinfield, Cheshire, England, United Kingdom
- Kathy Yuen, better known as Tong Yee, actress from Hong Kong

=== In music ===
- Kathy Foster (musician), American musician
- Kathy Kirby (1938–2011), British singer
- Kathy Leander (Born 1963), Swiss singer
- Kathy Linden (Born 1938), American pop singer
- Kathy Mattea (Born 1959), American country singer
- Kathy Valentine (Born 1959), American bassist for the all-girl pop band The Go-Gos
- Kathy Young (Born 1945), American pop singer

=== In politics ===
- Kathy Cox (born 1964), American politician
- Kathy Desjardin, American politician
- Kathy Hochul (born 1958), American politician
- Kathy Shaw, American politician
- Kathy Stanton (active since 2000), Sinn Féin Member of the Northern Ireland Assembly in North Belfast
- Kathy Sullivan (Australian politician) (born 1942), Australian politician
- Kathy Watanabe, American elected official of Santa Clara
- Kathy Whitmire (born 1946), American politician
- Kathy Wolfe Moore (born 1957), American politician
- Ahmed Kathrada (1929–2017), South African politician

=== In literature ===
- Kathy Acker, American sex-positive feminist writer
- Kathy Evans (1948–2003), English journalist and women's right activist
- Kathy Jetnil-Kijiner, poet from Marshall Islands
- Kathy Lette, (born 11 November 1958), British author
- Kathy Shaidle, Canadian author, columnist, poet and blogger
- Kathy Stinson, Canadian children's writer
- Kathy Tyers, American author
- Kathy Sierra, author of Head First programming tutorial series, blogger, and game developer

=== In other fields ===
- Kathy Bonney (died 1987), American murder victim
- Kathy Butterly (born 1963), American sculptor
- Kathy Ireland (born 1963), American model
- Kathy Rudy (born 1956), American women's studies scholar and theologian
- Kathy Slade (born 1966), Canadian artist
- Kathy Vivas (born 1972), Venezuelan astrophysicist

== Fictional characters ==
- Kathy Anderson, a character in the popular American TV and radio sitcom Father Knows Best
- Kathy Barnes, a character in the long-running Channel 4 soap opera Hollyoaks
- Kathy Beale, a character in the British soap opera EastEnders
- Kathy Carter, a character in the 1959–1964 Marvel comic book Kathy
- Kathy Reilly, a character in the 2019 Millarworld comic series Chrononauts: Futureshock
- Kathy Seldon, a character in the 1952 film Singin' in the Rain
- Kathy, a character from Barney & Friends played by Lauren King
- Kathy, a character in TV sitcom Friends, played by Paget Brewster

== Songs about Kathy ==
- Kathy's Song by Paul Simon
- "Kathy's Waltz" by The Dave Brubeck Quartet from the album Time Out
- "Kathy with a K's Song" by Bright Eyes from the album Oh Holy Fools

== See also ==
- Catherina (and similar spellings)
- Käthy (horse)
