= Kattie =

Kattie may refer to:

- Kattie B. Screws, formerly name of Katherine Jackson
- Kattie, nickname of Australian author Katharine Susannah Prichard
- Kattie, a character in The Bookshop (film)
- The Kattie, American ship used by Albert Gallatin

== See also ==
- Katty (disambiguation)
- Catty (disambiguation)
