= Kath (name) =

Kath is both a given name (often a short form of Katherine, Kathleen, etc.) and a surname. Notable people with the name include:

== Given name ==
- Katherine Kath Bloom (fl. 1970s–present), American singer-songwriter whose sad voice often accompanies simple folk melodies
- Kath Hughes, British actress and comedian
- Kathleen Kath Pettingill (born 1935), the matriarch of a notorious Melbourne based criminal family
- Kath Shelper, 21st century Australian film producer
- Katherine Kath Soucie (fl. 1991–present), American voice actress

== Surname ==
- Katherine Kath (1920–2012), French ballerina and actress
- Kory Kath (born 1977), American politician
- Roger Kath (born 1984), Hong Kong footballer
- Terry Kath (1946–1978), original guitarist, vocalist, and founding member of the band Chicago

== Fictional characters ==
- Kath Day-Knight, in the Australian television comedy series Kath & Kim

== See also ==
- Cath (disambiguation)
