= Katydid (disambiguation) =

Katydid is the common name in America for insects of the family Tettigoniidae, including

- Pseudophyllinae, a subfamily of Tettigoniidae
  - Pterophylla camellifolia - a North American katydid species with the common name of "common true katydid"

Katydid may also refer to:

- Katydids (band), an English pop and rock band
- USS Katydid (SP-95), a United States navy patrol boat
- McDonnell TD2D Katydid, a United States navy target drone
- Denison Katydids, a minor league baseball team
- A pseudonym used by Kate Slaughter McKinney

== See also ==
- Katydid sequence, a number sequence
- Katydid Books, a publisher
