= Cathy Sisler =

American artist

Cathy Sisler is an American artist, born in Wisconsin.

Since 1965, she has been living in Newfoundland. She is a musician, writer and a touring performance artist.

In 1997, her piece Lullaby for the Almost Falling Woman, concerning a woman seeking employment and experiencing a series of falls, won Prix de jury at the festival du Cinéma et des Nouveaux Médias. Her 1994 film Mr B. presented Sisler herself in drag as a man.

She is a member of English/French language female performance art group, Groupe Intervention Video.

Her name appears in the lyrics of the Le Tigre song "Hot Topic."
