= Josephine Heffernan =

Irish nurse

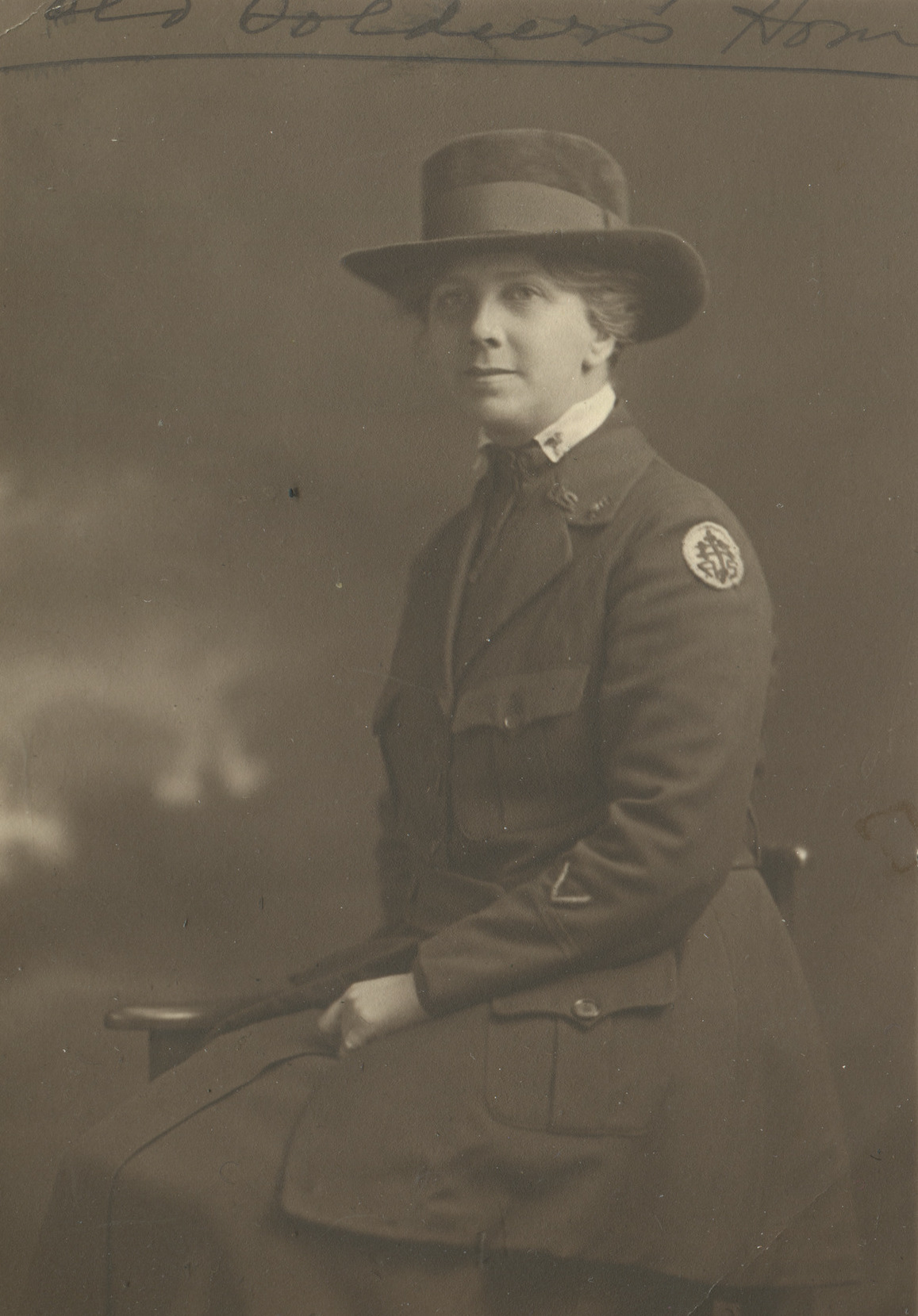
- Born: 11 March 1876; Dublin, United Kingdom
- Died: 1962; Bray, Republic of Ireland
- Occupation: Registered Nurse
- Years active: 1913–1935
- Known for: Chief Nurse U.S. Army Nurse Corps

Josephine E. Heffernan (11 March 1876 – 1962) was an Irish-American nurse who served during the First World War. She was born in Dublin and immigrated to the US in 1906, where she joined the United States Army in 1913. She served as a nurse in California and Mississippi, before being stationed at the American hospital at Rimaucourt, France. After the war, Heffernan went on to see service in China, the Philippines, and Pearl Harbor.

In 2002, a bracelet belonging to Heffernan was discovered by a schoolboy in Rimaucourt, who enlisted the aid of his teacher to return the piece to Heffernan's family. The efforts to identify Heffernan and return the bracelet were the subject of a 2017 film documentary which first aired in January 2018.

== Early life ==
Josephine Heffernan was born in Dublin to John Heffernan, who worked as a baker, and Christine Allen. Her family later moved to Bray after her father's death. There she worked as a book-keeper. Heffernan emigrated to the United States in 1906.

== Career and later life ==
Heffernan joined the United States Army Nurse Corps in 1913. In 1917, she became the chief nurse at a hospital at Fort McDowell on Angel Island in California. She was later transferred to Camp Shelby near Hattiesburg, Mississippi. She arrived to find Shelby in a state of emergency, with 240 patients and facing shortages of both supplies and staff. She recalled:

We all worked together. Nurses during those days did not spare labor. Meanwhile, time-slips, hadn't any use for them. Nurses stayed on duty until relieved by others ... Marvelous what one can do when emergency calls.

In 1918, Heffernan was appointed Chief Nurse of U.S. Army Base Hospital No. 59 at the army's Rimaucourt Hospital Center. After the First World War, Heffernan continued her career in the Army Nurse Corps at stations in the U.S., China, the Philippines, and Hawai'i. In 1920, she was appointed to the rank of second lieutenant, the basic rank for nurses.

Heffernan retired in 1935, and moved back to Bray in 1943. She never married or had children. Heffernan died in 1962.

== Bracelet ==
Whilst working in the American hospital, Heffernan lost a bracelet with her name engraved. The bracelet was found in 2002 by an eight-year-old in a garden in Rimaucourt, who asked his teacher for help in locating the owner and their family. This led to a 15-year-long search to find out more about Heffernan, in order to return the bracelet. The teacher eventually met with Marjorie Desrosier in 2017, an American Nurse Historian who was giving a local talk about nurses in the First World War. They also enlisted the aid of the local Bray Cualann Historical Society.

The search initially started in the US, as Heffernan was believed to be American, but where ancestry records showed that no-one of that name was born in the years 1880 or 1881. The search then widened after she was shown to be of Irish birth. The bracelet was returned to Heffernan's family in 2017. The return of the bracelet was filmed, and the search was covered in a French language documentary Josephine H by France 2, which first aired in January 2018. An exhibition on the discovery of the bracelet was shown at the Yarn storytelling festival in Bray.
