= Cath =

Cath may refer to:

== People ==
- Cath Bishop (born 1971), British former rower and 2003 world champion
- Cath Carroll (born 1960), British musician and music journalist
- Cath Coffey (fl. 1990s–?), one of the earliest members of British rap band Stereo MCs
- Cath Crowley (born 1971), Australian young adult fiction author
- Cath Kidston (born 1958), English fashion designer, businesswoman and author
- Cath Mayo, New Zealand short story writer, novelist and musician
- Cath Rae (born 1985), Scottish field hockey goalkeeper
- Cath Vautier (1902–1989), New Zealand netball player, teacher and sports administrator
- Cath Wallace (born 1952), New Zealand environmentalist and academic

== In mythology ==
- Catha (mythology) or Cath, an Etruscan deity
- Cath Palug, a feline creature in Welsh mythology

== Songs ==
- "Cath...", a Death Cab for Cutie song
- "Cath", a hit song by The Bluebells

== Other uses ==
- Cath., abbreviation for Catholic
- Catheter or catheterization
- CATH, protein structure classification
- Cathinone, usually a specific substituted cathinone drug.

== See also ==
- Kath (disambiguation)
