= K. T. Manu Musliar =

Indian Islamic scholar and orator

K.T. Manu Musliyar
- Born: 1934; Karuvarakundu, Kerala, India
- Died: 1 February 2009 (aged 74–75); Calicut, Kerala, India
- Occupation: Islamic Scholar

K.T. Mohammed Musliyar, who was known as K.T. Manu Musliyar was an Islamic scholar, orator, and writer and General Secretary of Samastha Kerala Islam Matha Vidyabhyasa Board, which is one of the biggest educational organisation in Kerala. He also was a great leader of Samastha Kerala Jamiyyathul Ulama.

== Career ==
Musliyar became a member of the Central Mushawara of Samastha Kerala Jam-iyyathul Ulema in 1974. He quickly rose to become an office secretary, and finally a joint secretary for the organization.

== Death ==
He died of a heart attack on 1 February 2009 at Calicut during the golden jubilee celebrations of Samastha Kerala Jam'iyyathul Mu'allimeen were being held. He was aged 75 at the time of his death. He was buried the next day at the qabarstan of Darunnajath Islamic Centre Juma Masjid at Karuvarakundu, his hometown.
