= Cathy Hackl =

American futurist, author, and speaker

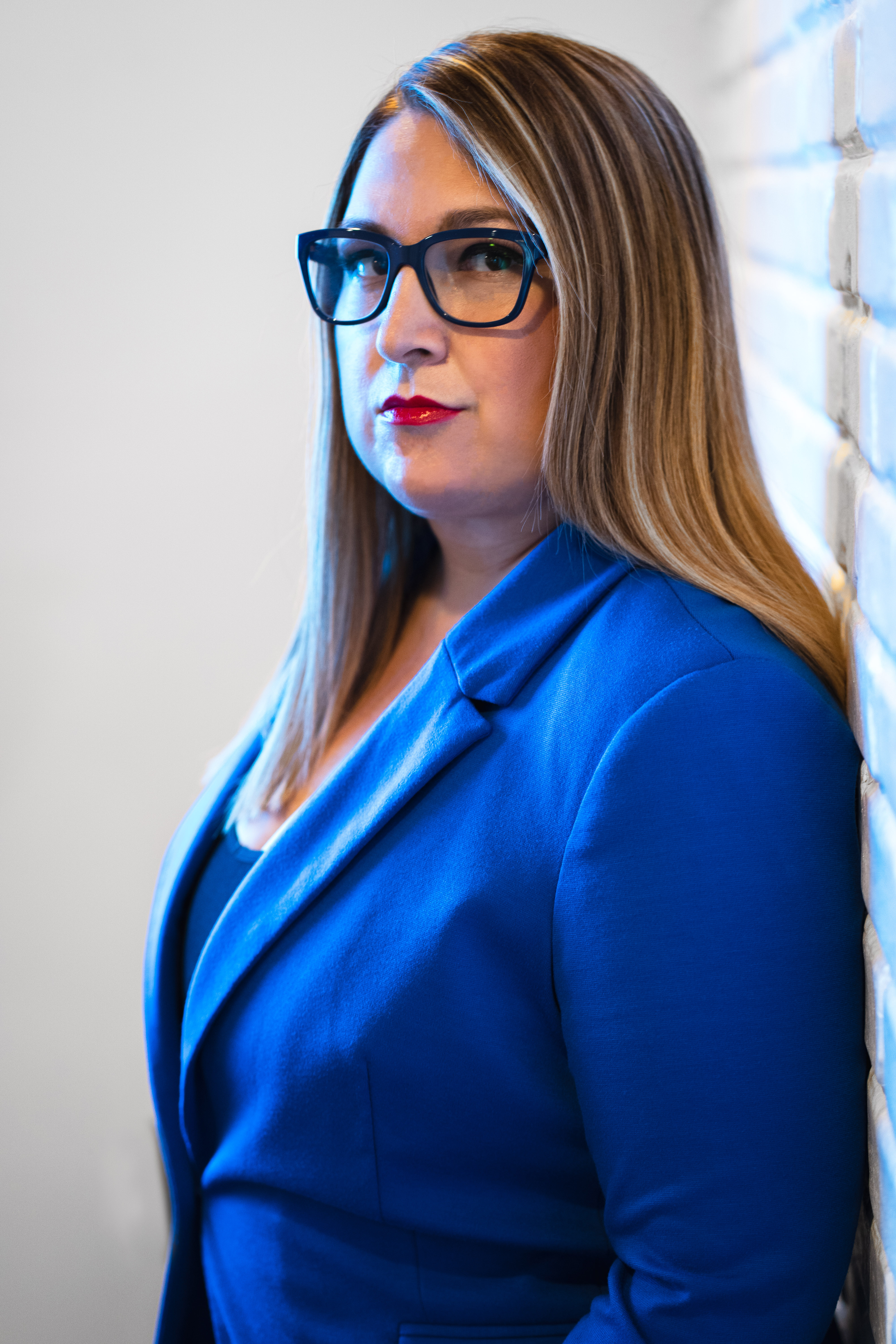
- Education: The University of Texas at Austin
- Occupations: writer, chief executive officer, journalist
- Website: https://www.cathyhackl.com/

Cathy Hackl is a Costa Rican-American futurist and author. Self-proclaimed the "Godmother of the Metaverse", she has researched and consulted on the metaverse, video games, Web3, and augmented reality. Hackl's firm conviction about the significance of the Metaverse has had to be tempered when metaverse products did not gain market traction in the global north, as predicted. The Metaverse however, remained popular in South Africa, Nigeria, and Egypt, as venture capital's investments have shifted to generative AI.

== Career ==
In 2017, Hackl began her career in the field of technology and the dissemination of augmented reality, at HTC Vive. She then joined the Magic Leap team, and by 2021, she had already launched her own business. She currently disseminates her findings and contributions in media outlets such as The Wall Street Journal, WIRED and Forbes.

She is currently the CEO of Futures Intelligence Group, a company dedicated to research and consulting for businesses such as Clinique and P&G on strategic topics related to non-fungible tokens, better known as NFTs, video games, and virtual fashion. In addition to research, Hackl disseminates metaverse topics through two podcasts: Adweek's Metaverse Marketing and Future Insiders, dedicated to marketing and web trends enthusiasts.

== Publications ==
- G. Wolfe, S., Hackl. C. 2017. Marketing New Realities: An Introduction to Virtual Reality & Augmented Reality Marketing, Branding & Communications
- Buzzell, J., Hackl, C. 2021. The Augmented Workforce: How AI, AR and 5G Will Impact Every Dollar You Make
- Hackl, C., Lueth, D., Di Bartolo, T. 2022. Navigating the Metaverse: A Guide to Limitless Possibilities in a Web 3.0 World, U.S. Wiley

=== Noteworthy ===
Hackl has the distinction of being the first physical and virtual person to ring NASDAQ's opening bell with her digital twin (physical and avatar form) on TV and open the financial markets.
