= Cathy Barriga =

Chilean politician

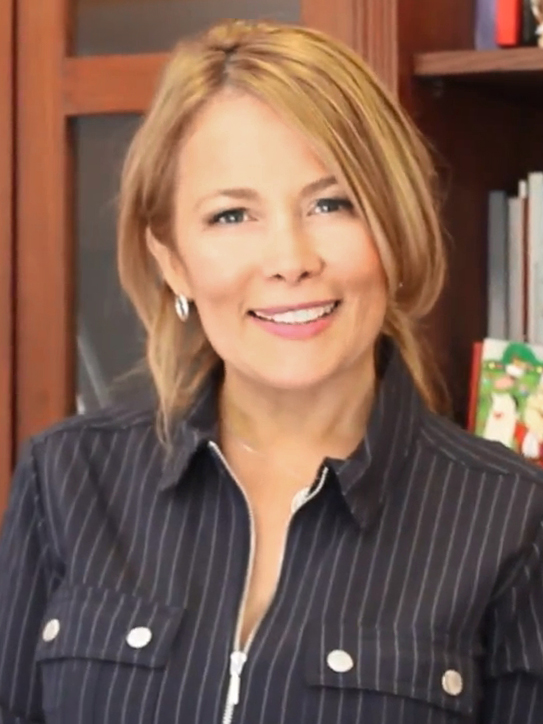
- Barriga in 2016

Mayor of Maipú
- In office 6 December 2016 – 28 June 2021
- Preceded by: Christian Vittori
- Succeeded by: Tomás Vodanovic

Personal details
- Born: 9 April 1973 (age 53) Santiago, Chile
- Party: Independent Democratic Union
- Spouse(s): Joaquín Lavín León (2009–present)
- Children: Three
- Relatives: Joaquín Lavín (father-in-law)
- Education: Santo Tomás University (BA)
- Occupation: Politician
- Profession: Psychologist

Cathy Carolina Barriga Guerra (born 8 April 1973, née Catherine Carolina Barriga) is a Chilean television figure, licensed psychologist, politician, and adult content creator who served as mayor of Maipú from 2016 to 2021. In January 2024, she was charged with fraud against the Treasury and falsification of public instruments, causing her to be placed under house arrest while the investigation continues.
