= Kathy Fedorjaka =

American basketball coach

Personal information
- Born: November 16, 1968 (age 57)

Career information
- College: Fairfield (1986–1990)
- Coaching career: 1993–2012

Career history

Coaching
- 1993-94: Connecticut College
- 1994-97: Bloomsburg Huskies
- 1997-2012: Bucknell Bison

Kathaleen "Kathy" Fedorjaka (born October 16, 1968) was the head women's basketball coach at Bucknell University. In 15 seasons at Bucknell, she posted a 209–211 record. She owns an overall 276–249 record. She also coached at Connecticut College and Bloomsburg. In 2003, she led Bucknell to its first ever NCAA tournament appearance, after a 21–10 mark. In 1998, she was named the Patriot League Coach of the Year. Kathy Fedorjaka has also led her team to the NCAA's again in 2008 but losing to the North Carolina Tar Heels.

== Playing career ==
Fedorjaka graduated from Fairfield University in 1990 where she was a four-year member of the basketball team. Fedorjaka served as co-captain during her senior season when she averaged 12.7 points per game. In addition, Fedorjaka was named to the MAAC All-Academic Team, received the Fairfield Scholar Athlete of the Year Award, and was presented the ECAC Medal of Merit Award. As a sophomore in 1987–88, Fedorjaka helped lead the Stags to the first NCAA tournament appearance in school history.

== Head coaching record ==
Record table
Season	Team	Overall	Conference	Standing	Postseason
Connecticut College (New England Small College Athletic Conference) (1993–1994)
1993–94	Connecticut College	16–8			
Connecticut College:		16–8 (.667)			
Bloomsburg Huskies (Pennsylvania State Athletic Conference) (1994–1997)
1994–95	Bloomsburg	14–11			
1995–96	Bloomsburg	17–11			
1996–97	Bloomsburg	20–8			
Bloomsburg:		51–30 (.630)			
Bucknell Bison (Patriot League) (1997–2012)
1997–98	Bucknell	12–14	6–6	4th	
1998–99	Bucknell	13–14	8–4	2nd	
1999-00	Bucknell	15–15	8–4	2nd	
2000–01	Bucknell	20–8	9–3	2nd	
2001–02	Bucknell	21–10	11–3	2nd	NCAA first round
2002–03	Bucknell	13–15	7–7	4th	
2003–04	Bucknell	15–14	7–7	5th	
2004–05	Bucknell	10–18	4–10	7th	
2005–06	Bucknell	18–11	10–4	T-2nd	
2006–07	Bucknell	20–11	12–2	1st	WNIT First Round
2007–08	Bucknell	16–16	8–6	5th	NCAA first round
2008–09	Bucknell	16–12	8–6	3rd	
2009–10	Bucknell	7–21	3–11	8th	
2010–11	Bucknell	11–17	7–7	T-4th	
2011–12	Bucknell	2–15	3–11	7th	
Bucknell:		209–211 (.498)	90–56 (.616)		
Total:		276–249 (.526)	90–56 (.616)		
National champion Postseason invitational champion Conference regular season champion Conference regular season and conference tournament champion Division regular season champion Division regular season and conference tournament champion Conference tournament champion
