= Ray Heffernan =

Ray Heffernan may refer to:

- Ray Heffernan (cricketer) (1935–2014), Australian cricketer
- Ray Heffernan (hurler), Irish hurler
- Ray Heffernan (songwriter), Irish songwriter who co-wrote the 1997 Robbie Williams song "Angels"
