= Kathie Dello =

American science communicator

Kathie D. Dello
- Born: Wellsville, New York
- Education: University of Albany; Oregon State University
- Scientific career
- Workplaces: Oregon State University

Kathie D. Dello is an American science communicator and the Director of State Climate Office of North Carolina. She looks to understand and explain the weather and climate in North Carolina using research, education and outreach. Dello provides regular environmental commentary to the media.

== Early life and education ==
Dello is from Wellsville, New York. She studied meteorology as an undergraduate degree at University at Albany. Dello had originally considered a job as a meteorologist, but became increasingly interested in climate change and how it impacts people. She remained there for her postgraduate degree in geography, before moving to Oregon State University as a doctoral student. Dello completed her PhD in environmental sciences at Oregon State University.

== Research and career ==
Dello served as Deputy Director of the Oregon Climate Service and Associate Director of the Oregon Climate Change Research Institute (OCCRI) at Oregon State University. Here she worked on impact analysis and policy for adaptation. Dello managed climate communications, as well as serving on the Oregon Water Supply Availability Committee and Drought Readiness Council. Dello has criticised the lack of action to mitigate climate change.

"My generation—the millennials—watched while we passed legislation to address acid rain, and signed global agreements to fix the ozone hole. We thought that surely we'd be able to fix climate change, especially since we knew we were the cause. Three decades later, sadly, we haven't been able to do that. We don't need any more reports or assessments detailing the problem despite massive disinformation campaigns meant to undermine scientific credibility. We need to talk solutions. We know it's real. We know it's us. I still have hope"

In 2019 Dello was first woman to be appointed Director of the State Climate Office of North Carolina. The State Climate Office looks to understand the weather and climate in North Carolina, and engages in research, education and outreach. In this capacity she manages a team of climate service specialists as well as coordinating projects with K-12 students and a $1.7 million budget. The North Carolina Environment and Climate Observing Network (ECONet) collects climate observations and data. She serves on the North Carolina Environmental Quality (NCDEC) Climate Science Advisory Panel. She has warned about the risks that people in North Carolina face if they do not reduce their emissions.
