= Kati (disambiguation) =

Kati is a commune and town in Koulikoro, Mali.

Kati may also refer to:

== People ==
- Kati or Kata people of Pakistan and Afghanistan
- Kati (given name), a list of people with the name
- James Kati (1924–2006), South African politician and anti-apartheid activist
- Mahmud Kati (1468?–1552 or 1593), African Muslim Songhai scholar

== Geography ==
- Kati Province, Kenya
- Kati Cercle, an administrative subdivision of the Koulikoro Region of Mali
  - Kati, Mali, capital of Kati Cercle
- Kati (Tanzanian ward), a word meaning "ward"
- Kati District, Unguja South Region, Tanzania
- Kati, Arusha, an administrative ward in Arusha Region, Tanzania

== Other uses ==
- Kati language (disambiguation)
- Catty or kati, an East Asian measure of weight
- Kati (book series), a Swedish novel series by Astrid Lindgren, also the protagonist of the series
- KATI, an FM radio station in California, Missouri
- KATI (Wyoming), a former AM radio station in Casper, Wyoming
- Kati roll, an Indian street-food dish

== See also ==
- Kati kati (food)
- Kadi (disambiguation)
- Katy (disambiguation)
- Katty (disambiguation)
- Cati (disambiguation)
- Catty (disambiguation)
