= Cathy Saldaña =

Philippine architect

- Born: August 9, 1966 (age 60); Philippines
- Education: University of the Philippines
- Occupation: Architect
- Organization: pdp + Architecture
- Website: pdparch.com

Cathy Saldaña Siegel (born August 9, 1966) is a registered architect and master planner based in Makati, Philippines. She is a prominent advocate for women in the Philippine architecture industry. Saldaña is the owner and managing director of pdp + Architecture in the Philippines and is one of the pioneers for sustainable island and resort developments in the country. She serves as the American Institute of Architects (AIA) International Country representative and is a United Architects of the Philippines (UAP) fellow.

== Early life and education ==
She pursued her early education at Miriam College (formerly Maryknoll College) in Quezon City, Philippines. Influenced by her father, who worked as an engineer in public housing for the National Housing Authority, Saldaña's interest for architecture began with her early exposure to the construction industry.

Saldaña earned her Bachelor of Architecture degree from the University of the Philippines College of Architecture in 1990. She also holds a Master's degree in Management from the Asian Institute of Management.

== Career ==
Saldaña is the owner and managing director of pdp + Architecture PH, a firm she founded in 1992. In 2010, she was a director and part owner of ArcoGroup, Inc., but later shifted her focus to her own practice in 2018. She is a partner in the Philippines branch of Weave Collaboration Partner, an architectural outsourcing company and also serves as CEO for Collaboration Authority, an engineering and architectural services company based in Makati, Philippines.

Aside from being an advocate for women in the field of architecture, Saldaña is also focused on sustainability and is a certified Green Building Professional by the U.S. Green Building Council (USGBC). Her practice remains at the forefront of sustainable architectural design in the Philippines.

Her commitment to advancing women in the industry lead her to co-chair the Women's Leadership Initiative-Philippines. Additionally, Saldaña was selected by the United Architects of the Philippines (UAP) to be the Philippine correspondent to the Union of International Architects Women in Architecture Committee (UIA WIA) and was elevated as a UAP Fellow in April 2019. Additionally, PDP Architects with her leadership, is recognized as one of the few women-led architectural firms in the Philippines, overseeing a large number of female-led projects.

=== Notable projects ===
Cathy’s notable projects include the Drift Beach Club in Dumaguete, I-Land Residences in Cloverleaf, Seda Lio in El Nido, Palawan. Additionally, she has been involved in airport projects for Ayala Land, and various projects by Marriott Hotels. Her project, the Diamond Tower in Damosa Land, Davao City was awarded Best Architecture Design for an Office Tower from the 2019 Philippine Property Awards.

== Personal life ==
In 2016, Cathy married Alex Siegel in Cambridge, Massachusetts. She currently resides in Makati with her husband and two Golden Retrievers, Smith and Wesson.
