= Katty García =

Ecuadorian actress (born 1988)

- Born: 1988 (age 36–37); Manta, Ecuador
- Occupation: Actress
- Years active: 2009–present
- Children: 1

Katty García (born 1988) is an Ecuadorian theater and television actress, who played the role of Beverly in the telenovela 3 familias of Ecuavisa.

== Theatre ==
- Toda esta larga noche
- Ay mamá
- Hola, soy tu vagina
- Tres Familias

== Television ==
- Historias personales
- El exitoso Lcdo. Cardoso
- Aída
- La Pareja Feliz 5
- Vivos
- 3 Familias
