= Maipú, Chile =

Commune in Santiago, Chile

Maipú
- Commune
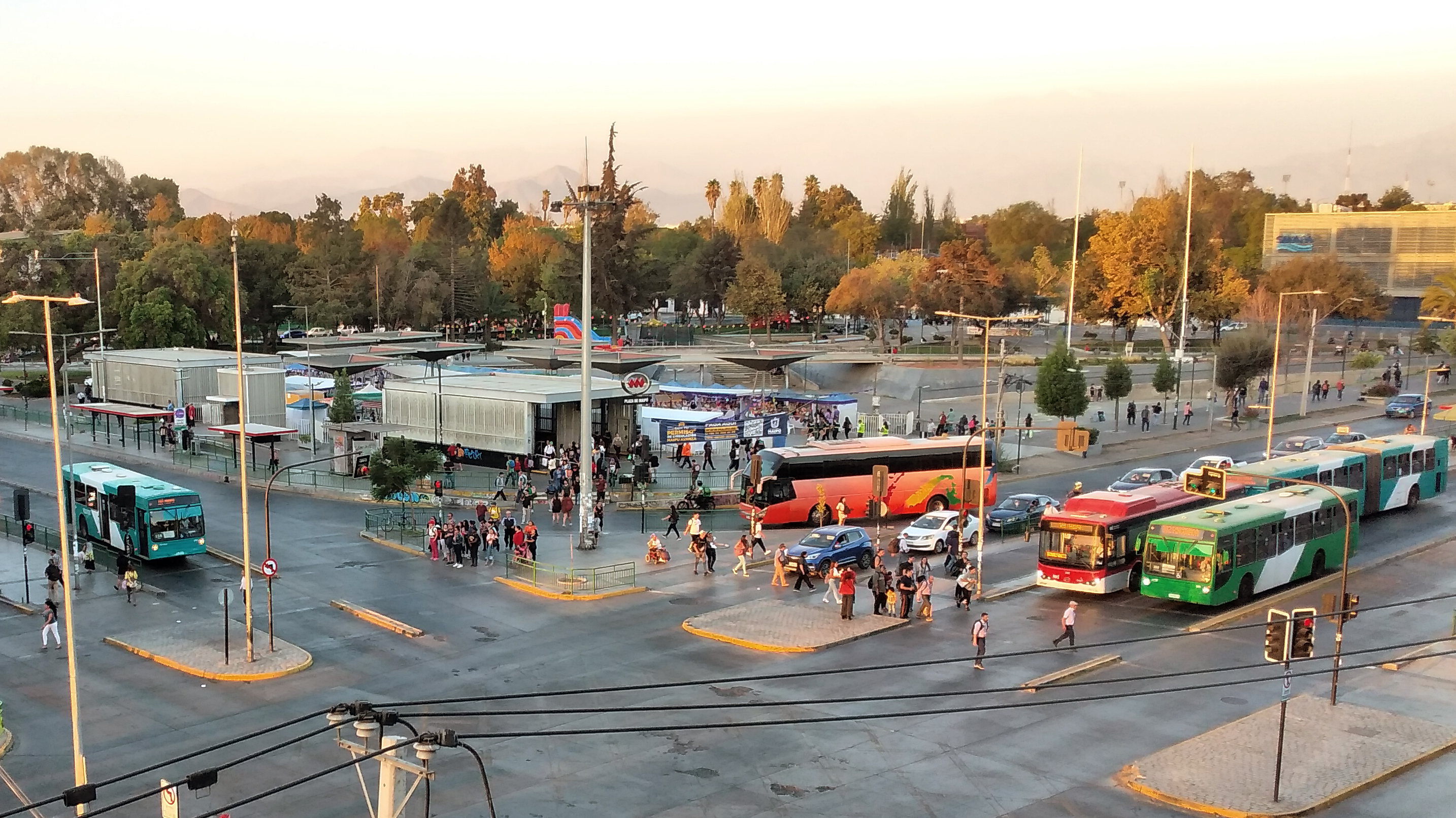
- Maipú Square in 2023

- Flag Coat of arms Map of Maipú within Greater Santiago Location in Chile
- Coordinates (city): 33°31′S 70°46′W
- Country: Chile
- Region: Santiago Metropolitan Region
- Province: Santiago

Government
  - Type: Municipality
  - Mayor: Tomás Vodanovic (FA)

Area
  - Commune: 133.0 km^{2} (51.4 sq mi)

Population (2024)
  - Commune: 503,635
  - Density: 3,787/km^{2} (9,808/sq mi)
  - Urban: 501,023
  - Rural: 2,612
- Time zone: UTC-4 (CLT)
  - Summer (DST): UTC-3 (CLST)
- Area code: 56 +
- Website: Municipality of Maipú

Maipú is a commune in the Santiago Province in the Santiago Metropolitan Region in Chile, forming part of the Greater Santiago conurbation. It was founded on 16 February 1821 and is historically significant as the site of the Battle of Maipú (5 April 1818), where Chile's independence was consolidated. With a population of 503,635, Maipú is the 2nd most populous commune in the country and is predominantly inhabited by a middle-class population.

== Neighborhoods ==
In June 2026, the municipality began renovating the streets of The Embrace neighborhood, starting with the repaving of Judea street. Two months later, Judea Park also underwent an upgrade, including the replacement of 31 LED lights.

== Demographics ==
As of the 2024 census, the population is 503,635, of which 47.8% are males, and 52.2% are females. People aged under 15 years old make up 16.1% of the population, and people aged 65 years old and over make up 14.1%. 99.5% of the population is urban and 0.5% is rural.

Historical population

Year	Pop.	±% p.a.
1875	3,832	—
1885	3,870	+0.10%
1895	5,047	+2.69%
1907	5,685	+1.00%
1920	6,619	+1.18%
1930	8,509	+2.54%
1940	12,903	+4.25%

Year	Pop.	±% p.a.
1952	19,958	+3.70%
1970	44,733	+4.59%
1982	114,117	+8.12%
1992	256,550	+8.44%
2002	468,390	+6.20%
2017	521,627	+0.72%
2024	503,635	−0.50%

Source: INE, Memoria Chilena

- Average annual household income: US$45,664 (PPP, 2006)
- Population below poverty line: 9.1% (2006)
- Regional quality of life index: 76.67, mid-high, 21 out of 52 (2005)
- Human Development Index: 0.782, 20 out of 341 (2003)

=== Ethnic minorities ===
As of the 2024 census, Indigenous peoples make up 7.7% of the population, and Afro-Chileans make up 0.8%.

=== Religion ===
As of the 2024 census, 68.0% of the population over 15 years old are Christians (52.5% Catholics, 11.8% Evangelicals or Protestants, and 3.6% other branches), 0.1% are Jews, 0.1% are Muslims, 0.1% are Buddhists, 0.02% are Hinduists, 0.9% are adrehents of other religions, and 30.8% are irreligious.

=== Immigration ===
As of the 2024 census, immigrants make up 6.1% of the population: 5.2% are from South America, 0.8% from North America, 0.1% from Europe, 0.1% from Asia, 0.003% from Africa, and 0.003% from Oceania.

== Administration ==
As a commune, Maipú is a third-level administrative division of Chile administered by a municipal council, headed by a mayor who is directly elected every four years. The 2024-2028 alcalde is Tomás Vodanovic (FA). The communal council had the following members:

- Ka Quiroz Viveros (FA)
- Nicolas Carrancio Fuentes (FA)
- Bladymir Muñoz Acevedo (FA)
- Felipe Farías López (Ind./FA)
- Ariel Ramos Stocker (PC)
- Graciela Arochas Felber (DC)
- Edison Aguilera Salazar (REP)
- Karen Garrido Neira (REP)
- Juan Carlos Prado Chacón (RN)
- Horacio Saavedra (UDI)

Within the electoral divisions of Chile, Maipú is represented in the Chamber of Deputies by Pier Karlezi (PNL), Agustín Romero (REP), Enrique Bassaletti (Ind./REP), Mario Olavarría (UDI), Cristián Contreras (PDG), Marcos Barraza (PC), Gustavo Gatica (Ind.), and Tatiana Urrutia (FA) for the 2026–2030 term, as part of the 8th electoral district. The commune is represented in the Senate by Rojo Edwards (Ind.), Luciano Cruz-Coke (EVO), Manuel Ossandón (UDI), Fabiola Campillai (Ind.), and Claudia Pascual (PC) for the 2022–2030 term, as part of the 6th senatorial constituency (Santiago Metropolitan Region).

== Gallery ==
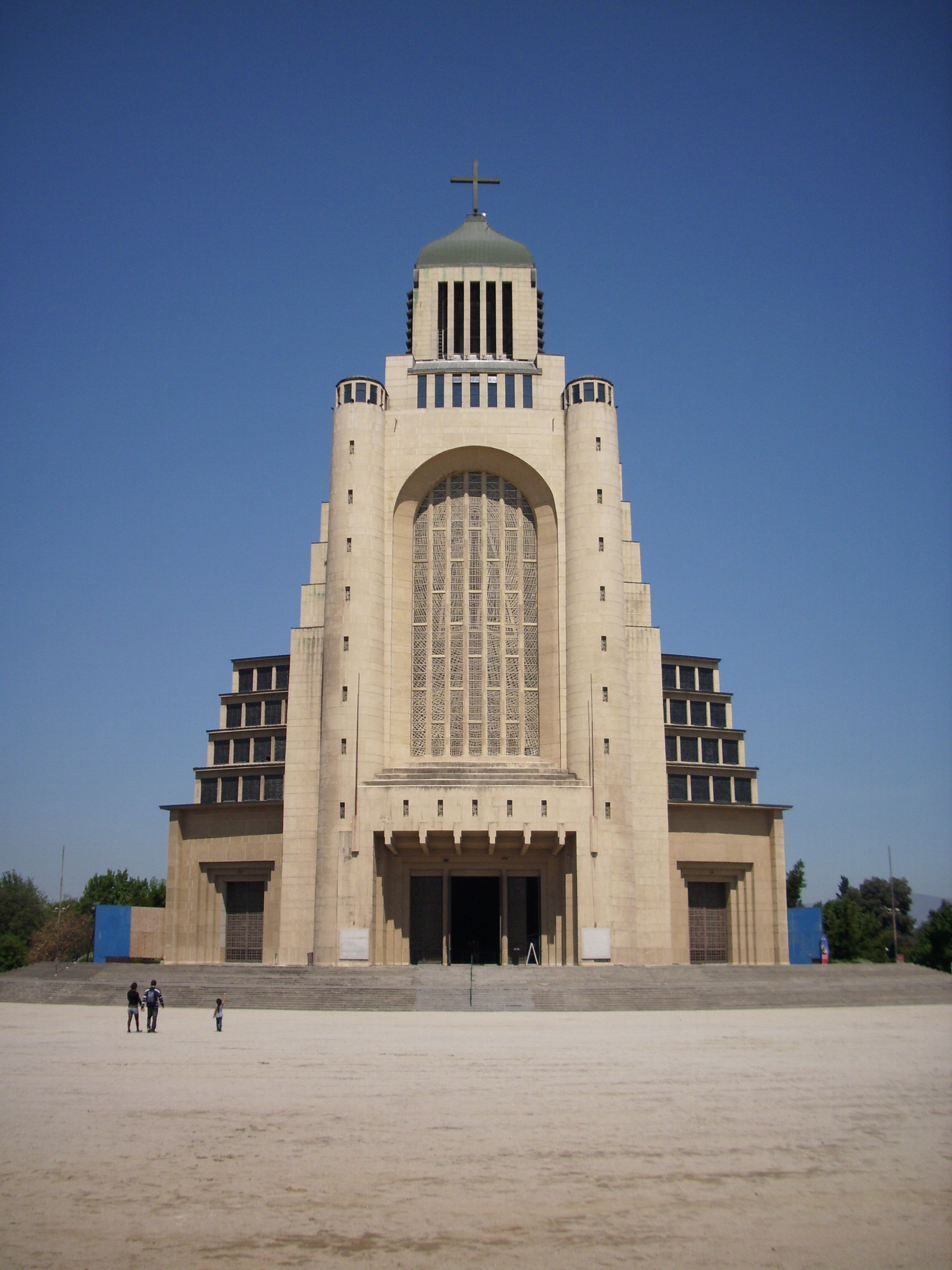
Votive Temple of Maipú

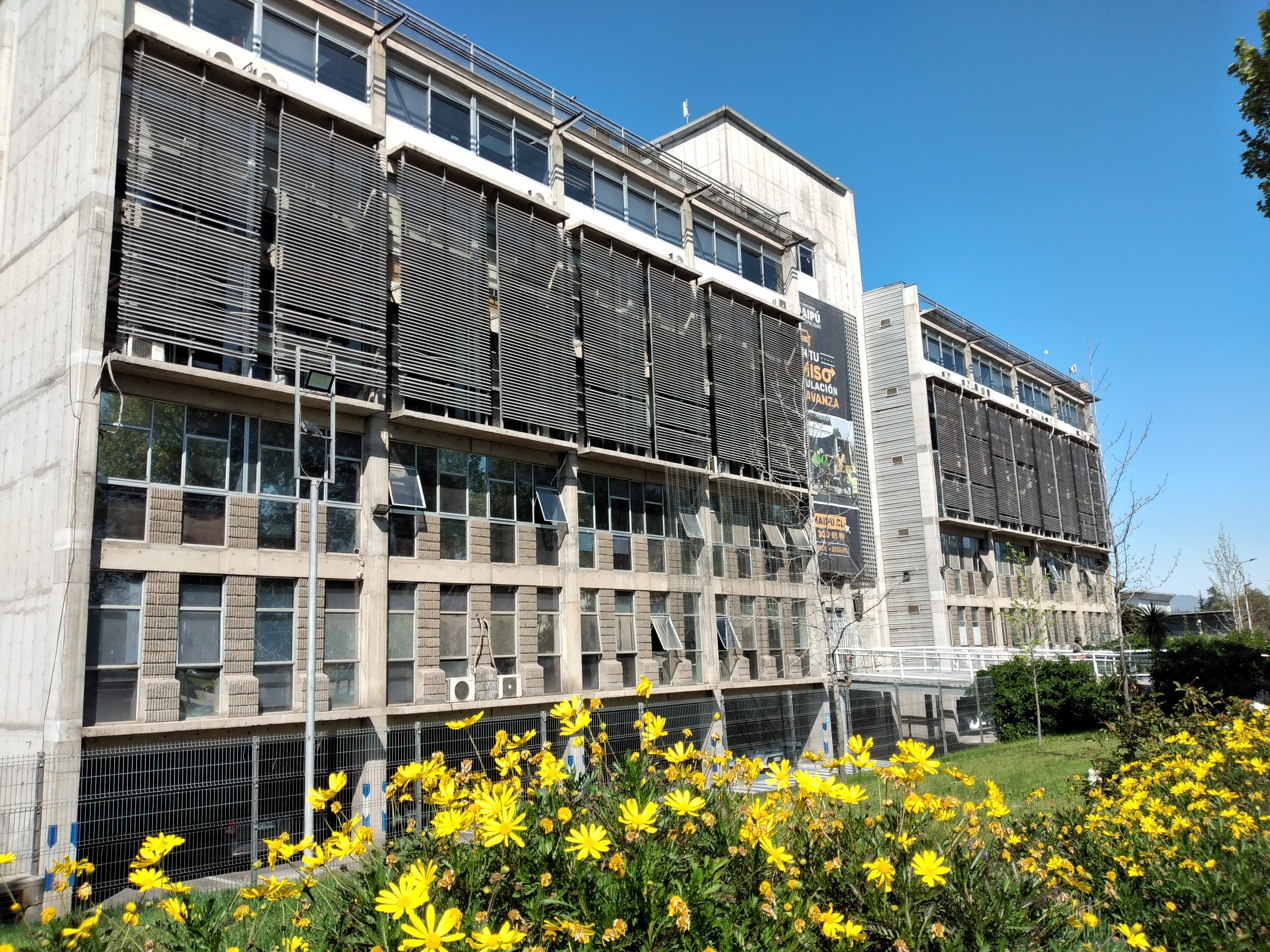
City hall

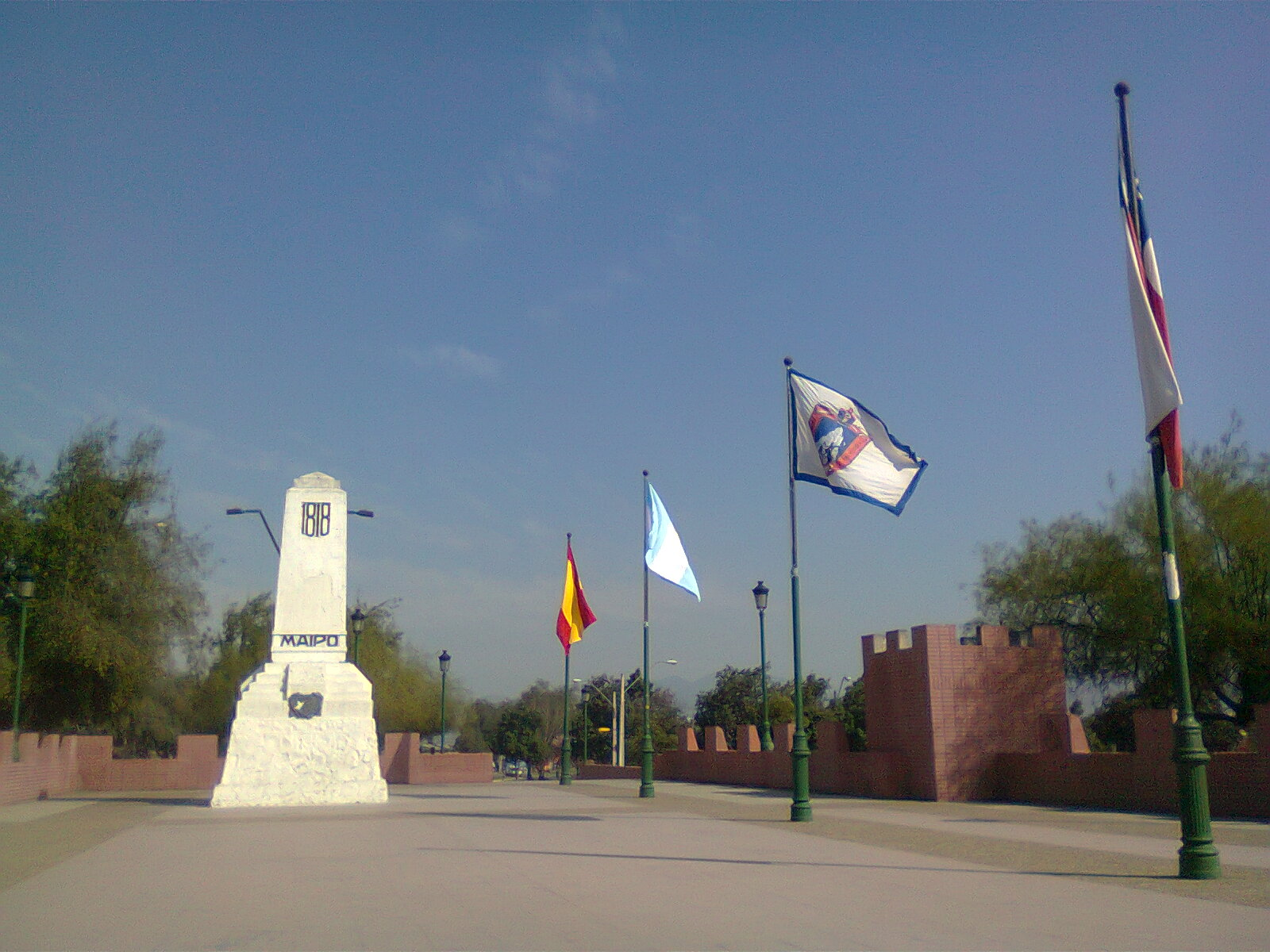
Monument to Maipú Embrace

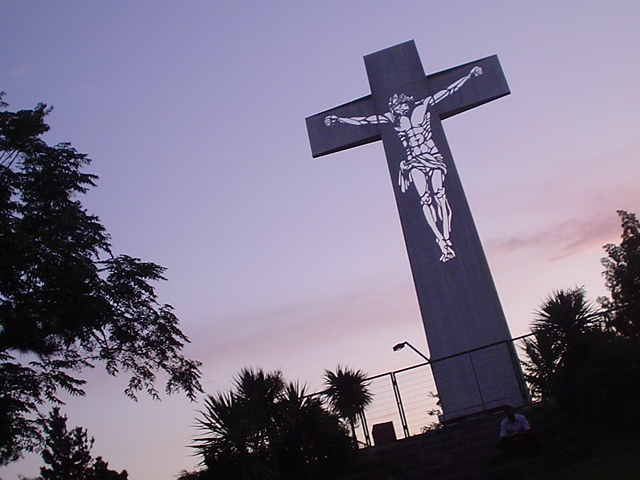
The cross of Primo de Rivera's Hill

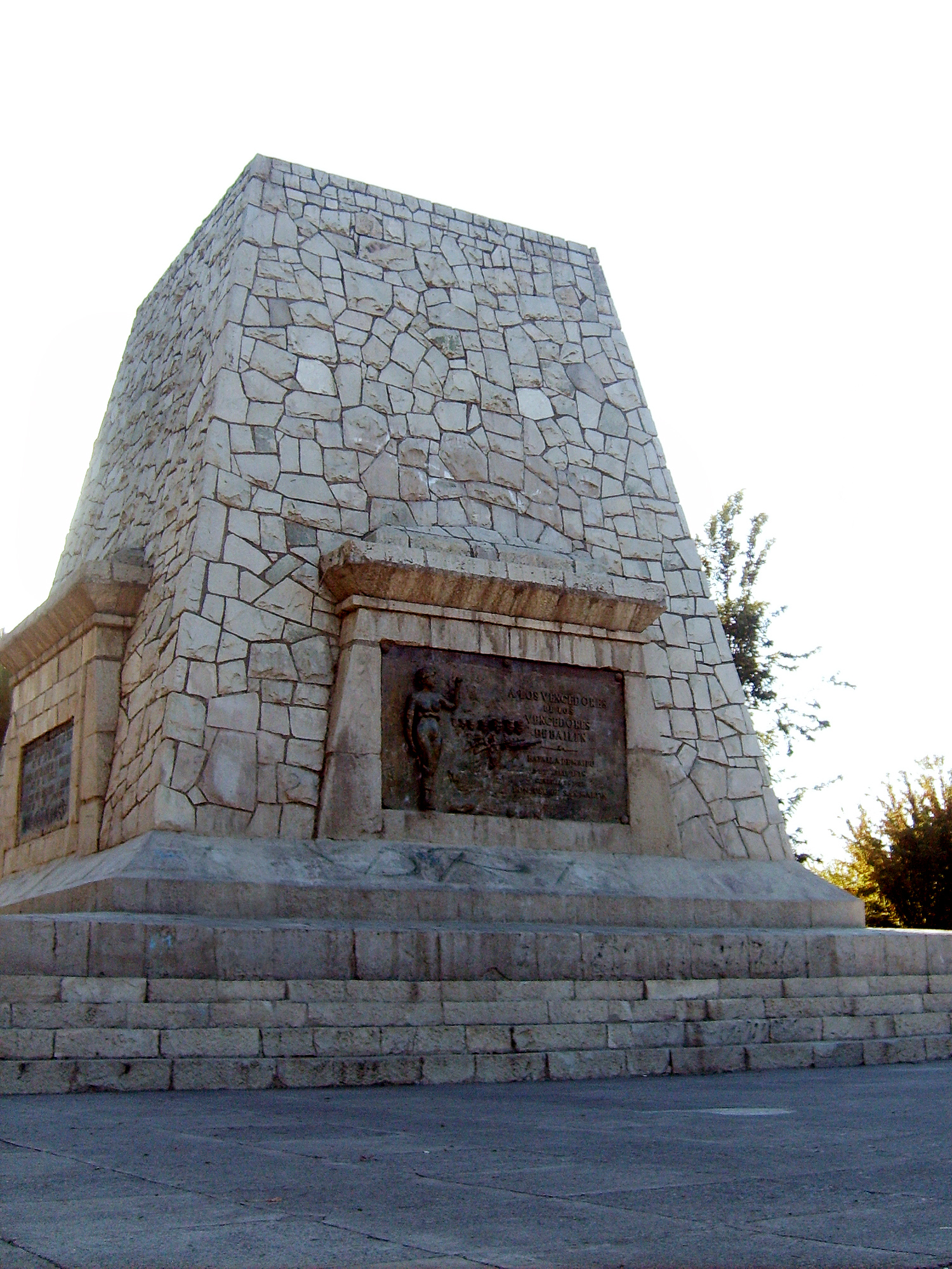
Monument to the Conquerors of the winners of Bailen

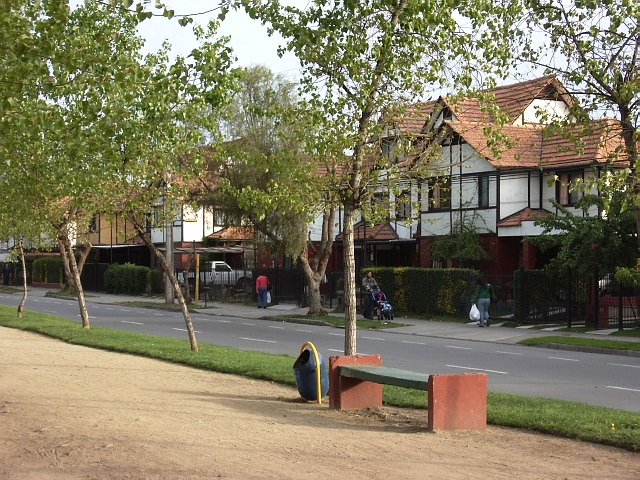
A neighbourhood in Maipu

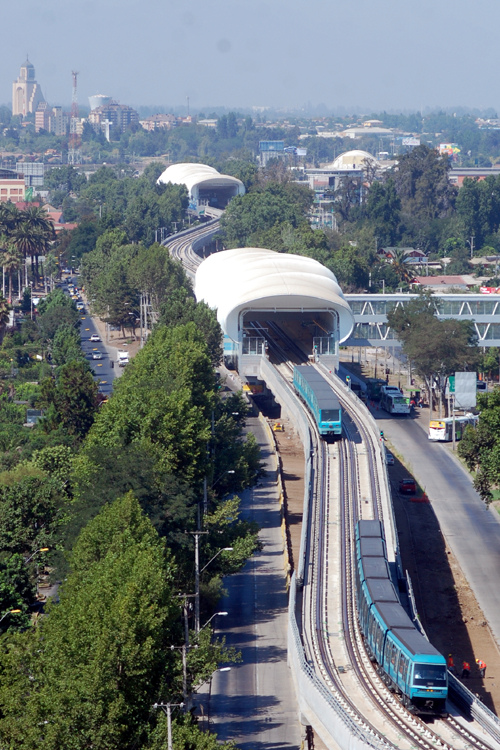
Santiago Metro Line 5

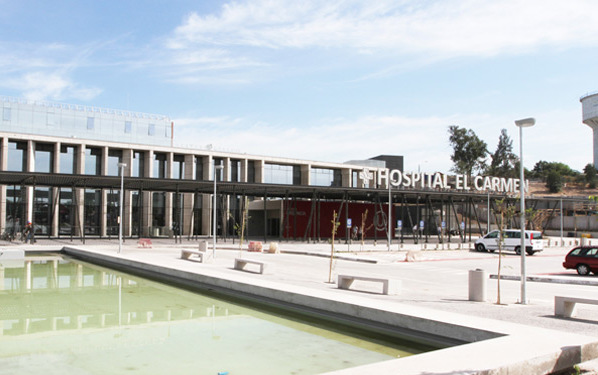
El Carmen Hospital
