= Kathy Watanabe =

American elected official of Santa Clara, California

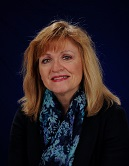
- Website: Kathy Watanabe for Mayor

Kathy Watanabe was the city councilor for District 1 of Santa Clara, California before she termed out in December 2024. She was appointed to the council on March 7, 2016 by a vote of 4-2 by then-current council members, then won the city council election in November 2016 with 48% of the vote to keep her seat. Watanabe served on the Downtown Revitalization Plan, Audit, Facilities Naming and Honorary Recognition Ad Hoc, Police Activities League (PAL) and Santa Clara Sister Cities Association committees.

As part of her council duties, Watanabe served on the following committees: Cities Association of Santa Clara County – Board of Directors (Member), Cities Association of Santa Clara County – Legislative Action Committee (Member), City/School Liaison Committee (Santa Clara Unified School District) (Member), Recycling and Waste Reduction Commission of Santa Clara County (RWRC/Vice Chair), San Jose/Santa Clara Treatment Plant Advisory Committee (TPAC/Vice Chair), San Jose/Santa Clara Clean Water Financing Authority (chair), Santa Clara County Expressway Plan 2040 Policy Advisory Board (PAB).

On December 19, 2017, the Council unanimously voted for Watanabe to serve as Vice Mayor for the City of Santa Clara for 2018.

In June 2018, a judge ordered the City of Santa Clara to district elections and at at-large Mayor. On November 3, 2020, Watanabe was re-elected to the Santa Clara City Council in the District 1 election and won all of the precincts in the district. Upon terming out from City Council on December 2024, Watanabe ran for Santa Clara Unified School District and won the Trustee Area 2 seat with almost 80% of the vote. She was sworn in the same month.
