= Michael Heffernan =

Michael Heffernan may refer to:

- Michael Heffernan (politician) (1885–1970), Irish politician
- Michael Heffernan (hurler) (born 1989), Irish hurler
- Michael Heffernan (academic) (born 1959), historical geographer
- Mike Heffernan, Australian rules footballer
