= John Heffernan =

John Heffernan may refer to:

- John Heffernan (American actor) (1934–2018), American actor
- John Heffernan (British actor) (born 1981), British actor
- John Heffernan (hurler) (born 1963), Irish hurler
- John Heffernan, co-writer of Snakes on a Plane
