= K. T. Sankaran =

Indian judge

Hon'ble Justice K.T. Sankaran
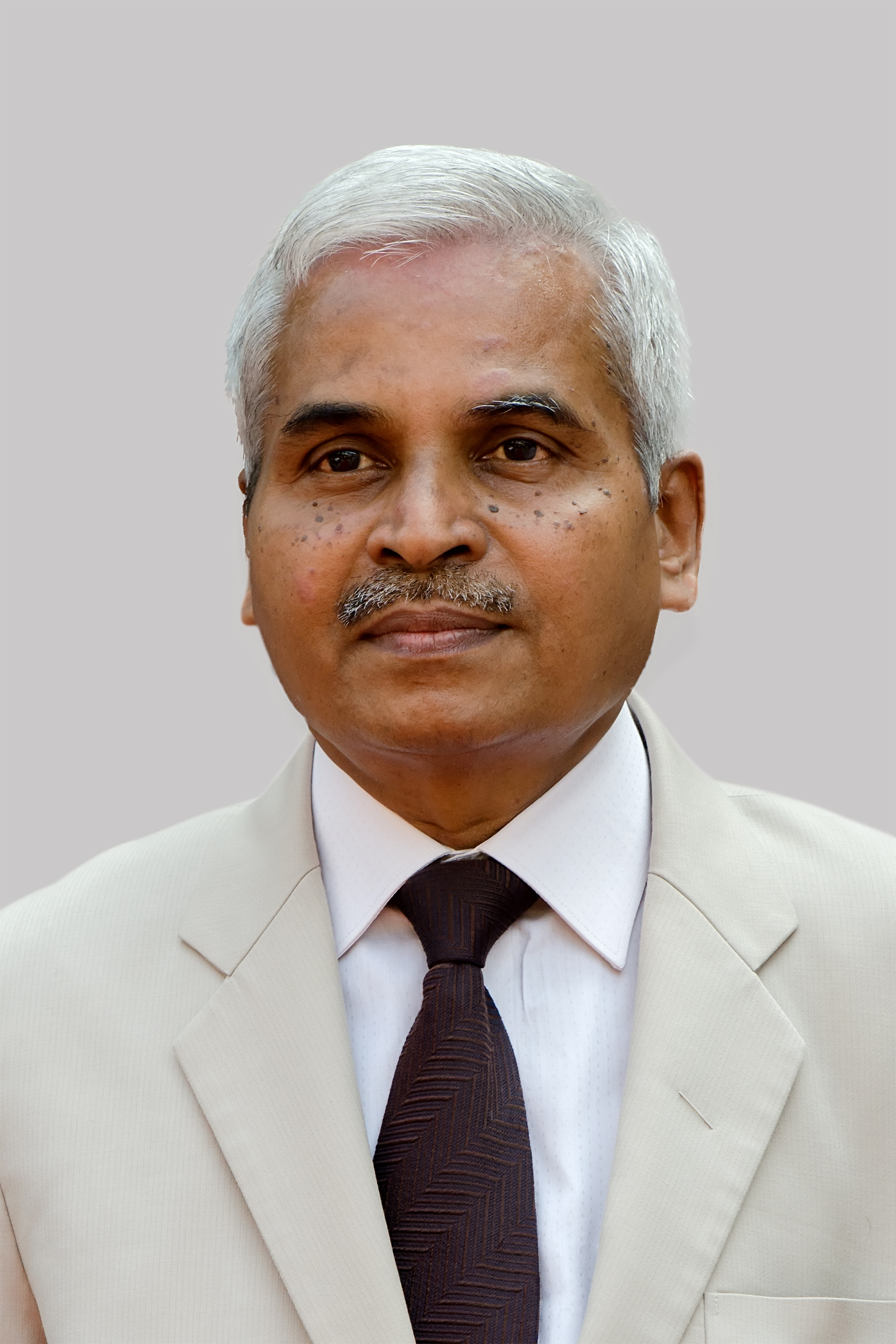

Judge of Kerala High Court
- In office February 2005 – December 2016

Personal details
- Born: 25 December 1954 (age 71) Thalakkasseri, Pattambi, Palakkad, Kerala
- Citizenship: Indian
- Education: Saraswathy Law College, Mercara, Coorg, Karnataka

K.T. Sankaran (born 25 December 1954) is a retired judge of the Kerala High Court, the highest court in the Indian state of Kerala and in the Union Territory of Lakshadweep.

== Early life ==
He was born in Thalakkasseri, near Pattambi, Palakkad, Kerala on 25 December 1954. He completed his education from S.B.S Thanneercode, Government High School, Kumaranellur, St. Thomas College, Thrissur and Sree Krishna College, Guruvayoor, Saraswathy Law College, Mercara, Coorg, Karnataka. He enrolled as an Advocate in 1979.

== Career ==
He started practice in Magistrate Court Pattambi in 1979 and shifted his practice to Kerala High Court in 1982. On 2 February 2005, he was appointed as an additional judge of Kerala High Court and became a permanent judge on 22 November 2006. He retired from service upon attaining superannuation on 25 December 2016. On 5 January 2017, Retd. Justice K. T. Sankaran assumed charge as the first Director (Academics) of Kerala Judicial Academy, the institute for judicial education and legal research established by the honorable High Court of Kerala. He served as the Director till 4 January 2020. Subsequently, the National University of Advanced Legal Studies (NUALS) appointed him as an adjunct professor in February 2020. During his tenure at NUALS, he also launched a channel on YouTube where he published a series of lectures on CPC (Code of Civil Procedure (India)). On 7 November 2022, then Minister of Law and Justice Kiren Rijiju appointed Honorable Justice K. T. Sankaran as a member of the 22nd Law Commission of India. He currently resides in New Delhi serving as a Full-time Member of the commission.
