= Katydid sequence =

Sequence of numbers

The Katydid sequence is a sequence of numbers first defined in Clifford A. Pickover's book Wonders of Numbers (2001).

== Description ==
A Katydid sequence is the smallest sequence of integers that can be reached from 1 by a sequence of the two operations n ↦ 2n + 2 and 7n + 7 (in any order). For instance, applying the first operation to 1 produces the number 4, and applying the second operation to 4 produces the number 35, both of which are in the sequence.

The first 10 elements of the sequence are:

1, 4, 10, 14, 22, 30, 35, 46, 62, 72.

== Repetitions ==
Pickover asked whether there exist numbers that can be reached by more than one sequence of operations. The answer is yes. For instance, 1814526 can be reached by the two sequences 1, 4, 10, 22, 46, 329, 660, 4627, 9256, 18514, 37030, 259217, 1814526 and 1, 14, 30, 62, 441, 884, 1770, 3542, 7086, 14174, 28350, 56702, 113406, 226814, 453630, 907262, 1814526.
