= Kathy Rudy =

American women's studies scholar

M. Kathy Rudy
- Born: 1956 (age 69–70)
- Education: Duke University (MDiv, PhD)
- Occupations: Scholar, author, theologian
- Known for: Social constructionism

M. Kathy Rudy (born 1956) is an American women's studies scholar, and theologian.

== Biography ==
Rudy earned a Master of Divinity from the Duke Divinity School and later a doctorate in ethics from Duke as well. She also taught as a professor at Duke. Her work is often interdisciplinary as she merges philosophy, theology, politics, feminism, and medical ethics. She is open about her homosexuality and is a radical social constructionist. She is an advocate of animal welfare and locavorism.

In Sex and the Church: Gender, Homosexuality and the Transformation of Christian Ethics, Rudy argues for equal treatment of all people based on the "gifts that each one brings", rather than making a societal judgement based on their "real or perceived gender". She further questions the relationship between the Christian community and a person's private life, pushing back on the idea that sexual practices would impact an individual's relationship with God.

Rudy is well known at Duke University, where she taught a variety of topics including: Feminist Ethics, Reproductive Ethics, Gender and Popular Culture, and Debates in Women's Studies. Through her progressive work, Kathy was awarded the David Paletz Course Enhancement Award in 2012.

== Selected publications ==
- Beyond Pro-life and Pro-choice: Moral Diversity in the Abortion Debate (1996). Beacon Press. ISBN 0-8070-0427-8
- Sex and the Church: Gender, Homosexuality and the Transformation of Christian Ethics (1997). Beacon Press. ISBN 0-8070-1034-0
- Loving Animals: Toward a New Animal Advocacy (2011). University of Minnesota Press. ISBN 0-8166-7468X
