= What Katy Did =

1872 children's novel by Sarah Chauncey Woolsey (Susan Coolidge)

- First edition cover
- Author: Susan Coolidge
- Language: English
- Series: The Katy Books
- Genre: Children's literature Coming of age
- Publisher: Roberts Brothers
- Publication date: 1872
- Publication place: United States
- Media type: Print (Hardcover and Paperback)
- Pages: 277 (Little, Brown edition, 1925)
- Followed by: What Katy Did at School
- Text: What Katy Did at Wikisource

What Katy Did is an 1872 children's novel written by Sarah Chauncey Woolsey under her pen name "Susan Coolidge". It follows the adventures of a 12-year-old American girl, Katy Carr, and her family who live in the fictional lakeside Ohio town of Burnet in the 1860s. Katy is a tall untidy tomboy, forever getting into scrapes but wishing to be beautiful and beloved. When a terrible accident makes her an invalid, her illness and four-year recovery gradually teach her to be as good and kind as she has always wanted.

Two sequels follow Katy as she grows up: What Katy Did at School and What Katy Did Next. Two further sequels relating the adventures of Katy's younger siblings were also published—Clover and In the High Valley. There is also a short story about the Carr children, Curly Locks, in a collection called Nine Little Goslings. The books were frequently reprinted and all are available online.

Coolidge modeled Katy on her own childhood self, and the other 'Little Carrs' on her brothers and sisters. The title is a play on the katydid, a family of insects – which explains the insects on the first-edition book cover.

== Plot summary ==
12-year-old Katy Carr lives with her widowed father, two brothers, and three sisters in Burnet, a small Midwestern American town. Her father is a doctor who works long hours. As a consequence, the children are mostly in the care of his strict sister Aunt Izzie. Katy often gets into trouble with Aunt Izzie.

She behaves somewhat kindly to the children and dreams of some day doing something "grand" with her life: painting famous pictures, saving the lives of drowning people, or leading a crusade on a white horse. She also wants to be "beautiful, of course, and good if I can."

When her mother died four years earlier, she hoped Katy would be a little mother to her siblings: in practice, she is the kind of big sister who is sometimes impatient and cross with them but leads them into all sorts of exciting adventures.

When Cousin Helen, an invalid, comes to visit, Katy is so enchanted by her beauty and kindness that on the day of Helen's departure she resolves to model herself on Helen ever afterward. The very next day, however, Katy wakes in an ill humor, quarrels with her aunt and pushes her little sister so hard that she falls down half a dozen steps. Afterward, sulky and miserable, Katy decides to try out the new swing in the woodshed although Aunt Izzie has forbidden it. Aunt Izzie, who is of the belief that children should unquestionably obey their elders, does not explain that the swing is unsafe as one of the staples supporting it had cracked. Katy swings as high as she can and then, as she tries to touch the roof with her toes, the staple gives way. She falls hard, bruising her spine.

The lively Katy is now bedridden and suffering terrible pain and bitterness. Her room is dark, dreary, and cluttered with medicine bottles; when her siblings try to comfort her, she drives them away. However, a visit from Cousin Helen shows her that she must either learn to make the best of her situation or risk losing her family's love. Helen tells Katy that she is now a student in the "School of Pain" where she will learn lessons in patience, cheerfulness, hopefulness, neatness, and making the best of things.

With Cousin Helen's help, Katy makes her room tidy and nice to visit and gradually all the children gravitate to it, coming in to see her whenever they can. She becomes the heart of the home, beloved by her family for her unfailing kindness and good cheer. After two years Aunt Izzie dies and Katy takes over the running of the household. At the end of four years, in a chapter called "At Last", she learns to walk again.

The book includes several poems that the characters wrote.

== Characters ==
Katy Carr: the eldest of the Carr children and the novel's protagonist. At the beginning of the book she is a 12-year-old tomboy, who much prefers running around outdoors to quiet 'ladylike' pursuits, and so tears her clothes and is always untidy; however, she longs to be good.

Clover Carr: the second-eldest sister adores Katy and follows her in everything she does. Clover is pretty and clever with a cheerful disposition; she is described as loving everyone and is loved by everyone in return.

Elsie Carr: the third sister, an awkward child at the beginning of the book, too old to play with the 'babies' and too young to be included in Katy and Clover's games. She tries her hardest to join in, but is usually ignored. After Katy is injured Elsie proves very helpful and considerate, and she and Katy finally grow close.

Dorry Carr: a stolid boy and great eater, the fourth Carr is the eldest son. He develops a certain mechanical skill over time.

Johnnie Carr (short for Joanna): the fifth child, a tomboy. She and Dorry are close.

Phil Carr: the baby of the family, who is only four years old at the book's beginning.

Cecy Hall: a pretty and tidy girl, the daughter of a nearby neighbour and a good friend of the siblings.

Imogen Clark: a classmate of Katy and Clover; a silly, affected girl. Initially she enthralls Katy with her romantic imagination, but she proves dishonest and self-centered and, as her father predicted, Katy grows disillusioned with her.

Papa (Dr Philip Carr): the children's father, a very busy doctor who has been a single parent, firm but understanding, since his wife's death when Katy was eight.

Aunt Izzie: Papa's sister, an old-fashioned woman who raises the children after their mother dies. She is very particular and often scolds because she does not understand the children's ways, although she has a heart of gold.

Cousin Helen: Papa's niece; she cannot walk because of an accident years ago. Despite her suffering she is amusing, cheerful, and kind; just what Katy wants to be. After Katy's accident, Cousin Helen helps her adjust to her illness.

== Themes ==
Susan Coolidge shared her publisher, Roberts Brothers, with Louisa May Alcott, and What Katy Did helped satisfy the demand for naturalistic novels about girlhood that followed the 1868 success of Little Women. Like Alcott, Coolidge heightened the realism of her novel by drawing on her own childhood memories.

What Katy Did also illustrates social shifts. First the novel depicts the treatment of serious injury in the 19th century. After her accident, young Katy is given much love and care; however, she is sad, confined to an upstairs room, and, although she has a wheelchair, she never goes further than her bedroom window. The possibility that she could leave her room is barely considered and no-one thinks of moving her to the ground floor. She copes by making herself and her room so pleasant that everyone comes to her. Early on, she goes out in a carriage, but finds the experience so painful that she never tries it again. Thereafter, she lives in her bedroom, makes the best of things and waits, hoping to outgrow her injury. There is no physical therapy – instead Katy is warned to avoid too much movement lest she "set herself back". Cousin Helen manages to travel a little, and even goes for a hydrotherapy water cure at one point, but it is made clear that she has no hope of ever walking again.

== Extract ==
Katy's hair was forever in a snarl; her gowns were always catching on nails and 'tearing themselves'; and, in spite of her age and size, she was as heedless and innocent as a child of six. Katy was the longest girl that was ever seen. What she did to make herself grow so, nobody could tell; but there she was—up above Papa's ear, and a half a head taller than poor Aunt Izzie. Whenever she stopped to think about her height she became very awkward, and felt as if she were all legs and elbows, and angles and joints. Happily, her head was so full of other things, of plans and schemes and fancies of all sorts, that she didn't often take time to remember how tall she was. She was a dear, loving child, for all her careless habits, and made bushels of good resolutions every week of her life, only unluckily she never kept any of them. She had fits of responsibility about the other children, and longed to set them a good example, but when the chance came, she generally forgot to do so. Katy's days flew like the wind; for when she wasn't studying lessons, or sewing and darning with Aunt Izzie, which she hated extremely, there were always so many delightful schemes rioting in her brains, that all she wished for was ten pairs of hands to carry them out.

— What Katy Did, Chapter 1.

== Adaptations ==
Two TV movies and a brief TV series have been based on What Katy Did. The most recent film (1999) starred Alison Pill as Katy, with Kevin Whately as Papa, Megan Follows as Cousin Helen, Michael Cera as Dorry, Bryn McAuley as Joanna, and Dean Stockwell as "Tramp". A 1972 UK movie adaptation, Katy, starred Clare Walker, and the 1962 eight-part TV series made in the UK, also called Katy, featured rising star Susan Hampshire in the title role. In 2015, author Jacqueline Wilson wrote her novel Katy, which is a modern retelling of What Katy Did; in 2018, the Wilson novel was adapted into the CBBC TV series Katy. The August 2016 edition of Storytime featured a new illustrated adaptation with illustrations by Italian artist Marco Guadalupi.

== Sequels ==
What Katy Did was followed by four sequels: What Katy Did at School in which Katy and Clover attend the fictional Hillsover School (set in Hanover, New Hampshire); What Katy Did Next, in which a new friend of Katy's takes her on a once-in-a-lifetime trip to Europe; Clover, in which Katy is married and Clover accompanies her brother Phil to Colorado after he falls ill; and In the High Valley, which shows the lives of a handful of young people living in the High Valley in Colorado, including Clover, Elsie and their husbands.

== References in popular culture ==
- Nancy Mitford mentions What Katy Did in the first chapter her novel The Pursuit of Love in relation to Linda, "who saw herself as Katy in What Katy Did, the reins of the household gathered into small but capable hands" when she and her siblings wished to become total orphans during a Christmas holiday when their parents took an ocean liner to Canada.
- "What Katie Did" is the name of a song by the Libertines that may have been inspired by the book. The lyrics refer to the characters, e.g. "Hurry up Mrs. Brown". The group Babyshambles later released a song entitled "What Katy Did Next". Both were written by Libertines and Babyshambles frontman Pete Doherty.
- "What Kate Did" is the name of the ninth episode of season 2 of Lost.
- "What Kate Does" is the name of the second episode of season 6 of Lost.
- A character named Katy Carr appears in the first volume of Alan Moore's graphic novel The League of Extraordinary Gentlemen. As Katy beats a student at Ms Coote's school, the headmistress says she believes in the "School of Pain".
- Idahoan songwriter Josh Ritter includes a reference to What Katy Did in his song "Monster Ballads" on his album The Animal Years.
- In the movie Coffee and Cigarettes by Jim Jarmusch, a Steve Coogan fan says her name is Katy and he answers "What Katy did next".
- The protagonist of Avi's The True Confessions of Charlotte Doyle introduces her own story by saying "This is no 'Story of a Bad Boy,' no 'What Katy Did,'" to indicate that she is not remorseful for her unladylike behavior.
- The title of the Philip Larkin poem "Forget What Did" is a reference to Dorry's repeated journal entry in What Katy Did.
