= Cathie Jung =

Woman with the smallest waist (1937–2025)

- Born: Catherine Climenko; March 15, 1937; New York
- Died: August 19, 2025 (aged 88); Houston, Texas
- Education: Tufts University
- Known for: Having smallest waist when living
- Spouse: Bob Jung

Catherine Climenko Jung (March 15, 1937 – August 19, 2025) was an American Victorian dress and corset enthusiast residing in Manteo, North Carolina. Since 1999, she held the Guinness World Record for the smallest waist on a living person. Jung, who was 1.72 meters (5 ft 8 in) tall, had a waist that measured 38.1 centimeters (15.0 in).

Jung appeared uncredited, by her own choice, due to the undesirable contents, in the Matthew Barney film Cremaster 2 in the role of Baby Fay La Foe.

== Personal life and death ==
Jung was married to Bob Jung, an orthopedic surgeon, with whom she had three children, including a daughter. Jung studied biology at Tufts University, where she met her future husband.

She began waist training in 1959, shortly before her marriage.

Jung died on August 19, 2025, at the age of 88.
