= Kevin Heffernan =

Kevin Heffernan may refer to:

- Kevin Heffernan (actor) (born 1968), American actor, writer, producer and director
- Kevin Heffernan (Gaelic footballer) (1929–2013), Irish Gaelic footballer and manager
