= Katie (disambiguation) =

Katie is a feminine name and unisex surname.

Katie may also refer to:

- Katie, Oklahoma, United States, a town
- USS Katie (SP-660), a United States Navy patrol vessel in commission from 1917 to 1918
- Katie (talk show), a syndicated American talk show (2012–2014) hosted by Katie Couric
- Katie (British TV series), a reality TV show about Katie Price
- Katie: Portrait of a Centerfold, a 1978 American TV movie starring Kim Basinger
- The W19 nuclear artillery shell

== See also ==
- Karie (disambiguation)
- Katie.com: My Story, a memoir by Katie Tarbox
