= George Cathie (footballer, born 1905) =

Australian rules footballer, born 1905

Personal information
- Full name: George Mitchell Cathie
- Born: 26 October 1905; Hawthorn, Victoria
- Died: 29 April 1967 (aged 61); Carrum, Victoria
- Original team: Collegians

Playing career^{1}
Years	Club	Games (Goals)
1929–30	Hawthorn	20 (1)
- ^{1} Playing statistics correct to the end of 1930.

George Mitchell Cathie (26 October 1905 – 29 April 1967) was an Australian rules footballer who played with Hawthorn in the Victorian Football League (VFL).
