= Cathie Beck =

American journalist (born 1955)

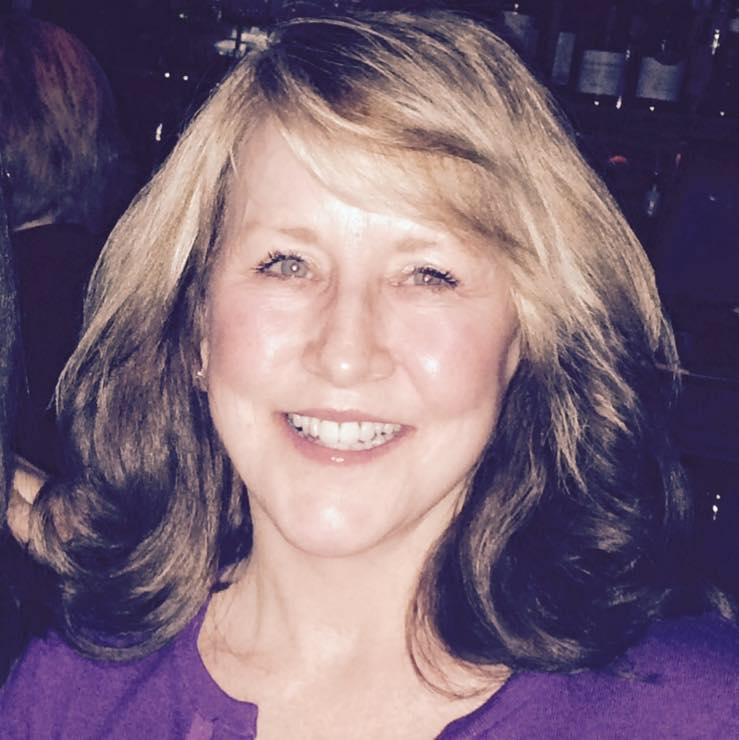
- Beck in 2017
- Born: August 3, 1955 (age 71); Fort Dodge, Iowa
- Education: Louisiana Tech University
- Occupation: Journalist

Cathie Beck (born August 3, 1955) is an American journalist and creative writer based in Denver, Colorado. Her memoir Cheap Cabernet: A Friendship, which she self-published in October 2009, was published by Hyperion Books in July 2010.

Iris Dart, author of “Beaches” endorses Cheap Cabernet: A Friendship on the book cover. Cheap Cabernet: A Friendship got picked up by Hyperion Books after it hit No. 1 Amazon Movers & Shakers.

Cheap Cabernet: A Friendship went on to win:

Midwest Booksellers Association – Best New Book

Target Stores Emerging Author Selection

Women's National Book Association Great Group Read – Finalist

Books for a Better Life Award – Finalist

Denver Women's Press Club – 1st Place, Non-Fiction

Denver Post Books – Five Times Best Seller

== Biography ==
Born in Fort Dodge, Iowa, Beck has lived in Indianapolis, Indiana, New Orleans, Louisiana, and Boulder, Colorado. She currently resides in Denver, Colorado.

Graduate of the Louisiana Tech University Journalism Department, and the Creative Writing Graduate Program at the University of Colorado at Boulder, Beck has written for the Daily Camera (Boulder), the Los Angeles Times, The Denver Post, The Rocky Mountain News, The Denver Business Journal, Poets & Writers Magazine, and Writer's Digest. She presently contributes to a number of major publications, including The Denver Post, and is “The Wine Wench” columnist for ColoradoBiz magazine and KUVO in Denver, Colorado.

She is the recipient of the Louisiana Press Women's and Denver Press Woman's Writing Awards, the Scripps-Howard Award for Excellence in Journalism, and the University of Colorado-Louisiana Tech University's Dean's Award for Writing.

== Literary Influences ==
Beck's literary influences include Flannery O'Connor, Dorothy Parker, Anton Chekhov, Leo Tolstoy, Raymond Carver, Barbara Kingsolver, Frank McCourt, and David Sedaris.
