= Cathy Heffernan =

Irish journalist and documentarist

Cathy Heffernan is an Irish freelance journalist, documentarist and producer living in England. She is deaf and a British Sign Language user as well as her native Irish Sign Language.

== Activity ==
Hefferman started her career as a researcher on Hands On, the deaf magazine programme of RTE1, the Irish television.

She then joined the Guardian, for which she worked as an investigative journalist and subeditor from 2008 until 2013.

She has experience in observational documentary-making. She co-produced Deaf Sisterhood, a documentary about a deaf woman considering converting to Islam, with Bim Ajadi and Ted Evans, and directed Crossing the Divide.

As a director, she was also involved in some feature-length programmes for the BBC's deaf magazine See Hear and produced a film on deaf education for Channel 4.

She is an executive producer for the British Sign Language Broadcasting Trust, a trust commissioning programmes and movies in British Sign Language.

She is a keen theatre-goer, and in 2014 she directed an observational documentary following Deafinitely Theatre on their production of A Midsummer Night's Dream to be performed in Sign Language at the Globe.
