= Katy (novel) =

2015 novel by Jacqueline Wilson

- First edition
- Author: Jacqueline Wilson
- Illustrator: Nick Sharratt
- Language: English
- Genre: Children's novel
- Publisher: Puffin (first edition, hardback)
- Publication date: 30 July 2015 (hardcover); 5 May 2016 (paperback)
- Publication place: United Kingdom
- Media type: Print (hardback & paperback) and audiobook
- Pages: 480 pg
- ISBN: 978-0-141-35396-8

Katy is a 2015 children's book by author Jacqueline Wilson. It is a modern-day retelling of Susan Coolidge's 1872 novel What Katy Did, with certain elements of the story altered to better suit a contemporary audience. The book centers on Katy, a headstrong young girl who is paralysed from the waist down after a fall from a swing and must learn to accept and live with her disability.

== Plot ==
Katy and her siblings often sneak next door to their neighbour's back garden, calling it a secret garden, and they play all sorts of games. Katy has a best friend called Cecy, who comes to the secret garden too. Katy's family consists of her dad, who is a doctor; Izzie, her stepmother; Clover, her sister, who is described as sweet, kind and caring; Elsie, her stepsister who she does not get along with; and her half-siblings, six-year-old twins Dorry and Jonnie, and three-year-old Phil.

During the school holidays, her father's old patient, Helen, comes on a visit. Helen uses a wheelchair due to rheumatic arthritis. Katy and her siblings are inspired by her deeply. At the end of Helen's visit, she produces one of her possessions, a seahorse necklace, and decides to give it to Katy. Katy vows to treasure it forever.

One day during the summer, Katy decides to sneak out to go to a skatepark, but she is unable to find it. In despair, she decides to go back home but breaks the chain on her seahorse necklace in the process. Her stepmother Izzie grounds her for sneaking out, and Katy is not allowed to go to the swimming pool with the rest of her family.

Katy decides that she can still have fun by herself. She takes a rope to the secret garden next door and attempts to build a swing with a rope by tying it to the branch of a tree, but the rope is not knotted correctly, and unties itself. She falls from the tree, breaking her spine in the process, and she has vivid flashbacks of her mother. Mrs Burton, the woman who owns the garden, sees Katy fall and calls an ambulance.

Katy is rushed to the hospital, where they start operating on her and discover she is now paralyzed from the waist down. During her hospital stay, she meets an edgy older boy called Dexter in the boys ward and the two form a friendship quickly. Katy also starts to get along with the other girls in her ward, feeling fond of them. Her siblings come to visit with presents. She also forms a better relationship with her stepmother and stepsister.

After Katy leaves the hospital, Helen comes to visit, making Katy realise that a disability can't stop her from living the life she wants. Katy starts to attend secondary school where her friends have already started. She struggles with her experiences in a wheelchair, but eventually learns that her disability doesn't define her.

The book ends with Katy receiving presents from people around her at Christmas, including a new wheelchair.

== Characters ==
Katy Carr: An 11-year-old tomboyish and daredevil girl who is the eldest in the family.

Clover Carr: The second-eldest sister who adores Katy and follows her in everything she does. Clover is pretty and clever with a cheerful disposition; she is described as "blue eyed" and "blonde".

Elsie Carr: The third sister, an awkward child at the beginning of the book, who is too old to play with the 'babies' and too young to be included in Katy and Clover's games. She tries her hardest to join in, but is usually ignored. After Katy is injured, Elsie proves very helpful and considerate, and she and Katy finally grow close.

Dorry Carr: (short for Dorian) An overweight boy who is the twin of Jonnie, he is often stereotyped to like eating.

Jonnie Carr (short for Johanna): A tomboyish girl who is the twin of Dorry, she is attached to a toy zebra chair named 'Zebby'.

Phil Carr: The baby of the family.

Cecy Hall: A pretty and tidy girl, the daughter of their neighbour and a good friend of Katy's siblings.

Eva Jenkins: A classmate of Katy and Cecy, who is described as "silly" and "self centered".

Alistair Carr: The children's father, who is struggling with his first wife's death. He is also Helen's old doctor.

Izzie: Katy and Clover's stepmother.

Helen: Doctor Carr's old patient, who is unable to walk because of rheumatic arthritis years ago. Despite her suffering, she is amusing, cheerful, and kind, and all the children love her being around. After Katy's accident, Helen helps her adjust to her illness.

Dexter: A 16-year-old boy in the boys ward at the hospital. He is also paralysed like Katy after a motorcycle accident. He has a connection with drawing, and despite his and Katy's age gap, they become firm friends.

== Adaptation ==
In June 2017, CBBC announced they have commissioned a three-part series based on the novel.

The three-part TV series Katy began on 14 March 2018.
