= Kathie =

Kathie is a given name. Notable people with the name include:

- Kathie Browne (1929-2003), American actress
- Kathie Conway (born 1955), American politician
- Kathie Dello, American science communicator
- Kathie-Ann Joseph, American surgeon and researcher
- Kathie Kay (1918-2005), Scottish singer
- Kathie Lee Gifford (born 1953), American singer, songwriter, and actress
- Kathie Nukon (born 1947), Canadian politician
- Kathie L. Olsen, American neuroscientist
