= Sarah Chauncey Woolsey =

American children's author and novelist (1835-1905)

Susan Coolidge
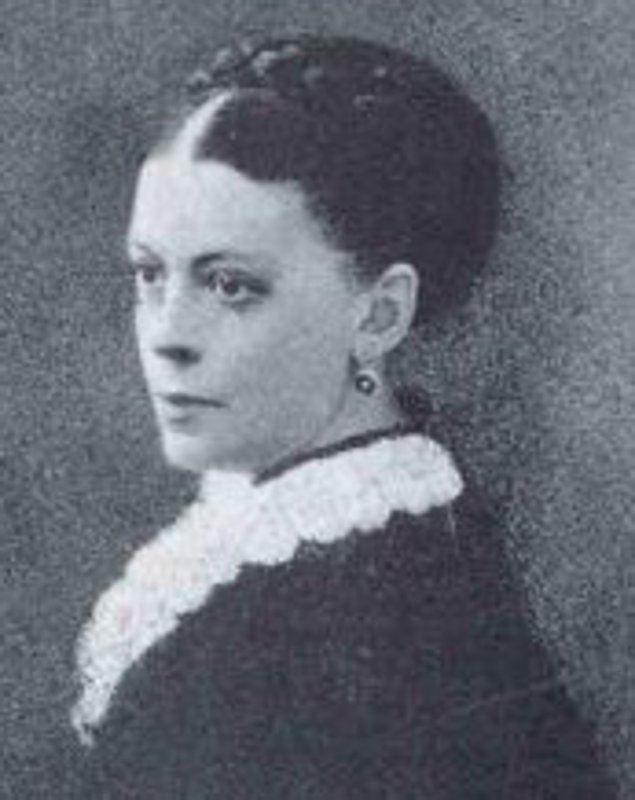
- Born: Sarah Chauncey Woolsey; January 29, 1835; Cleveland, Ohio, U.S.
- Died: April 9, 1905 (aged 70); Newport, Rhode Island, U.S.
- Occupation: Children's author
- Writing career
- Pen name: Susan Coolidge
- Notable work: What Katy Did (1872)

Sarah Chauncey Woolsey (January 29, 1835 – April 9, 1905), known by her pen name Susan Coolidge, was an American children's author, known for her novel What Katy Did (1872).

== Background ==
Woolsey was born on January 29, 1835, in Cleveland, Ohio, to John Mumford Woolsey and Jane Andrews. She was a member of the wealthy New England Dwight family, and author and poet Gamel Woolsey was her niece. Her family moved to New Haven, Connecticut, in 1852.

Woolsey worked as a nurse during the American Civil War (1861–1865), after which she started to write. She never married, and resided at her family home in Newport, Rhode Island, until her death. She edited The Autobiography and Correspondence of Mrs. Delaney (1879) and The Diary and Letters of Frances Burney (1880).

She is best known for her classic children's novel What Katy Did (1872). The fictional Carr family was modeled after her own, with Katy Carr inspired by Woolsey herself. The brothers and sisters were modeled on her four younger siblings: Jane Andrews Woolsey, born October 25, 1836, who married Reverend Henry Albert Yardley; Elizabeth Dwight Woolsey, born April 24, 1838, who married Daniel Coit Gilman and died in 1910; Theodora Walton Woolsey, born September 7, 1840; and William Walton Woolsey, born July 18, 1842, who married Catherine Buckingham Convers, daughter of Charles Cleveland Convers.

== Works ==
=== Books ===
Katy Series

- 1872: What Katy Did or What Katy did at Home
- 1873: What Katy Did at School
- 1886: What Katy Did Next
- 1888: Clover
- 1890: In the High Valley

Single books

- 1871: New-Year's Bargain
- 1874: Mischief's Thanksgiving, and other stories
- 1874: Little Miss Mischief, and other stories
- 1875: Nine Little Goslings
- 1875: Curly Locks
- 1876: For Summer Afternoons
- 1879: Eyebright
- 1880: Verses
- 1880: A Guernsey lily or, How the feud was healed
- 1881: Cross Patch, and other stories (adaptation of Mother Goose)
- 1883: A Round Dozen
- 1884: Toinette and the Elves (originally published in St. Nicholas Magazine)
- 1885: A Little Country Girl
- 1886: One Day in a Baby's Life (adaption of French book by M. Arnaud)
- 1887: Ballads of Romance and History
- 1887: A Short History of the City of Philadelphia from its foundation to the present time
- 1889: A Few More Verses
- 1889: Just Sixteen
- 1890: The Day's Message (editor)
- 1892: Rhymes and Ballads for Girls and Boys
- 1893: The Barberry Bush
- 1894: Not Quite Eighteen
- 1895: An Old Convent School In Paris
- 1899: A Little Knight of Labor (first serialized in Wide Awake)
- 1900: Little Tommy Tucker
- 1900: Two Girls
- 1901: Little Bo-Beep
- 1902: Uncle and Aunt
- 1904: The Rule of Three
- 1906: Last Verses
- 1906: A Sheaf of Stories

=== Selected work in periodicals ===
- 1871 Girls of the Far North (serial) The Little Corporal, April - August 1871
- 1874: How St. Valentine Remembered Milly, (story) St. Nicholas, February 1874
- 1875: The Cradle Tomb at Westminster (poem), Scribner's Monthly, October 1875
- 1876: Toinette and the Elves (A Christmas Story), (story) St. Nicholas, Jan 1876
- 1877: The Two Wishes, A Fairy Story, (story) St. Nicholas, March 1877
- 1879: The Old Stone Basin, (poem) St. Nicholas, January 1879
- 1880: Kintu (poem) Atlantic Monthly, August 1880
- 1882: Concord (poem), Atlantic Monthly magazine, July 1882
- 1887: Lohengrin'(poem), Scribner's Magazine, May 1887
- 1888: Charlotte Bronte, (poem) St. Nicholas, December 1888
- 1889: A Little Knight of Labor (serial), Wide Awake, September - November 1889
- 1890: Hour of Comfort, Poem, The Illustrated Christian Weekly, November 29, 1890
- 1899: The Better Way (poem), The Indian Helper, November 3, 1899
- 1903: Dr. Johnson and Hodge His Cat, United Presbyterian Youth Evangelist Paper, July 12, 1903

=== Translations ===
German

- Wenn morgen heute ist..., Erich Schmidt Verlag, 1956 = What Katy Did

Finnish

- Katyn toimet = What Katy Did
- Katy koulussa = What Katy Did at School
- Katyn myöhemmät toimet = What Katy Did Next
- Clover = Clover
- Alppilaakson maja = In the High Walley

Norwegian

- Katy, den eldste av seks = What Katy Did
- Katy på skolen = What Katy Did at School
- Hva Katy gjorde siden = What Katy Did Next
- Katy på reise
- Katy hjemme
- Clara, Katys søster = Clover
- Øientrøst : fortælling
- Høiendal = In the High Walley

Russian

- Что Кейти делала = What Katy Did
- Что Кейти делала в школе = What Katy Did at School
- Что Кейти делала потом = What Katy Did Next

Swedish

- Katy i hemmet = What Katy Did
- Katy i skolan = What Katy Did at School
- Vad Katy gjorde sedan = What Katy Did Next
- Clover : Berättelse för flickor. = Clover

Italian

- Cio che fece Katy = What Katy Did

Spanish

- Las cosas de Katy = What Katy Did

Portuguese

- O que Katy fez = What Katy Did
- O que Katy fez a seguir = What Katy Did Next
- Os sonhos de Katy

Danish

- Katy, den ældste af seks = What Katy Did
- Katy-bøkerne
- I Fiesole
- Den hemmelige Dør

=== Articles on Susan Coolidge ===
1959: Susan Coolidge, the Horn Book Magazine of books and reading for children and young people. 14 pages in June 1959
