= Chick-fil-A and LGBTQ people =

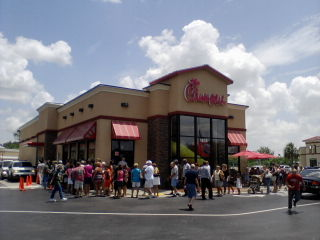
"Chick-fil-A Appreciation Day" held on August 1, 2012, in Port Charlotte, Florida

Issues arose between Chick-fil-A and the LGBTQ community in June 2012 after Dan T. Cathy, the fast food restaurant's chief executive officer, made a series of public comments opposing same-sex marriage. This followed reports that Chick-fil-A's charitable endeavor, the S. Truett Cathy-operated WinShape Foundation, had donated millions of dollars to organizations seen by LGBTQ activists as hostile to LGBTQ rights. Activists called for protests and boycotts, while supporters of the restaurant chain and opponents of same-sex marriage ate there in support of the restaurant. National political figures both for and against the actions spoke out and some business partners severed ties with the chain.

The outcome of the initial controversy was mixed, as Chick-fil-A's sales rose twelve percent to $4.6 billion in the period immediately following the controversy; this was largely attributed to former Governor of Arkansas Mike Huckabee's counter-boycott launched in support of the restaurant. However, the company's public image and standing with the LGBTQ community was damaged, with the chain facing criticism and condemnation from politicians and gay rights activists, as well as efforts by activists and political officials to ban the restaurant from college campuses, airports, and elsewhere. Chick-fil-A released a statement in July 2012 stating, "Going forward, our intent is to leave the policy debate over same-sex marriage to the government and political arena." In March 2014, tax filings for 2012 showed the group stopped funding all but one (the Fellowship of Christian Athletes) of the organizations which had been previously criticized.

In 2017, tax filings showed that the groups supported by Chick-fil-A expanded to include The Salvation Army, which has been seen as counter to LGBTQ rights. In November 2019, Chick-fil-A announced that it would not make contributions in 2020 to the Fellowship of Christian Athletes and The Salvation Army. They did not establish any criteria for corporate donations that would rule out future contributions to groups criticized as anti-LGBTQ.

As of 2021, the owner, Dan Cathy, is still actively involved with groups such as the National Christian Foundation, an organization opposed to the Equality Act.

== History ==
=== Group contributions from opponents of LGBTQ causes ===
The WinShape Foundation, a charitable endeavor of Chick-fil-A founder S. Truett Cathy and his family, stated that it would not allow same-sex couples to participate in its marriage retreats. Chick-fil-A gave over $8 million to the WinShape Foundation in 2010. Equality Matters, an LGBTQ watchdog group, published reports of donations by WinShape to organizations that Equality Matters considers anti-gay, including $2 million in 2009, $1.9 million in 2010 and a total of $5 million since 2003, including grants to the Family Research Council and Georgia Family Council. WinShape contributed grants to the Fellowship of Christian Athletes, and Exodus International, an organization noted for supporting ex-gay conversion therapy.

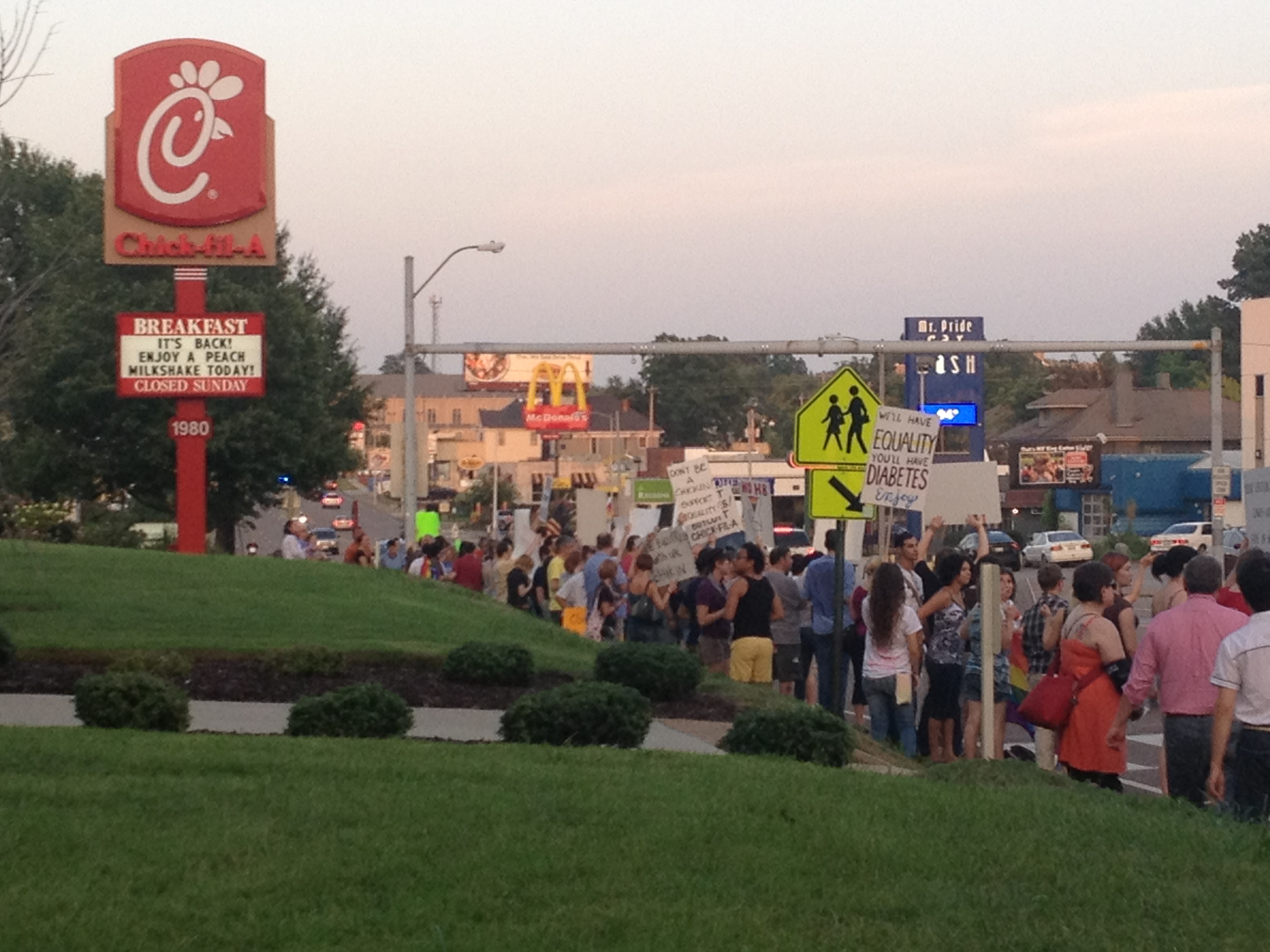
Protestors at a Memphis, Tennessee Chick-fil-A store on Same Sex Kiss Day

The Marriage and Family Foundation received $994,199 in 2009 and $1,188,380 in 2010. The Family Research Council, an organization listed as an anti-gay hate group by the Southern Poverty Law Center in winter 2010, received $1000.

In January 2011, the media reported that the American fast food restaurant chain Chick-fil-A was co-sponsoring a marriage conference along with the Pennsylvania Family Institute (PFI), an organization that had filed an amicus brief against striking down Proposition 8 in California (see Perry v. Brown). The PFI lobbied against a state effort to ban discrimination in Pennsylvania on the basis of sexual orientation or gender identity. Responding on its official company Facebook page, Chick-fil-A said that support of the PFI retreat had come from a local franchisee, stating "We have determined that one of our independent restaurant operators in Pennsylvania was asked to provide sandwiches to two Art of Marriage video seminars."

Tax filings for 2012 showed that Chick-fil-A created a new foundation, the Chick-fil-A Foundation, to provide grants to outside groups. It funded only one previously funded group, the Fellowship of Christian Athletes. Other filings for WinShape Foundation showed no funding for groups opposed to LGBT causes.

=== Statements by Dan Cathy ===
On June 16, 2012, while on the syndicated radio talk show, The Ken Coleman Show, Chick-fil-A president and chief operating officer (COO) Dan Cathy stated:

I think we are inviting God's judgment on our nation when we shake our fist at Him and say, "We know better than you as to what constitutes a marriage". I pray God's mercy on our generation that has such a prideful, arrogant attitude to think that we have the audacity to define what marriage is about.

The following month, on July 2, Biblical Recorder published an interview with Dan Cathy, who was asked about opposition to his company's "support of the traditional family." He replied: "Well, guilty as charged." Cathy continued:

"We are very much supportive of the family—the biblical definition of the family unit. We are a family-owned business, a family-led business, and we are married to our first wives. We give God thanks for that. ...We want to do anything we possibly can to strengthen families. We are very much committed to that," Cathy emphasized. "We intend to stay the course," he said. "We know that it might not be popular with everyone, but thank the Lord, we live in a country where we can share our values and operate on biblical principles."

The day after the Supreme Court of the United States struck down Section 3 of the Defense of Marriage Act, Cathy tweeted, "Sad day for our nation; founding fathers would be ashamed of our gen. to abandon wisdom of the ages re: cornerstone of strong societies." The tweet was subsequently deleted, but was archived by Topsy.

In March 2014, Cathy said he regretted drawing his company into the controversy. He told the Atlanta Journal-Constitution he has been working with Shane Windmeyer of Campus Pride since 2012. The article noted that WinShape and the Chick-fil-A Foundation had "dramatically" cut donations to groups opposed by same-sex marriage supporters.

=== Policy changes ===
In September 2012, The Civil Rights Agenda (TCRA) announced that Chick-fil-A had "ceased donating to organizations that promote discrimination, specifically against LGBT civil rights". This change in policy was not confirmed by Chick-fil-A officials. Chick-fil-A officials did state in an internal document that they "will treat every person equally, regardless of sexual orientation". In a letter from Chick-fil-A's Senior Director of Real Estate, the company states, "The WinShape Foundation is now taking a much closer look at the organizations it considers helping, and in that process will remain true to its stated philosophy of not supporting organizations with political agendas."

According to Focus on the Family website, CitizenLink.com: "Contrary to reports first made by the gay-activist group The Civil Rights Agenda (TCRA) on Tuesday and later picked up by mainstream media outlets, Chick-fil-A and its charitable-giving arm, the WinShape Foundation, did not agree to stop making donations to groups that support the biblical definition of marriage in exchange for being allowed to open a franchise in Chicago."

Former Arkansas Governor and Fox News commentator Mike Huckabee claimed on September 21, 2012, that he had "talked earlier today personally with Dan Cathy, CEO of Chick-fil-A about the new reports that Chick-fil-A had capitulated to demands of the supporters of same sex marriage. This is not true. The company continues to focus on the fair treatment of all of its customers and employees, but to end confusion gave me this statement." The statement provided by Chick-fil-A was posted on Huckabee's website but the company did not respond to requests for comment. In March 2014, new tax filings from 2012 showed that the company had stopped funding all but one organization which had been previously criticized by LGBTQ activists and supporters, and that group received just $25,390. The company created a new foundation, the Chick-fil-A Foundation, to fund outside groups. WinShape Foundation's 2012 tax filings showed funding only for its own programs, a Berry College scholarship fund, and Lars WinShape, a home for needy children in Brazil.

In 2017, Chick-fil-A said it was warning all its franchisees against speaking out publicly or getting involved in anything that could blur the line between their private beliefs and their public roles as extensions of the Chick-fil-A brand. In 2017, that message extended to politics, in part to keep the brand from being exploited by candidates. The company turned down several candidates who tried to use Chick-fil-A to bolster their campaigns, according to David Farmer, Chick-fil-A's vice president of menu strategy and development. "There are several candidates who would like to use us as a platform," Farmer told Business Insider. "We are not engaging. Chick-fil-A is about food, and that's it. "The company still encourages its franchisees to get 'entrenched' in their communities..." Traditionally, that has meant getting involved in local churches. Chick-fil-A says its focus now—both for local and corporate involvement and philanthropy—is on youth and education causes.

In an interview with Bisnow in 2019, Chick-fil-A President Tim Tassopoulos said the company would stop donating to charities with anti-LGBTQ views. The company would instead donate to charities focused on education, homelessness and hunger. These new organizations could include both faith-based and non-faith-based charities, but the company said none of the organizations have anti-LGBTQ positions.

== Controversy ==
=== United States government ===
On May 29, 2019, the Federal Aviation Administration's Office of Civil Rights opened investigations into two airports (Buffalo Niagara International Airport and San Antonio International Airport) for excluding Chick-fil-A from opening restaurants due to the company's long history of supporting and funding anti-LGBTQ organizations. Federal requirements prohibit airport operators from excluding persons, on the basis of religious creed, from participating in airport activities that receive or benefit from FAA grant funding.

=== Local government ===
After the publication of Cathy's interviews, Democrat Thomas Menino, the Mayor of Boston, stated that he would not allow the company to open franchises in the city "unless they open up their policies." Menino subsequently wrote a letter to Dan Cathy, citing Cathy's earlier statement on The Ken Coleman Show, and responded: "We are indeed full of pride for our support of same sex marriage and our work to expand freedom for all people."

In Chicago, Democratic alderman Proco Joe Moreno announced his determination to block Chick-fil-A's bid to build a second store in the city: "They'd have to do a complete 180", Moreno said in outlining conditions under which he would retract the block. "They'd have to work with LGBT groups in terms of hiring, and there would have to be a public apology from [Cathy]." Moreno received backing from Chicago's Mayor, Rahm Emanuel: "Chick-fil-A values are not Chicago values", Emanuel said in a statement. "They disrespect our fellow neighbors and residents. This would be a bad investment, since it would be empty." Also according to Moreno, Chick-fil-A included a statement of respect for all people regardless of sexual orientation in an internal document called Chick-fil-A: Who We Are. A document released by Chick-fil-A on September 20, 2012, did not mention any organizations opposed to same-sex marriage as being part of Chick-fil-A's donation base. WinShape Marriage will continue to be supported financially, with a stated focus on couple retreats to strengthen marriages.

San Francisco soon followed suit on July 26, 2012, when mayor Democrat Edwin M. Lee tweeted, "Very disappointed #ChickFilA doesn't share San Francisco's values & strong commitment to equality for everyone." Lee followed that tweet with "Closest #ChickFilA to San Francisco is 40 miles away & I strongly recommend that they not try to come any closer."

Later the same month, Washington D.C. mayor Democrat Vincent C. Gray continued the trend by announcing Chick-fil-A is not welcome in his city, and proceeded to call it "hate chicken".

The proposed bans in Boston and Chicago drew criticism from some liberal pundits, legal experts, and the American Civil Liberties Union (ACLU). Kevin Drum of Mother Jones magazine said "[T]here's really no excuse for Emanuel's and Menino's actions... you don't hand out business licenses based on whether you agree with the political views of the executives. Not in America, anyway ... what makes this whole situation so weird is that Chick-fil-A President Dan Cathy has always opposed gay marriage. He's a devout Southern Baptist, just like his father, who founded the company. The place is closed on Sundays, for crying out loud. There's just nothing new here." UCLA law professor and blogger Eugene Volokh observed, "[D]enying a private business permits because of such speech by its owner is a blatant First Amendment violation."

Echoing those views were Glenn Greenwald of Salon, professor John Turley of The George Washington University Law School, Adam Schwartz, a senior attorney with the ACLU, and Michael C. Dorf, the Robert S. Stevens Professor of Law at Cornell University Law School.

In March 2019, Texas attorney general, Ken Paxton, opened an investigation after the city of San Antonio decided to reject the application for Chick-fil-A to open a store at San Antonio International Airport because of the company's stand on LGBT issues. This stand was publicly taken by 2 out of the 10 city council members. The city's mayor, Ron Nirenberg, stated his concern was that Chick-fil-A wasn't open on Sunday. It was not until mid-August 2019 that city officials agreed to release documents about its decision to exclude the company from the airport "based on the restaurant chain's donations to religious ministries". On June 10, 2019, Texas governor Greg Abbott signed into law Senate Bill 1978, colloquially known as the "Save Chick-fil-A Bill", which forbids local governments from taking adverse steps against companies or individuals based on their religious beliefs. On September 5, a group of five individuals filed suit against the City of San Antonio citing this new law.

=== Backlash ===
Students at several colleges and universities launched efforts to ban or remove the company's restaurants from their campuses. On November 3, 2011, New York University's Student Senators Council voted 19 to 4 to retain the Chick-fil-A franchise on campus. This vote came before a petition with over 11,000 signatures opposing its presence on campus was sent to the student council. Christine Quinn, a lesbian politician and then-Speaker of the City Council who was seeking the nomination as Democratic candidate for the mayoralty in the next election, was outspoken in her opposition to keeping the Chick-fil-A franchise or allowing others, and wrote a letter to this effect to NYU President John Sexton on official letterhead, opening with the words, "I write as the Speaker of the NYC Council", urging NYU to evict a Chick-fil-A due to Cathy's opposition to same-sex marriage.

On February 28, 2012, Northeastern University's Student Senate passed a resolution to cancel plans for a Chick-fil-A franchise on its campus, stating "the student body does not support bringing CFA [Chick-fil-A] to campus", and "Student concerns reflected CFA's history of donating to anti-gay organizations." The vote was 31 to 5, with 8 abstaining. The restaurant chain was finalizing a contract to bring it to NU when students protested. Davidson College in North Carolina announced on August 13, 2012, that, in response to a petition which received 500 signatures, the school would stop serving Chick-fil-A on campus at the monthly "After Midnight" events.

Other forms of protest occurred. Gay rights activists organized a "Kiss Off" to occur on August 3, an event where LGBTQ individuals would show affection in public.

On August 15, 2012, Floyd Lee Corkins II of Virginia entered the Washington, D.C., headquarters of the Family Research Council carrying 15 Chick-fil-A sandwiches, a 9 mm handgun, and a box of ammunition. After being asked for identification, he shot a security guard in the left arm and was wrestled to the ground by that same guard. Prosecutors said he told FBI agents that he wanted to use the sandwiches to "make a statement against the people who work in that building ... and with their stance against gay rights and Chick-fil-A", and that he planned "to kill as many people as I could ... then smear a Chicken-fil-A [sic] sandwich on their face".

In 2018, Chick-fil-A announced their expansion to Canada in the city of Toronto. This caused a number of boycotts and backlash from Canadians due to widespread support for LGBTQ rights in Canada.

In August 2019, the Toronto Star ran an opinion piece, written by its National Columnist (staff), with the headline "Chick-fil-A is about to open in Toronto. I hope it fails". She said that comment was made because the company was operated by "someone who dislikes 'my lifestyle' as Chick-fil-A CEO Dan Cathy would probably refer to my lesbianism". The store opened on September 6, 2019, on Yonge St. at Bloor St. in Toronto, with LGBTQ2S protesters in attendance, complaining about the company's "history of supporting anti-LGBTQ causes", according to the Toronto Star. At that time, the company confirmed its plan to open 14 others in the Greater Toronto Area over the subsequent five years.

On November 18, 2019, it was reported that Chick-fil-A would stop donating to the Salvation Army and Fellowship of Christian Athletes, two Christian organizations that oppose same-sex marriage.

=== Corporate partners ===
In response to the July 2, 2012, interview, the Jim Henson Company, which had entered its Pajanimals in a kids' meal toy licensing arrangement in 2011, said that it would cease its business relationship with Chick-fil-A, and donate payment for the brand to Gay & Lesbian Alliance Against Defamation (GLAAD). Citing safety concerns, Chick-fil-A stopped distributing the toys. A spokeswoman stated the decision had been made on July 19 and was unrelated to the controversy.

In August 2012, petitions with over 80,000 signatures were delivered to publisher HarperCollins demanding the publisher cut plans to include Berenstain Bears titles as part of a kids' meal promotion. Upon being presented with petitions demanding that Berenstain Bears be pulled from a Chick-fil-A promotion, HarperCollins issued a statement saying "We have a long history of diversity and inclusiveness and work tirelessly to protect the freedom of expression. It is not our practice to cancel a contract with an author, or any other party, for exercising their first amendment rights."

=== Chick-fil-A Appreciation Day ===
In response to the controversy, in 2012 former Arkansas Governor Mike Huckabee initiated a Chick-fil-A Appreciation Day movement to counter a boycott of Chick-fil-A launched by same-sex marriage activists. More than 600,000 people RSVPed on Facebook for Huckabee's appreciation event.

On August 1, 2012, Chick-fil-A restaurants experienced a large show of public support across the nation with the company reporting record-breaking sales. A consulting firm projected that the average Chick-fil-A restaurant increased sales by 29.9 percent and had 367 more customers than a typical Wednesday.

=== Public polling ===
In August 2012, conservative-leaning polling group Rasmussen Reports published the results of a telephone survey indicating that 61 percent of likely voters held a favorable view of Chick-fil-A, while 13 percent indicated they would participate in a boycott.

=== Others ===
Other notable public figures came to Chick-fil-A's defense, including former Alaska Governor Sarah Palin, former US Senator Rick Santorum, and Ann Coulter; while New York Mayor Michael Bloomberg publicly disagreed with Cathy's positions but defended his right to express them under the First Amendment.

=== Financial effect ===
Sales increased after the controversy. According to news coverage:

Chick-fil-A's sales soared 12 percent, to $4.6 billion, in 2012. The good fortune follows several years of impressive expansion and strong sales, which have pushed the privately held company's valuation north of $4.5 billion, making billionaires out of its founders ... These latest sales data are just further proof that all that negative coverage didn't hurt demand for chicken sandwiches among Chick-fil-A's core consumers.

— Joe Satran, The Huffington Post

In addition Chick-fil-A was able to expand throughout the rest of the 2010s and into the 2020s despite the controversy and growing acceptance of LGBT people in the United States.

=== October 2019 closure of UK location ===
On October 18, 2019, it was announced that Chick-fil-A's location at the Oracle, Reading, in Reading, Berkshire, the first location in the United Kingdom, would close due to the Oracle not renewing their lease. The announcement was made only eight days after the location first opened, and had been preceded by severe criticism from LGBTQ rights activists in Reading and elsewhere in the UK. According to a Chick-fil-A spokesperson, the company had always intended to only be at Reading for a six month pilot period.
