= Cathy (disambiguation) =

Cathy is an American gag-a-day comic strip.

Cathy may also refer to:

- Cathy (given name), a feminine name
- Cathy (TV special), a 1987 animated television special based on the comic strip
- Typhoon Cathy (1947), a tropical cyclone in the Western Pacific Ocean
- Cyclone Cathy (1998), a tropical cyclone in the Australia region
- Cathy (play), a 2026 play by Eilidh Loan
- Members of the Cathy family, including S. Truett Cathy, founder of Chick-fil-A, and his sons Bubba Cathy and Dan Cathy

== See also ==
- Kathy
