= William E. Simon Prize for Philanthropic Leadership =

Annual award given by the William E. Simon Foundation

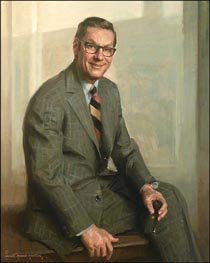
William E. Simon

The William E. Simon Prize for Philanthropic Leadership is an annual award given by the William E. Simon Foundation in honor of its founder, former Secretary of the Treasury and financier William E. Simon, and administered by the Philanthropy Roundtable.

The award was created in 2000, first awarded in 2001, and is given to "highlight the power of philanthropy to promote positive change and to inspire others to support charities that achieve genuine results." The prize is given to living donors who have "shown exemplary leadership through their own charitable giving, either directly or through foundations they have created." Donors who receive the prize are expected to exemplify Simon's ideals, which include "personal responsibility, resourcefulness, volunteerism, scholarship, individual freedom, faith in God, and helping people to help themselves."

The Simon Prize carries a $250,000 purse, which is awarded to the charity or charities of the recipient's choice.

The Simon Prize is presented at the Philanthropy Roundtable's Annual Meeting.

== List of recipients ==
Year	Recipient	Notable achievements
2001	John T. Walton	Founder of Children's Scholarship Fund, school voucher advocate
2002	Raymond G. Chambers	Private equity pioneer, Newark donor, United Nations special envoy for malaria
2003	John Templeton	Mutual fund investor, creator of Templeton Prize, founder of John Templeton Foundation
2004	David Robinson	San Antonio Spurs star, founder of Carver Academy
2005	Ben Carson	Pioneering neurosurgeon, later presidential candidate and Secretary of Housing and Urban Development
2006	Richard and Helen DeVos	Co-founder of Amway, donors to conservative causes and education reform
2007	Frank Hanna III	Merchant banker and noted Catholic philanthropist
2008	S. Truett Cathy	Founder of Chick-Fil-A and WinShape Foundation
2009	Philip and Nancy Anschutz	Founder of Anschutz Entertainment Group, Walden Media, and Foundation for a Better Life
2010	Roger Hertog	Asset management pioneer, patron of Jewish thought
2011	Charles G. Koch	Chairman and CEO of Koch Industries, funder of free-market organizations
2012	Bernie Marcus	Co-founder and former chairman and CEO of Home Depot, founder of Georgia Aquarium
2013	Eli and Edythe Broad	Built two separate Fortune 500 companies, leading education philanthropist.
2014	Jon Huntsman Sr.	Founder of Huntsman Corporation, created Huntsman Cancer Institute and has made more than $1 billion of total charitable donations.
2015	David Weekley	Chairman of David Weekley Homes in Houston, Texas, and has devoted half of his time and half of his income to philanthropic pursuits since 1992, offering strategic advice for nonprofits.
2016	Bruce and Suzie Kovner	Hedge fund manager and investor, chairman of the Juilliard School, vice chairman of Lincoln Center, former chairman of the American Enterprise Institute.
2017	Pitt and Barbara Hyde	Founder and former chairman and CEO of AutoZone; philanthropists focused on Memphis causes in education, parks, the arts and civic affairs.
2018	Paul Singer	Founder and director of Elliott Management Corporation, an investment hedge fund specializing in distressed debt acquisition.
2019	Russell L. Carson	A private-equity investor, co-founder and General Partner at private equity firm Welsh, Carson, Anderson & Stowe, and active philanthropist.
2020	John and Susan Sobrato	Founders of The Sobrato Organisation, a development firm specializing in commercial and residential real estate.
