= The Civil Rights Agenda =

- Founder: Jacob Meister
- Type: Civil rights advocacy
- Location(s): 2129 N. Western Ave; Chicago, Illinois 60647
- Region served: Illinois
- Key people: Jacob Meister, President; Anthony Martinez, Executive Director; Rick Garcia, Policy Director; Nico Lang, Associate Director
- Website: Facebook.com/jointcra

The Civil Rights Agenda (TCRA) is a civil rights advocacy organization founded in June 2010 by Jacob Meister, with a stated mission "to maintain and increase individual rights for Lesbian, Gay, Bisexual, Transgender, and Queer (LGBTQ) citizens in Illinois through inter-generational volunteerism and community-driven project-based education, statewide coalition and network building, and leadership in supporting underserved communities with the necessary tools that will equip members of those communities with the resources and confidence to establish equality for all persons, regardless of sexual orientation or gender identity."

== History and issues ==
=== Origins ===
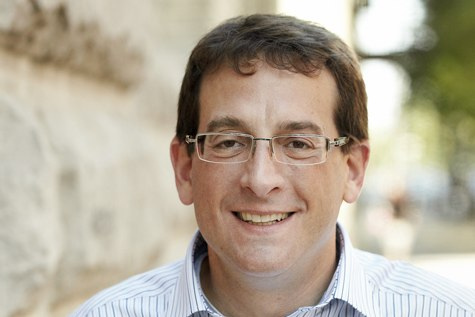
Jacob Meister, Governing Board President of The Civil Rights Agenda

The Civil Rights Agenda was founded in June 2010 by attorney Jacob Meister, who serves as the organization's Governing Board President. Meister is a lawyer from Chicago and a former Democratic candidate for the U.S. Senate in Illinois. He has practiced law in Chicago for nearly 20 years, litigating cases involving interstate commerce, telecommunications, discrimination and civil rights. Prior to his legal career he worked in both Federal and State Government. Meister ran as the first openly gay candidate for the U.S. Senate, seeking the seat vacated in 2008 by President Barack Obama.

Rick Garcia founder of Equality Illinois (EQIL) joined TCRA as policy advisor in March 2012. Garcia led the gay legislative initiative since the 1980s. He, along with others, founded Equality Illinois in 1991 and served as the organization's policy director until he was dismissed from the organization in 2010.

=== Catholic Charities ===
In April 2011, TCRA worked to mobilize opponents to Illinois Senate bill SB 1123 which, if passed, would allow religious agencies to circumvent anti-discrimination laws by rejecting openly gay prospective parents while accepting public funding for adoption and foster care services. The American Civil Liberties Union (ACLU), Family Equality Council and the Log Cabin Republicans joined in voicing opposition to the bill, which was ultimately defeated.

After the Rockford (Illinois) Diocese announced in June 2011 that they would end its state-funded adoption and foster-care program because of a new law that would require it to place children with gay or unmarried couples, TCRA reacted calling the diocese's decision "a sad display of bigotry" and said religious freedom "is granted only when the religious agency is not funded by taxpayer dollars." Diocese officials said they were forced to terminate $7.5 million in state contracts because an amendment exempting religious groups from provisions of the state's new civil unions law was excluded.

The dioceses of Joliet, Springfield and Belleville decided to sue the state, to allow them to participate in the state-funded foster care program without having to comply with the new law which grants same-sex couples similar rights as married opposite-sex couples, including the right to be foster parents. However, in 2011, Catholic Charities abandoned their lawsuit after a state court sided against the church. TCRA's Anthony Martinez responded saying, "I am encouraged to hear that Catholic Charities has realized they cannot win this lawsuit. This case...is all about prioritizing religion over what is best for the children in their care. Finding a loving home for the thousands of children in the foster/adoption system should be the priority, not trying to exclude people based on religious dogma."

=== Chick-fil-A same-sex marriage controversy ===
In August 2012, TCRA filed several complaints with the Illinois Department of Human Rights alleging that Chick-fil-A's "intolerant corporate culture" violates Illinois law as well asprovision of Illinois' Human Rights Act. Jacob Meister stated: "In our current high speed media and social media environment, Chick-fil-A has announced and caused to be published, to hundreds of millions of people, that LGBT people are unacceptable and objectionable."

In September 2012, TCRA announced that Chick-fil-A has "ceased donating to organizations that promote discrimination, specifically against LGBT civil rights." This change in policy has not been confirmed by Chick-fil-A officials. Chick-fil-A officials did state in an internal document that they "will treat every person equally, regardless of sexual orientation." TCRA's executive director Anthony Martinez stated that "Chick-fil-A has taken a big step forward ... We are encouraged by their willingness to serve all people and ensure their profits are not used to fight against a minority community."

A few days later, news reports began suggesting that Chick-fil-A had in fact not agreed to capitulate "to demands of the supporters of same sex marriage. According to Focus on the Family web site, CitizenLink.com, "Chick-fil-A and its charitable-giving arm, the WinShape Foundation, did not agree to stop making donations to groups that support the biblical definition of marriage in exchange for being allowed to open a franchise in Chicago."

== Projects ==
TCRA aims for a community-driven project-based education to secure LGBT civil rights though action, education and cooperation. Their goals are pursued in several projects.

=== The Workplace Project ===
The Illinois Human Rights Act protects people from discrimination based on sexual orientation or gender identity. TCRA engages in policy advocacy, supporting legislation promoting equality in the workplace. TCRA offers legal assistance to victims of workplace discrimination thought the Workplace Project. They also provide diversity training to corporate partners to help them adhere to inclusive employment practices and gain social understanding of the LGBT community.

=== Voter Project ===
The Voter Project is a non-partisan effort by the TCRA to provides policy-related educational support to Illinois constituents, teaching them how they can to influence policies that affect them. TCRA also conducts an ongoing statewide voter registration drive and an LGBT Census, which helps improve the understanding of the community's views on important social and civil rights issues.

=== Chicago LGBT Citywide Coalition ===
The Chicago LGBT Citywide Coalition, formed during the 2011 mayoral race, is a group consisting of more than 30 Chicago-based organizations that advocate for LGBT rights. The coalition met on an ongoing basis after the election to continue to represent the interests and concerns of the LGBT community.

The member organizations of the coalition include:

- Affinity Community Services
- AIDS Foundation of Chicago
- Amigas Latinas
- Association of Latino Men for Action (ALMA)
- Bisexual Queer Alliance
- Boricua Pride
- Center on Halsted
- Chicago Black Gay Men's Caucus
- Chicago Transgender Coalition
- Equality Illinois
- Howard Brown Health Center
- Human Rights Campaign Chicago
- I2I: Asian Pacific Islander Pride of Chicago
- Illinois Safe Schools Alliance
- Illinois Gender Advocates
- Join the Impact Chicago
- Lambda Legal
- LGBT Change
- LGBT Immigration Project of Heartland Alliance
- Lesbian & Gay Bar Association of Chicago
- Orgullo En Accion
- POW-WOW Inc.
- Public Pride Alliance
- The Civil Rights Agenda
- The Literary Exchange
- TransActions
- University of Illinois at Chicago, Gender and Sexuality Center
- Video Action League
- VIDA/SIDA
- Windy City Black LGBT Pride

=== The Faith Project ===
TCRA's Faith Project brings together people of faith to effect justice for the LGBTQ community.

=== Families United ===
The Families United Project seeks equality for every family in Illinois via political advocacy, social media, and by building community. It pursues this goal by exploring Lesbian, Gay, Bisexual, Transgender and Queer families throughout the state.

== See also ==
- Equality Matters
- Gay–straight alliance
- Human Rights Campaign
- Illinois Family Institute
- It Gets Better Project
- Recognition of same-sex unions in Illinois
- Southern Poverty Law Center
