= Greenbriar Mall =

- Back Entrance
- Location: Atlanta, Georgia, United States
- Coordinates: 33.6884°N 84.4933°W
- Opened: 1965
- Developer: Crow Carter & Associates
- Owner: Hendon Properties
- Num. of stores: 100+
- Num. of anchor tenants: 7 (4 open, 3 vacant by April 2021)
- Floor area: 678,072 sq ft (62,995.0 m^{2})
- Floors: 1 (3in Macy's, 2 in the former Burlington/Upton’s/JCPenney’s)
- Website: shopgreenbriar.com

Greenbriar Mall is a shopping mall in the Greenbriar neighborhood of Atlanta, Georgia that opened in 1965. The anchor stores are Beauty Master, Dollar Tree, Greenbriar Furniture, and Citi Trends. There are 2 vacant anchor stores that were once Burlington and Fallas. It was home to the first mall Chick-fil-A location.

== History ==
Greenbriar Center opened in August/September 1965 as Atlanta's third enclosed mall, after North Dekalb Center, in July 1965, and Columbia Mall, in August 1965. The mall was designed by Atlanta architect John Portman's firm Edwards and Portman. The design of the mall was like many of the early malls in Atlanta, with an anchor store on each end and an enclosed concourse. The complex opened with Rich's on the east end and JCPenney on the west. It was the second-largest suburban Rich's when it first opened. JCPenney closed their store on September 28, 1985, after 20 years of operation. In 1987, Uptons took over the former JCPenney site and a Circuit City store opened outside the mall. In mid-1992, Cub Foods opened a location on a mall outlot facing Lakewood Freeway. Later in 1992, the Uptons and McCrory's stores in the mall closed for good. A Burlington Coat Factory store opened on September 1, 1995, but relocated in 2019.

Greenbriar Mall housed the very first Chick-fil-A location. Local Atlanta businessman S. Truett Cathy took the chicken sandwiches served at his Dwarf House in nearby Hapeville and opened the Greenbriar store in 1967. Chick-Fil-A announced that the location would close permanently on May 20, 2023. Record Bar opened one of its stores there, to be later supplanted by Camelot Music. There was also a Happy Herman's Liquor Store, a Woolworth's dimestore and a branch of the Atlanta Public Library.

In 1991, music producer Jermaine Dupri met the duo who would become Kris Kross at Greenbriar.

In 1996 a Magic Johnson Theatres multiplex opened at the mall, and in 2002 Magic Johnson himself made an unsuccessful effort to buy the mall but the theaters, unable to recover after the Great Recession, (by then managed by AMC Theatres) closed in 2009. At that point the mall was seen as a somewhat stagnated property, although still mostly occupied. On December 6, 2019, Burlington Coat Factory relocated to Camp Creek Parkway.

On January 6, 2021, it was announced that Macy's would be closing in April 2021 as part of a plan to close 46 stores nationwide. After Macy's closed, there were no traditional anchor stores left.
