= Bo Muller-Moore =

Vermont artist

Robert "Bo" Muller-Moore is a silk screen artist based in Montpelier, Vermont, known for a legal dispute with fast food company Chick-fil-A.

== Background ==
Circa 2000, Muller-Moore, at the instigation of a kale-farming friend, created a design featuring the phrase "Eat More Kale", and started to print t-shirts bearing the design.

In 2011, Muller-Moore's application for a federal trademark to protect the "Eat More Kale" design drew an objection from Chick-fil-A. Chick-fil-A contended that the phrase infringed on its trademark, "Eat Mor Chikin," and ordered Muller-Moore to give his website to Chick-fil-A.

Chick-fil-A's actions resulted in a Streisand effect. Muller-Moore received national press coverage, vocal support from the then-governor of Vermont, Peter Shumlin, and a sharp upturn in t-shirt sales. Chick-fil-A's actions were portrayed as corporate bullying.

== Documentary ==
Muller-Moore raised funds via Kickstarter to create a documentary film about his efforts, originally to be titled A Defiant Dude it was changed to Vermont and the Big Green Nothing after the filmmaker uncovered Bo misleading the public on exactly what Chic-fil-A had done to stop him. (the film has since been completed but it's waiting for someone to pick it up for distribution.)

== Legal actions ==
In 2013, U.S. Patent and Trademark Office (USPTO) issued a preliminary "no" verdict against Muller-Moore's trademark application, resulting in speculation by trademark attorneys that Chick-fil-A's objections would prevail. In 2014, the USPTO reversed its preliminary decision and ruled to give "Eat More Kale" trademark protection.

Muller-Moore's response to Chick-fil-A's trademark infringement accusations is now referenced in several academic discussions of intellectual property law and business ethics.

== Similar case ==
Chick-fil-A's approach drew comparisons to a 2009 dispute in which representatives of the Monster Energy beverage brand attempted to prevent Vermont's Rock Art Brewery from marketing a beer called "Vermonster." That dispute inspired a boycott of Monster drinks by one of Vermont's largest beverage outlets and legislation by Vermont's senators, Bernard Sanders and Patrick J. Leahy. Rock Art Brewery was ultimately able to continue to market Vermonster.
