= Bubba Cathy =

American businessman

- Born: Donald M. Cathy; 1953 or 1954 (age 72–73)
- Education: Samford University (BS)
- Occupations: Senior vice-president, Chick-fil-A; President, Dwarf House
- Spouse: Cindy Cathy (m. 1979)
- Children: 6
- Father: S. Truett Cathy
- Relatives: Dan T. Cathy (brother)

Donald M. "Bubba" Cathy (born 1953/1954) is an American billionaire businessman, EVP, Chairman, STC Brands & Chick-fil-A Ambassador of the fast-food chain Chick-fil-A, founded by his father, the late S. Truett Cathy. He is president of the sister restaurant line Dwarf House.

== Early life ==
Donald Cathy is the younger brother of Dan T. Cathy. Donald Cathy earned his bachelor's degree in marketing from Samford University.

== Career ==
Prior to college, Cathy operated the Chick-fil-A in Morrow, Georgia's Southlake Mall. In 1995, he was officially named as senior vice president of Chick-fil-A, Inc. In the early 21st century, he serves as executive vice president and president of the company's Georgia-based Dwarf House and Truett's Grill restaurant concepts.

== Personal life ==
Donald Cathy and his wife, Cindy, have six children and six grandchildren.
