= Dan Cathy =

American businessman (born 1953)

- Born: Daniel Truett Cathy; March 1, 1953 (age 73); Jonesboro, Georgia, U.S.
- Education: Georgia Southern University (BBA)
- Occupation: Chairman of Chick-fil-A
- Children: 2
- Father: S. Truett Cathy
- Relatives: Bubba Cathy (brother)

Daniel Truett Cathy (born March 1, 1953) is an American businessman. He is the chairman of fast-food chain Chick-fil-A, which was founded and expanded by his father, S. Truett Cathy. He has a net worth of $10.6 billion as of October 2024.

== Early life ==
Cathy was born in Jonesboro, Georgia, in 1953 as the first child of Jeanette (née McNeil) and S. Truett Cathy. His father had recently started a restaurant known as the Dwarf House. Cathy has a younger brother, Bubba Cathy and sister Trudy. In addition their family fostered numerous children over the years.

He began doing radio commercials for his father's original Dwarf House restaurant in Hapeville, Georgia, in the late 1960s while he was attending local schools. By that time, his father was establishing additional restaurants around Atlanta and Georgia as he created the franchise chain known as Chick-fil-A.

Cathy earned a bachelor's degree in business administration from Georgia Southern University in 1975. After graduation, he began working full-time for his father's company, which had already been established as a franchise chain.

== Career ==
Cathy started as director of operations, eventually being promoted in 2013 to chairman and CEO. Cathy spends much of his time visiting the chain's 3,503 restaurants. Dan Cathy in late 2021 stepped down as CEO of Chick-fil-A, Inc. but remained Chairman of the Board.

Cathy holds honorary doctorates from the University of West Georgia, Anderson College, Carver College, and Pepperdine University. His family runs the WinShape Foundation, a non-profit which supports a group of Southern Baptist ministries.

During a discussion at Atlanta's Passion City Church, Cathy told a story about racism and repentance. He then shined African American musician Lecrae Moore's sneakers, saying that the world needs to have an "apologetic heart."

== Views on same-sex marriage ==
Cathy said in July 2012 that he opposes same-sex marriage and supports conservative Christian causes. Tax records obtained in 2011 showed that Chick-fil-A's operators, the WinShape Foundation, and the Cathy family spent millions of dollars to defeat same-sex marriage initiatives and to provide conversion therapy.

In March 2014, Cathy told the Atlanta Journal-Constitution that it had been a "mistake" for the WinShape Foundation to "support political or social agendas" in the period before 2012, when this was reported and a national controversy broke out at a time of debate about same-sex marriages. Despite this statement, Cathy continued to contribute to campaigns focused on his ideological political agenda. He said:

While we evaluate individual donations on an annual basis, our giving is focused on three key areas: youth and education, leadership and family enrichment and serving the local communities in which we operate. Our intent is to not support political or social agendas. This has been the case for more than 60 years. The Chick-fil-A culture and service tradition in our restaurants is to treat every person with honor, dignity and respect and to serve great food with genuine hospitality.

In June 2021, The Daily Beast reported that the National Christian Charitable Foundation (NCF), to which Cathy is reportedly a major donor, was helping to fund opposition to the Equality Act.

== Personal life ==
Cathy is married with two children. He and his family live in Atlanta, Georgia.

== Honors ==
In 2022, he was inducted as a Georgia Trustee. The honor is given by the Georgia Historical Society, in conjunction with the Governor of Georgia, to individuals whose accomplishments and community service reflect the ideals of the founding body of Trustees, which governed the Georgia colony from 1732 to 1752.
