= S. Truett Cathy =

American restaurateur, businessman, philanthropist (1921-2014)

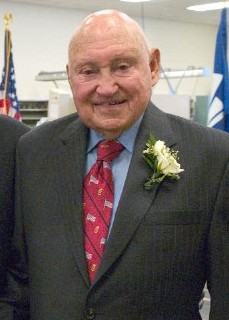
- Cathy in 2004
- Born: Samuel Truett Cathy; March 14, 1921; Eatonton, Georgia, U.S.
- Died: September 8, 2014 (aged 93); Clayton County, Georgia, U.S.
- Education: Boys High School
- Known for: Founder of Chick-fil-A; Founder of the WinShape Foundation
- Spouse: Jeannette McNeil Cathy (m. 1948)
- Children: Trudy; Dan; Bubba
- Military career
- Allegiance: United States
- Branch: United States Army
- Conflicts: World War II
- Website: www.truettcathy.com

Samuel Truett Cathy (March 14, 1921 – September 8, 2014) was an American businessman, investor, author, and philanthropist who founded the fast food restaurant chain Chick-fil-A in 1946.

== Early life ==
Cathy was born on March 14, 1921, in Eatonton, Georgia, the son of Lilla James (née Kimball) and Joseph Benjamin Cathy. He attended Boys High School in Atlanta and later served in the United States Army during World War II.

== Career ==
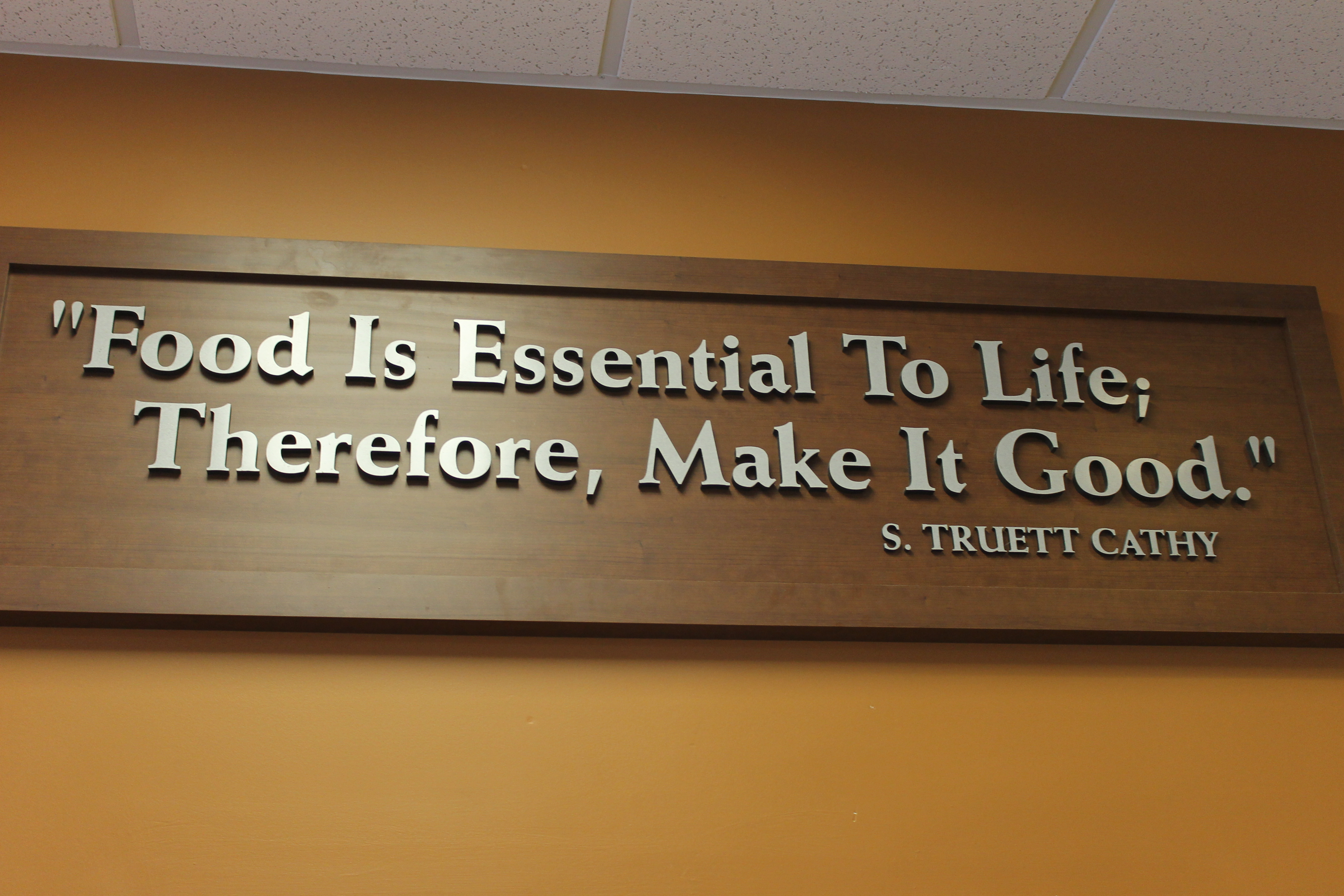
"Food Is Essential to Life", says Truett Cathy on sign in Chick-fil-A in San Antonio, Texas

Cathy began the Chick-fil-A restaurant chain in the Atlanta suburb of Hapeville in 1946 with a restaurant called the Dwarf Grill, named for its size. It was there that he, with his brother and business partner Ben, created the chicken sandwich that later became the signature menu item for Chick-fil-A. From 1964 to 1967, the sandwich was licensed to over fifty eateries, including Waffle House and the concession stands of the new Houston Astrodome. The Chick-Fil-A sandwich was withdrawn from sale at other restaurants when the first standalone location opened in 1967, in the food court of the Greenbriar Mall in Atlanta.

In April 2008, he opened Upscale Pizza in Fayetteville, Georgia. In November 2013, he retired as both chairman and CEO of Chick-fil-A, leaving his son, Dan Cathy, to assume the roles.

Cathy was closely involved in a sponsorship deal on the college football bowl game founded as the Peach Bowl; from 1997 to 2005, and again since 2014, it is known as the Chick-fil-A Peach Bowl, and was simply named the Chick-fil-A Bowl from 2006 to 2013.

== Personal life ==
He married Jeannette McNeil, and they had three children: Trudy, "Bubba" (Don), and Dan.

== Ministry ==
He taught Sunday school to teenagers at the First Baptist Church of Jonesboro, Georgia, for over 50 years.

== Beliefs ==
He said that the Bible is his guidebook for life. Due to his strong religious beliefs, all of the company's locations, whether company-owned or franchised, are closed on Sundays to allow its employees to attend church and spend time with their families. This policy began when Cathy was working multiple shifts, six days a week. He then decided to close on Sundays.

== Books ==
Cathy wrote five books: the autobiography Eat Mor Chikin: Inspire More People, a motivational book entitled It's Easier to Succeed Than to Fail, the parenting book It's Better to Build Boys Than Mend Men, an explanation of his business success in How Did You Do It, Truett?, and a final book on the significance of money in today's society titled Wealth, Is It Worth It?. He also contributed to the anthologies What My Parents Did Right and Conversations on Success, and co-wrote with Ken Blanchard Generosity Factor: Discover the Joy of Giving Your Time, Talent, and Treasure. McDonough-Fayetteville Road in Fayette, Henry, and Clayton counties, is named in his honor. Cathy said that the motivational book Think and Grow Rich by Napoleon Hill was one of the greatest foundations for inspiration growing up.

== Philanthropy ==
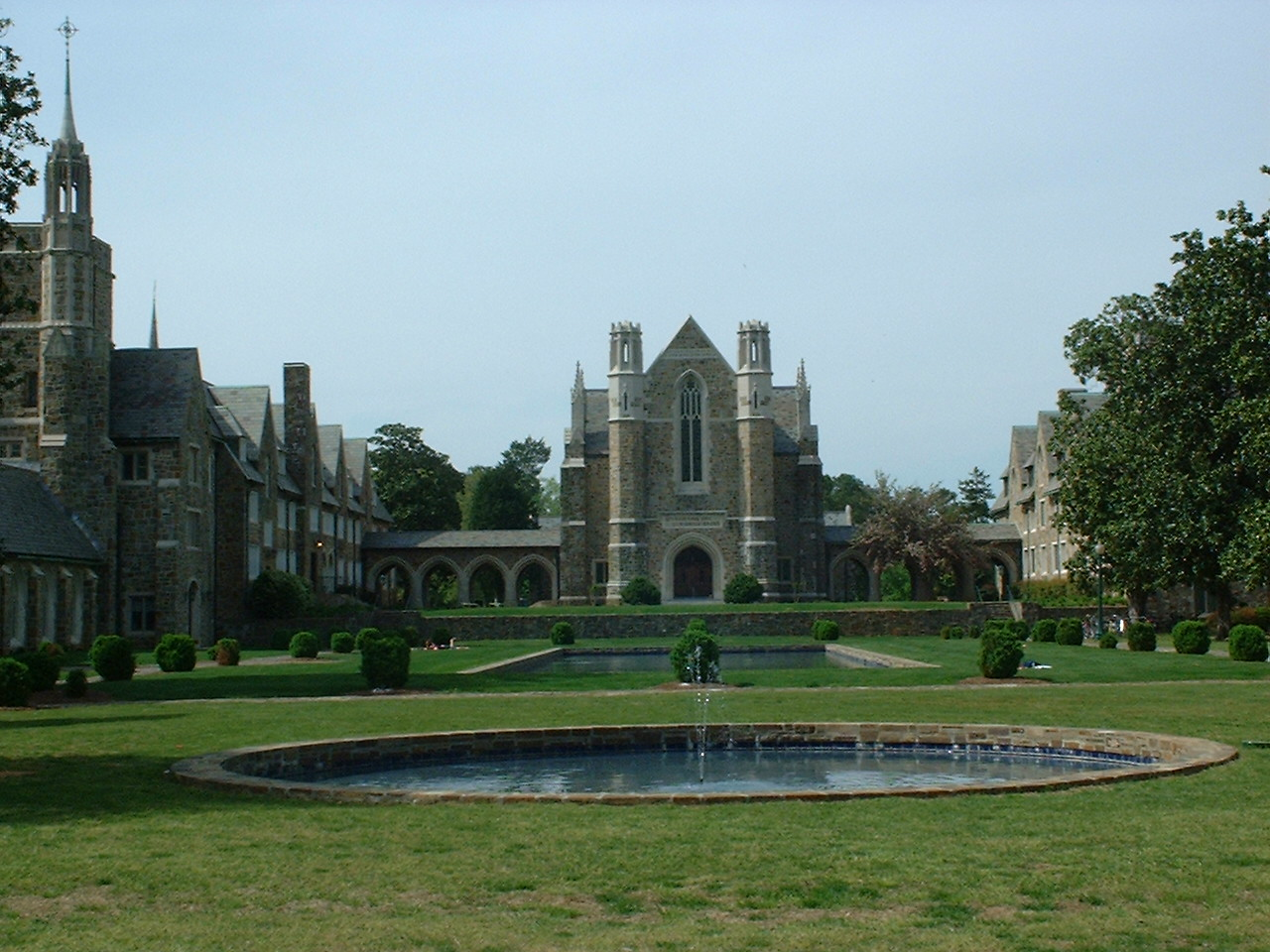
Summer camp for girls at Berry College

Cathy had a Leadership Scholarship program for Chick-fil-A restaurant employees, which has awarded more than $23 million in $1,000 scholarships in the past 35 years. In 1984, Cathy established the WinShape Foundation, named for its mission to shape winners. In addition, Cathy fostered children for more than 30 years. He received the William E. Simon Prize for Philanthropic Leadership in 2008.

== Death ==
Cathy died at his home on September 8, 2014, the age of 93 of complications from diabetes. The family held a public funeral service on Wednesday, September 10, at First Baptist Church, Jonesboro, Georgia. His interment was at Greenwood Cemetery.

His widow, Jeannette Cathy, died in 2015 at age 92.

== Honors and memberships ==
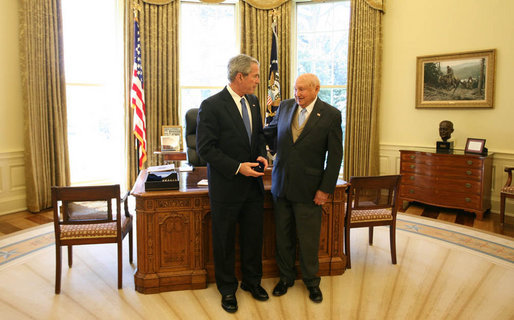
President George W. Bush stands with Truett Cathy after he received the Lifetime President's Volunteer Service Award at the White House in April 2008

Cathy received numerous honors, including membership in Omicron Delta Kappa (ΟΔΚ), the National Leadership Honor Society. He received ΟΔΚ's highest award, the Laurel Crowned Circle Award in 2009. He also received the Norman Vincent and Ruth Stafford Peale Humanitarian Award, the Horatio Alger Award, the William E. Simon Prize for Philanthropic Leadership, and the Boy Scouts of America Silver Buffalo Award. Cathy was inducted into the Junior Achievement U.S. Business Hall of Fame in 2003.

He was a member of the Pi Kappa Alpha and Delta Sigma Pi fraternities.

In 2007, Forbes magazine ranked Cathy as the 380th richest man in America and the 799th richest man in the world, with an estimated net worth of $1.2 billion.

President George W. Bush bestowed the President's Call to Service Award on Cathy in April 2008.

In 2013, he was inducted as a Georgia Trustee. The honor is given by the Georgia Historical Society, in conjunction with the Governor of Georgia, to individuals whose accomplishments and community service reflect the ideals of the founding body of Trustees, which governed the Georgia colony from 1732 to 1752.

=== Honorary doctorates ===
In 1997, he received an honorary degree in Doctor of Humane Letters from Oglethorpe University.

Cathy was inducted into the Indiana Wesleyan University Society of World Changers on April 3, 2011. In addition to being inducted into the Society, the university conferred upon Cathy an honorary doctorate of business.

In May 2012, Cathy received an honorary doctorate along with presidential candidate Mitt Romney at the Liberty University's spring commencement ceremony. In his remarks, Romney, the presumptive Republican presidential nominee at the time, said, "The Romney campaign comes to a sudden stop when we spot a Chick-fil-A. Your chicken sandwiches were our comfort food through the primary season, and heaven knows there were days that we needed a lot of comfort." Romney congratulated Cathy on his "well-deserved honor today".

== Publications ==
- Cathy, S. Truett (2010), Wealth, Is It Worth It?, Looking Glass Books, ISBN 978-1929619405
- —— (2007), How Did You Do It, Truett?: A Recipe for Success, Looking Glass Press, ISBN 978-1929619337
- —— (2004), It's Better to Build Boys Than Mend Men, Looking Glass Books, ISBN 1929619200
- —— (2002), Eat Mor Chikin: Inspire More People, Looking Glass Books, ISBN 1-929619-08-1
- —— (1989), It's Easier to Succeed Than to Fail, Thomas Nelson Inc., ISBN 0840790309
