= Chick-fil-A =

American fast food restaurant chain

Chick-fil-A, Inc.

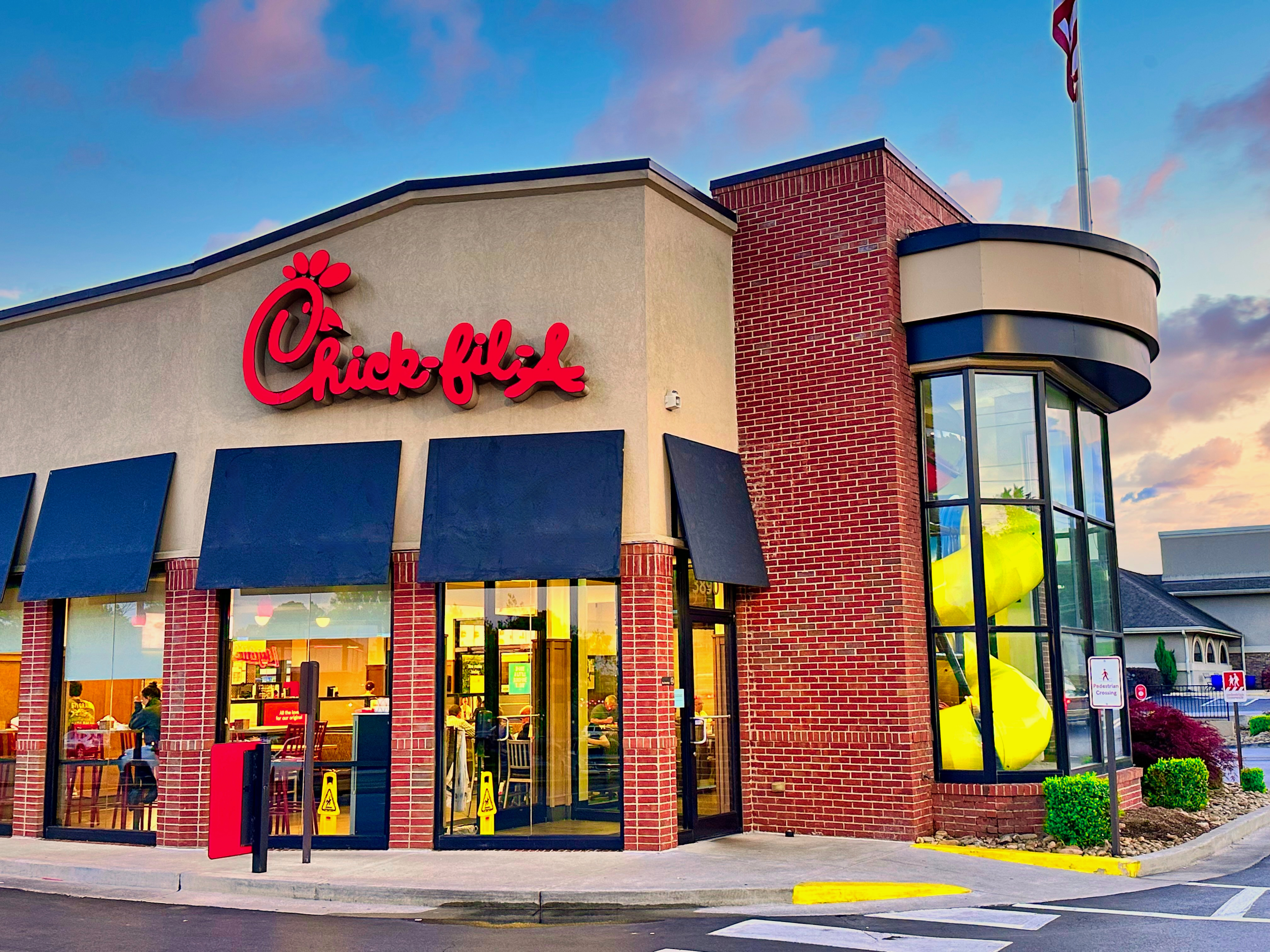
- location in Cleveland, Tennessee
- Formerly: Dwarf Grill; Dwarf House
- Type: Private
- Industry: Restaurants
- Founded: The Dwarf Grill: May 23, 1946; 80 years ago Hapeville, Georgia, U.S.; First franchise: November 24, 1967; 58 years ago Atlanta, Georgia, U.S.
- Founder: S. Truett Cathy
- Headquarters: 5200 Buffington Road; Atlanta, Georgia; 30349
- Number of locations: 3,488
- Area served: United States (including Puerto Rico); Canada; Singapore; United Kingdom
- Key people: Dan Cathy (chairman); Andrew T. Cathy (CEO); Bubba Cathy (EVP and president of Dwarf House); Trudy Cathy White (Ambassador)
- Products: Chicken sandwiches, chicken dishes
- Revenue: ▲US$21.6 billion (2023)
- Owner: Cathy family
- Number of employees: 35,574 as of August 2021
- Website: chick-fil-a.com chick-fil-a.ca chick-fil-a.pr chick-fil-a.co.uk chick-fil-a.com.sg

Chick-fil-A, Inc. (/ˌtʃɪkfɪˈleɪ/ CHIK-fil-AY, a play on the American English pronunciation of "filet") is an American fast food restaurant chain and the largest chain specializing in chicken sandwiches. Headquartered in College Park, Georgia, Chick-fil-A operates restaurants across 48 states, as well as in the District of Columbia and Puerto Rico. The company also has operations in Canada, the United Kingdom, and Singapore, and previously had restaurants in South Africa. The restaurant has a breakfast, a lunch, and a dinner menu. The chain also provides catering services. Chick-fil-A calls its specialty the "original chicken sandwich". It is a piece of deep-fried breaded boneless chicken breast served on a toasted bun with two slices of dill pickle, or with lettuce, tomato, and cheese.

Many of the company's values are influenced by the Christian religious beliefs of its late founder, S. Truett Cathy (1921–2014), a devout Southern Baptist. Reflecting a commitment to Sunday Sabbatarianism, all Chick-fil-A restaurants are closed for business on Sundays, and Christmas Day, as well as Thanksgiving for US and Canadian locations. (Note: The date of Thanksgiving is different in the US and Canada. British locations do not close on either day, while the sole location in Singapore closes on the first day of Chinese New Year instead.) The company's conservative opposition to same-sex marriage has caused controversy; the company began to loosen its stance on this issue from 2019. Even among numerous controversies and boycott attempts, the 2022 American Customer Satisfaction Index found that Chick-fil-A remained the country's favorite fast food chain for the eighth consecutive year, and it has the highest per store sales of any fast food chain in the nation.

== History ==
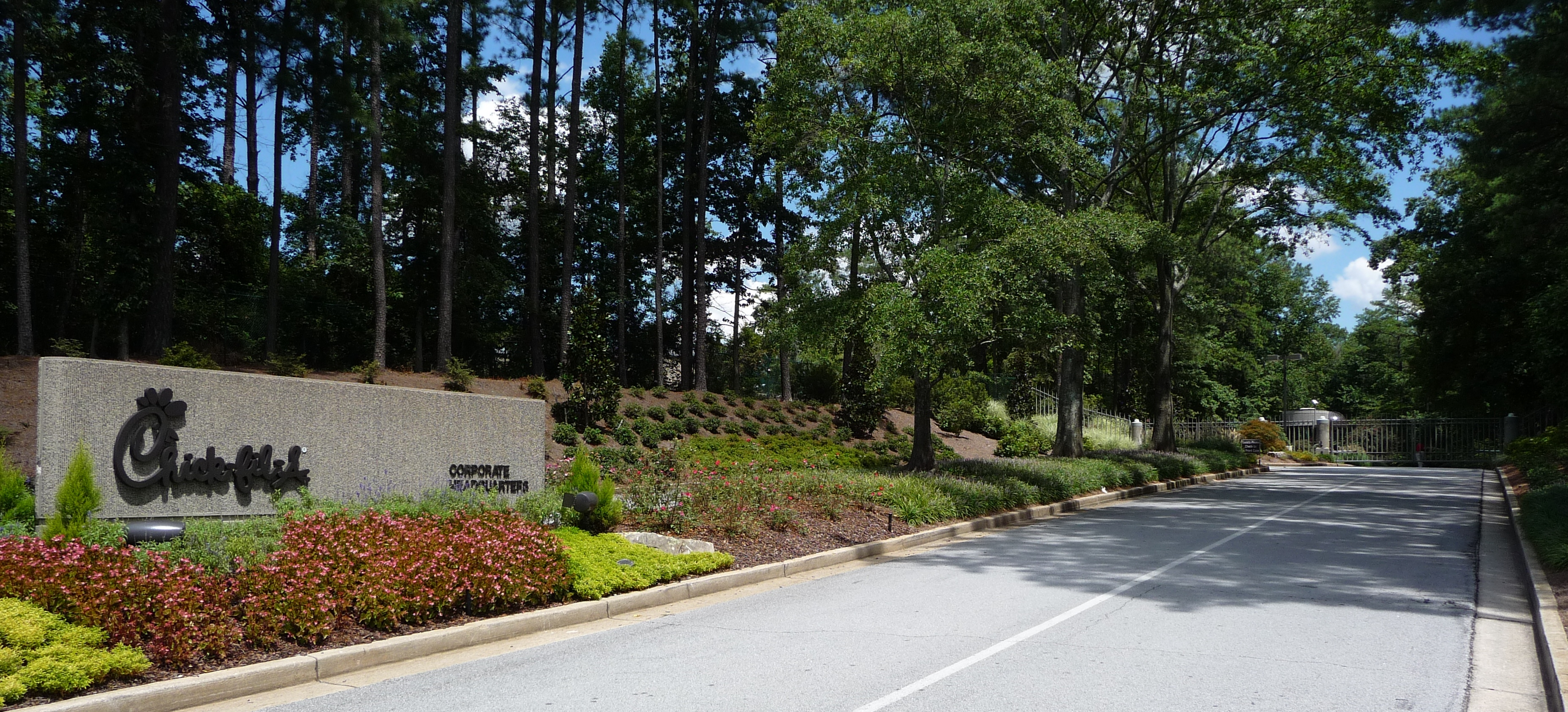
Chick-fil-A headquarters in College Park, Georgia

The chain's origin can be traced to the Dwarf Grill (now the Dwarf House), a restaurant opened by S. Truett Cathy (the chain's former chairman and CEO) in 1946 in the Atlanta suburb of Hapeville, Georgia. The original store was located near the Ford Motor Company Atlanta Assembly Plant, a source of many of the restaurant's patrons for years. It was later remodeled, reopening in 2022.

In 1961, after 15 years in the fast-food business, Cathy found a pressure fryer that could cook a chicken sandwich in the same time it took to cook a hamburger. Following this discovery, he registered the name Chick-fil-A, Inc. The company's trademarked slogan, "We Didn't Invent the Chicken, Just the Chicken Sandwich," refers to their flagship menu item, the Chick-fil-A chicken sandwich. Though Chick-fil-A was the first national chain to make a fast, fried chicken sandwich its flagship item, it has been shown that Cathy's claim to have "invented the chicken sandwich" is false.

From 1964 to 1967, the sandwich was licensed to over fifty eateries, including Waffle House and the concession stands of the new Houston Astrodome. The Chick-Fil-A sandwich was withdrawn from sale at other restaurants when the first dedicated location opened in 1967, in the food court of the Greenbriar Mall in Atlanta.

The chain expanded in the 1970s and early 1980s by opening new locations in suburban malls' food courts. The first freestanding location was opened April 16, 1986, on North Druid Hills Road in Atlanta, Georgia, and the company began to focus more on stand-alone units rather than food courts. Although it has expanded outward from its original geographic base, most new restaurants are located in suburban areas of the Southern US.

Since 1997, the Atlanta-based company has sponsored the Peach Bowl, an annual college football bowl game played in Atlanta on New Year's Eve. Chick-fil-A also sponsors the Southeastern Conference and the Atlantic Coast Conference of college athletics.

In 2008, Chick-fil-A was among the first fast-food restaurants to become completely free of trans fats.

In October 2015, the company opened its largest restaurant, a three-story 5,000 square feet (460 m^{2}) restaurant in Manhattan.

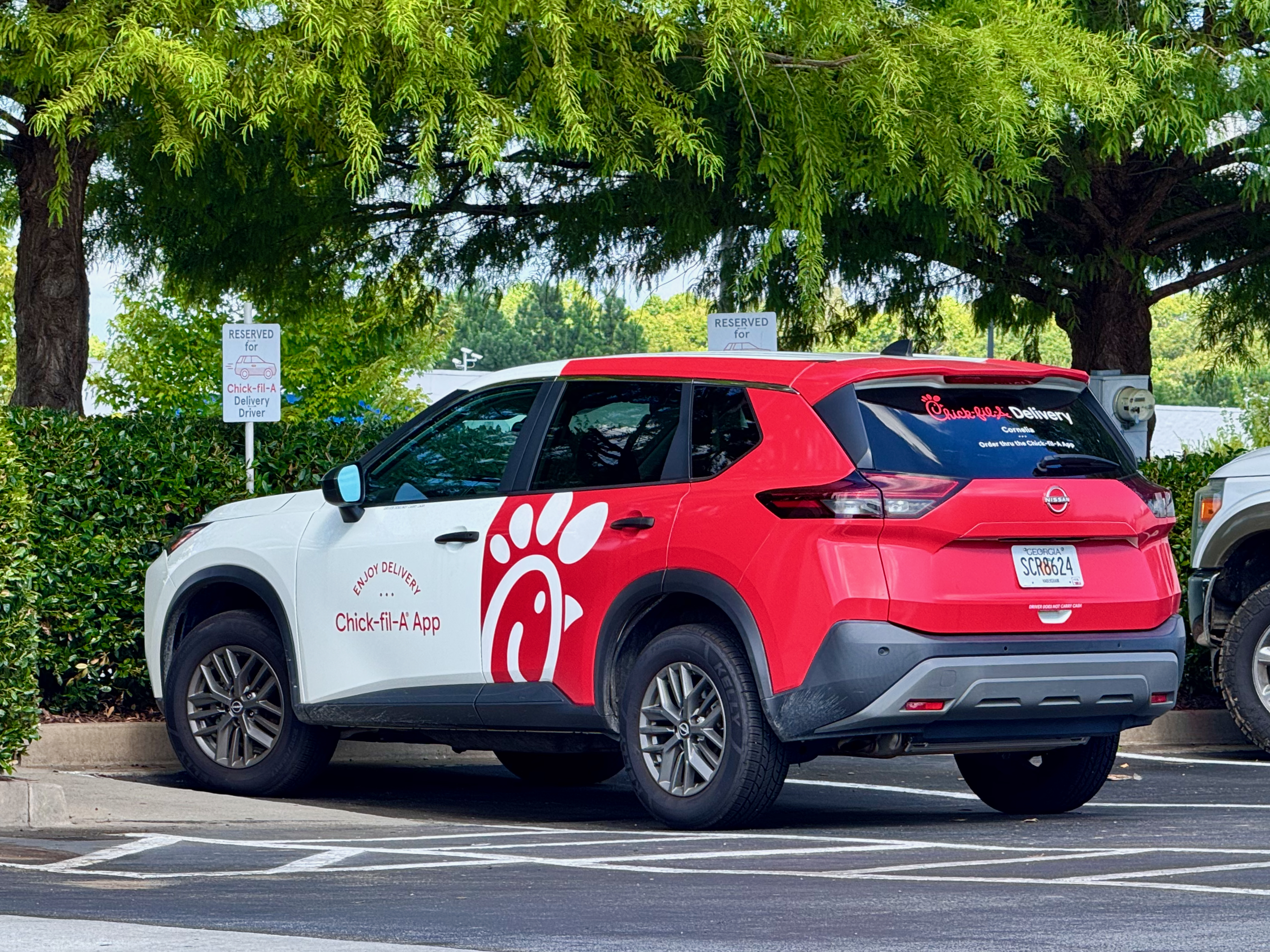
A Chick-fil-A delivery vehicle

On December 17, 2017, Chick-fil-A broke their tradition and opened on a Sunday to prepare meals for passengers left stranded during a power outage at Atlanta Hartsfield-Jackson International Airport; further, on January 13, 2019, a Chick-fil-A franchise in Mobile, Alabama, opened on Sunday to honor a birthday wish of a 14-year-old boy with cerebral palsy and autism.

On February 13, 2023, they began offering their first non-meat sandwich, a breaded cauliflower sandwich.

In May 2023, Chick-fil-A closed its original location in Greenbriar Mall, without stating a reason.

On January 5, 2026, Chick-fil-A introduced their "Frosted Sodas and Floats" brand, blending any soft drink with vanilla soft serve ice cream, in celebration of the company's 80th anniversary. The company also released options for customers to brand wrappers and cups in a "retro-style".

== Business model ==
A Chick-fil-A restaurant in Cornelia, Georgia

Chick-fil-A's business strategy involves a focus on a small menu and on customer service. While many fast food chains offer many dishes, Chick-fil-A's is focused on selling chicken sandwiches. The name's capital A is intended to indicate that their chicken is "grade A top quality". The company's emphasis on customer service is reported to have contributed to its success and growth in the United States.

Chick-fil-A builds and owns its restaurants. Chick-fil-A franchisees need a US$10,000 initial investment. Franchisees are selected and trained, a process that can take months.

Chick-fil-A grossed an average of $6.71 million per restaurant in 2022, despite opening only 6 days a week, the highest sales of all fast-food restaurants in the United States. (Raising Cane's was second with $5.44 million per restaurant average).

In 2019, Chick-fil-A reported $11.3 billion in sales in the United States, behind only McDonald's with $40.4 billion in sales that year.

To compete with Chick-fil-A, the fried chicken chain Popeyes, followed by others, introduced a fried chicken sandwich in 2019, a marketing trend known as the chicken sandwich wars.

=== Retail sale of sauces ===
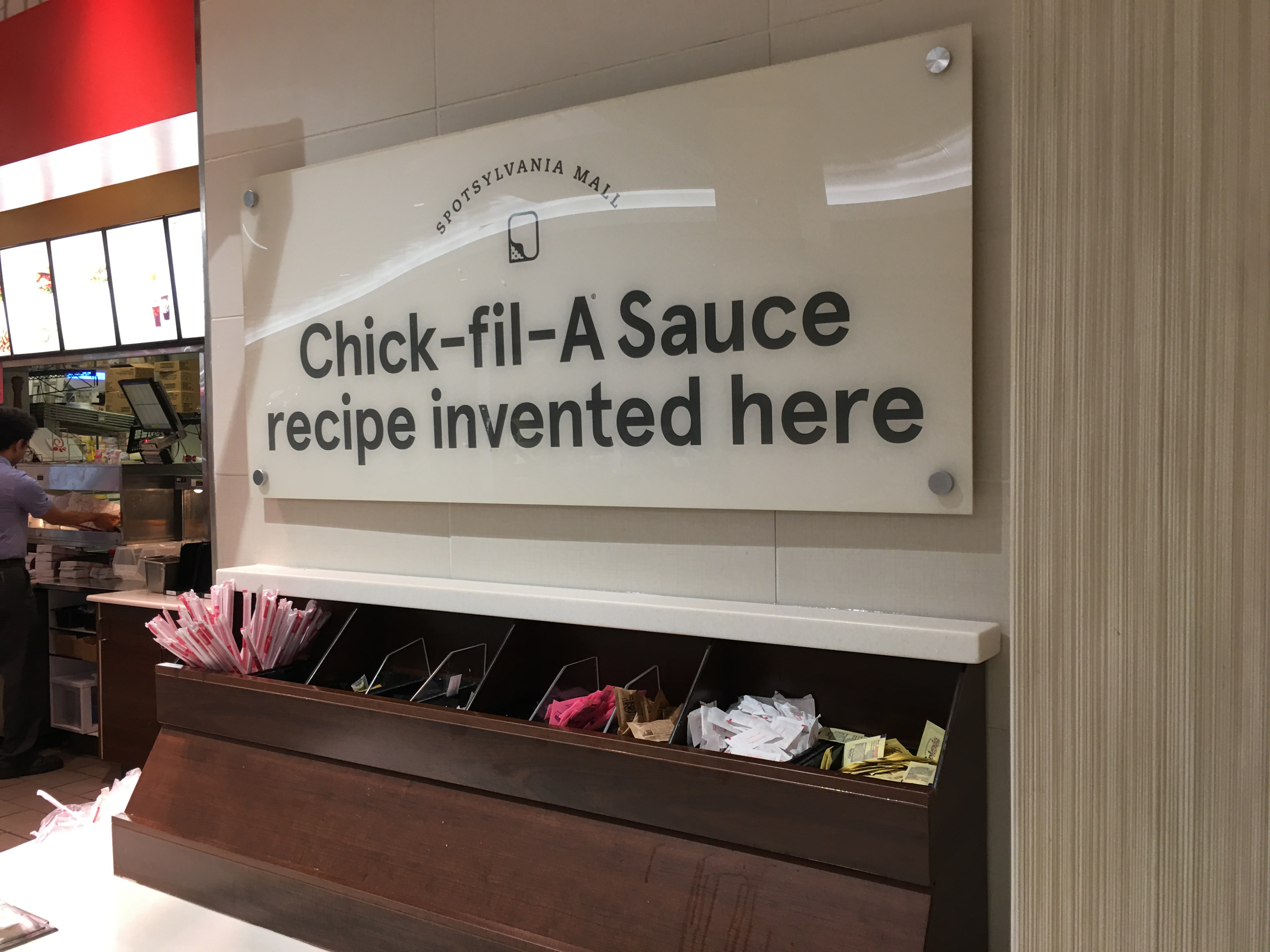
Sign posted at the Spotsylvania Towne Centre Chick-fil-A location in Fredericksburg, Virginia. Chick-fil-A Sauce was invented at this location in 1983.

In the spring of 2020, Chick-fil-A test-trialed the sale of two of their dipping sauces at some supermarkets in Florida, with all profits earmarked for a scholarship fund for the company's store-level employees. The trial was considered successful, and distribution was expanded nationwide by 2021. Two more sauces were added in 2023.

In October 2022, the company trialed expansion of the program to include its salad dressings in the Cincinnati metropolitan area and in parts of Tennessee, and expanded nationwide in spring 2023.

In January 2025, Chick-fil-A announced plans to centralize its lemonade production by moving it from its restaurant locations to a single, automated facility in Santa Clarita, California. This new plant is capable of processing between 30 and 35 truckloads of lemons daily, with each truckload containing 50,000 pounds of lemons.

== Financial performance ==
In 2024, Chick-fil-A reported systemwide sales of $22 billion, ranking it among the top three U.S. restaurant chains by sales, alongside McDonald's ($53.5 billion) and Starbucks ($30.4 billion). The chain achieved this with 3,109 locations, compared to McDonald's 13,559 U.S. locations. Chick-fil-A's average unit volume was $7.5 million per location, the highest among major U.S. fast-food chains.

== Corporate culture ==
S. Truett Cathy was a devout Southern Baptist; his religious beliefs had a major impact on the company. The company's official statement of corporate purpose says that the business exists "To glorify God by being a faithful steward of all that is entrusted to us. To have a positive influence on all who come in contact with Chick-fil-A." Cathy opposed the company becoming public for religious and personal reasons.

A company spokesperson said in 2012, "The Chick-fil-A culture and service tradition in our Restaurants is to treat every person with honor, dignity, and respect –regardless of their belief, race, creed, sexual orientation, or gender."

=== Sunday closing ===
In accordance with the founder's belief in the Christian doctrine of first-day Sabbatarianism, all Chick-fil-A locations are closed on Sundays, Thanksgiving, and Christmas. Cathy said "Our decision to close on Sunday was our way of honoring God and of directing our attention to things that mattered more than our business."

In an interview with ABC News's Nightline, Truett's son Dan T. Cathy told reporter Vicki Mabrey that the company is also closed on Sundays because "by the time Sunday came, he was just worn out. And Sunday was not a big trading day, anyway, at the time. So he was closed that first Sunday and we've been closed ever since. He figured if he didn't like working on Sundays, that other people didn't either."

Even Chick-fil-A locations at sports stadiums close on Sundays, although many games are played on Sundays.

=== Drive-through traffic ===
The popularity of Chick-fil-A's drive-throughs in the United States has led to traffic problems, police interventions, and complaints by neighboring businesses in more than 20 states. The long drive-through lines have been reported to cause traffic backups, blocking emergency vehicles and city buses, and increasing the risk of collisions and pedestrian injuries.

In 2025, the company reported that up to 60% of its sales are from drive-through traffic.

=== Lenten observance ===
During the Western Christian liturgical season of Lent, Chick-fil-A has in the past promoted fish sandwiches, following the Christian tradition of abstinence from meat during Lent. They no longer offer this product.

=== Serving chicken without antibiotics ===
In February 2014, Chick-fil-A announced plans to serve chicken raised without antibiotics in its restaurants nationwide within five years, the first fast-food restaurant to make this commitment. This was implemented by May 2019. Later the company stated that "to maintain supply of the high-quality chicken", they would shift from a policy of No Antibiotics Ever (NAE) to No Antibiotics Important To Human Medicine (NAIHM) starting in the spring of 2024. In March 2024, Chick-fil-A announced it would depart from the company's previous commitment of using only "antibiotic-free" chicken.

=== Removal of additives ===
In 2011, food blogger and activist Vani Hari noted that Chick-fil-A sandwiches contained nearly 100 ingredients, including peanut oil preserved with tert-butylhydroquinone (TBHQ), made from butane. In October 2012, Chick-fil-A invited Hari to meet with company executives at its headquarters. In December 2013, Chick-fil-A said that it was removing high-fructose corn syrup and artificial dyes, and was testing a new peanut oil. Like other companies, Chick-fil-A does not publicly announce such changes unless already in the news, because it focuses on these ingredients.

=== Cage-free eggs ===
In 2016, Chick-fil-A pledged to use only cage-free eggs by 2026. In 2025, the company backtracked from this commitment, citing barriers such as industry dynamics and bird flu.

== International locations ==
=== Canada ===
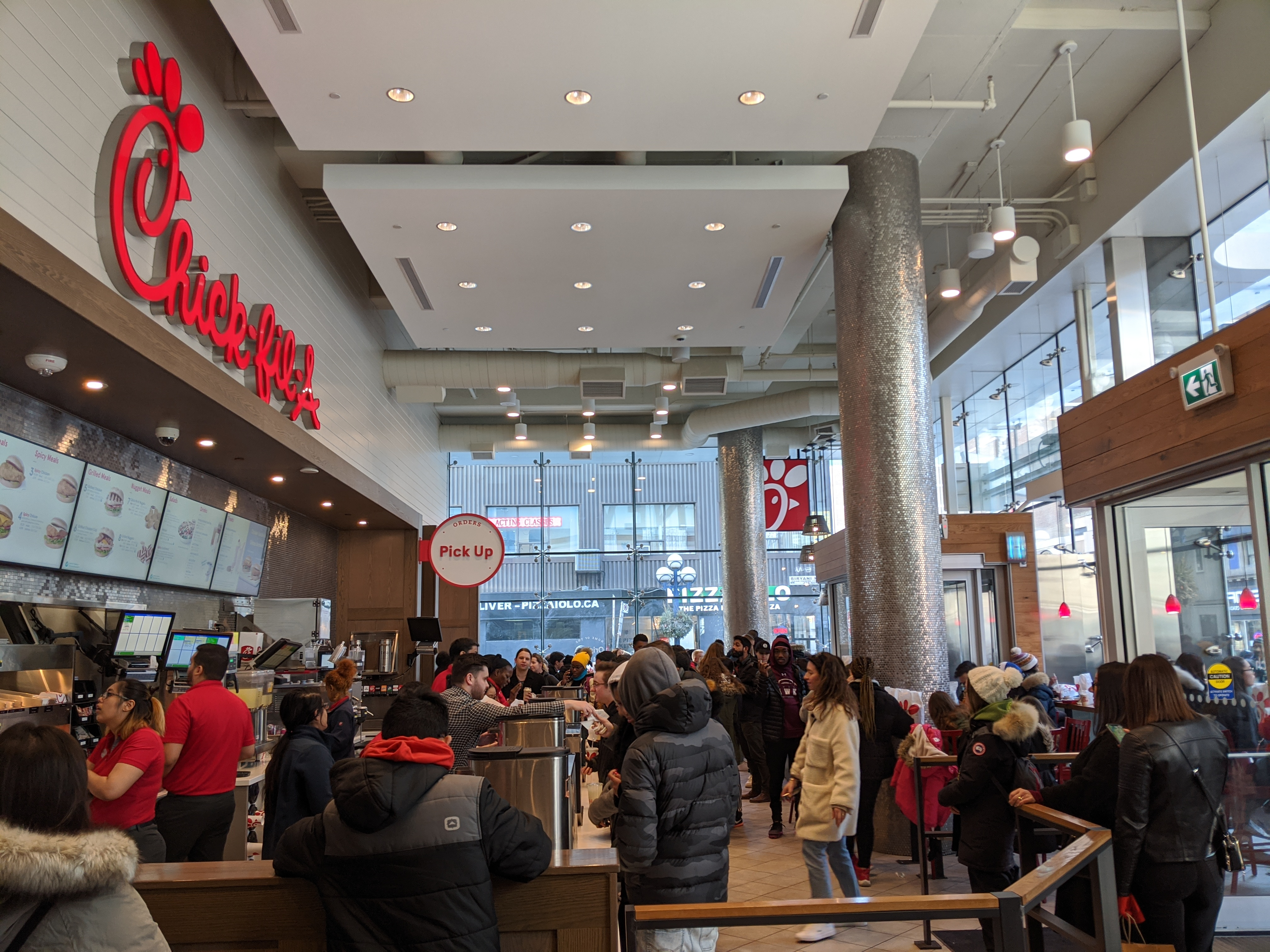
Chick-fil-A at One Bloor in Toronto

Chick-fil-A was first introduced into the Canadian market in 1981. They opened their first locations in Oakville Place, and Burlington Centre in Ontario. These locations would later close, however it is not clear when they were shuttered. In September 1994, Chick-fil-A re-entered Canada inside a student centre food court at the University of Alberta in Edmonton, Alberta. This location did not perform very well and was closed within two or three years. The company opened an outlet at the Calgary International Airport in Alberta in May 2014, and closed it in 2019.

Chick-fil-A opened a restaurant in Toronto, Ontario, on September 6, 2019, in the Yonge and Bloor Street area. There were protests criticizing the company's violation of animal rights and "history of supporting anti-LGBTQ causes". Chick-fil-A announced that it would open two other locations in Toronto during 2019, and 12 additional stores in the Greater Toronto Area over the subsequent five years. The chain's second Toronto location opened at the Yorkdale Shopping Centre in January 2020.

The company expanded to other areas of Ontario in 2021, opening standalone locations with drive-through restaurants in Kitchener in August and Windsor in October.

In November 2023, the first standalone with drive-through location in London was opened on Wonderland Road South.

In 2024, the company opened locations in Alberta, one being in the Phase III food court of West Edmonton Mall in Edmonton. and the other being in Calgary located on Macleod Trail.

In 2025, despite freezing cold, hundreds of customers started lining up outside the restaurant as early as five in the morning in Cambridge, Ontario. Later that year, construction of a second London location on Richmond Street across from Masonville Mall was completed in September.

=== South Africa ===
In August 1996, Chick-fil-A opened its first location outside of North America by building a restaurant in Durban, South Africa. A second location was opened in Johannesburg in November 1997. Neither was profitable, and they were closed in 2001.

=== United Kingdom ===
A Chick-fil-A operated in Edinburgh during the Spring of 2018. On October 10, 2019, Chick-fil-A returned to Europe, with the opening of a store at The Oracle shopping centre in Reading, UK. The store closed in March 2020 after The Oracle opted not to continue the lease of the location beyond the six-month pilot period in the face of continued protests over the chain's anti-LGBTQ stance.

In February 2019, Chick-fil-A opened a store on a 12-month pilot scheme in Aviemore, Scotland. The store was closed in January 2020 amidst protests and controversy from locals and customers regarding the chain's former donations to charities supporting anti-LGBT rights causes. Chick-fil-A said that they had always planned a short-term stay at the location.

Later, the company changed some policies, appointing its first head of diversity in 2020, and focused its charitable activities on education and hunger alleviation rather than opponents of same-sex marriage. In September 2023, the company planned to open five restaurants in the UK from early 2025, investing over $100M over the following ten years in the UK. The chain said that it would apply its charitable policies, including a $25,000 donation to a local organization on opening a Chick-fil-A restaurant and donation of surplus food to local charitable causes, to its UK branches too.

Chick-fil-A have opened their first full UK restaurant in Lisburn, Northern Ireland in January 2025, followed by a second one in Templepatrick, Northern Ireland in February 2025 under a partnership with Applegreen. A third location in Leeds, West Yorkshire opened in October 2025. Another location in Kingston upon Thames, London opened in March 2026.

=== Puerto Rico ===
Chick-fil-A opened its first location in Puerto Rico in 2022 and by 2024 had expanded to seven restaurants, with the plan for up to 25 locations by 2030. The unique menu includes coffee 100% grown and roasted in Puerto Rico.

=== Expansion to Asia and Europe ===
Chick-fil-A CEO Andrew Cathy announced in March 2023 that it planned to open restaurants in Asia and Europe by 2026, and was set to expand to five overseas markets by 2030. The Wall Street Journal reported that it was seeking countries with "stable economies, dense populations, and a demand for chicken".

==== Singapore ====
Chick-fil-A opened a pop-up restaurant at Esplanade Mall for three days from June 26 through 28, 2024, being the first Asian country to host a Chick-fil-A pop-up. On October 17, 2024, Chick-fil-A officially announced it would be opening in Singapore in late 2025, making the first Asian country to open the brand, and would be investing US$75 million into its first restaurant in the country for 10 years. The restaurant opened on December 11, 2025.

== Advertising ==
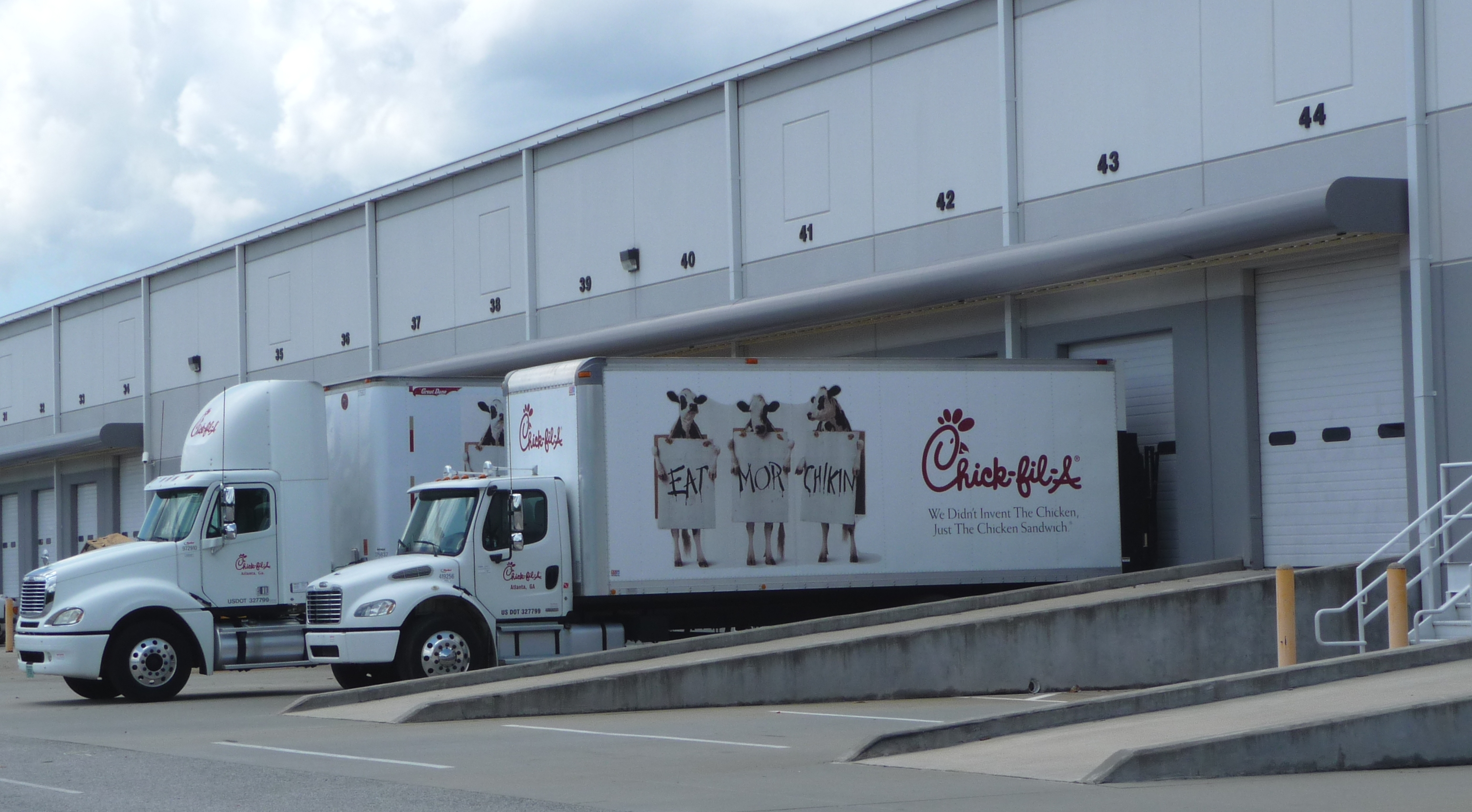
Chick-fil-A trucks displaying the "Eat Mor Chikin" slogan

"Eat Mor Chikin" is the chain's most prominent advertising slogan, created by The Richards Group in 1995. The slogan is often seen in advertisements featuring Holstein dairy cows that are often seen wearing (or holding) signs that (usually) read "Eat Mor Chikin" in capital letters. The ad campaign was temporarily halted on January 1, 2004, during a mad cow disease scare, so as not to make the chain seem insensitive or appear to be taking advantage of the scare to increase its sales. Two months later, the cows were put up again. The cows replaced the chain's old mascot, Doodles, an anthropomorphized chicken that still appears as the C on the logo.

Chick-fil-A vigorously protects its intellectual property, sending cease and desist letters to those they think have infringed on their trademarks. The corporation has successfully protested at least 30 instances of the use of an "eat more" phrase, saying that the use would cause confusion of the public, dilute the distinctiveness of their intellectual property, and diminish its value.

A 2011 letter to Vermont artist Bo Muller-Moore who screen prints T-shirts reading: "Eat More Kale" demanded that he cease printing the shirts and turn over his website. The incident drew criticism from Vermont governor Peter Shumlin, and created backlash against what he termed Chick-fil-A's "corporate bullying". On December 11, 2014, Bo Muller-Moore announced that the U.S. Patent Office granted his application to trademark his "Eat More Kale" phrase. A formal announcement of his victory took place on December 12, 2014, with Shumlin and other supporters on the Statehouse steps. His public fight drew regional and national attention, the support of Shumlin, and a team of pro-bono law students from the University of New Hampshire legal clinic.

After 22 years with The Richards Group, Chick-fil-A switched to McCann New York in 2016. Along with the cows, ads included famous people in history in a campaign called "Chicken for Breakfast. It's not as crazy as you think."

== Sponsored events ==
Chick-fil-A Classic
The Chick-fil-A Classic is a high school basketball tournament held in Columbia, South Carolina, featuring nationally ranked players and teams. The tournament is co-sponsored by the Greater Columbia Educational Advancement Foundation (GCEAF), which provides scholarships to high school seniors in the greater Columbia area.

Chick-fil-A Peach Bowl
The Chick-fil-A Peach Bowl, first known as the Peach Bowl until 2006 and renamed Chick-fil-A Peach Bowl in 2014, is a college football bowl game played each year in Atlanta, Georgia.

Chick-fil-A Kickoff Game
The Chick-fil-A Kickoff Game is an annual early-season college football game played at the Mercedes-Benz Stadium in Atlanta, Georgia; before 2017, it was played at the Georgia Dome. It features two highly ranked teams, one of which has always been from the Southeastern Conference. The event was expanded to two games in the 2012 season and again in the 2014 season. It was also two games in 2017. On July 12, 2023, Georgia-based insurance company Aflac, became the new sponsor of the game.

== Same-sex marriage ==
Chick-fil-A has donated over $5 million, via the WinShape Foundation, to groups that oppose same-sex marriage. In response, students at several colleges and universities worked to ban or remove the company's restaurants from their campuses.

In June and July 2012, Chick-fil-A's chief operating officer Dan T. Cathy made several public statements about same-sex marriage, saying that those who "have the audacity to define what marriage is about" were "inviting God's judgment on our nation". Several prominent politicians expressed disapproval. Boston Mayor Thomas Menino and Chicago Alderman Proco "Joe" Moreno said they hoped to block franchise expansion into their areas. The proposed local bans drew criticism from liberal pundits, legal experts, and the American Civil Liberties Union.

The Jim Henson Company, which had a Pajanimals kids' meal toy licensing arrangement with Chick-fil-A, said it would cease its business relationship, and donate the payment to the Gay & Lesbian Alliance Against Defamation. Chick-fil-A stopped distributing the toys, claiming that unrelated safety concerns had arisen before the controversy. Chick-fil-A released a statement on July 31, 2012, saying, "We are a restaurant company focused on food, service, and hospitality; our intent is to leave the policy debate over same-sex marriage to the government and political arena."

In response to the controversy, former Arkansas Governor Mike Huckabee initiated a Chick-fil-A Appreciation Day movement to counter a boycott of Chick-fil-A launched by same-sex marriage activists. Many of the chain's stores reported record levels of customers that day. The United States Federal Aviation Administration also responded to two cities that were preventing Chick-fil-A from opening in their international airport, citing "Federal requirements prohibit airport operators from excluding persons on the basis of religious creed from participating in airport activities that receive or benefit from FAA grant funding."

In April 2018, Chick-fil-A reportedly continued to donate to the Fellowship of Christian Athletes, which opposes gay marriage. In a November 18, 2019 interview, Chick-fil-A president Tim Tassopoulos said the company would stop donating to the Salvation Army and the Fellowship of Christian Athletes.

== Related restaurants ==
=== Hapeville Dwarf House ===
Truett Cathy opened his first restaurant in 1946, The Dwarf Grill – later renamed the Dwarf House – in Hapeville, Georgia, and developed the pressure-cooked chicken breast sandwich there. At the original Chick-fil-A Dwarf Grill, there is also an extra small-sized front door in addition to the full-size entrances.

The original Dwarf House in Hapeville, Georgia. It has a larger dine-in menu than the other Dwarf House locations, and an animated seven-dwarf display is at the back of the restaurant.

=== Dwarf House ===
Opened in 1986, Truett's original, full-service restaurants offer a substantial menu and provide customers with table service, walk-up counter service, or a drive-thru window. There are five of the original eleven Chick-fil-A Dwarf House restaurants still operating in the metro Atlanta area, including Riverdale, Jonesboro, Forest Park and Fayetteville.

=== Truett's Grill ===
In 1996, the first Truett's Grill was opened in Morrow, Georgia. The second location opened in 2003 in McDonough, Georgia, and a third location opened in 2006 in Griffin, Georgia. Similar to the Chick-fil-A Dwarf Houses, these independently owned restaurants offer traditional, sit-down dining and expanded menu selections in a diner-themed restaurant. In 2017, Chick-fil-A demolished several Dwarf House locations to replace them with Truett's Grill locations.

=== Truett's Chick-fil-A ===
Truett's Chick-fil-A is designed in honor of founder S. Truett Cathy. The restaurant is decorated with family photos and favorite quotes of the restaurant founder. The restaurant offers drive-thru, counter, and sit-down service for breakfast, lunch, and dinner. There are four locations including Newnan, Rome, Stockbridge, Loganville and Woodstock, Georgia.

=== Truett's Luau ===
Truett Cathy visited Hawaii; at the age of 92, he opened Truett's Luau in Fayetteville, Georgia, in 2013.

Dwarf House and Truett's Grill in Griffin, Georgia
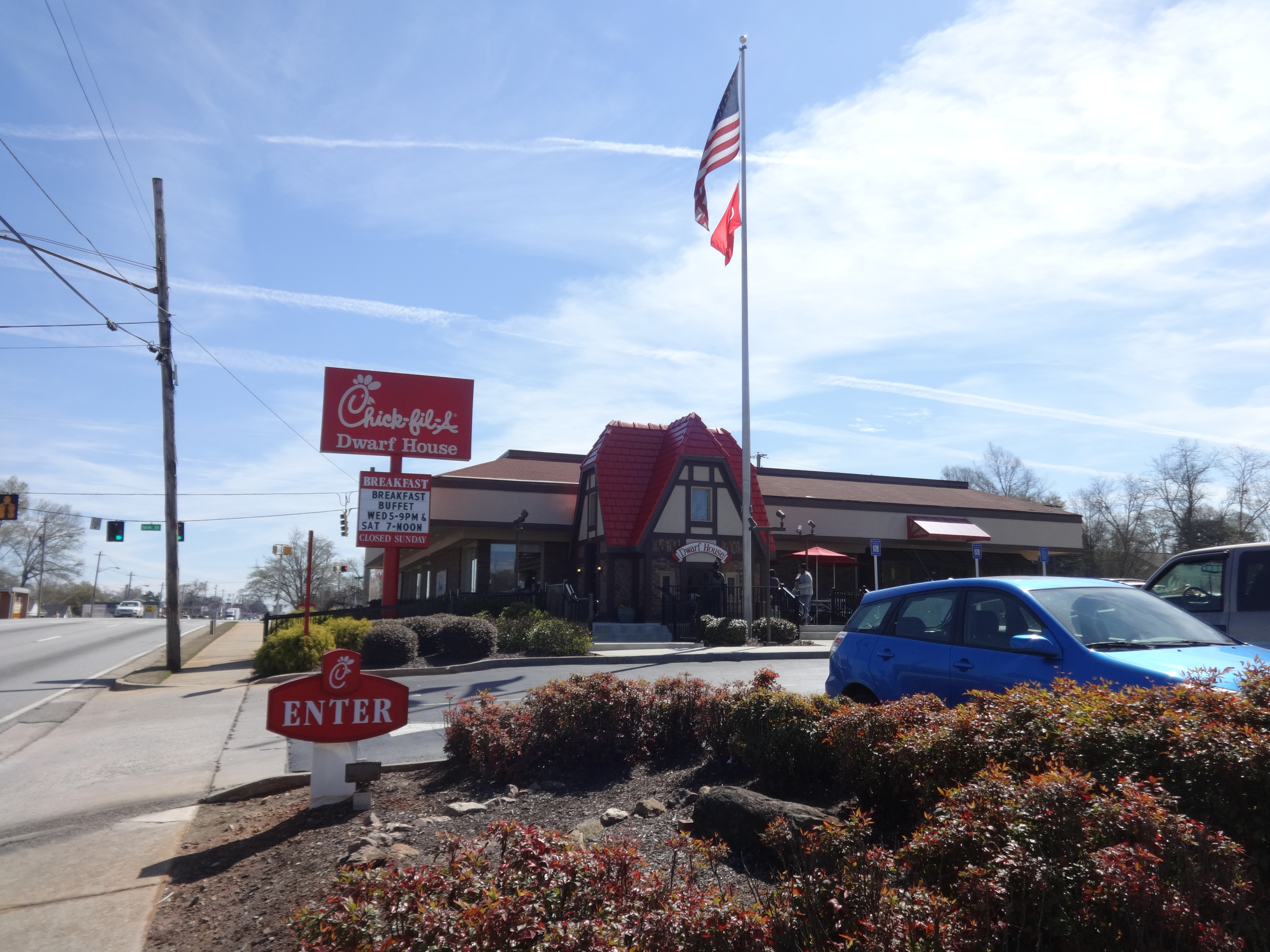
Chick-fil-a Dwarf House entrance, Griffin, Spalding County, Georgia

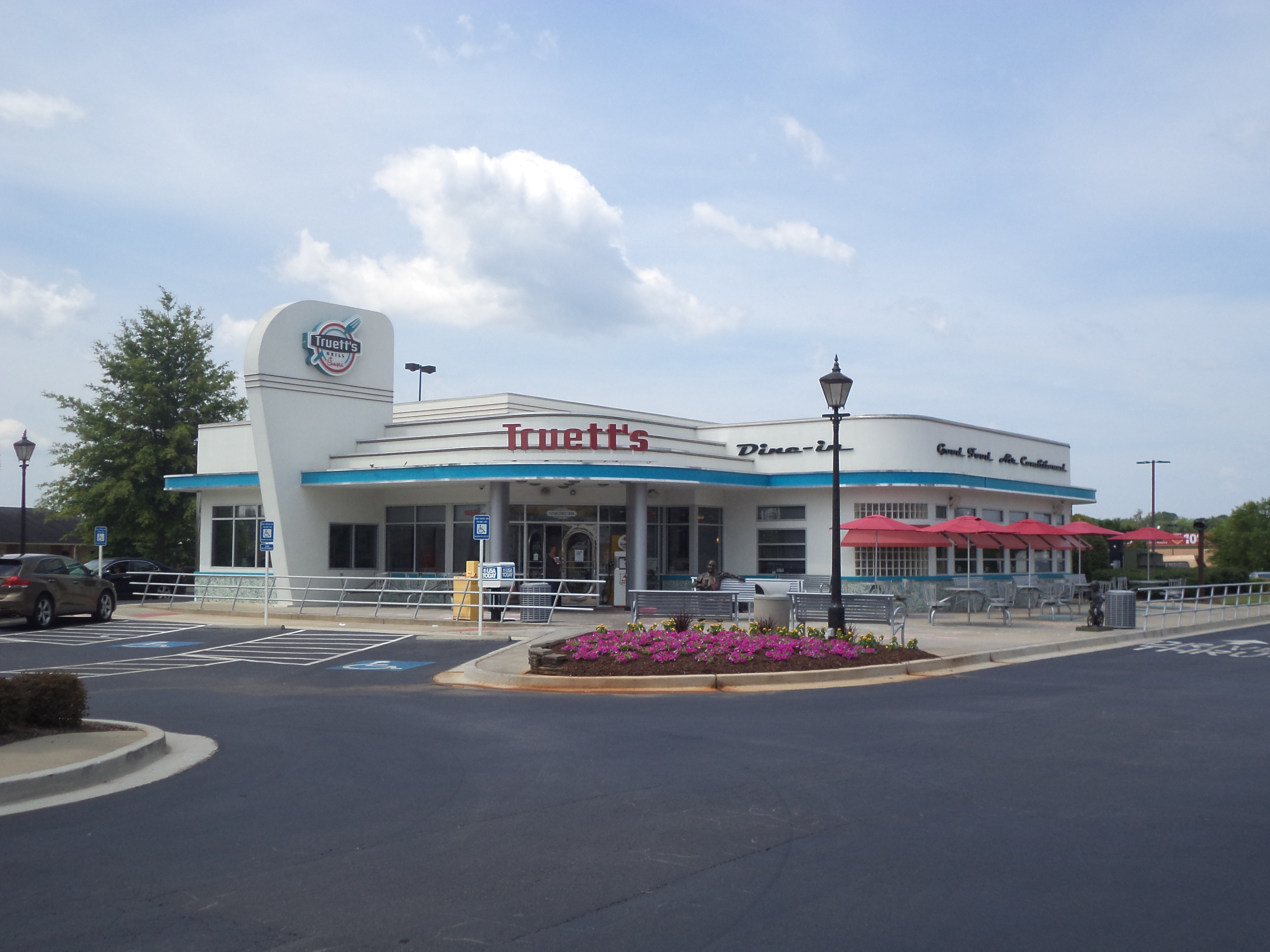
Truett's Grill, 1455 N Express Way, Griffin, Spalding County, Georgia

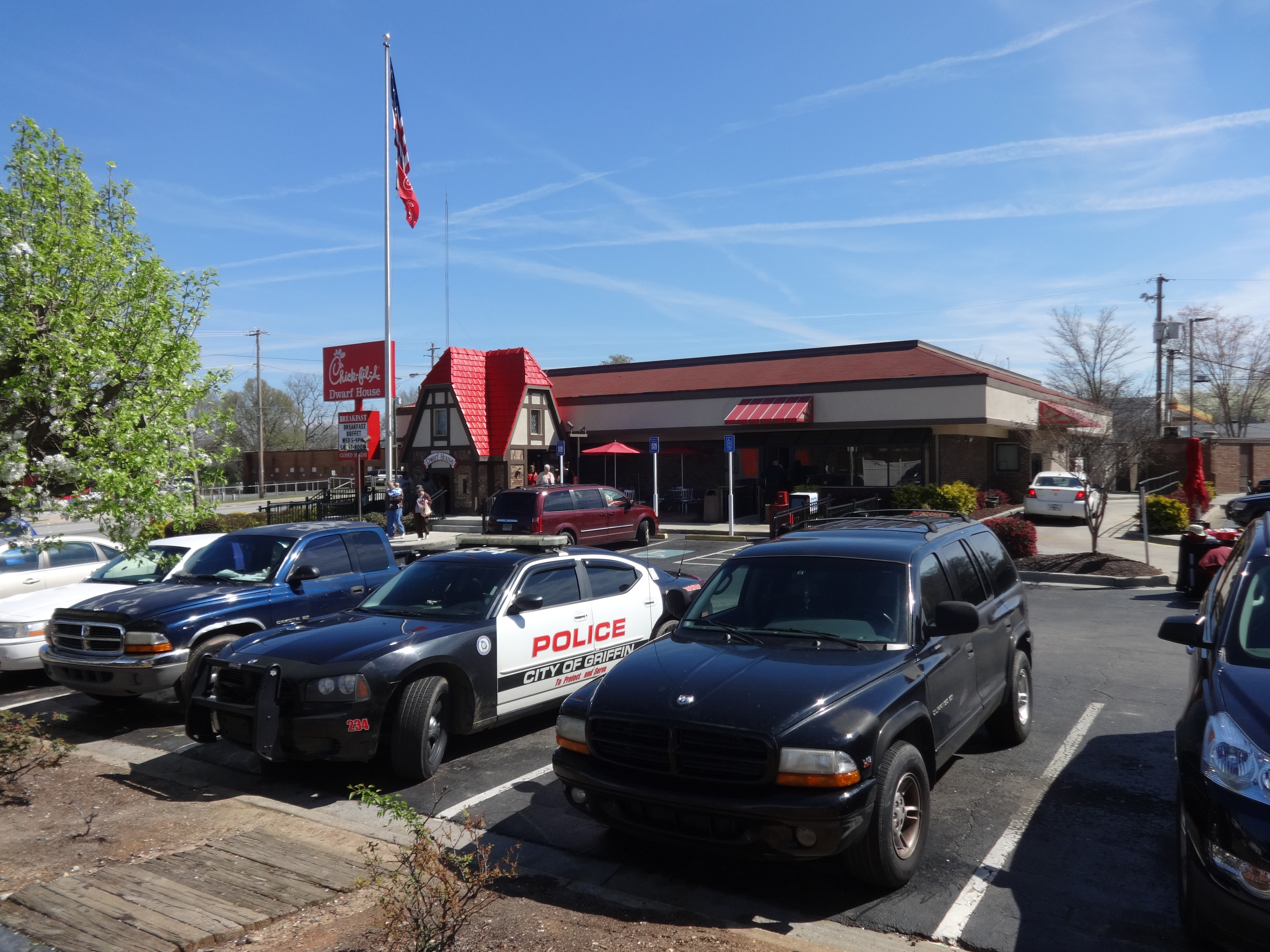
Chick-fil-a Dwarf House, Griffin, Spalding County, Georgia

== Senior leadership ==
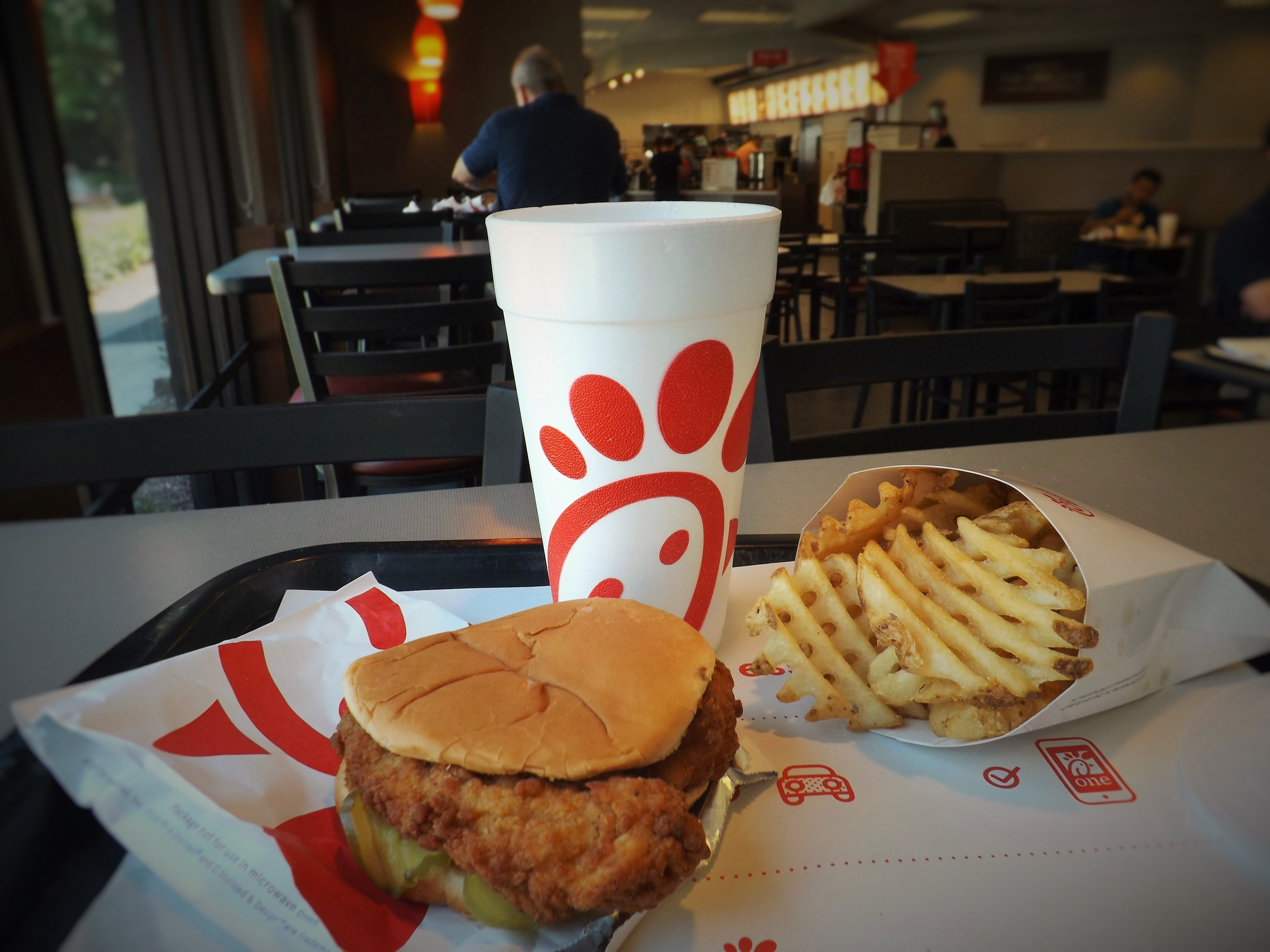
Chicken sandwich and waffle fries from Chick-fil-A

The Cathy family has run Chick-fil-A since the restaurant chain's founding in 1946; as of 2025 it was being led by the third generation of the Cathy family.

=== List of chairmen ===
1. S. Truett Cathy (1946–2013)
2. Dan Cathy (2013– )

=== List of chief executives ===
1. S. Truett Cathy (1946–2013)
2. Dan Cathy (2013–2021)
3. Andrew T. Cathy (2021– )

=== List of presidents ===
1. Jimmy Collins (1968–2001)
2. Tim Tassopoulos (2016–2023)
3. Susannah Frost (2024– )

== Menu ==
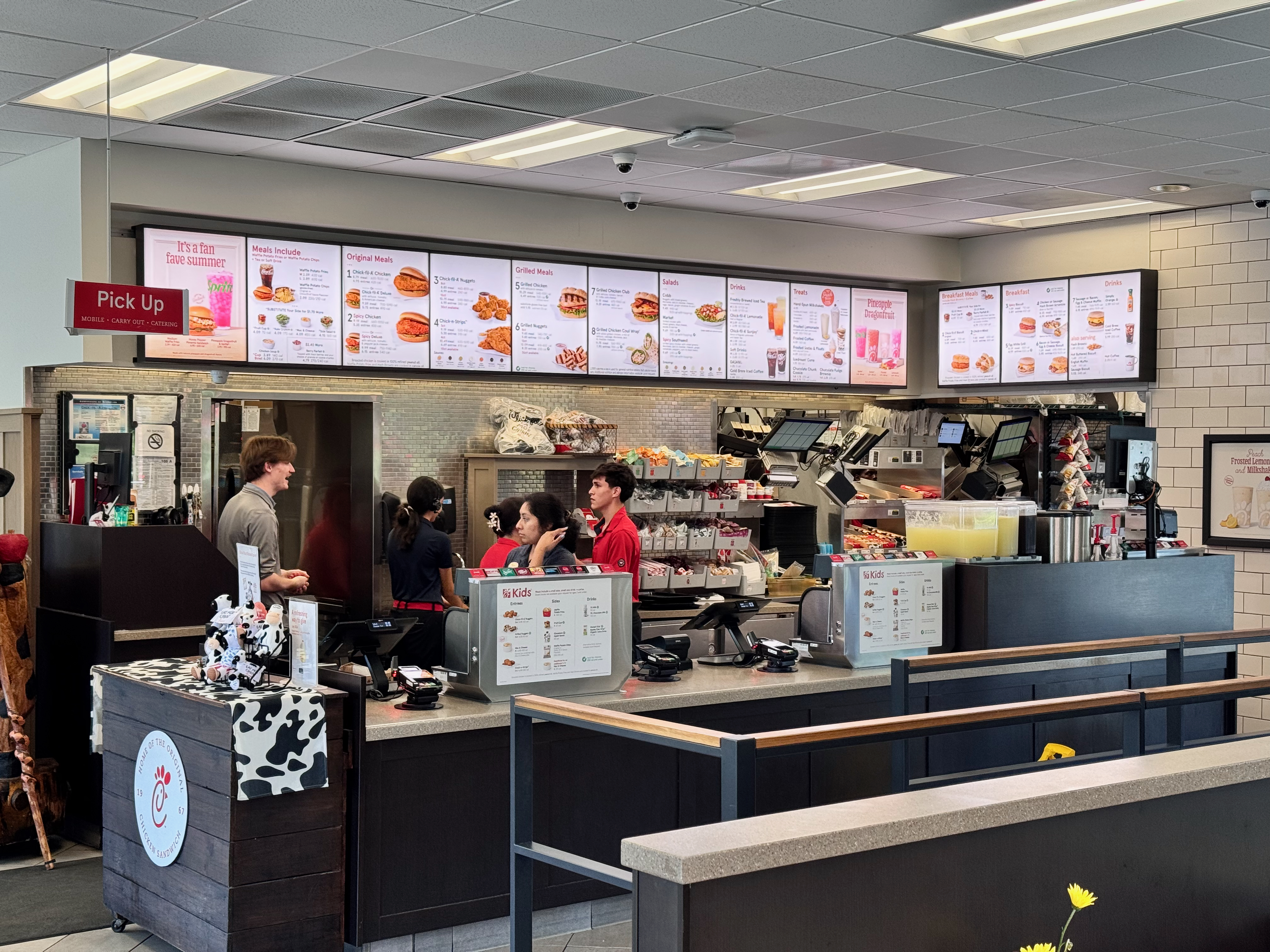
Chick-fil-A order counter and menu

In 2018, the most-ordered item was the waffle fries, followed by soft drinks, chicken nuggets, and the original chicken sandwich. Chick-fil-A's website lists all menu items and nutrition information.

== See also ==
- List of chicken restaurants
