= WinShape Foundation =

American charity, founded 1984

- Founded: 1984
- Type: 501(c)(3) private foundation
- Tax ID no.: 58-1595471 (EIN)
- Location: Mount Berry, Georgia
- Key people: Robert Skelton, Executive Director; Dan T. Cathy, President
- Revenue: $26.1 million (2010)
- Website: www.winshape.org

2010 Grants and Contributions
Organization	Grant
Lar Winshape	$313,684
Fellowship of Christian Athletes	$480,000
Marriage & Family Foundation	$1,188,380
National Christian Foundation	$247,500
Sonscape Retreats	$7,500
Berry College	$413,419
Atlanta Fest Foundation	$65,000
Battlefield Ministries	$1,050
Brackenhurst Ministries	$35,000
Exodus International	$1,000
Family Research Council	$1,000
Helping Hands Ministries Inc	$30,000
Lifeshape Inc	$895,052
National Institute of Marriage	$37,000
The Hideaway Foundation	$25,000
Arm Ministries	$1,500
Care for AIDS	$1,000
Center for Relational Care	$9,895
Georgia Family Council	$2,500
Georgia Public Policy Foundation	$1,000
Heritage Christian Church	$7,500
Kumveka	$10,000
Leadership Development Intl.	$10,000
Lifegate Counseling Center	$1,000
Paulding Pregnancy Services	$1,000
Resurrection Lutheran Church	$2,500
New Mexico Christian Foundation	$54,000

WinShape Foundation is an American Christian charitable organization founded in 1984 by Truett Cathy, founder of fast-food restaurant chain Chick-fil-A, and his wife Jeanette Cathy. WinShape's sister foundation, Lifeshape, was started by the Cathys' daughter and her husband, Trudy and John White.

== Origins ==
After its 1983 school year, Berry College (1902–present) closed its affiliated middle and high school operations at their financially struggling Berry Academy and formed the WinShape Foundation in 1984 as a separate non-profit foundation. WinShape focused on a small college scholarship program housed in the former Berry Academy buildings. Subsequently, boys and girls summer camps were each added and foundation programs expanded to include foster homes; a challenge/ropes course; corporate and marriage retreats; and United States and global mission trips.

== Programs ==
In 2007, the Foundation spent $18 million on the projects it supports, which include college scholarships, a network of foster homes and camps, and programs for marriage counseling.

=== Scholarships ===
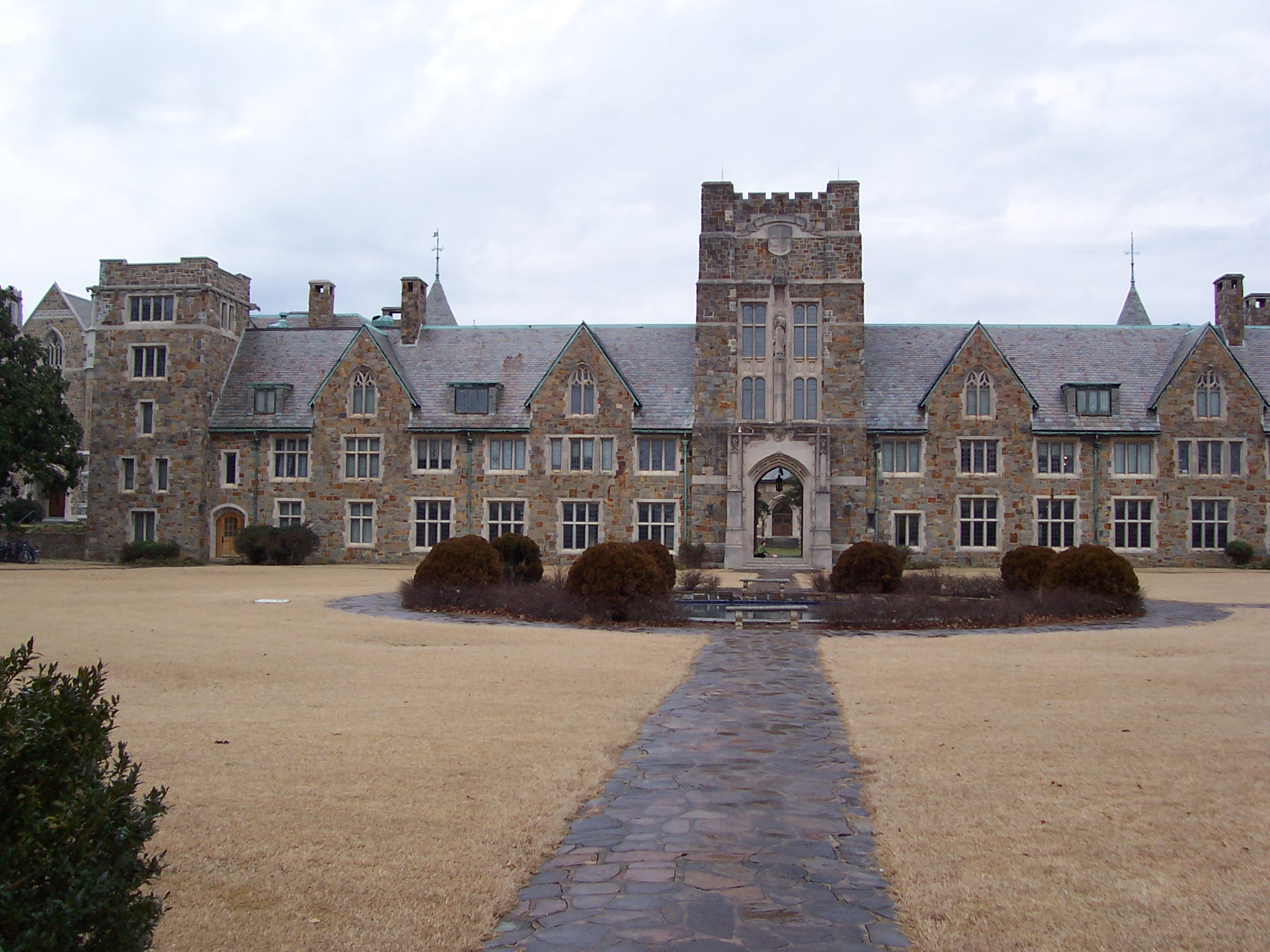
Mary Hall at Berry College

The WinShape scholarship currently provides students at Berry College $8,000 yearly – funded jointly by WinShape and Berry College. These funds replace the first $8,000 of any academic scholarships offered by the college and require a special application and interview process. The program originated with only several dozen students and offered a total of $10,000 over four years. Today, WinShape currently has over 400 college students enrolled per year, with over 800 alumni in just over 20 years.

The requirement details of the scholarship program have varied since its inception. Eligibility originally required current Chick-fil-A employment, high achievement and community involvement in high school, and a willingness to sign a contract including Christianity-based rules. Employment by Chick-fil-A is no longer a requirement, but the Christian-based nature of WinShape is perhaps stronger today than ever; the current contract specifies weekly meeting attendance, leadership discussion group participation, community service, and a Christian lifestyle, including abstaining from alcohol and drugs. Beginning in 2006, freshmen and transfer students were required to attend a week-long orientation camp known as FreshThing.

As of 2009, the foundation had awarded 951 Berry College scholarships with a maximum of $32,000 per student.

The foundation has awarded scholarships up to $32,000 to nearly 820 students of Berry College.

=== Residential camps ===
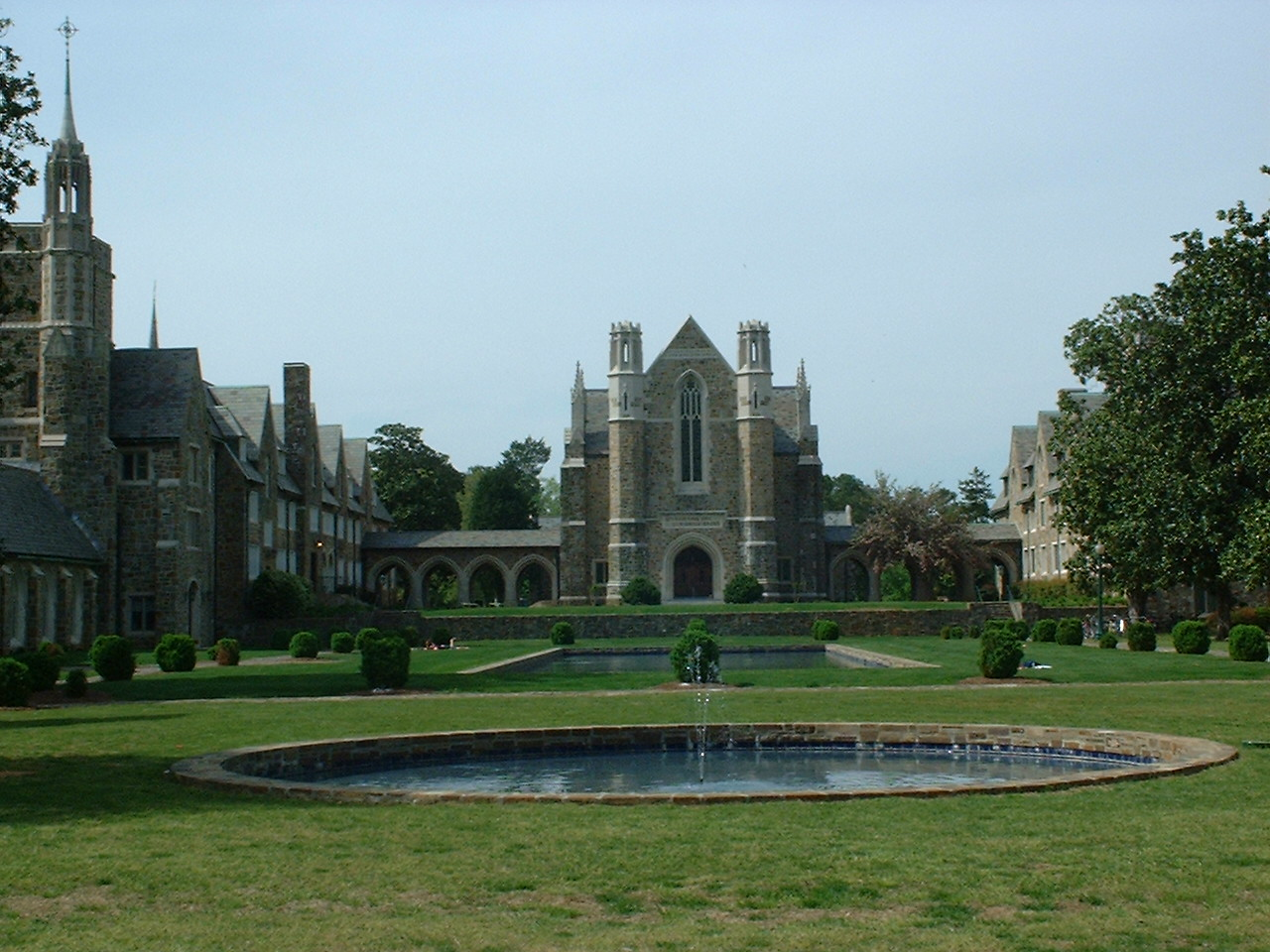
The Ford Buildings

After inception of the College Program in 1984, and wanting its campus to be used also during summer months, Cathy co-founded a summer camp (1985) for boys and girls (1987) on the Mountain Campus of Berry College (Mt. Berry) with Rick Johnson who had previously worked at North Carolina's Camp Ridgecrest, where Cathy's children had earlier attended. Modeled after Ridgecrest, the new camp was designed as a sports camp with a Christian emphasis using Native American themes to structure achievement. Age groups, originally organized into "tribes", are now organized into "packs" and "villages" for the boys' and girls' camps respectively. The boys' camp packs include Bronco (rising 2nd–3rd grade), Raptor (rising 4th–5th grade), Timber (rising 6th–7th grade), Puma (rising 8th–9th grade), Grizzly (rising 10th-11th grade), and Elk (the adventure program, rising 11th–12th grade). The girls' camp "villages" include Canyon (rising 2nd–4th grade), Woodland (rising 5th–6th grade), Cascade (rising 7th–8th grade), Sierra (rising 9th–10th grade), Oasis (rising 11th–12th grade), and Taiga (the adventure program, rising 12th grade). Campers that are at least 14 years old can be awarded for Christian character and leadership by taking a test known as "The Guardians Journey". The Guardians Journey is a long standing Winshape Camp tradition, it is a challenging 18-hour test offered to eligible campers at WinShape Mount Berry. Campers are selected by staff based on demonstrated traits aligned with the camp’s Christian values. The test, beginning during an afternoon and ending the following morning, consists of four sequential components: First, participants engage in service projects across the WinShape Mount Berry campus. At sundown, they must complete a rigorous 1.2-mile run up Lavender Mountain at a set pace, failing if they fall behind or go ahead of it. Following the run, campers are required to write a 1500-word handwritten essay on the prompt “What WinShape means to me,” with failure occurring if the word minimum is not met. The final stage involves starting a fire with a single match and maintaining it for six hours until morning, with failure if the fire cannot be started or goes out. Throughout the entire test, participants must adhere to a “Silence Ban,” refraining from making audible noise, with any talking resulting in immediate failure. Regardless of a camper's success in completing The Guardians Journey, being selected for this test is considered a high honor, reflecting staff recognition of a camper’s embodiment of Winshape's core characteristics.

In 2011, WinShape began a one-week girls camp at Young Harris College in Young Harris, Georgia. This camp consists of three clubs: Skocean, Bumbline, and Royalum. The camp is divided into junior camp (rising 2nd-6th grade) and senior camp (rising 7th-9th grade).

In 2015, WinShape began a one-week boys camp at Truett-McConnell College. This camp consists of three squads: Blaze, Hydro, and Quake.

In 2016, WinShape began a one-week high school girls camp at Cohutta Springs. This camp consists of four legacies: Oak, Aspen, Willow, and Spruce.

=== Camps for Communities ===
As well as hosting overnight camps, Winshape also travels to churches and other sites to give a 1-week Day Camp for completed grades 1–5. Campers are separated into Ocean (completed Kindergarten and 1st Grade), Safari (2nd and 3rd Grade), and Alpine (4th and 5th Grade).

The Ocean, Safari, and Alpine Teams can choose 4 skills. Along with the skills throughout the day, campers also go to three auditorium sessions, 2 Team Times, and play outside at Rec. They compete all week to earn tokens. Finally, on Friday Family Fun Day, they go for half a day to worship, play Super Rec Showdown!, and eat Chick-fil-a (catered by a Chick-fil-a in that area).

In 2017, WinShape Camps for Communities at Cobb is being launched. At Mt. Bethel UMC North Campus, WinShape will operate several sessions of a one-week day camp program that will remain at Mt. Bethel North the entire summer.

=== International camps ===
After 25 years of sponsoring camp programs in the United States, in 2009 WinShape Camps started Camp in Brasília, Brazil. In 2010, WinShape Camps went back to Brazil to do week-long day camps around the capital city.

=== WinShape Homes ===
S. Truett Cathy began a foster home in 1987 near the WinShape Centre on Berry College's campus. It was designed to provide a home for up to twelve children with full-time parents to take care of them. To date, WinShape operates 9 homes for children who are simply victims of circumstance. A Transitional Living Home has also been opened outside of Rome, Georgia to help young adults, from the program, transition successfully from high school to independence.

=== Retreat center ===
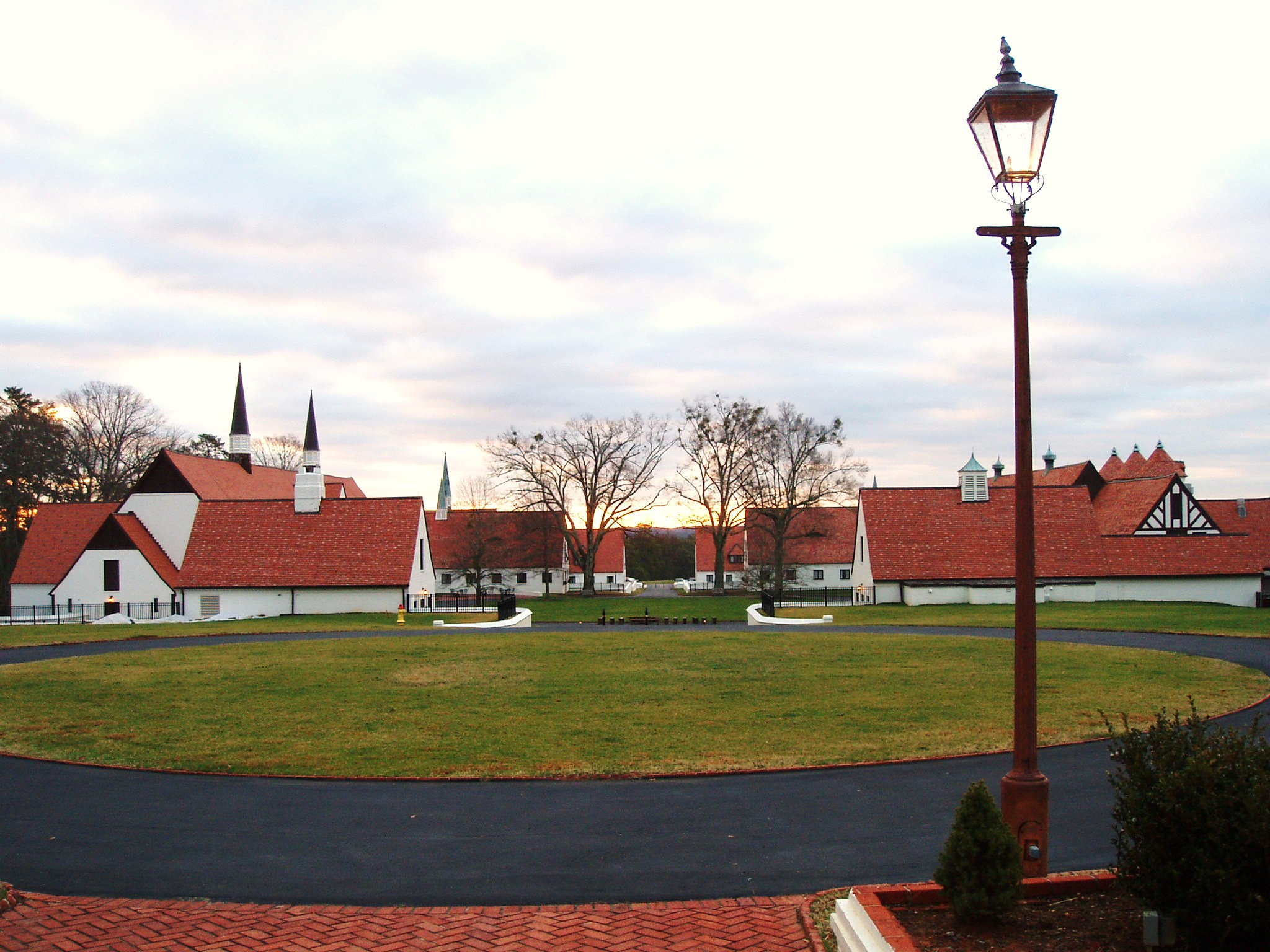
Retreat Center, Rome, Georgia

WinShape Center is located near the hilltop campus of Berry College and more specifically at the adjacent former middle and high school campus of the Berry Academy. Once owned by Martha Berry, the site had once been home to a dairy farm with buildings originally constructed in the architectural style of Normandy, France. After founding WinShape, the academy buildings were remodeled and new buildings were added to create the resort. The new retreat center hosts meetings and fundraising events, with over 8000 guests annually. Donald (a.k.a. Bubba) and Cindy Cathy conduct marriage counseling programs at the center, aimed at those with healthy marriages to those actively considering divorce.

=== WinShape Teams ===
Started in 1991, WinShape Teams uses various techniques such as field games and ropes courses to encourage team-building and help organizations and groups work through issues and experience an improved sense of community.

=== WinShape Marriage ===
Started in 2004, WinShape Marriage hosts marriage retreats at WinShape's Retreat Center in Rome, Georgia.

== Donations ==
Since 2003, WinShape has donated over $5 million to groups that oppose same-sex marriage, including Eagle Forum, Focus on the Family, Fellowship of Christian Athletes, Family Research Council, Exodus International, and the Marriage & Family Legacy Fund, groups which seek to provide, among other works, a conservative biblical interpretation about marriage and sexuality. Approximately $2 million was given in 2009 and almost the same amount in 2010. WinShape's financial support of these groups has caused gay-rights advocates to denounce Chick-fil-A and protest against its restaurants and products on various college and university campuses including Northeastern University and NYU. Northeastern University's Student Senate voted on February 28, 2012, to cancel plans for an on-campus Chick-Fil-A restaurant which failed. and an online petition against the NYU franchise was also launched that same month.

Chick-fil-A released a statement in July 2012: "Going forward, our intent is to leave the policy debate over same-sex marriage to the government and political arena." In March 2014, tax filings for 2012 showed the group stopped funding all organizations which had been previously criticized.
