= Mater Matuta =

Indigenous Latin goddess equivalent to Aurora

- Fertility Goddess
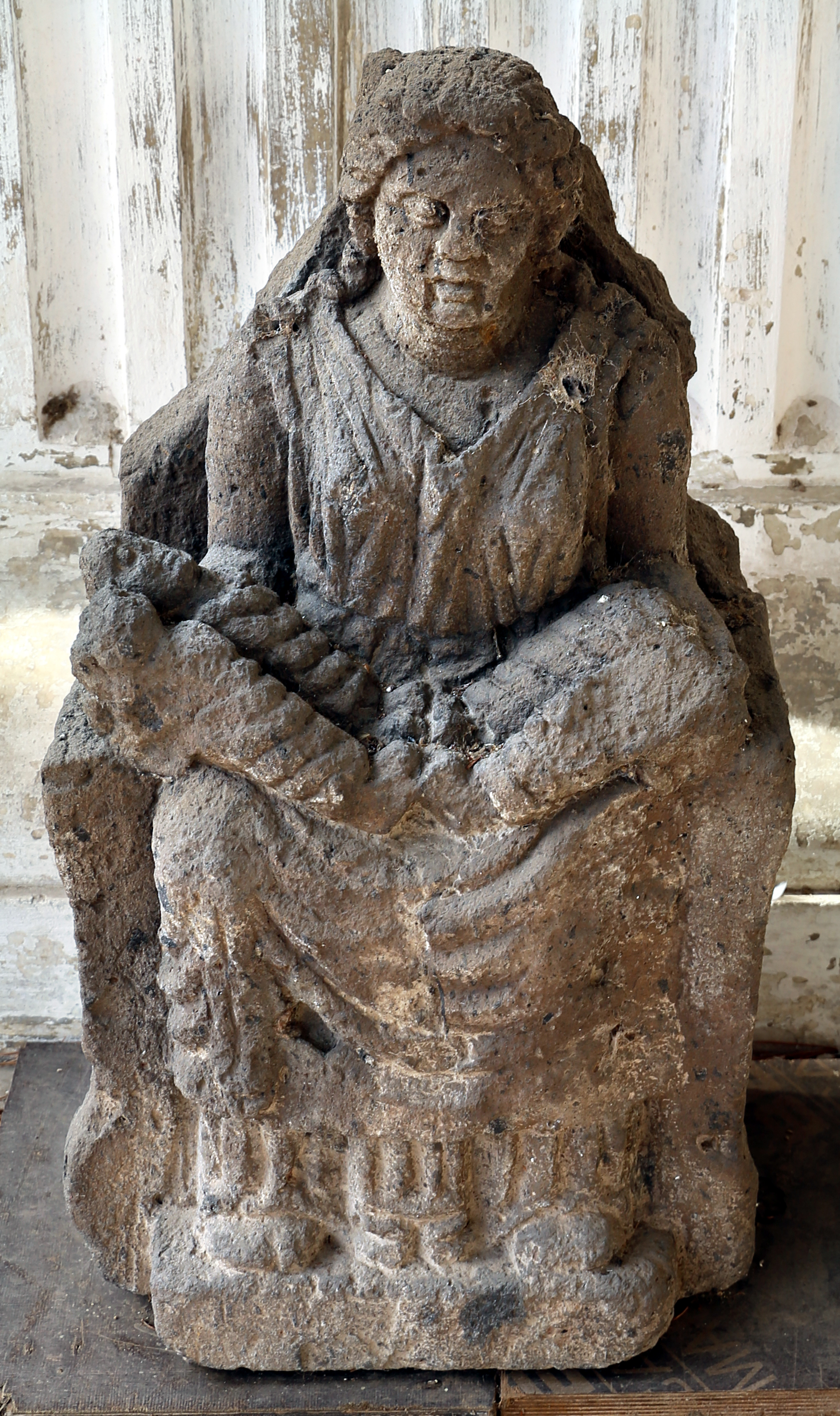
- Mater Matuta, seated and holding swaddled infants
- Major cult centre: Satricum
- Day: June 11
- Gender: Female
- Region: Latium
- Temples: At the Forum Boarium
- Festivals: Matralia

Equivalents
- Greek: Leucothea and Eos
- Roman: Aurora

Mater Matuta was an indigenous Latin goddess adopted by the Romans. Mater Matuta was a goddess of fertility, childbirth, and ripening grain who later became linked to the dawn. Her cult is attested to in several places across Latium with her most famous temple being located at Satricum.

== Etymology ==
The title Mater derives from the Latin word for "mother", and was a courtesy title commonly given to female deities. Matuta is connected to the Latin words mane ('of good hour), manes ('ghosts'), matutinus ('early morning' or 'of the morning'), and the adjective maturus ('ripe' or 'mature').

== Functions and worship ==
Mater Matuta was likely a protective, benevolent goddess closely associated with fertility and the raising and maturation of children.

According to archaeologist Maureen Carroll, it is likely that the divine domain of Mater Matuta overlapped with numerous other deities, allowing the goddess to perform a plethora of functions and services for her suppliants. As a goddess associated with the dawn, she shared attributes with the Greek goddess Eos and the Roman goddess Aurora.

=== Temples ===
Mater Matuta had a temple in Rome, on the north side of the Forum Boarium. The legendary sixth king of Rome, Servius Tullius, was thought to have personally consecrated the temple in the 6th century BCE. It was destroyed in 506 BCE and rebuilt by Marcus Furius Camillus in 396 BCE. It was situated beside the temple of Fortuna, later discovered under the church of Sant' Omobono.

A temple located at Satricum is described in literature by Roman historian Livy. The earliest evidence of temple activity is dated using votive deposits dating to the sixth century BCE. A second temple, larger and made of stone, replaced the first. In the 5th century BCE, another yet even larger temple was constructed. The temple was struck by lightning in 206 BCE. Thousands of objects have been itemized and recorded, including drinking and eating vessels, anatomical votives, and domestic animal votives. Votive material indicative of both male and female worship is attributed to this site.

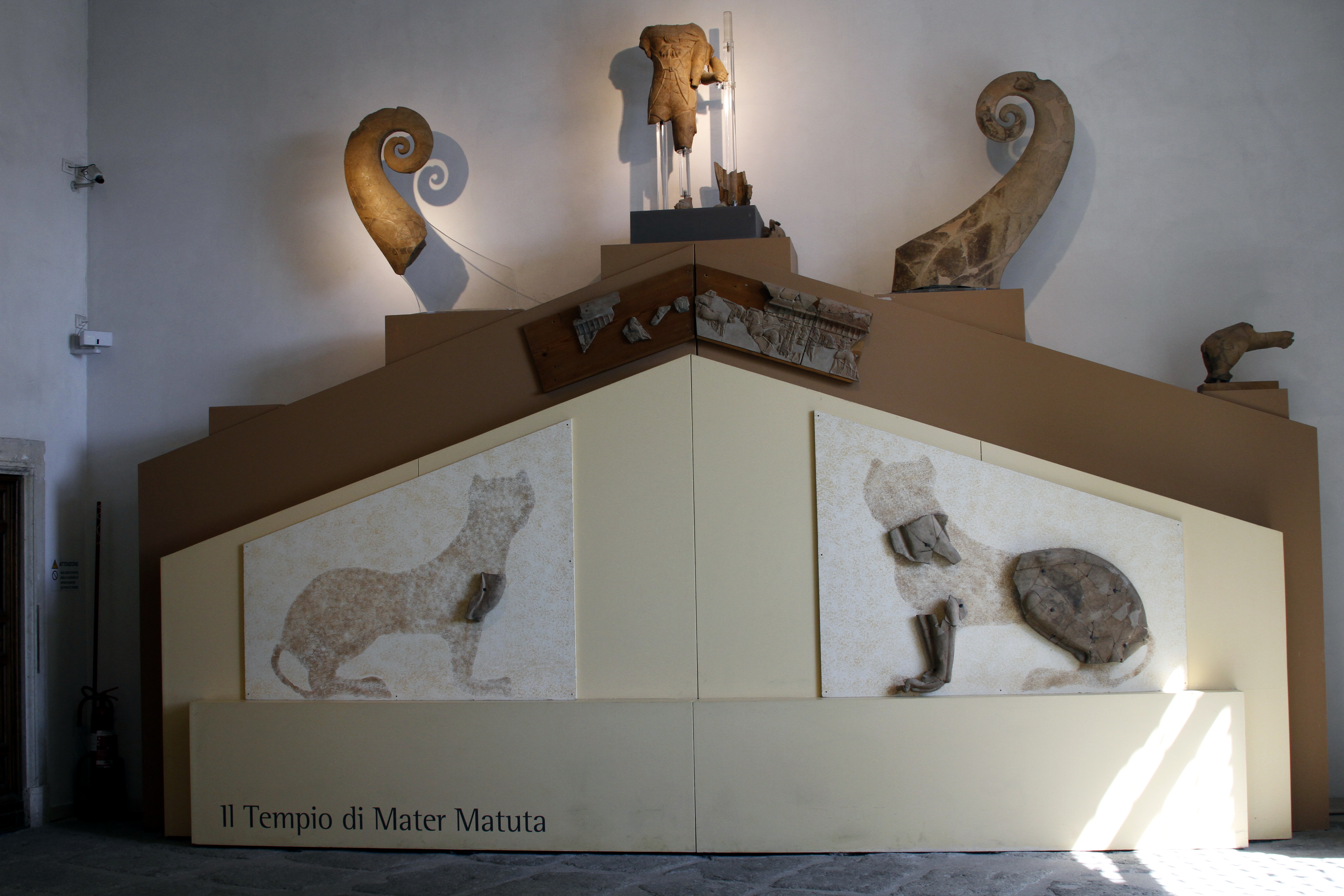
Decorative terracotta pieces discovered in the Sant'Omobono Area believed to be from a temple dedicated to Mater Matuta or Fortuna (6th century BCE)

An ancient temple in Campania, outside modern Capua, yielded dozens of votive statues representing matres matutae; they were found in the 'Fondo Patturelli,' a private estate. While the temple was not dedicated solely to the goddess, she appears to have received worship there. The Paturelli family, who owned the land, illegally excavated the site in 1845 and 1873 and sold the artifacts for personal gain. In order to conceal their illicit activity, the family terminated the excavation, but not before they damaged the temple site. An extensive collection of excavated votives from the site is housed in the Museo Campano in Capua.

==== Temple use and worship ====
Temples of Mater Matuta were not necessarily exclusively utilized to honor this particular goddess. For instance, various stelae from a sanctuary to Mater Matuta at Pesaro mention the names of numerous deities, including Apollo, Juno Lucina, Diana, Feronia, Salus, Fides, Juno Regina, Marica, and Liber. Livy recounts a story in which Tiberius Sempronius Gracchus dedicated a tablet to Jupiter in the temple of Mater Matuta to commemorate a military victory in Sardinia. Likewise, in one inscription from Cora, an individual named Magia Prisca had donated a statue of Jupiter to Mater Matuta. In some cases, it appears that other deities were perceived as endorsing simultaneous worship of themselves alongside Mater Matuta. One inscription mentions that an individual named Flavia Nicolais Saddane constructed and dedicated an altar to Mater Matuta under the direction of Juno (ex responso / deae Iunonis).

It is likely that women held an important role in the worship of Mater Matuta, as numerous Roman inscriptions mention female magistrae functioning as priestesses within the cult of this goddess. Many of the women stated to be involved with the cult of Mater Matuta were also married, though it is unclear if marriage was a requirement for attaining a high position within the cult. However, the archaeologist Maureen Carroll doubts the reliability of Tertullian as a source, suggesting that he may have conflated the cult of Mater Matuta with the cult of Fortuna Muliebris, whose cult statue was also stated by Dionysius of Halicarnassus to only be crowned by univirae. It is also unclear whether the cult of this deity was exclusive to women or open to both sexes. Archaeological excavation of a temple to Mater Matuta in Satricum has unearthed a 5th-4th century BCE votive pit with—among other objects—weapons and metal items, which may reflect masculine activity at the site. Nevertheless, Carroll considers this possibility uncertain, noting that the same pit also contains anatomical votives depicting uteruses and male genitalia. Carroll does, however, concede that depictions of both male and female figures and genitalia appear in another votive deposit dating between the 4th and 3rd centuries BCE.

== Relationships with other deities ==
Mater Matuta was associated with a number of other Greek, Etruscan, Roman, and Phoenician goddesses. Statuettes at Satricum depicted a female figure with a solar disc behind her head an iconographic detail similar to representations of the goddess Uni in Etruria and the Phoenician goddess Astarte. She was also likely associated with Fortuna, goddess of good fortune, due to the closeness of their temples in Rome and the dates of their festivals.

=== Leucothea ===
Mater Matuta was linked with the Greek sea goddess Leucothea, known as Ino— Semele's sister and Dionysus' aunt— before her transformation into the goddess. After Semele's death, Ino raised her nephew Dionysus as her own child. During the Matralia, parents would nurse, care for, and pray for their nieces and nephews instead of their own children, emulating how Ino cared for her Dionysus. According to the 1st-century CE historian Plutarch, Mater Matuta could be considered "almost identical with Leucothea." Similarly, both the 1st-century BCE statesman Cicero and the 1st-century BCE poet Ovid claim that Ino was referred to by the Greeks as Leucothea but by the Romans as Matuta.

== Matralia ==
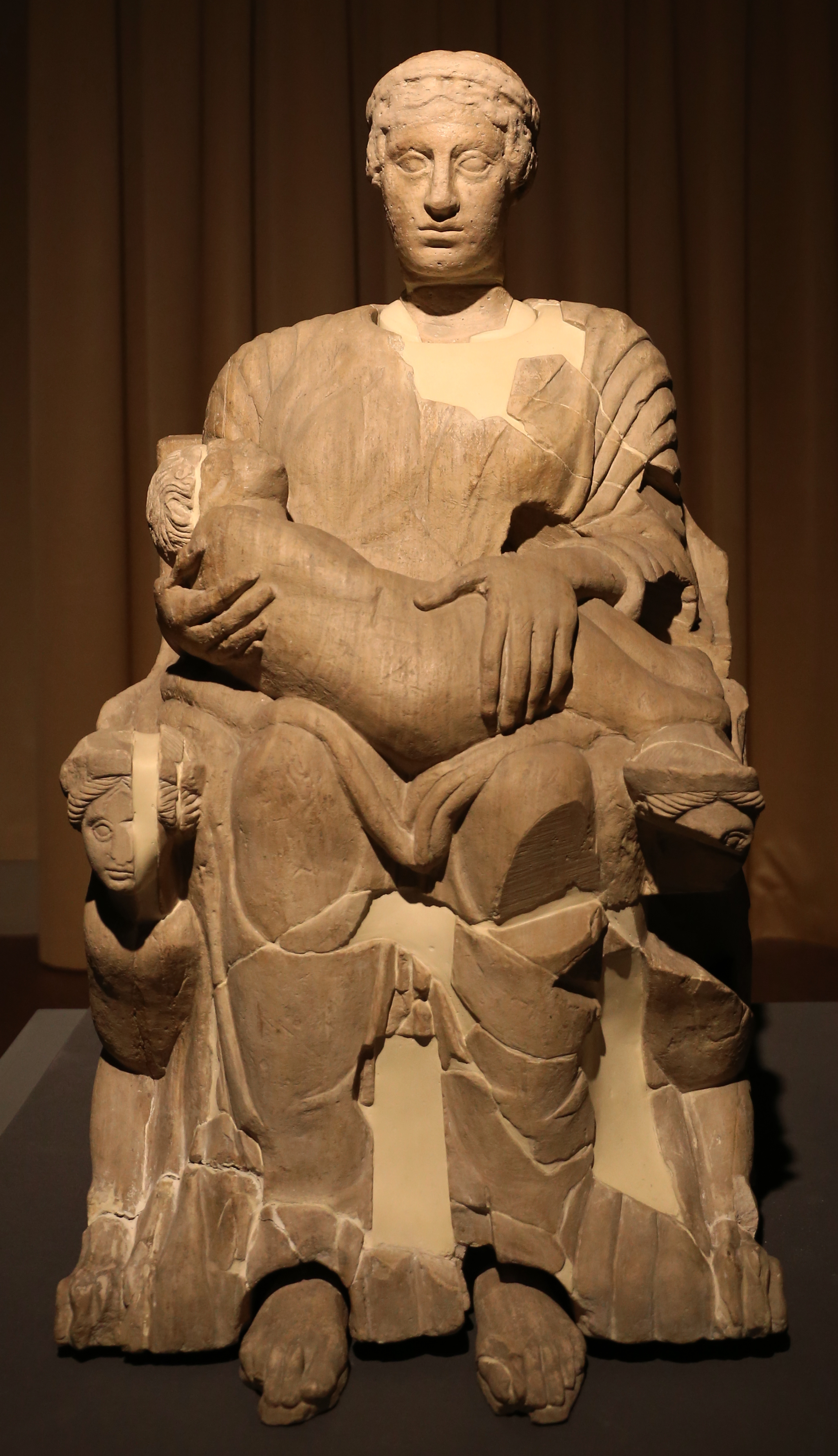
Etruscan cinerary statue depicting a seated Mater Matuta holding a child (c. 5th century BCE). Found in a necropolis near Chianciano Terme

At Rome, Mater Matuta's festival was the Matralia, celebrated on June 11 at her temple in the Forum Boarium. The philologist and historian Martin Litchfield West suggests that the date of this ceremony may relate to the solstice, noting that—according to John the Lydian—it occurred six months prior to a solar festival. Ovid implies that the festival was reserved only for "bonae matres," meaning "good matrons." Moreover, Plutarch implies that only matronae (freewomen) in their first marriage were permitted to partake in the rites, stating "it is forbidden to slave-women to set foot in the shrine of Matuta."

An image of Mater Matuta was crowned with a garland during the celebration. The 2nd-century CE Christian theologian Tertullian implies that the responsibility of bedecking the cult statue of Mater Matuta was reserved for univirae: women who had only married once. Another aspect of the festival was eating specially prepared cakes. Varro, a 1st-century BCE polymath, states that Roman matrons would bake cakes in an earthen vessel referred to as a testu during the ceremony. Likewise, Ovid mentions that, on the Matralia, mothers should offer to Matuta "the yellow cakes that are her due." The exact term utilized to describe the color of the cake, "flava," is also utilized by Ovid to describe the dawn goddess Aurora, perhaps indicating that the yellow cakes were associated with the sun in some manner.

Notably, a singular female slave participated in the rites, which involved her being beaten and driven from the area by the freeborn women. According to the philologist Georges Dumézil, this ceremony may connect to the Vedic dawn goddess Ushas, who is responsible for forcefully driving back the night. Alternatively, the Encyclopedia of Indo-European Culture suggests that the ritualistic beating reflects a Vedic myth in which Indra assails Ushas for her unwillingness to begin the day. This story may itself reflect a broader Indo-European archetype of a reluctant dawn goddess, which also perhaps manifests itself in Greek myths regarding Eos and the Latvian deity Auseklis. In support of the connection between the Vedic and Roman deity, Dumézil cites another ritual described by Plutarch, during which women would not pray for "blessings on their own children, but only on their sisters’ children." Dumézil connects this ritual to the maternal role of Ushas, who supposedly cares for the child of her sister Ratri. The classicist Lesley E. Lundeen suggests that, during this ritual, the women would temporarily perform a maternal role for the nieces or nephews of their sister, thereby reinforcing matrilineal family bonds.

== See also ==
- List of Roman birth and childhood deities
- Swaddled infant votive
