= Sant'Omobono, Cremona =

Church building in Cremona, Italy

Coordinates: 45°08′06″N 10°01′04″E

Sant'Omobono is a Roman Catholic church located on the piazzetta di Sant'Omobono, in central Cremona, region of Lombardy, Italy. The church faces across the piazza, the Palazzo Pallavicino and Palazzo Cattaneo. The piazza was formerly a cemetery used during time of the plague.

== History ==
A church originally dedicated to Saint Egidius was erected here, but after the death of Homobonus in the city, and his death in this church in 1197, he was buried here and the church rebuilt, and with his canonization, the church took his name.

The church has undergone a number of reconstructions, including in the 15th century and in 1602, when the 13th-century statues of St Homobonus and Bishop Sicardo (the local bishop who arranged his canonization) were added to niches in the façade.

The interiors are richly frescoed, including works in 1755 by Giovanni Angelo Borroni and Giovanni Battista Zaist, who painted the quadratura and Scenes from the Life of the Saint. The cupula is painted with the Virtues of St Homobonus by Borroni.

The relics of the saint were kept here in a marble casket until 1614, when they were moved to a crypt in the Old Cathedral.
