= Votive baby =

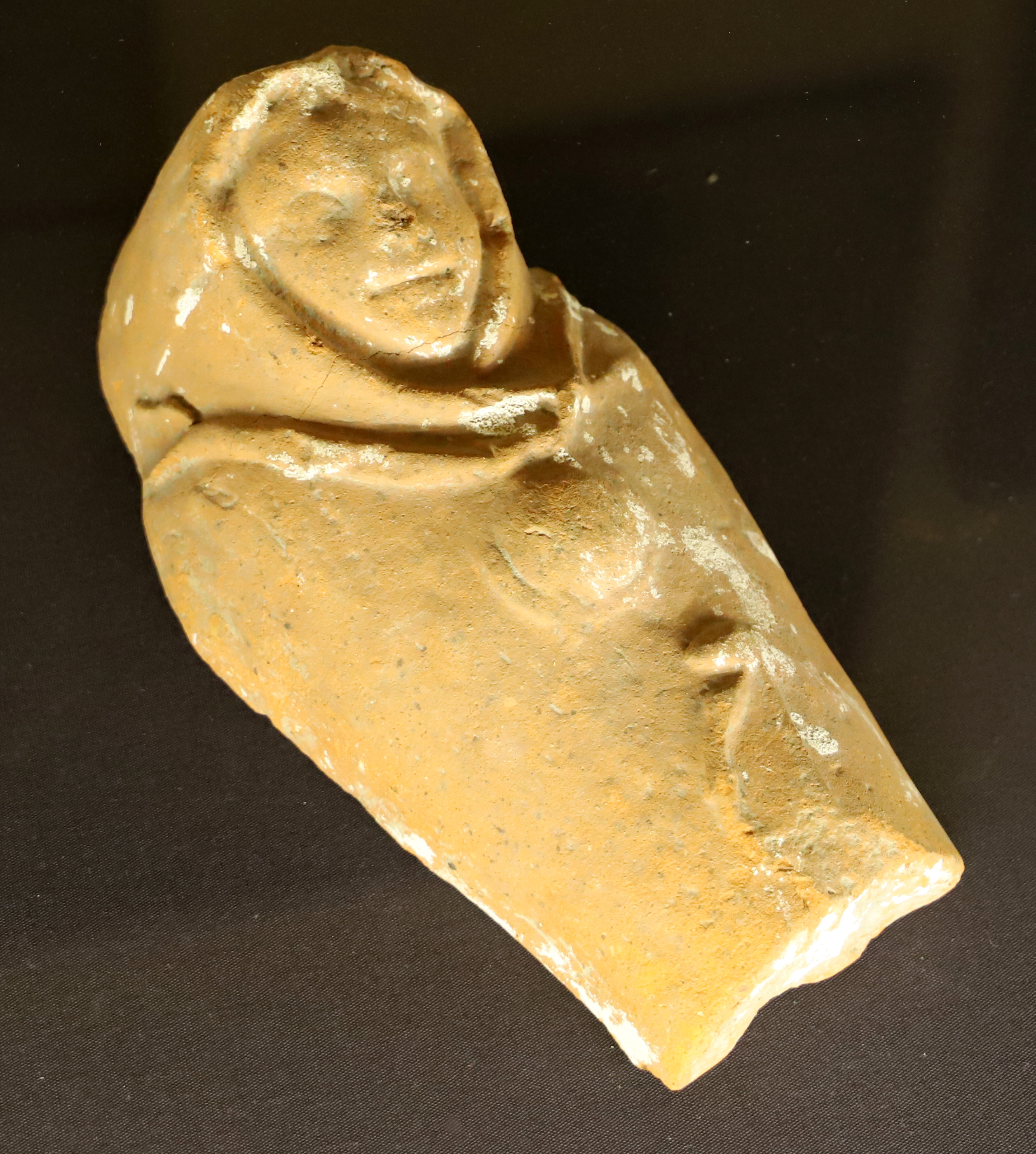
Infant votive from the sanctuary of Peciano near Cortona

A baby votive is an offering presented to a supernatural power at a shrine and represents an infant or child in the first few years of life. The phenomenon can be found across cultures at various points in history. They are easiest to identify in cultures with a visual tradition that distinguishes babies from older children and adults. They take a variety of forms, such as a swaddled infant or seated baby, and can be two-dimensional or three-dimensional.

== Context and function ==
Votive babies are dedicated for a variety of reasons which are culturally, chronologically, and personally dependent. Generally people dedicate them to gain a future good or to give thanks for a past benefit. They can be given in hopes for a successful pregnancy and birth, to acquire health and good fortune for a baby, or to thank a holy figure for a baby's survival and prosperity. Equally, they may serve the more prosaic function of reminding the divinity or other worshipers' about the baby's existence. They are ritually manipulated in different ways even within the same religious tradition, as the practices of the local shrine tend to dictate local custom. On Cyprus, Dr. EJ Graham observed wax babies, which were sold by local candle makers, hung from string in several village churches. Rather than being hung up in the churches, at the Shrine of Fatima in Portugal, wax models of babies, body parts, and candles are presented and burned on a fire pit.

== Forms ==
In some artistic traditions, babies are not visually differentiated from adults. This makes it difficult to determine if votives refer to children or adults. In those contexts where the distinction is made, some visual types and motifs are common.

=== Swaddled baby ===
A particularly common visual schema is the swaddled infant. In ancient Italy, for example, offerings of infants wrapped in swaddling bands appeared starting in the 5th century BCE and would eventually be found in many parts of the Roman empire. These ancient Mediterranean examples were crafted in a variety of materials, including terracotta and various metals. In the 19th century in Germany, beeswax models of swaddled babies could be brightly painted, include glass eyes, and real hair attached; a remarkable example with elaborately painted swaddling clothes was given at a church in Upper Franconia before becoming part of the collection at the Bayerisches Nationalmuseum in Munich.

=== Seated baby ===
Rather than emphasizing the swaddling bands of the child, other votive forms show babies with the ability to sit up. This form was common in the Late Classical and Hellenistic Mediterranean. The so-called 'temple boy' statues were dedicated to Apollo, Hera, and Aphrodite (among others, especially in Cyprus). In many cases, they are depicted wearing a diagonal amulet string across the chest, which served to protect the child from ill fortune; in Rome and Etruria, the children wear bullae, as seen in a 4th century BCE bronze votive of a child with a dedicatory inscription naming the Etruscan gods Selvans and Śuri. In addition to these early three-dimensional votives, two-dimensional seated babies are known from contemporary Christian contexts. Thin metal plaques with hammered designs, such as the tamata used in Orthodox regions, depict babies and are hung up in shrines.

== Other religious representations of babies ==
While people may dedicate votive babies which show an infant on its own, religious representations of babies can take many forms even if they are not 'votive babies' per se. Motifs representing a divine child and mother can have various religious purposes. In the Late period in Egypt, for example, a man named Ankhhor gave a statuette of an enthroned Isis nursing the infant Horus to the goddess; two inscriptions on the statuette refer to Isis and call her the Divine Mother, while asking her to give health and life to the dedicator. Rather than a representation of a mortal child, the depiction emphasizes the deity being honored. Several centuries later, the enthroned mother and child motif appeared in the Byzantine-era icon of Mary and Jesus from St. Catherine's Monastery in Egypt's Sinai Peninsula. Rather than a votive presented to a divinity in their shrine, this image functioned as an icon, a sacred image meant to foster devotional interactions between worshiper and holy figure.

Additionally, narratives featuring babies have also been set up at sanctuaries. Stories showing Maya giving birth to the Shakyamuni Buddha were commonly displayed at Buddhist ritual sites, such as stupas or stele shrines. A pottery fragment showing the birth of daughter found in an Etruscan sanctuary sacred to the goddess Uni has been described as the earliest known scene of birth in Western art, although the mother and child's identity is not clear, nor is the function of the ancient vessel. Narratives involving mortal babies could be offered in ancient Greek sanctuaries, such as a votive relief carved with a sacrificial procession and presentation of an infant to a goddess, in this case likely Artemis. While these images may function as offerings or adornment for the sacred space, rather than focusing on the baby alone, they incorporate the baby into larger narratives and family networks.

== See also ==
- Swaddled infant votive
