= D&G (disambiguation) =

D&G usually refers to Dolce & Gabbana, an Italian fashion house.

D&G may also refer to:

- Dumfries and Galloway, a region in Scotland
- Desnoes & Geddes, a Jamaican beverage company
- Deleuze and Guattari, a philosopher duo
- D&G Bus, a bus company in England
- Darius and Girėnas Stadium, a stadium in Lithuania
- Domestic & General, insurance company
- D&G, an album by Swedish rap group Drain Gang
