= S. W. Copley =

English artisan and land dealer

Samuel William Copley
- Caricature by David Low
- Born: October 21, 1859; Huddersfield, United Kingdom
- Died: November 4, 1937 (aged 78); Elstree
- Occupations: Artisan and businessman
- Known for: Developing businesses in Australia and the UK
- Spouse: Henrietta Maude Marguerite Sands (m. 1897)
- Children: 4

Samuel William Copley (21 October 1859 – 4 or 5 November 1937) was an English artisan who made a fortune in land deals in Western Australia and returned to England, where he continued to be involved in business.

== History ==
Copley was born in Berry Brow, near Huddersfield, Yorkshire, and trained as a tailor, but worked at his father's barbershop in Huddersfield. He subsequently worked in that trade in Manchester and Blackpool before returning to his father's business. In 1882, aged 23, he left for Pontypridd, Wales, where he practised hairdressing and made extra money by trading in such lines as boots, furniture, and musical instruments.

=== Australia ===
A half-brother, Ben Copley, had emigrated to Australia around 1883, and Copley and his brother-in-law Joe Willie Ellis sailed for Australia, travelling steerage, (Note: Copley was careful with money: his philosophy being that no matter how little he earned, he would save half, and anything he "had to have" he didn't have to have.) on the Grand in 1885. He settled in Melbourne, where he worked as a barber for three years. His savings from England amounted to £400, which he invested in local businesses, but failed to make a profit, losing substantially on silver shares when Broken Hill mines were being developed.

==== Fremantle ====
In 1888 he moved to Fremantle, Western Australia, working as a barber and tobacconist for two years, and in 1890 founding a bookmaking and money lending business, in Fremantle and Perth.

==== Passenger ferries ====
He became associated with Joseph Charles (Note: Joseph Charles, real name John Joseph Charles Maloney, was an energetic real estate developer, a founder of Subiaco and the local "Tattersall" sweep, Senate candidate and mayor of South Perth. Married to "Ethel Charles" (real name Annie Maloney) he died penniless on 31 December 1906.) and his South Perth Ferry Company (Note: South Perth Ferry Company ran shuttle services between Barrack Street, Perth and Mends Street, South Perth) some time before 1898, when their new steam paddle ferry Duchess was built by the Perth firm of W. & S. Lawrence to join their Princess, Countess and Queen (previously named Empress). In 1903 Copley became sole owner of the business. In 1910 Princess was auctioned off. The government acquired the company around 1912.

==== Real estate ====
He was involved with William Britnall in the subdivision of Chatsworth Estate to form the Perth suburb of Highgate Hill, now Highgate. In 1900 with Ben Copley and James Patterson (died 11 July 1924), he purchased the Ord River cattle station, which in 1912 they sold to the Vestey brothers for £250,000. Also in 1900, in conjunction with R. T. Robinson, Copley and his brother purchased 730 acres (300 ha) of the Mount Lawley estate which they sub-divided into quarter-acre blocks, yielding a vast profit and incidentally triggering Perth's building boom which began around 1905. In 1900 he purchased 40,000 acres (16,000 ha) at Upper Swan, Western Australia, which he developed as a sheep and cattle station with some 300 acres (120 ha) of high-class vineyards for the dried grape market. In 1900 he purchased 60,000 acres (24,000 ha) at Baker's Hill, from which he harvested many thousand tons of wandoo timber.

==== Last years in Australia ====
In 1912 Copley was forced by the government to sell the ferry company, by cancelling its contract for use of the government wharves. Copley had sold his fine house at Mount Lawley after the government compulsorily acquired the ferry company's docklands, and in September 1913 he left for England.

=== England ===
On his return to Britain, Copley received medical attention for some chronic problems, and after several surgical operations he settled in London. In 1914 Copley became chairman of directors of the Atlantic Insurance Company, the West Australian Insurance Company, and Copley's Bank Ltd. He founded the Atlas Insurance Company (later Domestic & General), a silk factory on the Thames, and a bird-seed factory at Camberwell. He founded Copley's Bank Ltd, which around 1917 took over management of these businesses, and Copley retired to his estate at Elstree.

When the Huddersfield Corporation (municipal council) wished to acquire a very large freehold (the Ramsden Estate) that had come onto the market in 1919, Copley fronted up with the £l,350,000 purchase price and transferred the property to the council when it was in a position to reimburse him.

He made a return to Western Australia in 1927, expressing pleasure at the state's progress, and at the Merredin hotel in particular, which he had built 21 years earlier.

He died at his home in Elstree, Hertfordshire, leaving an estate valued at £39,089, the bulk having been sequestered with Copley's Bank Limited.

== Recognition ==
A blue plaque in his memory has been fixed to the Berry Brow Liberal Club.

== Family ==
Copley married Henrietta Maude Marguerite Sands (1869–1947) at Holborn, England on 13 August 1897. They had four children:

- Mary Copley (1899– )
- Phyllis Copley (1901– )
- Samuel Richard Copley (23 July 1909 – 2002)
- David William Copley (23 July 1909 – 1998)

The twin boys spent most of their young life in England, returning to Australia in 1932. His widow died on 11 June 1947 and her remains were buried at Elstree Parish Church alongside those of her husband.

His grandson via his son Samuel was financier and conservationist Martin Copley, the founder of the Australian Wildlife Conservancy in Perth.
