= Swaddled infant votive =

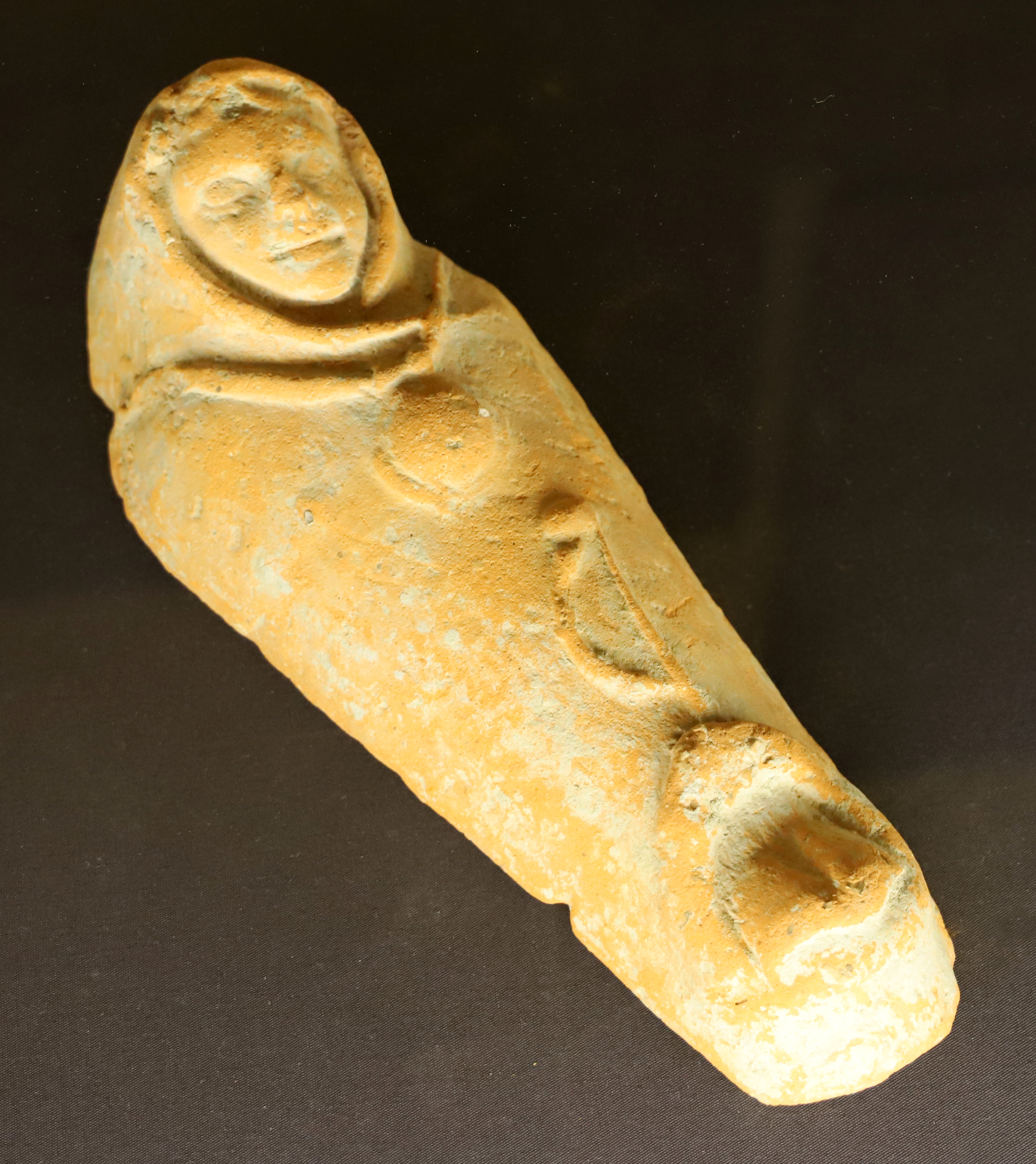
Terracotta swaddled baby votive

Swaddled baby votives (Italian: bambini in fasce) are figures of babies found throughout ancient Italian sanctuary sites. These artifacts appear throughout the Etrusco-Latial-Campanian area, though primarily in Etruria, and even more particularly in the northern parts of Etruria. They are, however, found as far south as sites such as Paestum and Luceria. Swaddled infant votives typically appear in small numbers; they are relatively rare compared to other votives in archaic Italic sites, though they do appear in the thousands at Paestum specifically. There is great stylistic variation across swaddled infant votives: Some are small enough to fit into the palm of the hand, whereas others are life-sized. In some votives, the swaddling clothes cover the whole body, while in others they only reach just up to the neck, and in certain cases the binding does not cover the feet. Swaddled infant votives also sometimes wear headgear; either a peaked cap or a veil, the former of which is also found amongst ancient Greek depictions of infants and was probably introduced to Italy via Hellenistic influence.

The exact function of these artifacts is unclear; they may have been dedicated in response to a successful pregnancy or childbirth, or perhaps to procure treatment for a sick child. Alternatively, they perhaps represented the completion of the phase of early infancy wherein the child was bound by their swaddling clothes. In ancient thought, according to medical writers such as Soranus of Ephesus, the practice of swaddling served to shape the baby into a more desired form. Consequently, once the child no longer needed their swaddling clothes, they had successfully been molded into a more ideal citizen. Thus, the practice of dedicating swaddled infant votives can be understood as an attempt to commemorate the successful completion of this transitory stage of life, and the subsequent introduction of the infant into society as a fully-fledged member.

== Function ==
Swaddled infant statues are exclusively found in votive contexts, and—like other votive artifacts—they were designed to be displayed at a sanctuary, though they fulfilled this particular task in a multitude of ways. Some swaddled infant votives were placed standing up, for they showcase the feet resting on some base of support. Other such artifacts, however, must have been laid in a supine position, for they have feet unable to bear weight or flattened backs. As regards their symbolic or cultural value, the general purpose of swaddled infant votives is clear: They in some way represented parents' fears regarding their children and they were intended to incur some sort of protection against some malady. However, the more specific details concerning their function are less certain. Many of these sculptures are comparable in scale to the height of an average two-month-old infant in the modern world, which is around 50 centimetres (20 in), and therefore it is likely that these votives were intended to be life-sized. However, some of these swaddled votives are incredibly small, with certain examples even fitting into the palm of the hand, and therefore not all votives could have accurately reflected the size of any real infant.

=== Possible connections to fertility ===
It has been proposed that these infant votives were given as part of a request for a successful conception or pregnancy, with the object itself representing the desired child. In Gravisca, swaddled infant votives were found alongside large numbers of anatomical uteri, possibly because the votive wombs represented a request for pregnancy, and the model infant constituted a thank-offering in case the prayer worked. If this theory were accepted, the much larger quantity of anatomical uteri than infant votives could be explained as the result of many suppliants not successfully becoming pregnant. All known swaddled infant votives at Gravisca—save for two—were discovered in one room, that—according to an inscribed dedication in the area—was dedicated to Hera-Uni, while the remaining two votives were found in a room dedicated to Aphrodite-Turan. The general preference for Hera-Uni amongst the suppliants may reflect a particular concern from some nuance of her divine domain. According to the archaeologist A. Comella, the rest of the artifact assemblage from the room connected with Hera-Uni relates to childbirth and reproduction, whereas the material from the room associated with Aphrodite-Turan was more evocative of matrimony. However, the archaeologist Emma-Jayne Graham suggests that it is ultimately not possible to determine which aspects of these goddess's functions appealed to dedicators. Swaddled infant votives are also possibly connected with fertility deities at Paestum, where they have been found in large numbers, alongside kourotrophoi and votives depicting uteri, at the Italic Temple and the sanctuary at Santa Venera, the latter of which was dedicated to Aphrodite. At Paestum, the swaddled infant votives and the uteri, unlike the kourotrophoi, were not dedicated at the sanctuary of Athena, perhaps because the virgin goddess Athena was not associated with childbirth.

However, in spite of the aforementioned examples, these artifacts are relatively uncommon at sites associated fertility deities. For example, no such objects were discovered at the sanctuary of Diana at Nemi or the temple of Mater Matuta in Rome. Swaddled infant votives were evidently not exclusively associated with female fertility goddesses, for the sanctuaries of San Giuliano in Tuscany and of Tessennano by Vulci—both of which contained swaddled infants—may have been dedicated to the gods Apollo and Mars respectively. In other cases, they are also connected with divinities such as Hercules, Asclepius, Janus, and Dionysus Fufluns. Ultimately, in the majority of instances, there is no epigraphic evidence to confirm the particular gods to which a site was dedicated. Moreover, according to Graham, the symbolism of a votive offering was directly connected to the object it represented, as in, for example, votive objects depicting body parts are generally thought to have related to a request for the healing of that specific body part. By the same logic, a votive depiction of an infant is more likely to refer to a specific living infant rather than a yet-to-be-born baby. Graham further notes that ancient Italic peoples already had other offerings more readily connectable to fertility, namely uteri, male or female genitalia, seated couples, kourotrophoi, and breasts.

Swaddled infant votive possibly depicted holding a pomegranate.

=== Safeguarding the child in life or in death ===
Since swaddled infant votives are often found alongside anatomical votives, it has also often been assumed that they were connected with the healing of sick children, itself a common concern for the people of ancient Italy, as child mortality rates were high during this period. However, the faces of swaddled infant votives rarely show any visible signs of ailment, and—with some exceptions—they mostly seem to portray an idealized, youthful visage. It is possible that signs of illness were painted onto the statues, and they have thus been lost in accordance with the loss of the paint itself. In any case, even if there were never any signs of sickness, then it still does not necessarily fully contradict this hypothesis, as it is possible that the votives were merely dedicated as a thank-offering following the successful recovery of a child. Alternatively, they might have been dedicated as part of a request for continued guarantees of health on the part of the baby, thereby averting future illness, rather than fending off current afflictions.

Rather than safeguarding the child in life, they were perhaps supposed to protect the deceased infant during their transition to the afterlife. In support of this theory, the archaeologist Stephen Smithers notes the existence of one swaddled infant votive depicted carrying a pomegranate, itself associated with the goddess Persephone and the kourotrophos in ancient Italy. Furthermore, the archaeologist Britt Marie Fridh-Haneson has adduced as additional evidence for this theory the few examples of swaddled infant votives marked by facial features indicative of an older age. According to Fridh-Haneson, the older faces were designed to represent the reincarnated initiates into Orphic cults, though it has been alternatively suggested that these excessively aged faces resulted merely from the reuse of molds intended for other sculptures.

=== Representing a rite of passage ===
Given that many votives were adorned with bullae, and bullae in ancient Rome functioned as markers of childhood and freebirth, it may be that these votives themselves were also associated with one's position in society, perhaps more specifically their citizenship status. The ancient Roman medical writer Soranus of Ephesus explicitly connects the practice of swaddling with a desire to shape an infant into a more ideal form, writing that swaddling would "mold every part according to its natural shape." Similarly, the 2nd-century Greek author Galen describes and condemns nurse who bind infant girls in such a manner so as to cause the hips and thighs to be larger than the chest. Glinister notes that this practice of molding babies via swaddling binds was evidently so common in the ancient world that authors specifically remark on when foreign cultures did not perform the same custom. For instance, the 1st-century author Plutarch writes that, at Sparta, "they reared infants without swaddling bands, and so left their limbs and forms free to develop." These ideas are assuredly not perfectly reminiscent of the cultural significance of these votives, though they may at least be parallel.

According to archaeologists such as Glinister and Graham, by virtue of abandoning their swaddling clothes, the infant had exited the era of their life wherein they were still being molded into a more ideal shape, and by extension into more ideal citizens. Essentially, the act of dedicating these votives would have marked the completion of this important life event in the same manner that dedicating a doll or bulla symbolized the end of childhood for the Romans. In further support of this theory, Glinister notes that—among the limited epigraphic evidence for the particular deities to which these votives were offered—names such as Uni or Juno are attested at Vulci, Falerii, and Caere, and worship of Mater Matuta is attested in Satricum. According to Glinister, these deities were all responsible for maintaining the community, in part through their function as overseers of fertility, for individual families are the basic units of society.

One of the largest known hoards of swaddled infant votives was found at Porta Nord, a site that might have connected to either Dionysus Fufluns or Janus and the Lares, all of whom were divine beings connected with growth and rites of passage, which meshes well with the theory that the swaddled infant votives represented the completion of some sort of stage of life. This same site shows little evidence of any connection with female fertility, for it is largely filled with statues of male divinities, and it also lacks anatomical votives and thus it provides no evidence for any association with health. Such finds are problematic for the theory that swaddled infant votives were connected with either reproduction or medicinal functions. Other sites containing swaddled infant votives are situated at liminal spaces within the surrounding geography, such as the sanctuary of Marica, which is located at the mouth of Garigliano river, itself—according to Graham—a place of "transition between land, river, and sea, as well as between marsh and forest." This same site also abounds in votives associated with adolescence, which is also a transitional phase in life, but it lacks any evidence of a cult connected to fertility or healing.

== Stylization ==
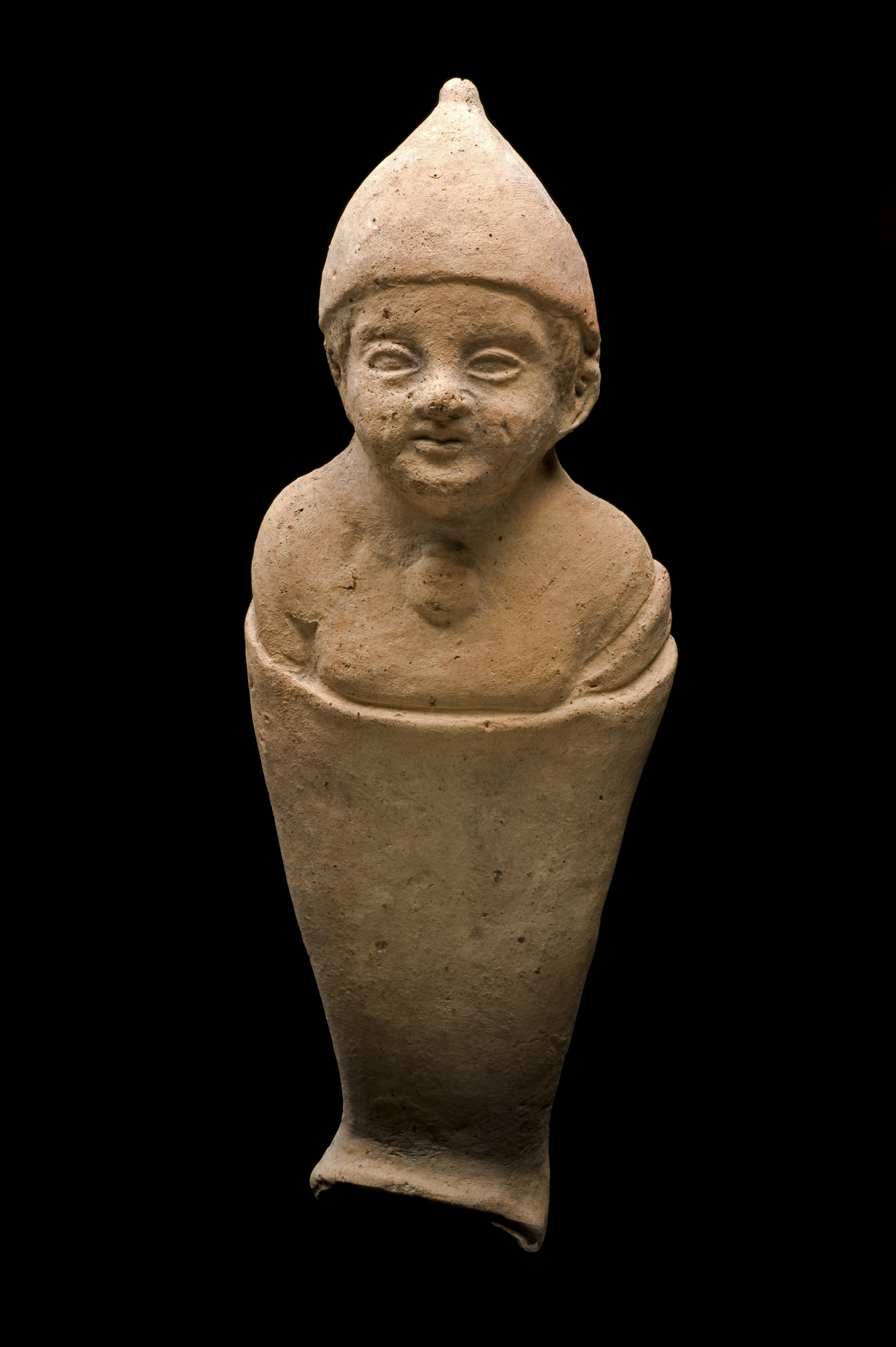
Terracotta swaddled Roman infant votive 200 B.C

Significant stylistic variation existed amongst the swaddled infant votives, with the only unifying characteristic being that they all portrayed the child as tightly wrapped. For instance, just in terms of size, there is a significant difference between the smallest votives, which are 13.2 centimetres (5.2 in) tall and are found at Veii, and the largest votives, which are 84.5 centimetres (33.3 in) in size and are present in sites such as Porta Nord at Vulci. Even swaddled infant votives uncovered at the same site may vary significantly in size and decoration. For example, at Bomarzo, the votives range from 23–63 centimetres (9.1–24.8 in) in size.

These artifacts were crafted through molding processes, almost unilaterally out of terracotta, save for one example from the Forum Appii that was composed of bronze. Multiple molds were used for the face, with entirely separate molds used for the front, feet, or the head. In some cases, the back was also formed via molding, though in others it was instead fashioned by hand or from a flat piece of clay. Molds were evidently reused, as indicated by the presence of certain malformed facial features, such as a flattened nose or a smudged mouth, and—in certain cases—an eye that is higher than the other. In some instances, the ears appear to be missing, for they have been covered by the veils. Two examples from Bomarzo entirely lack faces, containing only an empty hole in the facial region. The absence of a face in these examples is perhaps because the slot had not yet been filled by a sufficient mold, or perhaps because the facial features of these two samples were originally formed from wax.

On the votives where facial features are present, the babies were frequently depicted with characteristically infantile features, such as rounded cheeks and noses, large eyes with heavy lids, large lips, half-smiles, dimples, and double chins. In general, the votives appear to depict infants aged only several months, which corresponds with the forty-to-sixty-day period mentioned by Soranus as the most common timespan for people to have kept their babies in swaddling clothes. Some examples, however, have faces with seemingly more aged characteristics, perhaps as a consequence of the reuse of facial molds from other sculptures intended to depict older individuals. Alternatively, Fridh-Haneson has proposed that the older faces were designed to represent the reincarnated initiates into Orphic cults.

Votive depicting a swaddled infant

In some cases, the clay is modelled so as to represent the binding, though—amongst these votives—there is variation between subtypes; in some, the wrapping extends all the way up to the neck, whereas—on other statuettes—it merely reaches up to the chest. On other votives, the fabric is indicated by marks left by a modelling tool, and still others seem to have had smooth bodies on which the details were painted. Fragments of paint have survived on some artifacts, with one statue from the Fontanile di Legnisina at Vulci and another from the Tiber containing a face covered in red paint, the latter of which is also marked by hair colored with brownish black paint. Other surviving swaddled infant votives have preserved far fewer traces of paint: One infant votive from Ara della Regina has traces of oblique painted lines on its back, and samples from Bomarzo have the remains of white slip that itself may have served as the basis for additional layers of paint. Some infant votives have feet sticking outwards from the swaddling clothes, and in these cases the feet are modeled in detail.

Swaddled infant votive with its feet exposed

The heads of numerous swaddled infants are adorned with caps or covered by a veil. Peaked caps in particular are rare across Italy, and the few known examples of this design feature were all discovered in Campania. This hat probably entered into Etruso-Italic culture via the influence of ancient Greek artwork, wherein conical caps were part of the standard attire for infants. On the votives marked by the veil, it is sometimes wrapped tightly around their head, whereas—on others—it is more lose and it is detailed with realistic folds. Many swaddled infant votives showcase strands of molded or incised hair extending towards their face, protruding from the head coverings, often stretching from the crown to the ears and frequently with a wavy pattern and with a part at the center. Archaeological excavations by the Tiber River at Rome have unearthed examples of swaddled infants with a curled tuft of hair at the center of their forehead. According to Graham, this hairstyle was probably the result of Hellenistic influence and is perhaps a signifier of male gender.

Some swaddled infant votives feature bulla pendants, which were varyingly connected to the sculpture either via inclusion within the molding itself or through manual attachment to the molded torso. Infant votives from sites such as Lavinium and Pisaurum lack any bullae or pendants, whereas sites such as Luceria and Rome yield both decorated and undecorated swaddled votives. However, it is possible that in all cases the bullae were originally adorned with various accessories; they were perhaps sometimes painted on and have since eroded, or some infants might have been ornamented by an actual bulla or pendant, which have since been lost. Paestum is especially unique in regard to the decoration of its votive statues. At Paestum, unlike any other Italian site, some of the swaddled infant votives wear necklaces adorned with multiple amulets, while—throughout the rest of Italy—all other swaddled infants only wear the circular bulla, if they even are bedecked with any pendant at all. Necklaces characterized by multiple pendants appear in ancient Greek art as an accoutrement for infants, and therefore it is probable that their presence in Paestum is the result of Hellenic influence.

== Distribution ==
Swaddled infant votives are exclusive to Italy, where they appear in regions such as Etruria, Latium, Campania. On the Tyrrhenian side of Italy, they extend as far southwards as Paestum, whereas on the Adriatic side, they are found as far south as Lucera. They are primarily found in Etruria, particularly the northern part of the region. There are examples of swaddled infant votives from other parts of Italy, though they are much less frequent. For instance, at the city of Rome, only one swaddled infant has been found at the 'Minerva Medica' deposit in the Esquiline necropolis, while 25 have been found by the Tiber. According to Glinister, these statistics are "not high figures for a city of such magnitude," on which basis he suggests that Rome was merely "one participant in a wider cultural trend." Within central Italy as a whole, the largest sample of swaddled infant votives comes from the sanctuary of Marica by Minturnae, where a set of 48 examples of these artifacts have been found.

Swaddled infant votives in general are relatively rare when compared to anatomical votives in central Italy, with most sites only containing one or two infant votives. Some larger deposits do contain a greater number of infant votives, though—at even these sites—the quantity of swaddled votives is still dwarfed by the other artifacts. For example, at Ara della Regina, there exists a deposit containing a massive hoard of votives, including 300 heads, 200 feet, 233 uteri, and 89 phalli, yet only 25 swaddled infant votives. Moreover, at Gravisca, one deposit included 145 uteri, alongside various other hands, feet, and statuettes, but only 22 infant votives. These infant votives are still rare even at sites with a large preponderance of other fertility-related votives, such as uteri. In fact, Pyrgi—which was known to have been a cult center for various fertility goddesses, such as Uni, Eileithyia, Leucothea—has of only three known swaddling infant votives. However, in defiance of the aforementioned patterns, thousands of swaddled votives appear specifically at the site of Paestum, and—at the sanctuary by Porta Nord at Vulci—the number of swaddled infant votives, totaling 46 artifacts, is greater than that of all other votives from the site.

These votives appear in exclusively votive contexts, though even still there they are found across a great variety of sites: Some have been found near sources of water, such as by rivers or springs—as in Saturnia—or by coastal sanctuaries such as Punta della Vipera and Gravisa. Many swaddled votives have been unearthed at prominent urban sanctuaries, such as the Ara della Regina temple, while others appear at less populus though still urban sites, such as at Vulci. Some have been found at large extra-mural sanctuaries, such as the temple at Castelsecco, which is two kilometers from Arettium. Likewise, others have been found in rural sacred sites on hills or in caves, such as in the Fucine region, and still others have been discovered at border sanctuaries, such as perhaps the ones from Ripa Maiale.

Due to limited stratigraphic and typological data, it is difficult to establish a detailed chronology of these artifacts. Based on what data can evidence can be ascertained, these votives date back to the 4th-century BCE, and they may have continued to be deposited up to the mid 1st-century BCE. At Paestum specifically, it has been conventionally held that the swaddled votives were introduced to the area by Latin colonists following the establishment of a Roman colony at the site in the 273 BCE. However, according to the archaeologist Emanuele Greco, the finding of fragments of swaddled infant votives in layers connected to the amphiprostyle temple, the Italic Temple, and the Forum, indicates that the production of these infant statuettes at Paestum actually began in the 4th-century BCE. Most swaddled infant votives are assigned to the 3rd or 2nd centuries BCE, though this determination is usually not based on any external evidence corroborating their date, but instead on the presumption that this class of artifact as a whole broadly dates to the 3rd-2nd centuries. It is not entirely clear exactly why swaddled infant votives disappeared during the 1st-century BCE. Their fellow artifacts, anatomical votives, also vanished around this same time, likely because their healing functions were superseded by the growth of a formal medical practice in Rome during the 1st-century. For instance, during the 1st-century BCE, the Greek doctor Asclepiades of Bithynia maintained a school of medicine in Rome. However, whereas the swaddled infant votives disappeared at the same time as the anatomical votives, it is not certain that both fell into disuse for the same reason.

== See also ==
- Childhood in ancient Rome
- Mater Matuta
- Votive offering
- List of Roman fertility deities
- Swaddling
- Votive babies
