= Temple of Fortuna Muliebris =

Ancient temple in Rome, Italy

Coordinates: 41°59′N 12°33′E

- Interactive map of Temple of Fortuna Muliebris
- Type: Temple
- Location: Fourth milestone of the Via Latina
- Region: Rome

History
- Built: 486 BCE
- Abandoned: Unknown

The Temple of Fortuna Muliebris was a temple in ancient Rome dedicated by Proculus Verginius Tricostus Rutilus in 486 BC to the goddess Fortuna and located at the fourth milestone of the Via Latina. It was founded on behalf of the Roman women who opposed the war of Gaius Marcius Coriolanus and the Volsci against Rome, commemorating their role in ending Coriolanus' advance on the city. The temple was dedicated in 486 BCE after the war and was formally founded in 493 BCE. Aside from some inscriptions recording restoration work in the Roman imperial period, no remains of the temple exist and the date it went into disuse is unknown.

== History ==
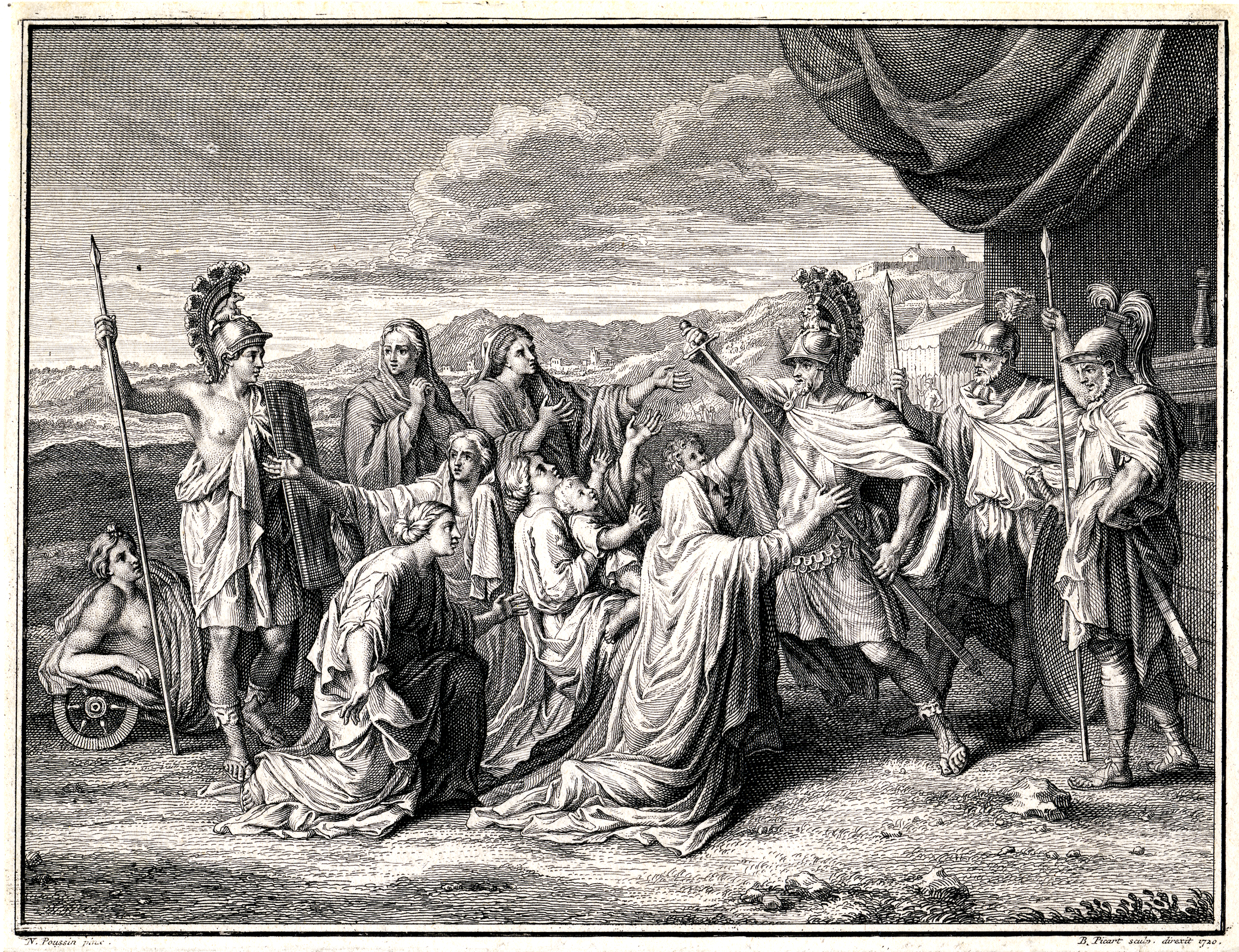
Veturia, Volumnia, and other women confront Coriolanus

=== Coriolanus and the Volsci ===
Ancient authors Dionysius of Halicarnassus, Valerius Maximus, and Livy all record the story of the exiled Roman Gnaeus (or Gaius) Marcius Coriolanus joining forces the Volsci, an Italian tribe that were enemies of Rome. Coriolanus reportedly led a Volscian army to the outskirts of Rome, where they set up a camp and attempted to besiege the city. Though the Roman senate sent several envoys to negotiate with Coriolanus for peace, Coriolanus rejected all of their offers and the Roman army began to prepare for the siege.

Frustrated with the lack of action from the men of Rome, a group of women gathered to come up with their own plan to stop the war. Dionysius of Halicarnassus records a woman named Valeria as the leader of the women. The collective of women then sought out Veturia, Coriolanus's mother, and Volumnia, his wife to ask them to join their ranks and beseech Coriolanus to end the war. Valeria is credited with convincing Veturia, who was resistant as she did not believe he would listen to her, who then brought Volumnia and Volumnia's two young sons to Coriolanus's camp, along with the rest of the women.

Coriolanus initially met his mother, wife, and sons in private, but Veturia insisted on addressing him in front of the troops. Once they had an audience, Veturia gave a long, passionate speech begging him to end his advance and lay down his arms. Volumnia and his sons did not join in the speech, but they wept and knelt by Volumnia while the other women surrounded them in support. Eventually, Coriolanus agreed to his mother's demands and surrendered.

=== Founding of the Temple ===
The Roman senate decided to honor the women for their role in ending the war with a reward, and the women decided that they wanted a temple built to Fortuna Muliebris to honor all women. Though the women initially raised their own funds to build the temple, the senate refused to use them and paid for the founding themselves. Still wanting to use their own funds, the women used the money to dedicate a second cult statue instead. The temple was dedicated by the consul Proculus Verginius Tricostus Rutilus in the year 486 BCE. The temple itself was not completed until 493 BCE.

The legitimacy of the Coriolanus story has been debated by scholars, with some believing it was a later invention to justify the building of the temple.

== Cult practices ==
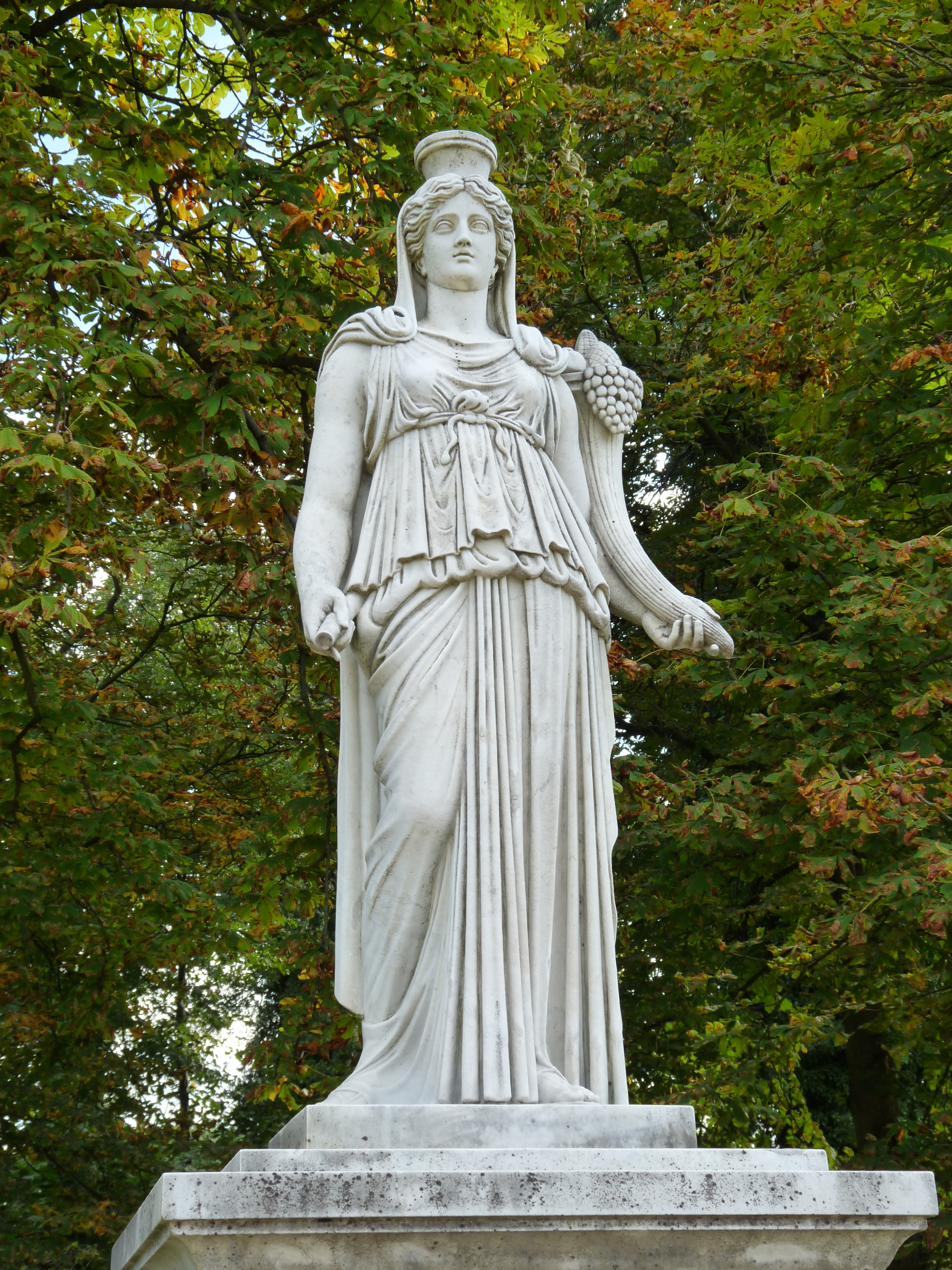
The goddess Fortuna.

=== Fortuna Muliebris ===
Roman worship of Fortuna as the goddess of luck and fortune was common, and multiple versions of her existed with different epithets used to highlight different aspects of the goddess. Fortuna Muliebris is one such variant of the goddess, with the epithet "Muliebris" (Latin for "woman's" or "womanly") referring to her role as a Fortuna specifically oriented towards women. Worship of Fortuna Muliebris seems to have been associated with this temple specifically, commemorating the combined efforts of the Roman women to protect the city.

=== Cult statues ===
The temple had two cult statues of Fortuna Muliebris. The presence of two statues is unusual in Roman temples, where there was typically a singular statue of the deity the temple was dedicated to for worship, rather than two. The first cult statue was dedicated by and funded by the Roman senate at the same time as the temple, while the second cult statue was sponsored by the women of Rome, using the funds they had initially raised to fund the temple itself. According to Dionysius of Halicarnassus, this second cult statue spoke twice, once when it was first set up and a second time when a larger crowd was present. The statue is said to have praised the women for doing a good deed by dedicating it to the goddess, with two ancient authors recording different versions of this brief speech. As recorded by Dionysius of Halicarnassus, the statue said "'you have conformed to the holy law of the city, matrons, in dedicating me.'" Valerius Maximus records the statue's words as "'in due manner have you seen me, matrons, and in due manner dedicated me.'"

=== Priestesses ===
The first priestess of the temple was Valeria, according to Dionysius of Halicarnassus. She was collectively chosen by the Roman women to hold the position after her role in stopping the war, and she performed the first sacrifice at the temple's altar one year after the end of the war. These first sacrificial rites were held prior to the building of the temple and its cult statues, but were established as annual rites by the senate after they heard about the cult statue's speech, and were performed each year by the presiding priestess. Valeria's selection by the women, rather than the senate, was not uncommon during the Roman Republic. In the event of needing a priestess or needing to address a religious issue regarding women, the Roman senate would allow a group of married women (called matrons) to select a representative from among themselves to address the problem.

Though there are no other women recorded as holding the position of the priestess of Fortuna Muliebris, Valeria evidently was allowed to establish early rules for worship in the temple. The women at the time of the founding of the temple, under Valeria's orders, restricted the ability to touch or adorn the cult statues to women who had only been married once, so that the goddess could only be worshiped by newly-wed or single-wed women. That the priesthood was held by a woman was not particularly unusual in ancient Rome, as several state religious officials were women, like the Vestal Virgins who served as the priestesses of the goddess Vesta. Many religious positions held by Roman women were subject to specific rules regarding marriage or virginity, like the rules Valeria created.

== Restorations in later antiquity ==
The only architectural remains of the temple are fragments of a marble slab, found at the fourth mile marker on the Via Latina. An inscription on the fragments references a restoration made to the temple by Livia, the wife of the first Roman emperor Augustus, during the early 1st century CE. The exact date of the restoration work is unknown. A second restoration was completed by the empress Julia Domna and her family during the Severan period, as indicated by a second inscription on the same marble fragment bearing Livia's name. As with Livia's contribution, the work completed during this restoration is unknown. No other remains exist and no records of abandonment or destruction have been found. With the lack of substantial remains, and the questionable historicity of the origin story of Coriolanus, the existence of this temple may be called into question.

== See also ==
- List of Ancient Roman temples
