= Fondo Patturelli =

- Fondo Patturelli (Italian)
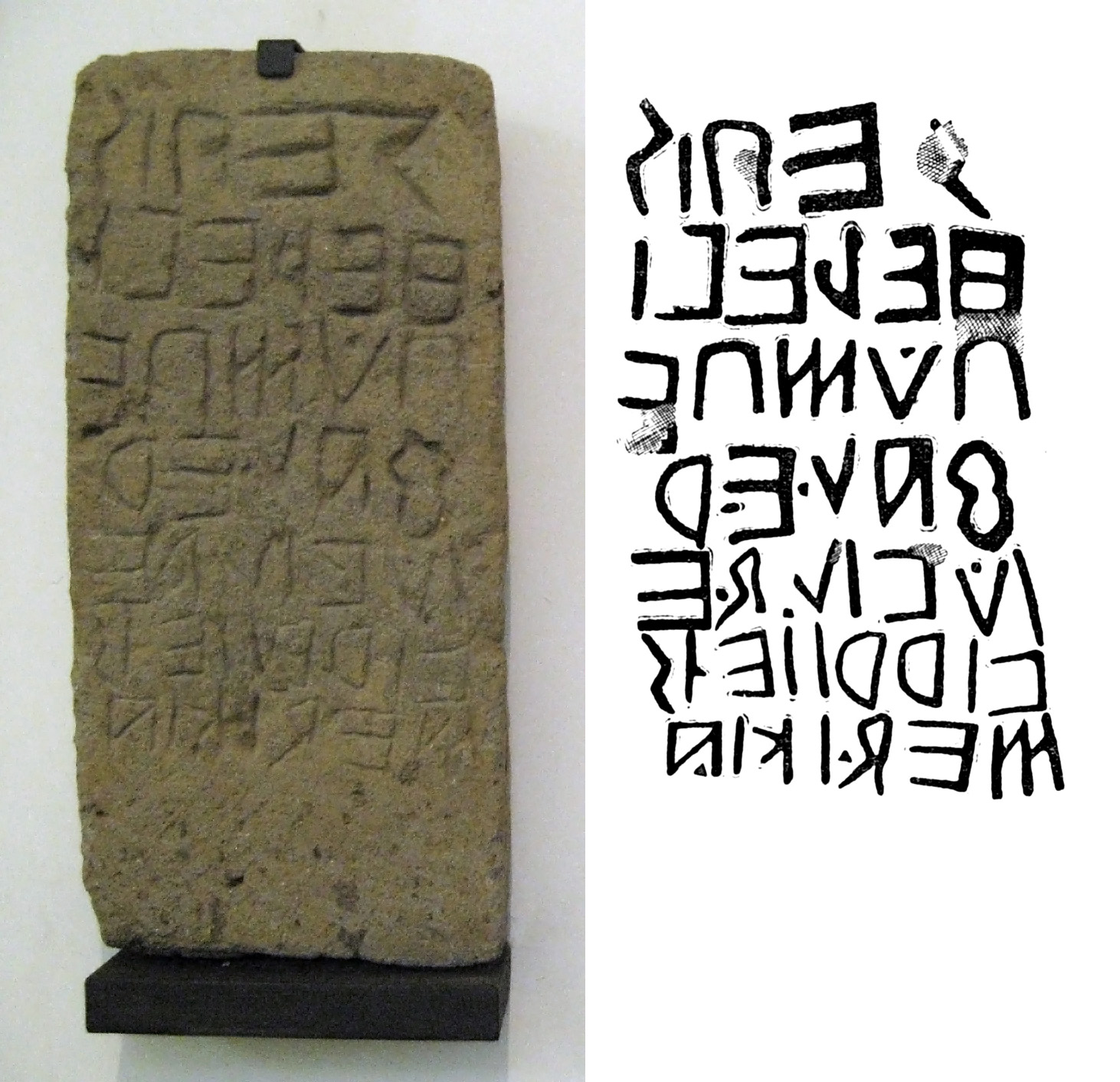
- Oscan inscription uncovered at the site
- Type: sanctuary, sacred grove
- Cultures: Osci, Ancient Rome
- Location: Campania, Italy

Site notes
- Archaeologists: Carlo Patturelli
- Discovered: 1845

The Fondo Patturelli, also called the Fondo Petrara, is an archaeological site in Campania, Italy. The site, now located in modern Curti, was once situated nearby the city of Capua.

== Excavation ==
In 1845, excavators uncovered a podium of tufa, and an altar on what was then the property of the Patturelli family. These initial discoveries were destroyed by the owner of the property, though they did attempt to sketch descriptions of the remains. The original excavator, Carlo Patturelli, reported that artifacts of different periods were discovered in the same layers, perhaps indicating that the site had been intentionally vandalized. However, the historian Michael Crawford argues that these discrepancies are more likely attributable to faulty archaeological methodology. According to Crawford, the ancient coins uncovered at the site belong to the same time frame, which indicates that there was little tampering with the artifacts during Roman times. Crawford suggests that the claim of a preexisting disturbance at the site was likely an intentional propagated by the Patturelli family, possibly with the knowing support of Friedrich von Duhn, designed to conceal their own guilt and mismanagement of the excavation. According to Gennaro Riccio, an individual involved with the 1845 excavation, the Patturelli family had repurposed blocks from the site for personal usage. This account contradicts the story of the Patturelli family themselves, who reported that the original construction blocks remained in place unaltered. Crawford suggests that the Patturelli family had merely lied about the state of the archaeological site to obfuscate their own illicit and disruptive activities. Furthermore, Crawford argues that the false assumption that the site is a necropolis was originally propagated by Giovanii Patturelli, who perhaps sought to minimize the extent of the criminal excavations by reducing the area to merely a tomb. Later, legal excavations were undertaken in 1873, although they were poorly managed.

== Artifacts ==
The artifact assemblage at the site includes roof tiles, ceramics, and votive terracottas, the last of which can itself be assigned to two distinct periods of production. The first period lasted from around 423 to 304 BCE, whereas the second lasted from 304 to 211 BCE. Tuff statues depicting women holding up to twelve newborn infants, have also been uncovered at the site. According to the archaeologist Francesca Mermati, it is perhaps possible that the quantity of babies depicted in the mother-statues related in some manner to the wealth of the suppliant. Outside of Fondo Patturelli, these statues are paralleled by other Italic votive heads that are typically situated nearby depictions of swaddled infants or babies. The majority of votive objects uncovered within the area are of poor-quality, indicating that the site—although popular—was largely frequented by less-affluent individuals.

Alongside the aforementioned artifacts, sets of Oscan stelae have been excavated, seventeen of which are composed of terracotta and nine of volcanic tuff. Of these stelae, the vast majority are damaged or compromised in some manner, with only five or six surviving in a somewhat unblemished state. Crawford dates these texts to the time frame between 330 and 250 BCE. One inscription mentions a sacred grove or lúvkeí (from Proto-Italic *loukos), which may imply that the site itself functioned as such a grove. There was an altar at the site placed atop a podium of tufa and ashlar itself located nearby a staircase, though the original excavation documents do not properly record its position.

According to the Etruscologist Jacques Heurgon, the evidence from the early periods of the site attest to worship of a nature goddess. In particular, Heurgon notes that two 6th-century BCE antefixes respectively depict a female figure holding birds and a woman riding horseback, the latter of whom may be identified with Artemis. Other antefixes from the site dating to the 5th-century BCE portray women accompanied by felines. However, later evidence indicates that the site honored some sort of goddess associated with motherhood and childbirth, though it is not clear exactly which deity was honored. According to the archaeologist Massimiliano Di Fazio, it is likely that the specific variety of worship at the site combined features of the Italic goddess Ceres, the Greek deity Demeter, and the Etruscan divinity Uni. Patturelli additionally records the presence of a supposed marble statue at the site, though Crawford argues that he had likely misidentified a limestone statue.

Various Oscan inscriptions near the site mention the terms damu, damuse, and damsennias, which imply a relationship with the Roman goddess Damia, who was herself stated by Festus to be identical with Bona Dea. The sanctuary is situated nearby a cemetery, perhaps indicating that the site propitiated a deity with chthonic characteristics such as Aphrodite. However, the cemetery was likely established at a later date. In 1843, shortly prior to the discovery of the Fondo Patturelli, a Roman necropolis was uncovered accidentally during the construction of a railway from Caserta to Capua. Crawford suggests that this discovery may have sparked early interpretations of the Fondo Patturelli as a cemetery, though there is still no evidence of gravesites located in close proximity to the Patturelli sanctuary itself.

Alternatively, another inscription—referred to as the Tabula Capuana—found engraved upon a terracotta roof tile mentions the name of the goddess Uni, who therefore may have been connected to the site. Yet, it is unlikely that this inscription was uncovered near the Fondo Patturelli, as research by the Etruscologist Mauro Cristofani indicates that it was instead discovered by the Quattordici Ponti. The classicist Robert Conway argues, on the basis of the dedications found at the site, that the goddess propriated at the site is undoubtedly to be identified with Juno Lucina.
