= Bulla (amulet) =

Amulet worn by Ancient Roman infants

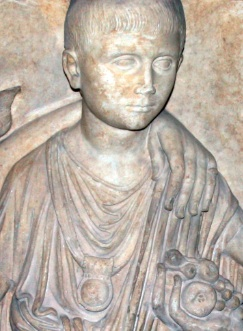
Detail from a relief showing a Roman boy wearing a bulla

Etruscan female lasa depicted wearing a bulla.

3rd-century BCE Bronze statuette depicting an Etruscan boy wearing a bulla and holding a bird.

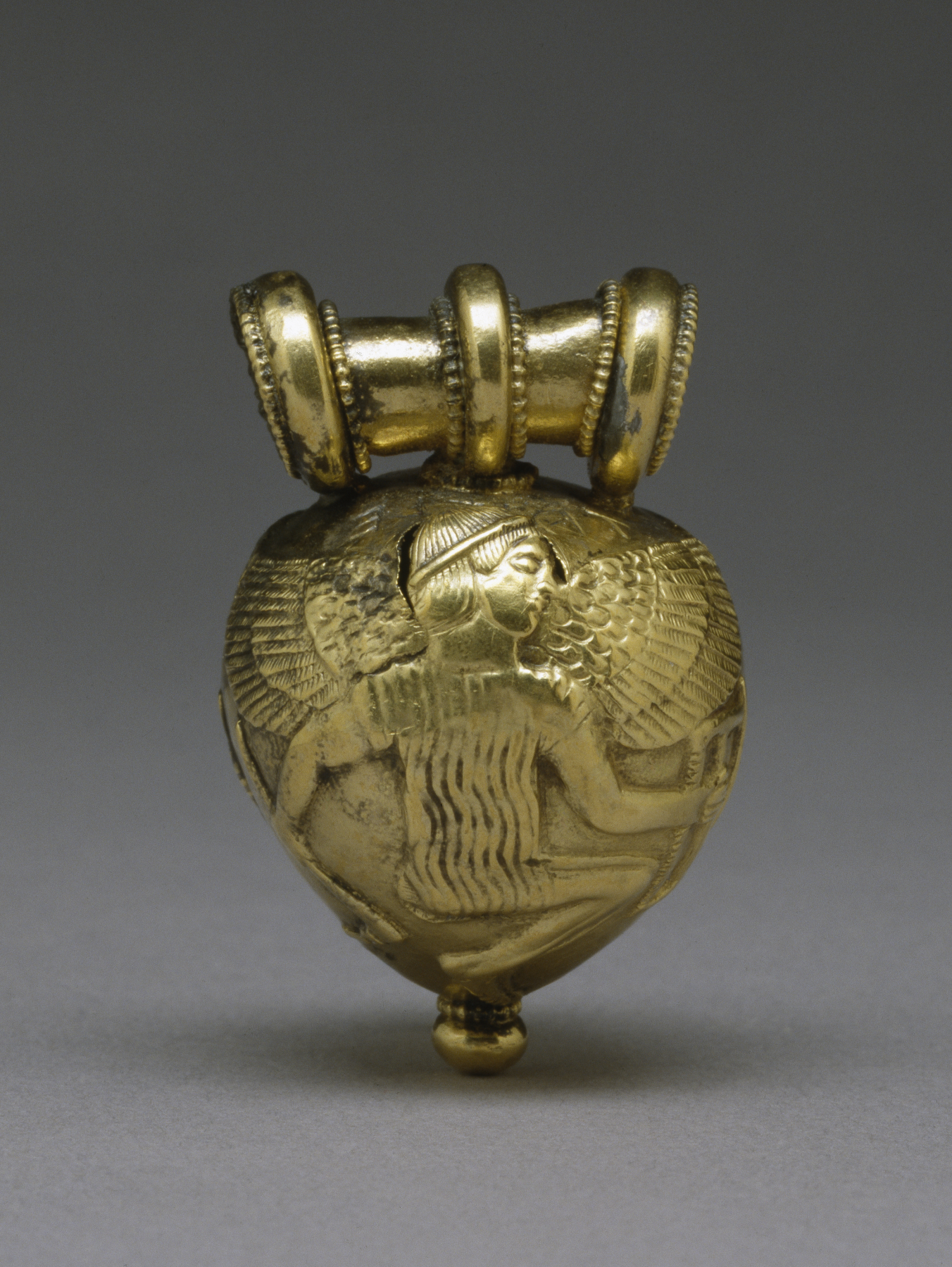
Etruscan bulla depicting Icarus

3rd-century BCE golden bulla of Etruscan workmanship depicting a man between two genii.

A bulla, an amulet worn like a locket, was given to male children in Ancient Rome nine days after birth. Inside the medallion, an amulet was placed, which was usually a phallus – a symbol that brought good luck in antiquity. Rather similar objects are rare finds from Late Bronze Age Ireland.

== Etrusco-Latial bullae ==
Roman authors sometimes ascribe an Etruscan origin to the bullae, with the 2nd-century grammarian Festus stating the bullae derived from the attire of Etruscan kings, and the 1st-century historian Plutarch recounting a story wherein the Etruscan king of Rome, Tarquinius Priscus, was the first to bequeath the amulet to his son. Alternatively, other Roman authors instead claim that the bulla dates back to the time of Romulus. Macrobius claims that, following the rape of Sabine women, so as to console the abducted brides, Romulus offered to award a golden bulla to the child of whichever woman was the first to give birth to a son, which ended being Hersilia. The earliest archaeological attestations of the bullae date back to the 8th-century BCE, and they appear across Etruria, Latium, and Campania.

The style of bullae found later in Rome is precedented by a type of circular bivalve pendants that appear during the Early Iron Age. Several examples of such bullae survive in the Arvid Andrén collection in the Museum of Cultural History in Oslo, one of which consists of a thin bronze sheet folded into a circular shape topped by a cylindrical suspension tube. The edges of this artifact are flattened and are marked by numerous embossed dots. Another example of a bivalve bulla, also from the same collection at Oslo, is similarly composed of a thin bronze sheet flattened into a circular shape and topped with a cylindrical suspension tube, and it also has the same set of studded dots extending across the edges of the pendant and even on the suspension tube. This second example of an Iron Age bulla is, however, less regularly shaped; even the dots on the edge are unusually spaced, with the studs on the top part of the pendant extending upwards into an upside-down V rather than a circular pattern. According to Andrén himself, the reason for the atypical placement of the studs is likely that the sheet of metal used to create the bulla was once intended for a different purpose. Another style of bivalve bullae that included riveted edges was widespread throughout Central Italy from the second half of the 8th to the 6th century BCE, with the earliest examples appearing at Osteria dell'Osa and Veii. Typologically, the archaeologist Cristiano Iaia has designated the bivalve bullae as "proper bullae," whereas a circular amulet composed of one singular sheet is instead classified as a "bulla pendant." Iaia argues that the "proper bulla" type is associated with upper-class burials, whereas the "bulla pendant" type is associated with young women's graves, and perhaps was originally connected with unmarried girls.

Etruscan depictions of individuals wearing bulla usually portray the subject adorned with a single pendant hanging from the neck, though they sometimes alternatively showcase a series of multiple pendants extending across the body. Bullae in Etruria were not exclusive to the upper-class, for one artwork in the Tomb of Orcus II showcases a young, nude boy who wears a bulla. He is most likely a slave, as indicated by his nudity and his position—he is standing next to a cabinet filled with metal vessels—and yet, he is wearing a golden armband and a bulla. Moreover, Etruscan bullae were evidently not reserved for boys, as an early 2nd-century BCE Etruscan sarcophagus belonging to a girl named Ranza Curunei portrays her wearing a bulla across her breast. Some, though not all, Central Italian swaddled infant votives contain depictions of bulla-like pendants placed on their chests. When a protective amulet is present on these swaddled infant votives, it is always a circular bulla pendant.

Besides serving as protective amulets for children, Etruscan bullae may have also played some role in the official outfits of certain high-status officials. For example, one 4th-century BCE Etruscan sarcophagus from Caere showcases an adult bearded individual wearing two bands draped across both his neck and his left arm, each with bullae and amphora-shaped pendants. Moreover, this particular figure is ornamented with a flat leaf wreath on his head and a garland of flowers across his chest. On the basis of the details of his outfit, alongside accompanying scenes on his sarcophagus, archaeologists have identified him as some important magistrate, in which case the bullae perhaps functioned as markers of his office. The archaeologist Andrea Zifferrero has suggested that the presence of lentoid pendants functioned as markers of hereditary status for Late Villanovan elites. However, according to the archaeologist Larissa Bonfante, the practice of adult Etruscan men wearing bullae around their arms was intended to protect the wearer against the evil eye.

Excavations at the Early Iron Age Quattro Fontanili cemetery in Veii revealed four bulla-type circular pendants, which came from three graves, all of which were dated to the Veii IIC phase. Only grave containing a bulla belonged to a child—that being, an 8–9-year-old girl, whereas another bulla-containing grave belonged to a 25-year-old woman. According to the archaeologist Katarína Hladíková, given the presence of the bullae in adult graves, and in burials with larger pits, it can be concluded that the bullae were not exclusively connected with children and must have had a broader social function than in ancient Rome. Similarly, in Valle Trebba, out of a sample of twenty tombs containing bullae, only one definitely belonged to a child, whereas three were identified as belonging to adults. Etruscan bulla were also seemingly not reserved for humans, as a strap of ten bronze bullae have been uncovered at Populonia attached to the skull of a horse.

== Roman bullae ==
Hinge of a Roman bulla found in Geldeston, Norfolk. The artifact is made from gilded bronze.

Topview of the Roman bulla found in a vineyard in Latium

Sideview of the Roman bulla found in a vineyard in Latium

Statue of a Roman man wearing a bulla

=== Design ===
The Latin word bulla does not exclusively refer to the amulet; it also can describe any round or globular object, with the 6th-century author Isidore of Seville even claiming that the type of amulet was only named as such on account of its roundness. On this basis, the historian Magdolna Szilagyi concludes that, when Roman sources utilize the term bulla, they must only ever mean a specifically round item, though—amongst modern archaeologists—the term bulla denotes both globular and tubular amulets, for they both appear to have had similar functions. Bullae consisted of a round pendant topped with a loop, through which some wire or cord would be placed, allowing for the suspension of the bulla from the neck. Bullae were usually fashioned from two rounded or teardrop-shaped metal plates attached to each other either via soldering or hammering or a hinge. Amongst a sample of 80 bullae from Transdanubia, to hold the capsule of the bullae together, the ancient manufacturer either soldered the rims of two convex plates or cut out at the edge of one plate several triangular pieces that were then folded over the other plate.

In Roman Hispania, the majority of surviving bullae are formed from bronze, though there are some examples of silver, copper, or gold bullae. Likewise, in Pannonia, the vast majority of bullae were composed of bronze—out of a set of 75 bullae, only three were made of silver and four from gold. Given that certain bronzes can resemble gold when they are well-polished, it is possible that many bronze bullae were designed to imitate gold, though it is not possible to determine whether any surviving bullae actually underwent any maintenance procedures to preserve their gold-like appearance. During the Republic and early Empire, bullae were largely undecorated, save for the loops, though by the later Imperial period even the loops usually lacked adornments. Out of the aforementioned Pannonian sample, the bronze bullae are rarely decorated, whereas the select few silver or gold bullae usually have additional ornamentation. For instance, various Pannonian gold and silver bullae are ornamented with ribbing; one particular example of a gold bulla from Aquincum has loops bedecked with longitudinal ribs alongside radiating ribs dotting its capsule, whereas two other gold bullae, one also from Aquincum and the other from Kő, merely have loops marked by longitudinal ribs. Some bullae had names, presumably those of their wearers, inscribed atop them. One example, discovered in a vineyard about twelve miles from Rome on the way to Albano, contains the letters HOST. HOS. (likely short for Hostus Hostilianus) written longitudinally across the middle of the embossed plate that itself forms the upper part of the artifact.

Some bullae were hollow, leaving an open space for the inclusion of some apotropaic item. Various different types of objects have been uncovered in bullae, such as vegetal items. For instance, one silver bulla uncovered from Via Sepulcral Romana contains an empty space in which vine was stored. Common organic substances found in bullae include medicinal herbs, dried grapes, rose thorns, Coriandrum sativum, or Pimpinella anisum. In certain cases, the vegetal item was itself wrapped in some other object. For example, at Intercisa, some examples of bullae contained plants wrapped in textiles; at Keszthely-Dobogó, a bulla was found containing a coriander seed encased in leaves; and at the Plaça de la Villa de Madrid in Barcelona, a sample of bulla containing coriander seeds also wrapped in leaves. According to the archaeologist Lidia González Estrada, the ancient Romans likely believed that "sensory or aromatic" properties of these plant items contributed to their medicinal value, which in turn enhanced the remedial or prophylactic function of the bulla itself.

Besides plant matter, one bulla from Keszthely-Dobogó was found containing wood, one gold bulla from Aquincum contained sand, and another gold bulla—also from Aquincum—contained a coin of Trajan alongside a folded silver plate marked by a Greek inscription. Analysis of one copper alloy bulla from a mid 4th-early 5th century tomb of a deceased 2-3 year-old infant in the Štrbinci cemetery, which is located near Đakovo, revealed that the artifact contained a clump of beeswax. Regarding the symbolism of this substance, the archaeologist Branka Migotti suggests a possible connection with the afterlife, noting that portraits of the deceased and the torches used to light funerary ceremonies at night were both composed of beeswax in Roman society. Alternatively, Migotti suggests that the presence of beeswax could merely indicate that the deceased's family worked as beekeepers. Some bullae contained miniature statuettes of deities, such as one bulla from Carnuntum, which included a figurine depicting the god Harpocrates. Likewise, another bulla found in a tomb near Rome was attached to a small statue of Isis.

There is perhaps also evidence indicating that Roman bullae contained imagery depicting a phallus. Macrobius, a 5th-century Roman historian, writes that—during a triumph—the general would wear a bulla containing within it remedies believed to be effective against the evil eye. However, archaeological excavations have yet to yield any example of a miniature phallus situated within a bulla, though researchers have discovered numerous miniature phalli across multiple Roman sites, some of which perhaps could have been stored in bullae. For instance, one small phallus dated to the 1st-century BCE from Oplontis lacked any ring at its base through which it could have been connected to a string or chain, meaning that the owner would likely have had to store it directly. within some object, such as perhaps a bulla. This particular phallus from Oplontis is only 18 millimetres (0.71 in) in length, and therefore could have fit inside of a bulla. Other evidence suggests that phalli were also used separately as protective amulets independently, in which case they were known as the fascinus.

=== Roman boys ===
In some Roman accounts of the event wherein someone receives this amulet, it is bestowed upon them by their father. For instance, Plutarch recounts a story wherein Tarquinius Superbus showed great ferocity in a battle against the Latins and the Etruscans and thus was awarded the bulla by his father. Pliny the Elder provides a slightly different version of the story, claiming that Tarquin, while still young enough to wear the toga praetexta, was granted the amulet after having slain an enemy in battle. According to the archaeologist Véronique Dasen, since the bulla was given by the father, it may have been granted to a child on the dies lustricus—the day when an infant was officially introduced into the paternal line. However, there is also evidence that other family members could grant a child a bulla, for Suetonius—a 1st-century CE historian—wrote that, as an infant, Tiberius received several golden bullae as a gift from Pompeia Magna.

The bulla was primarily associated with young boys, and consequently it functioned as a symbol of childhood. For instance, Juvenal, a 2nd-century poet, sarcastically addresses an old man as "most worthy of the bulla" ("senior bulla dignissime"), thereby demonstrating the youthful connotations of bulla through irony. When Roman boys came of age as a citizen, they disposed of their childhood accoutrements, placing their bulla in the care of their parental household deities (Lares), before they then assumed the toga virilis ("toga of manhood"). Even more specifically, the bulla was reserved for freeborn boys, and it was therefore also symbolic of freeborn status in Roman culture. Plutarch says as much in his Roman Questions, wherein he inquires as to the origin of this practice and proposes a theory that the Romans of old stigmatized the act of maintaining a sexual relationship with boys of free birth, and thus they created the bulla so as to unambiguously mark one as such, thereby preventing confusion between slave boys—which were socially acceptable to love romantically—and freeborn boys. In Roman monuments from the late Republic and early Empire depicting the families of freed slaves, it was common for the children to wear bullae, thereby representing their freeborn status. For former slaves, the bullae likely served as a means of proudly proclaiming their newly acquired status as freed men by showcasing their now freeborn children. For instance, in one Roman portrait, a five-year-old boy named Publius Albius Memor, who was the son of former slaves, is depicted wearing a large bulla. The children of slaves were naturally denied the right of wearing this amulet. For example, one particular sculpture depicting members of the Gavii family showcases the child, named Gaius Gavius Rufus, wearing a toga, a garment only available to free Roman citizens, indicating that he was free at the time when the artwork was created. Yet, since Rufus is not depicted wearing a bulla, it is possible that his father, a man named Spurius, was still a slave at the time when Rufus was born.

The bulla is also frequently associated with upper-class individuals in Roman literature. Pliny the Elder, for instance, explicitly states that the bulla was worn exclusively by the children of equestrians. Macrobius records that the 2nd-century BCE politician Scipio Aemilianus, in one of his orations, lamented that a Roman boy adorned with the bulla, who was the son of someone seeking to hold office, was dancing in a manner that would supposedly be disgraceful for a slave. Moreover, Plutarch writes that the Roman general Sertorius—during an attempt to Romanize the Iberian elite—presented their children with golden bullae. According to Estrada, this incident also showcases the use of the bulla as a mark of Roman cultural identity—by gifting bullae to these Iberian boys, Sertorius was essentially granting them "access to Roman privileges." Some Roman authors describe a particular type of leather strap worn around the necks that was used a substitute for the bulla by poorer individuals. According to Pliny the Elder, all children outside of the equestrian class had had to wear this leather strap ("lorum"). However, Macrobius states this type of alternative amulet was reserved for the children of freedmen who had been born of the "rightful mater familias" (i.e. who had been born of a legitimate marriage). This same leather item is once more referenced by Juvenal, who establishes a contrast between those who, in their childhood, wore the "Etruscan gold [bulla]" ("Etruscum aurum") with those who wore the leather knot considered symbolic of a poor man ("nodus tantum et signum de paupere loro").

Bullae were also very valuable items. Cicero, in his Verrine Orations, writes that Verres's nephew Junius had been reduced to poverty and deprived of his patrimony, forcing him to sell his bulla. Cicero states that the loss of his bulla induced much sympathy amongst the public, who felt great sorrow at him being relieved of "the boy’s jewel that his father had given him, the sign and token of his happier fortune." Furthermore, Suetonius writes that—following the assassination of Julius Caesar—women tossed their jewelry and their children's bullae onto the funeral pyre. Additionally, Livy describes an event in 210 BCE wherein the Roman senators agreed to donate their own personal gold, silver, or bronze so as to fund a new fleet. Senators were, however, permitted to keep certain items, including the bullae for their sons. Due to their immense importance, bullae were not usually discarded; they would be placed aside when the boy reached adulthood but nevertheless kept in the family. One particular archaeological dig in Colchester unearthed an ancient box filled with valuables, all likely buried in response to the news of Boudica's coming assault on the city. This box contained numerous items of personal adornment, including—alongside various military decorations—a small copper-alloy bulla, that likely belonged to the owner of the house, who evidently retained the object into adulthood. The reluctance to abandon the bullae explains their scarcity in funerary contexts, for burying the deceased with the bullae would have also entailed relinquishing possessing of the amulet.

Some modern sources interpret Macrobius's single reference to an amulet worn by a triumphal general during his procession as evidence that the childhood bulla was also a standard item of triumphal regalia. If the bulla was worn during the triumph, it would congrue with other pieces of triumphal garments that are also of Etruscan origin, such as the toga purpurea and the tunica palmata.

=== Roman girls ===
A Roman girl did not wear a bulla per se, but another kind of amulet called a lunula, until the eve of her marriage, when it was removed along with her childhood toys and other things. She would then stop wearing child's clothes and start wearing women's Roman dress. According to the historian Lena Larsson Lovén, there is no known visual evidence showcasing a Roman girl wearing a bulla, though there are known depictions of Roman families that explicitly do not portray a girl wearing a bulla. For instance, one relief from Rome dated to around 50 CE showcases a family consisting of one man, one woman, and two children, one of whom is a buy adorned with the bulla, and the other is a girl who lacks any amulet. Besides evidence from sculpture, there is also some literary evidence suggesting that Roman girls could wear bullae: In a passage from Plautus's The Rope, the character of Palaestra describes receiving a golden bulla from her father for her birthday. Though, this is a comedic play, and therefore it may have intentionally subverted or satirized social norms for the sake of humor. Additionally, this particular play is also an adaptation of a Greek original, which further obfuscates the extent to which the practices depicted therein are representative of Roman culture. Archaeological evidence has also corroborated the notion that girls could sometimes wear bullae, for—in Roman Spain—bullae have been uncovered in several graves that likely belonged to females, itself indicated by the other burial goods, such as spindle whorls, needles, mirrors, and acus crinales. Similarly, a study on thirty-two individuals buried with bullae in Pannonia revealed that, of this sample, twenty-two were children, eight were adult women, and two were adult men. Szilagyi suggests that the practice of women adorning themselves with bullae was probably a provincial custom particular to Pannonia. Regarding the origin of this custom, Szilagyi notes that—according to epigraphical data—women and children in Pannonia were subject to exceptionally high mortality rates, perhaps motivating the usage of protective amulets amongst these groups.

== Bronze Age Ireland ==
A small number of bullae have been found in Ireland; they are called "bullae" based on their resemblance to the Roman form. (Note: Other than superficial resemblance, Irish and Roman bullae have no known connection.) The Irish bullae so far found were made of base metal (Note: Irish bullae are usually made of lead, but also tin. Bullae made of clay are rare.) – sometimes clay – covered with a folded over piece of gold foil. The Irish bullae date to the Late Bronze Age, about 1150–750 BCE.

They were presumably worn suspended round the neck with a cord running through the hole below the flat top. The body of the bulla has roughly vertical sides before making a semi-circle or inverted pointed arch at the bottom. The gold is incised with geometrical decoration.

Whether they were purely for adornment or had an amuletic or other function is unclear. Despite the small weight of gold used they would have been available only for elite groups.

== See also ==
- Shropshire bulla
- Bulla (seal)
- Swaddled infant votive
