= Martin Copley =

Australian conservationist

Martin Copley (1940 – 30 July 2014) was a British-born Australian conservationist and philanthropist who established the Australian Wildlife Conservancy (AWC), an organisation which purchases and manages large areas of land, mainly former pastoral properties, as nature reserves (called "sanctuaries") for the conservation of biodiversity. He was the grandson of pioneering Australian pastoralist and banker S. W. Copley.

Copley was a British financier and insurance underwriter. He first visited Australia in 1966. In 1991 he purchased a property containing a large area of natural bushland at Chidlow, Western Australia, now the Karakamia Sanctuary, for conservation purposes, effectively founding what was to become the AWC. In 1994 he moved to Australia permanently. In 2001 the AWC became a public charitable organisation. Copley died of cancer on 30 July 2014.
