= Saint Homobonus =

Patron saint of business people and of Cremona (died 1197)

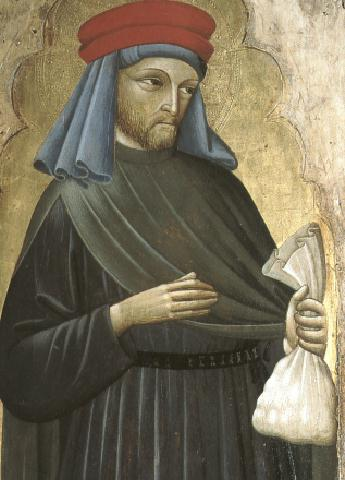

Confessor
- Born: 12th century Cremona, Lombardy, Italy
- Died: November 13, 1197; Cremona, Lombardy, Italy
- Venerated in: Catholic Church
- Canonized: January 12, 1199 by Pope Innocent III
- Major shrine: Cremona; his head is preserved in the church of Saint Giles
- Feast: November 13
- Attributes: Bag of money; merchant’s robes, accompanying beggar
- Patronage: entrepreneurs, tailors, shoemakers, clothworkers, Cremona, business people

Saint Homobonus (Italian: Sant'Omobono, German: Sankt Gutmann, Lombard: San Mobon) is the patron saint of business people, tailors, shoemakers, and clothworkers, as well as of Cremona, Italy.

He was canonized in 1199 at the urgent request of the citizens of Cremona. He died on November 13, 1197, and his feast day is celebrated on November 13.

== Life ==
Homobonus was a cloth merchant from Cremona, northern Italy. Born Omobono Tucenghi, he was a married layman who believed that God had allowed him to work in order that he would be able to support people living in a state of poverty. His name is derived from the Latin homo bonus ("good man").

Homobonus was able to pursue this calling in life easily as a result of the inheritance he received from his father, a prosperous tailor and merchant. He practiced his business at Cremona with scrupulous honesty. Though he and his wife were well off, they lived and dressed simply as Homobonus gave much of their money away. He devoted himself to the practice of the spiritual and corporal works of mercy, and attended to the burial of the abandoned dead.

A legend says that while travelling, he gave all his food and drink to a beggar and as he refilled his flask from a stream, the water miraculously turned into wine.

It was his custom every night to go to the church of St. Giles, a little before midnight, and to assist at matins. Homobonus would remain until the morning Mass. On November 13, 1197, Homobonus died. Fourteen months later Homobonus was canonized by Pope Innocent III. In the bull of Homobonus's canonization Pope Innocent III called him "father of the poor", "consoler of the afflicted", "assiduous in constant prayer", "man of peace and peacemaker", "a man good in name and deed", "this saint, is still like a tree planted by streams of water that yields its fruit in our time."

== Veneration ==
Omobono Tucenghi is the patron saint of Cremona, and the protector of merchants, textile workers and tailors. His body is preserved in a crypt of the cathedral of Cremona.

In 1592, the Cremona Cathedral was dedicated to him and to St Mary’s Assumption. In 1643, the City Council chose him as patron of the city. Bishop Nicolini of Cremona dedicated to his memory the period between 13 November 1997 and 12 January 1999, calling it "The year of St Homobonus", to be celebrated with special spiritual, pastoral and cultural initiatives.

When the church of San Salvatore in Portico was given to the "Università dei Sarti" (the association of tailors) in 1575, the church was dedicated to their patron saint; Sant'Omobono in Rome is dedicated to him.

In Italy a comune is named after him (Sant'Omobono Terme). Saint Homobonus Hospital is located in Freetown, Sierra Leone.

== Sources ==
- Hallam, Elizabeth, ed. (1994). Saints: Who They Are and How They Help You. New York: Simon & Schuster. p. 66. ISBN 9780671882532.
- Prudlo, Donald S.; Voss, Paul J. (2025). Merchant Saint: The Church, the Market, and the First Lay Canonization. St. Augustine's Press. ISBN 1-58731-513-0.
