= Domestic & General =

Appliance protection company

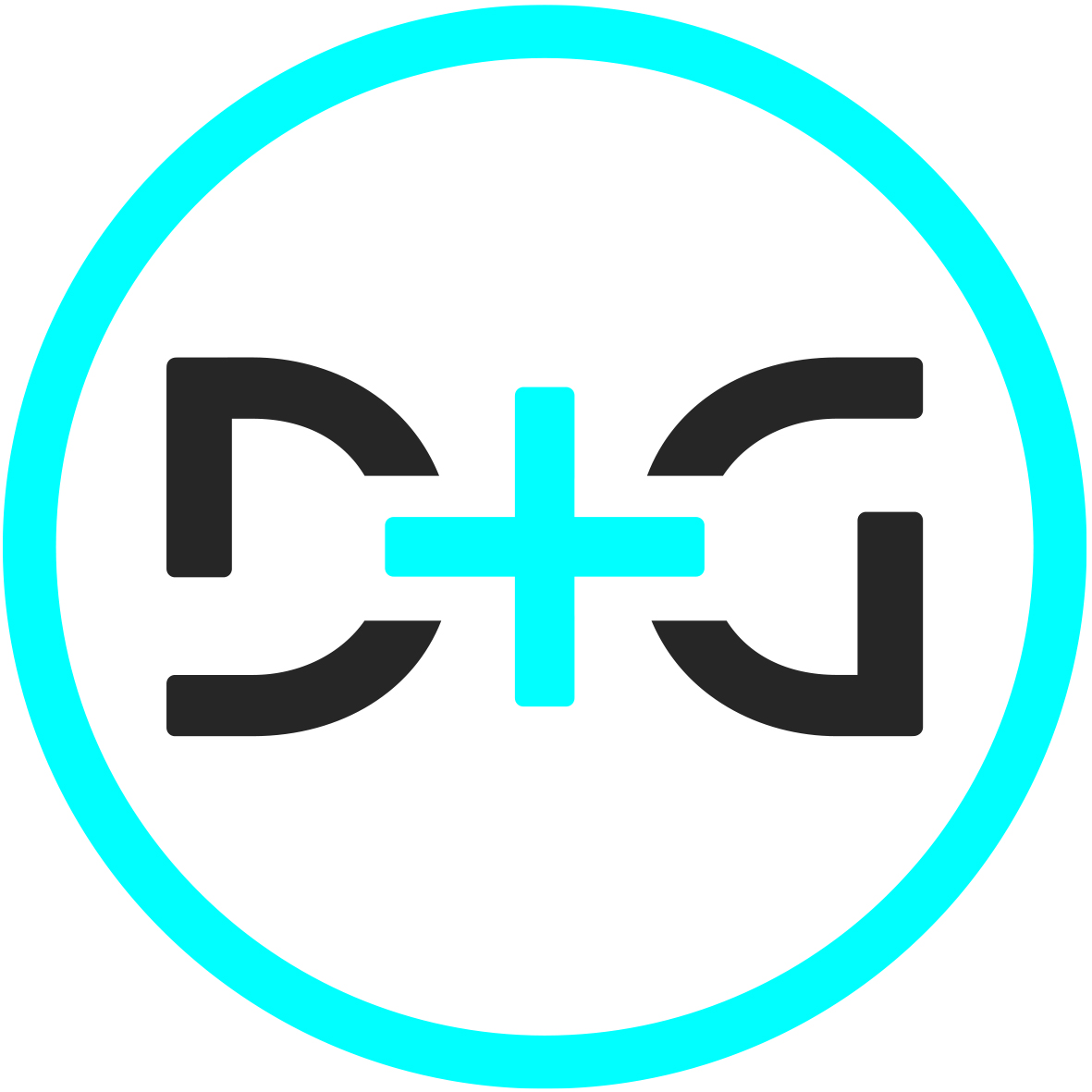
- Type: Subsidiary
- Traded as: LSE: DGG
- Industry: Insurance
- Founded: 1912
- Founder: Samuel Copley
- Headquarters: Wimbledon, England
- Area served: United Kingdom, United States and Europe
- Key people: Matthew Crummack
- Number of employees: 3,000 (2024)
- Website: www.domesticandgeneral.com

Domestic & General is a global insurance and appliance care provider, headquartered in Wimbledon, London and operates in the United Kingdom, United States, and Europe. It works with appliance manufacturers providing protection and repairs for household appliances.

== History ==
Domestic & General (D&G) was founded by Samuel Copley in 1859. Copley was involved in property development, cattle-raising and public transport. He was unable to find insurance for his cattle during transit on his return to Great Britain in 1912, so formed the Western Australian Insurance Company in July of that year.

The company originally covered all classes of risks, particularly fire, accident, livestock and marine insurance.

In November 2007, D&G became privately owned when it was bought by Advent International. In December 2013, the business was bought by CVC Capital Partners. The Abu Dhabi Investment Authority invested in the firm in 2019.

In 2021, Domestic & General launched in the United States acquiring After, Inc. and Nana technologies in the process.

== Offices and operations ==
Following the COVID-19 pandemic, D&G moved to a flexible working model.

Domestic & General was the Official Warranty Provider to the 2022 Commonwealth Games in Birmingham.

In 2023, Domestic & General opened a new office in Nottingham bringing £50 million of direct investment into the city. This was followed the next year by a new Brighton office for its 300 employees in the area.

Domestic & General sponsored Desirèe Henry at the 2024 Summer Olympics in Paris who won a silver medal in the 4×100 metres relay squad.
