= Sant'Omobono =

- San Salvatore in Portico
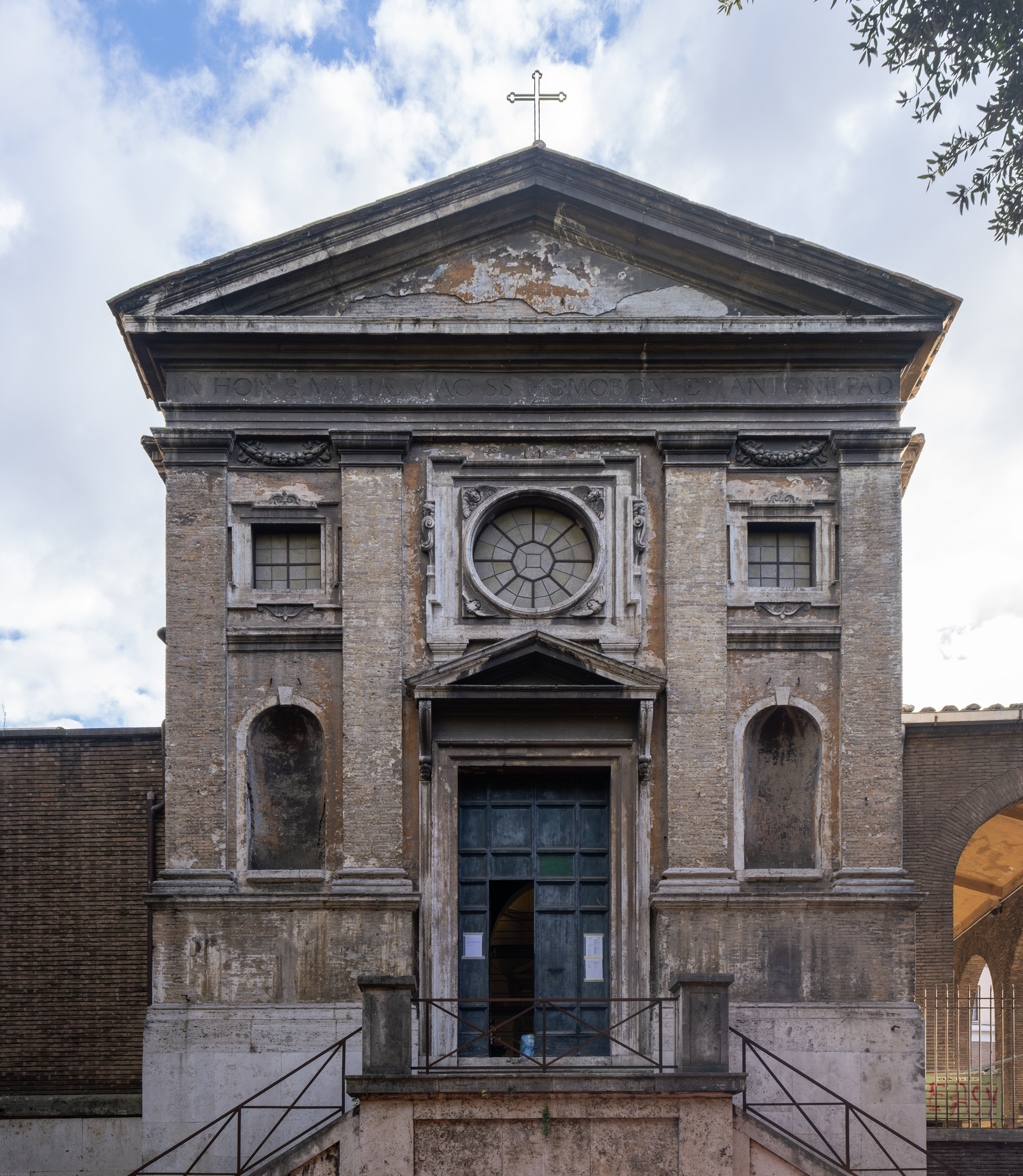
- Click on the map for a fullscreen view
- 41°53′26″N 12°28′51″E
- Location: Capitoline Hill, Rome
- Country: Italy
- Denomination: Roman Catholic

History
- Dedication: Saint Homobonus

Architecture
- Architectural type: Church

Sant'Omobono is a church in Rome at the foot of the Capitoline Hill in rione Ripa.

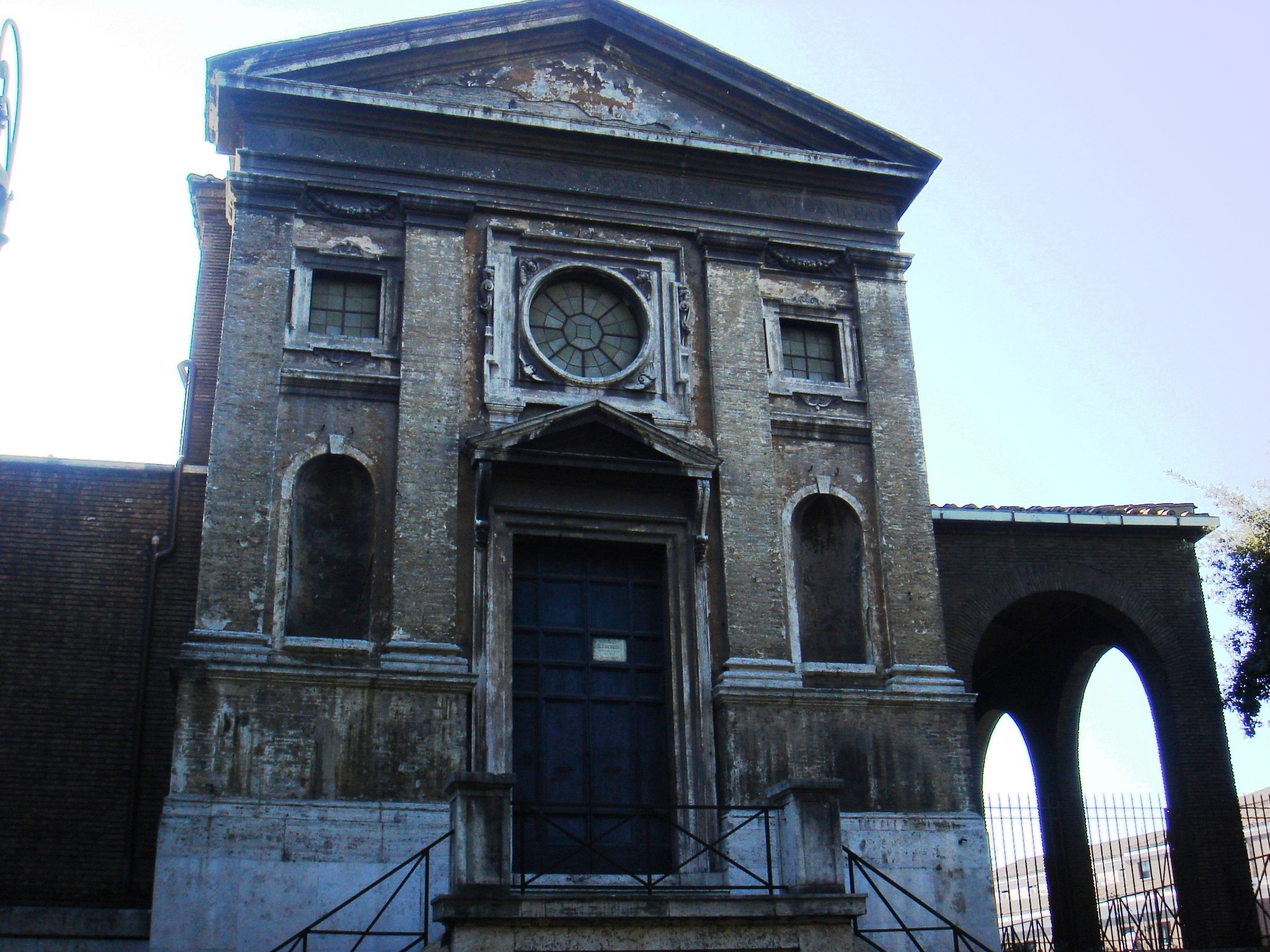
Sant'Omobono facade.

It was built in the 15th century and called San Salvatore in Portico. When the church was given to the "Università dei Sarti" (the association of tailors) in 1575, the church was dedicated to their patron saint, Saint Homobonus. Next to it is the Sant'Omobono Area, containing the remains of two Roman temples.
