= Sacerdos Fortunae Muliebris =

Ancient Roman priestess

Sacerdos Fortunae Muliebris was the title of the Priestess of the goddess Fortuna Muliebris in Ancient Rome.

The office was described by Livy, Dionysios of Halikarnassos and Plutarch. The temple of Fortuna Muliebris was established in Rome in 488 BC, after Marcius Coriolanus had threatened to invade, but had been persuaded not to by his mother and his wife. His mother and his wife hand in turn been persuaded to mediate by a delegation of married Roman women, matronae, under leadership of a matronae by the name Valeria. As a sign of gratitude, the married women were given permission by the Senate to found a temple dedicated to the Goddess Fortuna and to select the first priestess of the temple, which became Valeria.

The cult was celebrated by married women in Rome. It focused on female patriotism and engaged married women in the safety and success of Rome. The cult especially celebrated newly married women and women who had been married only once (univirae), and its priestess was likely to have been selected from among women of this category.
