= Sant'Omobono Area =

Sant'Omobono
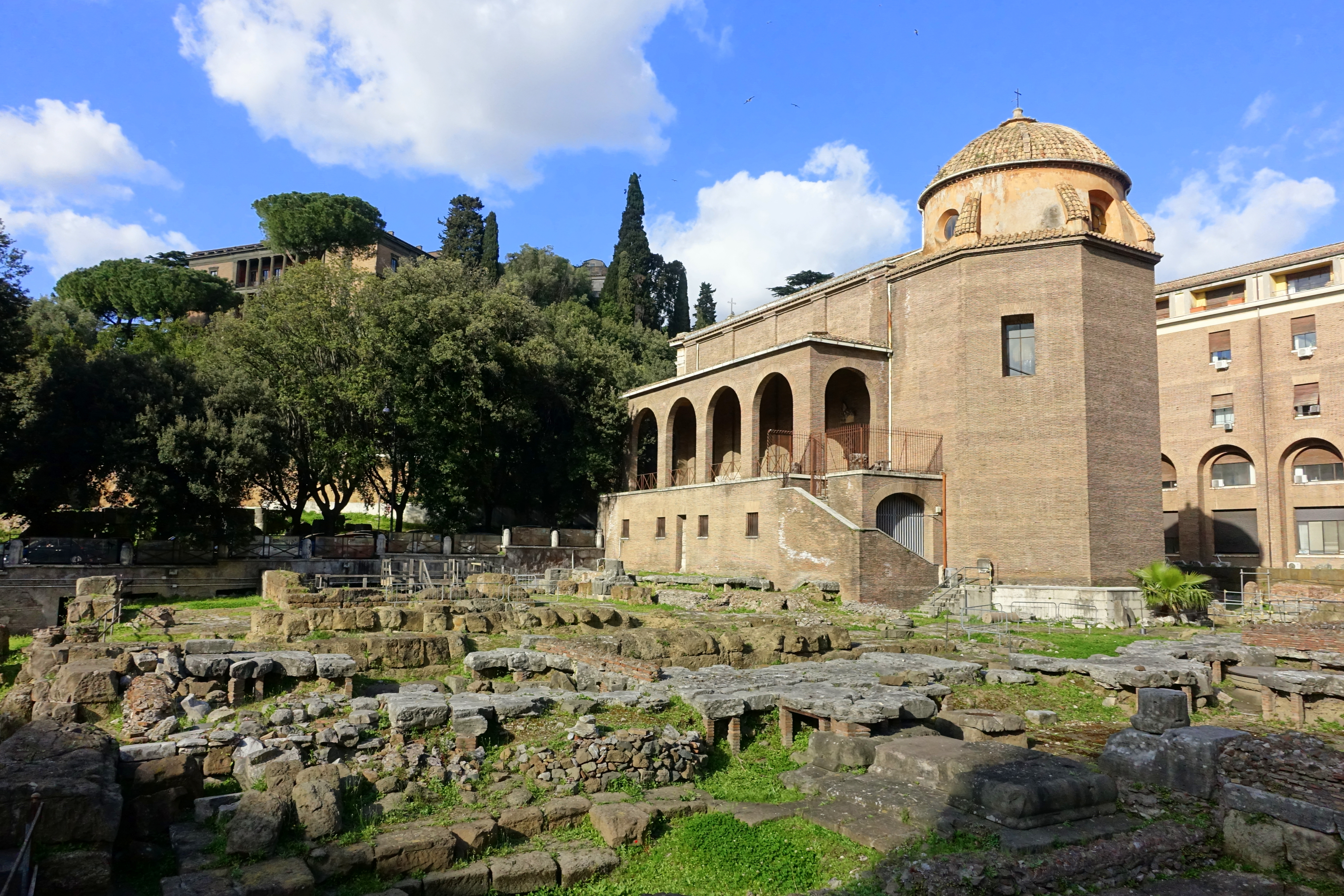
- Sant'Omobono Area

- Shown in ancient Rome
- Interactive map of Sant'Omobono
- 41°53′26″N 12°28′53″E

The Sant'Omobono Area (Italian: Area di Sant'Omobono or Area Sacra di Sant'Omobono) is an archaeological site in Rome located next to the church of Sant'Omobono, at the junction of via L. Petroselli and the Vico Jugario at the foot of the Campidoglio. It was discovered in 1937 and contains much important evidence for archaic and republican Rome. It contains altars and the sites of the temple of Fortuna and the temple of Mater Matuta. An earlier archaic-period temple underlies these two, dating itself to the early 6th century BCE, making it the oldest known temple remains in Rome.

The temples and their sanctuaries lie between the Forum Holitorium and the Forum Boarium. As of 2012, the archaeological site is under re-investigation by a joint team from the Sovraintendenza ai Beni Culturali of the Comune di Roma, the Università della Calabria, and the University of Michigan.

The site of Sant'Omobono is crucial for understanding the related processes of monumentalization, urbanization, and state formation in Rome in the late Archaic period.

== Bibliography ==
- Filippo Coarelli, Guida archeologica di Roma, Arnoldo Mondadori Editore, Verona 1984.
- Ranuccio Bianchi Bandinelli and Mario Torelli, L'arte dell'antichità classica, Etruria-Roma, Utet, Torino 1976.
