= Dried vine fruit =

Dried vine fruit is a term given to all the varieties of dried grape produced. The need for this term came from the fact that the United Kingdom is the only country in the European Union which differentiates dried vine fruit into different types. On mainland Europe, they are all simply called raisins, whereas in the UK they are differentiated into raisins, sultanas and currants. In this instance the term currant refers to the Zante currant, not the fruit of the Ribes genus.

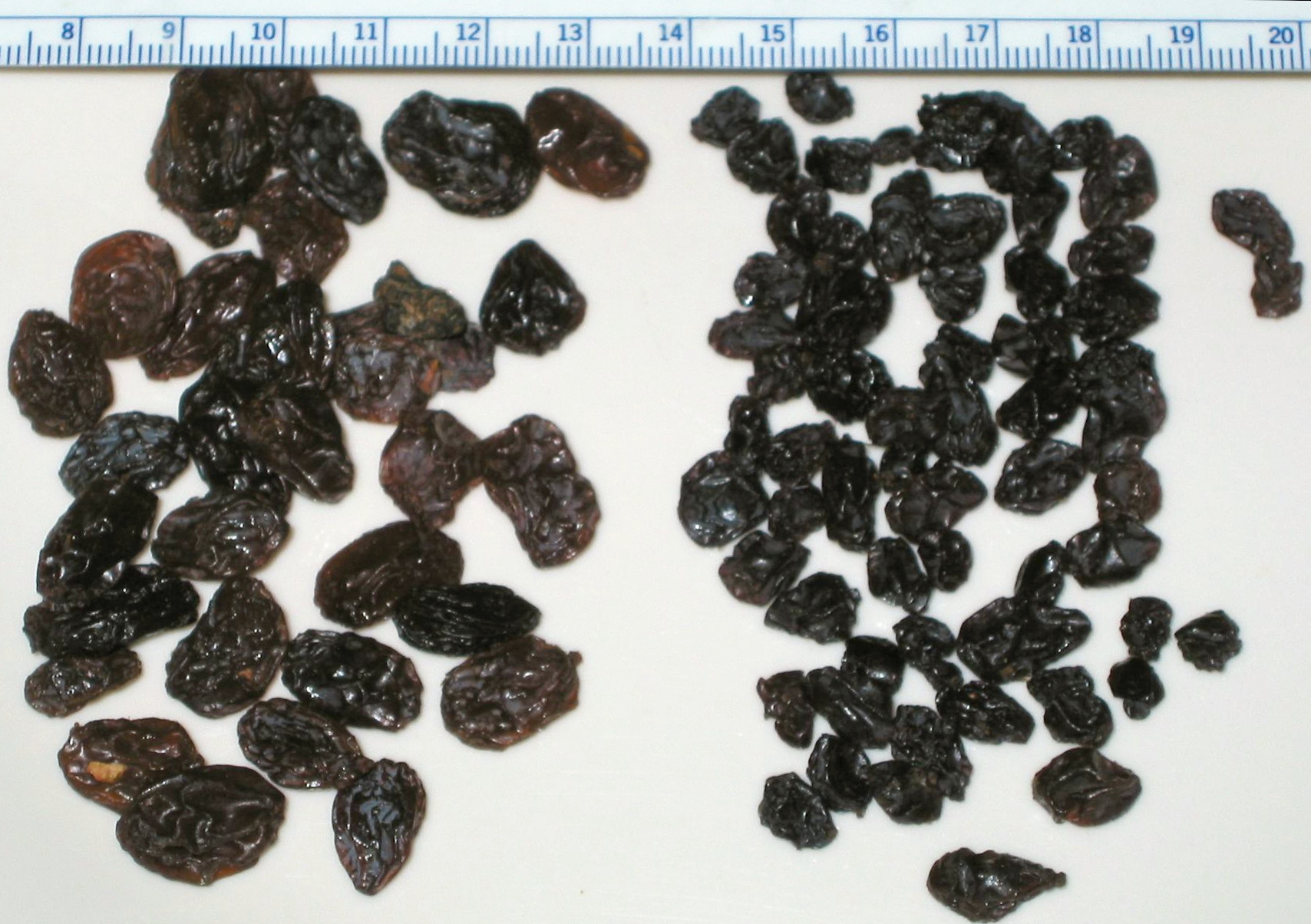
California Seedless Grape Raisins on the left and California Zante Currants on the right along with a metric ruler for scale.

The sultana was brought to Europe from the Ottoman Empire, and is known for its golden colour and delicate, sweet flavour.

"Golden raisins" are a Californian attempt to replicate the sultana industrially. They are made from the same variety (sultana=Thompson Seedless), treated with sulfur dioxide (SO_{2}), and flame dried to give them their characteristic colour.

A particular variety of seedless grape, the Black Corinth, is also sun dried to produce Zante currants, which are much smaller than other vine fruit, darker in colour and have a tart, tangy flavour.

Several varieties of raisins are produced in Asia and are only available at ethnic grocers. Green raisins are produced in Iran. Dried grapes in a variety of colors (green, black, white) and sizes are also produced in India.
