= Marica (mythology) =

Nymph in Roman mythology, mother of Latinus

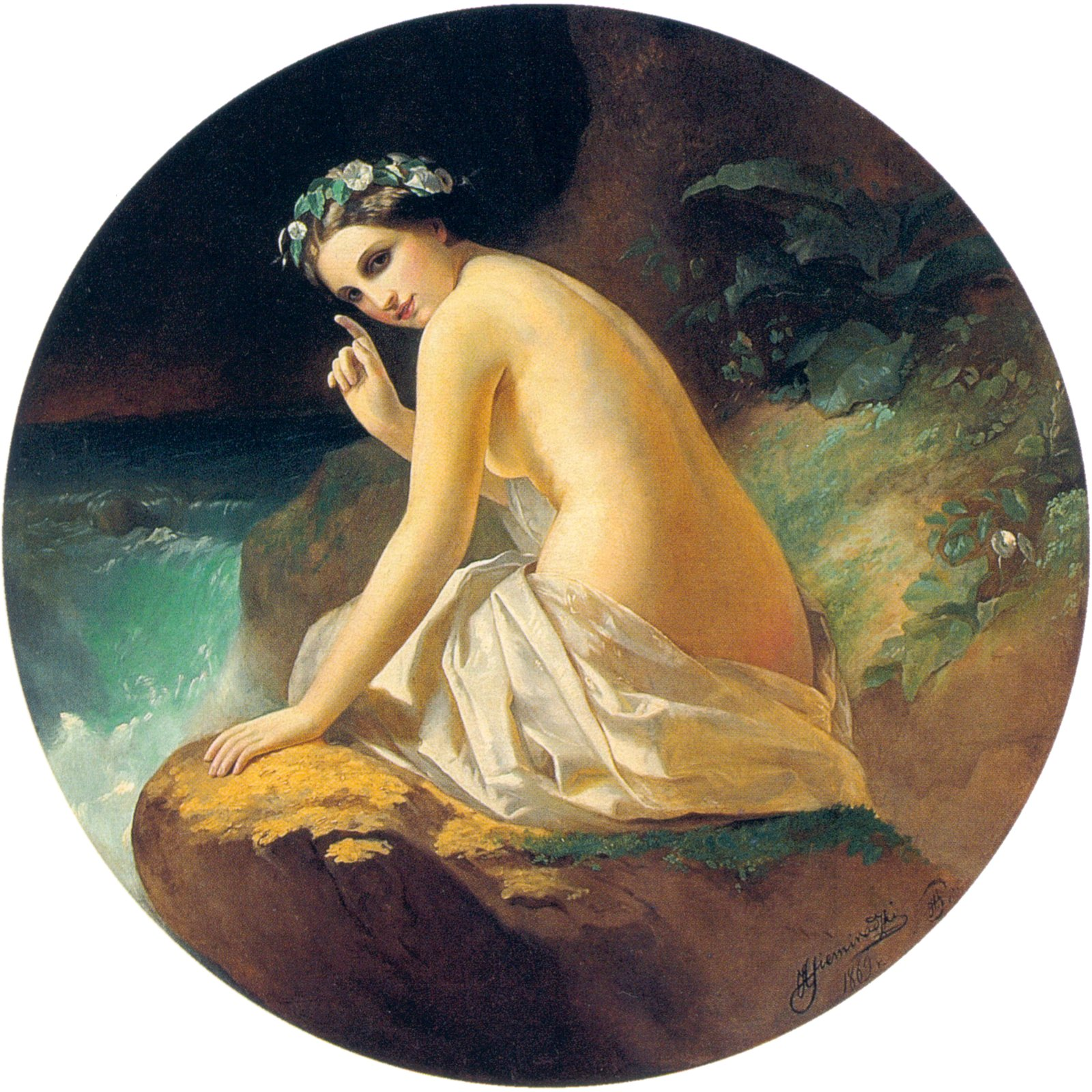
Marica, by Henryk Siemiradzki Lviv National Art Gallery, Ukraine

In Roman mythology, Marica was a nymph, the mother of Latinus. Latinus was fathered by Faunus, who was also occasionally referred to as the son of Marica. The sacred forest near Minturnae was dedicated to Marica. A lake nearby was also named after her. Various Roman authors claims that she was a form of Diana or Venus.

== See also ==
- Virgil, Aeneid, VII. 47.
- Livy, XXVII. 37, 2.
- Martial, X. 25.

== Bibliography ==
- Horace, Opera: The Works of Horace: the Odes on the Basis of Anthon: the Satires and Epistles by McCaul. Edited by George B. Wheeler (Dublin: Cumming & Ferguson, 1846)
- Martial, Selected Epigrams of Martial. Edited by Edwin Post (Boston: Ginn & Co., 1908)
- Purcell, N., Places: 432925 (Marica), Pleiades. Retrieved July 6, 2020.
- Rose, H. J., A Handbook of Greek Literature (London: Methuen & Co., Ltd., 1959)
- "Marica", William Smith (ed.), A New Classical Dictionary of Greek and Roman Biography, Mythology and Geography (New York: Harper & Bros., 1878)
