= Cati family =

Italian family associated with Lendinara, Ferrara and the House of Este

Cati Cati Cato; Cato (Cati); Catti; Catta; Catto; de Cattis
- Noble family
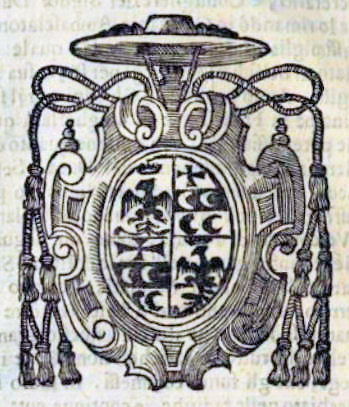
- Coat of arms associated with Giovanni Cati, from Antonio Libanori's Ferrara d'oro (1665)
- Country: Italy
- Current region: Lendinara, Ferrara, Polesine
- Origin: Lendinara
- Founded: Documented from the 14th century
- Titles: Count palatine; noble of Ferrara; knight
- Members: Catone de' Cati; Carlo Cati; Ludovico Cato; Renato Cato; Sigismondo Cato; Ercole Cato
- Traditions: Service to the House of Este
- The family is recorded principally as Cati, Cato and Cato (Cati). Forms such as Catti, Catta, Catto and de Cattis also occur in northern Italian archival and heraldic sources, although they do not necessarily identify the same genealogical line.

The Cati family, also known as Cato or Cato (Cati), was an Italian family originating in Lendinara and active in Ferrara, Padua and the Polesine. The Ferrarese branch is the best documented and included sixteenth-century jurists, diplomats, administrators and men of letters connected with the House of Este.

The principal documented members of the Ferrarese line belonged to the legal and diplomatic world of the sixteenth century. Ludovico Cato, his sons Renato, Sigismondo and Ercole, and their descendants were active in university law, court service, diplomacy, translation, political writing and historiography. Older literary historiography also grouped Ludovico, Renato and Sigismondo among the jurists associated with the reputation of the University of Ferrara.

The spelling of the name varies. The Dizionario Biografico degli Italiani uses the form Cato (Cati) for Ludovico, Renato and Ercole, and notarial and genealogical material from the Polesine, Bologna, Ravenna, Venice and other Italian contexts records forms including Catti, Catta, Catto and de Cattis.

== Cati/Cato of Lendinara and Ferrara ==
The earliest documented members of the family appear in the historical orbit of Lendinara, Ferrara and the House of Este. An early figure was Catone de' Cati of Lendinara, son of Benvenuto, a furrier. Sources state that he moved to Ferrara to practise as a notary; the first act bearing his signature is dated 1308. Emanuele Carletti describes him as a man of noble extraction who served the Este marquises of Ferrara as notary and chancellor, and later material associates him with the service of Aldobrandino II d'Este.

In 1320 Catone acquired land for an oratory dedicated to the Virgin Mary, later granted to the Servites. In his testament of 1358 he made economic and spiritual bequests to the same religious community and requested burial in their church.

An inventory of the Archivio di Stato di Modena, within the Archivio Segreto Estense, Cancelleria, Carteggio e documenti di particolari, records a file under the heading "Cati, Catti, Cato, Catto" in busta 337. The file contains fifteenth-century material under the names Ludovico, Baldassare, Bartolomeo, Battista, Gasparo and Leonello, and a parchment bifolio concerning Vincenzo and citizenship of the city of Lugo in 1581.

In the fifteenth century the family name is again documented in the educational and legal environment of Ferrara. Giorgio de' Cati of Lendinara appears in Giuseppe Pardi's study of the University of Ferrara as a student in 1466–1467, licensed in December 1470 and awarded doctoral insignia on 27 September 1471.

At the beginning of the sixteenth century, Luigi Napoleone Cittadella records Rinaldo Cati as giudice d'Argine, or judge of the embankments, in relation to expenses for the oratory of the Madonna del Salice beyond the Po at Ferrara in 1505.

A further Ferrarese member, Carlo Cati, was a professor of medicine at the Studio of Ferrara, the historical university institution of the city.

The best-documented Ferrarese line emerged in the early sixteenth century with Ludovico Cato, known as Ludovico Cati. He was born in Ferrara in 1490, son of Renato, from an ancient family from Lendinara. He studied law at Bologna and Ferrara and received his doctorate in utroque iure at Ferrara on 7 August 1516. He later became procuratore fiscale, reader of civil law at the University of Ferrara, and diplomat in the service of Alfonso I d'Este.

Ludovico served in diplomatic missions connected with the papal, imperial, Spanish and French courts. In 1522 Alfonso I sent him to Spain to pay homage to the newly elected Pope Adrian VI. Ludovico found the pope at Zaragoza and, on 2 June 1522, delivered a public oration on behalf of the duke of Ferrara. The speech was printed at Zaragoza and reprinted at Ferrara in the same year.

After following Adrian VI toward Italy, Ludovico arrived in Rome on 31 August 1522 and remained there as resident orator until March 1524. His Roman mission was directed toward the restoration and confirmation of Este rights after the conflicts with Julius II and Leo X, including questions concerning Nonantola, San Felice, the Este Romagna, Reggio and Modena.

During his Roman residence, Ludovico also appears as a contemporary witness to the artistic and courtly culture of papal Rome. A letter written from Rome to Alfonso I d'Este on 2 September 1523 reported that Pope Adrian VI had displayed in the Sistine Chapel the hangings made for Pope Leo X after designs by Raphael, describing them as an exceptional spectacle for human eyes. In another letter, dated 14 March 1524, Ludovico described a gathering at Villa Madama, then still incomplete, mentioning its fountains, sculptures, gardens and distinguished guests, including Paolo Giovio and Baldassarre Castiglione. The two letters document aspects of Ludovico's diplomatic residence in Rome and his observations on courtly and artistic life there.

At Granada on 30 September, he concluded the projected betrothal of Ercole d'Este to Margaret of Austria, although the marriage did not take place. He remained in Spain until the autumn of 1527.

Emperor Charles V made Ludovico a knight and count palatine. Ludovico and his descendants were associated in later sources with imperial privileges and with the use of the imperial eagle in the family arms, although the chronology of these honours is not uniform in the later tradition.

In 1529, Ludovico was sent as ambassador to the court of Francis I of France. His task was to protect the duke of Ferrara during the negotiations that led to the Treaty of Cambrai, but the clause safeguarding the duke's position was not included in the treaty. Ludovico remained in France until the summer of 1530.

In 1534, he returned to France to announce the death of Alfonso I and the succession of Ercole II, and in 1539 he addressed the doge and the Venetian Senate during a Ferrarese legation. This Venetian oration is recorded by EDIT16 as a printed work dated to around 1539, concerning the question of precedence between the legates of the duke of Ferrara and those of the duke of Florence. An inventory of the Archivio Segreto Estense records a Venetian diplomatic file for Ludovico Cati, consisting of five dispatches and five ducal minutes dated between 22 April and 2 May 1545.

Ludovico was also active in juristic controversy. After visiting Andrea Alciato at Bourges in 1530, he published at Ferrara in 1533 a respectful but critical admonition concerning Alciato's interpretation of the law of the five-foot prescription. The two jurists later taught together at Ferrara between 1542 and 1546.

In 1543, Ludovico's interpretation of the first law of the title De edendo in the Justinianic Code was challenged at Ferrara by the jurist Mario Arca of Narni. The dispute concerned whether a defendant could be compelled to produce an extract of accounts, especially in matters involving deposits and banking relations. Pietro Aldobrandini, a devoted pupil of Ludovico, defended his interpretation in a letter directed against Arca. Treccani records that the dispute attracted attention in Ferrarese legal circles.

Ludovico married Ippolita Nigrisoli and the couple had four sons, three of whom were Renato and Sigismondo, who became jurists, and Ercole, who became a man of letters. A near-contemporary biography of Ludovico, written by Bonaventura Angeli, was printed in Ferrara in 1554 under the title Vita di Lodovico Cati giurisconsulto ferrarese.

Renato served the Este court as ducal secretary, secret councillor and diplomat. He was sent on missions to Rome, Vienna and the imperial court. In 1570 he became resident orator at the imperial court, where he was involved in the Este struggle for precedence against the Medici and in the recognition of ducal titles such as "altezza" and "serenissimo". A study of diplomacy and musical patronage by Franco Piperno cites letters sent in January 1571 from Prague by Renato Cato and Alessandro Fieschi, Ferrarese ambassadors at the imperial court, to Alfonso II d'Este, in connection with the Virginia Vagnoli affair and secret consultations between Pesaro and Ferrara.

Sigismondo Cato belonged to the same generation. A manuscript attributed to him, entitled Viaggi et negotii da me Sigismondo Cato fatti et trattati dopo che servo questa Serenissima Casa, records travels and negotiations undertaken in the service of the Este house. The manuscript concerns events from 1568 to 1604 and refers to service under Cardinal Luigi d'Este, Duke Alfonso, Duke Cesare, Prince Alfonso and the Infanta.

Sigismondo is less treated in modern biographical reference works than Ludovico, Renato and Ercole, but the manuscript tradition places him in the same Este diplomatic and courtly environment. Older Ferrarese literary historiography also placed him among the learned jurists of the family. The surviving manuscript concerning Sigismondo's travels and negotiations provides direct evidence of his service to the Este house.

Sigismondo is also recorded as a jurist and as a counsellor connected with the diplomatic activity of Cardinal Ippolito d'Este, including diplomatic travel to France and the Republic of Siena.

Ercole Cato, also known as Ercole Cati, was a son of Ludovico Cato and Ippolita Nigrisoli. In 1563 he entered the service of Cardinal Ippolito II d'Este as secretary and lived with him between Rome, Tivoli and Ferrara. After the cardinal's death in 1572, Ercole delivered his funeral oration.

Ercole was active as a writer, translator and political agent. He translated works by Charles Estienne, Henri Estienne, Louis Le Roy, Jean Bodin and Justus Lipsius, reflecting the literary and political culture of the late Este court.

Ercole's attachment to Lendinara also emerged in local historiographical controversy. In 1584 he published, under the pseudonym Zago di Santa Rentua, an Apologia sopra l'Historia del sig. Andrea Nizolio, directed against Andrea Nizolio's history of Rovigo and written in defence of Lendinara. The work reflects Ercole's association with Lendinara and the local historical controversies of the Polesine.

After the death of Alfonso II d'Este, Cesare d'Este sent Ercole, together with his brother Renato, to Venice to seek support against papal claims over Ferrara. After Ferrara passed to the Papal States, Ercole accepted the new papal government while maintaining good relations with the Este court. In 1604 he was appointed noble councillor of the city of Ferrara.

Ercole is also important as the author of the family memoir studied by Angela Ghinato. Through this work, the Cati preserved a narrative of their family history, social identity and service between Lendinara, Ferrara and Padua.

Crollalanza describes Ercole as a knight created by the Venetian doge Sebastiano Venier and as one of the founders of the Accademia degli Intrepidi.

Ercole Cato was connected with the literary circle of Torquato Tasso. In 1581 he took part in a poetic exchange with Tasso: Tasso replied to a sonnet by Ercole Cato with the sonnet Quella che nome aver di dea non merta, accompanied by an interpretation and commentary. The exchange is documented in modern Tasso scholarship and in bibliographical records of the 1585 Ferrarese edition of Tasso's Rime e prose, which include sonnets by Ercole Cato and replies by Tasso.

Ercole also moved within the Venetian editorial world of Aldo Manuzio the Younger. The second part of Tasso's Rime included a dedication by Aldo Manuzio to Ercole Cati, dated 7 October 1581.

As a translator, Ercole Cato produced Italian versions of French political and didactic works and of texts associated with neo-Stoic thought. His Italian translation of Louis Le Roy's work on the vicissitude of things was published in Venice in 1585 and later reissued, while his translation of Jean Bodin's Démonomanie des sorciers was published by Aldo Manuzio in 1587. The Italian Demonomania de gli stregoni is the first Italian translation of Bodin's work; subsequent Venetian editions were altered by ecclesiastical censorship, and the work was prohibited for both reading and possession.

His Italian version of Justus Lipsius's Politicorum libri sex, studied in modern scholarship, was published in Venice in 1618 by his son Ludovico under the title Della politica, ouero, Del gouerno di stato libri sei. A related manuscript, Discorsi, annotationi et esempi del Cav. Hercole Cato ferrarese sopra i sei libri della Politica di Giusto Lipsi, dating to around 1601, is preserved in the Biblioteca Apostolica Vaticana as Vat. lat. 9918.

The Bibliothèque municipale de Lyon describes Ercole Cati as a man of letters and court, a friend of Tasso and a translator of Bodin and Le Roy.

Giovanni Cati is listed among the titular archbishops of Sebastea in 1520. A coat of arms associated with him appears in Antonio Libanori's Ferrara d'oro, published in 1665.

Crollalanza also names Giovanni as bishop of Sebastea in his entry on the Cati of Ferrara.

== Family memoir and historiography ==
The principal modern study devoted to the family is Angela Ghinato's essay La «domestica historia» della famiglia Cati, published in Memoria di Adriano. Studi in onore del maestro Franceschini (1920–2005) nel centenario della nascita by the Deputazione provinciale ferrarese di storia patria.

Ghinato examines a manuscript written by Ercole Cati as a family memoir. The work was intended to preserve the history and identity of the Cati and belongs to the broader tradition of family memories produced in late medieval and Renaissance Italy.

The manuscript reconstructs the family's history from its earlier origins to Ercole's own lifetime and was later continued by other members of the family. In this narrative, the Cati appear as a family from Lendinara, later active between Ferrara and Padua, with roles in administration, law, letters and arms.

The memoir also preserves an early modern claim of descent from Marcus Porcius Cato. This claim is best understood as part of the family's Renaissance self-representation rather than as a verified ancient genealogy.

The existence of Ercole Cati's family memoir is also noted by Marco Folin in his study of chronicles in Ferrara and the Este states. Folin lists the work begun by Ercole Cati in 1580 and continued by later family members among the historical writings produced in the Este context.

== Further documentation ==
Inventories of the Archivio Segreto Estense contain evidence of archival material relating to bearers of the Cati/Cato name and related forms. The Carteggio e documenti di particolari inventory records busta 337 under the combined heading "Cati, Catti, Cato, Catto", with one parchment and fifteenth-century material associated with the names Ludovico, Baldassare, Bartolomeo, Battista, Gasparo and Leonello, along with a 1581 act of citizenship of Lugo concerning Vincenzo.

The Carteggio ambasciatori. Venezia inventory records Ludovico Cati's 1545 Venetian diplomatic file, consisting of dispatches and ducal minutes.

== Nobility ==
Pope Clement VIII enrolled the family of Renato Cati among the noble houses of the perpetual council after the devolution of Ferrara to the Papal States. This account belongs to the nineteenth-century heraldic tradition and is distinct from the modern biographical and historiographical studies of the family.

The later heraldic tradition is not uniform on the chronology of the imperial honours. The family's privileges are associated with Emperor Charles V, while other sources distinguish between privileges and the use of the imperial eagle granted under Charles V and the title of count palatine granted under Maximilian II in 1573. Heraldic repertories derived from Rietstap attribute arms to the Cati counts of Ferrara.

A coat of arms associated with Giovanni Cati is reproduced from Antonio Libanori's Ferrara d'oro, published in 1665. This image should be understood as an attested historical coat of arms associated with a Cati bearer, rather than as a complete reconstruction of all branches.

In a separate adjacent entry, Crollalanza discusses the Catta or Catti name in relation to branches associated with Orbetello, Ravenna and Venice. He gives distinct arms for these branches. For the Catta of Orbetello and Rome, he records arms divided per fess: in the first, Or, an eagle Sable langued Gules; in the second, Azure, a dog passant Argent collared Gules, with a dovetailed bordure Argent and Azure.

For the Catta of Ravenna, Crollalanza records arms divided per fess Sable and Argent, with a chief Or supported by a fillet Gules and charged with two martlets Argent and a double-headed eagle displayed Sable, beaked Or.

== Wider Cati, Catti, Catta and Catto documentary field ==
Early modern notarial records from the Polesine include several Cati notaries, including related spellings such as Catti, Cati and de Cattis. In 1529, the Council of Rovigo recognized the notary Giovan Francesco de Catti as entitled to preserve and draw up in public form documents of other notaries, including Lorenzo and Francesco Catti and his father Giovanni.

The same documentary context includes Giovanni Domenico Catti, Hettor Catti, Dominico Catti and Zuanne Cati, son of the late Giovan Francesco Cati.

Francesco Schröder's nineteenth-century repertory of noble families confirmed in the Venetian provinces includes both Catti and Catto (Catti) among the family names listed in its alphabetical index.

Giovan Battista di Crollalanza records a family named Catta or Catti of Orbetello, Ravenna and Venice. The family originated from Lendinara, where it was enrolled in the noble council and the patriciate. Crollalanza states that in 1339 a Catta was described as notary and grand chancellor at the court of Obizzo d'Este, lord of Ferrara.

The family later divided into several branches and settled in different Italian cities, including Ravenna, Venice, Rome and Marciana. Crollalanza gives distinct arms for the Catta of Orbetello and Rome, the Catta of Ravenna and the Catta of Venice.

=== Learned and courtly bearers of the Catti name ===
A notable literary bearer of the Catti form was Bernardino Lidio Catti of Ravenna, also known as Lidio Catti. He was a poet and jurist from Ravenna, educated at Padua. His Opuscula, a Latin and vernacular poetic collection dedicated to Leonardo Loredan, was printed in Venice by Giovanni Tacuino in 1502.

His work documents the use of the Catti form in learned circles connected with Ravenna, Padua and Venetian printing between the fifteenth and sixteenth centuries.

Another attested bearer was Vincenzo Catti of Vicenza. A Roman publication of 1582 concerning King Stephen Báthory of Poland records Vincentii Catti Vincentini Serenissimae Poloniae Reginae Physici, identifying him as a physician of the queen of Poland and as author of a Latin Carmen included in the volume.

=== Bologna and the Bolognese Apennines ===
The alphabetical index of notaries of the State Archive of Bologna records Giovanni Pellegrino Catti, or Cati, active between 1661 and 1681, with archival location 6/17 (5702). An archival inventory identifies him as Giovanni Pellegrino Catti/Cati di Prospero.

Later attestations of the name occur in the area of Verzuno and Ponte di Verzuno, in the municipality of Camugnano, in the Bolognese Apennines. Local historical material from the Camugnano area records that the villages of Vigaia and Capanne, known from medieval documents, were largely held by the Bertacci family from the fifteenth to the seventeenth century, and were later succeeded by the Cati and Bai families.

The name is also preserved in Mulino Cati, a mill at Ponte di Verzuno, in the municipality of Camugnano. The official tourist portal of the Bolognese Apennines describes the complex as having origins in the seventeenth century.

== Later bearers ==
Pasquale Cati (c. 1550 – c. 1620) was an Italian late Mannerist painter born in Jesi and active mainly in Rome. He was a member of the Accademia di San Luca in 1577, and his Roman activity is documented through works in churches and papal buildings, including San Lorenzo in Panisperna, the Vatican, the Quirinal Palace and Santa Maria in Trastevere.

Michele Catti (1855–1914) was a Sicilian landscape painter born in Palermo to Andrea Catti and Carmela Riotta. The Dizionario Biografico degli Italiani describes his artistic formation in Palermo, his brief apprenticeship with Francesco Lojacono, his stay in Rome with Francesco Paolo Michetti, and his later career as a painter of Sicilian landscapes and urban views.

Treccani notes that Michele's parents intended him for legal studies before he turned to painting.

== Modern surname distribution ==
The surname Cati remains rare in modern Italy. Surname-distribution data published by Cognomix place its largest present-day concentration in Emilia-Romagna, followed by Lazio, Tuscany, Apulia, Lombardy, Veneto and Piedmont.

The related forms Catti and Catto show different modern distributions. Cognomix places Catti mainly in Emilia-Romagna, Piedmont, Liguria, Lombardy and Sicily, while Catto is concentrated especially in Veneto, Piedmont, Lombardy, Liguria and Friuli-Venezia Giulia.

== See also ==
- Cati
- Cato
- House of Este
- Lendinara
- Ferrara
- Polesine
