= Kati (given name) =

Kati is a feminine given name, often a short form (hypocorism) of Katalin or other names.

== Given name ==
- Kati Agócs (born 1975), Canadian-American composer
- Kati Dagenais (born 1969), Canadian three-time world champion dog sled racer
- Kati Hiekkapelto (born 1970), Finnish novelist, performance artist and punk singer
- Kati Lázár (born 1948), Hungarian actress
- Kati Lehtonen (born 1975), Finnish former cross-country skier
- Kati Luoto (born 1972), Finnish strength athlete
- Kati Marton (born 1949), Hungarian-American author and journalist
- Kati Murutar (born 1967), Estonian writer, screenwriter and journalist
- Kati Piri (born 1979), Hungarian-born Dutch politician
- Kati Iina Rantsi (born 1996), Finnish rhythmic gymnast
- Kati Roloff, former member of Blutengel, a German electronic music group
- Kati Sundqvist (born 1975), Finnish cross-country skier
- Kati Tabin (born 1997), Canadian ice hockey player
- Kati Tolmoff (born 1983), Estonian badminton player
- Kati Wilhelm (born 1976), West German former biathlete
- Kati Winkler (born 1974), German former competitive ice dancer

== Nickname ==
- Katalin Berek (1930–2017), Hungarian actress
- Katalin Farkas (born 1970), Hungarian philosopher
- Kati Horna (1912–2000), Hungarian-born Mexican photojournalist, surrealist photographer and teacher
- Kati Jansen (born 1934), German retired freestyle swimmer
- Kati Kovács (born 1944), Hungarian pop-rock singer, performer, lyricist and actress
- Kati Kovalainen (born 1975), Finnish retired ice hockey player
- Kati Outinen (born 1961), Finnish actress
- Kati Tuipulotu (born 1967), Tongan former international rugby union player
- Kati Wolf (born 1974), Hungarian singer
- Kati Zsigóné (born 1953), Hungarian egg painter
