= Roman Catholic Diocese of Gabii =

The Diocese of Gabii or Diocese of Gabi (Latin: Dioecesis Gabinus) was a Roman Catholic diocese in the ancient city Gabii in the region of Latium, located due east of Rome along the Via Praenestina, which was in early times known as the Via Gabin. In 1060, it was suppressed to the Suburbicarian See of Palestrina. It was restored as a Titular Episcopal See in 1966. The current bishop is Paolo Ricciardi.

== See also ==
- Catholic Church in Italy
