= Anatomical votives in ancient Italy =

Clay anatomical votive leg

Anatomical votives are among the most common artifacts found in ancient Republican or Hellenistic archaeological sites across southern Etruria, Latium, and Campania, as well as neighboring regions. External body parts such as feet, hands, heads, phalluses, eyes, ears, and female breasts are all frequently depicted by votive offerings in Italy. Other body parts, such as the female genitalia, tongue, or fingers, are only rarely depicted. Unlike Greek anatomical votives, those of Central Italy also often portray internal body parts, of which wombs are the most common. Central Italy is also characterized by a type of 'polyviscera' votive, which showcases multiple internal organs as part of one structure.

== Production ==
=== Typology ===
==== Heads ====
===== Hellenic style =====
Votive head from the Art Institute of Chicago.

Two different styles of head, in particular, are known, one of which showcases clear Hellenic influence, while the other may be tentatively classified as 'indigenous.' The earliest Etruscan votive heads of this type were formed utilizing molds created via a patrix. Later types of heads were formed from molds themselves taken from the early heads, and thus the newer styles were smaller due to reductions in the size of the clay during the firing process. In particular, Late Archaic heads were mostly formed from molds imported from Attica, presumably through intermediaries in Southern Italy. To create these heads, the manufacturer would press slabs of clay into preexisting molds, and then—once the front and back halves were joined—they would fire the object.

One sample of this type, currently stored in the Art Institute of Chicago, is hollow and composed of pinkish-orange clay. The back of this votive is covered by a veil, itself topped by a diadem tied at the back of the head. Beneath the head-garments, lie numerous vertical strands of hair extending across the forehead. The hair and back of this head were covered in red paint, which would have rendered the object significantly bright in antiquity. Traces of paint have also been recovered on the pupil of the right eye. The surviving fragments of paint on both the face and the hair showcase a boundary line just before the diadem, implying that this ornament was left unpainted. This statue was also seemingly adorned with several different pieces of clothing. For one, the band at the bottom of the neck is likely indicative of a garment of some kind, but also, there are holes in the ears, probably for earrings. In terms of facial features, the slightly cleft chin projects downwards unevenly, extending down slightly further on the right side. The face has a long nose that also tilts to the right side. Moreover, both eyes are disproportionately large, albeit not equally, for the left eye is larger than the right. The eyes are also slightly convex, tilting downwards towards the nose. Stylistically, this votive head is reminiscent of the korai statues of Archaic Greek art, implying that the artifact dates to the 5th-century BCE.

Another example of an Archaic votive head, now stored in the Missouri Museum of Art and Archaeology, is composed of pink clay with additional pieces of mica and stone. The head is almost entirely solid, save for a small 7-centimetre (2.8 in) hole that extends upwards from the center of the base. Though both the Chicago and Missouri votives are Archaic, the Missouri head must have been composed at a slightly later date, for it contains a less pronounced Archaic smile, rounder eyes, a broader face, and a head tilted slightly to the right. The Missouri head lacks the diadem of the Chicago sample, and it has a hairstyle consisting of three rows of inward-turning curls. This Missouri head belongs to particular type of mold type found during a series of excavations in the Campetii area conducted between 1937-1938, with one particular example surfacing in Veii. This Veiian head is nearly identical to the Missouri votive, though it is slightly smaller, reaching 12.2 centimetres (4.8 in) in height, in contrast to the 13.7-centimetre (5.4 in) height of the Missouri head, perhaps indicating that the Missouri artifact belongs to an older series. In the case of this particular series of molds, the right ear of the prototype was damaged before firing, resulting in all votive heads of this type showcasing the same broken ear. According to the archaeologist Stephen Smithers, the Missouri type of votive head is stylistically comparable to the Propylaia Kore, an early Classical statue from the Acropolis Museum. Smithers notes that both share broad faces, depressions at the corners of their lips, and eyes with large lids. On this basis, Smithers concludes that that this particular model type is likely of Attic origin. Due to further similarities with a head of Athena from Olympia, itself dated to around 490 BCE, Smithers concludes that the Missouri votive ought to be dated to the between 490 and 475 BCE.

Later models of votive Etruscan and Roman heads are more so reflective of the Classical and Hellenistic styles of Greek art. One particular mold series, dated to the 3rd-century BCE, that was used to form votive male heads is characterized by a symmetric hairstyle consisting of thick curls that part at the apex of the face. The largest examples of this type of mold appear at Rome, where samples reaching 31 and 29 centimetres (12 and 11 in) in height have been found. On this basis, Smithers concludes that this style of mold most likely originated in Rome. However, the most intricately designed examples of this type of votive are a head, now stored Missouri Museum of Art and Archaeology, and another sample from Caere. The Missouri male votive is fashioned from red-orange clay containing particles of mica, and it is covered by a dark red-brown slip, unlike all the other heads of this mold type. Thus, Smithers suggests that a coroplast in Caere must have redesigned a preexisting model so as to render it more ornate. There is another head of this mold type, now stored in the Kelsey Museum at the University of Michigan, though it is thought to have been uncovered in Puteoli. This votive offering consists of a pink clay body including pieces of mica. However, unlike the Missouri head—which has a curved back similar to the human cranium and a large triangular vent hole—the Michigan votive has a flat back and a large circular hole. Since the Michigan model displays some of the detail found in the Missourian and Caerean heads, Smithers proposes that the mold might have reached the aforementioned coroplast via Puteoli. Collectively, all of these votives are stylistically similar to the sculptures of Hellenistic Greek artists such as Polykleitos, Praxiteles, Lysippos, Leochares.

====== Veil ======
Votive head from the Manchester Museum depicting a young man with short hair and no beard.

Many votive heads are depicted with veils, such as one sample currently stored in the Manchester Museum, which contains a flange extending over its sides, creating the appearance of a veil. For the sake of production efficiency, local artisans sometimes reused the same molds for veiled and unveiled variants. The veiled heads have been interpreted as a manifestation of Roman sacrificial customs, wherein the ceremony was performed with a veiled head ("capite velato"), while the unveiled heads are more in accordance with Greek custom. It is, however, not fully clear that the practice of veiled sacrifice is a specifically Roman rite, and the archaeologist Fay Glinister argues that evidence from Roman literature indicates that it was in fact a more generally Italic custom. Nevertheless, in accordance with the expected cultural differences should veiled sacrifice have been a Roman or Italic custom, sites in Latium such as Frascati and Ardea exclusively contain veiled heads, though some communities such as Satricum only mostly contain veiled heads. Likewise, in the Falisco-Capenate area, the majority of votive heads are veiled, such as at the site of Lucus Feroniae, where all of the votive heads—which date to the 2nd-century BCE—were veiled. The votive heads from Campania—an area that underwent significant Greek influence—also align with the supposed cultural variations regarding veiled sacrifice, for they are largely unveiled, though this is not a universal rule. Veiled votives appear in small numbers; of a sample of 500 Campanian heads dated from the 4th-2nd centuries BCE, just over 30 of them are veiled.

However, the Temple of Minerva Medica in Rome contains primarily unveiled votives—out of a sample of 42 votives dated from the 4th to the 2nd century BCE—only 4 (10%) are veiled. This information contradicts notion that veiled sacrifice was a defining feature of Roman or Latin religious ritual, though not the idea that veiled sacrifice was common. In fact, many other Italic sites contain mixtures of veiled and unveiled votives. For instance, at Trebula Mutuesca, a site in Sabinum, the earliest votive heads—all four of which date to the mid 4th-century BCE—were all veiled, whereas a set of younger votive heads—dating to the late 4th-early 3rd centuries BCE—consist of both veiled and unveiled forms. Similarly, at a sanctuary of Marica by Garigliano, both veiled and unveiled heads are attested, perhaps due to an effort by local craftsmen to appeal to customers of varying cultural backgrounds. The presence of unveiled votive heads even extends to Roman colonies, such as at Luceria and Carsioli. In the case of the latter, two separate votive deposits containing both unveiled and veiled heads have been discovered, one of which is located inside the settlement and another at a nearby sanctuary. At the latter of these sites, out of a sample of 228 votives dated, on the basis of their style, to the 5th-3rd centuries BCE, 144 (63%) votives were veiled, while 84 (37%) were unveiled.

Votive Roman female head.

In any case, on the basis of the supposed cultural distinctions between veiled and unveiled sacrifice, the spread of veiled heads throughout Italy has been interpreted as a sign of Romanization. In the Etruscan sanctuary at Campetti, out of the 22 votive heads dated to the 4th-century BCE, the majority—as in, 15 items—are unveiled, whereas 7 are veiled. However, by the 2nd-century BCE, most of the heads at the site became veiled. Similarly, in Tessennano, the majority of heads were produced following the conquest of the nearby city of Vulci in 280 BCE, and most of these heads are veiled. Nevertheless, 45 (26%) out of 174 offerings are unveiled, which the archaeologist Martin Söderlind has interpreted as part of an intentional effort by the local populace to resist Roman cultural influence. The veiled heads were manufactured by taking the unveiled variety and molding the veil by hand, which—according to Söderlind—is indicative of local craftsman attempting to modify their preexisting products to suit the needs of incoming colonists. However, Glinister causations that it is not truly possible to determine the ethnicity of the dedicators on the basis of the votives, only the particular rite within which a votive was used.

According to Glinister, it is more likely that the votives were varyingly rendered as veiled or unveiled according to whatever particular rituals were practiced at certain sanctuaries, some of which may have demanded veiled heads, while others did not. In support of his theory, Glinister notes that many other Etruscan sites do showcase mixed deposits including both veiled and unveiled heads. For instance, Veii already contained both styles of head before Roman occupation, as indicated by the discovery of archaic veiled female heads dating to the late 5th-early 4th centuries BCE. Other Etruscan sites retain unveiled votives in spite of colonization or close political contacts with Rome, such as Caere and Tarquinia. Caere, for instance, had been allied to Rome since the 4th-century BCE, fighting alongside the Romans in various wars. The sons of Roman nobles were even supposedly educated in Caere during the 4th-century BCE according to the 1st-century BCE Roman historian Livy. Nevertheless, at the Manganello sanctuary at Caere, only 2 (14%) of the 14 heads at the site were veiled. Likewise, at the Ara della Regina temple in Tarquinia, only 11 (5%) of the 234 votive heads are veiled, and no veiled heads have been found at the Porta Urbica sanctuary. New unveiled votives continued to be manufactured at Tarquinia during the 2nd-century BCE, and they remained commonplace up until the 1st-century BCE, when the practice of offering anatomical votives died out. Tarquinia itself was never colonized, and it was thus perhaps resistant to Roman cultural influences, though a nearby colony at Graviscae was established, and the city was only around 80 kilometres (50 mi) from Rome, which is—according to Glinister—a sufficiently short distance to permit cultural influence to gradually spread from Rome. The cults featuring veiled votive heads were perhaps primarily female, for—amongst a set of 5th-4th century BCE votive heads from Caere—5 out of 22 female heads were veiled, but only 1 out of 16 male heads.

===== Indigenous style =====
Etruscan bucchero face plaque

The indigenous style, known primarily known from Cavallari, consists of a heavily exaggerated head, with essentially no naturalistic features and a lack of fine details. Similar schematic faces are found in earlier Etruscan art, wherein they appear on bucchero face plaques, beakers depicting human faces, and Gorgon temple antefixes. Face beakers in particular disappeared approximately at the same time that anatomical votives came into use, and they returned to Etruscan material culture shortly after anatomical votives fell out of fashion. According to the archaeologist Kevin Dicus, it is therefore probable that the indigenous style of votives represents a continuation of the schematic face tradition, retaining the custom under a new form after the abandonment of face beakers. It is generally thought that—on these other artifacts—the representation of a face served an apotropaic function, and it may therefore be assumed that the schematic style was coopted for the anatomical votives, since they also were designed to protect the suppliant.

At Cavallari, all of the heads of this indigenous type are rounded so as to portray the cranium, though the heads can accomplish this rounding in various ways. On one head, the rounding is essentially confined to the apex of the skull, whereas on another head, the sides and back of the head are also curved. In any case, the cranium is separated from the face by a large, projecting brow. One example, the same one with the rounded apex, contains a large, elevated brow with sharp edges, thereby harshly dividing the brow from the face. However, the head with more generally rounded features, also has a brow that tapers off in size as it extends downwards toward the face, creating a smoother transition. Since the noses were joined to the head at the center of the brow, the differences in the construction of the brow necessitated slightly different treatments of the nose. On the aforementioned example of the sculpture with a small and smooth brow, the nose must gradually diminish in size as it nears the face so as to properly join itself to the head. In contrast, the brow with pinched edges extends outwards sufficiently far so as to allow the nose to connect without much alteration in size. To form the eyes, circular strands of clay were used to define the outline, inside of which were placed smaller circles to mark the pupils. Similarly, the mouth was indicated by a circular band of clay around the lower part of the face, from which an elevated portion of clay extended downwards, representing the chin.

The general shape of these abstract heads is reminiscent of a pot: The cranium is the base of the vessel, the face is the body of the pot, and the neck is equivalent to the neck of a pot. In fact, these objects were constructed in much the same way as a pot. First, they were fashioned utilizing a potter's wheel, and—on one sample from Cavallari—concentric striations permeate the inside of the head, likely left behind by the hands of whichever individual was spinning the clay. Afterwards, the artifact was turned upside-down, and the flat bottom of a pot—which was now the top—was rounded to form the cranium. Then, the artifact was left to dry until it was leather-hard, at which point the facial features were added in much the same way as one would add handles to a pot. Various different types of clay were used to manufacture the heads: Some were composed of Argilla rossastra—a darker, reddish clay with large inclusions used to create a coarser surface—while others were manufactured from Argilla rosata, a lighter pinkish-orange clay with fine-grain inclusions used to produce a smoother surface.

==== Feet ====
Clay-baked votive foot.

The vast majority of votive feet are constructed utilizing molds, and they are manufactured with extreme anatomical precision, leading many scholars to believe that real human feet must have been utilized as models. Not all feet, however, display the same attention to detail; some portray the feet in a more schematic style. Of these more abstract feet, some are manufactured with molds, but—at Grasceta dei Cavallari—there are also several examples of handmade votive feet. Many votive feet are depicted atop some platform, the function of which is unclear. The platforms are largely confined to molded votives—at Grasceta dei Cavallari, all three examples of the realistic votive feet are portrayed with platforms, while only two of the three molded schematic votives display this feature, though in their case the platform is only place beneath the elongated toes. However, none of the handmade votive feet are shown with platforms, although one sample does have a light groove at the bottom that may imitate this item. Likewise, out of a sample of forty-four handmade feet from eight other Italian sanctuaries, only three of which rest atop a platform. Of these three exceptions, two of them bear a light grove, while the remaining one has a platform similar to those of the schematic molded votives at Grasceta dei Cavallari.

Regarding the purpose of these platforms, it has been suggested that they may have functioned as footwear, though in many cases the stand were significantly larger than the outline of the foot and they thus do not appear to have served as the soles of shoes. The archaeologist Kevin D‘Arcy Dicus suggests that they were perhaps utilized to elevate the real-life model off the ground, and their presence happened to have been included in the final product. Dicus proposes that the platforms, in the case of the schematic molded votives, may have served to support the elongated feet, preventing them from breaking. This alternative theory is not necessarily incompatible with the notion that the platforms represented footwear, it only requires that any resemblance to shoes is merely a secondary function, while their primary role was to fulfill some practical objective in the creation of these terracotta models. In fact, some details appear to have been secondarily added onto the votive feet in order to artistically represent footgear: The platforms themselves were sometimes painted black, while red or black laces were occasionally painted onto the feet, and—in a few rare instances—model clay laces were placed on the object.

==== Hands ====
Votive hand offering

Clay-baked votive phallus

The majority of votive hands are usually depicted with open palms and the fingers spaced closely together, unfurled and extending outwards. In some cases, the forearms are included alongside the hands as part of one singular votive offering. Both right and left hands and arms were dedicated, though the incompleteness of the data regarding these artifacts preventing any further conclusions regarding handedness from being drawn. Unlike the votive feet, which are characterized by a high degree of anatomical realism, the only lifelike details present on a votive hand are usually a set of incisions for the lines of the hand and perhaps bulges beneath the fingers that represent musculature. There were two separate means of constructing votive hands, one of which involved the use of two molds, one for the back and one for palm, both of which were utilized to form the base structure of the hand, with the fingers being differentiated by horizontal grooves. The second technique required the fingers to have been crafted separately and then later attached to the hand. Because of this alternative method, many surviving votive hands are missing fingers at the point where they were supposed to be joined.

==== Phalli ====
Votive phalli are common throughout the Etrusco-Latial-Campanian area. They are usually mold-made and attached to rounded or triangular plaques, and almost all known examples are uncircumcised, with the foreskin extended over the glans. In some cases, phalli are found attached to other anatomical votives, such as those representing the torso. It has been argued that the votive phalluses might depict the condition phimosis, as they frequently depict the foreskin pulled over the glans. Though, if this were the case—the penises would be the only type of votive artifact consistently represented with a visible ailment and is unclear why they would be unique in this regard. Alternatively, Dicus argues that these votives may have instead represented a request for virility and fecundity, nothing that ancient medical authors, though recognizing phimosis as a genuine illness, did not necessarily consider view the phenomenon of the foreskin extending over the glans as an issue. In fact, the 1st-century CE medical encyclopedist Celsus describes a procedure wherein an incision is made into the foreskin so as to allow the skin to be pulled over the glans, all for the sake of aesthetic pleasure ("decoris causa;" "for the sake of beauty"). Furthermore, the phalluses frequently appear alongside other votives related to fertility or the reproductive process, such as breasts, uteri, placentae, and female genitalia. There are, however, other medical conditions that may possibly be identified on certain votive phalluses. For example, one votive from the Castellana Archaeological Museum showcases two bumps on the penis, one on the glans and the other on the lateral surface. These features may indicate the presence of penile hemangiomas or perhaps of genital warts.

==== Uteri ====
===== Varieties =====
Almond-shaped votive uterus from Tessennano with an appendage on the left

Votive uterus from Tessennano with a rounded shape and an appendage on the left

Votive uteri have been found in over 200 sites across Italy, primarily Lucania, Latium, Daunia, Tarquinia, and Campania. Over 1,300 of these votives have been found in Central Italy, and they are more common than in Greece. They are hollow objects, often with an opening at the neck of the uterus, though sometimes this space is instead marked by a series of concentric grooves or circles. At Vulci, out of a sample of 400 terracotta votives, 320 (80%) are closed, whereas 80 (20%) are open. Uteri of various different styles and from multiple different regions often have, on either side of their body, an appendage, itself consisting of a singular spherical or pointed protrusion of varying size. In some cases, the appendage is found on the central part of the womb, as on votives from Luceria. The majority of uteri are decorated with transverse lines running across their surface, though there are examples of wombs with smooth surfaces in sites such as Fontanile di Legnisina—which is by Vulci—and also in Ghiaccio Forte. Some votive wombs have a series of protuberances extending from the cervix all the way to the bottom of the artifact, and—on some examples from Vulci, Ghiaccio Forte, and Gravisca—these knobs are quite large, forming almost a crest.

Overall, Italian votive uteri have been classified into four types by the archaeologist Maria Fenelli: The almond-shape ("tipo di forma a mandorla"), ciabatta shape ("tipo di forma a ciabatta"), crested shape ("tipo crestato"), and a type with an elongated shape and cylindrical neck. The first of these varieties consists of a globular body with a cylindrical neck, the second of a convex bottom with a short and flat neck, and the third of a truncated base. The sanctuary site at Gravisca contains a hoard of almost 300 votive uteri, spread out across multiple distinct styles and shapes. Some are "almond-shaped" ("a mandorla"), while others are "pear-shaped" ("a pera"), and still more are "egg-shaped" ("ovoide"), with an additional type of "furrowed" ("scanalature") model also present at the site.

At the sanctuary of Fontanile di Legnisina, a set of about 300 votive uteri have been found, which are characterized by a series of widely spaced bands, cords, or straps. The archaeologist Laura Ricciardi has divided these samples into 48 types, themselves organized into three broad categories. Class I consists of 20 types, many of which were "egg-shaped," and all of which were positioned atop a pedestal or base or that stood by themselves, though the latter of these options was less frequent. Class II at Legnisina includes 27 types, and these votives were molded in high-relief on a flat base in such a manner that only either the upper or backside of the object were ever visible. Many category II votives were of the "almond-shaped" type. Class III consists of only one type of votive, of which only five examples survive, and these votives were molded in bas-relief.

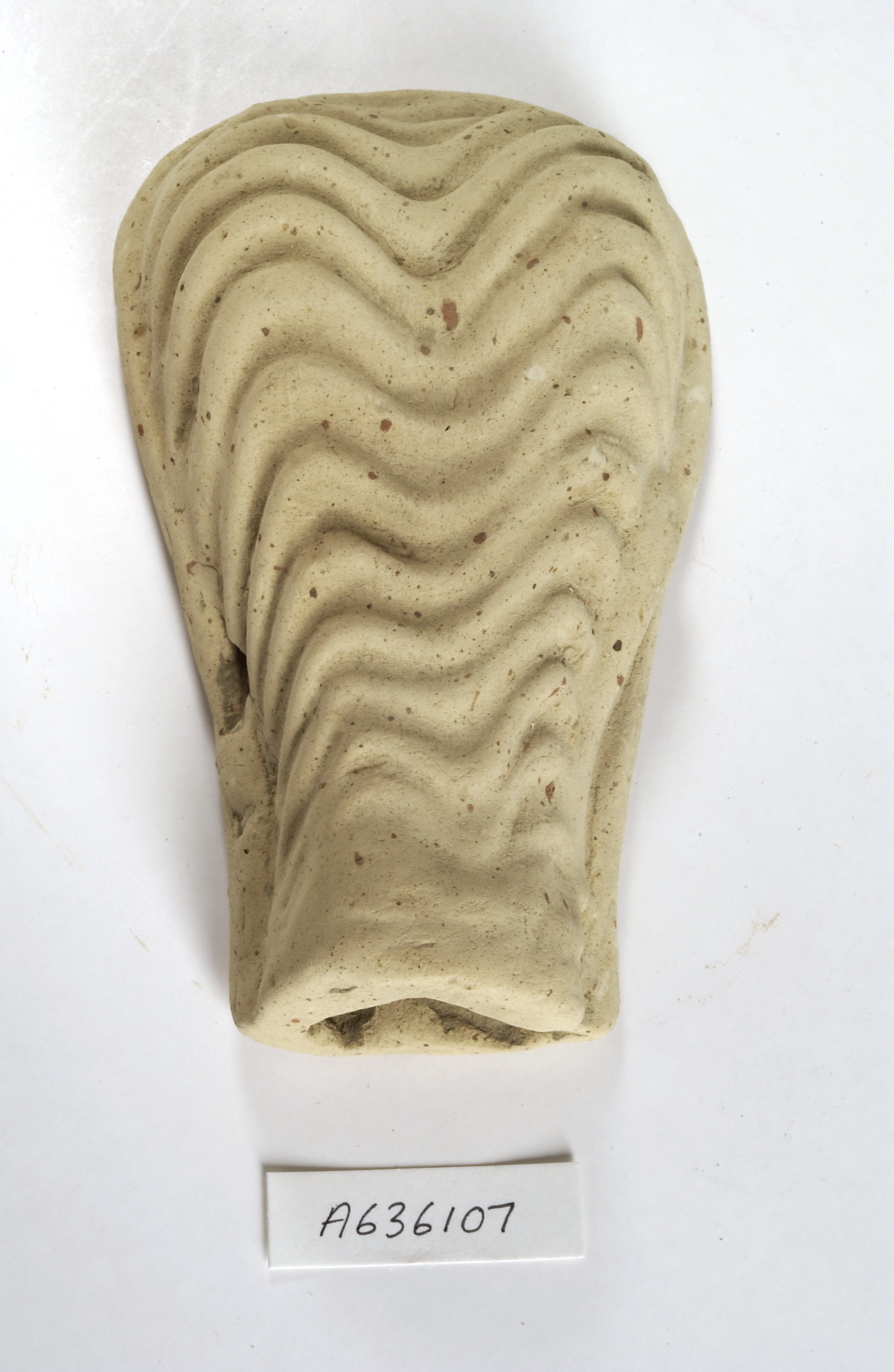
Uterus with waves of ridges

Uterus with an appendage

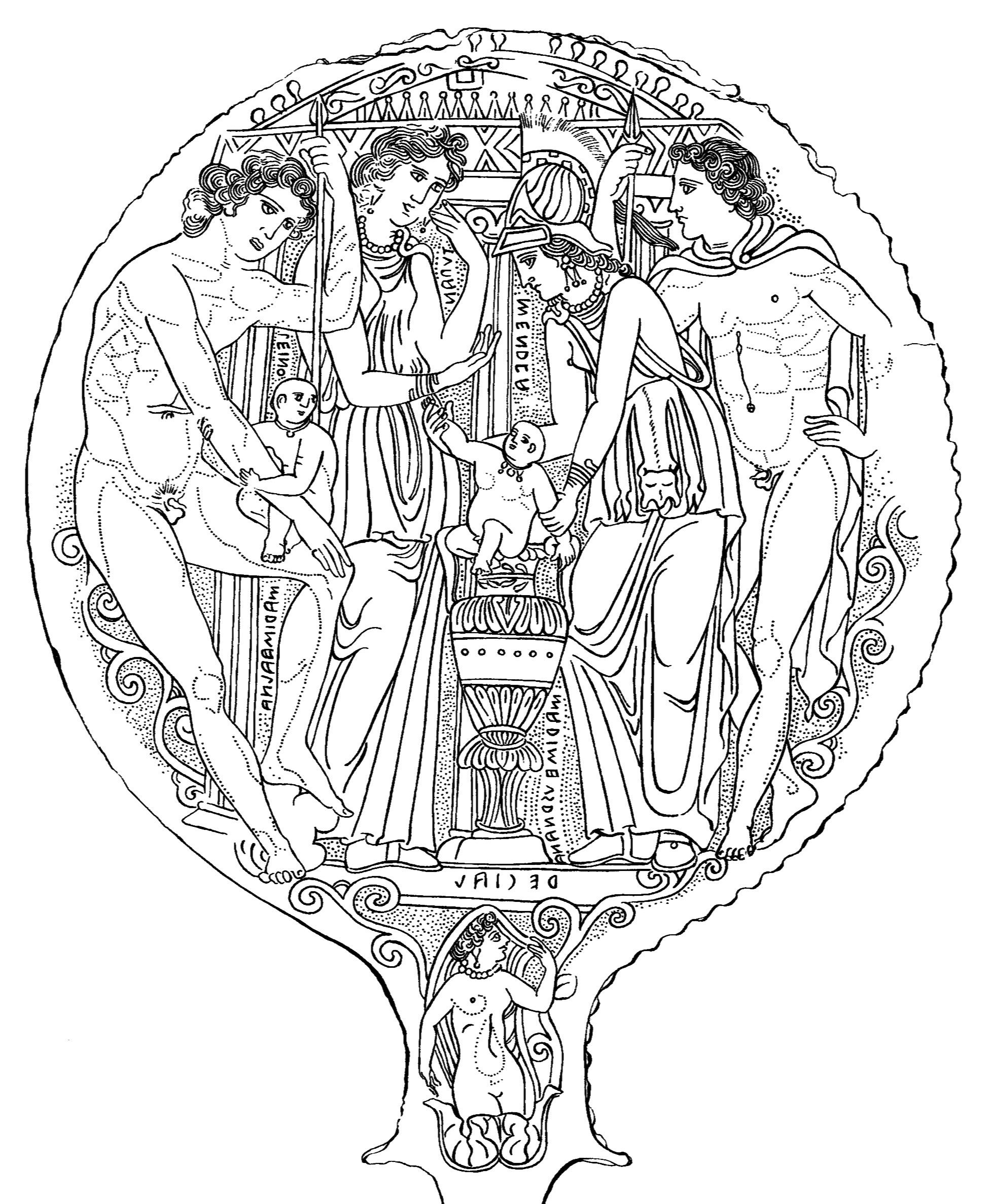
Bronze mirror from Chiusi showcasing the goddess Menrva holding a baby above a krater.

In Rome, a hoard of over 100 terracotta uteri has been found by the Tiber River. The votives from this collection can be subdivided into 11 types, though there are certain characteristics shared by all of them—they were all formed in high relief on a base, all of them have a series of transverse lines running across their surface, and all of them have an oversized mouth. In some cases, the base is pierced with holes or is curved on the backside. Variation amongst these votives also exists in regard to the size and shape of the ridges, main body, and the neck, as well as whether or not an accompanying organ is associated with the uterus. The same style of votive uteri marked by a series of ridges appears throughout other sites in Latium, such as in Nemi or Lavinium, as well as in Roman colonies, such as Fregellae, Paestum, and Luceria. Uteri of this type from outside of Rome, however, are typically less rounded, with narrower ridges and smaller appendages. Moreover, unlike Latium, where the ridges are usually straight, votive wombs from southern Etruria more frequently have wavy lines.

===== Interpretation =====
According to the archaeologist Rebecca Flemming, the bands on the Etruscan votives at Gravisca appear to form almost a type of harness. This harness would have, according to Flemming, served to keep the uterus in its proper place, itself possibly reflective of the emphasis placed upon the location of the uterus in Hippocratic medicine. The ridges have been interpreted as representations of the musculature on the uterine wall, on which basis it has been suggested that the votive may have been associated with women in labor. However, in contemporary Greek medical science—as described by Hippocrates—childbirth occurs when the fetus runs out of food in the womb and then seeks to break free so as to acquire more. According to Flemming, the mother is portrayed as ultimately passive in this endeavor; they merely suffer the requisite pain, but have no active part is giving birth. Thus, if these ridges did portray muscles, then the native Italic medical tradition would differ from that of Greece in this respect, though this is no other evidence supporting the existence of such divergent medical thought within ancient Italy regarding this matter. As an alternative, Flemming proposes that the ridges represent "a kind of potential plasticity" or "poised tension," one which is associated with the ability of the uterus to expand and contract. According to Flemming, should the ridges have indicated flexibility, their designs would fall more in line with what is known from the Hippocratic Corpus, wherein the expansion and contraction of the womb is emphasized.

According to the classicist Claire Bubb, the differing features of each aforementioned type of votive womb are explained by various phenomena affecting the bicornuate uteri of cattle, sheep, and goats. In bicornuate uteri, during a pregnancy, the horn containing the fetus expands greatly in size, while the other horn remains unchanged, creating a massive protuberance on only one side of the womb. Bubb proposes that the appendages found on votive uteri were likely modeled on this protuberance. Moreover, Bubb argues that the wavy ridges of certain votives serve to emphasize the contour of the dip in the surface of a bicornuate uterus wherein each horn contains a separate fetus. Under such a scenario, both horns of the uterus expand, creating two sizeable masses on both sides of the womb that each taper down towards each other, ultimately producing an inwards curve. Furthermore, the various knobs and bands of some wombs may instead represent the kind of bumps found on the bicornuate uteruses of animals that utilize cotyledonary placentation, such as sheep, goats, or cows. However, there are certain details of the anatomical votives that differ from animal bicornuate uteri, namely that they are all rounded at the top, whereas the animal uteri showcase curling tips. Ultimately, Bubb concludes that the votive uteri were likely based on scientific knowledge of both human and animal wombs. The practice of basing medical thought regarding humans on animal subjects was commonplace in antiquity, and the bipartite uteri of certain animals in particular greatly informed the Greco-Roman understanding of the womb. For instance, Pliny the Elder, a 1st-century CE Roman historian, writes that—in human women—the uterus has twin recesses, on either side of the flanks" ("in muliere geminos sinus ab utraque parte laterum habet").

The wombs are perhaps designed to emphasize the mouth of the uterus, and consequently its ability to entrap and contain semen. Within Hippocratic medicine, it was believed that the womb must not be either too soft or too hard, for it needed to initially remain sufficiently open in order to permit seed to enter, yet still firm enough so as to prevent the seed from falling out again. Afterwards, the womb needed to have a degree of stability in order to retain the seed for the duration of the pregnancy. The idea of the uterus as a container was common in the Greco-Roman world—the Latin word utriculus, for instance, means both "a small uterus" and also "a small leather bag." Imagery explicitly depicting this cultural association is found on two Etruscan mirrors, one from Chiusi and one from Bolsena, both of which showcase Maris held above vessels. Such a conceptualization of the uterus is perhaps reflected in the design of many of these votives, which resemble upside down vases. The votives sometimes contain one or two small clay spheres, which have been interpreted as representations of embryos. Alternatively, the archaeologists Véronique Dasen and Sandrine Ducaté‑Paarman suggests that they may instead reflect the "eagle-stones," a type of rock that was—in antiquity—believed to have connections to fertility. Another design feature, the perturbances found on certain wombs, appears to sometimes convey an animalistic quality unto the objects. In particular, according to Dasen and Ducaté‑Paarman, some designs are reminiscent of a fish, perhaps due to some metaphorical connection with the amniotic fluid. Portraying a human body part as some sort of animal would not be unique to these Italian votives, for many other ancient authors did the same. Plato, for example, refers to male genitalia as a "creature" ("ζῶον, zôon"), stating that the phallus is "disobedient and self-willed, like a creature that is deaf to reason, and it attempts to dominate all because of its frenzied lusts."

==== Breasts ====
The majority of such offerings are of one isolated breast, although pairs are not unknown. Individual breasts were typically mold-made, with some handmade examples occasionally surfacing. Structurally, they consisted of a hollow, hemispherical terracotta with one small ball of clay placed at the top so as to represent a nipple. The breast usually rests on some sort of base, itself formed in various ways—either through the use of a ring extending downwards around the perimeter of the breast, or through tapering at the bottom. In the sanctuary at Gravisca, some votive breasts are attached to plaques themselves pierced, as if they were to be hung from some other surface. However, these votives were most likely not actually attached to any wall, but instead—in accordance with Etruscan custom—placed near the sacred object, such as the altar or a cult statue. According to the archaeologist Alexandra Lesk, these piercings likely emerged in imitation of the style of Corinthian anatomical votives, from which the Italian tradition of anatomical votives likely emerged, and wherein votive breasts were, in fact, hung from walls. Other votive breasts at Gravisca that are attached to plaques only showcase one piercing, having therefore reducing the number of holes to only that which is necessary to prevent cracking during the firing process. Lesk proposes that these other votive breasts may represent a slightly later generation of the same item at Gravisca.

=== Material ===
The surviving anatomical votives are mostly mold-made, albeit usually with handmade bases and backs, and they are also generally life-sized, though with some examples smaller than the body part to which they corresponded. They are sometimes made from bronze, but mostly from terracotta, a cheap and durable material. The few known examples of bronze votive hands are primarily concentrated in the north of Italy. For example, only two votive hands have been uncovered in the Veneto and Cispadana regions, both of which were bronze. There is also some evidence for silver anatomical votives, in the form of two silver uteri that come from the Isideion on Delos, and were possibly of Italian origin. According to Flemming, the stylistic differences amongst the surviving anatomical votives are likely a small subset of the original, likely much more extensive, breadth of typological variation. Flemming suggests that there may have had anatomical votives composed of less durable materials, such as wax or precious metals. Anatomical votives could vary greatly in terms of the quality of their craftsmanship. For instance, according to the archaeologist Tim Potter, some samples at Ponte di Nona were "clumsily and crudely modelled," whereas other samples were much more ornately manufactured. Some anatomical votives are made from purified clay, and many contain additional ornamentation, such as handmade designs.

== History ==
=== Challenges for establishing a chronology ===
Tens of thousands of examples of such votives have been found, though relatively few of these discoveries have actually been published, and the data regarding these artifacts is therefore incomplete and often imprecise. For instance, archaeological reports often only mention that certain types of anatomical votives have been found at a given site, but they will frequently omit the actual quantity of the material. Moreover, many of these artifacts derive from poorly documented excavations or from looting, rendering their original archaeological context unclear. It is almost always impossible to date the votives utilizing stratigraphy, since the worshippers would gather up votives accumulated over decades or centuries, and then deposit them all at the same time. Though, anatomical votives usually appear at sites that themselves lasted from the 4th to the 1st centuries BCE. For instance, at Ponte di Nona, which yielded one of the largest and wealthiest hoards of anatomical votives, the evidence from pottery and coins indicates that the site was utilized from the 4th to the 1st centuries, and that it flourished during the 3rd and 2nd centuries BCE.

=== Origins ===
Anatomical votives most likely ultimately derive from Greece, where there already was a tradition of offering anatomical votives. Specifically, the Italian tradition probably derives from that of Corinth, for—unlike the rest of Greece—the Corinthian people fashioned their votives from terracotta. According to Lesk, anatomical votives may have arrived in Italy via ports in southern Etruria, such as Gravisca, which is known to have participated in extensive trade with Greek merchants. Heads were the first type of anatomical votive to appear in the archaeological record, first surfacing at the Campetti sanctuary in Veii. The archaeologist Annamaria Comella argues that the tradition of votives, after having emerged in Campetti, spread to Falerii, Carseoli, Capua, Teanum Sidicinum, and possibly to Caere. According to Flemming, the heads—by portraying a particularly important piece of the body—may have, at first, metonymically represented the entire person, and they only later acquired the role of representing specifically the head. Afterwards, the idea of utilizing representation of specific body parts as votives may have further spread.

=== Spreading across Italy ===
From the region surrounding Rome, this type of artifact spread in popularity, spreading across the Etrusco-Latial-Campanian region, and the Apennine area, in the 4th-century BCE. The spread of these artifacts across Italy coincides with Roman expansionism. In fact, Comella proposed that the spread of anatomical votives across the Tyrrhenian area is probably to be attributed to the Roman conquest of Veii in 396 BCE. On this basis, earlier scholars suggested that these votives are probably a direct connection between Roman expansionism and the spread of anatomical terracottas, and, in fact—outside of Latium and southern Etruria—they appear most frequently at sites with Roman colonies, such as Luceria and Paestum. However, Glinister argues that the correlation between Roman influence and anatomical votives is illusory, only generated by a greater amount of archaeological research conducted on Etruria, Latium, and Magna Graecia, which has naturally yielded more finds from these regions. Moreover, all of the earliest known anatomical votives are found in areas of Latium and Etruria outside of Rome, and the early Etruscan terracottas all predate Roman colonization. Thus, the dispersion of these artifacts across the Etrusco-Latial-Campanian area cannot be attributed to Romanization. The same is true in the Apennines, where anatomical votives were also present prior to Roman occupation. For example, the earliest known terracotta votives at Carseoli may date to the mid 4th-century BCE, but the area was only turned into a Roman colony in 298 BCE.

Nevertheless, the building of Roman road networks helped connect the Apennine communities with those of the Tyrrhenian coast, which may have in turn facilitated the dispersal of religious practices across these areas. Yet, anatomical votives are found at numerous sites that are not known to have been colonized by the Romans, such as the sanctuaries at Monte Acuto, Monte Subasio, Bettona, Pasticcetto di Magione, San Giovanni in Galdo, Campochiaro, and Gildone. In fact, sanctuaries such as those at Rapino, Campomarino, Petacciato and Fonte San Nicola—which all located far away from Roman colonies—reveal large numbers of anatomical votives. Conversely, anatomical votives are not found at sites close to Roman colonies. For instance, the Samnite sanctuaries of Pietrabbondante and Campochiaro were only 20 and 27 kilometres (12 and 17 mi) away from the Roman colony of Aesernia, and yet only one clay head and foot have been recovered from Pietrabbondante, whereas Campochiaro has yielded zero anatomical votives.

There is perhaps evidence that Roman colonization may have brought the tradition of anatomical votives to Paestum, where large quantities of terracotta uteruses were found that were manufactured utilizing molds that were also in use at Rome. These artifacts were found within the Italic temple, which itself was seemingly constructed after Roman colonization in 273 BCE. Thus, it has been proposed that Roman and Latin colonists may have introduced anatomical terracottas to the site. However, the archaeologist Rafael Scopacasa notes that epigraphic evidence confirms the presence of Italians at Paestum prior to Roman conquest, which—according to Scopacasa—allows for the possibility that anatomical votives were not brought to Paestum by Latin colonists, but instead by cultural contact with the Tyrrhenian region.

At other sites, Roman colonization did not necessarily prompt the locals to abandon their preexisting customs regarding anatomical votives. For example, the sanctuaries at Carseoli and Luceria reveal low numbers of fertility-related votives, in accordance with the customs of the Apennine region and in opposition to those of Latium. Carseoli is unique in that it contains large numbers of votive eyes and digestive organs, whereas other Apennine sites contain none, though Tyrrhenian sanctuaries—such as those at Tarquinia or Veii—do contain such items. These discrepancies can be interpreted as the result of Roman colonization, though—given the aforementioned evidence for the lack of influence of Latin colonists at this site—Scopacasa instead proposes that this regional variation emerged due to a complicated series of networks interlinking disparate areas across Italy and the Mediterranean, rather one singular type of culture imposed by Roman colonists.

=== Disappearance ===
The eventual disappearance of these items from the archaeological record in Italy has been explained as the result of an incipient medical practice sparked by the arrival of both Greek doctors and the healing god Asclepius to Rome. However, Flemming argues that the Romans otherwise continued to propitiate deities for healing purposes even past the growth of the medical profession, and also the tradition of anatomical votives persisted in Roman Gaul and Greece. Even with the existence of practicing doctors, they were still rare and only available to upper-class individuals, and—according to Glinister—contemporary medical science was not sufficiently advanced or successful enough to justify the cessation of religious consultation for health issues. Another theory, first advanced by the archaeologist Patrizio Pensabene, is that the rise of the Latifundia and the concurrent decline of the rural Italian peasantry caused the decline of anatomical votives. However, the premise of this theory—that there was such a significant decline in the rural Italian poor—is itself not uncontroversial, and this theory also relies upon the assumption that the dedicators were lower class, which was not necessarily always true. Alternatively, Flemming proposes that the decline in anatomical votives was a result of both the shift to written votives around the same time, as well as the decline in rural sanctuaries, which would have made it harder for countryside people to access sites wherein they could deposit such votives.

== Religious role ==
Clay-baked votive eyes

Votive terracottas found in the Tyrrhenian region or Daunia

=== Function ===
Functionally, they likely served medicinal purposes, invoking divine aid for the particular body part they depicted. Thus, eye-shaped anatomical votives were probably associated with problems concerning vision, uteri were likely connected with anxieties regarding pregnancy or conception, and feet were presumably related to mobility issues. However, it is not clear exactly how they might have benefited the dedicator—perhaps they were offered with the aim of healing some ailment, or ensuring the continued health of the suppliant, or maybe to grant some boon. The vast majority of votive objects lack any clear signs of illness, and—in fact—votive heads in particular showcase idealized visages in line with contemporary Italic standards of beauty.

In any case, there are still some surviving votives seem to showcase signs of particular medical afflictions, though the vast majority lack any clear depiction of pathological conditions. X-ray analysis of over 400 terracotta uteri from Vulci revealed that they contained small clay spheres, usually with a diameter of about 1 centimetre (0.39 in). These objects may represent an embryo, and—since some uteri contain two spheres—twins may even be depicted. Some spheres are marked by small protrusions, which could theoretically symbolize a variety of different medical conditions, such a tumor, cyst, or ectopic pregnancy. Even when the votives do not explicitly portray a medical illness, information regarding their function can be gleaned from the specific parts of the body they do chose to depict. Eyes at Ponte di Nona sometimes consist of exclusively the eyeball, while other times they are portrayed with the eyelids and the periocular tissue. Thus, the votives may have varyingly dealt with conditions that exclusively impacted the eyeball, such as myopia or cataracts, and others that affected both the eyeball and the eyelids, such as conjunctivitis.

Types of votives found in the Apennine region

It is also possible that these artifacts served for metaphorical purposes. For instance, votive feet perhaps represented physical movement, with Glinister suggesting that they may have symbolized "pilgrims, pilgrimages, or secular journeys." These artifacts are found in contexts specifically associated with travel in Samnium, where they appear deposited on the roadside at transhumance routes. Votive eyes may have request for some sort of awareness or enlightenment, or perhaps a desire to be seen by a deity. Ears may have likewise communicated a wish to be heard by a divinity, and hands perhaps represented a prayer or the power of a god. Votive heads perhaps—at least in some circumstances—served as representations of the entire body, rather than specifically the head of the suppliant, and they therefore potentially were not even strictly anatomical in the same way as the other votive body parts. Ultimately, the wide range of possible utilities for these artifacts was probably a major factor in their popularity—ancient peoples could utilize them to suit a variety of needs.

There existed regional variation between the differing practices regarding anatomical votives, some of which are attributable to long-standing cultural differences between the Apennine and Tyrrhenian areas. In the Apennine area, votives pertaining to the upper or lower limbs, such as hands, feet, arms, and legs, are common, whereas anatomical votives depicting reproductive organs are relatively rare. The situation is mostly the exact opposite in the Etrusco-Latial-Campanian area, where votives relating to reproduction were more common, and votives relating to the limbs were comparatively infrequent. Still, these patterns are not unanimous; there are sites in the Tyrrhenian area that do contain large quantities of anatomical limbs, such as Lavinium or the temple of Minerva Medica in Rome. According to Scopacasa, the preferences for anatomical votives depicting the limbs in the Apennine area is probably a continuation of preexisting cultural ideas. The Apennine region was, prior to the 4th-century BCE, already characterized by figurines—mostly of bronze—depicting hands, feet, and legs, as well as a lack of votives related to female fertility. Anatomical votives pertaining to hands and arms are also found in Greece, being among the most numerous votives found in the Asclepieion in Corinth. It is possible that the peoples of the Apennine region shared similar cultural concerns with those of Greece, as they were both mountainous regions, potentially cultivating in both areas the same anxieties regarding travel.

=== Association with sanctuaries ===
Votive assemblages of various Apennine sanctuaries

Suppliants either buried their anatomical votives in ditches or trenches outside of sanctuaries, or laid against the sanctuary's walls, altar, or cult statue base. At certain sanctuaries, once the number of anatomical terracottas had grown so large as to take up too much space, the votives were gathered together and thrown in a ditch specially dug to store excess votives. The exact divinities to which these artifacts were dedicated are, most of the time, unknown, though—at some sites—the names of certain gods or inscribed upon the votive, or the sanctuary itself is otherwise attributable to a particular deity. Some of the gods known to have received these dedications include Diana, Minerva, Hercules, Apollo, Ceres, Selvans, Mars, Mater Matuta, Vei/Demeter, Uni/Hera, and Turan/Aphrodite.

The majority of deities known to have been offered anatomical votives were female and concerned with fertility, such as Uni, Mater Matuta, Diana, and Ceres. At Gravisca, one room—known to have been dedicated to Juno—contains 222 uteri, while another sate dedicated to Minerva at Lavinium contains almost exclusively breasts, uteri, and swaddled infant votives. However, deities of either sex could receive offerings of anatomical votives, with male gods sometimes even receiving offerings of breasts or female genitalia. The dedicators of female genitalia were probably themselves female, and likewise votives depicting male genitalia were presumably mostly offered by men. There is, however, little explicit evidence confirming the gender of the suppliants, though two votive wombs from Fontanile di Legnisina do record a female worshipper offering the items to the goddess Vei. Other votive items—as in, those not depicting genitalia—were probably gender neutral, and therefore capable of being offered by both men and women.

Other sites, however, largely lack anatomical votives related to fertility, such as Ponte di Nona, which is located about 16.09 kilometres (10.00 mi) north of Rome. According to the archaeologist Steven M. Oberhelman, it is likely that suppliants traveled to other sanctuaries to earn divine aid any maladies afflicting their reproductive organs. Specifically, Oberhelman suggests the site of Campetti in Veii, which is also about 16.09 kilometres (10.00 mi) north of Rome and has large numbers of votive sex organs. Ponte di Nona does, however, contain thousands of votive hands, arms, feet, and hands have been discovered, and—given that it is a rural sanctuary—the site would have been frequented by farmers and other laborers, who would have been prone to injuries afflicting such limbs. Similarly, other rural Italian sanctuaries also yield large numbers of limbs, such as those at Fregellae, Nemi, and the Tredici Altari sanctuary at Lavinium. The last of these sanctuaries, the site at Lavinium, may have specialized in limbs, for only a few examples of other body parts—such as breasts or ears—have been found, and no samples of eyes or internal organs have been discovered in this area.

Some sanctuaries have large quantities of anatomical votives with significant stylistic variation amongst them. For instance, archaeological work at Ponte di Nona during the 1970s uncovered 8,395 votives, of which only 6,171 (74%) were identifiable, and—of this sample—5,931 (96.11%) were anatomical. Most of anatomical votives at the site—exactly 2,368 (38%) in fact—depicted feet, with the second largest group of votives, numbering precisely 985 (16%), depicted heads. At other sites, however, anatomical votives appear in much smaller numbers, are outnumbered by other artifacts, and exclusively consist of the more generic styles, such as the representations of heads and feet. The former type of site is much more clearly connected to healing, and Flemming even suggests that it could be considered a "healing sanctuary," though other activities were certainly performed in these areas and medical practices may not have even been their primary purpose.

According to Scopacasa, the overall votive assemblages of sites containing anatomical terracottas vary greatly. For example, Scopacasa cites the sanctuaries at Pietrabbondante and Campochiaro, both of which contain votive offerings of iron and bronze weapons, and yet only the former actually contains anatomical votives. Furthermore, Scopacasa cites the sanctuary at Rapino, where large quantities of broken pottery have also been found, implying some association between the site and banqueting and drinking rituals. However, no other known sanctuaries with anatomical votives display the same connection with dining. On this basis, Scopacasa concludes that the sites containing anatomical votives must have housed multiple different types of cults and cannot be classified as exclusively "healing" sanctuaries, though they may still have had some medical connotations.

=== Dedicants ===
Many of these artifacts were clearly inexpensive to produce, and they were therefore likely accessible to a broad swathe of the population, not just the elite. Moreover, they are widespread across Central Italian sites, appearing at numerous different sanctuaries of varying functions. Some sites containing anatomical votives, such as Tessennano and Nemi, are located in the countryside, whereas others, such as the Italic temple at Paestum, were located within cities. Anatomical votives are also found at sites such as the Campetti sanctuary, which is located just outside the walls of Veii. Due to the geographical diversity of the sites containing such votives, any ancient Italian individual would likely have had relatively easy access to an area where they could perform the associated rituals. Some archaeologists have argued that these votives were perhaps largely exclusive to the lower classes, as higher-status individuals would likely have sought to avoid dedicating the same cheap and low-quality votives that the poor could offer. However, Flemming argues that the existence of more lavish anatomical votives is perhaps evidence of specific commissions on the part of wealthier customers who desired more expensive offerings. Still, it is possible that the artifacts were primarily dedicated by the poor, which may explain why—despite their frequency in the archaeological record—they are almost entirely disregarded by contemporary elite literary sources. Glinister suggests that these artifacts were perhaps primarily dedicated by women, as the majority of the gods to which they are known to have been dedicated are female, and more female anatomical heads than male heads are known. However, it is not clear exactly what role women could have played in the varying cults so as to prompt any association with these artifacts.
