= Via Praenestina =

Ancient Roman road in central Italy

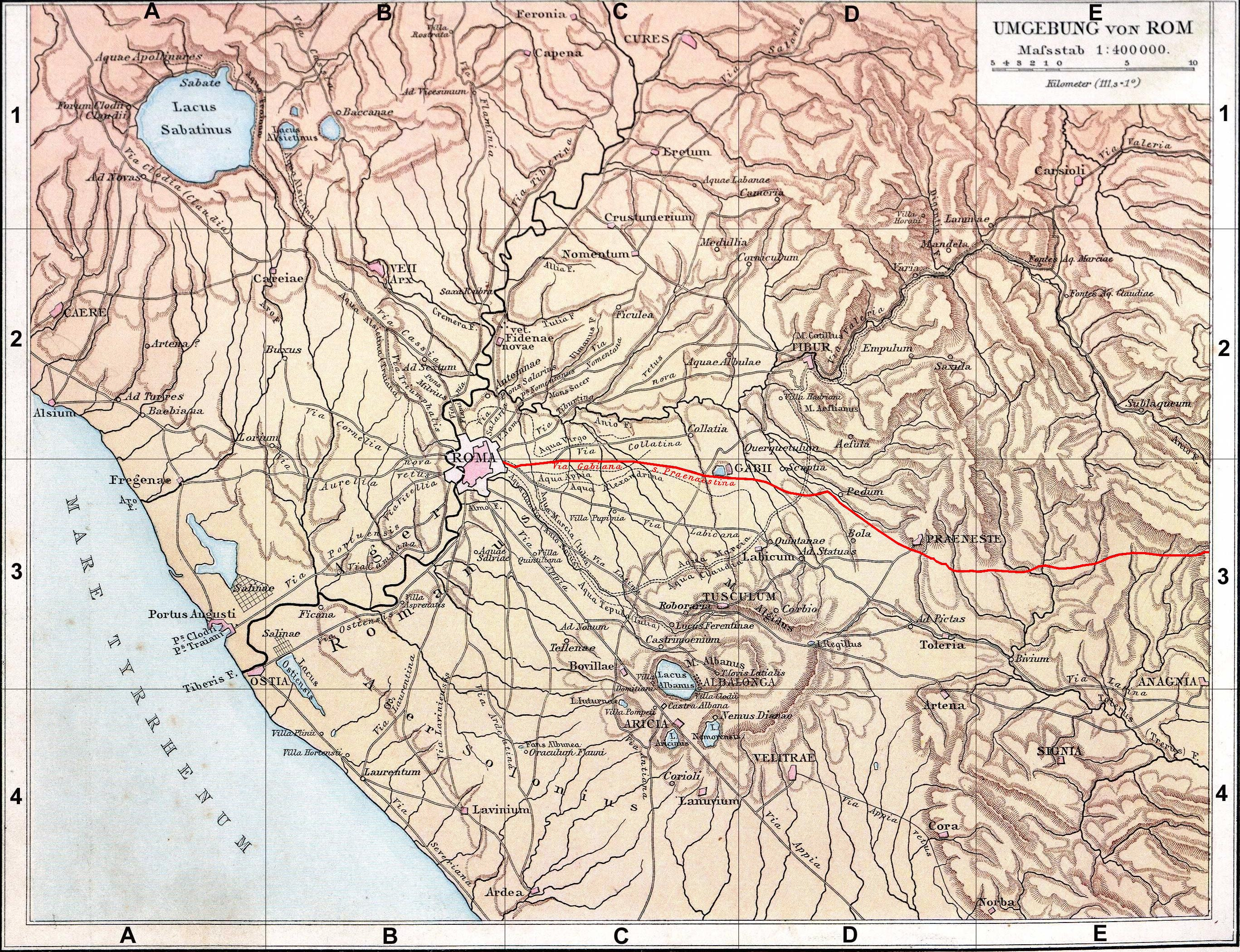
Route of Via Praenestina from Rome in a map of ancient Latium.

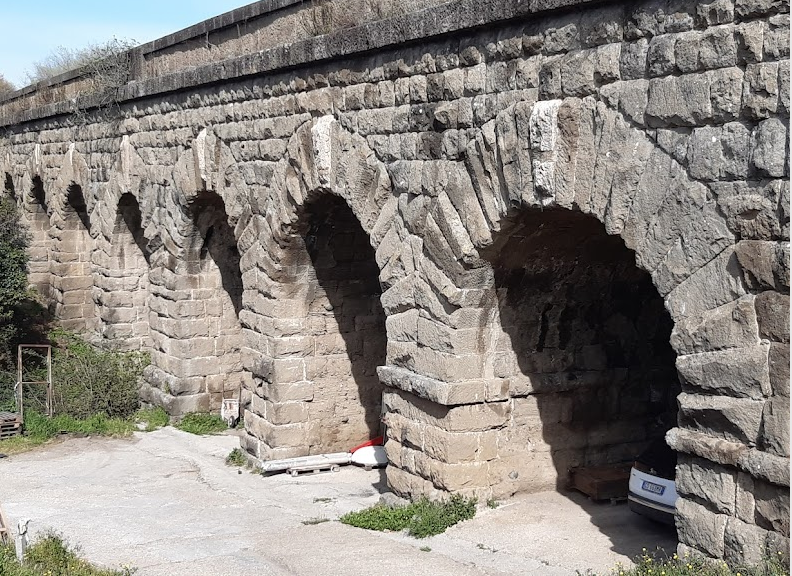
Roman Ponte di Nona.

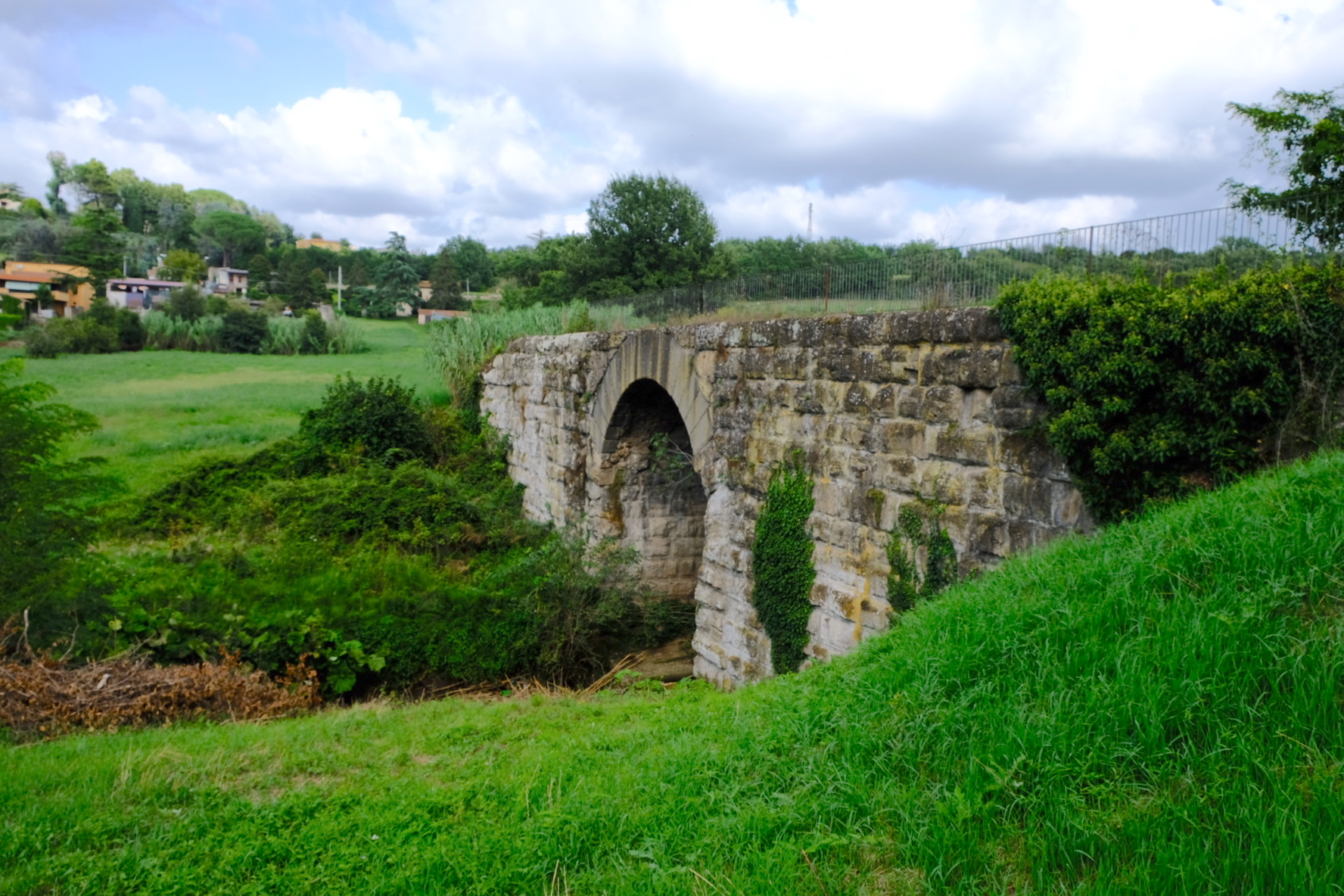
Ponte Amato.

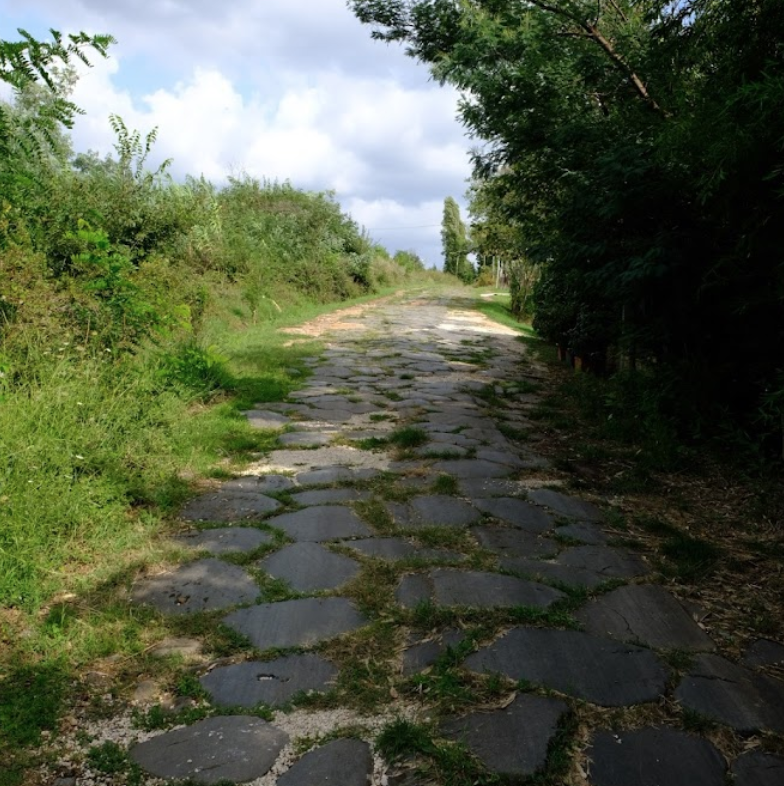
Via Praenestina near Ponte Amato.

The Via Praenestina (modern Italian: Via Prenestina) was an ancient Roman road in central Italy.

Initially called Via Gabiana, from Gabii, the ancient city of Old Latium to which it ran, it received a new name having been extended as far as Praeneste (modern Palestrina). Once past Praeneste the road continued towards the Apennines and the source of the Anio River.

At the ninth mile the road crosses a ravine by the well-preserved and lofty Ponte di Nona, with seven arches, the finest ancient bridge in the neighbourhood of Rome. The line of the road is, considering the difficulty of the country beyond Gabii, very straight. Half-way between Gabii and Praeneste is a well-preserved single-arched bridge, Ponte Amato.
