= Luceria =

Coordinates: 44°36′32″N 10°24′42″E

- Interactive map of Luceria
- Type: Colonia
- Periods: 4th century BC
- Cultures: Ligurians, Romans
- Location: Canossa, Italy

Site notes
- Area: 10
- Excavation dates: 1776-1786, 1861-1862
- Archaeologists: Angelo Schenoni, Gaetano Chierici

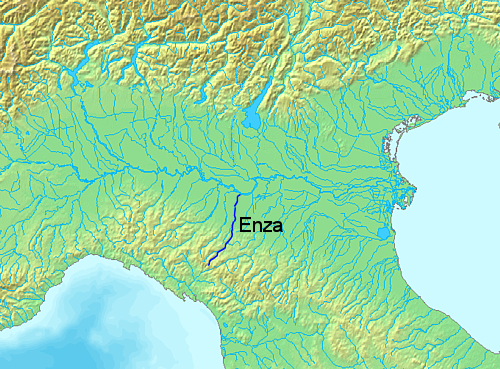
Po river basin

Luceria is an ancient city in the northern Apennines, located in the comune of Canossa in the Province of Reggio Emilia, on the right bank of the river Enza.

== Toponym ==
The name might derive from lucus, which means "sacred grove".
It is not clear if this was the proper name of the city or if it was called Nuceria.
The little stream which separates Canossa from San Polo d'Enza is still called the Rio Luceria today. The name of this stream is fairly old as it appears in the 1364 property records of Azzo da Correggio as Rivum Luxerae.

The Egyptian astronomer and mathematician Claudius Ptolemy (85-165 AD) describes the position of the city with great precision in his Geographia, indicating the latitude and longitude according to the system he invented, but he calls it Nuceria.

However, Luceria is the best-attested and most used name, even in official documents.

== History ==
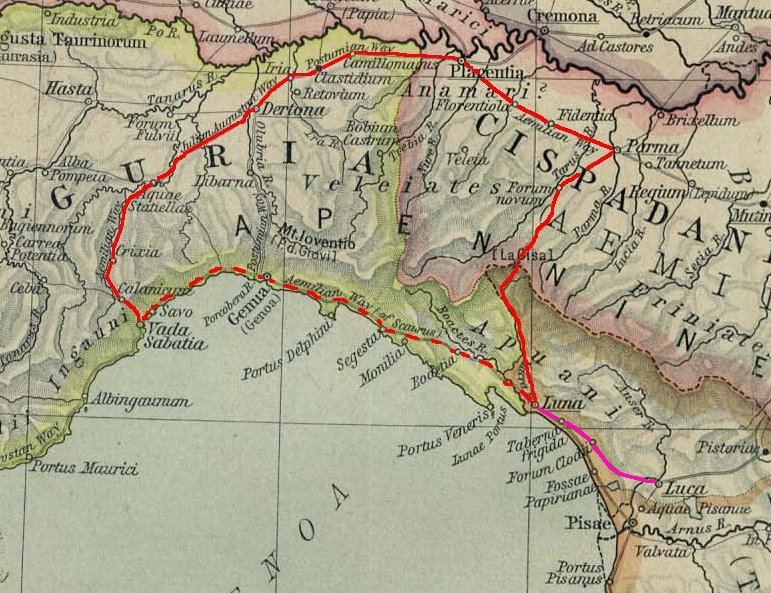
Northwest Italy around AD 100

Luceria probably arose as a mercantile centre in the 4th century BC. It was located in Gallia Cispadana, at the meeting point of three important communication routes: the old road which travelled from the river Po along the right bank of the river Enza to the south where it crossed the Apennines to Tuscia; the foothill track which connected the western zone to the east; and the mountain track which led up towards the hills where the medieval castle would later be built.

The first inhabitants of the place were the Ligurians, probably the Friniati, who developed close ties with the neighbouring Etruscans of Servirola (modern San Polo d'Enza), after some initial hostility. They took advantage of the strategic position of their settlement to trade with settlements which were further afield too.

In the 2nd century BC, the Roman Republic colonised the Po Valley and became very interested in the nodal points of the various territories for both economic and military reasons. They settled at Luceria, leading to the development of a mixed population and the transformation of what had been just an open-air market into a proper town with houses, public buildings, paved roads, sidewalks and services for travellers, like accommodation for livestock with running water and warehouses for storing goods.

The customs and traditions of the Ligurians did not disappear and the Romans did not impose their own culture. Instead, Roman culture merged with the native one slowly, probably accompanied by cross-cultural marriages. The Romanisation of Luceria dates to the Republican era, but the city actually became important later on, in the 1st and 2nd centuries AD, under the Roman Empire.

At this time there were small neighbouring villages south of the rio Vico, which still exist today, such as Vico (Latin for "village"), Taverne (from the Latin Tabernae) and Carbonizzo (from carbonescere, "to collect charcoal").

Traces of a vast fire which destroyed all the wooden structures in the city date to this period. They were replaced with brick buildings on strong stone foundations. Thereafter Luceria expanded to its maximum size, occupying around 100,000 m^{2}, bordered on the north by the Rio Luceria and to the south by the Rio Vico and crossed diagonally by a major paved street, which reaches up to 6 metres in width.

Luceria is also mentioned in a letter written by the Emperor Valentinian I to his prefect Rufinus about grazing rights, which ends VIIII Kal. Oct., Luceriae Valentiniano et Valente aa. conss. (23 September 365). Subsequently, the city of Luceria was suddenly abandoned for unknown reasons.

Although these years were hard for the Empire, the battles which took place on the frontiers probably could not have drastically affected an economically prosperous settlement in the interior, like Luceria. But it cannot be ruled out that the settlement was attacked by soldiers or deserters in search of food. A catastrophic natural disaster has found more support. This is deduced from the many coins which have been found through excavation and random finds during tillage over the centuries. A particularly strong earthquake or flood could have caused the inhabitants to flee, abandoning all their possessions, treasures and plate. (Note: In 788 AD, Paul the Deacon recorded that the whole Po Valley was devastated by an enormous flood, which caused destruction and death. But by this time, Luceria had probably already ceased to exist. Paul the Deacon, Sancti Ambrosii Mediolanensi Episcopi Opera-Epistolarum-Classi I There is a document in the State Archives of Modena from 1660, which mentions a destructive flood caused by the small, apparently safe rio Luceria the previous year, which had devastated 80 biolca of land. Afterwards there was litigation among the neighbouring communities over the assignment of the land. Document in the State Archives of Modena, Confini di Stato, Filza 45 B.I. M.Jotti, I Feudatari di S.Polo d'Enza: Gonzaga e Gherardini (1591-1796), in "Bollettino Storico Reggiano", Reggio Emilia 1987)

After such disastrous events it was very easy for the survivors to move back and reconstruct what had been destroyed. Apparently economic activity had also declined and commercial traffic probably declined ever more, impoverishing the area.

After Luceria was abandoned, it was repeatedly spoliated, as common in the Middle Ages, for valuable building materials to be reused in new constructions (the place was called Predàro until the 18th century).). Thus the settlement disappeared from view and, in time, from local memory too. Interest in this lost city revived during the Renaissance when the work of Ptolemy was rediscovered and published. Many authors mentioned Luceria, with varying degrees of specificness, in their works, like Raffaele Maffei da Volterra in his Commentari Urbani from the early 1500s; friar Leandro Alberti in his Descrittione di tutta l'Italia of 1577 (Note: Frà Leandro Alberti, Descrittione di Tutta Italia, Anselmo Giaccarelli ed., Bologna, 1550, pag. 328verso: "Going further into the mountains one sees Caran, Cian. It is reported that Nuceria was in this area, as mentioned by Volaterranus in the sixth book of his Commentari Urbani since people find coins and other things which indicate that there was something there in antiquity) and Paul van Merle in his Cosmographia published in Amsterdam in 1605. Scholars like Johann Jacob Hofmann (1698) (Note: Johann Jacob Hofmann, Lexicon Universale, quatuor tomis distributum, Leiden, 1698, léber II, p. 854: Luceria, sive Nuceria, Ptol. opp. Gall. Cispad. nunc est castr. Luzara, ad Padum, in Duc. Mantuano; ..., (Luceria, or Nuceria, known from Ptolemy, a town in Cisalpine Gaul, is now the fortress of Luzara near Padua in the duchy of Mantua)) and Ludovico Antonio Muratori (1744) (Note: Lodovico Antonio Muratori, Annali d'Italia, Milano, 1744, II, p 438: "As recorded in the Laws of the Codex Theodosianus... for a good part of the present year the Augustus Valentinian stayed in Milan; then he made an assize through various cities of Italy, as demonstrated by those of his laws which were issued in Sinigaglia, Fano, Verona, Aquileja, and Luceria (which cannot be the city in the Kingdom of Naples, but perhaps Luzzara in Mantua or in Guastala)") thought that Luceria was ancient Luzzara, which is usually considered to have been founded by the Lombards, although recently Roman and pre-Roman remains have been discovered in the apse of the Church of San Giorgio, which make the equation more plausible.

== Excavations ==
Archaeological research was undertaken at Luceria in a very fragmentary way from the second half of the 18th century. The long gaps between excavations led to the destruction of the built structures which were brought to light and the loss of many important artefacts which were sold or reused by the local population.

=== Excavations of Angelo Schenoni (1776-1786) ===
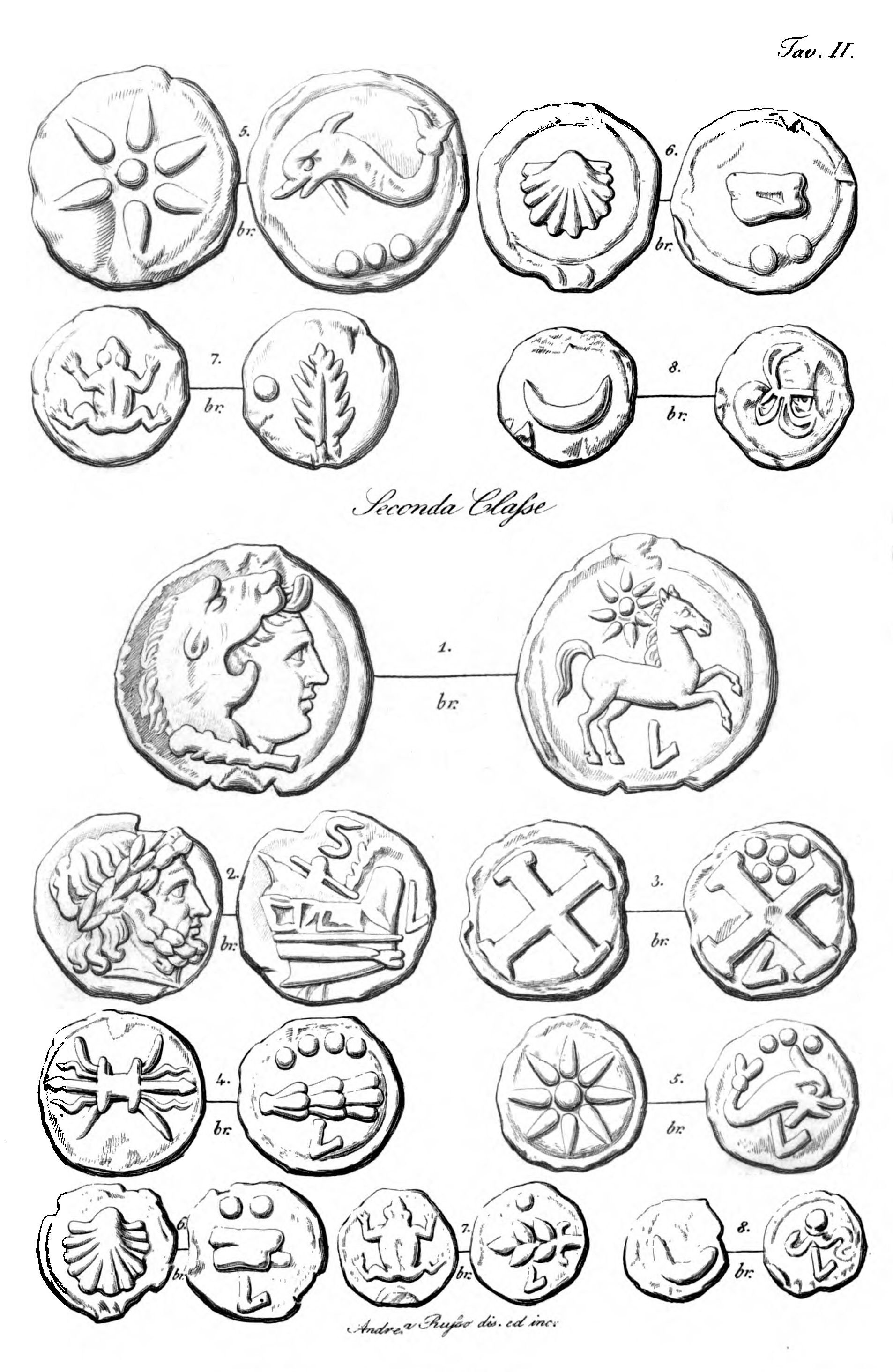
Le monete attribuite alla zecca dell'antica città di Luceria, page 43

The first excavations of the site began on 21 May 1776 and were continued after a nine-year gap in 1785.
At this time Canossa belonged to the Duchy of Parma and the excavations were carried out by the abbot Angelo Schenoni, curator of the Museo di Parma.
Today archaeology is viewed as a science for reconstructing the past, but in the 18th century it was understood as a method of recovering "antiquities." Trenches measuring well over three hundred and fifty metres in length were dug with the sole object of recovering vases, statues, and various other objects for display in the museum collections, with no concern for the precious information which the excavation works were destroying.
The archives describe the discovery of foundations made up of two semicircular walls nine cubits long and two cubits thick, linked by another two straight walls. No remnants of this monumental apsidal structure have been discovered by subsequent excavations.

When the excavations ended in August 1786, the whole area was left in a mess and the structures which had not been recovered were looted.

All the mobile objects discovered in these years, including clay lamps, glass vase fragments, keys and nails made of various metals, fibulae, rings and jewelry, are now conserved in the Museo Nazionale di Antichità di Parma.
The coins deserve special discussion. Both silver and bronze of all types and denominations were found in large amounts in a good state of preservation. The dates of these coins range from the Republican period to the Late Empire, with the last coin belonging to the Emperor Valerius Valens.
In later excavations also, the discovery of large numbers of coins is reported, but these were not recorded in detail, meaning that the precious information that they could have offered about the chronology of the city has been lost.

=== Excavations of Gaetano Chierici (1861–1862) ===
In 1861, a farmer ploughing his field discovered four relatively intact tombs. (Note: One of these tombs has been reconstructed in the Civici Musei di Reggio Emilia.) This drew the attention of scholar-priest don Gaetano Chierici, one of the fathers of Italian prehistoric studies, and he began new excavations on the site on 9 September 1862.

After the Unification of Italy, the area became part of the Provincia di Reggio Emilia.

These excavations were conducted in a more scientific manner than the earlier ones and revealed the old paved road which crossed Luceria at an angle and was perfectly preserved. They also revealed foundations of houses next to it; a four-metre-tall stone column on a cone-shaped base, which was probably part of a building facade; pavements; and numerous tombs, both inhumations and cremations. Some of these tombs in addition to the usual contents, contained twisted and broken swords and jewelry – part of an ancient funerary ritual of the Ligurians. Don Gaetano Chierici produced a competent and detailed analysis of the discoveries, with the hope of aiding further work which was not possible at the time. The items unearthed by his excavations are now conserved in the Civico Museo di Reggio Emilia.
Afterwards the whole area returned to agricultural use.

=== 20th century ===
During the construction of a local railway in 1909, further Roman Imperial coins were discovered, as well as a 30 centimetre long stone hatchet indicating the presence of prehistoric humans in the area, (Note: The hatchet is a characteristically prehistoric item, used both for warfare and agriculture. O.Siliprandi, Scavi archeologici avvenuti nella Provincia di Reggio Emilia nell'ultimo cinquantennio (1886-1935), Reggio E.1936) and further tombs. The tombs, of Roman date, were clustered in three separate groups: one with Ligurian-Celtic period remains, one dating to the Liguria-Roman period and one dating to the Late Empire, with Paleochristian symbols of the 4th century AD.

In 1925, the scholar Andrea Balletti published a volume on the history of Reggio Emilia, which put the existence of Luceria in serious doubt. He pointed to the paucity of discoveries and argued that the settlement was an unreliable invention of historians.

From 1967 to 1985, despite the steady expansion of construction, the area was systematically monitored in order that any archaeological evidence that was recovered would not be lost.
A long campaign to protect the area began in 1985.

Thanks to a joint effort of the Soprintendenza, the comune of Canossa, the group "Amici di Luceria" (Friends of Luceria) and the "Gruppo Archeologico VEA", supported by a grant from the Manodori foundation, Luceria became an archaeological area on 31 May 2014. This inauguration spurred a number of efforts to develop the area. Although small, the archaeological area allows visitors to see some parts of the well-preserved paved road which bisected the settlement and some adjacent structures (including a well and foundations of structures of various different building phases). The site is open every Sunday afternoon from 3pm to 5pm between 8 June and 1 November, except when there is bad weather.

== Bibliography ==
1. Otello Siliprandi, Notizie di Luceria, R. Bojardi, Reggio Emilia, 1929, 14 pages.
2. Luciano Patroncini, "Luceria", Bollettino storico reggiano, 2.4, Futurgraf, Reggio Emilia, 1969.
3. Enrica Cerchi, "Luceria e il popolamento romano nella bassa valle dell'Enza", pag. 69–83 in L'Emilia in età romana,
  vol. 97 of the Nuova serie della biblioteca della Deputazione di Storia patria per le Antiche provincie Modenesi, 1987.
4. L. Malnati, E. Cerchi, I. Chiesi & D. Labate, "Gli scavi di Ciano d'Enza (RE) 1983-1985 e il problema del rapporto tra Liguri e Romani," in Miscellanea di Studi Archeologici e di Antichità III, Modena, 1990: 75–110.
5. Luciano Patroncini, Luceria d'Enza, insediamento ligure-romano nel territorio di Canossa, Associazione Industriali della Provincia di Reggio Emilia, Reggio Emilia, 1994.
6. Enzo Lippolis, "Provincia di Reggio Emilia," in Schede di archeologia dell'Emilia-Romagna, (1996-2002).
7. Enzo Lippolis, "Canossa, loc. Luceria," sec. 3.17 of Archeologia dell'Emilia-Romagna I/2, Firenze, 1997.
8. Gennaro Riccio, Le monete attribuite alla zecca dell'antica città di Luceria, Google books (published by Virgilio, 1846)
