= Caty =

Caty may refer to:

== People ==
- Caty Dehaene (born 1965), Belgian snooker player
- Caty Flagg (born 1998), American ice hockey player
- Caty Louette (1713-1776), African signara and businessperson
- Caty McNally (born 2001), American tennis player

== Other ==
- CATY, holding company for Cathay Bank

== See also ==
- Cati (disambiguation)
- Katy (disambiguation)
