= Ponte di Nona =

The Ponte di Nona is one of the best-preserved examples of a Roman bridge, dating back to the late 2nd-century BCE. The bridge is supported by seven arches constructed of peperino tuff-stone and is raised 12 metres (39 ft) over the underlying river valley, which is itself 70 metres (230 ft) wide. There is also a smaller, more ancient bridge that is located underneath the Ponte di Nona. Besides the bridge is an ancient sanctuary situated about 13.3 kilometres (8.3 mi) outside of Rome. The site was first excavated in 1912, though archaeological work in the area recommenced in the 1960s following the opening of a pozzolana quarry nearby. From 1975-1976, the sanctuary was excavated by Timothy W. Potter, as part of an effort to ensure that the site was not looted for the antiquities market.

The sanctuary was destroyed by quarrying in the 1960s, and consequently little of the original site survives. Based on datable coin and pottery finds from the sanctuary site, it flourished between 250-150 BCE. None of the surviving evidence from the site provides any indication as to what deity was worshipped there. There is evidence for a former enclosure, presumably the temenos, as well as a circular structure—which has been interpreted as a pool, possibly fed by the nearby spring—and also an old building that may have been a mansio, potentially for pilgrims seeking to visit the site. Moreover, the site contained two large recesses, which collectively contained 8,395 anatomical votives, particularly votive feet. Due to the presence of such a large number of anatomical feet, it has been suggested that the site was likely frequented by individuals seeking remedies for their own movement disabilities. However, the site was located atop a ridge, which would have been difficult, perhaps even excruciatingly painful, to access for an individual suffering from any physical impairment. According to the archaeologist Emma-Jayne Graham, the experience of intense pain on the part of any suppliant would have emphasized their journey towards the sanctuary, and consequently its religious significance, whilst also fundamentally intertwining the disability of the suffer with the nature of this sacred space. The historian Ray Laurence suggests that the thermal spring may have itself attracted visitors, many of whom perhaps sustained injuries to their feet or other body parts during their journey.

Besides votive feet, the site contained about 1,000 votive eyes, which are variously depicted with or without the eyelids and the periocular tissue, implying that the dedicants sought to address medical conditions that concerned either exclusively the eyeball or both the eyeball and the surrounding areas. There were also numerous votive heads and half-heads at Ponte di Nona, perhaps to treat headaches, which would have been a common medical condition amongst rural laborers, who spent long hours in the Sun with poor nutrition and living conditions. However, it is also possible that these votives were designed to treat any number of other medical conditions, such as perhaps baldness or scabies amongst others. Few votive sex organs or internal body parts have been discovered at Ponte di Nona, perhaps because other sanctuaries were responsible for treating illnesses pertaining to those votives.
