= Kati Zsigóné =

Hungarian fine artist

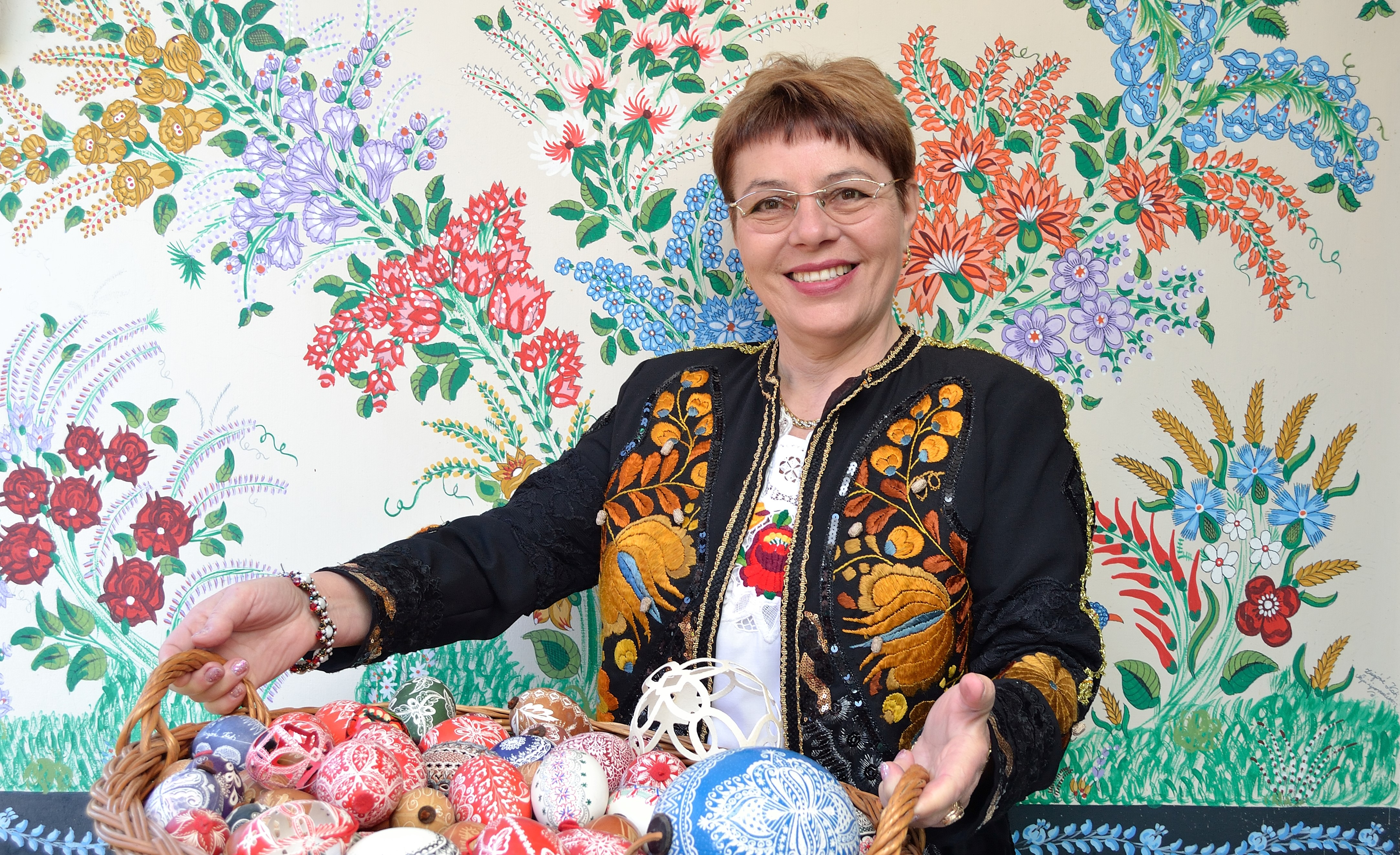
- Zsigóné with her art: paintings, embroidery and eggs
- Born: Julianna Bagi; June 16, 1953 (age 72); Kecskemét, Hungary
- Occupations: fine artist, egg painter, traditional artist
- Years active: 1978 –

Kati Zsigóné (Józsefné Zsigó, born Julianna) (born 16 June 1953 in Kecskemét) is a Hungarian fine artist, egg painting artist. In 2009 in Dubai, she was chosen among the top five egg painting artists in the world, and the best one on the European continent.

== Life ==
Her father was a farmer and basket weaver. Julianna (who got her nickname ’Kati’ from her father) saw her parents divorce at her age of three, caused by the coarseness and alcoholism of her father. Her mother raised her as her only child in poverty. Kati had to work from the age of 14, because the low wage her mother received for being a cleaning lady in the local catholic high school wasn't enough to sustain themselves.

She married József Zsigó on 7 May 1977, their daughter, Katalin was born 9 July 1978, while their granddaughter, Panna was born 3 January 2013.

== Artistry ==
Her artistry unfolded because of the support of her husband, until today he is her most important supporter and inspiration. The start of her career was the birth of their daughter, when she wanted to hire painter ladies to decorate the room of her daughter; her husband persuaded her to paint the room herself. Because of this, she started to practice drawing and painting on a higher level. Among the eight forms of artistry she practices today, the first one was wall-painting. After that, she got involved in tile-painting, furniture painting, creation of oil paintings (which depict horses, Hungarian native animals, landscapes and icons), rosette ceilings, painting and scratching of dishes, and the embroidery of clothes, table cloths and vests. She also practices a form of art called ’’riseliőzés’’.

The final form of art she learned was glass painting (including icons) - her first major work in this field was the decoration of the cabinets at her own exhibition. But the branch of art she is fond of the most is egg painting. She decided to involve herself in this art after she got to enjoy the motives (including flowers) and colors of wall painting. Since then, she is spreader and teacher of Hungarian folk art.

She makes nearly 300 types of egg decorations using over 20 different techniques.

She has painted, scratched, engraved, waxed, lacy, applique, washed, carved, etched, tapestry eggs, eggs with horseshoes etc. She often uses combined techniques on her eggs as well.

She mainly uses eggs of hens, geese, ducks, ostriches, emus, greater rheas and parrots.

Among her most notable creations, we find eggs that are a meter or even 2 meters tall, eggs decorated with silver and gold, and she also captured Leonardo’s famous painting The Last Supper. Her own, self-drawn collection of motifs include nearly 3500 different egg- and other motifs of folk art.

She has an own collections of over 3500 motifs, including egg painting and traditional motifs.

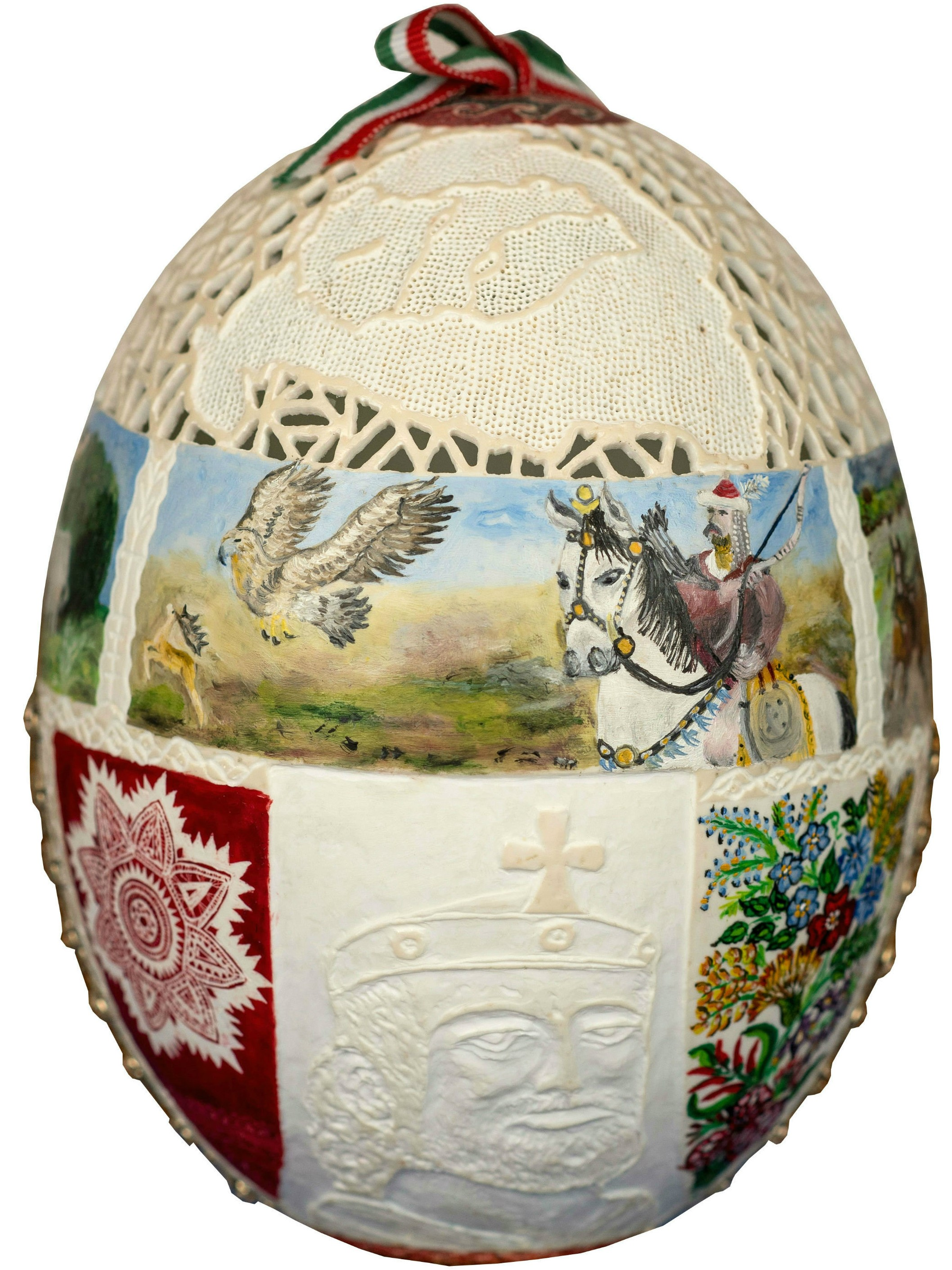
The Egg of the Hungarian Nation

=== The Egg of the Hungarian Nation ===
The Egg of the Hungarian Nation (Hungarian: ’’A Magyar nemzet Tojása’’) is a special egg Zsigóné made in 2018, for the 980th anniversary of the death of Stephen I. The base was the egg of an ostrich. She utilized 11 different techniques on it (including painting, waxing, scratching, carving, batik, dotting, horseshoeing etc.) creating 79 patterns, including Hungarian motifs (halas lace, Matyó- and Kalocsai lace etc.). The motifs, images and signals depicted on the egg commemorate different important moments and symbols of Hungarian history, including the Hungarian crown jewels, the turul, the Conquest of the Carpathian Basin, the Blood oath, or the Treaty of Trianon, as well as the Assumption of Mary and 16 golden horseshoes.

The work on this egg lasted for over a year, including four months for placing the motifs.

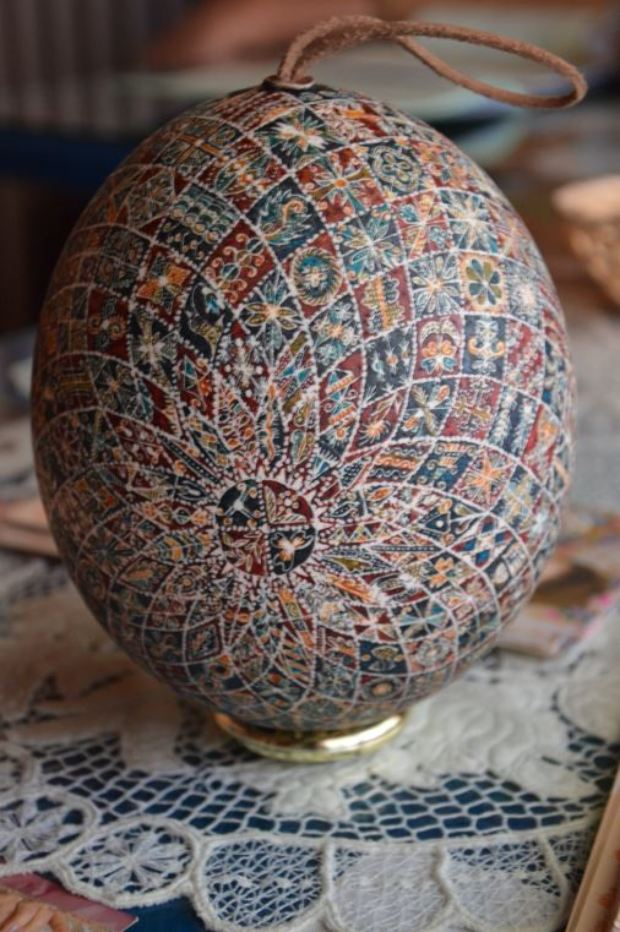
The Talking Egg

=== The Talking Egg ===
Another special egg created by zsigóné is the Talking Egg (Hungarian: A Beszélő Tojás). This egg uses traditional waxed technique, and depicts 348 classic, traditional Hungarian motifs, which are separated by 13000 dots, symbolizing seeds.

The base of this piece of art was a 49x44 cm ostrich egg, the process took seven months and was finished in 2019. For easier understanding, Zsigóné also made a 30-page illustrated guidebook, which includes explanations of the symbols found on the egg.

=== Egg of the World ===
Created on an ostrich egg using two different decoration methods, painting and engraving, depicting 100 different patterns, which are placed in an elliptic shape, representing the rotation of the Earth. The egg depicts 40 notable historical figures, including Albert Einstein, Thomas Alva Edison, Marie Curie, Ignác Semmelweis, Ede Teller, Isaac Newton, Stephen Hawking, Leonardo da Vinci, Nikola Tesla, Wolfgang Amadeus Mozart, Mahatma Gandhi, Mother Teresa, Yuri Gagarin, Jesus Christ, and Pelé, among others, as well as 4 contemporary figures like Bill Gates and Oprah Winfrey. 4 Hungarian people are also present, just like the initials of the artist herself. Furthermore, the egg depicts 14 well-known buildings and structures like the Giza pyramid complex, the Great Wall of China, the Christ the Redeemer statue of Rio, Taj Mahal, the Moai statues, or Petra of Jordan, as well as 30 objects and expressions which bear importance in the human life, like peace, the DNA, time, writing, family, numbers, movie, flight, healing, time etc. The 14 most notable religions and 16 diamonds in golden socket are also present on the surface of the egg. As not only positive, but also negative things are related to mankind, the egg tries to represent this by depicting negativities like war, famine, epidemics, terrorism, natural disasters or environmental pollution alike.

She spent no less than 3 years decorating the egg, the craftsmanship itself took 6 months, the rest was collection and processing of the materials. Her goal was to find motives which best represent mankind, in order to offer at least one familiar motif to everyone around the world. The creation aims to be a message for every human being, stressing the importance of loving each other and the protection of our planet.

The artwork was unveiled on 7 March 2023.

== Awards ==
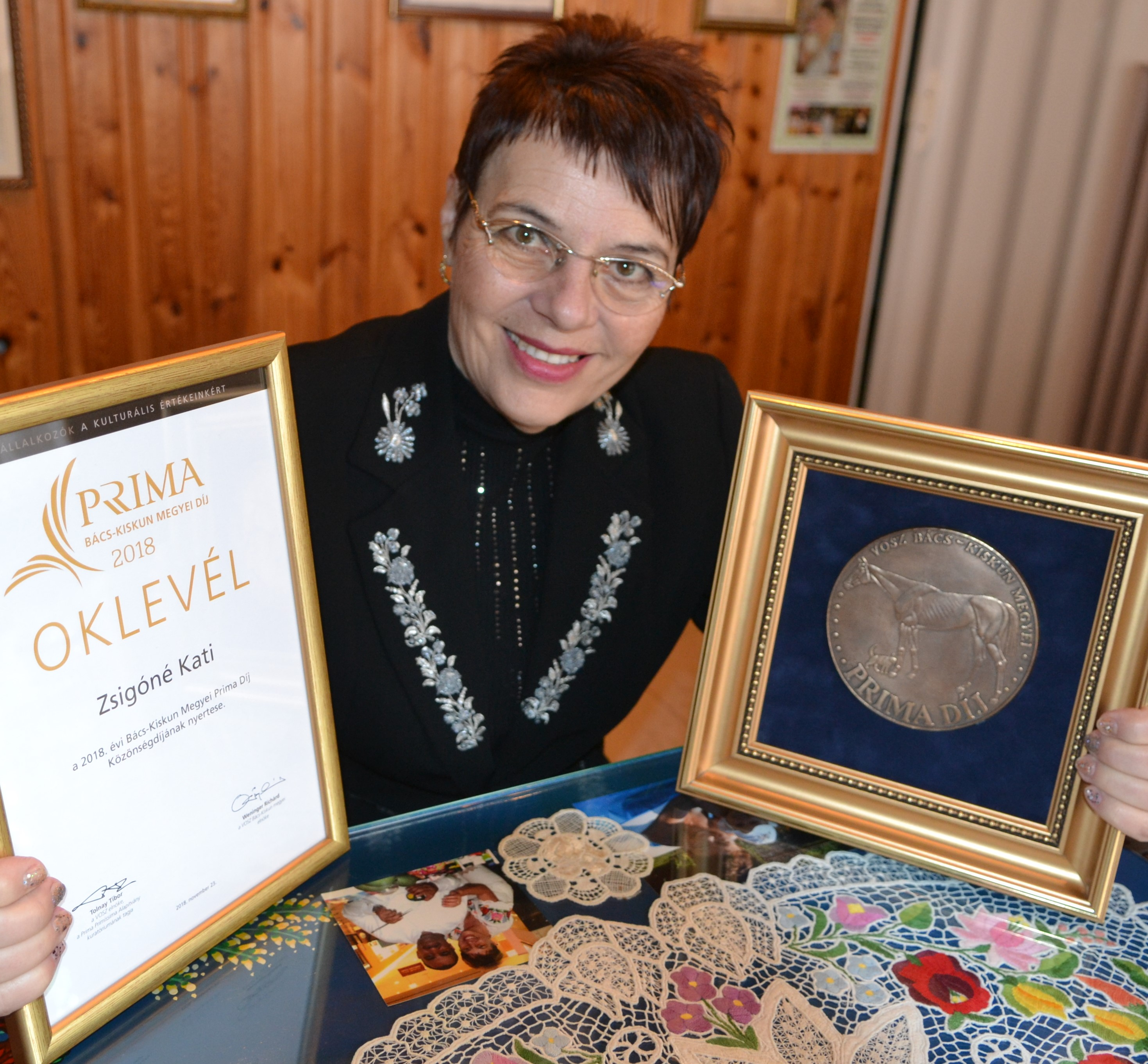

- 1995: Népi Iparművész-díj (circa Traditional Fine Artist of the Year)
- 2004: A nap embere (People of the Day award)
- 2009: Dubai: she was chosen among the top five egg painting artists in the world, and the best one in Europe.
- 2011: she released a portrait film in five languages, titled A tojásdíszítés királynője (The Queen of Egg Painting), on a disc decorated with 24 carat gold.
- 2017: she was chosen member of the British Encyclopaedia
- 2018: Kecskemét Mestere díj (Master of Kecskemét Award)
- 2018: winner of the category Hungarian traditional art and public education
- 2018: Prima-award
- 2018: her work was declared National Value
- 2019: Harmónia-award
- 2021: Vitézi Rend Lovagkeresztje
- 2021: Kárpát-medencei Vitézi Rend vitézi kardos nagy jelvénye
- 2021: Nemzeti Önazonosságunk Védelmezője cím
- 2023: Bács-Kiskun Vármegye Kultúrájáért Díj
- 2023: Magyar Bronz Érdemkereszt polgári tagozat kitüntetés
- 2024: A Magyar Művészeti Akadémia tagjává választotta, mint a "A magyar művészeti és kulturális élet jeles képviselőjét."
- 2025 Elismerő oklevél a kazahsztáni mesterkurzus magasszintű megtartásáért.
- 2026 Magyar Kultúra lovagja
- 2026 Munkássága értékként bekerült a Bács-Kiskun Vármegyei Értéktárba és kulturális örökségnek nyilvánították

== Books ==
- Készítsünk együtt hímes tojást! (1999) – released in German translation as well
- Tojásdíszítés mesterfokon (2002)

== Exhibitions ==
Zsigóné had her creations exhibited in Hungary, in the Danish Cultural Institute and in Herend (together with the famous Herend porcelains), as well as in Dubai and in Brussels.

In 2014, she created her own exhibition in her own home, which is visited by Hungarians and foreigners alike.
