= Cati =

Cati may refer to:

== People ==
- Francisco Cati, Mexican football player
- Pasquale Cati (1550–1620), Italian painter
- Twm Siôn Cati

== Places ==
- Catí, Valencia, Spain
- Cati River, Brazil

== Other ==
- Computer-assisted telephone interviewing

== See also ==
- Caty (disambiguation)
- Kati (disambiguation)
