= Kati Hiekkapelto =

- Born: September 8, 1970 (age 56); Oulu, Finland
- Writing career
- Language: Finnish
- Genres: Crime, fiction, Nordic Noir
- Website: www.katihiekkapelto.com

Kati Hiekkapelto (born 8 September 1970 in Oulu, Finland) is a Finnish novelist, performance artist and punk singer.

== Career ==
Following her studies in special education, Hiekkapelto worked as a special-needs teacher for a time in Serbia among its minority Hungarian population.

In 2013, Hiekkapelto published her first novel, Kolibri (Hummingbird). Its protagonist, a police detective, Anna Fekete, is an immigrant to Finland from the erstwhile Yugoslavia. The book was a critical as well as popular success, and has been translated into several languages, including English and German.

A sequel Suojattomat (The Defenceless) came out in 2015. It won the Finnish prize Vuoden johtolanka for crime fiction.

The third book in the series, Tumma (The Exiled) was published in 2016.

Hiekkapelto lives on Hailuoto, an island in northern Finland.

Hiekkapelto performs in a punk band Parrakas nainen (The Bearded Woman).

== Bibliography ==
- Hummingbird. Translated by Hackston, David. Arcadia. 2014. ISBN 978-1909807563.
- The Defenceless. Translated by Hackston, David. Orenda Books. 2015. ISBN 978-1910633137.
- The Exiled. Translated by Hackston, David. Orenda Books. 2016. ISBN 978-1910633519.
