= State Archives of Modena =

State archival institution in Modena, Italy

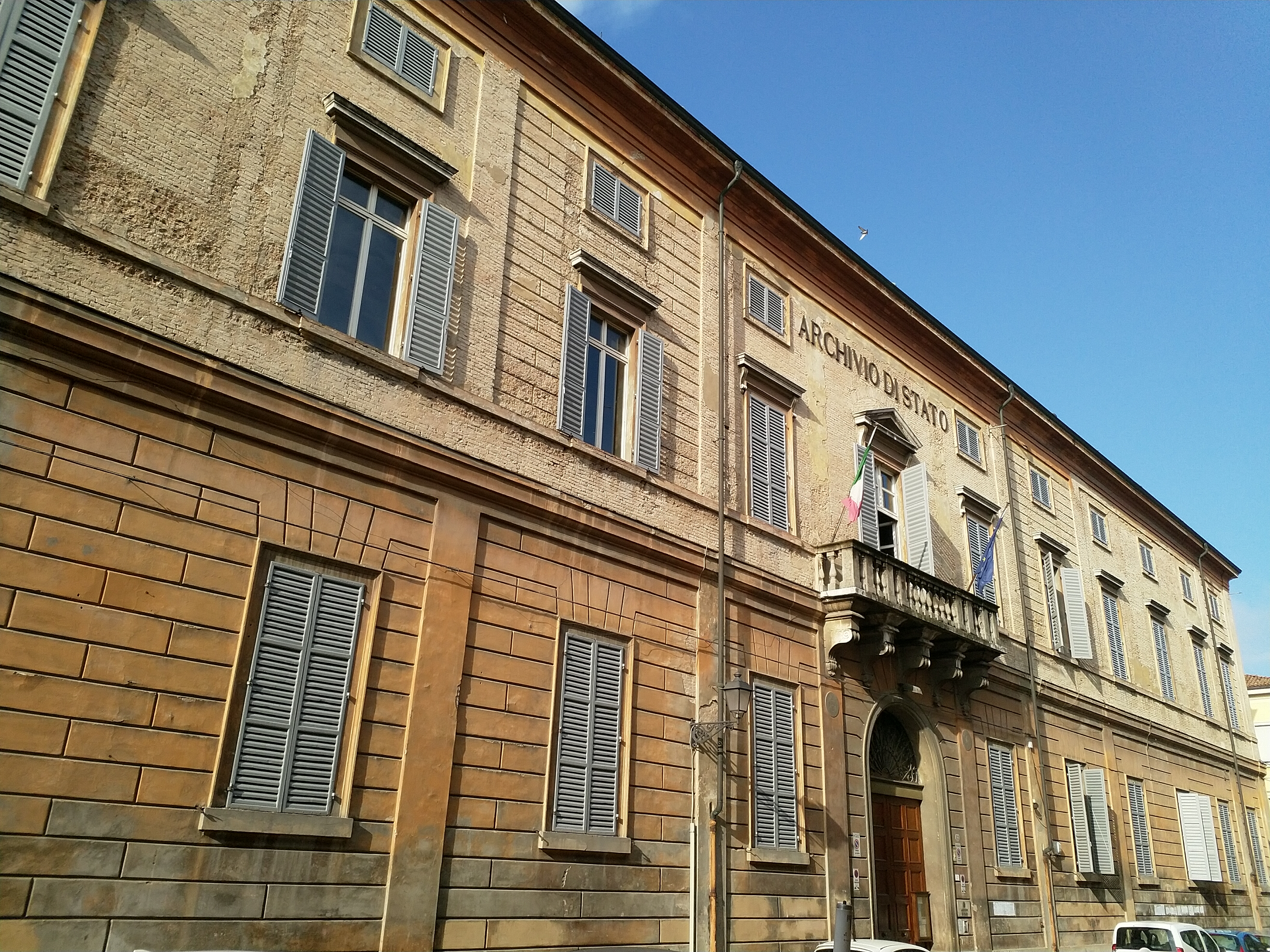
- Interactive map of State Archives of Modena
- 44°39′00″N 10°55′41″E
- Location: Modena, Emilia-Romagna, Italy
- Type: State archive
- Established: 1874
- Website: https://asmo.cultura.gov.it/home

The State Archives of Modena (Italian: Archivio di Stato di Modena) is a public archival institution located in Modena, Emilia-Romagna, Italy. It preserves historical records produced by the governmental and administrative institutions that operated in the province of Modena as part of the national archival network administered by the Italian Ministry of Culture.

The archive was established in 1874 following the reorganization of the Italian archival system after the unification of Italy. It preserves the documentary fonds of the pre-unification Este states, including the Duchy of Modena and Reggio, the Duchy of Mirandola, the County of Novellara, as well as the archives of the House of Este.

== Sources ==
- "Archivio di Stato di Modena" (PDF). Guida generale degli Archivi di Stato italiani. Vol. II. Rome: Ministero per i beni culturali e ambientali. 1983. pp. 993–1088.
- "Archivio di Stato di Modena". Sistema archivistico nazionale (in Italian). Istituto centrale per gli archivi.
- "Archivio di Stato di Modena". TourER – Portale del patrimonio culturale dell'Emilia-Romagna (in Italian). Segretariato regionale del Ministero della cultura per l'Emilia-Romagna.
