= Cate =

- Gender: female

Origin
- Origin: Latin, French, English, Welsh,
- Meaning: pure or blessed

Other names
- Related names: Katherine; Catherine; Kathryn; Kathleen; Katarina; Katrina; Kait; Caitlin; Caitríona; Caterina; Catie; Caty; Kate; Katie; Katy; Katey; Katia; Catia; Katia

Cate is a feminine given name and a variant of Kate. The name has Latin, French, English, and Welsh origins. In addition, Cate is also a surname. Notable people with the name include:

== In film and television ==
- Cate Blanchett (born 1969), two time Academy Award winning Australian actress
- Cate Shortland (born 1968), Australian writer and director of film and television
- Keith Cate, main anchor for WFLA-TV in Tampa Bay, Florida since 2000
- Field Cate, American child actor

== In other fields ==
- Alf Cate (1878–1939), New Zealand cricketer
- Cate Campbell (born 1992), Australian swimmer
- Cate Edwards (born 1982), the oldest daughter of John Edwards
- Cate Reese (born 1999), American basketball player
- Cate Tiernan (born 1961), American writer
- Cate School, four-year, coeducational, college-preparatory boarding school outside Santa Barbara
- George W. Cate (1825–1905), American politician
- James L. Cate, Air Force intelligence official and part of the Air Force Historical Division during World War II
- Troy Cate (born 1980), American baseball player
- Henk ten Cate (born 1954), Dutch football manager, and a former professional player
- Catê (1973–2011), Brazilian football manager, and a former professional player

== See also ==
- Catherina (and similar spellings)
