= Katerina =

- Gender: Female

Origin
- Language: Greek
- Meaning: Pure

Other names
- Alternative spelling: Cyrillic: Катерина, romanized: Katerina; Greek: Κατερίνα, romanized: Katerína
- Variant form: Katherina
- Related names: Caterina
- See also: Katarina, Ekaterina, Yekaterina, Katherine, Katrina, Kateřina

Katerina (Greek: Κατερίνα, romanized: Katerína; Russian, Bulgarian and Macedonian: Катерина, romanized: Katerina) is a feminine given name. It is a Greek variant of Ekaterini and a Russian and Bulgarian short form of Ekaterina or Yekaterina.

== Notable people ==
Notable people named "Katerina" include:

- Katerina Anghelaki-Rooke (1939–2020) Greek poet, translator and lecturer
- Katerina Bassi (born 1977), Greek taekwondo athlete
- Katerina Batzeli (born 1958), Greek politician
- Kateřina Beková (born 2002), Czech canoeist
- Aikaterini Bliamou (born 1982), Greek swimmer
- Katerina Brim (born 1998), American Para-cyclist
- Katerina Dalaka (born 1992), Greek hurdler
- Katerina Deli (born 1975), Greek former basketball player
- Katerina Demetrashvili (born 2003), Czech politician
- Katerina Didaskalou (born 1960), Greek actress
- Katerina Georgiadou (born 1982), Greek fashion model
- Katerina Giota (born 1990), Greek volleyball player
- Katerina Gogou (1940–1993) Greek poet, author and actress
- Katerina Graham (born 1989), American actress, singer and model
- Katerina Harvati (born 1970), Greek paleoanthropologist
- Katerina Kanonidou, Greek fashion model
- Katerina Kechris, American statistician
- Katerina Koffa (born 1969), retired Greek sprinter
- Katerina Kontochristopoulou (born 1997), Greek fencer
- Katerina Ksenyeva (born 1975), Russia actress
- Katerina Lehou (born 1967), Greek actress
- Katerina Maleeva, Bulgarian tennis player
- Katerina Michalopoulou (born 1972), Greek Miss Hellas winner
- Katerina Moutsatsou (born 1972), Greek actress
- Kateřina Mrázová (born 1992), Czech ice hockey player
- Katerina Nikolaidou (born 1992) Greek rower athlete
- Katerina Papakosta (born 1961), greek politician
- Kateřina Pivoňková (born 1979), Czech backstroke swimmer
- Katerina Sakellaropoulou (born 1956), Greek judge, President of Greece
- Katerina Savvaidou (born 1972), Greek politician
- Katerina Sotiriou (born 1984), Greek basketball player
- Katerina Shpitsa (born 1985), Russian actress
- Katerina Stefanidi (born 1990), Greek pole vaulter
- Katerina Stikoudi (born 1985) Greek fashion model
- Katerina Thanou (born 1975), Greek sprinter
- Katerina Voggoli (born 1970), Greek retired discus thrower
- Katerina Yioulaki (1938–2025), Greek actress

Other:

- Katerina, a novel by Israeli author Aharon Appelfeld
- "Katerina", a season two episode of the TV series The Vampire Diaries
  - Katerina Petrova, AKA Katherine Pierce, a character in The Vampire Diaries that the episode centers around
- Katerina Alcantara-Guidotti, a character in 2012 Philippine romantic drama series Walang Hanggan which was portrayed by Julia Montes
- Katerina Kittycat, a character in Daniel Tiger's Neighborhood
- Katarina, a companion in Doctor Who
- Katerini, a city in Greece, formerly named Katerina

== Songs about Katerina ==
- "Aman, Katerina mou" [Alas, my Katerina] by Stellakis Perpiniadis
- "Ego kai i Katerina" [Me and Katerina] by Mihalis Violaris
- "H Katerina" by Dimitris Zevgas
- "Katerina Katerinaki" by Paschalis
- "Katerina Thessalonikia" [Katerina from Thessaloniki] by Vassilis Tsitsanis
- "Katerina" by Aliki Vougiouklaki
- "Katerina" by Nikos Oikonomidis
- "Katerina" by Stk
- "Katerina" by Yiannis Savvidakis
- "Katerina, karderina" [Katerina, the goldfinch] by Chronis Aidonidis
- "Katerino Mome" by Gloria & Nikolay Slaveev
- "Katyusha" Russian folk song
- "Mila, Katerina" [Speak, Katerina] by Manolis Mitsias
- "Omorfi mou Katerina" [My pretty Katerina] by Antonis Kalogiannis
- "Pame gia ypno, Katerina" [Let's go to sleep, Katerina] by Giannis Poulopoulos
- "Rina Katerina mou" [My Rina Katerina] by Dimitra Galani
- "Rina Katerina" by Kostas Bigalis
- "Ta matia sou Katerinio" [Your eyes, Katerina] by Michalis Violaris
- "Thessaloniki - Katerina" by Stelios Dionysiou
- "To Katerinio" by Chainides
- "To oneiro tis Katerinas" [Katerina's dream] by Chainides
- "Tora pou smigoun oi kairoi (Katerinio)" by Nikos Ksylouris
