= Katherine =

Feminine given name

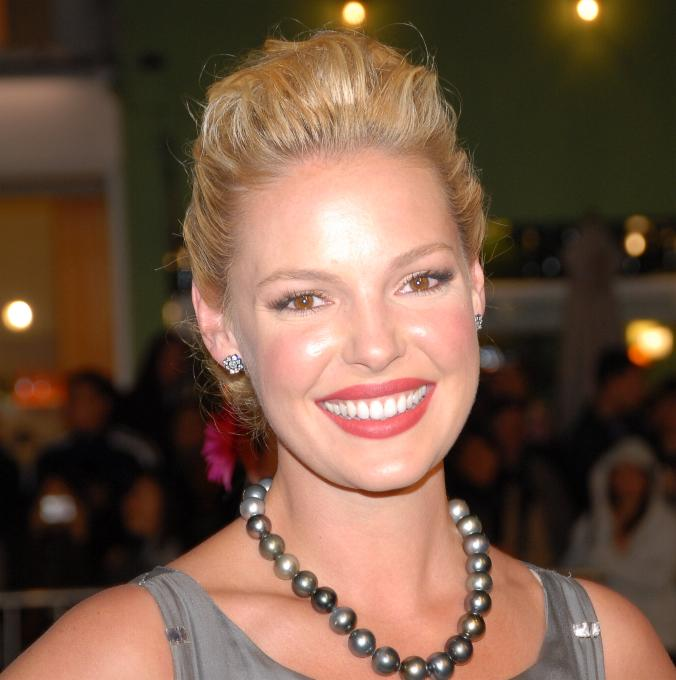
- Katherine Heigl at the premiere of 27 Dresses in 2008
- Gender: Female

Origin
- Language: Greek
- Region of origin: Ancient Greece

Other names
- Nicknames: Kate, Kath, Cat, Cattie, Cate, Catey, Cath, Catie, Caite, Cait, Kathy, Kathie, Kathi, Katie, Katey, Katy, Kay, Kat, Katya, Katyusha, Katja, Kati, Kit, Kitty, Kasia, Cathy, Cathie
- Related names: Catalina, Cătălina or Katalina; Caitlín; Carin or Karen; Catarina or Katarina; Catharina or Katharina; Catharine or Katharine; Cate or Kate; Caterina or Katerina; Kathryn or Cathryn; Katheryn or Catheryn; Kathleen or Cathleen; Catherina or Katherina; Catriona, Catrìona or Caitríona; Katarzyna; Ekaterina or Yekaterina; Katrina or Catrina; Karina or Carina; Katyusha or Katiuscia

Katherine (/kæθərɪn/), also spelled Catherine and other variations, is a feminine given name. The name and its variants are popular in countries where large Christian populations exist, because of its associations with the early Christian saint Catherine of Alexandria.

In the early Christian era it came to be associated with the Greek adjective καθαρός (katharos), meaning 'pure'. This influenced the name's English spelling, giving rise to variants Katharine and Catharine. The spelling with a middle 'a' was more common in the past. Katherine, with a middle 'e', was first recorded in England in 1196 after being brought back from the Crusades.

== Popularity and variations ==
=== Anglophone use ===
In Britain and America, Catherine and its variants have been among the 100 most popular names since at least 1880. Amongst the most common variants are Katherine and Kathryn. The spelling Catherine is common in both English and French. Less-common variants in English include Katharine, Catharine, Cathryn, Katheryn, Katharyn, Kathryne, Katheryne, Katherin, and Kathrine.

Diminutives include: Katie, Katy, Kate, Kathy, Kathe, Kath, Kay, Kat, Katja or Katya, Kota, Katyusha, Katrya, Kitty, Kit, Kasia; many of these are also sometimes given as independent names.

Kathleen or Cathleen, Anglicized forms of the Irish Caitlín, have become established in the US among people with no Irish background, but is less popular in England and Wales. The form Karen, of Danish origin, is now often considered an independent name in English.

=== Language variants ===
The following is a list of various forms of the name Katherine, all ultimately associated with a common Greek-language origin of uncertain meaning but influenced by the Ancient Greek: καθαρός, 'pure'. These forms are in use as a given name in the language noted, or were formerly. The list includes short or pet forms (hypocorisms), associated with Katherine or one of its variants:

- Αἰκατερίνη (Ancient Greek)
- Aikaterine (Old French)
- Cadi (Welsh)
- Cáit (Irish)
- Caitlín (Irish)
- Caitlyn or Caitlin (English)
- Caitria (Irish)
- Caitrín (Irish)
- Caitríona (Irish)
- Caja (Danish)
- Catherine, Katarina, Katherine, Katerina (Indonesian)
- Cajsa (Swedish)
- Caren (Welsh)
- Carin (English)
- Carina (Portuguese)
- Carine (French; Karien in Afrikaans)
- Caryn (English)
- Cat (English)
- Cát Linh (Vietnamese)
- Cătălina (Romanian)
- Catalina (Italian, Spanish)
- Catant (French)
- Catarina (Galician, Italian, Portuguese, Spanish, Neapolitan)
- Cate (English)
- Cateline (Old French)
- Cathelijne (Dutch)
- Cateliña (Galician)
- Caterina (Catalan, Italian, Romanian)
- Caterine (Old French)
- Cathanne (English, French)
- Cathareau (French)
- Catharina (Dutch, Swedish)
- Catharine (English)
- Catherin (English)
- Catherina (Spanish)
- Catherine (English, French)
- Catherne (17th century English)
- Cathey (Nordic)
- Cathie (English)
- Cathleen (English, Hiberno-English)
- Cathrin (German)
- Cathrine (Scandinavian)
  - Cathrinus (Latinized, male)
- Cathryn (English)
- Cathy (English)
- Cati (Italian)
- Catia (Italian)
- Cátia (Portuguese)
- Catie (English)
- Catina (Romanian)
- Catinca (Romanian)
- Catja (Danish)
- Catlin (Middle English)
- Cato (Dutch)
- Catraoine (Irish)
- Catreena (Manx)
- Catreeney (Manx)
- Catrien (Dutch)
- Catrin (German, Welsh)
- Catrina (Romanian)
- Catrine (Swedish)
- Catrinel (Romanian)
- Catrìona (Scottish Gaelic)
- Catterina (Italian)
- Catuxa (Galician)
- Caty (Italian)
- Ecaterina (Romanian)
- Eka: Georgian: ეკა
- Ekaterina: Екатерина (Bulgarian, Macedonian)
- Ekaterina, or Jekaterina, Yekaterina: Russian: Екатерина
- Ekaterina (Latvian)
- Ekaterine: Georgian: ეკატერინე
- Gaa Fu Lin: 嘉芙蓮 (Hong Kong Cantonese)
- Gadara: (Armenian: Գադարա)
- Gadarine: (Armenian: Կատարինէ)
- Gáhteriinná (Sami)
- Gáre (Sami)
- Gáren (Sami)
- Jekaterina (Estonian)
- Kaarat (Greenlandic)
- Kaarin (Estonian)
- Kaarina (Finnish)
- Kaatje (Dutch)
- Kaća (Serbian)
- Kaciaryna: (Belarusian: Кацярына)
- Kadara: (Armenian: Կատարա)
- Kadarine: (Armenian: Կատարինէ)
- Kadi (Estonian)
- Kadri (Estonian)
- Kaety (English)
- Káhtariinná (Sami)
- Kai (Estonian, Swedish)
- Kaia (Estonian, Norwegian)
- Kaie (Estonian)
- Kaight (English)
- Kaija (Finnish)
- Kaila (English)
- Kailan (English)
- Kailani (Hawaiian)
- Kaili (Estonian)
- Kailie (English, French)
- Kailua (Hawaiian)
- Kelavra: Greek: Καιλαύρα, Arabic: كلارا. (Also German)
- Kena: Greek: Καινά, Arabic: كائنا. (Also English)
- Kera: Greek: Καίρα; Arabic: كيرا
- Keri, Kerry: Greek: Καίρη; Arabic: كيري; Japanese: カイリ. (Also Hawaiian)
- Keria: Greek: Καίρια. (Also Arabic)
- Kairi or Kairia (Arabic, Estonian, Greek, Japanese)
- Kaisa (Estonian, Finnish)
- Kai Sa Lin: 凱薩琳 (traditional Chinese)
  - Kai Se Lin: Chinese: 凯瑟琳 (simplified Chinese)
- Kaisu (Finnish)
- Kait (English)
- Kaitlan (English)
- Kaitlane (English)
- Kaitlin (English)
- Kaitline (English)
- Kaitlyn (English)
- Kaitlynne (English)
- Kaitrin (German, Swedish)
- Kaitrina (Dutch, English, German, Swedish)
- Kaity (English)
- Kaj (Swedish, male)
- Kaja (Scandinavian, Estonian, Polish)
- Kajsa (Swedish)
- Kakalina (Hawaiian)
- Kalena (Hawaiian)
- Kaley (English)
- Kalina (Hawaiian)
- Kalindra (Portuguese, Spanish)
- Katerina (Albanian)
- Kateryna: Ukrainian: Катерина
- Kara (Arabic, English, Greek: Κάρα, Japanese)
- Káre (Sami)
- Káren (Sami)
- Karen: derived from the Danish short form of Katherine (Danish, English, German, Norwegian, Dutch)
- Karena (English)
- Karenina (English, Scandinavian, Russian)
- Karentina (English, Scandinavian, Russian)
- Kari (Norwegian)
- Karia (Norwegian)
- Karien (Afrikaans, Dutch, Carine in French)
- Kariinná (Sami)
- Karin (Afrikaans, Dutch, Estonian, Faroese, Finnish, German, Swedish)
- Karina (Swedish, Russian, English, Spanish)
- Karine (Կարինե Armenian; French)
- Karolina (English, Spanish, German, Italian, Norwegian, Swedish, Danish, Polish, Russian)
- Karoline (English, French, German)
- Karoun (Arabic, Armenian)
- Kary (Norwegian)
- Karyn (English)
- Karyna (English, Polish, Ukrainian, Belarusian)
- Kasari: Japanese: 笠利
- Kasia: Belarusian: Кася
- Kat (English)
- Kata (Croatian, Finnish, Hungarian)
- Katalin (Basque, Hungarian)
- Katalina (Basque, Esperanto, Hungarian)
- Katariina (Estonian, Finnish)
- Katarin (Basque, Breton)
- Katarína (Slovak)
- Katarina (Bosnian, Croatian, Esperanto, German, Hungarian, Macedonian, Serbian, Slovene, Swedish)
- Katarine (German)
- Katarino (Esperanto)
- Katarzyna (Polish)
  - Kasia (Polish)
  - Kasieńka (Polish)
  - Kaśka (Polish)
- Kate (Croatian, English)
- Katelijn (Dutch)
- Katelijne (Dutch)
- Katelin (English)
- Kateline (Middle English)
- Katell (Breton)
- Katelyn (English)
- Katelynn (English)
- Katelynne (English)
- Katen (Dutch)
- Katenka (Russian)
- Kateri (Mohawk)
- Katerien (Afrikaans, Dutch)
- Katerine (Old French)
- Keti: Greek: Καίτη
- Kety: Greek: Καίτυ
- Katia (Italian)
- Kátia (Portuguese)
- Katia: Greek: Κάτια
- Kateřina (Czech)
- Katerina (Greek: Κατερίνα; Albanian, Bulgarian, Latin, Macedonian, Russian)
- Katerine (Middle English)
- Katerino (Esperanto)
- Kateryna (Ukrainian)
- Katerynka (Ukrainian)
- Katey (English)
- Kathalavra: Greek: Καθαλαύρα. (Also German)
- Kathandra: Greek: Καθάνδρα (portmanteau of the names Katherine and Cassandra)
- Kathandrea: Greek: Καθανδρέα
- Kathani (Hindi, Arabic)
- Kathanna (English, German)
- Kathanne (English, French)
- Kathareau (French)
- Katharina (German, Latin)
- Katharine (English, German, Dutch)
- Katharsia: Greek: Καθαρσία
- Käthe (German)
- Kathelijne (Dutch)
- Katherina (English, German)
- Katherne (17th century English)
- Katheryn (English)
- Katheryne (English)
- Kathey (Gaelic)
- Kathi (English)
- Kathie (English)
- Kathianna (English)
- Kathianne (English)
- Kathlaura (English, German)
- Kathlauren (English, German)
- Kathlaurie (English, French, German)
- Kathleanna (English, German)
- Kathleanne (English, French)
- Kathleen (English, Hiberno-English)
- Kathlyn (English)
- Kathreena (Malayalam)
- Kathrina (German)
- Kathrin (German)
- Kathru (Malayalam)
- Kathryn (English)
- Kathy (English)
- Kati (Estonian, Finnish, Hungarian)
- Katya, Katia, Katja: Russian: Катя; Ukrainian: Кейт
- Katica (Croatian, Czech, Serbian, Slovene, Hungarian)
- Katie (English)
- Katika (Danish)
- Katina: Greek: Κατίνα
- Κatina, Katinja (Esperanto)
- Katinka (Afrikaans, German, Hungarian, Russian)
- Katixa (Basque)
- Katja (Croatian, Dutch, Finnish, German, Russian, Slovene, Ukrainian)
- Katka (Czech, Russian)
- Káťa (Czech)
- Kačka (Czech)
- Kačenka (Czech)
- Katlyn (English)
- Kätlin (Estonian)
- Kato: Georgian: კატო
- Kató (Hungarian)
- Katóka (Hungarian)
- Katre (Estonian)
- Katri (Finnish)
- Katrian (Afrikaans, Dutch, Flemish Dutch)
- Katriana (Portuguese, Spanish)
- Katrianna (Danish, Dutch, English, German, Norwegian, Swedish)
- Katrianne (English, French)
- Katrien (Afrikaans, Dutch, Flemish Dutch)
- Katriin (Estonian)
- Katriina (Finnish)
- Katrijn (Dutch, also 'Katryn' in Afrikaans and German)
- Katriona (English)
- Katrin (Estonian, Faroese, German, Swedish)
- Katrina (English, German, Dutch)
- Katrīna (Latvian)
- Katrine (Bulgarian: Катрин; Dutch, French, Scottish Gaelic, Scandinavian)
- Katrinka (Dutch, German, Russian)
- Katrusia (Ukrainian)
- Katryn (Afrikaans, German, spelt in Dutch: Katrijn)
- Katushka (Russian)
- Katuška (Czech)
- Katy (English)
- Katya (Russian, Bulgarian, Ukrainian)
- Kay (English)
- Kaye (English)
- Kerry (Hiberno-English)
- Keta: Georgian: ქეთა
- Ketevan: Georgian: ქეთევან
- Keti: Georgian: ქეთი
- Ketlen
- Ketlin (Estonian)
- Keto: ქეთო (Georgian)
- Ketrina (Albanian)
- Kitty (English)
- Koto (Hungarian)
- Kotryna (Lithuanian)
- Kyla (English)
- Kylie (English)
- Kysa (Finnish)
- Nienke (Dutch)
- Nynke (Frisian)
- Reina (Japanese, Yiddish)
- Riin (Estonian)
- Riina (Estonian, Finnish)
- Rina (Croatian)
- Triin (Estonian)
- Triinu (Estonian)
- Trijn (Dutch)
- Trijntje (Dutch)
- Trina (German)
- Trinchen (German)
- Trine (Danish, German)
- Trīne (Latvian)
- Trinette (French)
- Tríona (Irish)

== See also ==
- St. Catherine (disambiguation)
