= Katarina (given name) =

- Pronunciation: Kat-a-ree-na
- Gender: Female

Origin
- Origin: Greek
- Meaning: Pure

Other names
- Alternative spelling: Cyrillic: Катарина, Катаріна
- Variant form: Katharina
- Nicknames: Kata (Ката), Kaja
- Related names: Catarina
- See also: Katerina, Katherine, Katrina

Katarina (Cyrillic: Катарина) is a feminine given name. It is the standard Slovak, Croatian, Serbian, Swedish, and Slovenian form of Katherine, and a variant spelling in several other languages.

In Croatia, it is the fourth most common female given name, or third if combined with the short form Kata. Historically in Croatia, the name Katarina has been among the most common feminine given names in the decades up to 1939, and then again between 1990 and 1999. In Serbia it is within the 10 most popular names for girls born since 1991.

== Notable people ==
=== Acting ===
- Katarina Čas (born 1976), Slovenian actress
- Katarina Cohen (born 1975), Swedish actress
- Katarina Ewerlöf (born 1959), Swedish actress
- Katarina Radivojević (born 1979), Serbian actress
- Katarina Taikon (1932–1995), Swedish actress and writer
- Katarina Van Derham (born 1975), Slovak-American actress and model
- Katarina Žutić (born 1972), Serbian actress

=== Nobility ===
- Katarina Branković (1418–1492), Countess of Celje as the wife of Count Ulrich II
- Katarina Eriksdotter (12th century), daughter of the Swedish king Eric the Saint
- Katarina Ingesdotter (12th century), daughter of the Swedish king Inge the Elder
- Katarina Kosača (1424/1425–1478), Queen of Bosnia as the wife of King Stephen Thomas, the penultimate Bosnian sovereign
- Katarina Konstantinović (1848–1910), Serbian noblewoman of the Obrenović dynasty
- Katarina Stenbock (1535–1621), third and last consort of Gustav I of Sweden and the Queen of Sweden
- Katarina Šubić (14th century), Duchess of Legnica-Brzeg as the wife of Bolesław III the Generous
- Katarina Sunesdotter (1215–1252), consort of Erik Eriksson and the Queen of Sweden
- Katarina of Yugoslavia (born 1959), granddaughter of King Alexander I of Yugoslavia
- Katarina Zrinska (1625–1673), Croatian noblewoman and poetess

=== Politics ===
- Katarina Barley (born 1968), German politician
- Katarina Berggren (born 1968), Swedish politician
- Katarina Bosetti-Kristoffersson (born 1979), Swedish politician
- Katarina Brännström (born 1950), Swedish politician
- Katarina Kresal (born 1973), Slovenian politician
- Katarina Kruhonja (born 1949), Croatian peace activist
- Katarina Köhler (born 1954), Swedish politician
- Katarina Luhr (born 1973), Swedish politician
- Katarina Milovuk (1844–1913), Serbian women's rights activist
- Katarina Peović (born 1974), Croatian politician
- Katarina Stensson (born 1988), Swedish politician
- Katarina Stenström Ros (born 1966), Swedish politician
- Katarina Tolgfors (born 1967), Swedish politician
- Katarina Tomasevski (1953–2006), Croatian politician and lawyer

=== Sports ===
- Katarina Allberg (born 1971), Swedish-Canadian orienteer
- Katarina Arfwidsson (born 1973), Swedish handball player
- Katarina Bartholdson (born 1941), Swedish tennis player
- Katarina Blagojević (1943–2021), Serbian chess player
- Katarina Bulatović (born 1984), Montenegrin handball player
- Katarina Comesaña (born 1992), Peruvian football player
- Katarina DelCamp (born 2004), American-Turkish figure skater
- Katarina Đorđević (born 1995), Serbian footballer
- Katarina Džaferović (born 2002), Montenegrin handball player
- Katarina Gadnik (born 1998), Slovenian football player
- Katarina Gerboldt (born 1989), Russian figure skater
- Katarina Ježić (born 1992), Croatian handball player
- Katarina Johnson-Thompson (born 1993), English track and field athlete
- Katarina Jokić (born 1998), Serbian tennis player
- Katarina Jukic (born 1989), Australian football player
- Katarina Kolar (born 1989), Croatian football player
- Katarina Kowplos (born 2001), Australian sports shooter
- Katarina Krišto (born 2002), Croatian judoka
- Katarina Krpež Šlezak (born 1988), Serbian handball player
- Katarina Lavtar (born 1988), Slovenian alpine skier
- Katarina Lässker (born 1963), Swedish curler
- Katarina Lazić (born 1980), Serbian basketball player
- Katarina Lazović (born 1999), Serbian volleyball player
- Katarina Luketić (born 1998), Croatian volleyball player
- Katarina Mišić (born 1976), Serbian tennis player
- Katarina Naumanen (born 1995), Finnish footballer
- Katarina Nyberg (born 1965), Swedish curler
- Katarina Pandza (born 2002), Austrian-Croatian handball player
- Katarina Pavlović (born 1995), Croatian handball player
- Katarina Pranješ (born 2002), Croatian football player
- Katarina Roxon (born 1993), Canadian swimmer
- Katarina Sederholm (born 1968), Finnish-Norwegian shot putter and weightlifter
- Katarina Simonović (born 1994), Serbian swimmer
- Katarina Srebotnik (born 1981), Slovenian professional tennis player
- Katarina Stalin (born 2009), Indonesian-American footballer
- Katarina Strožová (born 1986), Slovak football player
- Katarina Timglas (born 1985), Swedish ice hockey player
- Katarina Tomašević (born 1984), Serbian handball player
- Katarina Vukomanović (born 1990), Serbian volleyball player
- Katarina Waters (born 1980), English professional wrestler
- Katarina Witt (born 1965), German figure skater
- Katarina Wolfkostin (born 2004), American ice dancer
- Katarina Zajc (born 1967), Slovenian alpine skier
- Katarina Zavatska (born 2000), Ukrainian tennis player

=== Other fields ===
- Katarina Adanja (1921–1989), Serbian art historian
- Katarina Asplund (1690–1758), Finnish pietist
- Katarina Barruk (born 1994), Swedish singer
- Katarina Benzova (born 1987), Slovak photographer
- Katarina Bogdanović (1885–1969), Serbian philosopher
- Katarina Bogićević (born 1998), Montenegrin singer
- Katarina Carroll (born 1963), Australian police officer
- Katarina Cicak (born 1973), Bosnian physicist
- Katarina Durica (born 1983), Hungarian author
- Katarina Erlandsdotter (1771–1848), Swedish artist
- Katarina Frostenson (born 1953), Swedish writer
- Katarina Grujić (born 1992), Serbian singer
- Katarina Gylta (1520–1593), Swedish Bridgettine nun
- Katarina Hultling (born 1954), Swedish journalist
- Katarina Ivanović (1811–1882), Serbian artist
- Katarina Ivanovska (born 1988), Macedonian model
- Katarina Jakobsson (1950–1979), Swedish murder victim
- Katarina Jovanović (1869–1954), Serbian author
- Katarina Juselius (born 1943), Finnish economist
- Katarina Karnéus (born 1965), Swedish opera singer
- Katarina Löfström (born 1970), Swedish artist
- Katarina Matanović-Kulenović (1913–2003), Croatian aviator
- Katarina Mazetti (1944–2025), Swedish journalist
- Katarina Pejak (born 1993), Serbian musician
- Katarina Rodriguez (born 1992), Filipino beauty queen
- Katarina Sandström (born 1974), Swedish journalist
- Katarina Svanberg (born 1944), Swedish scientist
- Katarina Wennstam (born 1973), Swedish journalist
- Katarina Kuini Whare-rau-aruhe Te Tau (1899–1998), New Zealand tribal leader
- Katarina Živković (born 1989), Serbian singer
- Katarina Zupančič (1860–1918), Slovenian straw plaiter and singer

== Fictional characters ==
- Katarina, a character in the television series Doctor Who
- Katarina Alves, a character in the video game series Tekken
- Katarina, a character in the anime Sailor Moon
- Katarina Cott, a character in the video game Suikoden IV
- Katarina de Leon, a character in the video game Pirates: The Legend of Black Kat
- Katarina du Couteau, a character in the video game League of Legends
- Katarina Claes, a character in the light novel My Next Life as a Villainess: All Routes Lead to Doom!
- Katarina, a character in the video game Conduit 2

== See also ==
- Katharina
- List of storms named Katrina
