= Kaido (given name) =

Male given name

- Gender: Male
- Languages: Estonian, Finnish
- Name day: 3 November (Estonia)

Origin
- Region of origin: Estonia Finland

Other names
- Related names: Kaimar

Kaido is an Estonian and Finnish given name, a masculine form of Kaidi – a variant of Katariina.

People named Kaido include:

- Kaido Höövelson (Baruto Kaito; born 1984), sumo wrestler
- Kaido Kaaberma (born 1968), fencer
- Kaido Kalm (born 1965), ice sledge hockey player and Paralympic competitor
- Kaido Kama (born 1957), politician
- Kaido Kreen (born 1965), volleyball player
- Kaido Külaots (born 1976), chess Grandmaster
- Kaido Ole (born 1963), painter
- Kaido Põldma (born 1980), musician (Soul Militia)
- Kaido Reivelt (born 1970), physicist, researcher and educator
- Kaido Saks (born 1986), basketball player
- Kaido Veermäe (born 1971), actor

== See also ==
- Kaidō
