= Katharina =

- Gender: Female

Other names
- Related names: Katherine, Catherine

Katharina is a feminine given name. It is a German form of Katherine. Notable people with this name include:

== Television and film ==
- Katharina Bellowitsch, Austrian radio and TV presenter
- Katharina Mückstein, Austrian film director
- Katharina Thalbach, German actress and film director
- Katherine Pierce, a character in The Vampire Diaries originally named Katharina Petrova
- Katharina Stark, German actress

== Arts ==
- Katharina Bergobzoomová (1755–1788), Czech opera singer
- Katharina Fröhlich (1800–1879), Austrian lover of Franz Grillparzer, patron of artists and writers
- Katharina Rapp (born 1948), German artist
- Katja Oxman (born 1942), born Katharina Protassowsky, German-born American visual artist

== Alpine skiers ==
- Katharina Gallhuber, Austrian alpine skier
- Katharina Huber, Austrian alpine skier
- Katharina Liensberger, Austrian alpine skier
- Katharina Truppe, Austrian alpine skier

== Politics ==
- Katharina Graf (1873–1936), Austrian politician of the Social Democratic Workers Party of Austria (SAI)
- Katharina Jensen (born 1986), German politician
- Katharina Kohl (born 1992), German politician
- Katharina Kucharowits (born 1983), Austrian politician
- Katharina Schuler (born 1986), German politician
- Katharina Senge (born 1982), German politician
- Katharina Slanina (born 1977), German politician

== Other ==
- Katharina Baunach, German footballer
- Katharina Dalton, British physician and pioneer in the research of premenstrual stress syndrome
- Katharina Klafsky, Hungarian operatic singer
- Katharina von Bora, German Catholic nun who was an early convert to Protestantism
- Katharina Franziska von Wattenwyl (1645–1714), Swiss spy
- Katharina von Zimmern (1478–1547), Swiss last abbess of the Fraumünster Abbey

== See also ==
- 320 Katharina, small Main belt asteroid
- Katharina, a genus of chiton mollusc in the family Mopaliidae
- The Lost Honour of Katharina Blum, 1974 novel by Heinrich Böll
- Catherina (and similar spellings)
