= Katarina =

Katarina most commonly refers to:

- Katarina (given name), a feminine given name

Katarina may also refer to:

- Katarina nad Medvodami, former name of Topol pri Medvodah, a settlement in Slovenia
- Katarina (Doctor Who), a character in the television series, Doctor Who
- Katarina Parish, a parish in central Stockholm
- Katarina Church, a church building in Stockholm, Sweden
- Katarina Elevator, an elevator in Stockholm, Sweden
- MV Katarina, a restaurant ship and former steam ship in Turku, Finland

== See also ==
- Katariina (disambiguation)
- Katharina (disambiguation)
- Catherina, and similar spellings
