= Kätlin =

Female given name

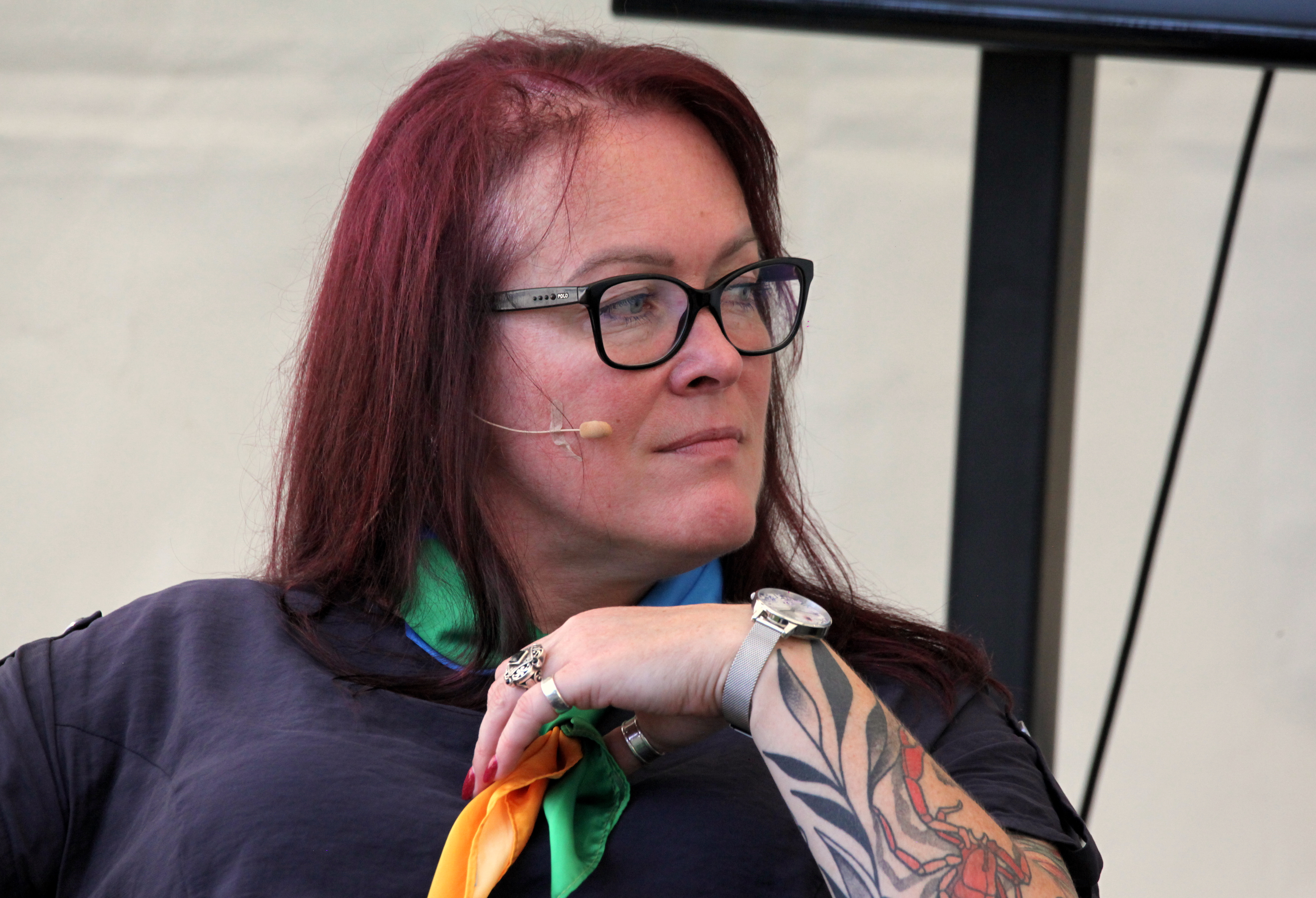
- Kätlin Alvela
- Gender: Female
- Language: Estonian
- Name day: November 25

Origin
- Region of origin: Estonia

Other names
- Derived: Katherine
- Related names: Katrin, Katariina, Ketlin

Kätlin is an Estonian feminine given name. It's a variant of Katherine.

Notable people who share the given name Kätlin include:

- Kätlin Aas (born 1992), Estonian fashion model
- Kätlin Kaldmaa (born 1970), Estonian freelance writer, poet, translator and literary critic
- Kätlin Konstabel (born 1974), Estonian psychologist
- Kätlin Piirimäe (born 1995), Estonian shot putter and discus thrower
- Kätlin Sepp (born 1992), Estonian swimmer
- Kätlin Tammiste (born 1996), Estonian sailor
- Kätlin Valdmets (born 1988), Estonian beauty queen
- Kätlin Vainola (born 1978), Estonian children's author and poet
