= Catalina (name) =

Katalena
- Gender: Feminine

Origin
- Origin: Spanish
- Meaning: pure

Other names
- Nickname: Kat
- Related names: Katherine, Kathryn, Cathryn, Catherine, Caitlin, Ceitlin, Kaitlin, Caitlyn, Kathleen, Cathleen, Kaitlyn, Catelin, Catelyn, Caitlynn, Catelynn, Caetlynn, Katelyn, Katelynn, Kaitlynn

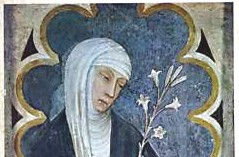

Catalina is a feminine given name. It is a Spanish form of a variation of the name Katherine. Catalina is an equivalent to Katherine or Catherine in English, Αικατερίνη (Ekaterini) and Κατερίνα (Katerina) in Greek, Катерина (Kateryna) in Ukraine, Екатерина (Yekaterina) and Катюша (Katyusha) in Russian, Caterina in Catalan and Italian, Cătălina in Romanian, Catherine in French, Katarzyna in Polish, and Catarina in Portuguese and Galician.

== People ==
People with the name Catalina include:

- Catalina Aurora García Corria, "La Catalina", Chilean wrestler
- Catalina, Duchess of Villena (1403–1439), Infanta of Aragon
- Catalina Micaela of Spain (1567-1597), Duchess consort of Savoy
- Catalina Artusi (born 1990), Argentine actress
- Catalina Berroa (1849–1911), Cuban musician
- Catalina Botero Marino (born 1965), Colombian attorney
- Catalina Castaño (born 1979), Colombian tennis player
- Cătălina Cristea (born 1975), Romanian tennis player
- Catalina Denis, Colombian actress
- Catalina de Erauso (1592–1650), Spanish explorer
- Catalina D'Erzel (1897–1950), Mexican journalist, playwright, novelist and poet
- Cătălina Gheorghițoaia (born 1975), Romanian fencer
- Catalina Guirado (born 1974), British-New Zealander model and TV star
- Catalina of Motril (fl. 1501–1531), enslaved Muslim bedchamber servant of Catherine of Aragon during her marriage to Henry VIII
- Catalina Neri (born 2011), Argentinian rhythmic gymnast
- Catalina Parot (born 1956), Chilean politician
- Catalina Peláez (born 1991), Colombian squash player
- Cătălina Ponor (born 1987), Romanian artistic gymnast
- Catalina de los Ríos y Lisperguer (1604–1665), Chilean murderer
- Catalina Robayo (born 1989), Colombian beauty queen
- Catalina Rosales, Mexican paralympic athlete
- Catalina Saavedra (born 1968), Chilean actress
- Catalina Sandino Moreno (born 1981), Colombian actress
- Catalina Sarsfield, French-born Irish Jacobite of the 18th century
- Catalina Speroni (1938–2010), Argentine actress
- Catalina Thomás (1533–1574), Spanish saint
- Catalina Trail (born 1949), Mexican naturalist
- Catalina Usme (born 1989), Colombian football player
- Catalina Vallejos (born 1989), Chilean model
- Catalina Vasquez Villalpando (born 1940), American politician
- Catalina Yue, Canadian musician
