= Ďurica =

Ďurica (feminine: Ďuricová) is a Slovak surname. Notable people with the surname include:

- Ján Ďurica (born 1981), Slovak footballer
- Martin Ďurica (born 1981), Slovak footballer
- Milan Stanislav Ďurica (1925–2024), Slovak historian and theologian
- Pavol Ďurica (born 1983), Slovak footballer
- Peter Ďurica (born 1986), Slovak footballer
- Tomáš Ďurica (born 1979), Slovak footballer

== See also ==
- Katarina Durica (born 1983), Slovak-Hungarian writer
