= Catherina =

Catherina is a feminine given name. Notable people with the name include:

- Dona Catherina of Kandy (died 1613), ruling Queen of Kandy in 1581
- Catherina Boevey (1669–1726), English philanthropist
- Catherina "Kitty" Wilhelmina Geisow (1876-1958), New Zealand painter
- Catherina Cibbini-Kozeluch, (1785–1858), Austrian pianist and composer
- Catherina Heß (born 1985), German actress
- Catherina McKiernan (born 1969), Irish long-distance runner
- Catherina van Holland (c. 1280–1328), bastard child of Floris V, Count of Holland

== See also ==
- Catarina (disambiguation)
- Catharina (disambiguation)
- Catharine (disambiguation)
- Catherine (disambiguation)
- Catrina (disambiguation)
- Catrine
- Catriona
- Katarina (disambiguation)
- Katarzyna
- Katharina
- Katharine
- Katherina (disambiguation)
- Katherine
- Katrina (disambiguation)
- Katryna
- Cate
- Cathy (disambiguation)
- Kate (disambiguation)
- Kasia (disambiguation)
- Kathy
- Katy (disambiguation)
- Kaja
