= Katyusha =

Katyusha (Russian: Катю́ша) is a diminutive of the Russian name Ekaterina or Yekaterina, the Russian form of Katherine or Catherine.

Katyusha or Katusha may refer to:

== Military use ==
- Katyusha rocket launcher, Soviet rocket launcher of World War II, named after the song
- Tupolev SB, a Soviet medium bomber of World War II
- Soviet K-class submarine, nicknamed Katyusha

== Other uses ==
- Katyusha (moth), a synonym of the moth genus Lygephila in the family Erebidae
- Katyusha (song), a Russian wartime song about a girl longing for her beloved
- Team Katusha, a Swiss professional cycling team
- Katusha Demidova, a Russian ballroom dancer
- 1900 Katyusha, an asteroid
- Katyusha, a character in the Japanese anime franchise Girls und Panzer, named after the song.

== See also ==
- Katyusha's Song
