= Theotokos Uralskaya =

Russian Orthodox Marian icon

Theotokos Uralskaya (Our Lady of Urals) is the Russian Orthodox Marian icon locally venerated in Ekaterinburg and Urals.

According to Ekaterinburg Eparchy, the image of the icon appeared on January 9, 2003, in a dream of a parishioner named Ekaterina (no further information is given about her). The image "became live" and told the woman that Virgin Mary "protects Ural Land" and instructed her to tell people about that and to ask for painting of the icon. She told it to clergy of a local church dedicated to Seraphim of Sarov who supported the idea and later it was approved by Eparchy leader of that time, Vikentiy, who organized the painting and consecration of the image. Later it was also supported by visiting major Moscow clergy from Holy Synod of the Russian Orthodox Church.

The painting was accomplished by an unnamed icon painter in 9 months. The icon is a classical Hodegetria type icon that Russian church also classifies as Kazanskaya-type. There are Virgin Mary and Baby Jesus, and distinctive features of the icon are fir-tree branch covered by snow and a snowflake.
