= Riina =

Riina may refer to:

- Salvatore Riina
- Charlie Riina
- Riina (given name)
