= Cait =

Cait or CAIT may refer to:

== People ==
- Cait Jenner (born 1949), American television personality and Olympic gold medal-winning decathlete
- Cait O'Riordan (born 1965), bass player for punk/folk band The Pogues from 1983 to 1986

== Other uses ==
- Cait Sith (Final Fantasy VII), a playable character in the Square role playing game Final Fantasy VII
- Cait, a character from Fallout 4
- Child abuse investigation team, United Kingdom police
- Climate Analysis Indicators Tool, by the World Resources Institute (WRI)
- Kingdom of Cait, a Pictish Kingdom in the Early Middle Ages

== See also ==
- Caitlin, a female given name
- Cate, a female given name
