= Catarina =

Catarina may refer to:

== People ==
- Catarina (given name)

== Places ==
- Catarina, Masaya in Nicaragua
- Catarina, San Marcos in Guatemala
- Catarina, Texas in the United States
- Santa Catarina Barahona in Guatemala
- Santa Catarina Ixtahuacan in Guatemala
- Santa Catarina Mita in Guatemala
- Santa Catarina Palopó in Guatemala
- Santa Catarina (Caldas da Rainha) in Portugal
- Santa Catarina (island) in Brazil
- Santa Catarina (state) in Brazil
- Santa Catarina, Cape Verde
- Santa Catarina, Nuevo León in Mexico

== Other uses ==
- Catarina or La Fille du Bandit, Jules Perrot's 1846 ballet
- Cyclone Catarina, a South Atlantic tropical cyclone
- Misión Santa Catarina Virgen y Mártir, a Spanish mission
- Santa Catarina (ship), a Portuguese carrack that was seized by the Dutch East India Company

== See also ==
- Catherina (and similar spellings)
