= Cicak =

Cicak is a surname. Notable people with the surname include:

- Katarina Cicak (born 1974), physicist
- Slavko Cicak (born 1969), Swedish chess player
- Želimir Altarac Čičak (1947–2021), Yugoslav-Bosnian rock promoter, poet, songwriter, music critic, and publicist
