= Ekaterini =

- Gender: Female

Origin
- Origin: Greek

Other names
- Variant form: Ekaterina
- Related names: Aikaterini
- See also: Katherine

Ekaterini or Aikaterini (Greek: Αικατερίνη, Aikaterínē) is a Greek feminine given name. It is an original Greek form of Katherine. Notable people with the name include:

- Princess Katherine of Greece and Denmark (1913-2007), originally Αικατερίνη, was the third daughter and youngest child of King Constantine I of Greece and Sophia of Prussia and Sister of King Paul of the Hellenes
- Katherine, Crown Princess of Yugoslavia, originally Αικατερίνη, is the wife of Alexander, Crown Prince of Yugoslavia
- Ekaterini Koffa (born 1969), Greek sprinter
- Katerina Nikolaidou (born 1992), Greek rower
- Ekaterini Pavlidou (born 1993), Greek chess player
- Katerina Stefanidi (born 1990), Greek pole vaulter
- Ekaterini Thanou (born 1975), Greek sprinter
- Ekaterini Voggoli (born 1970), Greek discus thrower
