= Kaarina (disambiguation) =

Kaarina may refer to:

- Kaarina, a small town and municipality of Finland
- Kaarina (name), a Finnish female given name
- 2257 Kaarina, a main-belt asteroid
- SS Kaarina (1938), a Finnish cargo ship in service 1954-68
