= Kaarina (name) =

Kaarina is a Finnish female given name. Its nameday is celebrated on 25 November. It reached its peak of popularity in the 1940s and 1950s. As of 2013 there were 132,000 women registered with this name in Finland. It is listed by the Finnish Population Register Centre as one of the top 10 most popular female given names ever.

== Origin and variants ==
It originated as the Finnish form of Katherine. Variants include Katariina, Katri, Kaija, Kaisa and Katja.

== Notable people ==
Notable people with this name include:

- Kaarina Aalto (1920–1994), Finnish physician and politician
- Kaarina Goldberg, Finnish author
- Kaarina Immonen, Finnish politician
- Kaarina Multiala (died before 1571), Finnish merchant
- Kaarina Suonio (born 1941), Finnish retired politician and psychologist
