= Jekaterina =

Feminine given name

Jekaterina is a given name, a variant of Ekaterina and Yekatarina and a cognate of Katherine. Notable people with the given name include:

- Jekaterina Golovatenko (born 1979), Estonian figure skater
- Jekaterina Patjuk (born 1983), Estonian athlete
