= Trdina =

Trdina is a surname. Notable people with the surname include:

- Janez Trdina (1830–1905), Slovenian writer and historian
- Tadej Trdina (born 1988), Slovenian footballer

== See also ==
- Trina (name)
