= Trena =

Trena is a given name. Notable people with the name include:

- Trena Cox (1895–1980), English artist
- Trena King (born 1958), American archer
- Trena Trice-Hill (born 1965), American basketball player

== See also ==
- Trina (name)
