= Kathryn =

- Gender: Female

Origin
- Meaning: "Pure"

Other names
- Related names: Catherine, Katherine

Kathryn is a feminine given name and comes from the Greek meaning for 'pure'. It is a variant of Katherine. It may refer to:

In television and film:

- Kathryn Beaumont (born 1938), English voice actress and school teacher best known for her Disney animation film works
- Kathryn Bernardo (born 1996), Filipina actress and recording artist
- Kathryn Bigelow (born 1951), American film director, first woman to win the Academy Award, BAFTA, and DGA award for Best Director
- Kathryn Busby, American television and film executive
- Kathryn Cressida also known as "Kat" Cressida (born 1968), American voice actress
- Kathryn Crosby (1933 – 2024), American actress and singer who performed her most memorable roles under her birth-name Kathryn Grant
- Kathryn Drysdale (born 1981), English actress
- Kathryn Eames (1908 – 2004), American screen, stage, and television actress
- Kathryn Erbe (born 1966), American actress best known for her lead role as Detective Eames on Law & Order: Criminal Intent
- Kathryn Grayson (1922 – 2010), American lead actress and operatic soprano singer with MGM and Warner Brothers
- Kathryn Hahn (born 1974), American actress best known for her role as Lily Lebowski on Crossing Jordan
- Kathryn Hess (born 1967), American mathematician
- Kathryn Joosten (1939 – 2012), American actress known for roles on The West Wing and Desperate Housewives
- Kathryn Kinley (born 1965), American television personality, journalist and musical theater actress
- Kathryn McGuire (1903 – 1978), American silent-film actress and dancer
- Kathryn Morris (born 1969), American actress best known for her lead role as Detective Lilly Rush on Cold Case
- Kathryn Leigh Scott (born 1943), American television and film actress known for her roles in the soap opera Dark Shadows

In science:

- Kathryn Albers, American professor of neurobiology and medicine
- Kathryn Paige Harden, American psychologist and behavior geneticist
- Kathryn P. Hire (born 1959), American astronaut with over 381 hours in space
- Kathryn Mann, mathematician
- Kathryn S. McKinley, American computer scientist
- Kathryn Dwyer Sullivan (born 1951), in 1984 became the first American woman to walk in space, and with 532 hours in space
- Kathryn C. Thornton (born 1952), American astronaut with over 975 hours in space

In music:

- Kathryn Calder, Canadian singer-songwriter and member of The New Pornographers
- Kathryn Dawn Lang (k.d. lang) (born 1961), Canadian musician, singer, and songwriter
- Kathryn Roberts, an English folk singer
- Kathryn Scott, Northern Irish singer
- Kathryn Bint, an English singer originally from Chicago, stage name One Little Plane
- Kathryn Tickell, (born 1967), English player of the Northumbrian smallpipes and fiddle

In literature:

- Kathryn Deans, Australian children's fantasy author
- Kathryn H. Kidd, American novelist
- Kathryn Hulme (1900 – 1981), American author best known for The Nun's Story
- Kathryn Johnson (1926 – 2019), American journalist
- Kathryn Schulz, American freelance writer and journalist
- Kathryn Stockett, American novelist
- Kathryn Tucker Windham (1918 – 2011), American storyteller, author, photographer and journalist

In politics:

- Kathryn I. Bowers (1943–2015), American politician and Democratic former member of the Tennessee Senate representing the 33rd district
- Kathryn Epton (1912–1998), American politician
- Kathryn Francis (died 2005), American politician
- Kathryn Garcia (born 1970), Commissioner of the New York City Sanitation Department
- Kathryn Joyce Gorriceta (born 1980), Filipino politician
- Kathryn E. Granahan née O'Hay (1894 – 1979), American Democratic U.S. Representative from Pennsylvania, 32nd Treasurer of the United States
- Kathryn Hay (born 1975), Tasmanian Labor politician and member of the Tasmanian House of Assembly in the electorate of Bass
- Kathryn Malstrom (1888–1961), American politician
- Kathryn O'Loughlin McCarthy née O'Loughlin (1894 – 1952), American Democratic politician and first female U.S. Representative from Kansas
- Kathryn Stone (born 1963), British politician
- Kathryn H. Stone (1906–1995), American politician from Virginia

In sports:

- Kathryn Ainsworth, Australian netballer
- Kathryn Binns later became Kathryn Davis (born 1958), English long-distance runner of marathons and half marathon events
- Kathryn Colin (born 1974), American Olympic contender and Pan American Games medalist in canoeing
- Kathryn Sandercock (born 2000), American softball player
- Kathryn Teasdale (1964–2016), Canadian auto racing driver
- Kathryn Westbeld (born 1996), American basketball player

In other fields:

- Kathryn Janeway, fictional Federation starship captain of the USS Voyager in Star Trek: Voyager and admiral in Star Trek: Nemesis
- Kathryn Morgan (born 1988), American ballet dancer
- Kathryn Parsons (born 1982), British tech entrepreneur
- Kathryn Shaw, Canadian theatre actor and director

Events

- Shooting of Kathryn Steinle, a 2015 incident in San Francisco

== See also ==
- Katherine
- Catherine
- Cathryn
- Lake Kathryn (disambiguation)
