= Ketlin =

Female given name

- Gender: Female
- Language: Estonian
- Name day: November 25

Origin
- Region of origin: Estonia

Other names
- Derived: Katherine
- Related names: Kätlin, Katrin

Ketlin is an Estonian feminine given name. It is a variant of Katherine.

Notable people who share the given name Ketlin include:

- Ketlin Priilinn (born 1982), Estonian writer
- Ketlin Saar (born 1997), Estonian footballer
- Ketlin Tekkel (born 1996), Estonian BMX rider
