= Catrina =

Catrina may refer to:

- Catrina (wrestler), American actress, model and professional wrestler
- Catherina (and similar spellings), variant forms of the given name
- Catrina River in Romania
- La Calavera Catrina, a 1913 zinc etching by Mexican engraver and printmaker José Guadalupe Posada

== See also ==
- Catriona
- Katrina (disambiguation)
