= Triin =

Female given name

- Gender: Female
- Language: Estonian
- Name day: 25 November

Origin
- Region of origin: Estonia

Other names
- Related names: Katherine, Katrin, Triinu, Trina

Triin is an Estonian feminine given name. Triinu is another version of Triin. It is a form of Katherine. It is likely that the name Triin derives from the North Germanic name Trina which was first documented in 1652, in Sweden. The name is common in Estonia, and may refer to any of the following persons:

- Triin Aljand (born 1985), Estonian swimmer
- Triin Narva (born 1994), Estonian chess player
- Triin Ojaste (born 1990), Estonian cross-country skier
- Triin Tenso (born 1987), Estonian actress
- Triin Tobi (born 1995), Estonian alpine skier
- Triin Vahisalu (born 1978), Estonian botanist
