= Catharine =

Catharine may refer to:

- Catharine (given name)

In geography:

- Catharine, New York
- St. Catharine, Missouri
- Saint Catharine, Kentucky
- Catharine, Kansas
- St. Catharines, Ontario

== See also ==
- Catharine Creek, New York
- Catherina (and similar spellings)
