= Katrina =

Katrina or Katrine may refer to:

== People ==
- Katrina (given name)
- Katrine (given name)
- Katrine (footballer), Brazilian footballer

== Places ==
- Katrine, Virginia, United States
- Lake Katrine, New York, United States
- Loch Katrine, a loch (lake) in Scotland

== Music and entertainment ==
- Katrina and the Waves, a pop rock band of the 1980s
- Katrina (1943 film), a Swedish film
- Katrina (1969 film), a South African drama film
- Katrina (novel), a 1936 Swedish novel by Sally Salminen
- Katrina (talk show), a 1967 Australian television talk show hosted by Katrina Pye that aired on ATV-0 in Melbourne
- Katrina, a webcomic from Red Giant Entertainment
- Katrine, best-selling 1909 novel by Elinor Macartney Lane

== Meteorology ==
- List of storms named Katrina
  - Hurricane Katrina, an exceptionally deadly and destructive Atlantic hurricane in 2005

== Other uses ==
- Katrina Cottage, a type of kit house
- Katrina cough, a respiratory illness
- USS Katrina (SP-1144), US Navy patrol vessel (1917–1919)
- USS Katrina Luckenbach (ID-3020), a US Navy transport vessel (1918–1919)
- Katrine, a theoretical founding ancestor of human mitochondrial DNA Haplogroup K

== See also ==
- Catrina (disambiguation)
- Katarina (disambiguation)
