= Trijn =

Trijn is a Dutch female given name, related to the French name Catherine. The diminutive is Trijntje. Notable people with the Dutch name include:

== People ==
- Trijn Jans, also known as Catrina Hoogsaet (1607-1685), Dutch Mennonite
- Trijn Janssens, real name of Lady Angelina (born 1972), Dutch musician
- Trijntje Keever (1616-1633), tallest female person
- Trijn van Leemput (1530–1607), Dutch heroine
- Trijntje Oosterhuis (1973), Dutch singer
- Trijn Rembrands (1557–1638), Dutch heroine
- Trijnie Rep (1950) Dutch speed-skater

== Fictional characters ==
- Trijn de Begijn, title character in the homonymous opera by Alphonse Olterdissen
