= Katariina =

Katariina may refer to:

- Katariina, Turku, a district of Turku, Finland
- Katariina (given name), a feminine given name
