= Ekaterine =

Ekaterine is a feminine given name which may refer to:

- Ekaterine Chavchavadze (1816–1882), Georgian princess, last ruling princess of the Principality of Mingrelia
- Ekaterine Gabashvili (1851–1938), Georgian writer, feminist and social reformer
- Keke Geladze ((1856/1858–1937), Georgian mother of Joseph Stalin
- Ekaterine Gorgodze (born 1991), Georgian tennis player
- Ekaterine Kherkheulidze (born 1972), Georgian politician
- Ekaterine Meiering-Mikadze (born 1967), Georgian diplomat, international relations expert and public policy consultant, former ambassador to several Middle Eastern countries
- Ekaterine Melikishvili (1854–1928), Georgian writer, translator, feminist and university dean
- Kato Svanidze (1885–1907), first wife of Joseph Stalin
- Ekaterine Tikaradze (born 1976), Georgian politician, former Minister of Internally Displaced Persons from the Occupied Territories of Georgia, Labor, Health and Social Affairs of Georgia
- Eka Tkeshelashvili (born 1977), Georgian jurist and former Minister of Justice and Minister of Foreign Affairs of Georgia
- Ekaterine Togonidze (born 1981), Georgian journalist and writer
- Eka Zguladze (born 1977), Georgian jurist and former First Deputy Minister of Internal Affairs

== See also ==
- Ekaterina
