= Women's Society of Belgrade =

Serbian women's rights organisation

- Београдско женско друштво
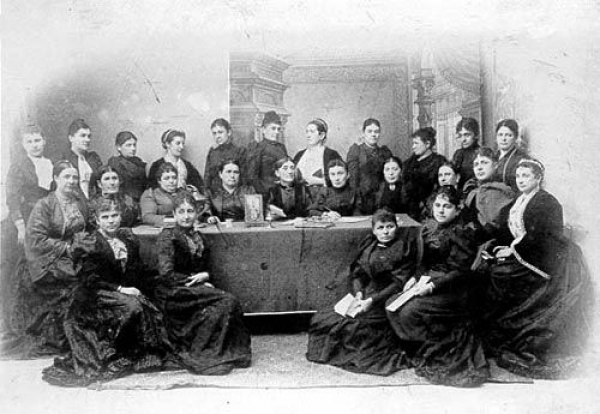
- Management of the Belgrade Women's Society, 1894
- Formation: 1875
- Founder: Katarina Milovuk
- Founded at: Principality of Serbia
- Dissolved: 1941; 85 years ago
- Type: NGO
- Headquarters: Belgrade
- Methods: Employment assistance, schooling, vocational education
- Official language: Serbian

The Women's Society of Belgrade (Београдско женско друштво, Beogradsko žensko društvo) was a Serbian women's rights organisation, founded in 1875 and active until 1941. Its purpose was to work for the emancipation of women as well as patriotic charity.

== History ==
The society was founded in 1875 by Katarina Milovuk.

The society was primarily focused on humanitarian issues such as helping poor women and children (particularly war orphans), but it combined it with women's issues. It supported women's emancipation and suffrage and included work shops, schooling and vocational training and employment agencies for women and girls, and founded the first women's magazine in Serbia.

It was to be the dominating women's organisation in Serbia until the establishment of the Circle of Serbian Sisters in 1903. After the second world war, both women's societies were replaced by the Women's Antifascist Front of Yugoslavia.

== See also ==
- Circle of Serbian Sisters
- Women's Antifascist Front of Yugoslavia
