= Caterina =

Name list

- Gender: Female

Other names
- Variant form: Catherina
- Related names: Katerina
- See also: Catarina, Catherine

Caterina is a feminine given name which is an Italian form of the name Katherine. Notable people with the name include:

== Music ==
- Caterina Assandra, Italian composer and Benedictine nun
- Caterina Bueno, Italian singer and folk music historian
- Caterina Caselli, Italian singer and music producer
- Caterina Cavalieri, Austrian soprano
- Caterina Jarboro, pioneering African American opera singer
- Caterina Mete, Australian children's entertainer, The Wiggles
- Caterina Valente, French-born singer and dancer

== Acting ==
- Caterina Murino, Italian actress
- Caterina Scorsone, Canadian actress

== Sports ==
- Kateřina Baďurová, Czech pole vaulter
- Kateryna Bondarenko, Ukrainian tennis player

== Other fields ==
- Caterina Appiani, lady of Piombino
- Caterina Consani, Italian mathematician
- Caterina dei Virgi, aristocratic Bolognese woman raised in the court of Bologna
- Caterina Fake, American businesswoman and entrepreneur
- Caterina "Hornet" Grimani, character in Cornelia Funke's novel The Thief Lord
- Caterina Mieras, teacher at the Teacher Training School of the Balearic Islands
- Caterina Sforza, countess of Forlì

== Songs about people named Caterina ==
- "Caterina" by Perry Como, 1962
- "Aman Caterina mou" by Haris Alexiou
- "Caterina Caterinaki" by Michalis Rakintzis
- "Pame gia ypno Caterina" by Giannis Poulopoulos
- "Vgainei i Caterina" by Aliki Vougiouklaki and Lavrentis Dianellos
- "Aummo Aummo" by Renzo Arbore
