= Triona =

Triona is a shortened form of the given name Catriona.

Notable people named Triona include:

- Triona (singer) (born 1995), Northern Irish singer-songwriter
- Triona Holden, British artist, writer and presenter
- Tríona Ní Dhomhnaill, Irish singer, pianist and composer
