= Kaidi =

- Gender: female
- Language: Estonian
- Name day: 14 October (Estonia)

Origin
- Region of origin: Estonia

Other names
- Related names: Kaido

Kaidi is an Estonian given name, a variant of Katariina. Notable people named Kaidi include:

- Kaidi Jekimova, Estonian footballer
- Kaidi Kivioja, Estonian triathlete

== See also ==
- Kaidi Finland, Finnish energy company subsidiary
