= Cathrinus =

- Gender: Male

Origin
- Origin: Latinized Greek
- Meaning: From the Greek feminine name Αἰκατερίνη Aikaterínē etymology is "purity" in Greek

Other names
- Related names: Katherine, Catherine, Cathrina

Cathrinus is a Latinized masculine version of the feminine name Katherine/Catherine. The name originated from the Greek feminine name Αἰκατερίνα or Αἰκατερίνη (Aikaterina, Aikaterinē), which is of unknown etymology. The earliest known use of the Greek name is in reference to one of the first Christian saints, Catherine of Alexandria. Cathrinus is a rare name.

The name Cathrinus is mainly used in Dutch and Scandinavian-speaking countries, but has also been found in the German-speaking realm, e.g. as a Latinized surname in the 17th century. Notable people with the given name include:

- Cathrinus Bang, Norwegian literary historian

== See also ==
- Katherine
