= Aino Nykopp-Koski =

Finnish nurse convicted of killing patients

- Born: Aino Kerttu Annikki Nykopp; November 1950
- Convictions: 5 murders, 5 attempted murders, 3 aggravated assaults, 4 thefts, 2 drug possessions
- Penalty: Lifetime

Details
- Victims: 5
- Span of crimes: 2004–2009
- Country: Finland
- Date apprehended: March 2009

Aino Nykopp-Koski (born November 1950) is a Finnish serial killer. She worked as a nurse and was found guilty of killing five patients and the attempted murder of five more. No motive was established for the murders.

== Crimes ==
Between 2004 and 2009 Nykopp-Koski worked at a range of hospitals, care homes and patients' homes. There she killed five elderly patients using sedatives and opiates. She was apprehended in March 2009.

Nykopp-Koski was tried in Helsinki District Court in December 2010 and pleaded not guilty, though the court convicted her. She was sentenced to life in prison (minimum of 12 years before likely pardon). During the mental health assessment, psychiatrists found out that Nykopp-Koski is psychopathic and has an antisocial personality disorder, but she was deemed culpable for her actions. The sentence was upheld by Helsinki Court of Appeals in March 2012. Supreme Court of Finland dismissed her leave to appeal in November 2012.

After her conviction, Nykopp-Koski changed her name to Ann-Maria Myllgren.

In May 2020, the Helsinki Court of Appeals rejected Myllgren's parole application. Myllgren had requested to be paroled in March 2021, when she would have served the legal minimum of 12 years.

== See also ==
- Katariina Pantila
- List of serial killers by country
