= Vuka, Osijek-Baranja County =

Vuka
- Municipality
- Location within Osijek-Baranja County Location within Croatia
- Coordinates: 45.44°N 18.51°E
- Country: Croatia
- Region: Slavonia
- County: Osijek-Baranja County

Government
  - Mayor: Ivica Bagarić

Area
  - Municipality: 24.8 km^{2} (9.6 sq mi)
  - Urban: 19.0 km^{2} (7.3 sq mi)

Population (2021)
  - Municipality: 984
  - Density: 39.7/km^{2} (103/sq mi)
  - Urban: 764
  - Urban density: 40.2/km^{2} (104/sq mi)
- Time zone: UTC+1 (Central European Time)
- Website: opcina-vuka.hr

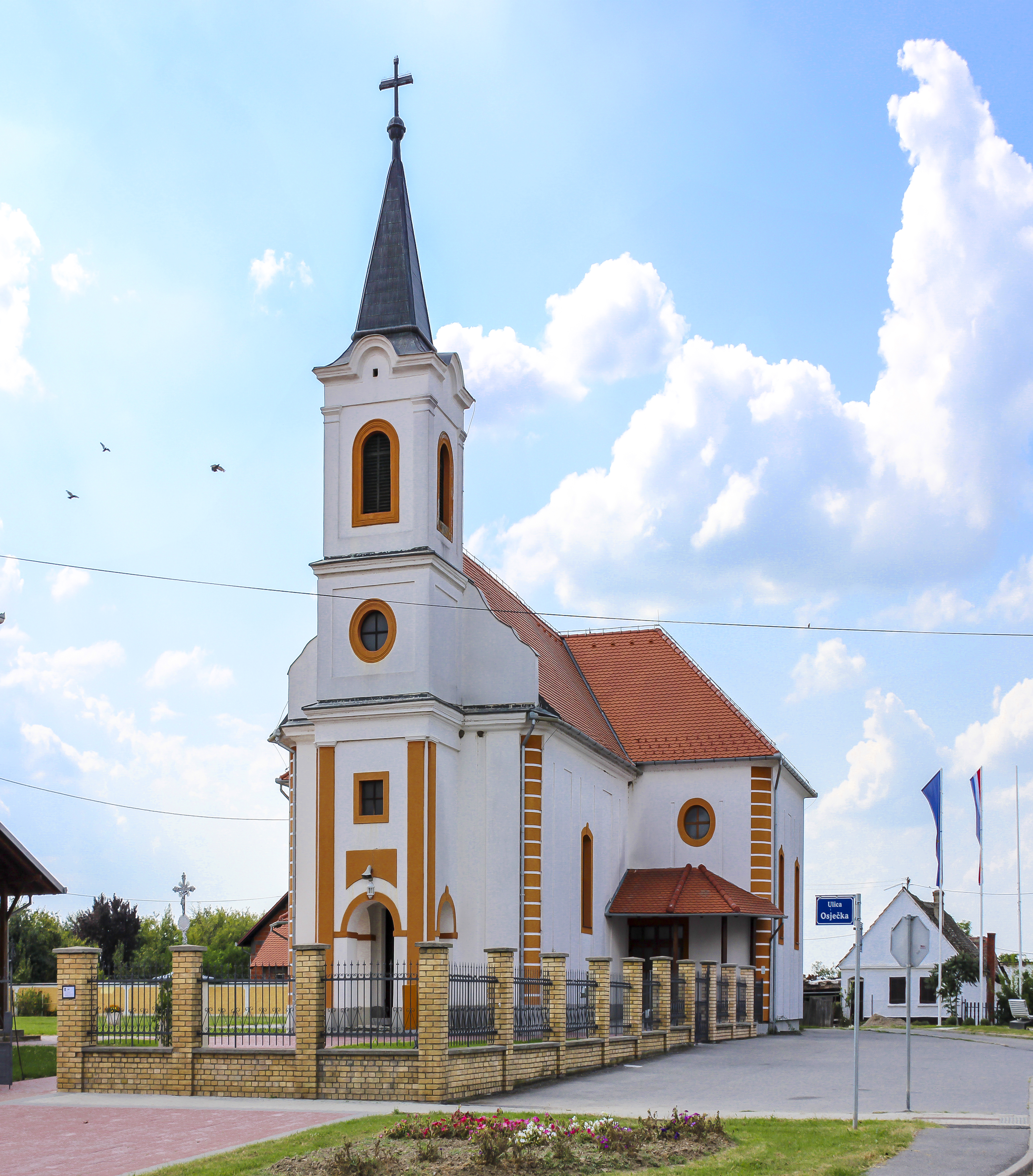

Vuka (Hungarian: Kisújlak) is a village and a municipality in Osijek-Baranja County, in eastern Croatia.

In the 2011 Croatian census there were 1,200 inhabitants, in the following settlements:

- Hrastovac, population 173
- Lipovac Hrastinski, population 82
- Vuka, population 945

In the same census, 97.17% were Croats.

Colonist settlement of Bijele Klade was established on the territory of the village municipality during the land reform in interwar Yugoslavia.

== Famous people ==
- Katarina Matanović-Kulenović - first female Croatian pilot and parachutist
- Milko Cepelić - Croatian priest, historian and ethnographer
