= Katheryn =

- Gender: Female

Other names
- Related names: Katherine, Catherine

Katheryn is a feminine given name. It is a variant of Katherine. Notable people with the name include:

- Katheryn Curi, American cyclist who placed first at the National Road Race Championships in Park City
- Katheryn K. Russell, associate professor of criminology and criminal justice at the University of Maryland
- Katheryn of Berain, Welsh noblewoman noted for her four marriages
- Katheryn Elizabeth Hudson, or Katy Perry - American singer and songwriter
- Katheryn Winnick, Canadian actress. Well known for her role as Lagertha in Vikings.
