= Katarina Löfström =

Swedish artist (born 1970)

Katarina Löfström (born 1970 Falun, Sweden) is a Swedish artist. She attended the University College of Arts, Crafts and Design in Stockholm. Her work consists of animated videos, sculptural installations and sound. She is best known for short films such as "Hang Ten Sunset" (2000) and "Downhill" (2016), and sculptural works like "Open Source (Cinemascope)" (2018), which is permanently on view in Wanås Sculpture Park. She has also been commissioned for several public art works in Sweden and abroad.

Katarina Löfström is represented by Andréhn-Schiptjenko Gallery in Stockholm and Paris.

== Notable works ==
- Vanitas (Loop), (2021)
- Open Source (Cinemascope), (2018)
- Downhill (2016)
- A Void, (2013)
- Crying Skyscraper, (2009)
- An Island (2004)
- Whiteout (2001)
- Hang Ten Sunset (2000)
