= Ketlin Priilinn =

Estonian writer and translator (born 1982)

- Ketlin Priilinn
- Ketlin Priilinn in 2024
- Born: 31 March 1982 (age 44); Viljandi
- Occupation: librarian at the Pääsküla Library
- Notable work: The Adventures of Berta the Dog

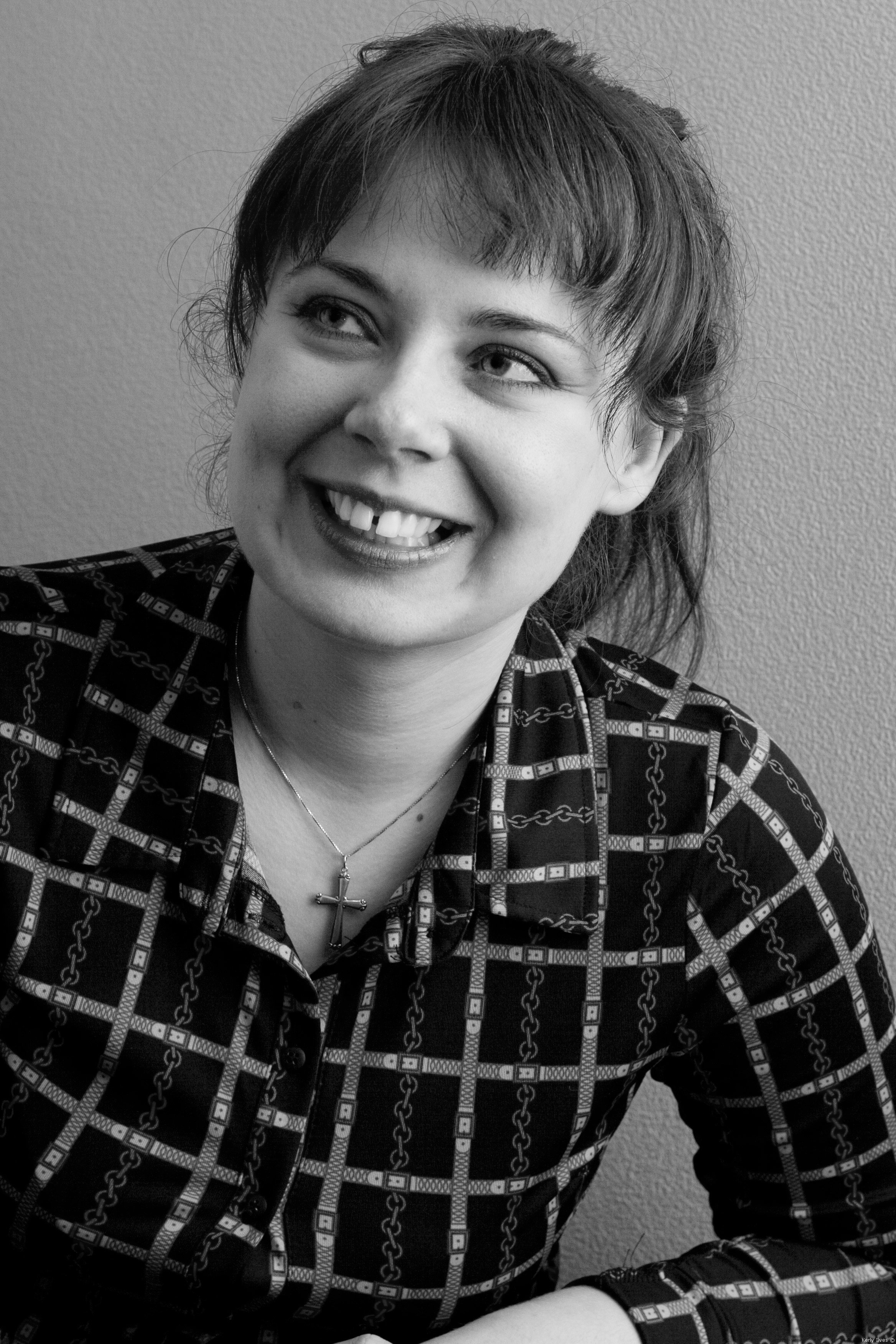
Priilinn in 2010

Ketlin Priilinn (born 31 March 1982 in Viljandi) is an Estonian writer and translator. She has written a number of books for children, young adults and adult readers. She has also translated four novels from English into Estonian. Priilinn is a member of Estonian Writers’ Union (EWU).

== Selected works ==
=== As author ===
- "Koeralaps Berta seiklused" (Tänapäev, 2005)
- "Lugusid koertest" (Kentaur, 2005)
- "Peaaegu Tuhkatriinu" (Kentaur, 2007)
- "Maarjamäe kägu" (Tänapäev, 2007)
- "Anna ja tema merisiga Julius" (Tänapäev, 2007)
- "Hõbeingel" (Tänapäev, 2007)
- "Tüdruk nimega Maricruz" (Kentaur, 2007)
- "Vaim" (Tänapäev, 2008)
- "Liiseli võti" (Tänapäev, 2008)
- "Hirm pole tähtis" (Kentaur, 2008)
- "Väike kuninganna" (Tänapäev, 2009)
- "Bertrande" (Tänapäev, 2009)
- "Mustlasplikad" (Tänapäev, 2009)
- "Sefiirist loss" (Tänapäev, 2010)
- "Ei iialgi ilma Murita" (Kentaur, 2010)
- "Liblikasonaat" (Tänapäev, 2010)
- "Evelini lood" (Tänapäev, 2011)
- "Igavesti sõbrad" (Tänapäev, 2012)
- "Armastusega fännidelt" (Tänapäev, 2012)
- "Kameeleonmees" (Tänapäev, 2013)
- "Miraculum" (Tänapäev, 2015)
- "Roosi ja Liisu seiklused" (Tänapäev, 2015)
- "Halloween" (Tänapäev, 2015)
- "Enne kui on hilja" (Tänapäev, 2015 – Rebecca Lindeberg crime series, book 1)
- "Evelini uued lood" (Tänapäev, 2016)
- "Kas keegi kuuleb mind?" (Tänapäev, 2017 – Rebecca Lindeberg crime series, book 2)
- "Kommionu" (Tänapäev, 2018 – Rebecca Lindeberg crime series, book 3)
- "Jenny Dahlgren" (Tänapäev, 2018 – Rebecca Lindeberg crime series, book 4)
- "Lumehaldjas" (Tänapäev, 2020 – Rebecca Lindeberg crime series, book 5)
- "Evelini elu" (Tänapäev, 2020)
- "Emily raamatuklubi" (Tänapäev, 2021 – Friends series, book 1)
- "Stockholmi sündroom" (Hea Lugu, 2021)
- "Ta ei teinud seda" (Tänapäev, 2021)
- "Väike raamatupoodnik Alice" (Hea Lugu, 2022)
- "Kerstini ketsid" (Tänapäev, 2022 – Friends series, book 2)
- "Rosete kirjutab romaani" (Hea Lugu, 2023)
- "Lugu kadunud raamatust" (Tänapäev, 2023 – Library Detectives series, book 1)
- "Milla mõtisklused" (Tänapäev, 2024 - Friends series, book 3)

=== As translator ===
- Walter Mosley "Kuus Easy lugu" (Eesti Raamat, 2004)
- Ruth Rendell "Aadam ja Eeva ja Näpista Mind" (Eesti Raamat, 2005)
- Michael Cunningham "Kodu maailma lõpus" (Eesti Raamat, 2006)
- Susan Kay "Fantoom" (Eesti Raamat, 2006)
