= Katariina Pantila =

Finnish nurse convicted of killing patients

Katariina Meri-Tuulia Pantila (born Katariina Hyttinen, first marriage Katariina Lönnqvist, 1981 - March 8, 2010) was a Finnish murderer and nurse.

== Activities ==
In March 2007, Pantila, a nurse, gave a baby an injection of insulin at a family gathering. A few days later she murdered a mentally disabled patient she was caring for. She was apprehended, put on trial and convicted of the murder of the patient and the attempted murder of the baby.

== Personal life ==
Pantila was born Katariina Hyttinen in 1981, her surname changing to Lönnqvist from her first marriage. During her criminal trial was her divorce, and she later married again in prison, where her surname was Pantila from then on.

In March 2010, Pantila was found dead in her prison cell.

== See also ==
Other nurses convicted of murdering patients:

- Abraão José Bueno
- Edson Isidoro Guimarães
- Aino Nykopp-Koski
- Catherine Wilson
