= Cathryn =

- Gender: Female

Other names
- Related names: Katherine, Catherine

Cathryn is a feminine given name. It is a variant of Katherine. Cathryn may refer to:

- Cathryn Bradshaw, (Born 1964), English actress
- Cathryn Carson, American historian of science
- Cathryn Damon (1930–1987), American actress
- Cathryn Hankla (born 1958), American poet and novelist
- Cathryn Harrison (born 1959), English actress
- Cathryn Humphris, American television writer
- Cathryn Mataga, game programmer who has worked on Neverwinter Nights
- Cathryn Fitzpatrick (born 1968), Australian cricketer
- Cathryn Michon, actress and stand-up comic

== See also ==
- Katherine (given name)
