= Katharina Bergobzoomová =

Austrian opera singer

Katharina Bergobzoomová (born Katharina Leitner; 26 June 1755, Vienna – 18 June 1788, Prague) was an Austrian opera singer.

After the death of her parents, she was adopted by her eldest half-sister's husband, E. Schindler, director of the Viennese court porcelain factory. He arranged for her education and supported the beginnings of her singing career. She debuted in September 1770. Until 1777, she performed under the artistic pseudonym Katharina Schindler. In April 1777, she married theatre director Johann Baptist Bergobzoom and changed her name. They had eleven sons.

Bergobzoomová toured Europe between 1770 and 1788, performing at the Italian Vienna opera, the Duchy of Brunswick court theatre and the Estates Theatre in Prague. She was one of the first opera singers in Bohemia.
