= Katherina =

Katherina may refer to:

- Katharina Bellowitsch
- Katherine Hadford
- Susanne Langer

In literature:

- Katherina Minola, primary character in the Shakespeare play The Taming of the Shrew.

== See also ==
- Catherina (disambiguation)
