= Katarina Matanović-Kulenović =

Croatian aviator (1913–2003)

- Born: 18 March 1913; Vuka, Croatia-Slavonia, Austria-Hungary
- Died: 24 April 2003 (aged 90); Zagreb, Croatia
- Military career
- Allegiance: Kingdom of Yugoslavia; Independent State of Croatia
- Branch: Croatian Air Force
- Service years: 1941 - 1945
- Rank: Lieutenant
- Conflicts: World War II
- Awards: Order of Danica Hrvatska with face of Franjo Bučar

Katarina Matanović-Kulenović (18 March 1913 in Vuka – 24 April 2003 in Zagreb) was the first female Croatian pilot and parachutist.

Born near Osijek in 1913, she lived in Zagreb from 1918. She became a graduated pilot in the Yugoslav Royal Air Force in 1936. She parachuted at an air show in Zemun in 1938.

During the Independent State of Croatia period she was married to Croatian journalist Namik Kulenović. From 1943 she served in the Croatian War Air Force. For a time she was the personal pilot of minister Ante Vokić. In 1944, her husband died in a plane crash. After the Second World War she was no longer allowed to fly in Communist Yugoslavia and her story was largely unknown.

She received the Order of Danica Hrvatska from Croatian president Franjo Tuđman in 1998. In 2000 Boris Puhlovski wrote a biography on Matanović-Kulenović titled Katarina na krilima.

Matanović-Kulenović died in 2003.
