= Katri =

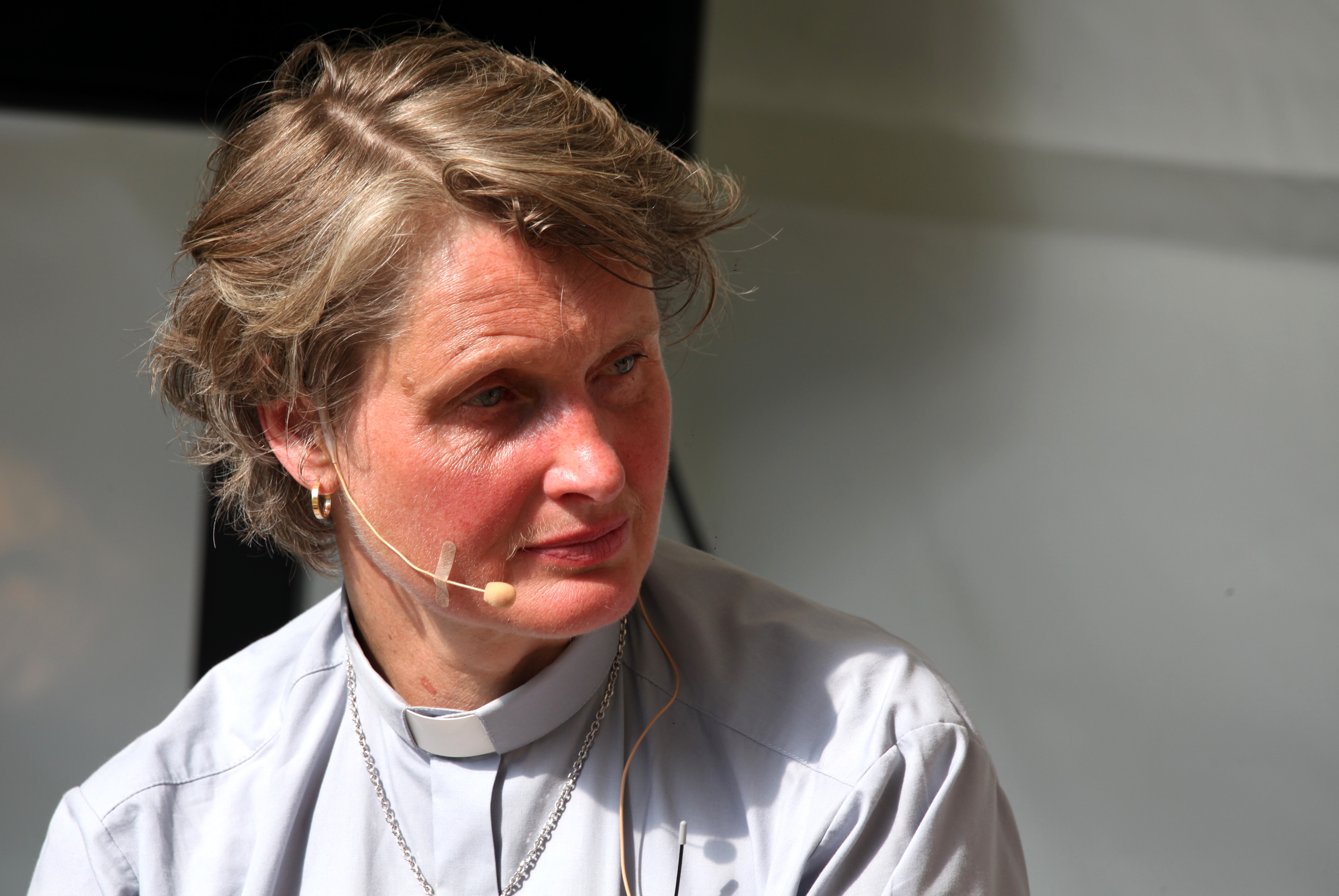
Katri Aaslav-Tepandi at the Opinion Festival 2022 in Paide, Estonia.

Katri is a given name. Notable people with the name include:

- Katri Helena (born 1945), Finnish singer
- Katri Horma (born c. 1970), Estonian actress
- Katri Javanainen (born 1969), Finnish ice hockey player
- Katri Kaarlonen (1915–2008), Finnish politician
- Katri Kalpala (born 1976), Finnish rhythmic gymnast
- Katri Kulmuni (born 1987), Finnish politician
- Katri Läike (born 1967), Finnish sailor
- Katri Lindeqvist (born 1980), Finnish orienteering competitor
- Katri Lipson (born 1965), Finnish writer
- Katri Lylynperä (born 1994), Finnish cross-country skier
- Katri Mattsson (born 1982), Finnish footballer
- Katri Raik (born 1967), Estonian politician
- Katri Rosendahl (born 1984), Finnish endurance rider
- Katri Suutari (born 1976), Finnish archer
- Katri Vala (1901–1944), Finnish poet
- Katri Ylander (born 1985), Finnish singer
- Katri-Helena Eskelinen (1925–2014), Finnish politician
- Hanna-Katri Aalto (born 1978), Finnish tennis player

== See also ==
- Katri, Girl of the Meadows, anime series
- Katri Daddi, village in India
