= Katariina (given name) =

- Gender: Female

Origin
- Region of origin: Finland, Estonia

Other names
- Related names: Katarina, Riina, Riin

Katariina is a Finnish and Estonian feminine given name. It is a cognate of Katherine.

Notable people bearing the name Katariina include:

- Katariina Lahti (born 1949), Finnish film director and screenwriter
- Katariina Pantila (1981–2010), Finnish nurse and convicted murderer
- Katariina Ratasepp (born 1986), Estonian actress
- Katariina Souri (born 1968) Finnish author, artist, model
- Katariina Tuohimaa (born 1988), Finnish tennis player
- Katariina Unt (born 1971), Estonian actress
