= Katharina Rapp =

German artist

Katharina Rapp (born 1948) is a German artist.

Katharina Rapp was born in war-torn southern Germany. After completing her high school education, she moved to Paris to study at the Sorbonne, then to London where she met her husband. She later moved to Switzerland, where she had two children, and to Scotland, where she had her third child. She then moved to Australia, where she still works as an artist today.

Her dominant medium is the oil painting, with over-the-top and humorous characterisation in vivid colours. Stylistically, she has been likened to the Dutch painter Kees van Dongen.
