= Katerina Kanonidou =

Katerina Kanonidou (Greek: Κατερίνα Κανονίδου) is one of Greece's top fashion models. Along her twin sister Angeliki they have appeared in many Greek and international fashion magazines and events. In 2001, she was voted as one of the most Beautiful People in the world. She is famous for her involvement in the Greek human rights society and the WWF. Moreover, she was TV presenter for many years in Omega TV, TV 100 and Makedonia TV of Thessaloniki. Her half brother is the basketball player Andreas Kanonidis.
