= Catarina (given name) =

- Gender: Female

Origin
- Origin: Portuguese, Galician

Other names
- Variant forms: Catharina, Katarina, Caterina
- Related names: Catherine, Catriona

Catarina is a feminine given name. It is a Portuguese, and Galician form of the name Katherine. It may refer to:

== Portuguese infantas ==
- Infanta Catarina of Portugal (1436–1463), daughter of Edward, King of Portugal
- Infanta Catarina, Duchess of Braganza (1540–1614), granddaughter of Manuel I, King of Portugal and pretender to the Portuguese throne
- Catherine of Braganza (1638–1705), wife and consort of Charles II, King of England, Scots, and Ireland

== Other people ==
- Catarina Eufémia, illiterate harvester from Alentejo, Portugal who was murdered during a worker's strike
- Catarina Lindqvist (born 1963), Swedish tennis player
- Catarina Ruivo, Portuguese film director
- Catarina Rodrigues, Portuguese judoka
- Catarina Rönnung (born 1938), Swedish politician
- Catarina van Hemessen, Flemish Renaissance painter
- Dona Catarina, Sinhala noble, Queen of the Kingdom of Kandy in 1591 and again from 1594-1604
- Catarina Valentine, fictional character in the Nickelodeon sitcom Victorious
