= Ecaterina =

Ecaterina is a Romanian female first name meaning Catherine. Notable persons with that name include:

- Ecaterina Andronescu (born 1948), Romanian politician and engineer
- Ecaterina Arbore (c. 1874 – 1937), Romanian-Soviet communist activist and official
- Ecaterina Ciorănescu-Nenițescu (1909–2000)– Romanian chemist
- Ecaterina Nazare (born 1953), Romanian actress
- Ecaterina Oancia (1954–2024), Romanian rowing cox
- Ecaterina Szabo (born 1967), Romanian-Hungarian gymnast
- Ecaterina Teodoroiu (1894–1917), Romanian heroine of World War I
- Ecaterina Varga (1802 – after 1852), Hungarian leader of the Transylvanian Miners' Movement
