= Riina (given name) =

- Gender: Female
- Languages: Estonian, Finnish
- Name day: 9 October

Origin
- Region of origin: Estonia, Finland

Other names
- Related names: Katariina, Riin, Rina

Riina is an Estonian and Finnish feminine given name, often a diminutive form of Katariina. People bearing the name Riina include:

- Riina Gerretz (1939–2014), Estonian pianist
- Riina Hein (born 1955), Estonian film actress, director, producer and screenwriter
- Riina Kionka (born 1960), American-born Estonian diplomat
- Riina Maidre (born 1982), Estonian actress
- Riina Ruismäki (born 2001), Finnish aesthetic group gymnast
- Riina Sikkut (born 1983), Estonian politician
- Riina Sildos (born 1964), Estonian film producer
- Riina Solman (born 1972), Estonian politician
