= Katrine, Virginia =

Unincorporated community in Virginia, United States

Coordinates: 37°35′6″N 78°34′41″W

Katrine is an unincorporated community in Buckingham County, in the U.S. state of Virginia.
