= Kätlin Valdmets =

Estonian beauty queen and model (born 1988)

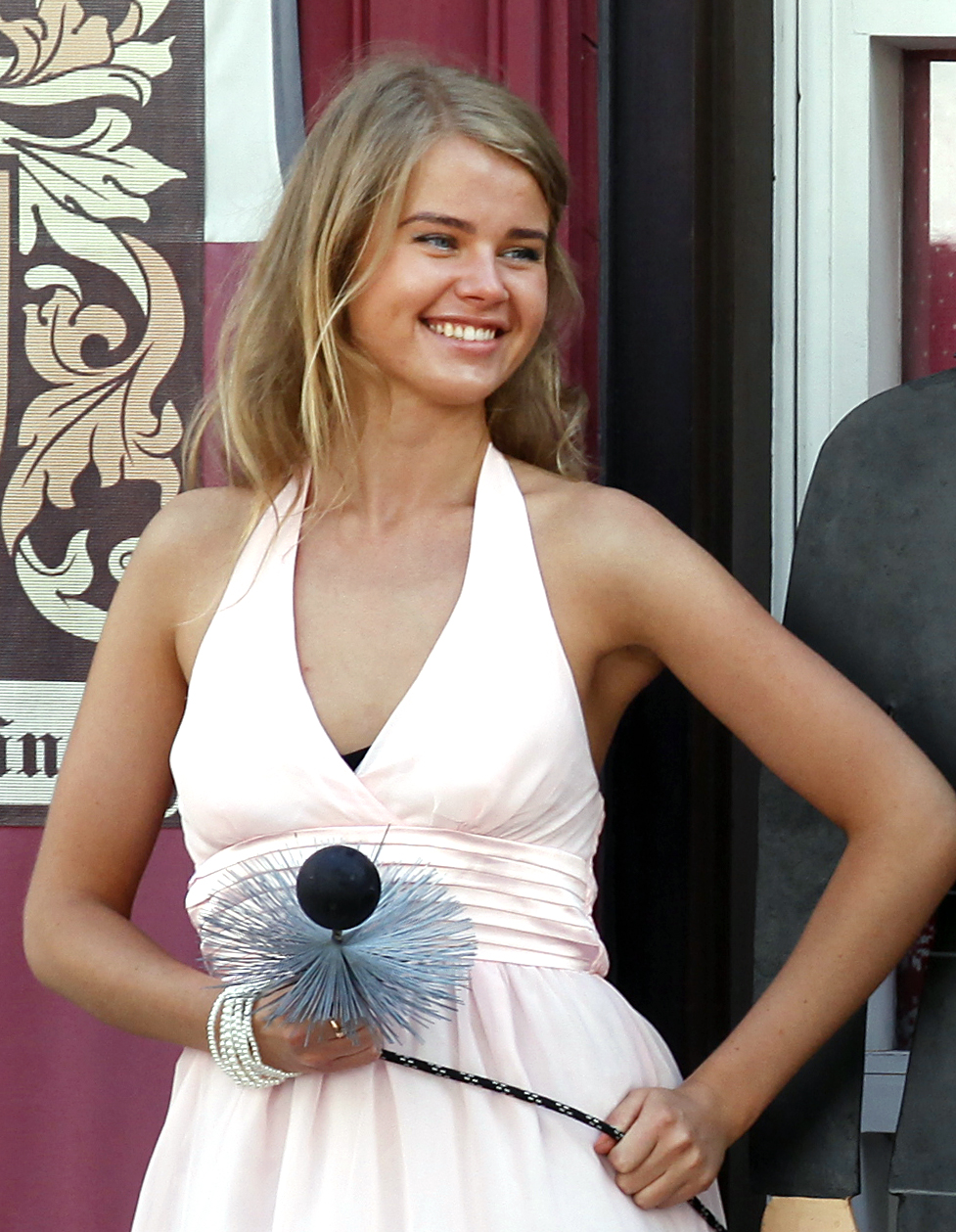
- Born: 1988 (age 37–38); Tallinn, then part of Estonian SSR, Soviet Union
- Occupations: Cook; governess
- Height: 1.75 m (5 ft 9 in)
- Beauty pageant titleholder
- Title: Miss Estonia 2012
- Hair color: Blonde
- Eye color: Blue

Kätlin Valdmets (born 1988) is an Estonian beauty queen, model, who won the title of Miss Estonia in 2012.

Awards and achievements
Preceded by Madli Vilsar	Miss Estonia; 2012 (withdrew)	Succeeded by Incumbent
