= Catalina D'Erzel =

Mexican journalist, playwright, novelist and poet

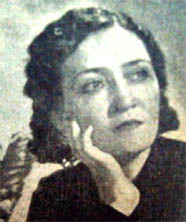
Catalina D'Erzel in the 1920s

Dulché Catalina Escalante (29 June 1897 – 3 January 1950), better known as Catalina D'Erzel, was a Mexican journalist, playwright, novelist and poet.

== Biography ==
=== Early life ===
Escalante was born on 29 June 1897 in Silao, Guanajuato. According to various sources, she began her writing career at an early age; dramas such as Orphans and The plagiarist, were written at the age of 12. At the age of 18, she published her first story under her pseudonym D'Erzel in the El Nacional newspaper.

=== Career and legacy ===
The majority of D'Erzel's career was devoted to journalism. She collaborated in renowned newspapers and magazines such as El Universal, El Universal Ilustrado, El Hogar, El Demócrata, El Nacional, Revista de Revistas as well as the magazine Todo. Between 1932 and 1941, she published a column in the newspaper Excélsior called "Digo yo como mujer", that served as the opening that would "unmask the seudomoralistas talking about women." This section served to publish ideas on the perception of the women in journalism, especially from the perspective of writer Francisco Ibarra de Anda in his book

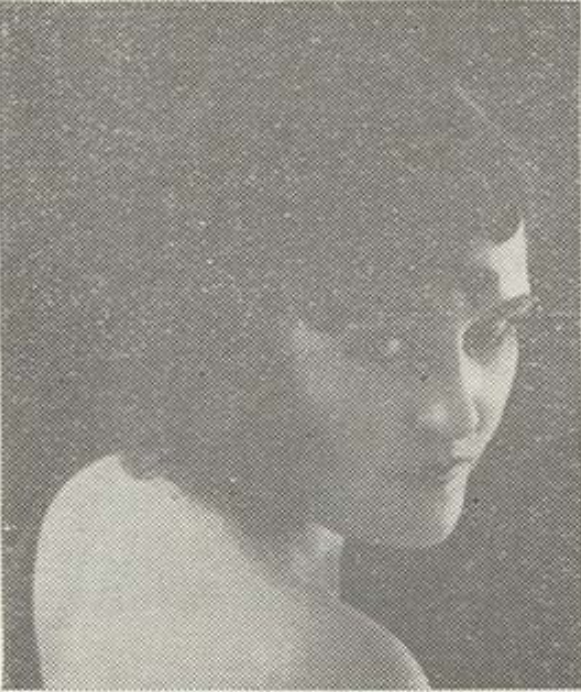
Catalina D'Erzel. Catalina Dulché Escalante (1897-1950)

I have not read the book, and I will read it, if I am aware of your appearance, it is for the many protests by journalists and Mexican writers [...] It would be better than all the intellectuals in the libel criticized and even maligned bringing us all together for indict the slanderer.

In 1945, she received the Ordre des Palmes Académiques for the play Los hijos de Francia. She died on 3 January 1950. According to experts, "she represented the vanguard of a social theater. Of a theater that educated Awoke consciences about the political and economic social problems she faced daily." Although D'Erzel stated that Mexican society asked the woman not to think for herself, her works served as an instruction to the public of the problems that existed regarding the lack of activity of women in literature.

== Sources ==
=== Bibliography ===
- Baeza, Gabriela (2006). La imagen de la mujer en la crónica del "México de afuera" (in Spanish). UACJ. ISBN 9687845805.
- Campos, Patricia (2000). Una mujer empresaria de principios de siglo (in Spanish). Sincronía, Universidad de Guanajuato.
