= Kathryn Malstrom =

American politician

Member of the Washington Senate from the 27th district
- In office 1933–1937
- In office 1939–1945

Personal details
- Born: 1888 Wilmer, Minnesota
- Died: August 16, 1961 (aged 72–73) Seattle, Washington
- Party: Democratic
- Education: University of Puget Sound; University of Washington; Washington State University

Kathryn E. Malstrom (1888 – August 16, 1961) was an American politician. She was a Democrat, representing District 27 in the Washington State Senate which included parts of Pierce County.
