= Alf Cate =

New Zealand cricketer

Personal information
- Full name: William Alfred Cate
- Born: 22 November 1878; Upper Hutt, New Zealand
- Died: 22 October 1939 (aged 60); Petone, New Zealand
- Batting: Right-handed
- Role: Wicket-keeper

Domestic team information
- Years: Team
- 1908/09–1922/23: Wellington

Career statistics
Competition	First-class
Matches	5
Runs scored	43
Batting average	6.14
100s/50s	0/0
Top score	11
Catches/stumpings	4/2
- Source: CricketArchive, 20 April 2017

William Alfred Cate (22 November 1878 – 22 October 1939) was a New Zealand cricketer who played four matches of first-class cricket for Wellington between 1908 and 1922, and represented New Zealand in 1922–23.

Alf Cate worked as a wool classer in Wellington, and taught wool classing at the Hutt Valley Memorial Technical College for 25 years. He and his wife had a daughter.

A wicket-keeper, Cate made his first-class debut in 1908, but then had to wait until 1920 before he played again, partly because Wellington had New Zealand representative wicket-keepers in Jeremiah Mahoney and James Condliffe in this period, but also because he was unable to make himself available. Despite his age (44) and lack of first-class experience, Cate replaced Condliffe as New Zealand's wicket-keeper in the third of the three matches New Zealand played against MCC in 1922–23. It was his last first-class match.

The former New Zealand captain Tom Cobcroft, writing in the New Zealand Truth, regarded Cate still as New Zealand's best wicket-keeper in 1925, when Cate was 47, hampered by ill-health, and playing only club cricket for Petone in Wellington.
