= Katja Oxman =

German-born American visual artist (b. 1942)

- Born: Katharina Protassowsky; 1942 (age 83–84); Munich, Germany
- Other names: Katja Protassowsky, Katja Protassowsky Oxman, Katharina Oxman
- Education: Pennsylvania Academy of the Fine Arts (BFA), Academy of Fine Arts, Munich, Royal College of Art (MFA)
- Occupations: Visual artist, educator
- Known for: Printmaking
- Movement: Realism
- Spouse: Mark Oxman (m. 1966)
- Website: www.katjaoxman.com

Katja Oxman (née Katharina Protassowsky; born 1942) is a German-born American visual artist and educator. She is known for her still life work with assembled objects, created in color etching with aquatint. Oxman taught art for at the American University; and lived in Silver Spring, Maryland and Amherst, Massachusetts, United States.

== Early life and education ==
Katharina Protassowsky was born in 1942, in Munich, Germany. Her father Mischa Protassowsky was Russian and of the White movement, who fled during the Russian Civil War; and her mother Gretl Hell was German, however after their marriage her mother lost her citizenship. Her family moved to the United States in 1952. She started making artwork as a teenager. In 1966, she married artist Mark Oxman in England, and together they have children.

Oxman attended the Pennsylvania Academy of the Fine Arts (PAFA) and graduated in 1965; she continued her studies for a year at Academy of Fine Arts, Munich in Germany; and attended the Royal College of Art in London, where she studied printmaking and graduated in 1967.

== Career ==
Oxman started her teaching career at Bryn Mawr College in 1968, and at Haverford College. In 1975, she was hired at the University of Massachusetts Amherst. She worked from 1976 to 1985 at the American University in Washington, D.C.

Oxman creates still life compositions of indoors with assembled objects, she has stated this composition style came from living in New England, after she had her first child. Objects found in her work may include flowers, bird figurings, bird feathers, bird nests, a window, patterned textiles and Middle Eastern-style rugs, mirrors, and postcard references to 19th century art (like Paul Gauguin, and Japanese woodblock prints). For the addition of colors in her etchings, they often feature three or four printmaking plate layers. She produces only a few print editions per year.

Her work can be found in museum collections including at the Smithsonian American Art Museum; the Museum of Fine Arts, Houston; the Minneapolis Institute of Art; the Woodmere Art Museum; the Portland Art Museum; the Pennsylvania Academy of the Fine Arts; the McNay Art Museum; the Rhode Island School of Design Museum; the Cleveland Museum of Art; the Flint Institute of Arts; and the Detroit Institute of Arts.
