= Katarina Milovuk =

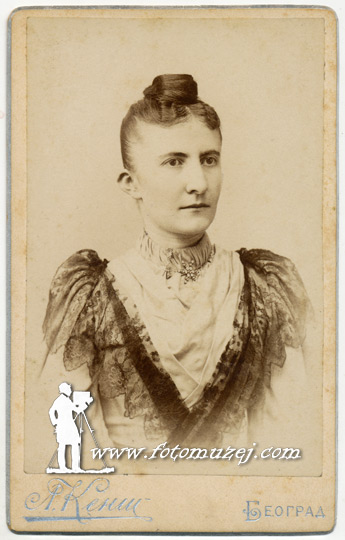
Katarina Milovuk

Katarina Milovuk (1844–1913), was a Serbian educator and women's rights activist. She was the principal and director of the first institution of higher learning for women in Serbia, the Women's Grandes écoles in Belgrade, in 1863–1893, and founder of the first women's organization in Serbia, the Žensko društvo (Women's Society).

== Life ==
Katarina Milovuk was appointed director of the then newly founded Women's Grande école in Belgrade in 1863. This was the first institution of higher learning open to women in Serbia, and the only one until 1891: first a three-year program, it offered four years in 1866, five in 1879, and six in 1886, and mainly focused as a training college for female teachers within the national school system.

In the mid-19th century, Western European ideas of women's rights began to spread among the urban middle classes in Serbia, especially focused on giving women higher knowledge to make them suitable as mother-teachers and intellectual partners of their husbands. In 1875, Katarina Milovuk founded the first women's organization in Serbia: the Women's Society of Belgrade, which was to be the dominating women's organisation in Serbia until the establishment of the Circle of Serbian Sisters in 1903. The society was primarily focused on humanitarian issues such as helping poor women and children, particularly war orphans.

=== Fight for Women's Suffrage ===
In 1897, she applied to be enrolled in the voters' register and when refused, she launched an official complaint that was rejected with a 2:1 vote at the lower court. She did not appeal, but in 1903 she wrote to the Serbian King Alexander asking for the women's at least passive right to vote, claiming the right of choice and responsibility for that choice made as being a fundamental human right. In 1913, speaking at the International Woman Suffrage Alliance congress in Budapest, she appeared in public for the last time less than two months before her death.

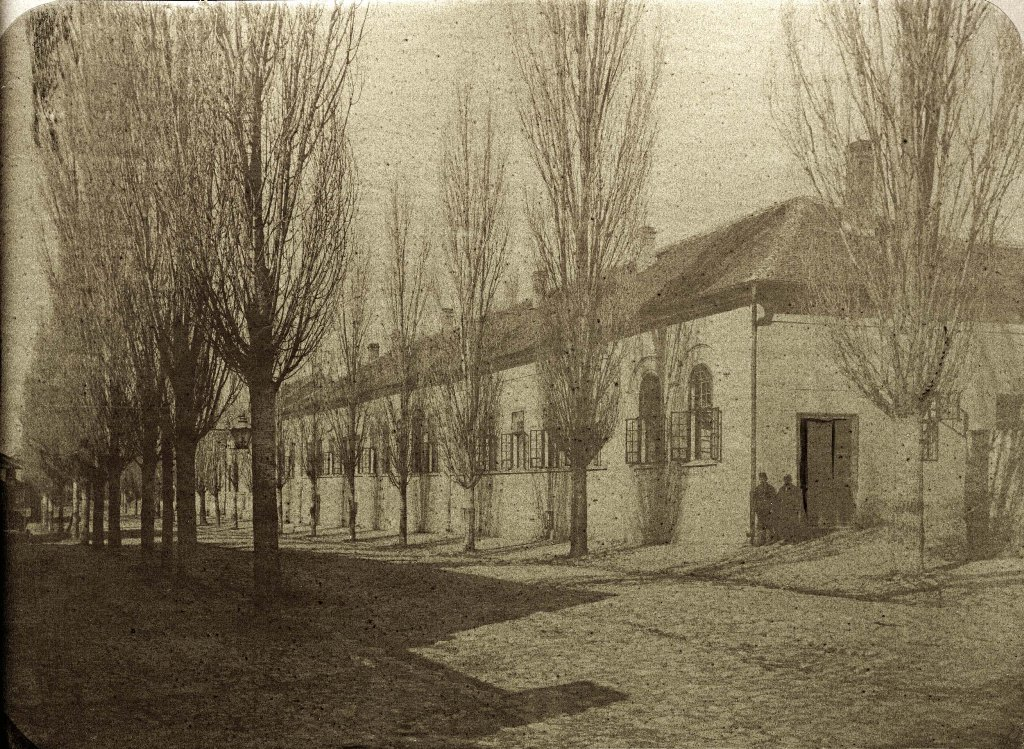
The building of the Higher Women's School in Belgrade, built in 1860 and demolished in 1930

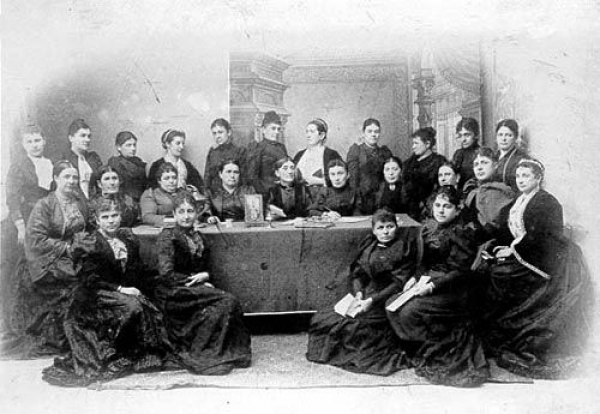
Management of the Belgrade Women's Society, 1894

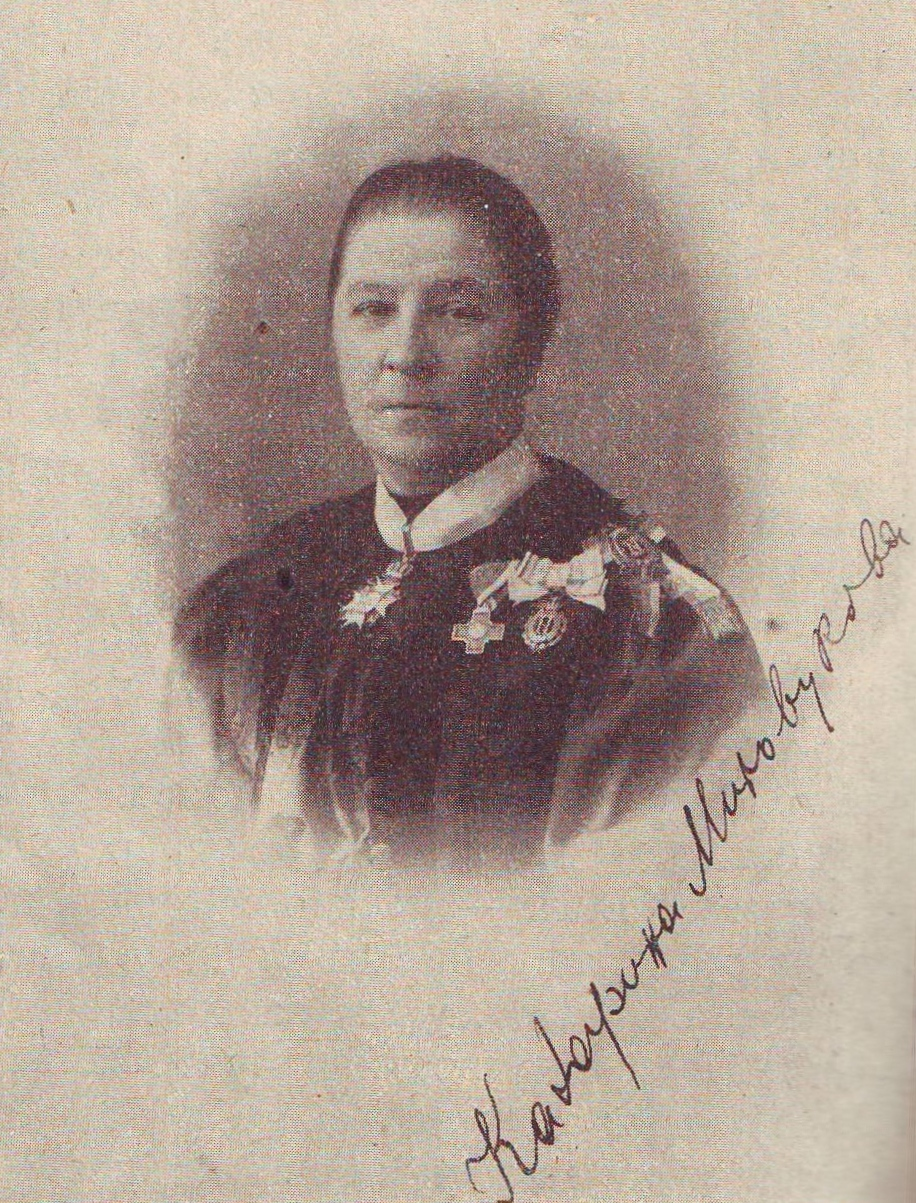
Photograph of Katarina Milovuk with orders, with her signature
