= Pavol Ďurica =

Slovak footballer

Personal information
- Full name: Pavol Ďurica
- Date of birth: 17 May 1983 (age 43)
- Place of birth: Czechoslovakia
- Height: 1.80 m (5 ft 11 in)
- Position: Midfielder

Senior career*
Years	Team	Apps	(Gls)
?–2001	DAC Dunajská Streda		
2001	Bardejov		
2001–2002	DAC Dunajská Streda	1	(0)
2002–2003	MŠO Štúrovo		
2004–2007	DAC Dunajská Streda	51	(7)
2007–2009	Artmedia Petržalka		
2008	→FC Fehérvár (loan)	4	(0)
2009–2010	MFK Petržalka	24	(2)
2010–2012	DAC Dunajská Streda	25	(0)
2012–2013	SC Ritzing		
2013–2014	DSC Orechova Poton		
2014–2016	Rapid Ohrady		
2016–2018	SK Vydrany		
- * Club domestic league appearances and goals as of 12 July 2012

Pavol Ďurica (born 17 May 1983) is a former Slovak footballer who played as a midfielder.

In early 2008, he joined the Hungarian team FC Fehérvár on loan from Artmedia Bratislava, where he played only four games, but during this short period he scored a remarkable own goal against Debreceni VSC in the Hungarian Cup quarter-final on 27 March 2008. The match was heading towards extra time, when Debrecen was awarded a penalty in the last minute, which was saved by the goalkeeper of FC Fehérvár, but the ball bounced back to the penalty spot and the arriving Ďurica, desperately wanting to clear to the stands, hammered it into his own goal clipping the post. The video of the own goal immediately became a major hit on the internet, producing millions of downloads within only a few days. A few days after this match, Ďurica was released from FC Fehérvár because he failed to show up for a match with the reserves.

He is the brother of Slovak international Ján Ďurica.
