= Catharine (given name) =

- Gender: Female

Other names
- Variant form: Katharine
- Related names: Catherine
- See also: Katherine

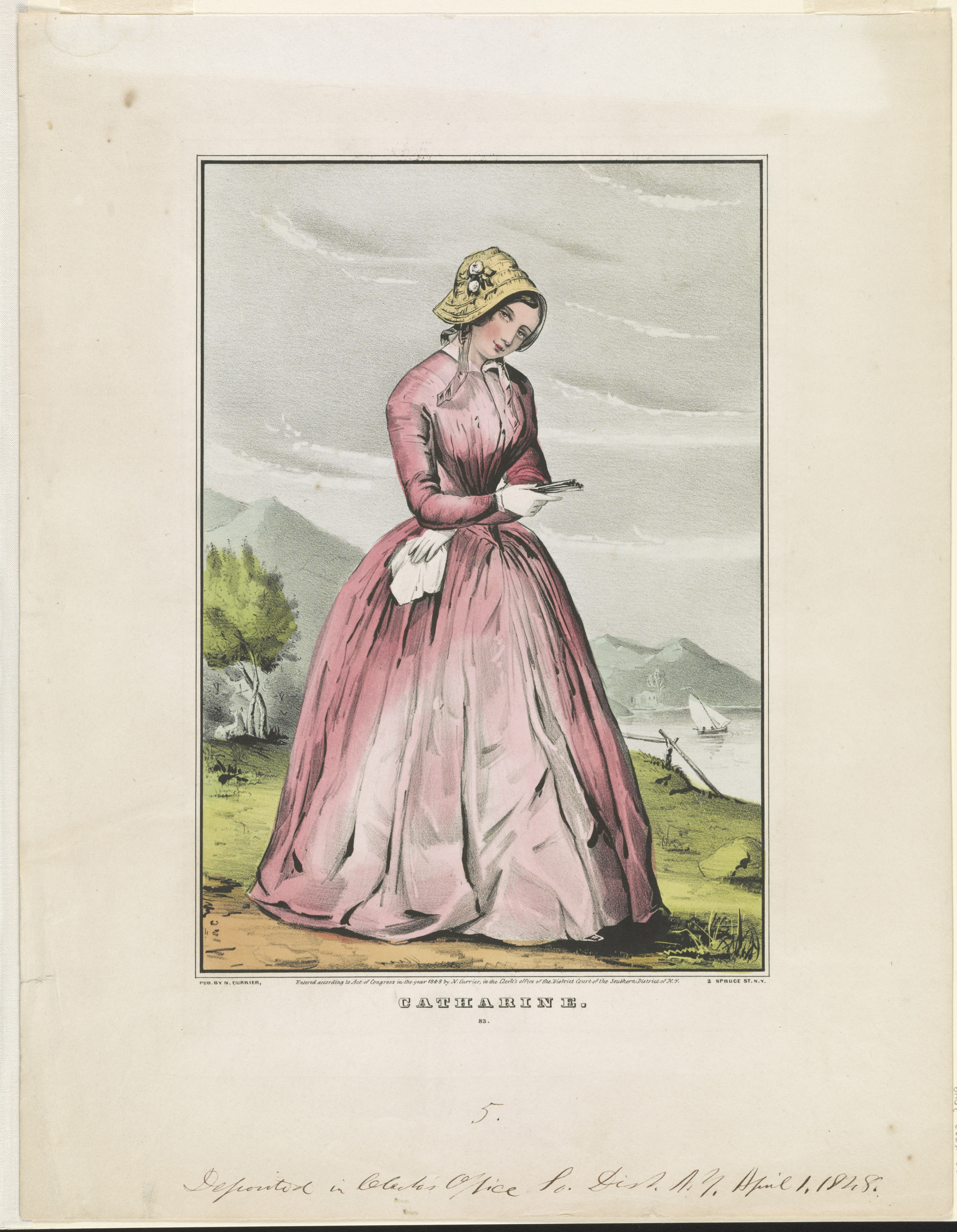
Lithograph titled "Catharine" c. 1848

Catharine is a feminine given name, a variation of Katherine or Catherine. Notable people with the name include:

In education:

- Catharine Beecher, noted educator
- Catharine Paine Blaine, American teacher and suffragist
- Catharine MacKinnon, American feminist, scholar, lawyer, teacher, and activist
- Catharine Merrill, one of the first female university professors in the United States

In literature:

- Catharine Webb Barber (1823-?), American newspaper editor, author
- Catharine Carver (1921–1997), American-British publisher's editor
- Catharine H. Esling (1812–1897), American writer
- Catharine Hitchcock Tilden Avery, 1844–1911), American author, editor, educator
- Catharine Trotter Cockburn, 1679–1749), English novelist, dramatist, philosopher
- Catharine Sedgwick, American novelist

In science:

- Catharine Cox, American psychologist known for her work on intelligence and genius
- Catharine Garmany, astronomer

In rulers:

- Catherine the Great, Empress of Russia from 1762 till 1796 known as the country's longest-ruling female.

Other:

- Catharine (Tennessee), an enslaved American mother born about 1835
