= Katharina Kohl =

German politician (born 1992)

Member of the Landtag of Saxony-Anhalt
- Incumbent
- Assumed office 6 October 2026

Personal details
- Born: 24 January 1992 (age 34) Heilbad Heiligenstadt, Germany
- Party: Social Democratic Party
- Education: Martin Luther University Halle-Wittenberg

Katharina Kohl (born 24 January 1992) is a German politician of the Social Democratic Party of Germany (SPD). Since 2026, she has been a member of the Landtag of Saxony-Anhalt. She has also served as a city councillor in Halle (Saale) since 2024.

== Life and career ==
After completing her secondary education (Abitur), Kohl studied at Martin Luther University Halle-Wittenberg. She passed the First State Examination and, following her teacher training (Referendariat), the Second State Examination to qualify as a secondary school teacher. She subsequently worked as a teacher of German and history at a secondary school in Halle.

Kohl joined the SPD in 2019. In the 2024 Saxony-Anhalt local elections, Kohl was elected to the city council of Halle (Saale) for the SPD. She serves on several committees, including the Committee for Social Affairs, Health and Gender Equality and the Audit Committee.

At the end of August 2025, Kohl was initially nominated as an SPD candidate for the 2026 state election in the Halle III constituency. She later withdrew her candidacy. In December 2025, she was announced as the SPD candidate in the Bitterfeld-Wolfen constituency (constituency 28), without any opposing candidates within the party.

In the 2026 Saxony-Anhalt state election, held in September 2026, Kohl entered the Landtag via the SPD's state party list. In her constituency, the SPD recorded a slight increase in its second-vote share, while its first-vote share declined by 1.5 percentage points. Following the election, she became the youngest SPD member of the newly elected state parliament.
