= Trina Papisten =

Pomeranian alleged witch

- Born: Brilon, Duchy of Westphalia, Holy Roman Empire
- Died: August 30, 1701; Stolp, Province of Pomerania, Kingdom of Prussia
- Cause of death: Burned at the stake
- Other names: Katarzyna Nipkowa; Kathrin Zimmermann
- Occupation: Merchant
- Known for: Last person executed for sorcery in Słupsk
- Criminal charges: Witchcraft
- Criminal penalty: Execution
- Spouses: Martin Nipkow; Andreas Zimmermann

Kathrin "Trina" Zimmermann, known in history as Trina Papisten ('Trina the Papist', the latter being a derogatory term for Catholics) (died 30 August 1701), was a Pomeranian alleged witch. She is referred to as the last person to be executed for sorcery in, what was then, the city of Stolp.

== Biography ==
Kathrin Zimmermann was born in Brilon, Westphalia and of Catholic faith. Her first husband, Martin Nipkow, served with the dragoons in Brilon and took her to his hometown of Stolp. After his death she married a butcher, Andreas Zimmermann from Stolp. She turned out to be a great merchant and soon threatened the competition of the neighbouring butcher's shopkeepers. In addition, she was quite well acquainted with folk medicine and did not integrate too much with the Lutheran inhabitants. The accusation of witchcraft levied against the Catholics by the Protestant community was recognized as religiously motivated. On 27 July 1701 the Faculty of Law of the University of Rostock issued a legal opinion authorising torture against the accused. She was brought before a court which, after torture, sentenced her to be burned at the stake.

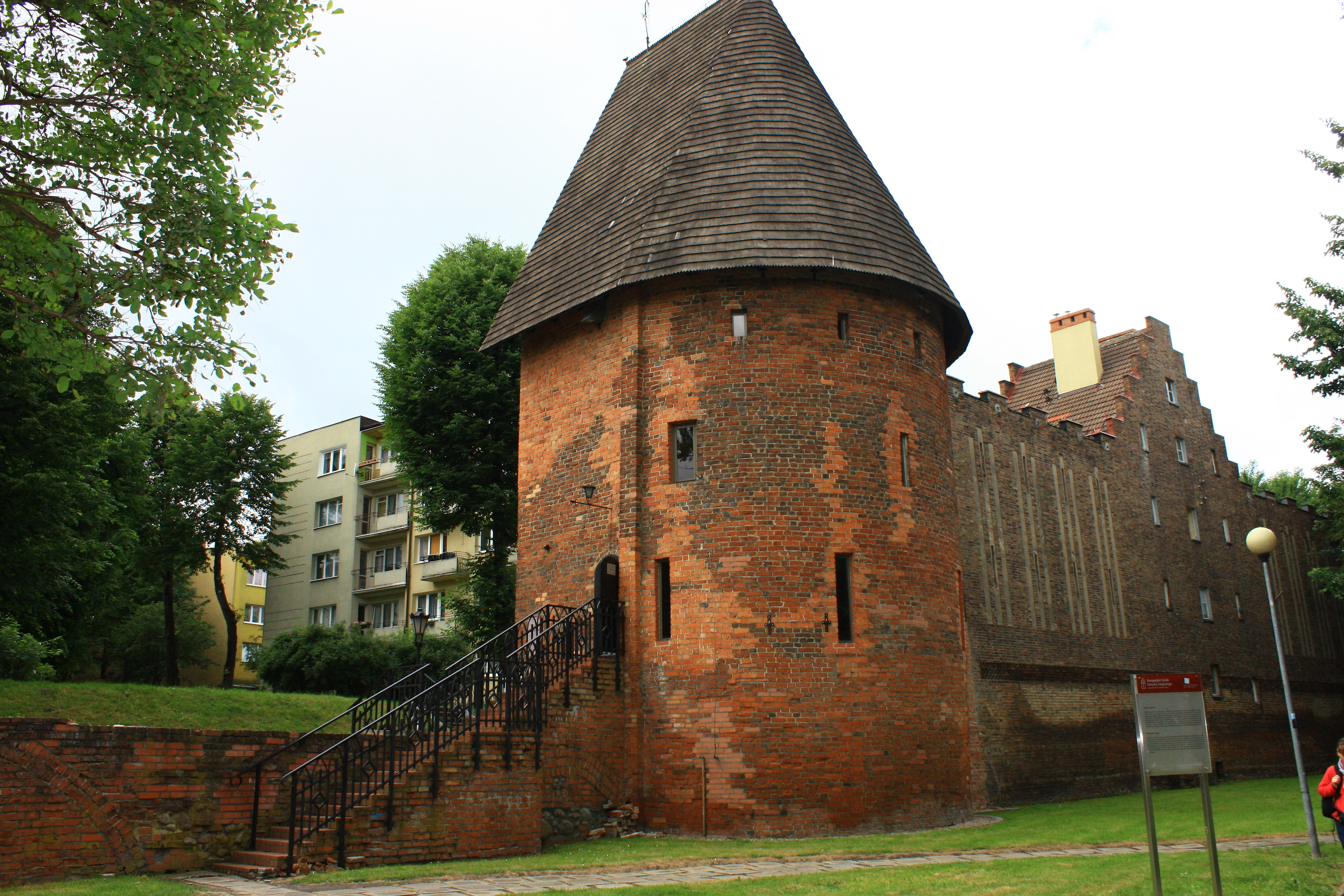
The site of Papisten's execution

Though born in Westphalia, it has been speculated she was of Kashubian origin. In 2016, a roundabout was opened in Słupsk by the town's mayor Robert Biedroń named after Papisten. In 2024 a commemorative mural was unveiled in her honour.
