= Kitty Geisow =

New Zealand painter and insurance broker

Catherina "Kitty" Wilhelmina Geisow (24 January 1876 – 1958) was a New Zealand painter and insurance broker. Her works are held in the Hocken Collections.

== Biography ==
Geisow was born in Queenstown in 1876, the third daughter of Franz William Frederick Geisow, an emigrant from Frankfurt-on-Main, and Mary Fraser, daughter of Robert Fraser, of Melbourne. Fraser and Geisow were married in 1871 in Invercargill by the Reverend A.H. Stobo. Geisow's mother was born in Alloa, Scotland, and emigrated with her family to Victoria, Australia. She died of cancer in Queenstown in 1907, aged 69.

Geisow's father was an insurance agent, the town clerk, and a Justice of the Peace by the time he died in 1904, and was well-known in Queenstown. After his death, his three daughters took over the insurance agency, but by 1913 only Kitty Geisow is listed as the agent, and she remained as such until her death in 1958.

From May 1928 until March 1950, Geisow owned a cottage on Park Street, Queenstown, opposite the Queenstown Gardens. Writer and poet Charles Brasch was believed to have stayed at the cottage with Geisow and her sister Gertie. When the land was subdivided in 1950, one lot was sold to Peter William Fels, a relative of Brasch.

In his memoir, Brasch recalls Geisow and her sister:

Gertie and Kitty Geisow came from Queenstown for their Dunedin season; two aged countrywomen as I saw them now, in whose slow quiet kindly voices, patient and humorous, I heard half my own past, and knew again the rock and tussock, the gums and pines and matagouri, the shining pebbles of the lake shore and Queenstown's old limestone schist houses — all Wakatipu almost except the lake water. They loved to talk of the past and especially of our family; they recalled my great-grandparents, dead forty years earlier, as old familiar respected friends who might be living still — 'Mr and Mrs Hallenstein'. Since I had not known them, I thought of them rather as familiar historical characters, Bendix Hallenstein and Mary Mountain.

Geisow exhibited with the Otago Art Society in 1908, and received praise for her works:

Kitty Geisow is another exhibitor who seems to be on the right path. Her 'Coronet Peak' and 'Lake Wakatipu', if sketchy, have every appearance of being original, and 'Queenstown' (No 417) shows that this lady sees accurately, knows what to put in, and possesses more than a little power in finishing a picture.

Geisow also exhibited with the Dunedin Public Art Gallery Society in 1923. Geisow produced a series of watercolour paintings of the Queenstown district, most painted in the 1920s and 1930s.
