= Katarina Cicak =

Physicist

- Born: 1974 (age 51–52); Derventa
- Education: University of Southern California (BS), Cornell University (PhD)
- Known for: Charge density waves, microwave photonics
- Scientific career
- Fields: Physics
- Workplaces: NIST
- Thesis: Low-temperature Collective Transport and Dynamics in Charge Density Wave Conductor Niobium Triselenide
- Doctoral advisor: Robert E. Thorne

Katarina (Kat) Cicak (born 1974) is a physicist. She is a researcher in the advanced microwave photonics group at the National Institute of Standards and Technology.

== Early life and education ==
Cicak was born in 1974 in Derventa in former Yugoslavia. In 1992 during the war in Yugoslavia, she relocated to Croatia and then to the United States as a refugee.

Cicak received an A.S. in Mathematics Science in 1995 from the College of the Sequoias and a B.S. in physics from the University of Southern California in 1997. She performed graduate research in physics at Cornell supervised by Robert E. Thorne. Despite finishing her project in 2004, she only formally defended her dissertation in 2007 and submitted it in 2020. It is entitled Low-temperature Collective Transport and Dynamics in Charge Density Wave Conductor Niobium Triselenide.

== Career ==
During her undergraduate studies, Cicak completed internships at the Goddard Space Flight Center. In 2004, she began working at NIST in Boulder, Colorado.

At NIST, Cicak is a member of the Advanced Microwave Photonics research project. This work is part of NIST's Quantum Information Program and combines advances in components for quantum computation based on superconductive circuits, mechanical components, and optical interactions. Cicak has contributed to a mechanical "micro-drum" resonator that can couple to microwave radiation in operation at 40 milliKelvin in a superconducting cavity. The team took the strong coupling a step further using sideband cooling to lower the temperature to below 400 microKelvin toward a quantum ground state.

She has a patent for a "Reticulated Resonator".

== Awards ==
In 2022, Cicak was awarded the U.S. Department of Commerce Gold Medal for "work experimentally tested the physical size limits at which quantum mechanics ends and classical physics begins." In 2021, she was awarded the Physics World 2021 Breakthrough of the Year for "entangling two macroscopic vibrating drumheads, thereby advancing our understanding of the divide between quantum and classical systems." In 2020, she was awarded the NIST Technology Partnership Office Patent of the Month for "Reticulated resonator, the process for making and use of same".

== Personal life ==
Cicak is married to Kevin D. Moll, a researcher whom she met at Cornell.
