= Katarina Durica =

Slovak-Hungarian novelist

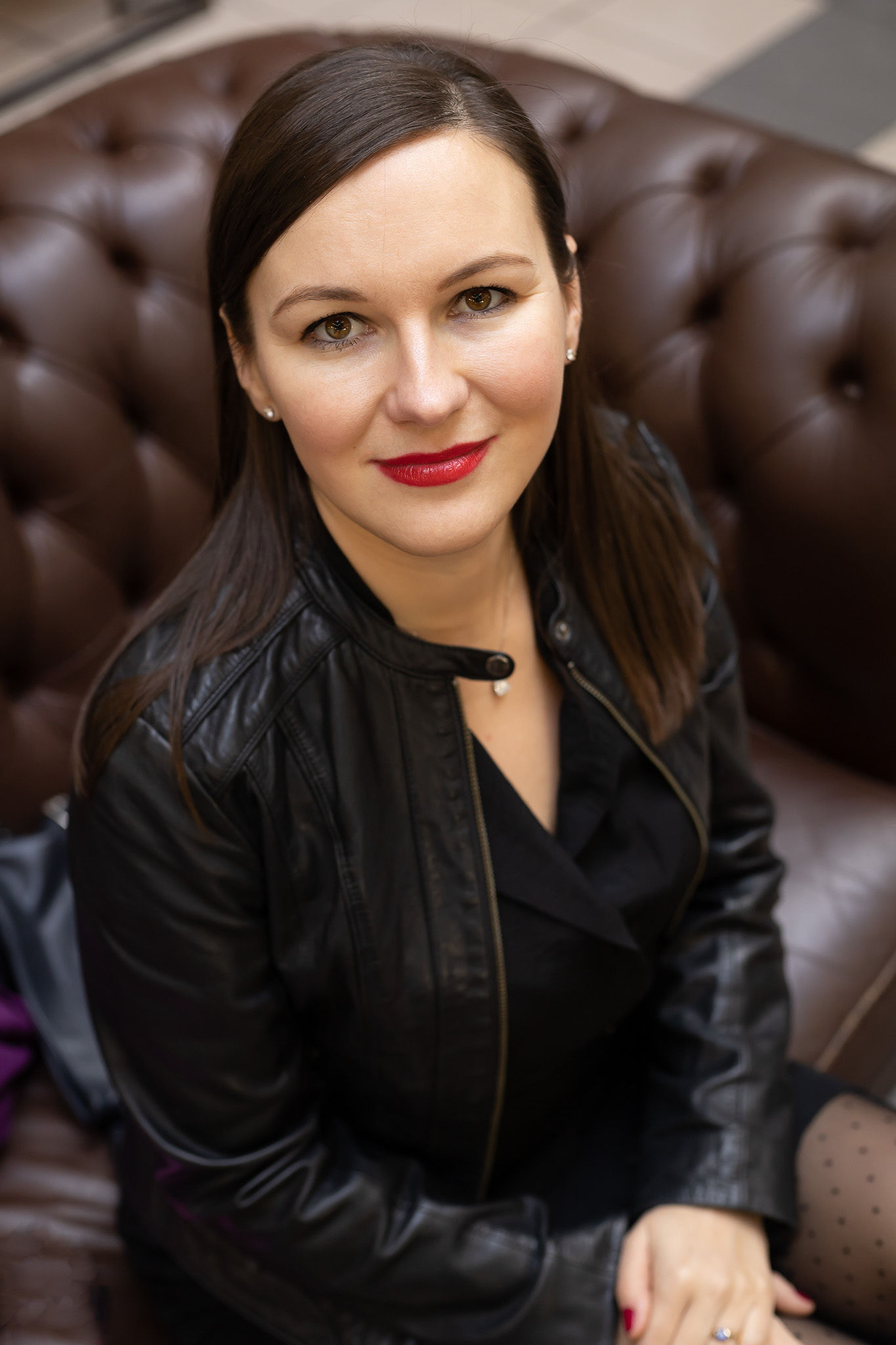
- Born: 1983 (age 42–43); Bratislava, Czechoslovakia
- Spouse: Botond Feledy
- Awards: 2019 Aranykönyv nominee 2020 Highlights of Hungary nominee 2023 ELLE Awards Author of the Year nominee
- Website: www.duricakatarina.com

Katarina Durica (born 1983) is a Slovak writer and journalist of Hungarian ethnicity. She is a and member of the Society of Hungarian Authors.

== Life ==
Durica was born in 1983 in Bratislava and grew up in Šamorín. She studied Art History at Trnava University. In 2004, she traveled to Egypt, where she worked as a tour guide. Next, she moved to Jordan, Turkey, then Tunisia, and the experiences of living in these countries inspired her to write her first book.

She moved to Bratislava in 2008 to work as a journalist. In 2010, during the Iveta Radičová's – who became Slovakia's first female PM that year – administration, she was spokesperson for the Ministry of Environmental Protection and Agriculture. She has worked as a freelance journalist in Budapest, to this day she often makes reports and interviews on topics related to women, such as domestic violence, illegally operating egg donors and surrogate mothers in Eastern Europe, and women who are survivors of mafia violence.

In 2011-2013, she reported for Index about various Slovak political events. Since 2013, her writings are published in the Hungarian ELLE magazine, National Geographic, and various other platforms and magazines. Since 2023, she has her own column in Nők Lapja, Hungary's most read weekly magazine.

Her first book, Escape to Egypt – inspired by her travels and the tourist destinations of the Middle East –, was published in Hungarian in 2013, then in Slovak in 2014. Her second novel, To Love in Slovak, which delves into the Slovak Hungarian identity, was published for the 2016 Budapest Book Fair.

In 2018, her third book was published, titled Good Girls Cry in Silence, about the victims of the Hungarian mafia in Upper Hungary. To write the novel, she had been collecting accounts from those who were affected, interviewing victims and perpetrators. The novel was sold out a few days after it was first published, it is (as of January 2024) in its 10th edition. It was also adapted into a stage play, directed by Béla Paczolay, and debuted in March 2021 in the Comedy Theater of Budapest, where the shows are still regularly sold out. On 14 November 2023, the show was performed for the 50th time. The play was also performed at the eSzínház festival, where Mari Kiss received the award for best actress.

Her fourth book was published through her self-founded Red Snow Publishing. Urban Foxes introduces the world of Brussels nightlife, diplomat wives, and Eastern European prostitutes. The book’s publication coincided with the resignation of MEP József Szájer, after his sex scandal. Good Girls Cry in Silence and Urban Foxes were also published in Slovak by Albatros Publishing.

In 2022, she published her fifth novel titled How Much Did It Cost You?, where she talks about the world of Hungarian surrogate mothers, egg donors and barren women.

== Family ==
She lives in Brussels, with her husband Botond Feledy, and their three children.

== Awards and nominations ==
- 2019 Aranykönyv ("Golden Book") podium finish
- 2020 Highlights of Hungary nominee for her work in aiding vulnerable women
- 2023 ELLE Awards Author of the Year nominee

== Novels ==
- Escape to Egypt (Jaffa Publishing, 2013)
- To Love in Slovak (Libri Publishing, 2016)
- Good Girls Cry in Silence (Libri Publishing, 2018)
- Urban Foxes (Red Snow Publishing, 2020)
- How Much Did It Cost You? (Red Snow Publishing, 2022)
