= Trina (name) =

- Pronunciation: tree nuh
- Gender: female

Origin
- Origin: Scandinavian
- Meaning: pure

Other names
- Variant forms: Katrina; Catherine; Katherine

Trina is a common female first name of Scandinavian origin. The name is based on the Latin word for "triple", Trena.

Trina is often used as a shortened version of names such as Katrina.

In dance, it is used as a term referring to a ballerina in training.

== People named Trina ==
- Trina (born 1974), American rapper, born Katrina Taylor
- Trina Belamide, a Filipino songwriter and record producer
- Trina Braxton (born 1974), American singer, actress and reality television personality
- Trina Davis (born 2001), American-born Fijian women's footballer
- Trina Gulliver (born 1969), a female darts player, and ten-time ladies' world champion
- Trina Hamlin, an American folk-rock singer-songwriter
- Trina Hosmer (born 1945), American cross-country skier
- Trina Jackson (born 1977), American freestyle swimmer who won an olympic gold medal
- Trina McGee (born 1969), American actress
- Trina McQueen (born 1943), Canadian journalist and broadcasting executive
- Trina Medina (born 1960), Venezuelan Salsa and Son singer, songwriter and music arranger
- Trina Nishimura (born 1983), American voice actress working with Funimation
- Trina Papisten (died 1701), Polish alleged witch
- Trina Parks (born 1946), American actress, vocalist, choreographer, principal dancer and dance instructor
- Trina Pratt (born 1986), American former competitive ice dancer
- Trina Radke (born 1970), American former competitive swimmer
- Trina Roache, a Mi'kmaq video journalist,
- Trina Robbins (1938-2024), American cartoonist.
- Trina Schart Hyman (1939-2004), American illustrator
- Trina Shoemaker (born 1965), a mixer, record producer and sound engineer
- Trina Vargo, the founder and President of the US-Ireland Alliance
- Triinu Kivilaan (born 1989), Estonian vocalist and former model, previously a member of the band Vanilla Ninja
- Trina Kirk, a Canadian country music artist
- Trina Saha (born 1993), Indian actress based in India.

=== Fictional ===
- Trina Echolls, a fictional recurring character portrayed by Alyson Hannigan, on the television series Veronica Mars
- Trina Vega, played by Daniella Monet in the show Victorious
- Trina, played by Terra Vnesa in the Canadian drama Degrassi: The Next Generation
- Trina Riffin, a fictional character from Grojband
- Trina, a recurring antagonist from Big Hero 6: The Series voiced by Christy Carlson Romano
- Trina (Taylor), a fictional long-distance swimmer played by Melora Walters in the 1994 comedy Cabin Boy
- Trina Weisenbachfeld, a fictional character from the musical Falsettos She was played by Barbara Walsh in the show's original 1992 Broadway run, and Stephanie J. Block in the 2016 revival.
- Trina Tightrope, from the american children's television show JoJo's Circus

== See also ==
- Treena Livingston Arinzeh (born 1970), American academic
- Treena Lahey, a character from Trailer Park Boys
