= Riin =

Female given name

Riin is an Estonian feminine given name. Notable people with the name include:

- Riin Emajõe (born 1993), Estonian footballer
- Riin Tamm (born 1981), Estonian geneticist
