= Ekaterina =

- Gender: Female

Origin
- Language: Russian
- Meaning: Pristine

Other names
- Alternative spelling: Cyrillic: Екатерина
- Variant forms: Yekaterina, Ekaterine
- See also: Katerina, Katherine

Ekaterina is a Russian feminine given name, and an alternative transliteration of the Russian Yekaterina. Katya and Katyusha are common diminutive forms of Ekaterina. Its Western counterpart is Catherine (Katherine). Notable people with the name can be found below.

== Arts ==
- Ekaterina Medvedeva (born 1937), Russian naïve painter
- Ekaterina Sedia (born 1970), Russian fantasy author
- Yekaterina Petrovna Zamolodchikova, persona of American drag performer Brian Joseph McCook (born 1982)

== Sports ==
- Yekaterina Abramova (born 1982), Russian speed skater
- Ekaterina Alexandrova (born 1997), Russian professional tennis player
- Ekaterina Alexandrovskaya (2000–2020), Russian-Australian pairs skater
- Ekaterina Anikeeva (born 1969), Russian water polo player
- Ekaterina Antropova (born 2003), Russian-Italian volleyball player
- Ekaterina Bychkova (born 1985), Russian professional tennis player
- Ekaterina Dafovska (born 1975), Bulgarian biathlete
- Ekaterina Dzehalevich (born 1986), Belarusian professional tennis player
- Yekaterina Gamova (born 1980), Russian volleyball player
- Ekaterina Gordeeva (born 1971), Russian Olympic and World figure skating champion
- Ekaterina Ivanova (biathlete) (born 1977), Belarusian biathlete
- Ekaterina Ivanova (tennis) (born 1987), Bychkova's Russian compatriot and professional tennis player
- Ekaterina Karsten (born 1972), Belarusian rower
- Yekaterina Khramenkova (born 1956), Soviet long-distance runner
- Ekaterina Kramarenko (born 1991), Russian artistic gymnast
- Ekaterina Kurakova (born 2002), Russian-Polish figure skater, who represented Poland at the 2022 and 2026 Winter Olympic Games
- Yekaterina Lobaznyuk (born 1983), Olympic gymnast who competed for Russia in the 2000 Olympic Games in Sydney
- Yekaterina Lobysheva (born 1985), Russian speed skater
- Ekaterina Makarova (born 1988), Ivanova's Russian compatriot and professional tennis player
- Yekaterina Nesterenko (born 1976), Russian alpine skier
- Ekaterina Nikolaidou (born 1992), Greek rower athlete
- Yekaterina Podkopayeva (born 1952), middle-distance runner who represented the USSR and later Russia
- Ekaterina Selezneva (born 1995), Russian rhythmic gymnast
- Ekaterina Shatnaya (born 1979), Kazakhstani athlete
- Ekaterina Shliapnikova (born 2005), Russian canoeist
- Yekaterina Smirnova (born 1956), Soviet heptathlete
- Ekaterina Aleksandrovna Vasilieva (born 1976), Russian water polo player
- Ekaterina Vandaryeva, a Russian kickboxer
- Ekaterina Yashina (born 1993), Russian tennis player

== Politics ==
- Catherine the Great (1729–1796), Empress of Russia, called in Russian Yekaterina Velikaya
- Ekaterina Furtseva (1910–1974), first woman to be admitted into the Politburo
- Ekaterina Kalinina (1882–1960), Soviet politician and First Lady of the Soviet Union
- Yekaterina Kuskova (1869–1958), Russian Marxist political figure
- Ekaterina Svanidze (1880–1907), Georgian first wife of Joseph Stalin
- Yekaterina Vorontsova-Dashkova (1743–1810), the closest female friend of Empress Catherine the Great

== Other fields ==
- Yekaterina Geltzer (1876–1962), prima ballerina of the Bolshoi Ballet who danced in the theatre from 1898 to 1935
- Yekaterina Golubeva (1966–2011), Russian actress
- Ekaterina 'Katia' Ivanova (born 1988), Kazakh-born English model and contestant on Celebrity Big Brother 2010
- Ekaterina Korbut, woman Grandmaster of chess
- Ekaterina Maximova (1939–2009), Russian ballerina
- Ekaterina Peshkova (1887–1965), Russian human rights activist and humanitarian
- Ekaterina Polovnikova-Atalik (born 1982), Russian-Turkish Grandmaster of chess
- Ekaterina Salnikova (1928–2016), Russian chemist
- Ekaterina Zelyonaya (1902–1991), Soviet actress and singer of Ukrainian ancestry

== Fictional characters ==
- Yekaterina "Katya" Derevko
- Ekaterina Golovkina, a character in the Life
- Ekaterina Dmitrievna Smokovnikova, The Road to Calvary
- Kate Daniels from the Magic Series by Ilona Andrew's. Kate' real name is Ekaterina, but she always calls herself Kate.
- Ekaterina Alexandrovna Shcherbatskaya (Kitty), a character in Anna Karenina
- Ekaterina 'Kitty' Erzabet Enfield, a character in Spirit Box Radio

== See also ==
- Katherine
- Ekaterina, branch in the Cahill family (The 39 Clues)
