= Catriona =

- Pronunciation: /kəˈtriːənə/ kə-TREE-ə-nə
- Gender: Feminine
- Language: English

Origin
- Languages: 1. Irish; 2. Scottish Gaelic
- Origin: 1. Caitríona; 2. Catrìona

Other names
- Cognate: Katherine
- See also: Caitríona

Catriona is a feminine given name in the English language. It is an Anglicisation of the Irish Caitríona or Scottish Gaelic Catrìona, which are forms of the English Katherine.

== Notable people ==
=== Caitríona ===
- Caitríona Balfe (born 1979), Irish actress and former model
- Catríona Cannon (born 1968), librarian and academic
- Caitríona O'Leary (born 1969), Irish singer
- Caitríona O'Reilly (born 1973), Irish poet and critic
- Caitríona Ruane (born 1962), Irish politician

=== Caitriona ===
- Caitriona Beggs (born 1977), Irish cricketer
- Caitriona Jennings (born 1980), Irish athlete
- Caitriona Reed (born 1949), American Buddhist teacher

=== Catriona ===
- Catriona Carey, Irish field hockey and camogie player
- Catriona Cuddihy (born 1986), Irish athlete
- Catriona Fallon, American rower
- Catriona Forrest (born 1984), Scottish field hockey player
- Catriona Grant, Scottish politician
- Catriona Gray (born 1994), Filipino-Australian beauty pageant titleholder who won Miss Universe 2018
- Catriona Le May Doan (born 1970), Canadian speedskater
- Catriona MacColl (born 1954), English actress
- Catriona MacDonald, traditional fiddle player from Shetland
- Catriona MacInnes, Scottish film-maker
- Catriona Matthew (born 1969), Scottish professional golfer
- Catriona Millar (born 1956), Scottish painter
- Catriona Morison (born 1986), Scottish opera singer, Winner of Cardiff Singer of the World competition 2017
- Catriona Morrison (born 1977), Scottish triathlete
- Catriona Oliver (born 1980), now Sens, Australian rower
- Catriona Power, Irish camogie player
- Catriona Rowntree (born 1971), now Pettit, Australian television presenter
- Catriona Seth (born 1964), British scholar of French literature and the history of ideas
- Catriona Shearer, Scottish journalist
- Catriona (Cat) Sparks, Australian science fiction writer, editor and publisher
- Catriona Sturton (born 1976), Canadian musician
- Catriona Ward, American-born British horror novelist
- Catriona Williams, New Zealand equestrian and tetraplegic

=== Catrìona ===
- Catrìona Lexy Chaimbeul (born 1982), Scottish writer and actor
- Catrìona Nic Fhearghais (fl. 1746), Scottish Gaelic poet
- Catrìona Shaw, Scottish artist and musician

== Other ==
- Catriona, a novel by Robert Louis Stevenson

== See also ==
- List of Irish-language given names
- List of Scottish Gaelic given names
