= List of Russian language topics =

The list of Russian language topics stores articles on grammar and other language-related topics that discuss (or should discuss) peculiarities of the Russian language (as well as of other languages) or provide examples from Russian language for these topics.

The list complements the Category:Russian language and does not overlap with it.

The "—" marks articles where the information about Russian language is inadequate or missing.

== Categories ==
- Category:Cyrillic alphabets
  - Category:Cyrillic letters
  - Category:Cyrillization
- Category:Language comparison
- Category:Russian language

== Articles ==
- Adposition
- Assimilation (linguistics) (also reasonably covered in Russian phonology)
- Barbarism (linguistics)
- Capitalization
- Clitic
- Code-switching
- Compound (linguistics)
- Consonant mutation
- Continuous and progressive aspects
- Copula
- Cyrillic script
- Diacritic
- Diminutive
- Double negative
- Expressive loan
- False cognate
- Filler (linguistics) —
- Foreign language influences in English —
- Four-letter word
- Frequentative
- Gemination
- Gender-neutrality in languages with grammatical gender
- Gobbledygook
- Grammatical aspect
- Grammatical cases:
  - Accusative case
  - Dative case
  - Genitive case
  - Instrumental case
  - Locative case
  - Nominative case
  - Prepositional case
  - Vocative case
- Grammatical mood
  - Hypothetical mood
- Hypocorism
- Iotation
- Khalyava
- Language game —
- Letter Zyu
- List of ethnic slurs
- List of offensive terms per nationality
- List of Russian federal subject name etymologies
- Malapropism#Examples in Russian language
- Measure word
- Metasyntactic variable
- Minimal pair
- Minced oath —
- Mondegreen
- Mojibake
- Morse code
  - Morse code for Russian language —
- Non-native pronunciations of English
- Palatalization
- Palindrome
- Pangram --> List of pangrams
- Patronymic
- Paschal greeting
- Piphilology
- Placeholder name (kadigan)
- Phonemes
  - Alveolar trill
  - Sibilant consonant
  - Voiceless velar fricative
- Pseudo-anglicism
- Relaxed pronunciation
- Russification
- Shibboleth —
- Slavic languages
- Stress (linguistics)
- Isochrony —
- Titlo
- T-V distinction
- Unstressed vowel —
- Untranslatability
- Zaum
