= Russian grammar =

Grammar of the Russian language

Russian grammar employs an Indo-European inflectional structure, with considerable adaptation.

Russian has a highly inflectional morphology, particularly in nominals (nouns, pronouns, adjectives and numerals). Russian literary syntax is a combination of a Church Slavonic heritage, a variety of loaned and adopted constructs, and a standardized vernacular foundation.

The spoken language has been influenced by the literary one, with some additional characteristic forms. Russian dialects show various non-standard grammatical features, some of which are archaisms or descendants of old forms discarded by the literary language.

Various terms are used to describe Russian grammar with the meaning they have in standard Russian discussions of historical grammar, as opposed to the meaning they have in descriptions of the English language; in particular, aorist, imperfect, etc., are considered verbal tenses, rather than aspects, because ancient examples of them are attested for both perfective and imperfective verbs. Russian also places the accusative case between the dative and the instrumental, and in the tables below, the accusative case appears between the nominative and genitive cases.

== Nouns ==
Nominal declension involves six main cases – nominative, genitive, dative, accusative, instrumental, and prepositional – in two numbers (singular and plural), and grammatical gender (masculine, feminine, and neuter). Up to ten additional cases are identified in linguistics textbooks, although all of them are either incomplete (do not apply to all nouns) or degenerate (appear identical to one of the six main cases) – the most recognized additional cases are locative, partitive and vocative. Old Russian also had a third number, the dual, but it has been lost except for its use in the nominative and accusative cases with the numbers 1½, 2, 3 and 4 (e.g. полтора часа "an hour and a half", два стула "two chairs"), where it is now reanalyzed as genitive singular.

Russian has some nouns that only appear in the singular form (singulare tantum), for example: малина, природа; also, approximately 600 words appear only in the plural form (plurale tantum): деньги, ножницы.

More often than in many other Indo-European languages, Russian noun cases may supplant the use of prepositions entirely. Furthermore, every preposition is exclusively used with a particular case (or cases). Their usage can be summarised as:

- nominative (имени́тельный):
  - main subject;
  - default case to use outside sentences (dictionary entries, signs, etc.);
  - prepositions: за '(what) kind of?'; в: 'join the ranks of' (with plural nouns only);
- accusative (вини́тельный):
  - direct object;
  - some time expressions;
  - prepositions indicating motion: в 'into, in(ward)', на 'onto (the top of)', за 'behind, after', под 'under';
  - other prepositions: про 'about', через 'over, through', сквозь 'through';
- genitive (роди́тельный):
  - possession – 'of' (genitive noun);
  - numerals and quantifiers;
  - negated verbs (which take direct objects in accusative) to indicate total absence;
  - some time expressions;
  - prepositions: без 'without', вместо 'instead of', возле 'near', вокруг 'around', впереди 'ahead of', для 'for', до 'before', из 'from', из-за 'because of, from behind', от 'from', кроме 'except for', мимо 'past by', около 'near', после 'after', против 'against, opposite', среди 'among', у 'by', близ 'near', вдоль 'along', вне 'out of, outside', внутри 'inside';
  - verbs: бояться 'afraid of', достигать 'reach', избегать 'avoid';
  - adjectives: полный 'full of' (genitive noun);
- dative (да́тельный):
  - indirect object – 'to' (dative noun);
  - some time expressions;
  - impersonal clauses: мне холодно – 'I am cold', lit. "to_me (is) cold";
  - age statements: мне двадцать лет – 'I am 20 (years old)', lit. 'to_me (is) 20 years';
  - prepositions: по 'on', к 'to(wards)', благодаря 'thanks to';
  - auxiliaries: нужно or надо 'need/must (to)', можно 'allowed', нельзя 'forbidden';
  - verbs: верить 'believe', помочь 'help', советовать 'advise', звонить 'call', удивить(ся) 'amaze (self)';
- instrumental (твори́тельный):
  - instrument used in the action or means by which action is carried out – 'by' (I. noun);
  - logical subject of passive clause: письмо написано Иваном – 'the letter was written by Ivan';
  - secondary direct object: его считают студентом – 'he is considered (to be) a student';
  - durational time expressions;
  - verbs: интересовать(ся) 'interest (to be interested in)', пользоваться 'use', занимать(ся) 'occupy (to be preoccupied with)';
  - associates of connective verbs: быть 'be', стать 'became', остаться 'remain', казаться 'appear to be', оказаться 'turn out to be';
  - prepositions of position: за 'behind', перед 'in front of', над 'above', под 'below', между 'between', (вместе) с '(together) with';
  - adjective: довольный 'pleased by';
- prepositional (предло́жный):
  - prepositions of place: в 'inside', на 'on (top of)';
  - other prepositions: о 'about', при 'by/of/with';

Definite and indefinite articles (corresponding to 'the', 'a', 'an' in English) do not exist in the Russian language. The sense conveyed by such articles can be determined in Russian by context. However, Russian also utilizes other means of expressing whether a noun is definite or indefinite:

- The use of a direct object in the genitive instead of the accusative in negation signifies that the noun is indefinite, compare: Я не ви́жу кни́ги ("I don't see a book" or "I don't see any books") and Я не ви́жу кни́гу ("I don't see the book").
- The same goes for certain verbs expressing a desire to achieve something: wait, wish, ask, want, etc. When the inanimate object is definite (certain, or at least expected), the accusative is used; when it is indefinite (uncertain), the genitive is used. Compare: Я жду автобус ("I'm waiting for the bus", а specific, scheduled bus) and Я жду автобуса ("I'm waiting for a bus", any bus, if one will come).
- The use of the numeral one sometimes signifies that the noun is indefinite, e.g.: Почему́ ты так до́лго? – Да так, встре́тил одного́ дру́га, пришло́сь поговори́ть ("Why did you take so long?" – "Well, I met one [=a] friend and had to talk").
- Word order may also be used for this purpose; compare В ко́мнату вбежа́л ма́льчик ("Into the room rushed a boy") and Ма́льчик вбежа́л в ко́мнату ("The boy rushed into the room").
- The plural form may signify indefiniteness: Вы мо́жете купи́ть э́то в магази́нах ("You can buy this in shops") vs. Вы мо́жете купи́ть э́то в магази́не ("You can buy this in the shop").

The category of animacy is relevant in Russian nominal and adjectival declension. Specifically, the accusative has two possible forms in many paradigms, depending on the animacy of the referent. For animate referents (persons and animals), the accusative form is generally identical to the genitive form. For inanimate referents, the accusative form is identical to the nominative form. This principle is relevant for masculine singular nouns of the second declension (see below) and adjectives, and for all plural paradigms (with no gender distinction). In the tables below, this behavior is indicated by the abbreviation 'N or G' in the row corresponding to the accusative case.

Russian uses three declensions:

- The first declension is used for feminine nouns ending with -а/-я and some masculine nouns having the same form as those of feminine gender, such as па́па (papa) or дя́дя (uncle); also, common-gender nouns like зади́ра (bully) are masculine or feminine depending on the person to which they refer.
- The second declension is used for most masculine and neuter nouns.
- The third declension is used for feminine nouns ending in ь.

A group of irregular "different-declension nouns" (Russian: разносклоняемые существительные), consists of a few neuter nouns ending in -мя (e.g. время "time") and one masculine noun путь "way". However, these nouns and their forms have sufficient similarity with feminine third declension nouns that scholars such as Litnevskaya consider them to be non-feminine forms of this declension.

Nouns ending with -ий, -ия, -ие (not to be confused with nominalized adjectives) are written with -ии instead of -ие in prepositional (as this ending is never stressed, there is no difference in pronunciation): тече́ние – в ни́жнем тече́нии реки́ "streaming – in lower streaming of a river". However, if words в течение and в продолжение represent a compound preposition meaning – "while, during the time of" – they are written with -е: в тече́ние ча́са "in a time of an hour". For nouns ending in -ья, -ье, or -ьё, using -ьи in the prepositional (where endings of some of them are stressed) is usually erroneous, but in poetic speech it may be acceptable (as we replace -ии with -ьи for metric or rhyming purposes): Весь день она́ лежа́ла в забытьи́ (Fyodor Tyutchev).

=== First declension ===
==== Feminine and masculine nouns ending with а or я vowel ====
	singular	plural
nominative	-а ^{-я, -ия}	-ы ^{-и, -ии}
accusative	-у ^{-ю, -ию}	N or G
genitive	-ы ^{-и, -ии}	∅ ^{-ь, -ий}
dative	-е ^{-е, -ии}	-ам ^{-ям, -иям}
instrumental	-ой ^{-ей, -ией}	-ами ^{-ями, -иями}
prepositional	-е ^{-е, -ии}	-ах ^{-ях, -иях}

=== Second declension ===
==== Masculine nouns ending with a consonant sound ====
	singular	plural
nominative	∅ ^{-ь/-й, -ий, +ин-∅}	-ы ^{-и, -ии, -е}
accusative	N or G	
genitive	-а ^{-я, -ия, +ин-а}	-ов ^{-ей/-ев, -иев, -∅}
dative	-у ^{-ю, -ию, +ин-у}	-ам ^{-ям, -иям, -ам}
instrumental	-ом ^{-ем, -им, -ием, +ин-ом}	-ами ^{-ями, -иями, -ами}
prepositional	-е ^{-е, -ии, +ин-е}	-ах ^{-ях, -иях, -ах}

Some singular nouns denoting groups of people may include the -ин- suffix before ending.

==== Neuter nouns ====
	singular	plural
nominative	-о ^{-е}	-а ^{-я}
accusative	-о ^{-е}	N or G
genitive	-а ^{-я}	∅ ^{-й, -ей}
dative	-у ^{-ю}	-ам ^{-ям}
instrumental	-ом ^{-ем}	-ами ^{-ями}
prepositional	-е ^{-е}	-ах ^{-ях}

=== Third declension ===
==== Feminine nouns ending with letter ь ====
	singular	plural
nominative	-ь	-и
accusative	-ь	N or G ^{-и}
genitive	-и	-ей
dative	-и	-ям
instrumental	-ью ^{-ём}	-ями ^{-я́ми}
prepositional	-и	-ах ^{-ях}

==== Neuter nouns ending with мя ====
	singular	plural
nominative	-я	-ена́ ^{-ёна}
accusative	-я	-ена́ ^{-ёна}
genitive	-ени	-ён ^{-ён}
dative	-ени	-ена́м ^{-ёнам}
instrumental	-енем	-ена́ми ^{-ёнами}
prepositional	-ени	-ена́х ^{-ёнах}

==== The noun путь "way, path" ====
The noun путь is often regarded as the only third-declension masculine noun.

	singular	plural
nominative	путь	пути́
accusative	путь	пути́
genitive	пути́	путе́й
dative	пути́	путя́м
instrumental	путём	путя́ми
prepositional	пути́	путя́х

=== Indeclinable nouns ===
Some nouns (such as borrowings from other languages, abbreviations, etc.) are not modified when they change number and case. This occurs especially when the ending appears not to match any declension pattern in the appropriate gender. A few examples of indeclinable nouns are:

- Foreign words:
  - ко́фе ("coffee", masculine in literary language, neuter in colloquial);
  - пальто́ ("overcoat", neuter);
  - бюро́ ("bureau, office, desk, writing-table"; neuter);
- Abbreviations:
  - СССР ([ɛs ɛs ɛs ˈɛr] "USSR", masculine);
  - США ([sɛ ʂɛ ˈa] or [sɨ ʂ(ɨ) ˈa], "USA", plural).

=== Additional cases ===
Some nouns use several additional cases. The most important of these are:

- Locative (ме́стный): the most common minor case, used with some nouns after the prepositions of location на and в(о). With most nouns, the prepositional form is used in such instances. When there is a distinct locative, it takes the form of the dative ending but with the ending necessarily stressed. A few feminine nouns ending in ь have a locative form of independent origin, consisting of the singular genitive/dative/prepositional ending but with the ending necessarily stressed. This may mean it matches the dative, or it may take a unique form. For example, in во рту́ ("in the mouth") and в груди́ ("in the chest"), the locatives of рот ("mouth") and грудь match the dative forms ртy and (modern) груди́. In the case of рот, this differs from the prepositional ртe, but in the case of грудь the prepositional (and all other singular oblique cases besides instrumental) have merged with the locative. In в лесу́ ("in the forest") and в связи́ ("in view (of)"), the locatives of лес ("forest") and связь ("link, connection") differ from both the prepositional ле́се and свя́зи and the dative ле́сy and свя́зи (the dative and locative of лес are spelt identically but pronounced differently).
- Partitive (отдели́тельный), or second genitive: sometimes used instead of the accusative (as it should be for the direct object) to imply, that only part of the object is affected by the verb: нали́ть ча́ю "to pour some tea" (not all the tea) — from нали́ть чай "to pour the tea". This form may be also used after nouns meaning quantity: ча́шка ча́ю "a cup of tea" (also ча́шка ча́я with the standard genitive).
- Vocative (зва́тельный): used to call or speak to a person. There are two types of vocative in modern Russian. The common Slavic vocative is archaic and survives only in fixed expressions, often relating to the divinity: Бо́же мой! (My God!), Го́споди! (Good Lord!), моли́тва "О́тче наш" (the prayer "Our Father", i.e. the Lord's prayer). The modern vocative (sometimes called neo-vocative) is produced from a first-declension noun by removing the vowel ending: мам, ты меня слышишь? "mom, can you hear me?" from ма́ма. It can only be applied to familiar (affectionate) terms for family members or close friends and diminutives of commonly used Slavic names: Ива́н (full name) — Ва́ня (short, affectionate) — Вань (neo-vocative); Мари́я — Ма́ша — Маш. It is frequently used in the informal spoken language with a certain number of nouns in the plural: "ребя́т, пойдёмте!" ("guys, let's go!") from ребя́та, "девча́т, смотри́те!" ("girls, look!") from девча́та.

== Adjectives ==
A Russian adjective (и́мя прилага́тельное) is usually placed before the noun it qualifies, and it agrees with the noun in case, gender, and number. With the exception of a few invariant forms borrowed from other languages, such as беж ('beige', non-adapted form of бе́жевый) or ха́ки ('khaki-colored'), most adjectives follow one of a small number of regular declension patterns (except for some that complicate the short form). In modern Russian, the short form appears only in the nominative and is used when the adjective is in a predicative role: нов, нова́, но́во, новы́ are short forms of но́вый ('new'). Formerly (as in the bylinas) short adjectives appeared in all other forms and roles, which are not used in the modern language, but are nonetheless understandable to Russian speakers as they are declined exactly like nouns of the corresponding gender.

Adjectives may be divided into three general groups:

- qualitative (ка́чественные) – denote a quality of the object; this is the only group that usually has degrees of comparison.
- relational (относи́тельные) – denote some sort of relationship; unlikely to act as a predicate or have a short form.
- possessive (притяжа́тельные) – denote belonging to a specific subject; have some declensional peculiarities.

=== Adjectival declension ===
The pattern described below holds true for full forms of most adjectives, except possessive ones. It is also used for substantivized adjectives as учёный ("scientist, scholar" as a noun substitute or "scientific, learned" as a general adjective) and for adjectival participles. Russian differentiates between hard-stem and soft-stem adjectives, shown before and after a slash sign.

	singular			plural
	masculine	neuter	feminine	plural
nominative	-ый/-ий (-о́й)	-ое/-ее	-ая/-яя	-ые/-ие
accusative	N or G	-ое/-ее	-ую/-юю	N or G
genitive	-ого/-его		-ой/-ей	-ых/-их
dative	-ому/-ему		-ой/-ей	-ым/-им
instrumental	-ым/-им		-ой/-ей	-ыми/-ими
prepositional	-ом/-ем		-ой/-ей	-ых/-их
short form	zero ending	-о	-а	-ы/-и

- The masculine and neuter genitive singular adjectival endings -ого and -его are pronounced as -ово and -ево.
- After a sibilant (ш, ж, ч, щ) or velar (к, г, х) consonant, и is written instead of ы.
- When the stress falls on the first syllable of the ending throughout the declension, the masculine adjective ends in -ой in the nominative singular: прямо́й ([prʲɪˈmoj], "straight"), compare упря́мый ([ʊˈprʲamɨj], "stubborn").
- The "хоро́шее rule" states that after a sibilant consonant, neuter adjectives end in -ее.
- The masculine accusative singular and the accusative plural endings depend on animacy, as with nouns.
- The instrumental feminine ending -ой/-ей has the archaic alternative form -ою/-ею for all adjectives, which has only a stylistic difference.
- There are often stress changes in the short form. For example, the short forms of хоро́ший ("good") are хоро́ш (m.), хороша́ (f.), хорошо́ (n.), хороши́ (pl.), and the forms of но́вый ("new") are но́в (m.), нова́ (f.), но́во (n.), но́вы/новы́ (pl.).
- In the masculine singular short form, when a word-final consonant cluster is being formed after ending removal, an additional е or о "fleeting vowel" is inserted after the root, as in голо́дный – го́лоден ("hungry"), or у́зкий – у́зок ("narrow").
- Some adjectives (e.g. большо́й "big", ру́сский "Russian") have no short forms.

=== Comparison of adjectives ===
Comparison forms are usual only for qualitative adjectives and adverbs. Comparative and superlative synthetic forms are not part of the paradigm of original adjective but are different lexical items, since not all qualitative adjectives have them. A few adjectives have irregular forms that are declined as usual adjectives: большо́й 'big' – бо́льший 'bigger', хоро́ший 'good' – лу́чший 'better'. Most synthetically-derived comparative forms are derived by adding the suffix -е́е or -е́й to the adjective stem: кра́сный 'red' – красне́е 'redder'; these forms are difficult to distinguish from adverbs, whose comparative forms often coincide with those of their adjectival counterparts. Superlative synthetic forms are derived by adding the suffix -е́йш- or -а́йш- and additionally sometimes the prefix наи-, or using a special comparative form with the prefix наи-: до́брый 'kind' – добре́йший 'the kindest', большо́й 'big' – наибо́льший 'the biggest'.

An alternative is to add an adverb to the positive form of the adjective. The adverbs used for this are бо́лее 'more' / ме́нее 'less' and са́мый 'most' / наибо́лее 'most' / наиме́нее 'least': for example, до́брый 'kind' – бо́лее до́брый 'kinder' – са́мый до́брый 'the kindest'. This way is rarely used if special comparative forms exist.

=== Possessive adjectives ===
Possessive adjectives are less frequently used in Russian than in most other Slavic languages, but are in use. They respond to the questions чей? чья? чьё? чьи? (whose?) and denote only animate possessors. See section below for possessive adjectives relating to pronoun possessors (like English my, your, etc.).

Possessive adjectives relating to an explicit noun possessor follow two declension models:

- "Soft" possessive adjectives, often relating to an animal possessor, e.g. ры́бий "of fish", but not always, e.g. Бо́жий "God's"
- "Hard" possessive adjectives, often relating to a possessor person, but again not always, e.g. крокоди́лов "crocodile's" as in крокоди́ловы слёзы "crocodile tears".
- In both tables below, "↑ or ↓" (in the accusative) means "like the nominative with an inanimate noun, like the genitive with an animate noun";
- * (in the feminine singular) means that in the instrumental (only), the final -й may optionally be replaced by -ю, especially in poetry or in old-fashioned style

"Soft" possessive adjectives
	Masculine	Neuter	Feminine	Plural
Nominative	ры́бий	ры́бье	ры́бья	ры́бьи
Accusative	↑ or ↓	ры́бье	ры́бью	↑ or ↓
Genitive	ры́бьего		ры́бьей*	ры́бьих
Dative	ры́бьему		ры́бьей*	ры́бьим
Instrumental	ры́бьим		ры́бьей*	ры́бьими
Prepositional	ры́бьем		ры́бьей*	ры́бьих

"Hard" possessive adjectives
	Masculine	Neuter	Feminine	Plural
Nominative	крокоди́лов	крокоди́лово	крокоди́лова	крокоди́ловы
Accusative	↑ or ↓	крокоди́лово	крокоди́лову	↑ or ↓
Genitive	крокоди́лового		крокоди́ловой*	крокоди́ловых
Dative	крокоди́ловому		крокоди́ловой*	крокоди́ловым
Instrumental	крокоди́ловым		крокоди́ловой*	крокоди́ловыми
Prepositional	крокоди́ловом		крокоди́ловой*	крокоди́ловых

== Pronouns ==
=== Personal pronouns ===
	singular					plural			reflexive
	1st	2nd	3rd			1st	2nd	3rd	reflexive
	1st	2nd	neuter	masculine	feminine	1st	2nd	3rd	reflexive
English	I	you (thou)	it	he	she	we	you	they	-self
nominative	я	ты	оно́	он	она́	мы	вы	они́	
accusative	меня́	тебя́	его́		её	нас	вас	их	себя́
genitive	меня́	тебя́	его́		её	нас	вас	их	себя́
dative	мне	тебе́	ему́		ей	нам	вам	им	себе́
instrumental	мной (мно́ю)	тобо́й (тобо́ю)	им		ей (ею)	на́ми	ва́ми	и́ми	собо́й (собо́ю)
prepositional	мне	тебе́	нём		ней	нас	вас	них	себе́

- Russian is subject to the T–V distinction. The respectful form of the singular you is the same as the plural form. It begins with a capital letter: Вы, Вас, Вам, etc., in the following situations: personal letters and official papers (addressee is definite), and questionnaires (addressee is indefinite); otherwise it begins with minuscule. Compare the distinction between du and Sie in German, tu and Lei in Italian or tu and vous in French.
- When a preposition is used directly before a third-person pronoun, it is prefixed with н-: у него (read: у нево), с неё, etc. Because the prepositional case always occurs after a preposition, the third person prepositional always starts with an н-.
- There are special cases for prepositions before first person singular pronouns: со мной – "with me" (usually с), ко мне – "to me" (usually к), во мне – "in me" (usually в), обо мне – "about me" (usually о). All of these preposition forms are unstressed.
- Like adjectives and numerals, letter "г" (g) in masculine and neuter 3rd person genitive and accusative forms is pronounced as "в" (v): (н)его – (н)ево.
- English "it" can be translated as both оно́ (neuter personal pronoun) and э́то (neuter proximal demonstrative, "this"). The latter is used as a stub pronoun for a subject: э́то хорошо́ – "it/this is good", кто́ это? – "who is it/this?".

=== Demonstrative pronouns ===
этот ('this')
	masculine	neuter	feminine	plural
nominative	э́тот	э́то	э́та	э́ти
accusative	N or G	э́то	э́ту	N or G
genitive	э́того		э́той	э́тих
dative	э́тому		э́той	э́тим
instrumental	э́тим		э́той	э́тими
prepositional	э́том		э́той	э́тих

тот ('that')
	masculine	neuter	feminine	plural
nominative	тот	то	та	те
accusative	N or G	то	ту	N or G
genitive	того́		той	тех
dative	тому́		той	тем
instrumental	тем		той	те́ми
prepositional	том		той	тех

If the preposition "about" is used (usually о), for proximal demonstrative pronouns (as with any other words starting with a vowel) it is об: об э́том – about this.

=== Possessive adjectives and pronouns ===
Unlike English, Russian uses the same form for a possessive adjective and the corresponding possessive pronoun. In Russian grammar they are called possessive pronouns притяжательные местоимения (compare with possessive adjectives like Peter's = Петин or like crocodile's = крокоди́лов above). The following rules apply:

- Possessive pronouns agree with the noun of the possessed in case, gender, and number.
- The reflexive pronoun свой is used when the possessor is the subject of the clause, whatever the person, gender, and number of that subject.
- No non-reflexive exists for the third person: the genitive of the personal pronoun is instead, i.e. его for a masculine/neuter singular possessor, её for a feminine singular possessor and их for a plural possessor. But unlike other genitives used with a possessive meaning, in modern Russian these words are usually placed before the object of possession.
- Example of the difference between reflexive and non-reflexive pronouns:
  - "Он лю́бит свою́ жену́ = He loves his (own) wife" while "Он лю́бит его́ жену́ = He loves his (someone else's) wife".
- Unlike Latin where a similar rule applies for the third person only, Russian accepts using reflexives for all persons:
  - "Я люблю́ (свою́) жену́ = I love my wife"
  - "Я люблю́ себя́ = I love myself"

мой (my, mine)
	masculine	neuter	feminine	plural
nominative	мой	моё	моя́	мои́
accusative	N or G	моё	мою́	N or G
genitive	моего́		мое́й	мои́х
dative	моему́		мое́й	мои́м
instrumental	мои́м		мое́й	мои́ми
prepositional	моём		мое́й	мои́х

твой (your, yours) for a singular possessor
	masculine	neuter	feminine	plural
nominative	твой	твоё	твоя́	твои́
accusative	N or G	твоё	твою́	N or G
genitive	твоего́		твое́й	твои́х
dative	твоему́		твое́й	твои́м
instrumental	твои́м		твое́й	твои́ми
prepositional	твоём		твое́й	твои́х

свой (one's own)
	masculine	neuter	feminine	plural
nominative	свой	своё	своя́	свои́
accusative	N or G	своё	свою́	N or G
genitive	своего́		свое́й	свои́х
dative	своему́		свое́й	свои́м
instrumental	свои́м		свое́й	свои́ми
prepositional	своём		свое́й	свои́х

наш (our, ours)
	masculine	neuter	feminine	plural
nominative	наш	на́ше	на́ша	на́ши
accusative	N or G	на́ше	на́шу	N or G
genitive	на́шего		на́шей	на́ших
dative	на́шему		на́шей	на́шим
instrumental	на́шим		на́шей	на́шими
prepositional	на́шем		на́шей	на́ших

ваш (your, yours) for a plural possessor
	masculine	neuter	feminine	plural
nominative	ваш	ва́ше	ва́ша	ва́ши
accusative	N or G	ва́ше	ва́шу	N or G
genitive	ва́шего		ва́шей	ва́ших
dative	ва́шему		ва́шей	ва́шим
instrumental	ва́шим		ва́шей	ва́шими
prepositional	ва́шем		ва́шей	ва́ших

The ending -его is pronounced as -ево́.

=== Interrogative pronouns ===
кто ('who') and что ('what')
	кто	что
nominative	кто	что (read: што)
accusative	кого́ (read: ково́)	что (read: што)
genitive	кого́ (read: ково́)	чего́ (read: чево́)
dative	кому́	чему́
instrumental	кем	чем
prepositional	ком	чём

These interrogatives are used by scholars to denote "usual" questions for correspondent grammatical cases (prepositional is used with о): (кто?) Ма́ша лю́бит (кого?) Ва́сю – (who?) Masha [N.] loves (whom?) Vasya [G.].

чей ('whose')
	masculine	neuter	feminine	plural
nominative	чей	чьё	чья	чьи
accusative	N or G	чьё	чью	N or G
genitive	чьего́		чьей	чьих
dative	чьему́		чьей	чьим
instrumental	чьим		чьей	чьи́ми
prepositional	чьём		чьей	чьих

The ending "-его" is pronounced as "-ево".

== Numerals ==
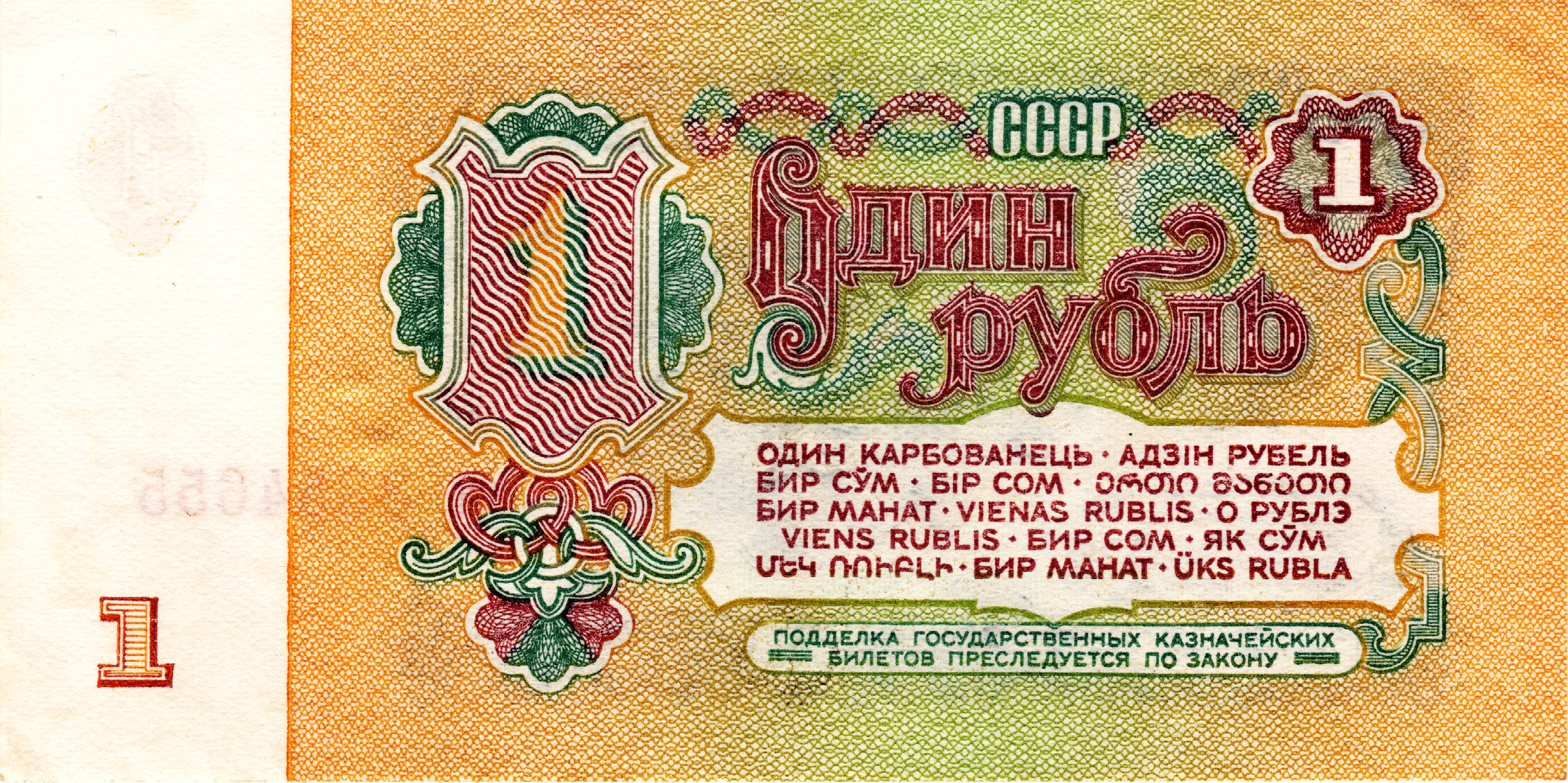
Nouns are used in the nominative case after "one" (один рубль, 'one ruble').

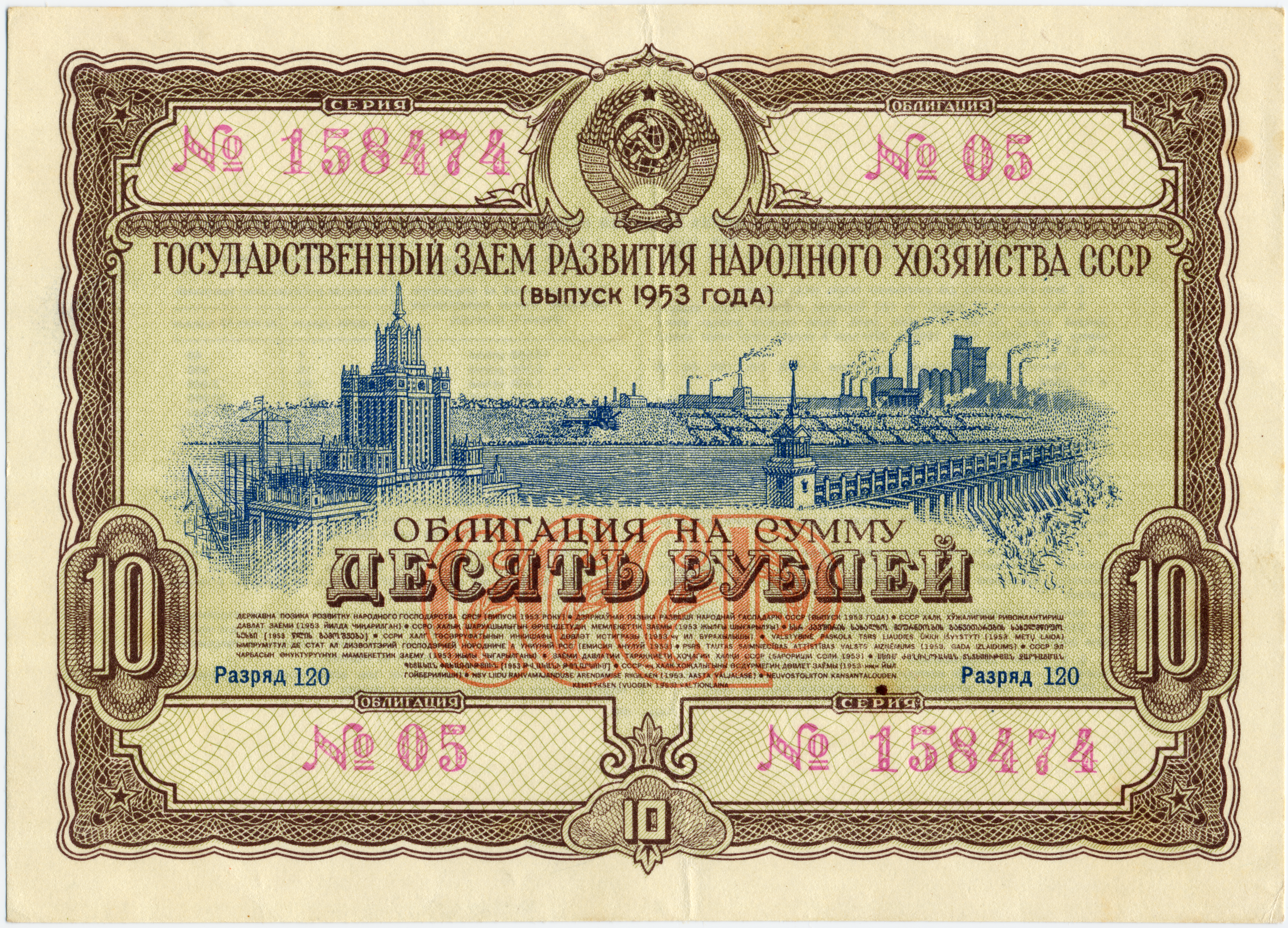
After certain other numbers (following grammatical number rules in Russian) nouns must be declined to genitive plural (десять рублей, 'ten rubles').

Russian has several classes of numerals ([имена] числительные): cardinal, ordinal, collective, and also fractional constructions; also it has other types of words, relative to numbers: collective adverbial forms (вдвоём), multiplicative (двойной) and counting-system (двоичный) adjectives, some numeric-pronominal and indefinite quantity words (сколько, много, несколько). Here are the numerals from 0 to 10:

	cardinal numbers	ordinal numbers (nominative case, masculine)	collective numbers
0	ноль or нуль	нулево́й	—
1	оди́н (m.), одна́ (f.), одно́ (n.), одни́ (pl.) (раз may be used when counting, a colloquial option)	пе́рвый	—
2	два (m., n.), две (f.)	второ́й	дво́е
3	три	тре́тий	тро́е
4	четы́ре	четвёртый	че́тверо
5	пять	пя́тый	пя́теро
6	шесть	шесто́й	ше́стеро
7	семь	седьмо́й	се́меро
8	во́семь	восьмо́й	(во́сьмеро)
9	де́вять	девя́тый	(де́вятеро)
10	де́сять	деся́тый	(де́сятеро)

== Verbs ==
Grammatical conjugation is subject to three persons in two numbers and two simple tenses (present/future and past), with periphrastic forms for the future and subjunctive, as well as imperative forms and present/past participles, distinguished by adjectival and adverbial usage (see adjectival participle and adverbial participle). Verbs and participles can be reflexive, i.e. have reflexive suffix -ся/-сь appended after ending.

The past tense form of verbs agrees with the grammatical gender of the subject. This is due to its origins as a participle, which in earlier stages of Russian was paired with the present tense of the copula быть [bɨtʲ] ("to be") to form a periphrastic perfect tense. In modern Russian, the copula has mostly disappeared; as such, the participle has come to stand on its own and has been integrated into the conjugational pattern.

Verbal inflection is considerably simpler than in Old Russian. The ancient aorist, imperfect, and (periphrastic) pluperfect have been lost, though the aorist sporadically occurs in secular literature as late as the second half of the eighteenth century, and survives as an odd form in direct narration (а он пойди да скажи [ɐ on pɐjˈdʲi də skɐˈʐɨ], etc., exactly equivalent to the English colloquial "so he goes and says"), recategorized as a usage of the imperative. The loss of three of the former six tenses has been offset by the development, as in other Slavic languages, of verbal aspect (вид). Most verbs come in pairs, one with imperfective (несоверше́нный вид) or continuous, the other with perfective (соверше́нный вид) or completed aspect, usually formed with a (prepositional) prefix, but occasionally using a different root. E.g., спать [spatʲ] ('to sleep') is imperfective; поспать [pɐˈspatʲ] ('to take a nap') is perfective.

The present tense of the verb быть is today normally used only in the third-person singular form, есть, which is often used for all the persons and numbers. As late as the nineteenth century, the full conjugation, which today is extremely archaic, was somewhat more natural: forms occur in the Synodal Bible, in Dostoevsky and in the bylinas (былины [bɨˈlʲinɨ]) or oral folk-epics, which were transcribed at that time. The paradigm shows as well as anything else the Indo-European affinity of Russian:

English	Archaic Russian	Latin	Ancient Greek	Sanskrit	Gothic
"I am"	(есмь) [jesʲmʲ]	sum [sũː]	εἰμί [eːmí]	अस्मि [ˈɐsmi]	𐌹𐌼 [im]
"you are" (sing.)	(еси́) [jɪˈsʲi]	es [ɛs]	εἶ [êː]	असि [ˈɐsi]	𐌹𐍃 [is]
"he, she, it is"	есть [jesʲtʲ]	est [ɛst]	ἐστί(ν) [estí(n)]	अस्ति [ˈɐsti]	𐌹𐍃𐍄 [ist]
"we are"	(есмы́) [jɪˈsmɨ]	sumus [ˈsʊmʊs]	ἐσμέν [esmén]	स्मः [smɐh]	𐍃𐌹𐌾𐌿𐌼 [ˈsijum]
"you are" (plural)	(е́сте) [ˈjesʲtʲɪ]	estis [ˈɛstɪs]	ἐστέ [esté]	स्थ [stʰɐ]	𐍃𐌹𐌾𐌿𐌸 [ˈsijuθ]
"they are"	(суть) [sutʲ]	sunt [sʊnt]	εἰσί(ν) [eːsí(n)]	सन्ति [ˈsɐnti]	𐍃𐌹𐌽𐌳 [sind]

=== Infinitive ===
The infinitive is the basic form of a verb for most purposes of study. In Russian it has the suffix -ть/-ти (the latter is used after consonants), or ends with -чь (which comes from fusion of the final consonant of the stem and the suffix: -к- + -ть or -г- + -ть). For reflexive verbs -ся/-сь suffix is added in the end. Note that due to phonological effects, both -ться and -тся endings (latter is used for present-future tense of a 3rd person reflexive verb; see below) are pronounced as [t͡sə] or [tsə] and often cause misspellings even among native speakers.

=== Present-future tense ===
Future tense has two forms: simple and compound.

- Future simple forms are formed by perfective verbs with the help of personal endings: "She will read" (She will have read) — "Она́ прочита́ет/прочтёт"; "She will do some reading" (She will be reading [for a certain amount of time]) — "Она́ почита́ет".
- Future compound forms are formed by imperfective verbs: a future simple tense form of the verb "быть" (to be) and the infinitive of an imperfective verb. The Russian compound future tense is similar in structure to the English future progressive tense and is used to indicate that something will be in progress at a particular moment in the future: She will be reading — "Она́ бу́дет чита́ть", without any assurance that an action will be completed, as opposed to using a perfective verb to refer to an action that is expected to be completed in the future: "Она́ прочтёт" — "She will read / She will have read".

	First conjugation	Second conjugation
1st singular	-у or -ю	-у or -ю
2nd singular	-ешь	-ишь
3rd singular	-ет	-ит
1st plural	-ем	-им
2nd plural	-ете	-ите
3rd plural	-ут or -ют	-ат or -ят

- -у/-ут,-ат is used after a hard consonant or ж, ш, щ or ч; otherwise -ю/-ют,-ят is used.
- A mutating final consonant may entail a change in the ending.
- е becomes ё when stressed.

Two forms are used to conjugate the present tense of imperfective verbs and the future tense of perfective verbs.

The first conjugation is used in verb stems ending in:

- a consonant,
- -у,-ы or -о,-я
- -е (In addition to below)
- Бить, пить, жить, шить, лить, вить, гнить, брить, стелить, зиждить.
- -а not preceded by a hush (ж, ш, щ or ч):

The second conjugation involves verb stems ending in:

- -и or -е (Глядеть, смотреть, видеть, ненавидеть, обидеть, зависеть, терпеть, вертеть, пыхтеть, сидеть, лететь, гудеть, гореть, сопеть, дудеть, блестеть, храпеть, смердеть, хрипеть, шелестеть, хрустеть, сипеть, кишеть, бдеть, звенеть, кряхтеть, кипеть, корпеть, зудеть, скорбеть, тарахтеть, шуметь, зреть, висеть, греметь, шипеть)
- -а preceded by a hush (ж, ш, щ or ч) (Слышать, дышать, держать, лежать, дребезжать, жужжать, брюзжать, дрожать, бренчать, стучать, мычать, кричать, молчать, рычать, мчать, урчать, звучать, бурчать, ворчать, торчать, журчать, гнать):
- Стоять, бояться

Example: попро-с-ить – попро-ш-у, попро-с-ят [pəprɐˈsʲitʲ, pəprɐˈʂu, pɐˈprosʲɪt] (to have solicited – [I, they] will have solicited).

==== Examples ====
First conjugation
чита́ть ('to read', stem: чита–)
я чита́ю	I read (am reading, do read)
ты чита́ешь	you read (are reading, do read)
он/она́/оно́ чита́ет	he/she/it reads (is reading, does read)
мы чита́ем	we read (are reading, do read)
вы чита́ете	you (plural/formal) read (are reading, do read)
они чита́ют	they read (are reading, do read)

First conjugation: verbs ending in -нуть
верну́ть ('to return [something]', stem: верн–)
я верну́	I will return
ты вернёшь	you will return
он/она́/оно́ вернёт	he/she/it will return
мы вернём	we will return
вы вернёте	you will return
они верну́т	they will return

First conjugation: verbs ending in -овать, -евать
рисова́ть ('to draw', stem: рису-)	плева́ть ('to spit', stem: плю-)	танцева́ть ('to dance', stem: танцу-)
я рису́ю	я плюю́	я танцу́ю
ты рису́ешь	ты плюёшь	ты танцу́ешь
он/она́/оно́ рису́ет	он/она́/оно́ плюёт	он/она́/оно́ танцу́ет
мы рису́ем	мы плюём	мы танцу́ем
вы рису́ете	вы плюёте	вы танцу́ете
они́ рису́ют	они́ плюю́т	они́ танцу́ют

First conjugation: verbs ending in -чь
мочь ('to be able', stem: мог-/мож-)		печь ('to bake', stem: пек-/печ-)	
я могу́	I can	я пеку́	I bake
ты мо́жешь	you can	ты печёшь	you bake
он/она́/оно́ мо́жет	he/she/it can	он/она́/оно́ печёт	he/she/it bakes
мы мо́жем	we can	мы печём	we bake
вы мо́жете	you (pl.) can	вы печёте	you (pl.) bake
они́ мо́гут	they can	они́ пеку́т	they bake

First conjugation (verbs ending in -сти, -сть)
нести́ ('to carry', stem: нес-)		вести́ ('to lead', stem: вед-)		мести́ ('to sweep', stem: мет-)		грести́ ('to row', stem: греб-)		красть ('to steal', stem: крад-)	
я несу́	I carry	я веду́	I lead	я мету́	I sweep	я гребу́	I row	я краду́	I steal
ты несёшь	you carry	ты ведёшь	you lead	ты метёшь	you sweep	ты гребёшь	you row	ты крадёшь	you steal
он/она́/оно́ несёт	he/she/it carries	он/она́/оно́ ведёт	he/she/it leads	он/она́/оно́ метёт	he/she/it sweeps	он/она́/оно́ гребёт	he/she/it rows	он/она́/оно́ крадёт	he/she/it steals
мы несём	we carry	мы ведём	we lead	мы метём	we sweep	мы гребём	we row	мы крадём	we steal
вы несёте	you (pl.) carry	вы ведёте	you (pl.) lead	вы метёте	you (pl.) sweep	вы гребёте	you (pl.) row	вы крадёте	you (pl.) steal
они́ несу́т	they carry	они́ веду́т	they lead	они́ мету́т	they sweep	они́ гребу́т	they row	они́ краду́т	they steal

First conjugation (verbs ending in -зти, -зть)
везти́ ('to convey', stem: вез-)		лезть ('to climb', stem: лез-)	
я везу́	I convey	я ле́зу	I climb
ты везёшь	you convey	ты ле́зешь	you climb
он/она́/оно́ везёт	he/she/it conveys	он/она́/оно́ ле́зет	he/she/it climbs
мы везём	we convey	мы ле́зем	we climb
вы везёте	you (pl.) convey	вы ле́зете	you (pl.) climb
они́ везу́т	they convey	они́ ле́зут	they climb

First conjugation: verbs ending in -ыть
мыть ('to wash', stem: мо-)
я мо́ю	I wash
ты мо́ешь	you wash
он/она́/оно́ мо́ет	he/she/it washes
мы мо́ем	we wash
вы мо́ете	you (pl.) wash
они́ мо́ют	they wash

First conjugation (verbs бить, вить, лить, пить, шить)
бить ('to beat', stem: бь-)		вить ('to weave', stem: вь-)		лить ('to pour', stem: ль-)		пить ('to drink', stem: пь-)		шить ('to sew', stem: шь-)	
я бью	I beat	я вью	I weave	я лью	I pour	я пью	I drink	я шью	I sew
ты бьёшь	you beat	ты вьёшь	you weave	ты льёшь	you pour	ты пьёшь	you drink	ты шьёшь	you sew
он/она́/оно́ бьёт	he/she/it beats	он/она́/оно́ вьёт	he/she/it weaves	он/она́/оно́ льёт	he/she/it pours	он/она́/оно́ пьёт	he/she/it drinks	он/она́/оно́ шьёт	he/she/it sews
мы бьём	we beat	мы вьём	we weave	мы льём	we pour	мы пьём	we drink	мы шьём	we sew
вы бьёте	you (pl.) beat	вы вьёте	you (pl.) weave	вы льёте	you (pl.) pour	вы пьёте	you (pl.) drink	вы шьёте	you (pl.) sew
они́ бьют	they beat	они́ вьют	they weave	они́ льют	they pour	они́ пьют	they drink	они шьют	they sew

First conjugation (verbs жить, плыть, слыть)
жить ('to live', stem: жив-)		плыть ('to swim', stem: плыв-)		слыть ('to pass for', stem: слыв-)	
я живу́	I live	я плыву́	I swim	я слыву́	I pass for
ты живёшь	you live	ты плывёшь	you swim	ты слывёшь	you pass for
он/она́/оно́ живёт	he/she/it lives	он/она́/оно́ плывёт	he/she/it swims	он/она́/оно́ слывёт	he/she/it passes for
мы живём	we live	мы плывём	we swim	мы слывём	we pass for
вы живёте	you (pl.) live	вы плывёте	you (pl.) swim	вы слывёте	you (pl.) pass for
они́ живу́т	they live	они́ плыву́т	they swim	они́ слыву́т	they pass for

Second conjugation
говори́ть ('to speak', stem: говор-)
я говорю́	I speak (am speaking, do speak)
ты говори́шь	you speak (are speaking, do speak)
он/она́/оно́ говори́т	he/she/it speaks (is speaking, does speak)
мы говори́м	we speak (are speaking, do speak)
вы говори́те	you (plural/formal) speak (are speaking, do speak)
они говоря́т	they speak (are speaking, do speak)

Second conjugation (verbs ending in -бить, -вить, -пить, -мить)
люби́ть ('to love', stem: люб-)		лови́ть ('to catch', stem: лов-)		топи́ть ('to sink', stem: топ-)		корми́ть ('to feed', stem: корм-)	
я люблю́	I love	я ловлю́	I catch	я топлю́	I sink	я кормлю́	I feed
ты лю́бишь	you love	ты ло́вишь	you catch	ты то́пишь	you sink	ты ко́рмишь	you feed
он́/она́/оно́ лю́бит	he/she/it loves	он́/она́/оно́ ло́вит	he/she/it catches	он́/она́/оно́ то́пит	he/she/it sinks	он́/она́/оно́ ко́рмит	he/she/it feeds
мы лю́бим	we love	мы ло́вим	we catch	мы то́пим	we sink	мы ко́рмим	we feed
вы лю́бите	you (pl.) love	вы ло́вите	you (pl.) catch	вы то́пите	you (pl.) sink	вы ко́рмите	you (pl.) feed
они́ лю́бят	they love	они́ ло́вят	they catch	они́ то́пят	they sink	они́ ко́рмят	they feed

Second conjugation (verbs ending in -сить, -зить, -тить, -дить, -стить)
проси́ть ('to ask', stem: прос-)		вози́ть ('to convey', stem: воз-)		плати́ть ('to pay', stem: плат-)		ходи́ть ('to go [to walk]', stem: ход-)		прости́ть ('to forgive', stem: прост-)	
я прошу́	I ask	я вожу́	I convey	я плачу́	I pay	я хожу́	I go (walk)	я прощу́	I forgive
ты про́сишь	you ask	ты во́зишь	you convey	ты пла́тишь	you pay	ты хо́дишь	you go (walk)	ты прости́шь	you forgive
он/она́/оно́ про́сит	he/she/it asks	он/она́/оно́ во́зит	he/she/it conveys	он/она́/оно́ пла́тит	he/she/it pays	он/она́/оно́ хо́дит	he/she/it goes (walks)	он/она́/оно́ прости́т	he/she/it forgives
мы про́сим	we ask	мы во́зим	we convey	мы пла́тим	we pay	мы хо́дим	we go (walk)	мы прости́м	we forgive
вы про́сите	you (pl.) ask	вы во́зите	you (pl.) convey	вы пла́тите	you (pl.) pay	вы хо́дите	you (pl.) go (walk)	вы прости́те	you (pl.) forgive
они́ про́сят	they ask	они́ во́зят	they convey	они́ пла́тят	they pay	они́ хо́дят	they go (walk)	они́ простя́т	they forgive

There are five irregular verbs:

- бежа́ть (run), бре́зжить (glimmer) – first conjugation in the plural third person, second in other forms;
- хоте́ть (want) – first conjugation in the singular, second in plural;
- дать (give) – дам, дашь, даст, дади́м, дади́те, даду́т;
- есть (eat) – ем, ешь, ест, еди́м, еди́те, едя́т.

=== Past tense ===
The Russian past tense is gender specific: –л for masculine singular subjects, –ла for feminine singular subjects, –ло for neuter singular subjects, and –ли for plural subjects. This gender specificity applies to all persons; thus, to say "I slept", a male speaker would say я спал, while a female speaker would say я спала́.

==== Examples ====
Past of сде́лать ('to do', 'to make')
masculine		feminine		neuter		plural	
я сде́лал	I made (says a man)	я сде́лала	I made (says a woman)			мы сде́лали	we made
ты сде́лал	you made (is said to a man)	ты сде́лала	you made (is said to a woman)			вы сде́лали	you (pl.) made
он сде́лал	he made	она́ сде́лала	she made	оно́ сде́лало	it made	они́ сде́лали	they made

==== Exceptions ====
Verbs ending in -сти, -сть, -зти, -зть
infinitive	present stem	past
ле́зть	лез-	лез, ле́зла, ле́зло, ле́зли
нести́	нес-	нёс, несла́, несло́, несли́
везти́	вез-	вёз, везла́, везло́, везли́
вести́	вед-	вёл, вела́, вело́, вели́
мести́	мет-	мёл, мела́, мело́, мели́
грести́	греб-	грёб, гребла́, гребло́, гребли́
расти́	раст-	рос, росла́, росло́, росли́

Verbs ending in -чь
infinitive	present stem	past
мочь	мог-/мож-	мог, могла́, могло́, могли́
печь	пек-/печ-	пёк, пекла́, пекло́, пекли́

Verbs ending in -ереть
infinitive	past
умере́ть	у́мер, умерла́, у́мерло, у́мерли

The verb идти́ ('to go, to walk') and verbs ending in -йти
infinitive	past
идти́ (to go)	шёл, шла, шло, шли
уйти́ (to go away)	ушёл, ушла́, ушло́, ушли́
найти́ (to find)	нашёл, нашла́, нашло́, нашли́
пройти́ (to pass)	прошёл, прошла́, прошло́, прошли́
прийти́ (to come)	пришёл, пришла́, пришло́, пришли́
вы́йти (to go out)	вы́шел, вы́шла, вы́шло, вы́шли

The verb есть (to eat)
infinitive	past
есть	ел, е́ла, е́ло, е́ли

=== Moods ===
Russian verbs can form three moods (наклонения): indicative (изъявительное), conditional (сослагательное) and imperative (повелительное).

==== Imperative mood ====
The imperative mood second-person singular is formed from the future-present base of most verbs by adding -и (stressed ending in present-future, or if the base ends on more than one consonant), -ь (unstressed ending, base of one consonant) or -й (unstressed ending, base of vowel). The plural (including the polite на вы) second-person form is made by adding -те to the singular one: говорю 'I speak' – говори – говорите, забуду 'I shall forget' – забудь – забудьте, клею 'I glue' – клей – клейте. Some perfective verbs have a first-person plural imperative form with -те added to a similar simple future or present tense form: пойдёмте 'let us go'. Other forms can express commands in Russian; for third person, for example, the particle пусть with future can be used: Пусть они замолчат! 'Let them shut up!'.

infinitive	present stem	imperative (2nd singular)	imperative (2nd plural)
де́лать	де́ла-	де́лай	де́лайте
рисова́ть	рису-	рису́й	рису́йте
тро́нуть	трон-	тро́нь	тро́ньте
верну́ть	верн-	верни́	верни́те
ве́рить	вер-	верь	ве́рьте
люби́ть	люб-	люби́	люби́те
услы́шать	услыш-	услы́шь	услы́шьте
смотре́ть	смотр-	смотри́	смотри́те
пла́кать	плач-	плачь	пла́чьте
писа́ть	пиш-	пиши́	пиши́те
лезть	ле́з-	лезь	ле́зьте
везти́	вез-	вези́	вези́те
нести́	нес-	неси́	неси́те
вести́	вед-	веди́	веди́те
мести́	мет-	мети́	мети́те
грести́	греб-	греби́	греби́те
расти́	раст-	расти́	расти́те

==== Conditional mood ====
The conditional mood in Russian is formed by adding the particle бы after the word which marks the supposed subject into a sentence formed like in the past tense. Thus, to say "I would (hypothetically) sleep" or "I would like to sleep", a male speaker would say я спал бы (or я бы поспа́л), while a female speaker would say я спала́ бы (or я бы поспала́).

Conditional of the verb сказа́ть ('to say')
masculine		feminine		neuter		plural	
я бы сказа́л	I would say (says a male speaker)	я бы сказа́ла	I would say (says a female speaker)			мы бы сказа́ли	we would say
ты бы сказа́л	you would say (said to a male speaker)	ты бы сказа́ла	you would say (said to a female speaker)			вы бы сказа́ли	you (pl.) would say
он бы сказа́л	he would say	она́ бы сказа́ла	she would say	оно́ бы сказа́ло	it would say	они́ бы сказа́ли	they would say

Negative conditional forms
masculine		feminine		neuter		plural	
я бы не сказа́л	I wouldn't say (says a male speaker)	я бы не сказа́ла	I wouldn't say (says a female speaker)			мы бы не сказа́ли	we wouldn't say
ты бы не сказа́л	you wouldn't say (said to a male speaker)	ты бы не сказа́ла	you wouldn't say (said to a female speaker)			вы бы не сказа́ли	you (pl.) wouldn't say
он бы не сказа́л	he wouldn't say	она́ бы не сказа́ла	she wouldn't say	оно́ бы не сказа́ло	it wouldn't say	они́ бы не сказа́ли	they wouldn't say

=== Verbs of motion ===
Verbs of motion are a distinct class of verbs found in several Slavic languages. Due to the extensive semantic information they contain, Russian verbs of motion pose difficulties for non-native learners at all levels of study. Unprefixed verbs of motion, which are all imperfective, divide into pairs based on the direction of the movement (uni- or multidirectional — sometimes referred to as determinate/indeterminate or definite/indefinite). As opposed to a verb-framed language, in which path is encoded in the verb, but manner of motion typically is expressed with complements, Russian is a satellite language, meaning that these concepts are encoded in both the root of the verb and the particles associated with it, satellites. Thus, the roots of motion verbs convey the lexical information of manner of movement, e.g. walking, crawling, running, whereas prefixes denote path, e.g. motion in and out of space. (Note: Nesset (2008) applied Leonard Talmy's (1985, 2000) terms "manner" and "path" to her image schema for Russian verbs of motion.) The roots also distinguish between means of conveyance, e.g. by transport or by one's own power, and in transitive verbs, the object or person being transported. The information below provides an outline of the formation and basic usage of unprefixed and prefixed verbs of motion.

==== Unprefixed ====
Pairs of Russian verbs of motion, adapted from Muravyova (Note: Researchers have also included the reflexive verbs катиться/кататься, гнаться/гоняться, нестись/носиться, and тащиться/таскаться (Gagarina 2009: 451–452).)
English	unidirectional	multidirectional
to run	бежа́ть	бе́гать
to wander	брести́	броди́ть
to convey, transport	везти́	вози́ть
to lead	вести́	води́ть
to drive, chase	гна́ть	гоня́ть
to go by vehicle, ride	е́хать	е́здить
to go, walk	идти́	ходи́ть
to roll	кати́ть	ката́ть
to climb	ле́зть	ла́зить (ла́зать)
to fly	лете́ть	лета́ть
to carry	нести́	носи́ть
to swim, float	плы́ть	пла́вать
to crawl	ползти́	по́лзать
to drag	тащи́ть	таска́ть

==== Directionality ====
Unidirectional verbs describe motion in progress in one direction, e.g.:

- We are headed to the library.
  Мы идём в библиотеку.
- I was on my way to work.
  Я шла на работу.
- The birds are flying south.
  Птицы летят на юг.

Multidirectional verbs describe:

1. General motion, referring to ability or habitual motion, without reference to direction or destination, e.g.:
  - The child has been walking for six months.
    Ребёнок ходит шесть месяцев.
  - Birds fly, fish swim, and dogs walk.
    Птицы летают, рыбы плавают, а собаки ходят.
2. Movement in various directions, e.g.:
  - We walked around the city all day.
    Мы ходили по городу весь день.
3. Repetition of completed trips, e.g.:
  - She goes to the supermarket every week.
    Она ходит в супермаркет каждую неделю.
4. In the past tense, a single completed round trip, e.g.:
  - I went to Russia (and returned) last year.
    В прошлом году я ездил в Россию.

==== Unidirectional perfectives with по- ====
The addition of the prefix по- to a unidirectional verb of motion makes the verb perfective, denoting the beginning of a movement, i.e. 'setting out'. These perfectives imply that the agent has not yet returned at the moment of speech, e.g.,

1. He went to a friend's place (and has not returned; unidirectional perfective).
  Он пошёл к другу.
  Compare with:
2. He was on his way to a friend's place (unidirectional imperfective).
  Он шёл к другу.
3. He used to go to a friend's place (multidirectional).
  Он ходил к другу.
4. He went to a friend's place (and has returned; see prefixed perfective forms of motion verbs below).
  Он сходил к другу.

==== Going versus taking ====
Three pairs of motion verbs generally refer to 'taking', 'leading' with additional lexical information on manner of motion and object of transport encoded in the verb stem. These are нести/носить, вести/водить, and везти/возить. See below for the specific information on manner and object of transport:

1. нести/носить – 'to take (on foot), carry'
  1. He carries a briefcase.
    Он носит портфель.
  2. She is taking her assignment to class.
    Она несёт домашнее задание на занятия.
2. вести/водить – 'to take, lead (people or animals)'; 'to drive (a vehicle)'
  1. The teacher was taking the children to a field trip.
    Учитель вёл школьников на экскурсию
  2. She took her friend to the theatre.
    Она водила свою подругу в театр.
  3. She knows how to drive a car.
    Она умеет водить машину.
3. везти/возить – 'to take, drive, convey by vehicle'
  1. She is wheeling her grandmother in a wheelchair.
    Она везёт бабушку в инвалидном кресле.
  2. The train took the passengers to England (and back).
    Поезд возил пассажиров в Англию.

==== Prefixed motion verbs ====
Motion verbs combine with prefixes to form new aspectual pairs, which lose the distinction of directionality, but gain spatial or temporal meanings. The unidirectional verb serves as the base for the perfective, and the multidirectional as the base for the imperfective. In addition to the meanings conveyed by the prefix and the simplex motion verb, prepositional phrases also contribute to the expression of path in Russian. Thus, it is important to consider the whole verb phrase when examining verbs of motion.

In some verbs of motion, adding a prefix requires a different stem shape:

1. идти → -йти 'go (on foot)'
  1. For prefixes ending in a consonant, an -o- is added in all forms, e.g.: войти.
  2. й is lost in the conjugated forms of прийти, e.g.: приду 'I will come'.
2. ездить → -езжать 'go (by conveyance)' For prefixes ending in a consonant, a hard sign (ъ) is added before –ехать and –езжать, e.g.: въезжать 'enter (by conveyance)'.
3. бе́гать → -бега́ть 'run' The formation of the verb remains the same, but stress shifts from the stem to the endings, e.g.: убега́ть 'run away'.
4. пла́вать → -плыва́ть 'swim' The vowel in the root changes to -ы- and the stress shifts to the endings.
5. As with non-motion verbs, in perfective verbs with the prefix вы-, the prefix is stressed in all forms, e.g. вы́йдешь 'you will go out'.

See below for a table the prefixes, their primary meanings, and the prepositions that accompany them, adapted from Muravyova. Several examples are taken directly or modified from Muravyova.

Prefixed verbs of motion
Prefix / primary meanings	Examples / additional meanings	Prepositional Phrases
spatial
в-, во- Movement inwards across a threshold, entering Antonym: вы-	The tram stopped and the girl entered. Трамвай остановился, и девушка вошла.	в / на + acc.
вы- Movement out of something across a threshold, exiting Antonym: в-	She exited the office. Она вышла из кабинета. Other: 1. Step out for a short period of time, e.g.: The secretary left for ten minutes. Секретарь вышел на десять минут.; 2. Leave at a specific time frame, e.g.: They left early in the morning to catch their train/plane . Они выехали рано утром, чтобы успеть на поезд/самолёт.	из / с / от + gen. в / на + acc. к + dat.
при- Intended arrival, signals presence of the agent at a location as a result of motion Antonym: у-	He arrived in Moscow a week ago. Он приехал в Москву неделю назад.	в / на + acc. к + dat. из / с / от + gen.
у- Intended departure, signals absence Antonym: при-	They will leave Vladivostok in a month. Они улетят из Владивостока через месяц. Where is Igor? He already left. Где Игорь? Он уже ушёл.	в / на + acc. к + dat. из / с / от + gen.
под-, подо- Approach; Antonym: от-	He approached the girl to ask for her number. Он подошёл к девушке, чтобы спросить её номер. Other: Подвезти – give someone a lift, e.g.: He took me (as far as) downtown. Он подвёз меня до центра.	к + dat. до + gen.
от-, ото- Withdrawal a short distance away Antonym: под-	The boy stepped back from the stranger who had offered him candy. Мальчик отошёл от незнакомца, который предложил ему конфеты. Other: With transitive verbs, delivering or dropping something off (agent does not remain), e.g.: I'll drop the book off at the library, then come. Я отнесу книги в библиотеку, потом приду.	от + gen.
до- Reaching a limit or destination	The passengers reached the last station and exited the bus. Пассажиры доехали до последней остановки и вышли из автобуса. Other: Characterizing the duration of a journey, especially when it is long, e.g.: We finally reached the dacha. Мы наконец доехали до дачи.	до + gen.
за- Movement behind an object; stopping off on the way	The old woman walked behind the corner and disappeared. Старушка зашла за угол и исчезла. Other: 1. Action performed on the way to a destination, e.g.: On the way home I stopped at the store for bread. По дороге домой я зашла в магазин за хлебом 2. A short visit, e.g.: The young man often stops by his mother's place. Молодой человек часто заходит к маме.; 3. Movement deep into something, at a great distance (inside, upwards or downwards), e.g.: The ball flew onto the roof of the house. Мяч залетел на крышу дома.	в / на / за + acc. к + dat. за + inst.
про- Movement across, through, or past something	We drove through the city. Мы проехали через город. We passed the metro station. Мы прошли мимо станции метро. Other: 1. Movement beyond one's destination (possibly unintentional), e.g.: I'm afraid we already passed the store. Я боюсь, что мы уже прошли магазин.; 2. Movement forward with the distance covered specified, e.g.: You'll go three stops and get off the tram. Вы проедете три остановки и выйдете из трамвая.	сквозь / через / в + acc. мимо + gen. without preposition
пере- Movement across, from one point to another; through	The ducks swam across the river. Утки переплыли реку. Other: Changing residence, e.g.: I moved to another city. Я переехала в другой город.	через + acc without preposition + acc.
вз-, взо-, воз-, вс-, вос- Movement upwards Antonym: с-	The mountain climber walked up the mountain. Альпинист взошёл на гору.	в / на + acc.
с-, со- Movement downwards Antonym: вз-	After the performance, the actor got off the stage. После представления актёр сошёл со сцены.	c + gen. на + acc. к + dat. за + inst.
о-, об-, обо- Movement around an object or involving a consecutive number of objects, circling, covering a whole place	The little girl walked around the puddle. Девочка обошла лужу. I'm going around to all the stores in the mall. Я обхожу все магазины в центре.	вокруг + gen. without preposition + acc.
из-, изо-, ис- Movement involving the entire area concerned and carried out in all directions *only formed from multidirectional verb of motion	I traveled over the whole world. Я изъездил весь мир.	without preposition + acc.
на- Movement onto the surface of an object *only formed from multidirectional verb of motion	A cloud crept onto the sun. Туча наползла на солнце. Other: Quantified movement, e.g.: The driver covered 50 kilometers. Водитель наездил 50 километров. I had 2500 flight hours in Boeing 737. Я налетал 2500 часов на Боинге 737.	в/на + acc. without preposition + acc.
с-, со- (+сь, +ся); Convergent movement from various directions towards one center Antonym: раз-, разо-, рас- (+сь, +ся)	In order to study, the student brought all her textbooks from other rooms to her desk. Чтобы заниматься, студентка снесла все учебники из других комнат на письменный стол. The children ran (from all directions) to the playground. Дети сбежались на детскую площадь	в / на + acc. к + dat.
раз-, разо-, рас- (+сь, +ся); Divergent movement in various directions from one center Antonym: с-, со- (+сь, +ся)	Grandfather Frost brought the gifts to the (various) houses. Дед Мороз разнёс подарки по домам. After dinner, we went to our separate homes. После ужина, мы разошлись по домам.	по + dat. pl. в + асс. pl.
temporal
по- Beginning of unidirectional movement *with unidirectional verb of motion	I went to the university. Я пошла в университет. Other: 1. Intention to carry out a movement in the future, e.g.: In the winter I plan to go to Florida. Зимой я собираюсь поехать во Флориду.; 2. Approximate location of the agent at moment of speech, e.g.: Where's Dad? He went to (is at) work. Где папа? Он пошёл на работу.	в / на + acc. к + dat. из / с / от + gen. по + dat. without prep. + inst.
за- Beginning of multidirectional movement *With multidirection verb of motion	She started running around the room. Она забегала по комнате.	по + dat.
про- Prolonged multidirectional movement *with multidirectional verb of motion	We walked around the woods all day. Мы проходили по лесу весь день.	without prep + acc.
по- Slow and measured multidirectional movement *with multidirectional verb of motion	She walked around the apartment pensively and finally decided to leave. Она задумчиво походила по квартире и наконец решила уйти.	
resultative
с- Completed semelfactive movement in opposite directions, there and back. *only formed with multidirectional verb of motion	I went to the pharmacy for medicine and went to bed. Я сходил в аптеку за лекарством и лёг спать.	в / на + acc. к + dat.

===== Idiomatic uses =====
The uni- and multidirectional distinction rarely figures into the metaphorical and idiomatic use of motion verbs, because such phrases typically call for one or the other verb. See below for examples:

Idiomatic uses of motion verbs
Verb	Example
unidirectional
идти	1. It's snowing, not raining. Идёт не дождь, а снег.; 2. The clock is ticking. Часы идут.; 3. A film is on. Идёт фильм.; 4. That dress suits you. Это платье тебе идёт.; 5. The government is moving towards democracy. Правительство идёт к демократии.; 6. The president is going against the will of the people. Президент идёт против воли народа.
вести	1. The country is waging a war. Страна ведёт войну.; 2. The girl keeps a diary. Девочка ведёт дневник.; 3. The friends have been in correspondence for a long time. Друзья долго ведут переписку.; 4. The road leads to the city. Дорога ведёт в город.; 5. No good comes from lying. Ложь к добру не ведёт.
нести	1. The woman bears the responsibility of her children. Женщина несёт ответственность за детей.; 2. The farmer bears the losses from the drought. Фермер несёт потери от засухи.; 3. The criminal is undergoing severe punishment. Преступник несёт тяжёлое наказание.; 4. The speaker is talking nonsense. Оратор несёт чушь.
лететь	1. Time flies. Время летит.; 2. Shares are plummeting because of the economic crisis. Акции летят от экономического кризиса.
лезть	The hooligans are getting into a brawl. Хулиганы лезут в драку.
везти	She is lucky/got lucky. Ей везёт / повезло.
бежать	1. Blood is flowing from the wound. Кровь бежит из раны.; 2. The days fly past. Дни бегут.
multidirectional
носить	1. Ivan Ivanovich bears the name of his father. Иван Иванович носит имя отца.; 2. The clothes bear the imprint of old age. Одежда носит отпечаток ветхости.; 3. She wears pretty clothing. Она носит красивую одежду.
ходить	Rumor has it that she left her husband. Ходит слух, что она бросила мужа.
водить	He fooled me for a long time when he said that everything was fine in our firm. Он долго водил меня за нос, когда говорил, что в нашей фирме всё хорошо.
кататься	I like to ski, skate, cycle, and row. Мне нравится кататься на лыжах, на коньках, на велосипеде и на лодке.

=== Adjectival participle ===
Russian adjectival participles can be active or passive; have perfective or imperfective aspect; imperfective participles can have present or past tense, while perfective ones in classical language can be only past. As adjectives, they are declined by case, number and gender. If adjectival participles are derived from reciprocal verbs, they have suffix -ся appended after the adjectival ending; this suffix in participles never takes the short form. Participles are often difficult to distinguish from deverbal adjectives (this is important for some cases of orthography).

==== Active present participle ====
Лю́ди, живу́щие в э́том го́роде, о́чень до́брые и отве́тственные – The people living in this city are very kind and responsible.

In order to form the active present participle, the "т" of the 3rd person plural of the present tense is replaced by "щ", and a necessary adjective ending is added:

де́лать (to do, to make) – де́лают (they do/make) – де́лающий (doing, making)

Declension of де́лающий
	singular			plural
	masculine	neuter	feminine	plural
nominative	де́лающий	де́лающее	де́лающая	де́лающие
accusative	N or G	де́лающее	де́лающую	N or G
genitive	де́лающего		де́лающей	де́лающих
dative	де́лающему		де́лающей	де́лающим
instrumental	де́лающим		де́лающей	де́лающими
prepositional	де́лающем		де́лающей	де́лающих

Note: Only imperfective verbs can have an active present participle.

Examples
infinitive	3rd person plural (present Tense)	active present participle
First conjugation
име́ть (to have)	име́ют	име́ющий
писа́ть (to write)	пи́шут	пи́шущий
пря́тать (to conceal)	пря́чут	пря́чущий
рисова́ть (to draw)	рису́ют	рису́ющий
вести́ (to lead)	веду́т	веду́щий
печь (to bake)	пеку́т	пеку́щий
жить (to live)	живу́т	живу́щий
люби́ть (to love)	лю́бят	лю́бящий
коло́ть (to break)	ко́лют	ко́лющий
идти́ (to go)	иду́т	иду́щий
пить (to drink)	пьют	пью́щий
мыть (to wash)	мо́ют	мо́ющий
брить (to shave)	бре́ют	бре́ющий
петь (to sing)	пою́т	пою́щий
дава́ть (to give)	даю́т	даю́щий
жать (to press)	жмут	жмущий
тону́ть (to sink)	то́нут	то́нущий
Second conjugation
слы́шать (to hear)	слы́шат	слы́шащий
сто́ить (to cost)	сто́ят	сто́ящий
стоя́ть (to stand)	стоя́т	стоя́щий
хоте́ть (to want)	хотя́т	хотя́щий
Other verbs
бежа́ть (to run)	бегу́т	бегу́щий
есть (to eat)	едя́т	едя́щий
быть (to be)	*суть	*су́щий

(*) Note: These forms are obsolete in modern Russian and they are not used in the spoken language as forms of the verb 'to be'.

===== Reflexive verbs paradigm =====
де́лающийся – being done/being made
	singular			plural
	masculine	neuter	feminine	plural
nominative	де́лающийся	де́лающееся	де́лающаяся	де́лающиеся
accusative	N or G	де́лающееся	де́лающуюся	N or G
genitive	де́лающегося		де́лающейся	де́лающихся
dative	де́лающемуся		де́лающейся	де́лающимся
instrumental	де́лающимся		де́лающейся	де́лающимися
prepositional	де́лающемся		де́лающейся	де́лающихся

The participle agrees in gender, case and number with the word it refers to:

Я посвяща́ю э́ту пе́сню лю́дям, живу́щим в на́шем го́роде – I dedicate this song to the people living in our city.
Я горжу́сь людьми́, живу́щими в на́шем го́роде – I'm proud of the people living in our city.

==== Active past participle ====
The active past participle is used in order to indicate actions that happened in the past:

Де́вушка, чита́вшая тут кни́гу, забы́ла свой телефо́н – The girl that read this book here forgot her phone (the girl read the book in the past).

Compare:

Де́вушка, чита́ющая тут кни́гу, – моя́ сестра́ – The girl reading this book here is my sister (she is reading the book now, in the present).

In order to form the active past participle, the infinitive ending '-ть' is replaced by the suffix '-вш-' and add an adjective ending:

де́лать (to do, to make) – де́лавший

Declension of де́лавший
	singular			plural
	masculine	neuter	feminine	plural
nominative	де́лавший	де́лавшее	де́лавшая	де́лавшие
accusative	N or G	де́лавшее	де́лавшую	N or G
genitive	де́лавшего		де́лавшей	де́лавших
dative	де́лавшему		де́лавшей	де́лавшим
instrumental	де́лавшим		де́лавшей	де́лавшими
prepositional	де́лавшем		де́лавшей	де́лавших

Examples
infinitive	active past participle
име́ть (to have)	име́вший
рисова́ть (to draw)	рисова́вший
тону́ть (to drown)	тону́вший
люби́ть (to love)	люби́вший
писа́ть (to write)	писа́вший
коло́ть (to poke through with a needle)	коло́вший
бить (to hit)	би́вший
мыть (to wash)	мы́вший
дава́ть (to give)	дава́вший
жать (to squeeze/compress)	жа́вший
стать (to become)	ста́вший
жить (to live)	жи́вший

Exceptions
infinitive	past tense (masculine)	active past participle
Some verbs ending in consonant + нуть
со́хнуть (to dry)	сох	со́хший
проту́хнуть (to become rancid)	проту́х	проту́хший
сдо́хнуть (to die ("croak"))	сдох	сдо́хший
Verbs ending in -зть
лезть (to climb)	лез	ле́зший
Verbs ending in -ти
везти́ (to convey)	вёз	вёзший
вести́ (to lead)	вёл	ве́дший
нести́ (to carry)	нёс	нёсший
мести́ (to sweep)	мёл	мётший
грести́ (to row)	грёб	грёбший
расти́ (to grow)	рос	ро́сший
Verbs ending in -чь
помо́чь (to help)	помог	помо́гший
печь (to bake)	пёк	пёкший
Verbs ending in -ереть
умере́ть (to die)	у́мер	у́мерший
запере́ть (to lock)	за́пер	за́перший
стере́ть (to erase)	стёр	стёрший
The verb красть
красть (to steal)	крал	кра́вший
The verb идти́
идти́ (to go)	шёл	ше́дший

===== Reflexive verbs paradigm =====
де́лавшийся – being done/being made
	singular			plural
	masculine	neuter	feminine	plural
nominative	де́лавшийся	де́лавшееся	де́лавшаяся	де́лавшиеся
accusative	N or G	де́лавшееся	де́лавшуюся	N or G
genitive	де́лавшегося		де́лавшейся	де́лавшихся
dative	де́лавшемуся		де́лавшейся	де́лавшимся
instrumental	де́лавшимся		де́лавшейся	де́лавшимися
prepositional	де́лавшемся		де́лавшейся	де́лавшихся

==== Passive present participle ====
обсужда́ть – to discuss;
обсужда́емый (full form), обсужда́ем (short form) – being discussed or able to be discussed;

In order to form the passive present participle it is necessary to add an adjective ending to the 1st person plural of the present tense:

оставля́ть (to leave) – оставля́ем (we leave) – оставля́емый

masculine form	оставля́емый
feminine form	оставля́емая
neuter form	оставля́емое
plural form	оставля́емые

Examples
infinitive	1st person plural (present tense)	passive present participle
поздравля́ть (to congratulate)	поздравля́ем	поздравля́емый
рисова́ть (to draw [a picture])	рису́ем	рису́емый
люби́ть (to love)	лю́бим	люби́мый
гнать (to race)	го́ним	гони́мый
мыть (to wash)	мо́ем	мо́емый

Exceptions
infinitive	present stem	passive past participle
Verbs ending in -авать
узнава́ть (to discover)		узнава́емый
Verbs ending in -зть, -зти, -сть, -сти
везти́ (to carry [by cart or vehicle])	вез-	везо́мый
вести́ (to lead)	вед-	ведо́мый
нести́ (to carry [by hand])	нес-	несо́мый
мести́ (to sweep)	мет-	мето́мый
грести́ (to row)	греб-	гребо́мый
красть (to steal)	крад-	крадо́мый

Passive participles are occasional in modern Russian. Often, same meaning is conveyed by reflexive active present participles:

рису́ющийся (self-drawing) instead of рису́емый (being drawn, drawable);
мо́ющийся (self-washing) instead of мо́емый (being washed);

The forms ending in -омый are mostly obsolete. Only the forms ведо́мый (from вести́ – to lead) and иско́мый (from иска́ть – to search, to look for) are used in the spoken language as adjectives:

ведо́мый челове́к – a slave (driven, following) man;
иско́мая величина́ – the sought quantity.

==== Passive past participle ====
сде́лать – to do/to make (perfective verb)
сде́ланный – done/made

Passive past participles are formed by means of the suffixes '-нн-' or '-т-' from the infinitive stem of perfective verbs. Besides that, this kind of participle can have short forms formed by means of the suffixes '-н-' or '-т-':

написа́ть (to write) – напи́санный (written) / напи́сан (short form)

уби́ть (to kill) – уби́тый (killed) / уби́т (short form)

	full form	short form
masculine	напи́санный	напи́сан
feminine	напи́санная	напи́сана
neuter	напи́санное	напи́сано
plural	напи́санные	напи́саны

	full form	short form
masculine	уби́тый	уби́т
feminine	уби́тая	уби́та
neuter	уби́тое	уби́то
plural	уби́тые	уби́ты

Participle-forming models (for perfect verbs)
infinitive	participle	short forms
Verbs in -ать, -ять, -еть with a present stem ending in a vowel
сде́лать (to do, do make)	сде́ланный	сде́лан
поменя́ть (to change)	поме́нянный	поме́нян
нарисова́ть (to draw)	нарисо́ванный	нарисо́ван
услы́шать (to hear)	услы́шанный	услы́шан
написа́ть (to write)	напи́санный	напи́сан
погреба́ть (to bury)	погребённый	погребён, погребена́, погребено́, погребены́
Verbs ending in -ить and -еть referred to the second conjugation
пожа́рить (to fry)	пожа́ренный	пожа́рен
уви́деть (to see)	уви́денный	уви́ден
оби́деть (to offend)	оби́женный	оби́жен
оплати́ть (to pay)	опла́ченный	опла́чен
порази́ть (to amaze)	поражённый	поражён, поражена́, поражено́, поражены́
спроси́ть (to ask)	спро́шенный	спро́шен
прости́ть (to forgive)	прощённый	прощён, прощена́, прощено́, прощены́
проломи́ть (to break in)	проло́мленный	проло́млен
установи́ть (to install, to set up)	устано́вленный	устано́влен
истреби́ть (to exterminate)	истреблённый	истреблён, истреблена́, истреблено́, истреблены́
купи́ть (to buy)	ку́пленный	ку́плен
Verbs ending in -зть, -сть, -зти or -сти
сгрызть (to chew)	сгры́зенный	сгры́зен
укра́сть (to steal)	укра́денный	укра́ден
проче́сть (to read)	прочтённый	прочтён, прочтена́, прочтено́, прочтены́
увезти́ (to drive away)	увезённый	увезён, увезена́, увезено́, увезены́
увести́ (to take away)	уведённый	уведён, уведена́, уведено́, уведены́
подмести́ (to sweep)	подметённый	подметён, подметена́, подметено́, подметены́
унести́ (to carry away)	унесённый	унесён, унесена́, унесено́, унесены́
Verbs ending in -чь
испе́чь (to bake)	испечённый	испечён, испечена́, испечено́, испечены́
сбере́чь (to save)	сбережённый	сбережён, сбережена́, сбережено́, сбережены́
Verbs ending in -йти
найти́ (to find)	на́йденный	на́йден
Verbs ending in -нуть
согну́ть (to bend)	со́гнутый	со́гнут
Verbs ending in -оть
уколо́ть (to prick)	уко́лотый	уко́лот
Verbs ending in -ыть
намы́ть (to wash)	намы́тый	намы́т
забы́ть (to forget)	забы́тый	забы́т
Verbs ending in бить, вить, лить, пить, шить
уби́ть (to kill)	уби́тый	уби́т

=== Adverbial participle ===
Adverbial participles (деепричастия) express an earlier or simultaneous action providing context for the sentence in which they occur, similar to the English constructions "having done X" or "while doing Y".

Like normal adverbs, adverbial participles are not declined. They inherit the aspect of their verb; imperfective ones are usually present, while perfective ones can only be past (since they denote action performed by the subject, the tense corresponds to the time of action denoted by the verb). Adverbial participles are usually active, but passive constructions may be formed using adverbial participle forms of the verb быть (present будучи "being", very rarely past бывши "having been"); these may be combined with either an adjectival participle in the instrumental case (Будучи раненным, боец оставался в строю – Being wounded, the combatant remained in the row), or a short adjective in the nominative (Бывши один раз наказан, он больше так не делал – Having been punished once, he didn't do it any more).

Present adverbial participles are formed by adding the suffix -а/-я (or sometimes -учи/-ючи, which is usually deprecated) to the stem of the present tense. A few past adverbial participles (mainly of intransitive verbs of motion) are formed in the same way, but most are formed with the suffix -в (alternative form -вши, always used before -сь), some whose stem ends with a consonant, with -ши. For reflexive verbs, the suffix -сь remains at the very end of the word; in poetry it can take the form -ся.

In standard Russian, adverbial participles are considered a feature of bookish speech; in colloquial language they are usually replaced with single adjectival participles or constructions with verbs: Пообедав, я пошёл гулять ("Having eaten, I went for a walk") → Я пообедал и пошёл гулять ("I ate and went for a walk"). But in some conservative dialects, adverbial and adjectival participles may be used to produce perfect forms, which do not occur in standard Russian; e.g. "I haven't eaten today" will be "Я сегодня не евши" instead of "Я сегодня не ел".

Adverbial participles
infinitive	present tense	present adverbial participle	past adverbial participle
думать (to think, impf.)	думаю	думая	(думав) (Note: Rare but existing forms; they appear e.g. in negative sentences: как Он знает Писания, не учившись? (John 7:15).)
сказать (to say, pf.)	—		сказав (сказавши)
учиться (to be learning, impf.)	учусь	учась	(учившись)
научиться (to learn, pf.)	—		научившись
войти (to enter, pf.)	—		войдя (вошед, (Note: Deprecated irregular form.) вошедши)
сплести (to weave, pf.)	—		сплётши (сплетя)
ехать (to ride/to drive, impf.)	еду	(ехав, ехавши)	(едучи) (Note: Described by investigators other than Zaliznyak as still alive and neutral -учи form.)

=== Irregular verbs ===
Russian verb paradigm
		дать	есть	идти́
English		give (pf.)	eat	go
Present	1st singular	дам	ем	иду́
Present	2nd singular	дашь	ешь	идёшь
Present	3rd singular	даст	ест	идёт
Present	1st plural	дади́м	еди́м	идём
Present	2nd plural	дади́те	еди́те	идёте
Present	3rd plural	даду́т	едя́т	иду́т
Past	masculine feminine neuter plural	дал дала́ да́ло, дало́ да́ли	ел е́ла е́ло е́ли	шёл шла шло шли
Imperative	singular	дай	ешь	иди́
Imperative	plural	да́йте	е́шьте	иди́те
Active Participle	present	даю́щий	едя́щий	иду́щий
Active Participle	past	да́вший	е́вший	ше́дший
Past passive participle		да́нный	съе́денный	–
Past passive participle (short forms)	masculine feminine neuter plural	дан дана́ дано́ даны́	съе́ден съе́дена съе́дено съе́дены	–
Adverbial Participle	present	–	едя́	идя́
Adverbial Participle	past	дав, да́вши	ев	ше́дши

== Word formation ==
Russian has on hand a set of prefixes, prepositional and adverbial in nature, as well as diminutive, augmentative, and frequentative suffixes. All of these can be stacked one upon the other to produce multiple derivatives of a given word. Participles and other inflectional forms may also have a special connotation. For example:

мы́сль	[ˈmɨs⁽ʲ⁾lʲ]	"thought"
мысли́шка	[mɨˈs⁽ʲ⁾lʲiʂkə]	"a petty, cute or a silly thought; thoughtlet"
мысли́ща	[mɨˈs⁽ʲ⁾lʲiɕːə]	"a thought of fundamental import"
мышле́ние	[mɨˈʂlʲenʲɪje]	"thought, abstract thinking, reasoning"
мы́слить	[ˈmɨs⁽ʲ⁾lʲɪtʲ]	"to think (as to cogitate)"
мы́слящий	[ˈmɨs⁽ʲ⁾lʲɪɕːɪj]	"thinking, intellectual" (adjective)
мы́слимый	[ˈmɨs⁽ʲ⁾lʲɪmɨj]	"conceivable, thinkable"
мы́сленно	[ˈmɨs⁽ʲ⁾lʲɪn(ː)ə]	"mentally, in a mental manner"
смы́сл	[ˈsmɨsl]	"meaning" (noun)
осмы́слить	[ɐˈsmɨs⁽ʲ⁾lʲɪtʲ]	"to comprehend, to conceive; to grasp" (perfect)
осмы́сливать	[ɐˈsmɨs⁽ʲ⁾lʲɪvətʲ]	"to be in the process of comprehending" (continuous)
переосмы́слить	[pʲɪrʲɪɐˈsmɨs⁽ʲ⁾lʲɪtʲ]	"to reassess, to reconsider"
переосмы́сливать	[pʲɪrʲɪɐˈsmɨs⁽ʲ⁾lʲɪvətʲ]	"to be in the process of reassessing (something)"
переосмы́сливаемые	[pʲɪrʲɪɐˈsmɨs⁽ʲ⁾lʲɪvəjɪmɨje]	"(something or someone plural) in the process of being reconsidered"
бессмы́слица	[bʲɪˈsmɨs⁽ʲ⁾lʲɪtsə]	"nonsense"
обессмы́слить	[ɐbʲɪˈsmɨs⁽ʲ⁾lʲɪtʲ]	"to render meaningless"
бессмы́сленный	[bʲɪˈsmɨs⁽ʲ⁾lʲɪnːɨj]	"meaningless"
обессмы́сленный	[ɐbʲɪˈsmɨs⁽ʲ⁾lʲɪnːɨj]	"rendered meaningless"
необессмы́сленный	[nʲɪəbʲɪˈsmɨs⁽ʲ⁾lʲɪnːɨj]	"not rendered meaningless"

Russian has also proven friendly to long compounds. As an extreme case:

металлоло̀мообеспече́ние	[mʲɪtəlɐˌlomɐɐbʲɪsʲpʲɪˈtɕenʲɪje]	"provision of scrap metal"
металлоло̀мообеспе́ченный	[mʲɪtəlɐˌlomɐɐbʲɪˈsʲpʲetɕɪnːɨj]	"well supplied with scrap metal"

Purists (as Dmitry Ushakov in the preface to his dictionary) frown on such words. Some linguists have suggested that Russian compounding stems from Church Slavonic. In the twentieth century, abbreviated components frequently appeared in compounds:

управдо́м	[ʊprɐˈvdom] = управля́ющий до́мом	[ʊprɐˈvlʲӕjʉɕːɪj ˈdoməm]	"residence manager"

== Syntax ==
Basic word order, both in conversation and written language, is subject–verb–object. However, because grammatical relationships are marked by inflection, considerable latitude in word order is allowed, and all possible permutations can be used. For example, the words in the phrase "я пошёл в магазин" ('I went to the shop') can be arranged:

- Я пошёл в магазин. (I went to the shop; I went to the shop.)
- Я в магазин пошёл. (I to the shop went; approx. I am going out, my destination is the shop.)
- Пошёл я в магазин. (Went I to the shop; two meanings: can be treated as a beginning of a narrated story: "Went I to the shop, and something happened." or a decision made by someone after a long contemplation: "OK, I think I will go the shop.")
- Пошёл в магазин я. (Went to the shop I; rarely used, can be treated as a beginning of a line of a poem written in amphibrach due to uncommon word order, or when the speaker wants to highlight that exactly this subject "went to the shop". In that case, the subject is stressed)
- В магазин я пошёл. (To the shop I went; two meanings: can be used as a response: "I went to the shop." – "Sorry, where did you go?" – "To the shop—that's where I went." or an emphasis on the way of transportation: I went to the shop on foot.)
- В магазин пошёл я. (To the shop went I; It was me who went to the shop.)

while maintaining grammatical correctness. Note, however, that the order of the phrase "в магазин" ("to the shop") is kept constant.

Word order can express logical stress, and degree of definiteness. The primary emphasis tends to be initial, with a weaker emphasis at the end. Some of these arrangements can describe present actions, not only past (despite the fact that the verb пошёл is in the past).

In some cases, alternative word order can change the meaning entirely:

- Не надо меня уговаривать. ("No need me [to] persuade" → One should not persuade me [as I would never agree to do something].)
- Меня не надо уговаривать. ("Me no need [to] persuade" → There is no need to persuade me [as I will do it anyway].)

=== Impersonal sentences ===
Russian is a null-subject language – it allows constructing sentences without subject (Russian: безличные предложения). Some of them are claimed to not be impersonal, but to have oblique subject. One possible classification of such sentences distinguishes:

Subjectless impersonals contain an impersonal verb (in form of single third-person or single neutral), and no other word is used as a subject
Смеркалось. '(It got) dusky.'
В Москве полночь. '(It's) midnight in Moscow.'
Dative impersonals usually express personal feelings, where experiencer in dative case can possibly be considered as subject
Мне^{dat.} скучно. 'I'm bored.'
Other impersonals have an element which is neither nominative nor dative, but still is a nominal verb argument
Меня^{acc.} тошнит. 'I feel sick.'
Васю^{acc.} ударило током^{instr.}. 'Vasya had an electric shock.'

=== Negation ===
==== Multiple Negatives ====
Unlike in standard English, multiple negatives are compulsory in Russian, as in "никто никогда никому ничего не прощает" [nʲɪkˈto nʲɪkɐɡˈda nʲɪkɐˈmu nʲɪtɕɪˈvo nʲɪ prɐˈɕ:æjɪt] ('No-one ever forgives anyone for anything' literally, "no one never to no-one nothing does not forgive"). Usually, only one word in a sentence has negative particle or prefix "не" or belongs to negative word "нет", while another word has negation-affirmative particle or prefix "ни"; but this word can often be omitted, and thus ни becomes the signal of negation: вокруг никого нет and вокруг никого both mean "there is nobody around".

==== Adverbial answers ====
As a one-word answer to an affirmative sentence, yes translates да and no translates нет, as shown by the table below.

Answer to an affirmative sentence
	English	Russian
First speaker	It's raining	Идёт дождь
Agreeing with speaker (rain is falling)	Yes = it's raining	Да = идёт дождь
Disagreeing with speaker (rain is not falling)	No = it's not raining	Нет = дождь не идёт

No simple rule supplies an adverbial answer to a negative sentence. B. Comrie says that in Russian answer да or нет is determined not so much by the negative form of the question as by the questioner's intent for using negation, or whether the response is in agreement with his presupposition. In many cases that means that the adverbial answer should be extended for avoiding ambiguity; in spoken language, intonation in saying нет can also be significant to if it is affirmation of negation or negation of negation.

Answer to a negative question
Question	Interpretation	Positive answer what was negated is declared	Negative answer what was negated is refused
Не желаете ли печенья? Would you like to have some cookies?	Negation is used only for more politeness	Да, пожалуйста. Yes, please.	Нет, спасибо. No, thank you.
Не задумывались ли вы над этим? Haven't you considered this?	Presence of a negative particle is conditioned by the expectation of a positive answer	Да, задумывался. Yes, I have.	Нет, не задумывался. No, I haven't.
Так что, не ку́пите? So, you (definitely) won't buy (it)?	Negation is forced by the presumption of negative answer	Нет, берём. No, we will buy it.	Да, не берём (less common). / Нет, не берём. No, we won't buy it.
Ты ведь не сердишься на меня? (But) you are not angry with me, (are you)?	Negation is hoped for, rather than expected	Нет, я сержусь. / Да, сержусь. Yes, I am angry.	Нет, не сержусь. / Да, не сержусь (less common). No, I am not angry.

Note that while expressing an affirmation of negation by extending "да" with a negated verb is grammatically acceptable. In practice it is more common to answer "нет" and subsequently extend with a negated verb paralleling the usage in English. Answering a negative sentence with a non-extended "нет" is usually interpreted as an affirmation of negation again in a way similar to English.

Alternatively, both positive and negative simple questions can be answered by repeating the predicate with or without не, especially if да/нет is ambiguous: in the latest example, "сержусь" or "не сержусь".

=== Coordination ===
The most common types of coordination expressed by compound sentences in Russian are conjoining, oppositional, and separative. Additionally, the Russian grammar considers comparative, complemental, and clarifying. Other flavors of meaning may also be distinguished.

Conjoining coordinations are formed with the help of the conjunctions и "and", ни … ни ("not … not" — simultaneous negation), та́кже "also", то́же ("too"; the latter two have complementary flavors), etc. Most commonly the conjoining coordination expresses enumeration, simultaneity or immediate sequence. They may also have a cause-effect flavor.

Oppositional coordinations are formed with the help of the oppositional conjunctions: а "and"~"but", но "but", одна́ко "however", зато́ "on the other hand", же "and"~"but", etc. They express the semantic relations of opposition, comparison, incompatibility, restriction, or compensation.

Separative coordinations are formed with the help of the separative conjunctions: и́ли "or", ли́бо "either", ли … ли "whether … or", то … то "then … then", etc. They express alternation or incompatibility of things expressed in the coordinated sentences.

Complemental and clarifying coordination expresses additional, but not subordinated, information related to the first sentence.

Comparative coordination is a semantic flavor of the oppositional one.

Common coordinating conjunctions include:

- и [i] "and", enumerative, complemental;
- а [a] "and", comparative, tending to "but" or "while";
- но [no] "but", oppositional.

The distinction between "и" and "а" is important:

- "и" implies a following complemental state that does not oppose the antecedent;
- "а" implies a following state that acts in opposition to the antecedent, but more weakly than "но" ("but").

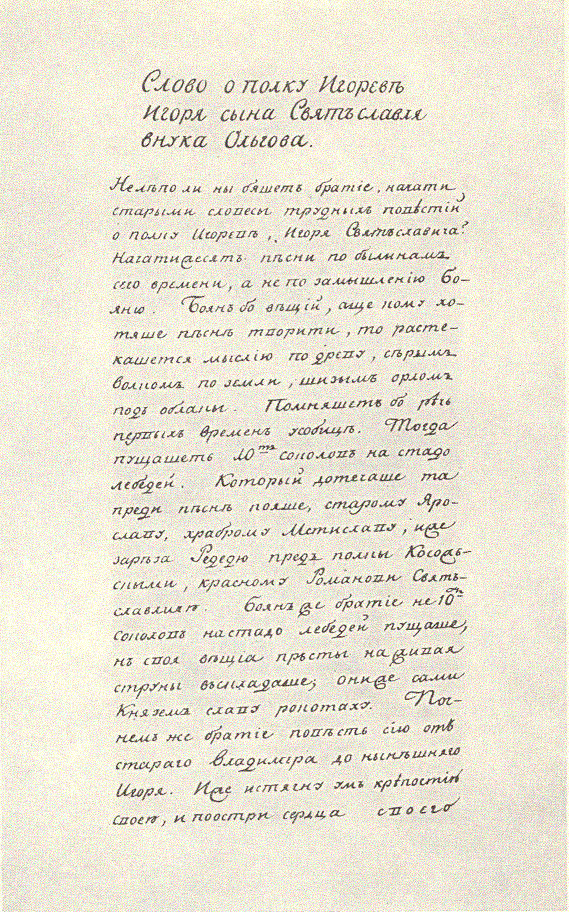
The Catherine manuscript of the Song of Igor, 1790s

они́ уе́хали, и мы уезжа́ем	[ɐˈnʲi ʊˈjexəlʲɪ] [ɪ ˈmɨ ʊ(ɪ̯)ɪˈʐːa(ɪ̯)ɪm]	they have left, and we are leaving (too)
они́ уже́ уе́хали, а мы ещё нет	[ɐˈnʲi ʊˈʐɛ ʊˈjexəlʲɪ] [ɐ ˈmɨ (j)ɪˈɕːɵ nʲet]	they have already left, while (but) we haven't (left) yet
они уе́хали, но ненадо́лго	[ɐˈnʲi ʊˈjexəlʲɪ] [nə nʲɪnəˈdoɫɡə]	they have left, but not for long

The distinction between "и" and "а" developed after medieval times. Originally, "и" and "а" were closer in meaning. The unpunctuated ending of the Song of Igor illustrates the potential confusion. The final five words in modern spelling, "князьям слава а дружине аминь" [knʲɪˈzʲjam ˈslavə ɐ druˈʐɨnʲɪ ɐˈmʲinʲ] can be understood either as "Glory to the princes and to their retinue! Amen." or "Glory to the princes, and amen (R.I.P.) to their retinue". Although the majority opinion is definitely with the first interpretation, no consensus has formed. The psychological difference between the two is quite obvious.

=== Subordination ===
Complementizers (subordinating conjunctions, adverbs, or adverbial phrases) include:

- если [ˈjesʲlʲɪ] 'if' (meaning 'in case where' not meaning 'whether');
- потому что [pətɐˈmu ʂtə] 'because'
- так как [tak kak] 'since' (meaning 'for the reason that')
- чтобы [ˈʂtobɨ], дабы [ˈdabɨ] (bookish, archaic) 'so that'
- после того, как [ˈposʲlʲɪ tɐˈvo kək] 'after'
- хотя [xɐˈtʲa] 'although'

In general, Russian has fewer subordinate clauses than English, because the participles and adverbial participles often take the place of a relative pronoun/verb combination. For example:

Вот человек, потерявший надежду.	[vot tɕɪlɐˈvʲek] [pətʲɪˈrʲafʂɨj nɐˈdʲeʐdʊ]	Here (is) a man who has lost (all) hope. [lit. having lost hope]
Гуляя по городу, всегда останавливаюсь у Ростральных колонн.	[ɡʊˈlʲӕjɪ pɐ ˈɡorədʊ fsʲɪɡˈda] [ɐstɐˈnavlʲɪvəjʉsʲ ʊ rɐˈstralʲnɨx kɐˈlon]	When I go for a walk in the city, I always pause by the Rostral Columns. [lit. Walking in the city, I...]

=== Absolute construction ===
Despite the inflectional nature of Russian, there is no equivalent in modern Russian to the English nominative absolute or the Latin ablative absolute construction. The old language had an absolute construction, with the noun in the dative. Like so many other archaisms, it is retained in Church Slavonic. Among the last known examples in literary Russian occurs in Radishchev's Journey from Petersburg to Moscow (Путешествие из Петербурга в Москву [pʊtʲɪˈʂɛstvʲɪje ɪs pʲɪtʲɪrˈburɡə v mɐˈskvu]), 1790:

Едущу мне из Едрова, Анюта из мысли моей не выходила. [ˈjedʊɕːʉ mnʲe ɪzʲ jɪˈdrovə, ɐˈnʲutə ɪz ˈmɨsʲlʲɪ mɐˈjej nʲɪ vɨxɐˈdʲilə] "As I was leaving Yedrovo village, I could not stop thinking about Aniuta."

== See also ==
- List of Russian language topics
- Reduplication in the Russian language
