= Reduplication in Russian =

Used to accentuate and intensify meaning

Linguistic reduplication is a distinct grammatical feature in Russian, where it can be used to derive reduplicated forms from existing stems to intensify their meanings in different ways.

Reduplication is also observable in borrowed words, such as "пинг-понг" ([pʲɪnkˈponk]; ping-pong) and "зигзаг" ([zʲɪɡˈzak]; zig-zag), but since the words were borrowed as is from other languages, they are not examples of reduplication as it works in the grammar of Russian.

== Syllabic/root/stem reduplication ==
There is virtually no productive syllabic or root/stem reduplication in the modern Russian language.

An ancient lexical stratum of the Russian language provides examples such as "мама" ([ˈmamə]; mommy), "папа" ([ˈpapə]; daddy), "баба" ([ˈbabə]; granny)—a phenomenon common to many languages. It is argued that these words originated in the reduplicated babbling of infants.

== Word reduplication ==
Word reduplications are mostly the feature of the colloquial language and in most cases do not constitute separate dictionary entries. Word reduplication may occur in the following forms:

- a hyphenated word, both of standard vocabulary or standard ad hoc word formation
  - exact reduplication:
    - "чуть-чуть" ([tɕʉtʲ ˈtɕʉtʲ]; "very few", lit. "few-few")—a vocabulary word
    - "белый-белый (снег)" ([ˈbʲɛlɨj ˈbʲɛlɨj (sʲnʲɛk)]; "very white (snow)", lit. "white-white (snow)")—ad hoc formation, for adjectives
  - inflected reduplication:
    - "давным-давно" ([dɐˈvnɨm dɐˈvno]; "very long time ago", lit. "pastly-past")
    - "белым-бело" ([bʲɪˈlɨm bʲɪˈlo]; "very white", lit. "whitely-white")
  - Reduplication of adjectives using the enhancement preposition "пре-" (/prʲe/)
    - "большой-пребольшой" (bɐˈlʲʂoj prʲɪbɐˈlʲʂoj]; "very big", lit. "big-very-big"
    - "белый-пребелый" ([ˈbʲɛlɨj prʲɪˈbʲɛlɨj]; "very white", lit. "white-very-white")
- A repetition of a word in dialogues as a device used either to request or to promise a higher degree of cooperation:
  - "Давай, давай!" or "Давай-давай", ([dɐˈvaj dɐˈvaj])—a general-purpose urge to do something, literally "give it, give it!", meaning "Come on!" or "Let's do it!"
  - "Беги, беги!" ([bʲɪˈɡʲi bʲɪˈɡʲi]; "Run, run!")—a specific urge to run: to run fast or to run right away.
  - "Конечно, конечно!" ([kɐˈnʲeʂnə kɐˈnʲeʂnə])—an enhanced agreement: "Of course, of course!"
  - "Да, да" ([da da] "Yes, yes")—an utterance used in dialogs to indicate either constant attention ("yes, yes, I am listening") or agreement ("yes, yes, of course")
- Shm-reduplication and m-reduplication, to express irony, borrowed from Yiddish and Central Asian cultures respectively, sometimes used as a mockery of the corresponding languages or peoples; see Russian jokes about Georgians for examples of this phenomenon
- As an expression of a frequentative or of a prolonged action
  - "Тянут-потянут, вытянуть не могут" ([ˈtʲanut pɐˈtʲanut ˈvɨtʲɪnutʲ nʲɪ ˈmoɡut]; "They are pulling and pulling, but cannot pull it [the turnip] out")—a phrase from the classical fairy tale Repka ("Репка", "The Turnip")
  - "Смотрит, смотрит" ([ˈsmotrʲɪt ˈsmotrʲɪt]; "[he] is looking and looking")
  - "Шёл, шёл" ([ʂol ʂol]; "[he] went and went")
- Onomatopoeic reduplication
  - "Кап-кап-кап" ([kap kap kap]; the sound of the droplets of water)
  - "Тик-так" ([tik tak]) or "тик-тик-тик" ([tik tik tik]); the sound of a clock ticking
  - "Гав-гав" ([ɡav ɡaf]); bowwow, barking of a dog
- Frequentative, often combined with ideophonic/onomatopoeic derivation
  - "Чик-чик" ([tɕik tɕik]), from "чикнуть", "to slash with a knife"
  - "Прыг-прыг" ([prɨk prɨk]), from "прыгать" ("to jump", "to hop"). A similar derivation in English would be "When the red red robin/Comes bob bob bobbing along").

== Affixal reduplication ==
A peculiarity of Russian language is synonymic affixal reduplication, whereby a root may acquire two productive suffixes or prefixes, different, but of the same semantics, with the corresponding intensification of the meaning:

- Affectional diminutives:
  - "Подруга" ([pɐˈdruɡə])→"подружка" ([pɐˈdruʂkə])→"подруженька" ([pɐˈdruʐɨnʲkə] "girlfriend"). Here, "г"→"ж" is an example of consonant mutation, and "-к-" and "-ень-" are two diminutive-generating suffixes. This kind of word formation is especially productive for given names: "Екатерина" ([jɪkətʲɪˈrʲinə], "Catherine")→"Катя" ([ˈkatʲə], hypocoristic)→"Катюша" ([kɐˈtʲuʂə] "Katyusha")→"Катюшенька" ([kɐˈtʲuʂɨnʲkə])→"Катюшенечка" ([kɐˈtʲuʂɨnʲɪtɕkə], sounds intentionally ridiculous)
- Another example:
  - "Забыть" ([zɐˈbɨtʲ], "to forget")→"призабыть" ([prʲɪzɐˈbɨtʲ], "to forget for a while")→"попризабыть" ([pəprʲɪzɐˈbɨtʲ])

== See also ==
- Amredita
