= Khalyava =

Russian term similar to "freebie"

In Russian culture, khalyava / by khalyava (Russian: халява, на халяву) is an untranslatable concept, similar to the concepts of "freebie" and "getting something for nothing", however with a different semantic field.

Khalyava is a possibility to get something without particular effort. A distinction is that khalyava is something free one is not normally entitled to. It may be a result of luck. For comparison, if your friend gives you a ticket inviting you to go to the movies, it is not khalyava, if it is part of your normal relations, but if he gives you a ticket because his wife cannot go, then it is khalyava. Another possibility is that one gets something free in a way of dubious morality or legality, but not outright criminal.

The "something" you get is not necessarily something tangible; it may be a possibility to get something, e.g., to buy a rare book by a lucky occasion, i.e., "by khalyava".

A slightly different meaning for "khalyava" is an easy, low-effort job.

Both meanings are given in the Sergey Ozhegov's lexicographic dictionary, but absent in Vladimir Dahl's.

A person who is good at getting a khalyava is called khalyavnik or khalyavshchik, which may simply mean "a lucky man". However khalyava may come at the expense of others. In the first case it may be eating at restaurants at other's expense; in the second meaning this involves a skill to dump the hard part of the job on others. In this case "khalyavshchik" becomes pejorative and reasonably corresponds to "freeloader" or "free rider".

== See also ==
- Schnorrer
