= List of Russian federal subject name etymologies =

The Russian Federation constitutionally consists of 85 federal subjects, 46 of which are oblasts ("provinces"), 9 are krais ("territories"), 22 are republics (one of them, Crimea, is claimed by Ukraine and not recognised internationally as a part of Russia), four are autonomous okrugs ("districts"), and three are the cities of federal significance (Sevastopol has the same international status as Crimea). The Jewish Autonomous Oblast remains the only example of this type, while other AOs had elevated to republican level in the early 1990s.

Most of Russia's oblasts and krais take their names from their administrative center; while autonomous entities (republics, autonomous okrugs and autonomous oblast) received their names from the native peoples they was created for by the Soviet government in 1920s–30s.

== Oblasts ==
All of the oblast names in Russian are based on the following model: "name of the central city" (with a few exceptions) + "-skaya" feminine adjective suffix.

English name	Russian name	Meaning and notes
(Amur Oblast) Amur	Амурская область, Amurskaya oblast′	From the Amur River, which forms the southern border of the region
(Arkhangelsk Oblast) Arkhangelsk	Архангельская область Arkhangel′skaya oblast′	The region of the city of Arkhangelsk, whose name the inhabitants traditionally associated with a monastery in the area dedicated to the Archangel Michael.
(Astrakhan Oblast) Astrakhan	Астраханская область, Astrakhanskaya oblast′	The region of the city of Astrakhan, whose name is a corruption of old Turkic Haji Tarkhan. Tarkhan is possibly a Turco-Mongolian title standing for "great khan," or "king", while haji or hajji is a title given to one who has made the Islamic requisite of pilgrimage to Mecca.
(Belgorod Oblast) Belgorod	Белгородская область, Belgorodskaya oblast′	The region of the city of Belgorod, literally "white city". Compare: Belgrade
(Bryansk Oblast) Bryansk	Брянская область, Bryanskaya oblast′	The region of the city of Bryansk, known in medieval times as Debryansk, from Old East Slavic: дъбръ, romanized: dŭbrŭ, lit. 'dense woodland'
(Chelyabinsk Oblast) Chelyabinsk	Челябинская область, Chelyabinskaya oblast′	The region of the city of Chelyabinsk. The city (initially a Russian fortress Chelyaba) received its name after a Bashkir locality, whose etymology is disputed.: From Turkic title Çelebi; From Bashkir siläbe "hollow, depression"
(Irkutsk Oblast) Irkutsk	Иркутская область, Irkutskaya oblast′	The city of Irkutsk was named after the Irkut River with -sk suffix used for names of the cities. Its name was derived from the Buryat word for "spinning," and was used as an ethnonym among local tribes, who were known as Yrkhu, Irkit, Irgit, and Irgyt.
(Ivanovo Oblast) Ivanovo	Ивановская область, Ivanovskaya oblast′	The city of Ivanovo was previously known as Ivanovo-Voznesensk and was formed as a result of the merger of two settlements: Ivanovo — from given name Ivan with typical -ovo suffix.; Voznesensk — from Voznesensky posad, a workers′ settlement named after the near Ascension Church (Russian: Вознесение, romanized: Vozneseniye). This part was discarded in 1932 during anti-religious campaign. According to another version, residents criticized the name for being too long.
(Kaliningrad Oblast) Kaliningrad	Калининградская область, Kaliningradskaya oblast′	From its center Kaliningrad (Kalinin-city), renamed in 1946 in memory of the recently deceased Soviet leader Mikhail Kalinin. The region itself forms the northern part of former East Prussia.
(Kaluga Oblast) Kaluga	Калужская область, Kaluzhskaya oblast′	From Old Russian kaluga - "bog, quagmire".
(Kemerovo Oblast) Kemerovo	Кемеровская область, Kemerovskaya oblast′	The city of Kemerovo, region's capital, was named after the surname of the first settlers — Kemerov. The ending "ovo" suggests a toponymic transition through a personal name.; Another name of the Kemerovo oblast, Kuzbass, made official in 2020, is a short form of Kuznetsk Basin. This coal-mining region is called after Kuznetsk Alatau mountain range, which was named after Shors, a native people known archaically as Blacksmithing Tatars (Kuznetskiye Tatary), to distinguish these mountains from other Alataus.
(Kirov Oblast) Kirov	Кировская область, Kirovskaya oblast′	The city of Vyatka was renamed to Kirov soon after the assassination of Sergei Kirov, a high Soviet official who was born in the region.
(Kostroma Oblast) Kostroma	Костромская область, Kostromskaya oblast′	The city of Kostroma received its name from the river it stands on. Its etymology is uncertain: Dialectal Kostra — shives; Kostroma, Old East Slavic goddess.
(Kurgan Oblast) Kurgan	Курганская область, Kurganskaya oblast′	From the city of Kurgan. Its name is taken from a burial mound close to the original settlement. The word itself has Turkic origin.
(Kursk Oblast) Kursk	Курская область, Kurskaya oblast′	The city of Kursk was named after Kur River. The name relates to a dialect word kur'ya ("long and narrow river bay"), while city's coat of arms with three partridges shows a folk etymology version of the origin of the name (Russian: куропатка, romanized: kuropatka "perdix")
(Leningrad Oblast) Leningrad	Ленинградская область, Leningradskaya oblast′	The city of Leningrad (Lenin-city) was renamed back to St. Petersburg following the 1991 referendum, but Leningrad Oblast retained its name.
(Lipetsk Oblast) Lipetsk	Липецкая область, Lipetskaya oblast′	From Lipetsk, literally "Linden city"
(Magadan Oblast) Magadan	Магаданская область, Magadanskaya oblast′	From its capital, Magadan, which etymology is uncertain: Even word "mongodan" — marine sediment; "mongot" — a dried tree, then "mongodan" is a plural of it; Even nickname Magda — "rotten hemp"
(Moscow Oblast) Moscow	Московская область, Moskovskaya oblast′	Moscow Oblast is the region surrounding Russia's capital Moscow. See Moscow below.; Its unofficial name Podmoskovye (Russian: Подмосковье) literally means "under Moscow"
(Murmansk Oblast) Murmansk	Мурманская область, Murmanskaya oblast′	Murmansk, region's capital, is named for the Murman Coast (Murmanskiy bereg), which is in turn derived from an archaic term in Russian for "Norwegian".
(Nizhny Novgorod Oblast) Nizhny Novgorod	Нижегородская область, Nizhegorodskaya oblast′	Nizhny Novgorod literally means "Lower New Town". The prefix "lower" is used to distinguish it from Veliky Novgorod ("Great New Town") and Novhorod-Siverskyi ("New Town in Severia"). Russian name for this oblast is Nizhegorodskaya (literally "of Lower Town"), and not Nizhne(-)novgorodskaya as one might expect.
(Novgorod Oblast) Novgorod	Новгородская область, Novgorodskaya oblast′	Literally "Region of New Town", after its capital Veliky Novgorod, which means "Great New Town" as stated above. Before 1999 was known as just Novgorod.
(Novosibirsk Oblast) Novosibirsk	Новосибирская область, Novosibirskaya oblast′	Literally "Region of New Siberian Town"
(Omsk Oblast) Omsk	Омская область, Omskaya oblast′	The name of Omsk city is derived from the Om River which in turn is probably originates from the Baraba Tatar om "quiet".
(Orenburg Oblast) Orenburg	Оренбургская область, Orenburgskaya oblast′	The city of Orenburg (Or River + German: Burg "castle") was founded near the meeting of the Or and Ural rivers, but was later moved down the Ural. The initial place of the fortress became known as Orsk.
(Oryol Oblast) Oryol	Орловская область, Orlovskaya oblast′	From Oryol, literally "eagle"
(Penza Oblast) Penza	Пензенская область, Penzenskaya oblast′	City of Penza is named after Penza River, whose name possibly comes from: Mordvin for edge, end, border or muddy, swampy; Proto-Mari for stream; an ancient Mordovian male given name Piyanza.
(Pskov Oblast) Pskov	Псковская область, Pskovskaya oblast′	The name of the main city, originally Pleskov (historic Russian spelling Плѣсковъ, Plěskov), may be loosely translated as "[the town] of purling waters".
(Rostov Oblast) Rostov	Ростовская область, Rostovskaya oblast′	The city of Rostov on Don originates from a fortress named for Dimitry of Rostov, a metropolitan bishop of the old northern town of Rostov the Great. The word "Rostov" is usually associated with a personal name Rost (lit. "growth"). Compare: Rostislav
(Ryazan Oblast) Ryazan	Рязанская область, Ryazanskaya oblast′	The region was named after its capital, which was initially known as Pereyaslavl-Ryazansky and officially took the name of ancient city of Ryazan in 1778. The original Ryazan, the capital of medieval principality, was devastated by Mongols in 1237.: The name of the city is an Old Russian possessive adjective Рѣзань (Rězan′), related with archaic male given name Rezan, which is a short form of rezanny "[child] cut from [the womb]"; The city possibly retained its name after the surrounding region, which in the Middle Ages was allegedly "cut off" from another Rus' lands by dense forests and swamps.; Vladimir Minorsky connected Ryazan with Arthania.
(Sakhalin Oblast) Sakhalin	Сахалинская область, Sakhalinskaya oblast′	This region received its name from its largest island, which name is supposed to originate from Manchu Saghalien ula anga hata "island in the mouth of Black River." Thus Sakhalin is "Black"
(Samara Oblast) Samara	Самарская область, Samarskaya oblast′	Regional center Samara is named after Samara River, which etymology is uncertain: from Indo-Iranian for "summer river/water"; from Tatar and Chuvash samar, Kalmyk samr "bag, bowl"
(Saratov Oblast) Saratov	Саратовская область, Saratovskaya oblast′	From Turkic Sary Tau "Yellow Mountain", russianized as Saratov (meaningless Sarat + -ov suffix) or Sar Atau "Boggy Island".
(Smolensk Oblast) Smolensk	Смоленская область, Smolenskaya oblast′	From the city of Smolensk on Smolnya River (smola "resin" or smol′ "black soil")
(Sverdlovsk Oblast) Sverdlovsk	Свердловская область, Sverdlovskaya oblast′	Regional center Ekaterinburg was known as Sverdlovsk in 1924–91 after the early Soviet leader Yakov Sverdlov.
(Tambov Oblast) Tambov	Тамбовская область, Tambovskaya oblast′	The name "Tambov" originates from Moksha "томба" (tomba) meaning "abyss", or "deep pool".
(Tomsk Oblast) Tomsk	Томская область, Tomskaya oblast′	The city of Tomsk is located on the bank of the Tom River, which name derives from Ket words tom "river" or tuma "dark, black"
(Tula Oblast) Tula	Тульская область, Tul′skaya oblast′	Etymology of Tula
(Tver Oblast) Tver	Тверская область, Tverskaya oblast′	The name of the city of Tver is of Finno-Ugric origin, Tiheverä while folk etymology traces it back to Old Russian tverd′ "fortress" (compare Polish twierdza)
(Tyumen Oblast) Tyumen	Тюменская область, Tyumenskaya oblast′	In 1586, a fortress was constructed on the site of the former Siberian Tatar town of Chingi-Tura ("city of Chingis"), also known as Tyumen, from the Turkish and Mongol word for "ten thousand" – tumen.
(Ulyanovsk Oblast) Ulyanovsk	Ульяновская область, Ulyanovskaya oblast′	The city of Simbirsk was renamed Ulyanovsk in 1924 since it was the birthplace of Vladimir Lenin, leader of October Revolution and founder of the Soviet Union, whose actual last name was Ulyanov.
(Vladimir Oblast) Vladimir	Владимирская область, Vladimirskaya oblast′	The city of Vladimir was founded by the Grand Prince Vladimir II Monomakh. See Vladimir#Etymology
(Volgograd Oblast) Volgograd	Волгоградская область, Volgogradskaya oblast′	Volga River + -grad "town/city" = Volgograd
(Vologda Oblast) Vologda	Вологодская область, Vologodskaya oblast′	From Old Veps valgeda (modern vauged) "white"
(Voronezh Oblast) Voronezh	Воронежская область, Voronezhskaya oblast′	from the hypothetical Slavic personal name Voroneg; from voron- (Proto-Slavic vorn) in the meaning of "black, dark" and the suffix -ezh (-azh, -ozh). In the 8th - 9th centuries it allegedly marked a vast territory covered with black forests (oak forests) and the main "city" of the early town-planning complex could repeat the name of the region.
(Yaroslavl Oblast) Yaroslavl	Ярославская область, Yaroslavskaya oblast′	The city of Yaroslavl was founded by the Grand Prince Yaroslav the Wise and named after him with addition of -l′ suffix.

== Krais ==
English name	Russian name	Meaning and notes
(Altai Krai) Altai	Алтайский край, Altaiskiy kray	After Altai Mountains. The name comes from two words: al "gold/reddish/yellowish" in Mongolic language, and -tai "mountain" in Turkic languages too; thus, literally, the "Golden Mountain".
(Kamchatka Krai) Kamchatka	Камчатский край, Kamchatskiy kray	From Kamchatka Peninsula, which etymology is disputed: From Kamchatka River, which got its name from the 17th-century explorer Ivan Kamchaty. His surname has derived from archaic name for silk — kamchataya tkan′. He was allegedly involved in collecting yasak from indigenous peoples and was later found dead along with his colleagues. Kamchaty's campaign gave birth to the legend among the Itelmens about the glorious warrior Konshat.; From dialectal kamchat "big beaver" (probably derived from Tatar kama ).; From Yakut khamsa/kamcha "smoking pipe" or kham-sat "to waver".
(Khabarovsk Krai) Khabarovsk	Хабаровский край, Khabarovskiy kray	From the city of Khabarovsk, named after 17th-century explorer Yerofey Khabarov.
(Krasnodar Krai) Krasnodar	Краснодарский край, Krasnodarskiy kray	From the city of Krasnodar. See Krasnodar#Name
(Krasnoyarsk Krai) Krasnoyarsk	Красноярский край, Krasnoyarskiy kray	From the city of Krasnoyarsk. It was founded as a fort and named Krasny Yar ('red steep-riverbank') a literal translation of Yarin (a dialect of Khakas) name of the place, Kyzyl Char.
(Perm Krai) Perm	Пермский край Permskiy kray	From the city of Perm. See Perm, Russia#Etymology
(Primorsky Krai) Primorsky	Приморский край, Primorskiy kray	Literally "Littoral Region" denoting its location on the coast of the Sea of Japan.
(Stavropol Krai) Stavropol	Ставропольский край, Stavropol′skiy kray	From the city of Stavropol which name is a Russian rendering of the Greek Stauropolis (Ancient Greek: Σταυρούπολις "City of the Cross").
(Zabaykalsky Krai) Zabaykalsky	Забайкальский край, Zabaikal′skiy kray	Literally "Transbaikal Region", despite modern Zabaykalsky Krai has no access to the lake in contrast with imperial Transbaikal Oblast. In 1934–2008 the region was known as Chita Oblast after its capital, Chita.

== Republics ==
English name	Russian name	Native name	Titular nationality	Meaning and notes
Adygea	Республика Адыгея, Respublika Adygeya	Adyghe: Адыгэ Республик, Adygæ Respublik	Adyghe	
(Altai Republic) Altai	Республика Алтай, Respublika Altai	Altai: Алтай Республика, Altay Respublika; Kazakh: Алтай Республикасы, Altaı Respýblıkasy	Altai	From Altai Mountains. See Altai Krai above.; The name Gorny Altai (Russian: Горный Алтай), literally "Mountainous Altai" is also used to distinguish it from Altai Krai, which is mostly plain.
Bashkortostan	Республика Башкортостан, Respublika Bashkortostan	Bashkir: Башҡортостан Республикаһы, Bashqortostan Respublikahy	Bashkirs	From the endonym of Bashkirs bashqort with adding of -stan suffix. Unofficial name Bashkiria (Russian: Башкирия) is also frequently used.
Buryatia	Республика Бурятия, Respublika Buryatiya	Buryat: Буряад Улас, romanized: Buryaad Ulas	Buryats	
Chechnya	Чеченская Республика, Chechenskaya Respublika	Chechen: Нохчийн Республика, romanized: Nokhchiyn Respublika	Chechens	
Chuvashia	Чувашская Республика, Chuvashskaya Respublika	Chuvash: Чӑваш Республики, Chovash Respubliki	Chuvash	
(Autonomous Republic of Crimea) Crimea	Республика Крым, Respublika Krym	Ukrainian: Республіка Крим, Respublika Krym; Crimean Tatar: Къырым Джумхуриети, Qırım Cumhuriyeti	none	See Crimea#Name
Dagestan	Республика Дагестан, Respublika Dagestan	see here	none	Turkic dağ "mountain" + Persian -stan "land".
Ingushetia	Республика Ингушетия, Respublika Ingushetiya	Ingush: ГӀалгӏай Мохк, Ghalghai mokhk	Ingush	See Ingushetia#Etymology
Kabardino-Balkaria	Кабардино-Балкарская Республика, Kabardino-Balkarskaya Respublika	Kabardian: Къэбэрдей-Балъкъэр Республикэ, Qeberdei-Baĺqêr Respublike; Karachay-Balkar: Къабарты-Малкъар Республика, Qabarty-Malqar Respublika	Kabardians and Balkars	
Kalmykia	Республика Калмыкия, Respublika Kalmykiya	Kalmyk: Хальмг Таңһч, Hal′mg Taŋghch	Kalmyks	
Karachay-Cherkessia	Карачаево-Черкесская Республика, Karachayevo-Cherkesskaya Respublika	Karachay-Balkar: Къарачай-Черкес Республика, Qarachay-Cherkes Respublika; Kabardian: Къэрэшей-Шэрджэс Республикэ, Qereshei-Sherjes Respublike; Nogai: Карашай-Шеркеш Республика, Karashay-Sherkesh Respublika	Karachays and Cherkess	
(Republic of Karelia) Karelia	Республика Карелия, Respublika Kareliya	Karelian: Karjalan tazavaldu; Finnish: Karjalan tasavalta; Veps: Karjalan Tazovaldkund	Karelians	
Khakassia	Республика Хакасия, Respublika Khakasiya	Khakas: Хакас Республиказы, Khakas Respublikazy	Khakas	
(Komi Republic) Komi	Республика Коми, Respublika Komi	Komi: Коми Республика, romanized: Komi Respublika	Komi-Zyrians	
Mari El	Республика Марий Эл, Respublika Mariy El	Meadow Mari: Марий Эл Республик, Mariy El Respublik; Hill Mari: Мары Эл Республик, Mary El Respublik	Mari	El is "country, region" in Mari.
Mordovia	Республика Мордовия, Respublika Mordoviya	Moksha/Erzya: Мордовия Республикась, Mordoviya Respublikas′	Mokshas and Erzyas	The two native peoples of the region are usually summarized as Mordvins
North Ossetia–Alania	Республика Северная Осетия — Алания, Respublika Severnaya Osetiya — Alaniya	Iron Ossetic: Республикӕ Цӕгат Ирыстон — Алани, Rêspublika Tsagât Iryshton — Âlâni	Ossetians	Forms the northern part of Ossetia, divided by Caucasus Mountains. Alternative name Alania was made official in 1994. The breakaway republic of South Ossetia did the same in 2017 to indicate its ethnic unity with the North.
(Sakha Republic) Sakha	Республика Саха (Якутия), Respublika Sakha (Yakutiya)	Yakut: Саха Өрөспүүбүлүкэтэ, romanized: Sakha Öröspüübülükete	Yakuts	Yakut endonym Sakha was made official name of the region in 1990s. In Russian Yakutia is still used more widely.
Tatarstan	Республика Татарстан, Respublika Tatarstan	Tatar: Татарстан Республикасы, Tatarstan Respublikasy	Tatars	Tatars + -stan. Alternative name Tataria (Russian: Татария) became much less common since the fall of the Soviet Union.
Tuva	Республика Тыва, Respublika Tyva	Tuvan: Тыва Республика, romanized: Tyva Respublika	Tuvans	Tuvan name Tyva was made official in Russian in 90s, but Tuva is still widely used.
Udmurtia	Удмуртская Республика, Udmurtskaya Respublika	Udmurt: Удмурт Республика, Udmurt Respublika	Udmurts	See Udmurtia#Name

== Autonomous okrugs and oblasts ==
English name	Russian name	Native name	Titular nationality	Meaning and notes
(Chukotka Autonomous Okrug) Chukotka	Чукотский автономный округ, Chukotski avtonomnyi okrug	Chukot: Чукоткакэн автономныкэн округ, Chukotkaken avtonomnyken okrug	Chukchi	Chukchi, Russian exonym for the native people of the land, has derived from Chukot word chauchu "rich in reindeer".
(Khanty-Mansi Autonomous Okrug) Khanty-Mansi	Ханты-Мансийский автономный округ Khanty-Mansiyski avtonomnyi okrug	Khanty: Хӑнты-Мансийской автономной округ Ȟănty-Mansiyskoi avtonomnoi okrug Mansi: Ханты-Мансийский автономный округ Hanty-Mansiyski avtonomnyi okrug	Khanty and Mansi	Alternative name Yugra (official since 2003) is an archaic collective name for lands and peoples between the Pechora River and the Urals
(Nenets Autonomous Okrug) Nenets	Ненецкий автономный округ Nenetski avtonomnyi okrug	Nenets: Ненёцие автономной ӈокрук Nenyotsiye awtonomnoi ŋokruk	Nenets	
(Yamalo-Nenets Autonomous Okrug) Yamalo-Nenets	Ямало-Ненецкий автономный округ Yamalo-Nenetski avtonomnyi okrug	Nenets: Ямалы-Ненёцие автономной ӈокрук Yamaly-Nenyotsiye awtonomnoi ŋokruk	Nenets	Nenets people + Yamal Peninsula
(Jewish Autonomous Oblast) Jewish	Еврейская автономная область Yevreiskaya avtonomnaya oblast′	Yiddish: ייִדישע אװטאָנאָמע געגנט yidishe avtonome Gegnt	Jews	The Russian name for Jews yevrei is a cognate of the modern English word Hebrew (See Hebrew#Etymology).

== Federal cities ==
English name	Russian name	Meaning and notes
Moscow	Москва; Moskva	From the Moskva River. See Etymology of Moscow
(Saint Petersburg) St. Petersburg	Санкт-Петербург; Sankt-Peterburg	Named by Emperor Peter the Great after his patron saint (German: Sankt "saint" and Burg "fortress"). Soviet-era name Leningrad is still retained in the name of the surrounding oblast.
Sevastopol	Севастополь; Sevastopol′	Greek sebastos "venerable" and polis "city"
