= Letter Zyu =

Russian phraseme

Letter Zyu (Russian: Буква зю) is a Russian phraseme, meaning the contortion of the human body into a strange, improbable, hunched shape. This is a relatively new idiomatic expression, dating from the 1970s or 1980s, which has come to acquire a variety of other meanings in the process of becoming more widespread.

== History ==
=== Origin ===
Sign of Zorro

A hypothesis for the origin of the phrase was offered in an article in the journal "Russian speech" by A. V. Zelenin, who believed that it originated from films about Zorro, the hallmark of which were the letter Z, and had spread in the 1970s and 80s among college students. According to Zelenin, the letter zyu was created by replacing the last two letters of the British English name for the Latin letter Z with the letter "Yu (Cyrillic)". Zelenin believed that this change occurred under the influence of the Greek letters Mu and Nu, the phonetic form of which, in his view, bemused students. However others disagree with the association with Zorro, claiming that the letter 'Z' itself reminds a person kneeling in a bent position.

=== Later usage ===
Zelenin wrote that, initially, in 1980s, the phrase "the letter zyu" denoted the strangely bent position of the human body that was widespread among car owners in the Soviet Union who spent a lot of time repairing their cars. Later, toward the end of the 1980s, the phraseme entered into the lexicon of dacha owners and came to mean long-term work in a kneeling position on the ground. This usage, without reference to the dacha or automobiles, became widespread not only in the spoken language, but also in the press and in literary language.

In the process of evolving into an idiomatic expression, the phrase became distanced from its original meaning, "resembling the letter Z," and came to mean curvature of any kind. The expression is now used to refer to any object that is found in a curved, strange state.

In the mid-1990s, the expression penetrated into journalism, undergoing bizarre semantic transformations. According to Zelenin, "the letter zyu" contained significant potential and in the near future would be widespread in phraseological textbooks and dictionaries.

However, the expression "the letter zyu" can be found only in the lexicon of speakers living in large metropolitan areas in Russia and, to a lesser extent, in some countries of the former Soviet Union. Thus, the Ukrainian idiom (zignuty) yak letter zyu ("(bent) like the letter zyu") attracted the attention of the Kharkov philologist N. F. Umantseva. In Russian-speaking communities of foreign countries outside the former Soviet Union, the expression is not popular. According to A. V. Zelenin, this is due to the fact that Russian people surrounded by the Latin alphabet are less likely to discover the possibility of a different, ironic take on the letter Z.

== Other meanings ==
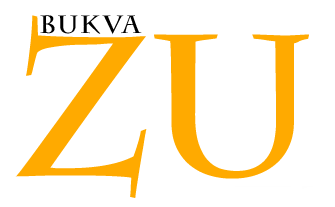
rightCcomputer program Zu letter (Letter Zu), intended for the transliteration of English letters and their combinations in Russian letters

The large variety of meanings taken on by the expression was due to a shift in semantic emphasis from the second word, "zyu," to the first word, "letter." Zelenin characterized this as the "actualization of the first, nominative, element of the combination." By a transfer of meaning, "the letter zyu" began to denote illegible handwriting, a mysterious character, or just scribbles.

In the Great dictionary of Russian proverbs of Mokienko and Nikitina, there is an alternative meaning of the expression: there, the letter zyu is described as school jargon, a playful nickname for a math teacher. A related, new slang phrase is also found there: the "clumsy zyu," which denotes a strangely dressed man.

There is a popular computer program Bukva zyu ("Letter Zu"), intended for the transliteration of English letters and their combinations in Russian letters.

=== Zyuganov and letter zyu ===
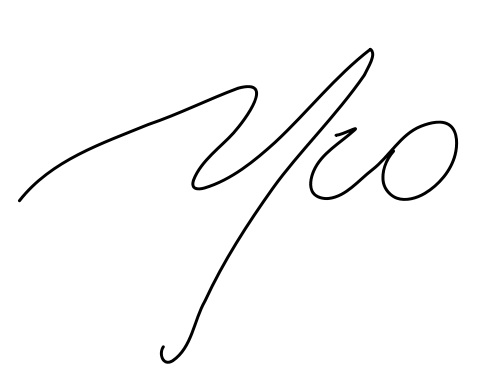
the 34th letter of the Russian alphabet – letter Zyu

The first syllable of the surname of Gennady Zyuganov is actively used as a source for his nicknames. In 1999, Dmitry Bykov published an article on the political career of G.A. Zyuganov, entitled "The Letter Zyu". In this article, he writes about Zyuganov as a loser politician, in particular noting that his name associates with the "zyu", a radiculitis pose". On Zyuganov's 65th birthday, trade unionists presented him with, among other things, a depiction of "the 34th letter of the Russian alphabet – the letter Zyu" (see illustration). Zyuganov said on this occasion: "The alphabet shall be kept intact, and this letter will be used only on holidays."

== Literature ==
- A. V. Zelenin, a candidate of Philology (January 2005). "Letter Zyu". Russian Speech (1). Russian Academy of Sciences: 79–83.
