= Vanessa Hafenbrädl =

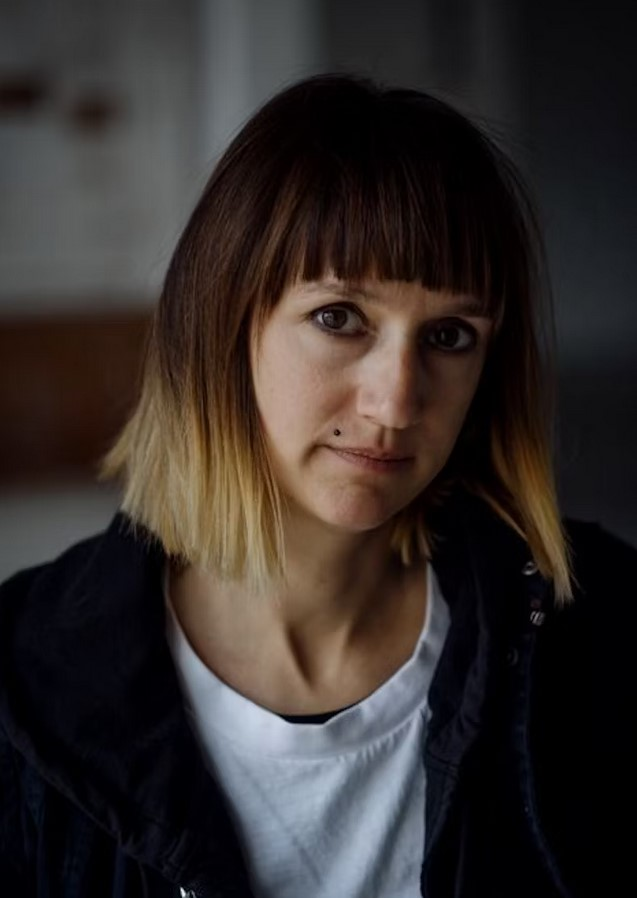
- Vanessa in 2021
- Born: Vanessa Hafenbrädl; 5 December 1979 (age 46); Gräfelfing, Germany
- Known for: Light art, Video art, Glass art, Visual art
- Website: https://www.vanessahafenbraedl.de/

Vanessa Hafenbrädl (born 5 December 1979) is a German light artist who creates immersive installations using video mapping, glass art, music, and poetry. Her works often question social norms, human archetypes, and role models. Hafenbrädl has been a member of the German Artists' Association since 2012. Hafenbrädl was awarded the Tassilo Award in 2023 for her poetic visual narratives.

== Life and work ==
Hafenbrädl was born on 5 December 1979 and grew up in Gräfelfing, a municipality to the west of Munich. Her career began in theater, where she established herself as an object, pyrotechnics, and video technician. Her work took her to renowned stages, from the Thalia Theater in Hamburg to the Residenztheater and the Münchner Kammerspiele to alternative venues such as the Muffathalle, Kunstpark Ost, Rote Fabrik in Zurich, as well as Hafenklang and Fusion Festival Lärz. She has also performed internationally with the Aktionstheater Panoptikum. In order to combine her technical expertise with artistic vision, she studied "Digital Film and Animation" at the SAE Institute in Hamburg from 2011 to 2013.

She sees her artistic work as a dialogue between history and modern technology. Her video mapping projects have been featured at international festivals, from the Luminale in Frankfurt to the Lichtkunst Biennale Evi Lichtungen in Hildesheim, the List í Ljósi in Iceland, the Illuminus Festival in the USA, and the Lux Light Festival in New Zealand.

A turning point in her career came in 2016 when she won the International Festival for Audiovisual Projections Genius Loci Weimar with her projection Erlinde. This success inspired her to not only illuminate the history of places, but to explore it.

During a visit to the Glasmuseum Frauenau in 2019, she gained new insights into her family origins as a descendant of a glassblowing dynasty whose mirrors were renowned for their size. This biographical connection to a traditional craft had a significant influence on her artistic work. As a result, Hafenbrädl developed her own glass body for her projections, which reinterprets historical portraits and establishes connections between the past and the present.

In the video installation Angel in the House, accompanied by a sound collage by Anna McCarthy, she questions the gender roles of the 19th century. The work plays with the fairy tale of Snow White and the "Drama of Ludwigsthal" from her own family history, in which women suffered similar fates due to imposed moral concepts. The mirrors used in the installation are made of traditionally mouth-blown genuine antique glass from the Glasfabrik Lamberts, which adds an additional historical layer to the project. In 2022, Hafenbrädl performed at the former family castle in Ludwigsthal and the neighboring Sacred Heart Church, accompanied by Marc Chouarain on the glass organ. Another project, Wild things, is dedicated to the story of Jella Lepman, the founder of the International Youth Library in Blutenburg Castle.

Her poetic visual narratives earned her the Tassilo Culture Prize from the Süddeutsche Zeitung newspaper in 2023. She furthered her international work in 2024 with an artist residency in Tbilisi in collaboration with the Goethe-Institut.

The video installation "Dyad" is a temporary work of art that plays on the facade of the historic dovecote in Dießen am Ammersee. The work was commissioned by the Heimatverein Dießen e.V. on the occasion of its 100th anniversary and took place from July 19 to 22, 2025. The title "Dyad" refers to a duality or a pair that has a relationship with each other. The installation highlights the ambivalent relationship between humans and pigeons, which have historically been regarded both as useful helpers and as devalued animals.

For the Lichtfest Leipzig 2025, which commemorates the Peaceful Revolution of 1989 on October 9, Vanessa Hafenbrädl presented her large-format video projection No Flag at the Städtisches Kaufhaus on Neumarkt in the city department store. The Festival of Lights commemorates the Leipzig Monday demonstrations in East Germany of October 9, 1989, which are considered to have been the decisive impetus for the fall of the Berlin Wall on November 9, 1989.

Above the heads of thousands of visitors a large fabric banner was blown in the wind, onto which video images were projected. The installation created space for female voices and narratives – both historical and contemporary – and addressed the themes of freedom, femininity, and emancipation. Texts by Christa Wolf, Stefanie-Lahya Aukongo, Angelika Nguyen, and Gabriele Stötzer were heard, selected in collaboration with Frauenkultur Leipzig and the Christa Wolf Society. The text by Angelika Nguyen is taken from her documentary film Bruderland ist abgebrannt (1991). Anna McCarthy, Manuela Ritz, and Sandra Juds performed the acting, and McCarthy was also responsible for the sound design. The project was supported by philosopher Karin Aleksander, board member of the Christa Wolf Society and employee at the Center for Transdisciplinary Gender Studies at Humboldt University of Berlin; the material was provided by Nani Weixler.

The installation was accompanied musically by, among other things, the song Ermutigung by Haiyti with the original version of the lyrics by Wolf Biermann.

In 2026, her installation Glasstides was nominated in the Mapping on Object category at the Video Mapping Awards in Lille, France.

=== Glasstides ===
In 2025, Hafenbrädl created the installation Glasstides, which was first shown as part of the exhibition "Land.schafft.Klang" (Land.creates.Sound) by the Art and Nature Foundation in Nantesbuch. The work combines glass art with video mapping and brings optical illusions on static objects to life. The installation shows a mountain of 128 broken glass panes. The rough and broken material symbolizes the immediacy and urgency of the climate crisis and the associated climate migration.

The work encourages reflection on questions of the habitability of places, the transformation of European landscapes, and the mixing of cultures. It reflects on human tradition in the face of nature's great cycles and invites us to surrender to the eternal rhythm of the tides.

The installation was funded by the Cultural Renewal Foundation and the Alexander Tutsek Foundation. The musical composition is by Andi Stecher (production, mixing, mastering) and Muezzo, whose alphorn polyphony was composed by Balthasar Streiff.

=== Your Scapes ===
In her work Your Scapes, Hafenbrädl combines video projection, handmade mirror glass, and ecopoetry to create an installation that addresses the deep roots of human existence in water. The installation consists of two projectors that project the audio waveform from two sides onto a hand-blown mirror glass cylinder. The resulting reflections fill the entire room in a 360-degree experience.

In this work, Hafenbrädl takes on the artistic challenge of conveying the urgency of climate change without losing poetic expression. To this end, she collaborated with artists who specialize in eco-poetry, including poet Craig Santos Perez and author Steinunn Sigurðardóttir. The acoustic layer was created using music by Roel Funcken and ambient sounds from Marc Chouarain's Cristal Baschet. Recordings by sea rescuers from the MS Iuventa and Anna McCarthy were also incorporated into the work.

=== Angel in the House ===
A central and long-term work is the installation Angel in the House. The title refers to the concept of the "angel in the house" coined by Virginia Woolf, which describes the idealized, selfless woman of the 19th century. In this work, Hafenbrädl explores the family history of the Hafenbrädl glassworks owners in the Bavarian Forest and questions the associated female gender roles.

The installation is a metaphor for breaking with convention. Hafenbrädl projects portraits of her sisters, her daughter, and oil paintings of her ancestors through a rotating, raw piece of optical glass. This glass was heated to the point of explosion during a scholarship from the Alexander Tutsek Foundation in the workshops of Bildwerk Frauenau. This causes the portraits to appear distorted and fragmented. The accompanying sound and text collage by artist and musician Anna McCarthy reinforces this idea. She creates a hypnotic web of field recordings and historical and contemporary text fragments based on real accounts of the glass dynasty. Voice recordings in German, English, and Czech, as well as samples of glass harmonicas and glass harps, create an atmospheric, dreamlike soundscape that seems to come from a dilapidated ballroom.

The work also ties in with the German fairy tale of Snow White, whose family were also mirror glass manufacturers, and draws parallels with the family "drama of Ludwigsthal," in which the women suffered similar fates due to imposed moral concepts. In 2022, Hafenbrädl performed the installation in the former family castle in Ludwigsthal and the neighboring Herz-Jesu-Kirche, accompanied by Marc Chouarain on the glass organ.

== Family history ==
The Hafenbrädl family was a glassblowing dynasty that specialized in the production of handmade mirrors, which were known for their exceptional height and width.

The origin of the family name goes back to an 18th-century tradition in Frauenau in the Bavarian Forest. According to legend, the family patriarch Georg Hafenbrädl was found as a foundling in the "Glashafen" on the Bavarian river Regen, abandoned on a wooden board. He was given the name "Hafenbrädl," under which he later ran a successful glassworks and established the family tradition.

== Exhibitions (selection) ==
=== Solo exhibitions ===
- 2021: Spiegel im Spiegel (video installation), Studio Rose, Schondorf am Ammersee, Germany
- 2022: Angel in the house (video installation), Ludwigsthal Castle and Church, Germany
- 2022: Geisterbesetzung - Lichtkunstspaziergang (Ghost Casting - Light Art Walk) (video mapping & sound collage), Künstlerhaus Gasteiger, Utting am Ammersee, Germany
- 2022: Buronale and "Kaufbeuren leuchtet" present: Vanessa Hafenbrädl – KB WIRWIRWIR, City Museum Kaufbeuren
- 2023: Wild Things – The Key, video installation about Jella Lepman at the Blutenburg International Children's and Youth Library, Munich
- 2025: Glasstides, (installation) Art and Nature Foundation, Langes Haus (Nantesbuch), Bad Heilbrunn
- 2025: DAS WORT - Resistance is not futile (Installation) Your Scapes and Glasstides in the Buxheim choir stalls and the Buxheim Charterhouse, Germany
- 2025: Glasstides, St. Anna (Romenthal), Germany
- 2025: Dyad (video installation), Taubenturm, Monastery Dießen am Ammersee
- 2025: Francis Preaches to the Birds (video installation), St. John the Baptist, Peißenberg

=== Group exhibitions ===
- 2016: List í ljósi lightart festival – Seyðisfjörður, Iceland
- 2018: 2nd Weilheim Light Art Festival, Germany
- 2018: Antipode – Hydroshield Projection (video installation) "Lux Light Festival" Wellington
- 2018: Erlinde – Hydroshield Projection "Lux Light Festival" in Wellington, New Zealand
- 2020: Grim white (video mapping) at the Luminale, Frankfurt am Main, Germany
- 2021: Bright festival at the Kunstkraftwerk in Leipzig (360-degree projection)
- 2021: Zugspitze in Glass at The Glass – Meet the Future 2021 Film Festival in Lybster, Scotland
- 2021: Mise en abyme – Der Spiegel im Spiegel (video installation), Transformations, Schlehdorf Abbey, Schlehdorf
- 2022: HI – touched (video projection), Evilichtungen – Artificiality and Nature Edition 2022, Hildesheim
- 2024: Spiegelgedicht (mirror poem) (video/mirror object), < 10 percent commissioned by the city of Pforzheim for the junge Galerie Pforzheim
- 2024: Your Scapes – Regina (360°/audio/video/glass), Relight Festival, Regensburg
- 2025: Glasstides (installation) "Goldstücke. Light – Art – Projects Gelsenkirchen," Gelsenkirchen
- 2025: No Flag, Leipzig Festival of Lights
- 2026: USHIS – No Flag. Just Fire. (video installation), Zamma-Festival, Unterschleißheim (Cooperation with the Forum Unterschleißheim Alliance for Democracy and Diversity)
- 2026: No Flag, Relight – Festival in Regensburg, Germany
- 2026: Glasstides (Installation), Blik Blik Festival - kostel Nanebevzetí Panny Marie in Plzeň, Czech Republic

=== Performances/Concerts ===
- 2016: Light tunnel performance for Anna McCarthy at Wiedemann Sanatorium, Ambach
- 2022: Metamorphosis, Duo Amabile, Kunstkraftwerk Leipzig, Musikbrauerei Berlin, and Tonalisaal Hamburg

=== Stage works ===
- 2017: Lilja 4-ever (video), Director: Anja Sczilinski, Residence Theatre Munich
- 2024: The Hills Have Crazy Eyes. Woman in a landscape (video), Münchner Kammerspiele
- 2024: Reset. Everything breathes! (video), Ufo, Deutsche Oper am Rhein, Düsseldorf
- 2025: Discofox im Dachsbau (video), directed by Elle-Kollektiv, starring Lara Paschke and Luis Lüps, music by Jakob Lakner, Stadttheater Landsberg

== Awards ==
- 2016: Winner of the Genius Loci Weimar
- 2020: Scholarship from the Alexander Tutsek Foundation
- 2021: Nomination for the Tassilo Award
- 2022: Video Art Award from the Filmzeit Festival Kaufbeuren of the Stadtmuseum Kaufbeuren
- 2023: Tassilo Award Grand Prize
- 2024: Gile Haindl-Steiner Scholarship
- 2026: Nominated, Video Mapping Awards (Lille, France) in the Mapping on Object category for her installation Glasstides.

== Artistic classification ==
Hafenbrädl's work is characterized by a heterogeneous formal and thematic orientation and can only be classified to a limited extent within existing art-historical categories. In the Süddeutsche Zeitung, journalist and art historian Katja Sebald highlighted this characteristic in 2023, writing:

Wer versucht, dieser Künstlerin ein Etikett aufzukleben, der wird zwangsläufig scheitern.
[Anyone who tries to label this artist will inevitably fail.]

— Katja Sebald, Süddeutsche Zeitung

== Other activities ==
In the 1990s, she was active as a Video jockey under the pseudonym "Dieselqueen." During this time, she was also involved as an activist in the wagon park scene, including in Freiburg and at the Bambule (wagon park) in Hamburg, where she campaigned for free spaces and alternative forms of living.

Hafenbrädl is also a co-founder and was an honorary board member of the Freie Kunstanstalt e. V. in Dießen, an inclusive cultural center for children, young people, and adults.

In addition, she was involved in planning the "Freiham Future Lightwalk" cultural walk in Munich and the "Freiräume gestalten, Charme erhalten" (Create free spaces, preserve charm) demonstration in Dießen.

== Miscellaneous ==
Vanessa Hafenbrädl has lived in Dießen am Ammersee since 2015.

== Literature (selection) ==
- Women Light Artists. Volume 2, Light Collective, United Kingdom 2025, ISBN 978-1-73914-165-3, pp. 212–216.
- Almost like magic – Video artist Vanessa Hafenbrädl brings paintings to life Series: Strong women, bold ideas, wild lives., Portrait written by Katja Sebald in SeeMagazin 2023 № 19. pp. 88–91. (in German)
- Katja Sebald: Mysterious fairy-tale worlds In: Süddeutsche Zeitung (in German), February 17, 2023
- Armin Greune: "Dream creatures made of light and glass" In: Süddeutsche Zeitung (in German), April 21, 2021
- Karin Kampwerth: Three times well deserved In: Süddeutsche Zeitung (in German), March 31, 2023 (in German)
- Jutta Czeguhn: Beautiful unrest created by light beings – artist Vanessa Hafenbrädl illuminates Pasing Town Hall In: Süddeutsche Zeitung (in German), September 19, 2021
- Susanne Greiner: A sparkling mountain of glass: Vanessa Hafenbrädl's "Glasstides" in Dießen In: Merkur (in German), May 19, 2025
