= Katja =

- Gender: Female

Origin
- Language: Greek
- Meaning: Pure
- Region of origin: Europe

Other names
- Related names: Katherine, Katya

Katja is a feminine given name. In Germany, the Netherlands, Flanders, and Scandinavia, it is a pet form of Katherine.

== People with the first name Katja ==
=== Actresses ===
- Katja Flint (born 1959), German actress
- Katja Herbers (born 1980), Dutch actress
- Katja Küttner (née Kukkola; born 1971), Finnish actress
- Katja Medbøe (1945–1996), Norwegian actress
- Katja Paryla (1940–2013), German actress, stage director and theatre director
- Katja Riemann (born 1963), German actress
- Katja Schuurman (born 1975), Dutch actress, singer and television personality
- Katja Woywood (born 1971), German actress, former child star
- Katja Zoch (born 1961), American voice actress

=== Musicians ===
- Katja Andy (1906–2013), German-American pianist
- Katja Ebstein (born 1945), German singer
- Katja Moslehner German singer
- Katja Glieson, Australian recording artist

=== Politicians ===
- Katja Adler (born 1974), German politician
- Katja Boh (1929–2008), Slovenian sociologist, diplomat, politician
- Katja Gabriëls (born 1975), Belgian politician
- Katja Kipping (born 1978), German politician, chairwoman of the Left Party
- Katja Husen (1976–2022), German politician
- Katja Maurer (born 1991), Soviet-born German politician
- Katja Mitteldorf (born 1985), German politician
- Katja Poschmann (born 1980), German politician
- Katja Strauss-Köster (born 1970), German politician
- Katja Suding (born 1975), German politician

=== Athletes ===
- Katja Demut (born 1983), German triple jumper
- Katja Dieckow (born 1984), German diver
- Katja Ebbinghaus (born 1948), German tennis player
- Katja Gerber (born 1975), German judoka
- Katja Haller (born 1981), Italian professional biathlete
- Katja Homeyer (born 1969), German wheel gymnast, coach, and sports official
- Katja Keller (born 1980), German heptathlete
- Katja Koren (born 1975), former Slovenian alpine skier
- Katja Kraus (born 1970), German footballer
- Katja Langkeit (born 1983), German handball player
- Katja Lehto, Finnish ice hockey player
- Katja Mayer (born 1968), German triathlete
- Katja Nass (born 1968), German fencer
- Katja Nyberg (born 1979), (naturalized) Norwegian handball player
- Katja Orschmann (born 1998), German footballer
- Katja Požun (born 1993), Slovenian ski jumper
- Katja Rajaniemi, Finnish ski-orienteering competitor
- Katja Riipi, Finnish ice hockey player
- Katja Roose (born 1981), Dutch professional kite surfer
- Katja Schroffenegger, Italian football goalkeeper
- Katja Schülke (born 1984), German handball player
- Katja Seizinger (born 1972), German alpine skier
- Katja Tengel (born 1981), German sprinter
- Katja Višnar (born 1984), Slovenian cross-country skier
- Katja Vuković (born 2006), Croatian handball player
- Katja Ziliox (born 1970), German swimmer

=== Miscellaneous ===
- Katja von der Bey (born 1962), German art historian and feminist
- Katja Fennel, marine biologist
- Katja von Garnier (born 1966), German film director
- Katja Hoyer (born 1985), German historian and writer
- Katja Kallio (born 1968), Finnish novelist, journalist, columnist and screenwriter
- Katja Mragowska (born 1975), Polish-German artist
- Katja Oxman (born 1942), German-born American visual artist
- Katja Pettersson, Swedish designer
- Katja Rahlwes (born 1967), German fashion photographer
- Katja Sebald, German art historian, author, journalist, curator and translator
- Katja Shchekina (born 1986), Russian supermodel
- Katja Špur (1908–1991), Slovene journalist, writer, poet, translator
- Katja Thater (born 1966), German poker player
- Katja Tukiainen (born 1969), Finnish artist
- Katja Urbatsch (born 1979), co-founder and Managing Director of the non-profit organization ArbeiterKind.de
- Katja Wulff (1890–1992), German-Swiss dancer

== Fictional characters ==
- Katja, an antagonist in the Swedish adventure game Star Stable
- Katja Brandner, a character on the German soap opera Verbotene Liebe
- Katja, a character from the Walking Dead video game.
- Katja Hertz, a playable character in the Korean MOBA Eternal Return

== See also ==
- 1113 Katja, an asteroid
- Katia
- Katya
