= Katya =

- Pronunciation: Russian: [ˈkatʲə]
- Gender: Female

Other names
- Related names: Yekaterina, Katherine, Catherine, Katja

Katya is a feminine given name. It is a very popular name in Russia, Ukraine, Bulgaria, Serbia, and North Macedonia. It is a Russian diminutive form of Yekaterina, which is a Russian form of Katherine. The name is sometimes used as an independent given name in the English-speaking world. In German, Dutch and Scandinavian languages it is spelled Katja. Katya may also refer to:

In the arts:

- Katya Chilly (born 1978), Ukrainian singer
- Katya Jones (born 1989), Russian dancer
- Katya Lee (born 1984), Russian singer songwriter and fashion designer
- Katya Medvedeva (born 1937), Russian naïve painter
- Katya Paskaleva (1945–2002), Bulgarian actress
- Katya Reimann (born 1965), American writer of fantasy novels
- Katya Santos (born 1982), Filipina actress and model
- Katya Zamolodchikova, (performed by Brian McCook, born 1982), American drag queen

In other fields:

- Katya Adler (born 1972), British journalist
- Yekaterina Budanova (1916–1943), also known as Katya, female Soviet fighter ace in the Second World War
- Katya De Giovanni, Maltese politician
- Kattya González (born 1977), Paraguayan politician
- Katya Scheinberg, Russian-American applied mathematician
- Katya Soldak (born 1977), journalist and documentary filmmaker (documentary The Long Breakup, 2020)

In fiction:

- Katya Derevko, on the ABC television series Alias
- Katya Kinski, on the Australian soap opera Neighbours
- Katya Nadanova, Bond girl in the game James Bond 007: Everything or Nothing
- Katya Orlova, heroine of John le Carré's novel The Russia House and the film adaptation
- Katya Vogt, the protagonist of Sandra Birdsell's historical novel The Russländer (aka Katya)
- Katya (Highlander), an Immortal in Highlander: The Series
- Katya, a character in the 2013 movie Stalingrad.
- Katya Udinov, Alexandra Udinov's mother in Nikita
- Katya, fictional villain portrayed by Danny Denzongpa in the 1996 Indian film Ghatak
- Katya Michailov Goncharova, a character from the internet meme/nonexistent movie Goncharov (1973)

== Other uses ==
- Katya (spider), a genus of spiders
