= Luzifer =

Luzifer may refer to:

- the German noun for Lucifer
- Luzifer (restaurant chain), a German restaurant chain
- Luzifer (film), a 2021 Austrian horror film
- a pseudonym for Lu Märten (1879-1970), German writer and activist
