= H.S. Skovoroda Kharkiv National Pedagogical University =

University in Kharkiv, Ukraine

Coordinates: 50.019°N 36.317°E

- Харківський національний педагогічний університет імені Григорія Сковороди (Kharkivskyi natsionalnyi pedahohichnyi universytet imeni H.S.Skovorody)
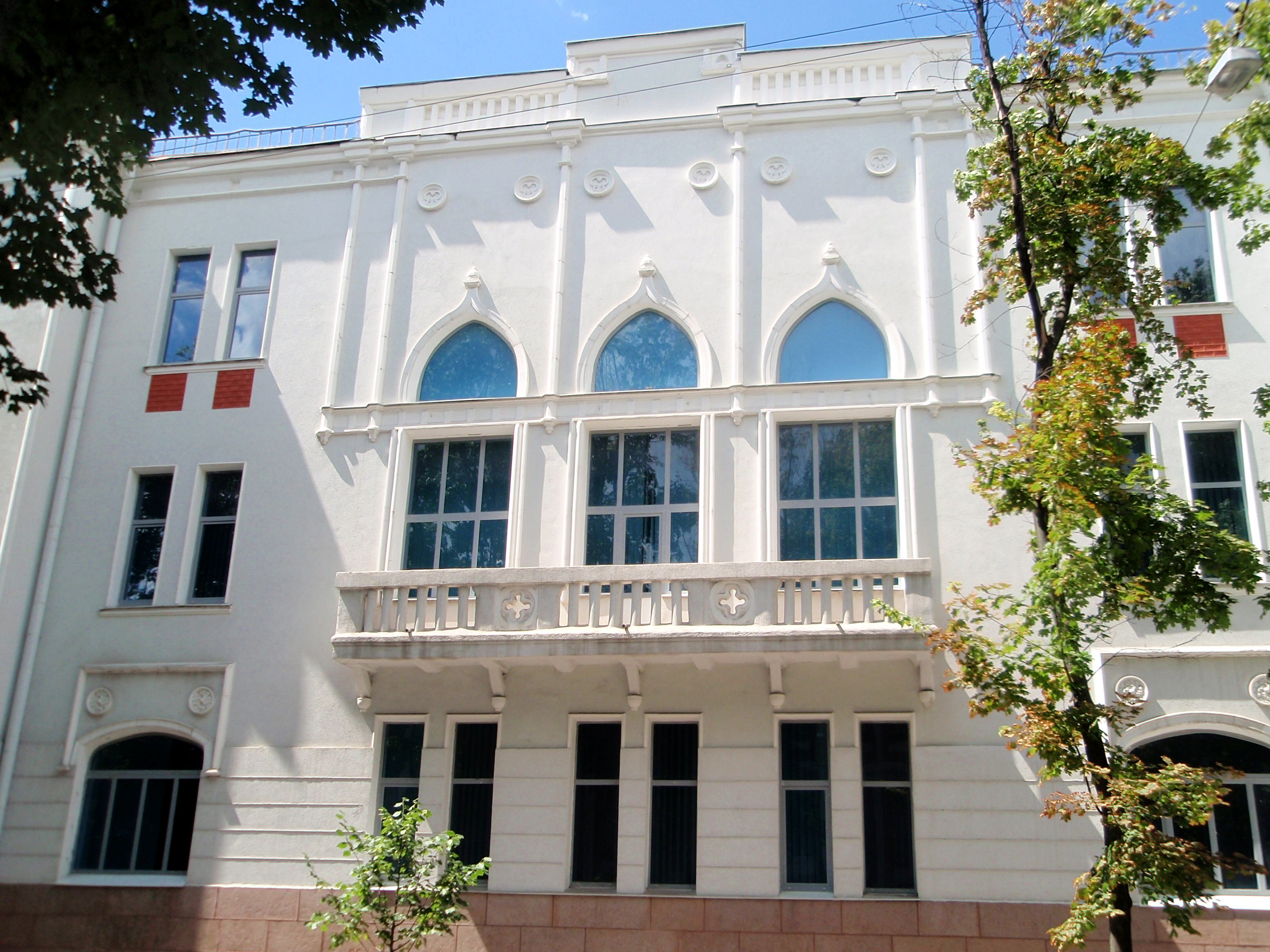
- Main building
- Motto: Eruditio salvabit Ukrainam
- Established: 1933; 93 years ago
- Affiliations: Ministry of Education and Science of Ukraine
- Rector: Yuriy Boychuk
- Students: 10000
- Location: Kharkiv, Ukraine
- Website: Official website

Immovable Monument of Local Significance of Ukraine
- Official name: «Педінститут» (Pedagogical University)
- Type: Urban Planning, Architecture
- Reference no.: 7007-Ха

The H.S. Skovoroda Kharkiv National Pedagogical University (Ukrainian: Харківський національний педагогічний університет імені Григорія Сковороди) is a Ukrainian public university in Kharkiv founded in 1933.

== History ==
The Skovoroda Kharkiv National Pedagogical University, a higher school for training school teachers, was founded in 1933 on the basis of the All-Ukrainian Institute of Public Education named after M. O. Skrypnyk (in 1931–1932 – the Institute of Social Education). The claim that this university has over 220 years of history is untrue..

In 1945, the newly established institute was named after the philosopher H. S. Skovoroda.

In the 1960s, the institute had over 3,000 students; 4 faculties (Physics and Mathematics, Philology, Natural Sciences, and Physical Education), evening and correspondence departments, and a postgraduate program.

In 1994, according to a decree of the Cabinet of Ministers of Ukraine, the status of the Kharkiv State Pedagogical Institute named after H. S. Skovoroda was changed—it was transformed into the Kharkiv State Pedagogical University named after H. S. Skovoroda.

In 2004, the university was granted national status and has since been called Kharkiv National Pedagogical University named after H. S. Skovoroda.

On the university grounds stood a monument to the Ukrainian philosopher Hryhorii Skovoroda, which was unveiled on September 28, 2012, but was destroyed on the night of July 6, 2022 (around 00:15) as a result of a missile strike by the Russian army from Belgorod. The building of the Kharkiv National Pedagogical University named after H. S. Skovoroda was also destroyed. Three floors of the central building collapsed. Additionally, a 40-year-old university guard died at the scene.

== Campuses and buildings ==
- Alchevskyh st., 29

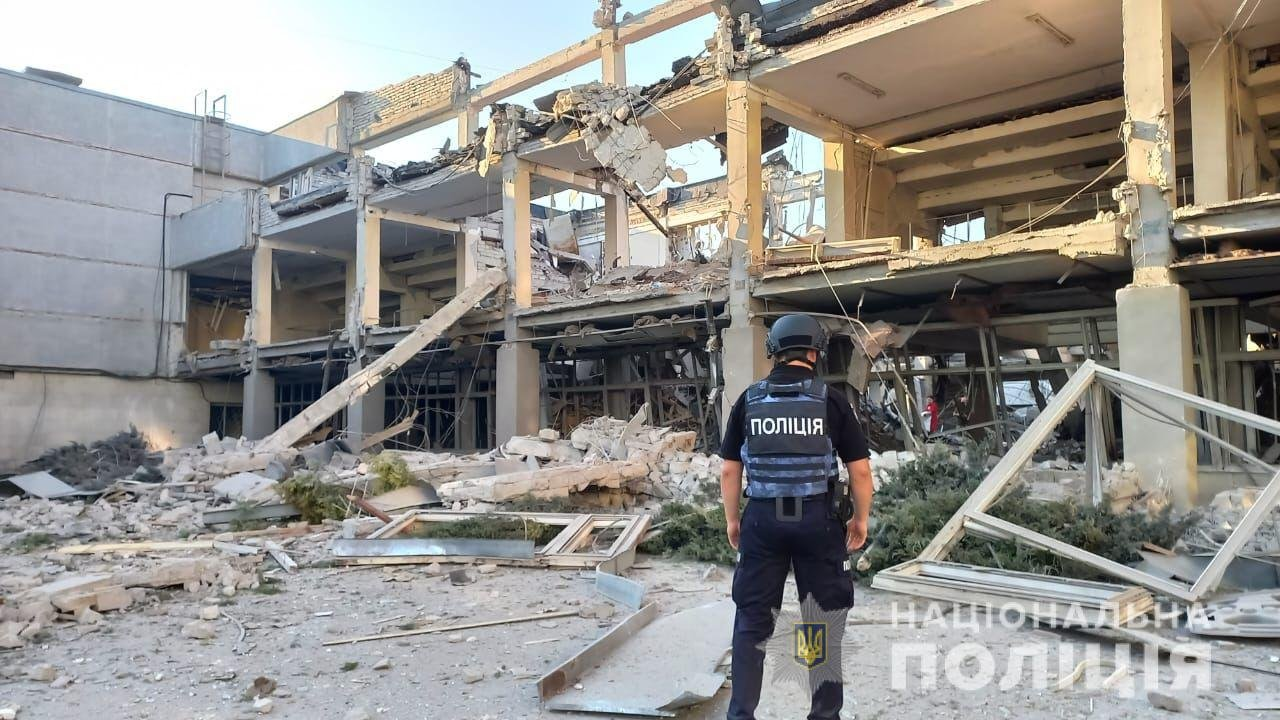
Building on Valentynivska street after Russian rocket strike

- Valentynivska st., 2 (destroyed by Russian shelling on July 6, 2022)
- Chernyshevska st., 60
- Faninskyi st., 3

Campus:

- Faninskyi st., 3-V
- Yuvileiniy Ave., 50
- Hvardiitsіv Shironіntsіv st., 41-A
- Liudviha Svobody Ave., 53-B

== Institutes and faculties ==
1 Institute: Institute of Postgraduate Education and Management

10 Faculties: History and Law; Natural, special and health education; Ukrainian Language and Literature Faculty named after G.F. Kwitka-Osnovyanenko; Preschool education; Foreign Philology; Arts; Primary education; Social and Behavioral Sciences; Physical Education and Sports; Physics and Mathematics

== Notable alumni ==
- Katya Soldak, journalist and documentary filmmaker (documentary The Long Breakup, 2020)
- "Zhanneta Kozina; Козіна Жаннета Леонідівна, Козина Жаннета Леонидовна"., scientist in the field of sports science, editor-in-chief of the journal "Здоровье, спорт, реабилитация, Health, sport, rehabilitation; Здоров'я, спорт, реабілітація"., which is indexed in the "Scopus". scientometric database, alumn of graduate school 1993

== See also ==
List of universities in Ukraine
