= Anna McCarthy =

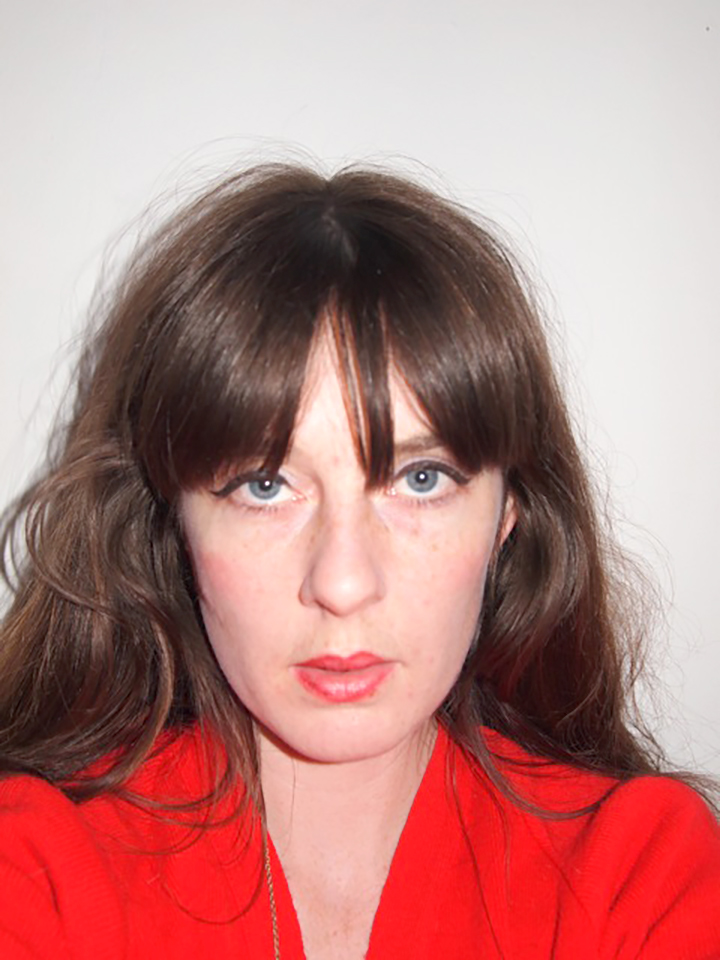
- Anna McCarthy, 2017
- Born: Anna McCarthy; 1981 (age 44–45); Munich-Neuperlach, Germany
- Education: Kingston University
- Known for: Performance, sculpture, visual art

Anna McCarthy (born 1981 in Munich-Neuperlach) is an Irish multidisciplinary artist, who lives and works in Munich. McCarthy's projects are usually based on a political idea and historical research. Typical of her work are her journalistic gesture, combined with Poetry and Humor. Her work is wide-ranging and includes performative Installation with elements of Concert and Musical and Painting, Drawing and Film.

== Life and work ==
McCarthy is the daughter of a social worker and an aircraft engineer. The family moved from Blackpool to Rosenheim. McCarthy's interest in art, music and Munich's nightlife was awakened early on by her older brothers. One of the two brothers is Nick McCarthy, who was the band Franz Ferdinand's guitarist in the early 2000's.

McCarthy's work is multidisciplinary: her work consists of painting and drawing, installations, books, films, music, musicals, parades and demonstrations. She works over a longer period of time in different formats. Her humorous and poetic works, in which she calls for rebellion and refusal, usually have a political aim and are often based on historical research. She uses elements of pop culture and enjoys collaborating with fellow artists. Her work has been compared to artists such as David Hammons, Eva Hesse or Ana Mendieta.

In 2001 she studied at Kingston University. From 2002 to 2009, McCarthy studied Sculpture at the Academy of Fine Arts Munich and practiced in various areas such as Video Art, installation, painting and Music. 2005-2007, she studied Environmental Art at the Glasgow School of Art.

In her project How to Start a Revolution, which consists of a musical (2013), a book (2016), film works, among others, she dealt with clichés of rebelliousness, embedded in contemporary socio-political events and included the artist's personal environment. How to Start a Revolution has been exhibited internationally, including in galleries in London, Glasgow and Iceland., solo exhibitions and group exhibitions including "Hints to Workmen" with @Harun Farocki at the Nottingham Gallery for Contemporary Art and performances of "How to Start a Revolution: The Musical" at Haus der Kunst Munich and Goethe University Frankfurt. In 2015, McCarthy was a fellow of the Villa Aurora in Los Angeles. Her short film Fassbinder in La-La-Land was made here, which was commissioned by the Munich Fassbindertag e. V. In the film, McCarthy depicts a kind of female Rainer Werner Fassbinder living in exile in LA.

2007-2015 was McCarthy member of the eight-piece band Damenkapelle, she played Bass and sang. The band released their debut album on the Munich label Echokammer in 2012 and moves stylistically between pop, punk and performance.

From 2012 to 2014 McCarthy curated the reading series No Country for odd poets together with Federico Sánchez in the Kunstverein München. Here, protagonists of the performance and literature scene were invited, among them the filmmaker Chris Kraus, the poet John Giorno, Wolfgang Müller, ex-member of The Deadly Doris, and the German writer Emine Sevgi Özdamar.

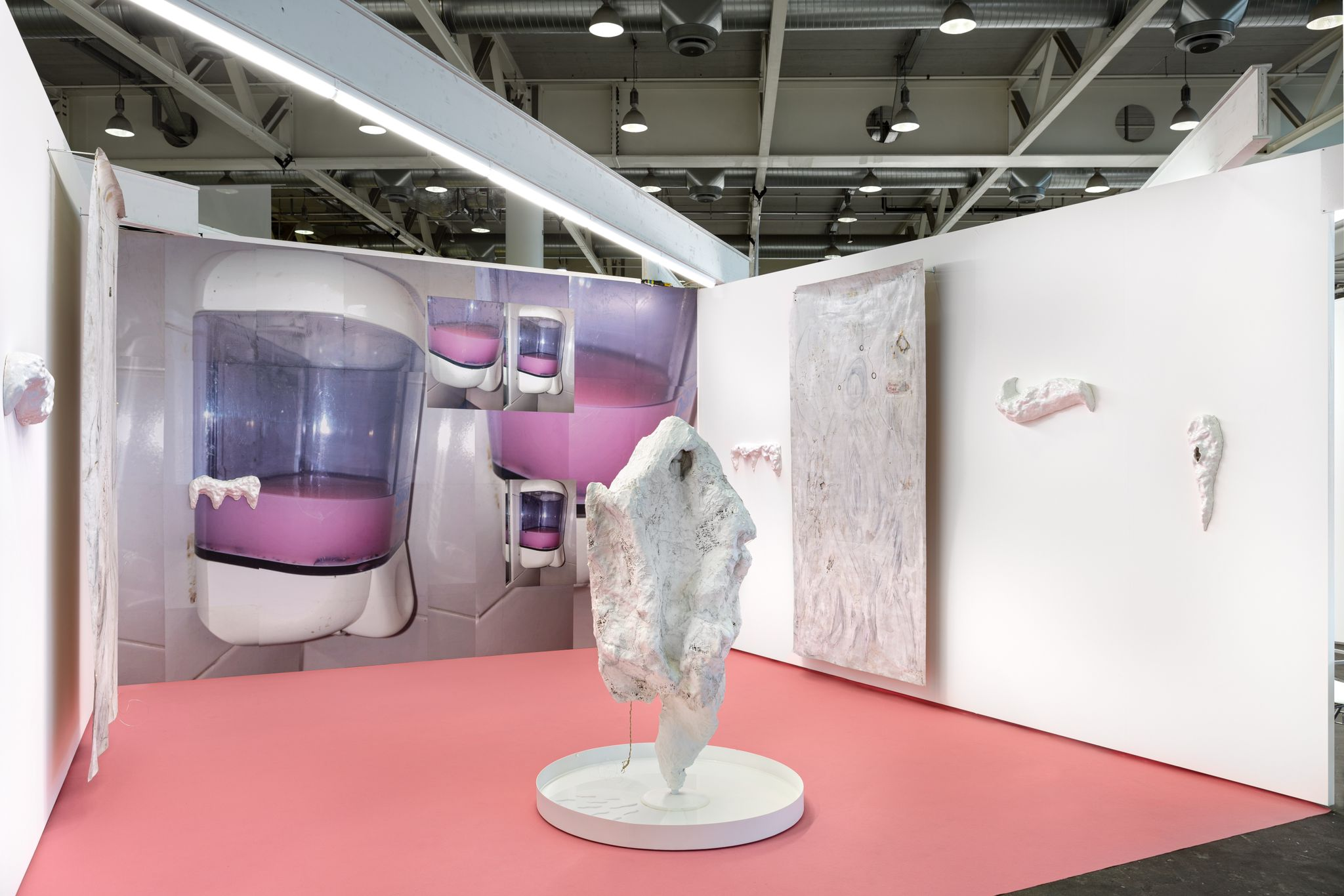
Installation „Creatures in the Soap“, Liste Art Fair Basel, 2023

As a Guest lecturer of the Munich Academy of arts, she held a seminar in 2020 that dealt with the "political life-reform movement". She currently teaches at the University of Applied Arts in Vienna. PUBLICATIONS - Gelatin Jaws, McCarthy is in charge of the performance and multimedia workshop of the municipal youth cultural center "Die Färberei" in Munich. Here, in 2020, during the COVID-19-Pandemics the online workshop Quarantine Artist Book, where she explains how to create and bind an artist's book, quoting Ray Johnsons Mail Art, among other things. Furthermore, McCarthy is active in the Munich cultural center Köşk and participates in youth projects of the Bellevue of Monaco and the Münchner Kammerspiele.

== What Are People For? ==
In 2017, McCarthy had her first solo exhibition What are people for? at the Kunstverein Goettingen. Under the same title and with elements from this exhibition, she wrote performances in collaboration with the musician and composer Manuela Rzytki, which were shown in Munich, Berlin and Reykjavík. In the same year, at the invitation of the artists' initiative, McCarthy spent Popps Packinga studio stay in Hamtramck, Michigan. In 2018 the performance What Are People For? received the Rodeo Prize at the Rodeo Festival with which they traveled to the Performing Arts Festival in Berlin with a sold-out performance at Ballhaus Ost, Berlin.

McCarthy's band, What Are People For?, with Manuela Rzytki, Paulina Nolte and Tom Wu came from these performances. They released an album of the same name in 2022 on the label Alien Transistor (by The Notwist), with a release performance on the main stage of the Münchner Kammerspiele, together with the band F.S.K.. According to the SZ review, the music on it moves between Spoken Word, Post-Wave and Electropunk. McCarthy, who was responsible for lyrics and vocals, cites Moor Mother, Kae Tempest, Lil Simzand the Sleaford Mods as role models. In 2024, they toured Germany, the Netherlands and Great Britain together with their label mates The Notwist. In 2025, they played as support for @TV on the Radio at Astra Berlin. In the year 2025 they played the New Year's Concert in the Kunstsammlung Nordrehein Westfalen K21 in Düsseldorf.

McCarthy is, as of 2026, represented by Galerie Sperling in Munich and Galerie Diana in Milan.

== Exhibitions and Performances (Selection) ==
- 2013: NA-EN-DE-NA-EN-DE-NA-WI-DA II, "showcase" of the Pinakothek der Moderne, Munich
- 2014: Nein "Platform Munich"
- 2014: Performance How To Start a Revolution: The Musical im Maximiliansforum, Munich
- 2015: Project Biennial of Contemporary Art, D-0 ARK Underground, Bosnien-Herzegowina
- 2016: Favorites III: New Art from Munich, together with eleven other artists in theLenbachhaus, Munich
- 2017: What are people for? - Kunstverein Göttingen
- 2017: Die Hölle im Valentin-Karlstadt-Musäum, Munich
- 2018: Performance How To Start a Revolution: The Musicalin the context of the exhibition Art of Revolt // Revolt of Art, organized by the Offenes Haus der Kulturen e. V., Frankfurt am Main
- 2019: Bloodless Boutiquein the German Butchers' Museum in Böblingen
- 2020: Adventure Room at Galerie Sperling, Munich
- 2021: Global Angst in the Muffathalle and in Munich's public space, together with Chicks on Speed, Der Plan, Bavarian Refugee Council u. a.
- 2022: Washing Cycle at Galerie Sperling, Munich
- 2023: Creatures In The Soap, Liste Art Fair Basel
- 2024: Volatile, Galeria Diana, Milan
- 2024: The Hills Have Crazy Eyes. Woman in a landscape, Münchner Kammerspiele
- 2025: not dying. An exhibition based on Ingeborg Bachmanns "Types of Death Project".Group exhibition together with Christiane Blattmann, Brigitte Dunkel, Nora Hansen, Kate Mackeson, Dorothee Elmiger,Heike Geißleru. a.,House Rüschhaus, Münster
- 2025: I Hear a New World No. 3, interim quarters of theVilla Stuckat Goethestraße 54, together with Nathaniel Russell, Annabel Wright, Tetsuya Umeda, Anne Brugni and others.

== Video works (selection) ==
- 2019 – 2020: Bloodless Boutique,Bloodless PoolandBloodless Brandhorst. Digital video series in collaboration with Paulina Nolte. The third part was commissioned by the Museum Brandhorst.
- 2025: screening of Volatile together with Keren Cytter at Filmuseum Munich.

== Stage design ==
- 2023: Who is afraid of fuck you all? The Story of Kathy Acker– A body-erotic punk biopic. Staging on ETA Hoffmann Theater, Bamberg. Director: Paula Thielecke

== Publications (selection) ==
- 2024: Trickles & Oozes, Edition Taube
- 2024: The Hills Have Crazy Eyes - Woman in a Landscape, Edition Taube
- 2016: How to Start a Revolution – The Musical. Edition Taube, ISBN 978-3-945900-07-9
- 2017: What are people for? Edited by Anja Lückenkemper, design by Studio Jung. Hammann von Mier Verlag, Munich / Kunstverein Göttingen, ISBN 978-3-947250-04-2
- 2022: Gelatine Jaws, Hammann von Mier Verlag, Munich, ISBN 978-3-947250-44-8
- 2024: Trickles & Oozes. Edition Taube, ISBN 978-3-68917-003-5

== Awards ==
- 2009: Leonhard and Ida Wolf Memorial Prize
- 2014: Contemporary Art Prize, Kunstclub13
- 2014: Förderpreis für junge Kunst des Kunstclub 13 e.V. for the exhibitionNo
- 2016: Bavarian Arts Prize, special prize for "Sound and Noises"
- 2018: Prize of the Munich Dance and Theatre Festival Rodeo to Anna McCarthy and Manuela Rzytki for the production What are people for?

== Discography (selection) ==
- 2008: As contributors in addition to Yoko Ono, Ted Gaier, Cobra Killer u. a.: Tribute to Gustav Metzger. Compilation, curated by Justin Hoffmann, belleville Verlag, ISBN 978-3-943157-37-6
- 2012: As a member of the band Damenkapelle: Damenkapelle. Echo Chamber
- 2018: As a member of the band in addition toZoro Babel, Sachiko Hara, Albert Pöschl, Manuela Rzytki, Pico B:, Salewski: Songs, Echo Chamber
- 2022: As singer and lyricist of the band: What Are People For? Alien Transistor / Morr Music,
- 2023: Speech singing during the play So Funnyon the album Extremely serious music by Rumpeln

== Works in Collections ==
- Bavarian State Painting Collections
- Münchner Stadtmuseum, fig.
- Städtische Galerie im Lenbachhaus, Munich Re, DE
- Bundeskunstsammlung, DE
