= Ekaterina Andreeva (arachnologist) =

Uzbek arachnologist (1941–2008)

- Born: 16 November 1941; Tashkent, Uzbek SSR, USSR (now Uzbekistan)
- Died: 18 September 2008 (aged 66); Milanówek, Poland
- Other name: Katarzyna Andrejewa-Prószyńska
- Occupation: arachnologist
- Spouse: Jerzy Prószyński

Ekaterina Mikhailovna Andreeva also known as Katarzyna Andrejewa-Prószyńska (16 November 1941 – 18 September 2008) was an Uzbek arachnologist. She collected spiders in Central Asia and later published Spiders of Tajikistan. At least eight spider and harvestman taxa were named in her honor.

== Life ==
Andreeva was born on 16 November 1941 in Tashkent (the current capital of Uzbekistan) and spent some of her childhood in Samarkand. Her grandmother, Maria Vikentievna Jasiewicz, was Polish, but had been exiled to Central Asia in the late 1880s for her political activity, and there married a land surveyor Konstantin Pisarczik, and had four children, including Andreeva's mother, Antonina Konstantinovna. Antonina became a student of ethnography at Tashkent University, and later married a professor of ethnography from the university, Mikhail Stepanovich Andreev. Their daughter Ekaterina Andreeva was born in Tashkent in 1941, and in 1946 moved with her mother to Dushanbe in Tajikistan. She was invited by her mother on ethnographic expeditions throughout Tajikistan. Her family had to conceal their true thoughts about the Soviet Union due to fear of persecution, imprisonment, and potential execution.

In 1960, Andreeva began her biological studies at a local university, where she spent her time working alone to research spiders that are located in Tajikistan. No specialists of Central Asian spiders existed during this period. In 1966, Andreeva completed her university course and obtained a PhD scholarship in Tajikistan, spending several months each year working in the Entomology Department of the Leningrad University under the official supervision of Professor Victor Tyshchenko, who worked on spiders in Kazakhstan. Therefore, she is referred to as a representative of Leningrad arachnological school.

== Career ==
From 1966 to 1971, Andreeva most intensively collected spiders in Central Asia by herself, particularly in high mountainous regions. Her unique spider collection is a source for conducting revisions and taxonomic surveys of Central Asia. In September 1972, she married Polish arachnologist Jerzy Prószyński and moved to Poland. The main reason for her moving to Poland was due to failing at becoming employed at the Zoological Institute in Leningrad which is considered the best place in the USSR to study taxonomy.

In 1974, she participated in the International Arachnological Congress in Amsterdam. In 1976, Andreeva published Spiders of Tajikistan which is a taxonomic book on spiders in central Asia that is still used for "revisions and taxonomic surveys of that area". She used her own funds to publish Spiders of Tajikistan and it is the first USSR publication of an original monograph about Central Asian spiders. Andreeva's mother helped her edit the book.

Andreeva died during medical examination preparing for major surgery on 18 September 2008 in Milanówek, Poland.

== Honors ==
The participants of the XVIII International Arachnological Congress that took place in 2010 in Siedlce, Poland received a collection of abstracts dedicated to the memory of Andreeva and other outstanding arachnologists who died recently.

At least eight spider and harvestman taxa were named in her honor. The genus Katya is also named for her.

== Notable publications ==
- Andreeva, E.M. 1968. Materialy po faune paukov Tadzikistana. III. Mygalomorphae. Doklady Akademii Nauk Tadzhikistan SSR 11: 68–71 (in Russian).
- Andreeva, E.M. & Tyshchenko, V.P. 1968. Materials on the fauna of spiders (Aranei) of Tadjikistan. II. Zodariidae. Zoologicheskiĭ Zhurnal 47: 684–689 (in Russian).
- Andreeva, E.M. & Tyshchenko, V.P. 1969. [On the fauna of spiders (Araneae) from Tadjikistan. Haplogynae, Cribellatae, Ecribellatae Trionychae (Pholcidae, Palpimanidae, Hersiliidae, Oxyopidae)]. Entomologicheskoe Obozrenie 48: 373–384. (in Russian).
- Andreeva, E.M. 1975 Distribution and ecology of spiders (Aranei) in Tadjikistan. Fragmenta Faunistica, Warsaw 20: 323–352.
- Andreeva, E.M. 1976 Pauki Tajikistana. Dushanbe, 196pp.
- Andreeva, E.M., Hęciak, S. & Prószyński, J. 1984. Remarks on Icius and Pseudicius (Araneae, Salticidae) mainly from central Asia. Annales Zoologici 37: 349–375.

== Taxon names authored ==
The World Spider Catalog lists the following names of which Andreeva is the author or co-author:

- Alioranus avanturus Andreeva & Tystshenko, 1970 – synonym of Alioranus chiardolae
- Anemesia karatauvi (Andreeva, 1968)
- Attulus ansobicus (Andreeva, 1976)
- Benoitia tadzhika (Andreeva, 1976)
- Bogdocosa kronebergi (Andreeva, 1976)
- Chalcoscirtus ansobicus Andreeva, 1976
- Cyrba tadzika Andreeva, 1969 – synonym of Cyrba ocellata
- Devade hispida (Andreeva & Tystshenko, 1969) – synonym of Devade tenella
- Dolomedes tadzhikistanicus Andreeva, 1976
- Erigone charitonowi Andreeva & Tystshenko, 1970 – nomen dubium
- Evippa beschkentica Andreeva, 1976
- Lathys spasskyi Andreeva & Tystshenko, 1969
- Mogrus antoninus Andreeva, 1976
- Mogrus faizabadicus Andreeva, Kononenko & Prószyński, 1981
- Nepalicius nepalicus (Andreeva, Hęciak & Prószyński, 1984)
- Oecobius tadzhikus Andreeva & Tystshenko, 1969
- Oxyopes takobius Andreeva & Tystshenko, 1969
- Pellenes kulabicus Andreeva, 1976 – synonym of Pellenes geniculatus
- Pellenes tocharistanus Andreeva, 1976
- Plexippus dushanbinus Andreeva, 1969
- Pseudomogrus bactrianus (Andreeva, 1976)
- Rudakius afghanicus (Andreeva, Hęciak & Prószyński, 1984)
- Rudakius spasskyi (Andreeva, Hęciak & Prószyński, 1984)
- Styloctetor asiaticus (Andreeva & Tystshenko, 1970) – synonym of Styloctetor romanus
- Synageles charitonovi Andreeva, 1976
- Synageles ramitus Andreeva, 1976
- Ummidia gandjinoi (Andreeva, 1968)
- Zaitunia beshkentica (Andreeva & Tystshenko, 1969)
- Zaitunia martynovae (Andreeva & Tystshenko, 1969)
- Zodariellum surprisum Andreeva & Tystshenko, 1968
- Zodarion continentale Andreeva & Tystshenko, 1968
- Zodarion martynovae Andreeva & Tystshenko, 1968
- Zodarion tadzhikum Andreeva & Tystshenko, 1968

== Taxa named in her honor ==
Spider and harvestman species named in honor of Andreeva include:

- Aelurillus andreevae Nenilin, 1984
- Aelurillus catherinae Prószyński, 2000
- Anemesia andreevae Zonstein, 2018
- Chalcoscirtus catherinae Prószyński, 2000
- Euophrys catherinae Prószyński, 2000
- Homolophus andreevae Staręga & Snegovaya, 2008 (harvestman)
- Parasyrisca andreevae Ovtsharenko, Platnick & Marusik, 1995
- Phlegra andreevae Logunov 1996
