= Bogdocosa =

Scientific classification
- Kingdom: Animalia
- Phylum: Arthropoda
- Subphylum: Chelicerata
- Class: Arachnida
- Order: Araneae
- Infraorder: Araneomorphae
- Family: Lycosidae
- Genus: Bogdocosa; Ponomarev & Belosludtsev, 2008
- Species: B. kronebergi

Binomial name
- Bogdocosa kronebergi (Andreeva, 1976)

Synonyms
- Alopecosa kronebergi Andreeva, 1976; Pardosa beijiangensis Hu & Wu, 1989; Bogdocosa baskuntchakensis Ponomarev & Belosludtsev, 2008

Genus of spiders

Bogdocosa is a genus of spiders in the family Lycosidae. It was first described in 2008 by Ponomarev & Belosludtsev. As of 2017, it contains only one species, Bogdocosa kronebergi, found in Russia, Central Asia (Kazakhstan, Uzbekistan and Tajikistan), China and Iran. The species was first described as Alopecosa kronebergi by Andreeva in 1976. In 2018, it was synonymized with two other species, including Bogdocosa baskuntchakensis.
