= Katja von der Bey =

German art historian and feminist

Katja von der Bey (born 1962 in Remscheid) is a German art historian and feminist. As managing director of the largest women's co-operative in Germany, she fights for gender equality in the economy.

== Life and achievements ==
Katja von der Bey studied art history, history and philosophy at the University of Cologne and then at the Free University in Berlin, where she has lived ever since. She completed her doctorate in the field of aesthetics and communication at the Carl-von-Ossietzky University in Oldenburg. In 2004, she completed a two-year in-service training programme to become a Fundraising Manager (FA).

Since her studies, she has focussed on feminist strategies in aesthetics. She has realised numerous art and cultural projects, including the founding of the Lu Märten Verein zur Förderung von Frauenforschung in Kunst und Kulturwissenschaft in 1987, the organisation of the 4th Women Art Historians' Conference in West Berlin in 1988 and the organisation of the exhibition Dialogues. Aesthetic Practice in Art and Science by Women in Kiel in 1991. From 1986 to 1991 she ran her own gallery for contemporary art (galerie arndtstraße) in Berlin-Kreuzberg together with Burkhard Sülzen. In the 1990s, she curated exhibitions and international appearances by the sound performance group "Audio Ballerinas". Katja von der Bey has been an honorary board member of Kunstpflug e.V. since 1995 and was a member of the executive committee of the New Society for Visual Arts (NGBK) Berlin. She has been involved in the Sing-Akademie zu Berlin since 2014 and has been a board member of the foundation of the same name since 2017.

In 1994, von der Bey was elected to the supervisory board of WeiberWirtschaft eG, moved to the board in 1996 and took over the management after completing her doctorate. Since 2006, she has been the Berlin regional manager of the bundesweite gründerinnenagentur (bga). As managing director of WeiberWirtschaft eG, she was involved in the establishment and consolidation of the organisation, in the development and implementation of the sister organisation Gründerinnenzentrale - Navigation in die Selbständigkeit as well as in the establishment of the in-house microcredit programme, which WeiberWirtschaft offers its members in cooperation with the association Goldrausch. It is also responsible for the reference work FrauenUNTERNEHMEN-Berlin. With WeiberWirtschaft, she fights for gender equality in the economy, for which she was awarded the Berlin Women's Prize in 2013 and the Order of Merit of the State of Berlin in 2017.

== Publications ==
- „Nationale Codierung abstrakter Malerei“, Katja von der Bey, 1997
- „Hilla von Rebay. Die Erfinderin des Guggenheim Museums“, Katja von der Bey, Edition Braus, 19. Juli 2013 ISBN 978-3-86228-051-3
- „Unsere Luftschlösser haben U-Bahn-Anschluss“, Claudia Neusüß und Katja von der Bey, Berlin Januar 2015, ISBN 978-3-00-048173-4
- „Innovationen vom Tellerrand: Die Rolle von Unternehmensgründerinnen in der Ökonomie nachhaltigen Wirtschaftens“, Ulrike Röhr und Katja von der Bey, S. 125–136 in „CSR und Kleinstunternehmen. Die Basis bewegt sich!“ Springer Verlag, 2017, ISBN 978-3-662-53627-8
