= Katja Sebald =

Katja Sebald (born in Regensburg) is a German art historian, author, journalist, curator and translator.

== Life ==
As a cultural journalist, Sebald writes in and about the Five Lakes Region, including for the ‘’Süddeutsche Zeitung‘’. Sebald devotes her book projects to the history of her hometown Regensburg, her temporary home in Chiemgau, the city of Munich, and Italy. As a state-certified translator for Italian, she studied art history, Bavarian church history, modern German literature, and Italian philology at LMU Munich. Her master's thesis dealt with Jenny Holzer's memorial to Oskar Maria Graf in the Literaturhaus München. Sebald's writing style combines contemporary art, literature, and Bavarian cultural history.

In addition to books, specialist texts, reviews, and other journalistic formats, she also writes “functional texts” about art: press releases, advertising copy, and catalog texts. She supports artists with their exhibition projects, gives opening speeches, and conducts artist talks at vernissages. Sebald's press work accompanies various art and cultural projects within the Fünfseenland region.

== Publications (selection) ==
- 2010: Sommerfrische am Starnberger See – Eine Kulturkreuzfahrt in zwölf Stationen Hörbuch mit Christian Tramitz, Volk Verlag, ISBN 978-3-86222-018-2
- 2011: Ertrinken… Versinken – Auf den Spuren von König Ludwig II. am Starnberger See Hörbuch mit Carin C. Tietze und Josef Brustmann, Volk Verlag, ISBN 978-3-86222-056-4
- 2012: Regensburg im 13. Jahrhundert (Band 4 der Reihe „Das Bayerische Jahrtausend“), Volk Verlag, ISBN 978-3-86222-066-3
- 2014: Unbekannter Chiemgau: Von Millibauern, Madonnen und Marzipan, Volk Verlag, ISBN 978-3-86222-060-1
- 2015: Das München-Album: Zwischen Wirtschaftswunder und Studentenrevolte, Volk Verlag, ISBN 978-3-86222-158-5
- 2016: Unbekanntes Fünfseenland, Volk Verlag, ISBN 978-3-86222-210-0
- 2018: Mein bester Spezi ist der Kramerfeichtmartl gewesen, Allitera Verlag, ISBN 978-3-96233-037-8
- 2021: Sehnsucht Starnberger See – Villen und ihre berühmten Bewohner im Portrait, Allitera Verlag, ISBN 978-3-96233-216-7
- 2024: Künstler Innen Häuser Außen – 30 Häuser von Künstlerinnen und Künstlern in Oberbayern, Allitera Verlag, ISBN 978-3-96233-431-4

== Awards ==
- 2022: Recognition Award from the District of Starnberg
- 2024: Germany's most beautiful regional book Award
