= Katya (spider) =

Scientific classification
- Kingdom: Animalia
- Phylum: Arthropoda
- Subphylum: Chelicerata
- Class: Arachnida
- Order: Araneae
- Infraorder: Araneomorphae
- Family: Salticidae
- Subfamily: Salticinae
- Genus: Katya; Prószyński & Deeleman-Reinhold, 2010

Type species
- K. florescens Prószyński & Deeleman-Reinhold, 2010

Species
- K. florescens Prószyński & Deeleman-Reinhold, 2010 — Indonesia (Flores); K. ijensis Prószyński & Deeleman-Reinhold, 2010 — Indonesia (Java); K. inornata Prószyński & Deeleman-Reinhold, 2010 — Indonesia (Java)

Genus of spiders

Katya is a genus of Southeast Asian jumping spiders first described by Jerzy Prószyński & Christa Deeleman-Reinhold in 2010. As of April 2019 it contains only three species. This genus is named after the Uzbek arachnologist Ekaterina Andreeva.
