= F.S.K. =

German band

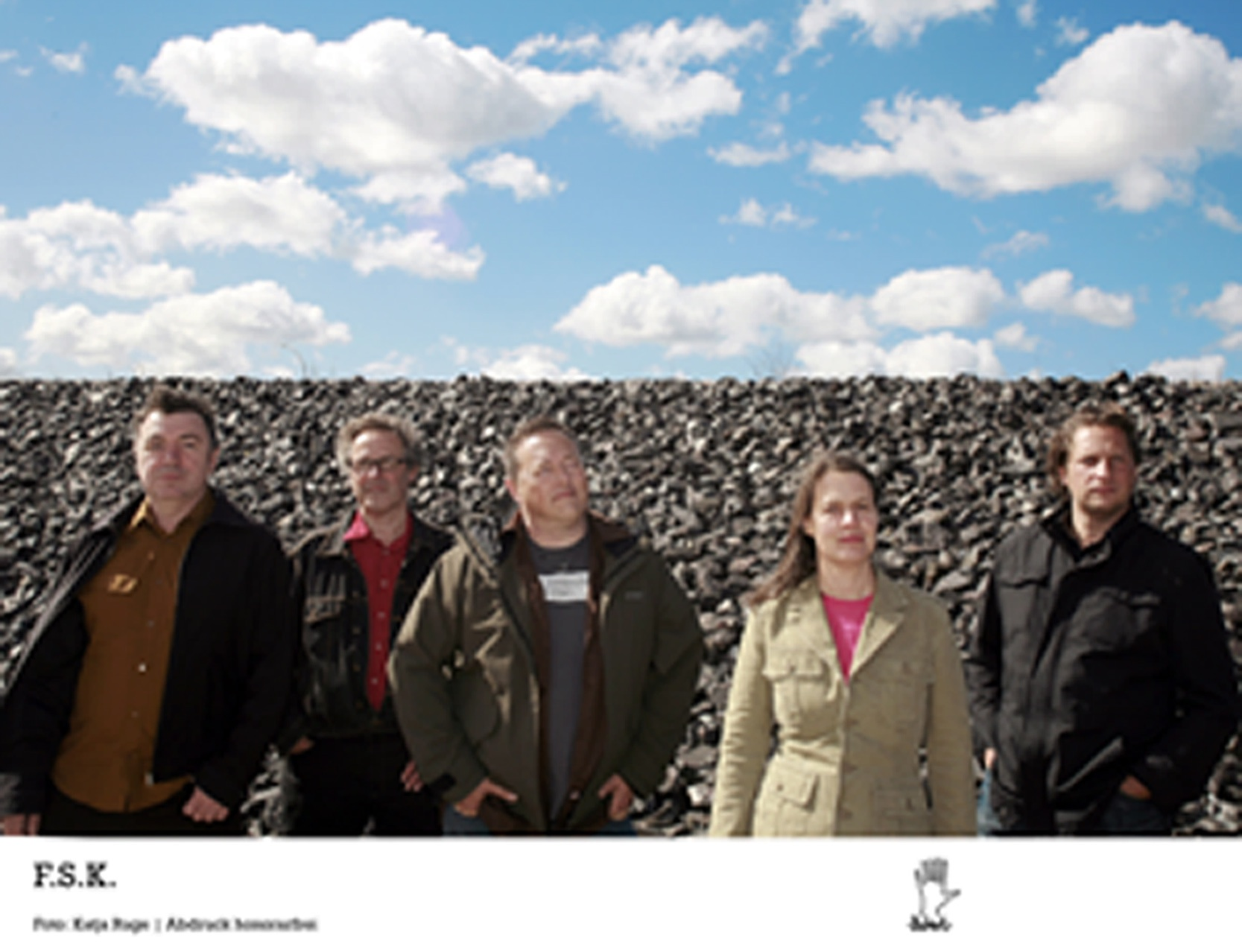

F.S.K. (Freiwillige Selbstkontrolle, German meaning "voluntary self control") is a German band that formed in Munich in 1980. The band has been associated with avant-garde fringes of Neue Deutsche Welle (German New Wave) of the early 1980s and with techno and house music since the mid 1990s.

== History ==
The band was formed in Munich in 1980 by Wilfred Petzi, Thomas Meinecke, Justin Hoffman and Michaela Melian, contributors to the underground magazine Mode & Verzweiflung (Fashion & despair). The band name is a reference to the German motion picture rating organisation Freiwillige Selbstkontrolle der Filmwirtschaft, which uses the same acronym. From 1985 the band was championed by British disc jockey John Peel, recording six sessions for his BBC radio show, and were themselves strongly influenced by the independent British music scene of the time, such as by the unusual interpretation of country music by the Mekons. FSK records were released on Zickzack, a record label owned by German music journalist and punk rock advocate Alfred Hilsberg. F.S.K. frequently played with David Lowery of Camper Van Beethoven and Cracker and recorded in his studio in Richmond, Virginia. In the mid-1990s the band recorded Techno and House music, recording in Uphon Studios in Weilheim, Bavaria. On their album First Take Then Shake they worked with Detroit producer Anthony Shake Shakir.

The band members are active in the arts, Thomas Meinecke as a successful novelist, Michaela Melián as a professor at the University of Fine Arts of Hamburg, Justin Hoffmann as director of the Wolfsburg Art Society and Wilfried Petzi as a photographer.

== Lineup ==
- Wilfred Petzi - trombone, guitar, vocals, percussion
- Thomas Meinecke - concertina, guitar, vocals, percussion
- Justin Hoffmann - electric piano, guitar, xylophone, vocals
- Michaela Melian - bass, melodica, vocals
- Carl Oesterheld - drums, percussion (joined in 1990)
- David Lowery and Johnny Hickman (vocals, guitars) of the American band Cracker frequently collaborated with F.S.K. from 1990-1995 and were occasionally listed as full members.

== Discography ==
as Freiwillige Selbstkontrolle:

- Freiwillige Selbstkontrolle [Herz aus Stein], 1980, ZickZack ZZ 6 (7-inch EP)
- Teilnehmende Beobachtung, 1981, ZickZack ZZ 27 (7-inch EP)
- Stürmer, 1981, ZickZack ZZ 80 (12-inch LP)
- Magic Moments, 1983, ZickZack ZZ 155 (12-inch EP)
- Ça c’est le Blues, 1984, ZickZack ZZ 2001 (12-inch LP)
- Goes Underground, 1985, ZickZack ZZ 1789 (12-inch LP)
- Last Orders (The John Peel Session), 1985, ZickZack ZZ 1066 (12-inch EP)
- Continental Breakfast, 1987, ZickZack ZZ 2532 / Ediesta CALC LP 16 (12-inch LP) [Sampler 1983–1985]
- American Sector, 1987, Ediesta CALC 32 (12-inch EP)
- In Dixieland, 1987, ZickZack ZZ 1987 / Ediesta CALC LP 042 (12-inch LP / CD) [CD contains Magic Moments EP]

as F.S.K.:

- Double Peel Sessions, 1989, Strange Fruit Records SFPMA204 (12-inch LP / CD)
- Original Gasman Band, 1989, ZickZack ZZ 8000 (12-inch LP / CD) [CD contains American Sector EP]
- Budweiser Polka / Cannonball Yodel, 1990, Sub Up Records (7-inch single)
- Son Of Kraut, 1991, Sub Up Records SUBLP 12 (12-inch LP / CD) [in some discographies erroneously referred to as Richmond (VA) where it was recorded]
- The Sound Of Music, 1993, Sub Up Records subup25 (12-inch LP / CD)
- The German-American Octet, 1994, Return To Sender (Normal Records) RTS 8 (CD)
- Bei Alfred, 1995, ZickZack ZZ 1995 (2×CD) [Sampler 1980 - 1989]
- International, 1996, Sub Up Records subup28 (2×12″ LP / CD)
- 4 Instrumentals, 1997, Disko B 64 (12-inch EP)
- Tel Aviv, 1998, Sub Up Records subup31 (12-inch LP / CD)
- Did You See Davidopoulos Hit That Ball (F.S.K.) / Landla (HP Falkner & Cpt. Schneider), 1999, private pressing (7-inch single)
- X, 2000, Sub Up Records subup34 (12-inch LP / CD)
- First Take Then Shake, 2004, Disko B db123 (12-inch LP + 7-inch single / CD)
- Freiwillige Selbstkontrolle, 2008, Buback BTT 95 (12-inch LP / CD)
- Freiwillige Selbstkontrolle ist ein Mode & Verzweiflung Produkt, 2011, Disko B (3×CD) [Sampler 1980–2009]
- Akt, eine Treppe hinabsteigend, 2012, Buback BTT 118 (12-inch LP + CD)
- Ein Haufen Scheiß und ein Zertrümmertes Klavier, 2017, Martin Hossbach (12-inch LP)
- Freiwillige Selbstkontrolle/Teilnehmende Beobachtung, 2021, A-Musik (12-inch LP) [Sampler 1980–1981]

=== Compilations ===
- 2006 – "Silver Monk Time - a Tribute to the Monks" (29 bands cover the Monks) label play loud! productions
