= Katya Soldak =

Ukrainian–American journalist

- Катя Солдак
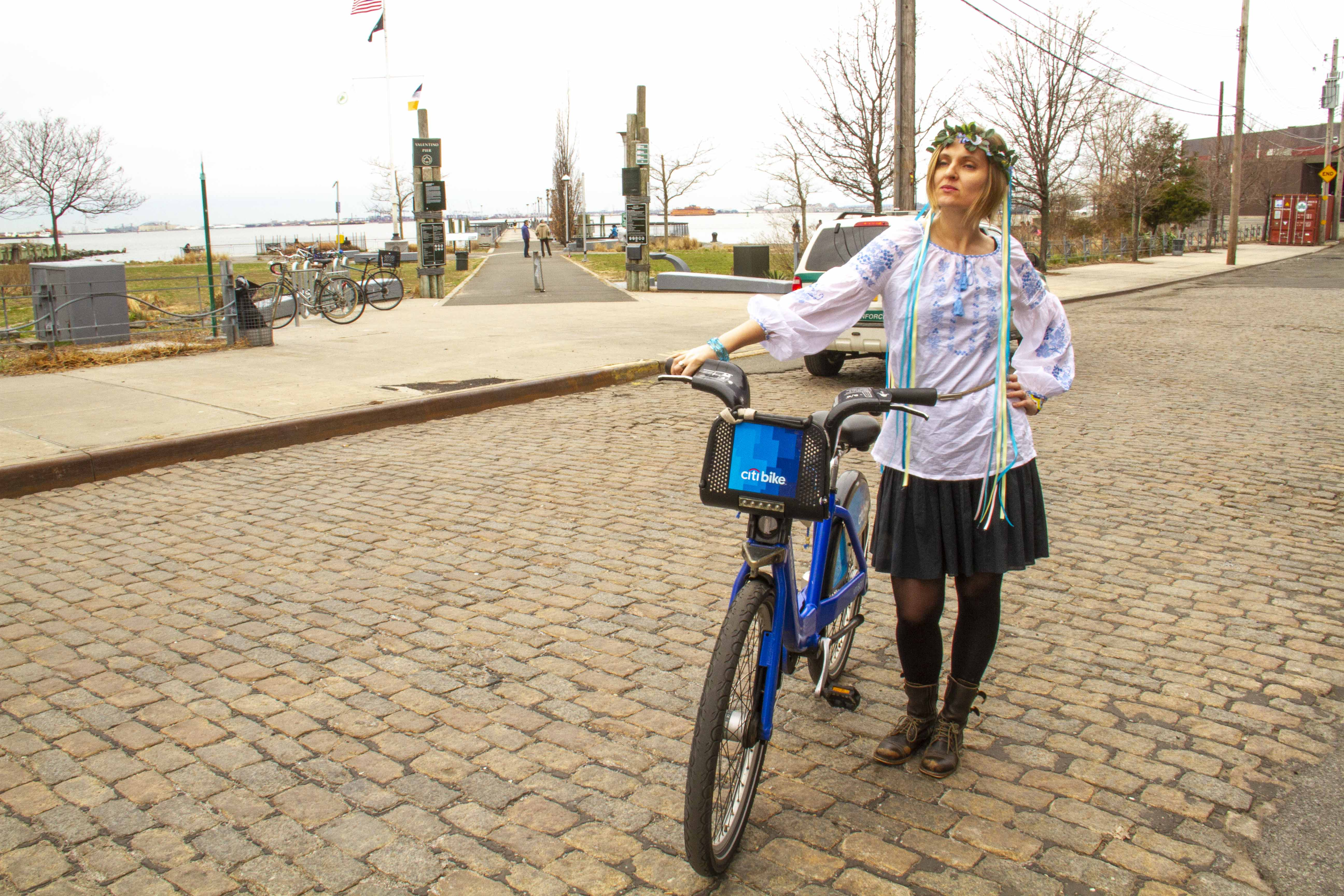
- Soldak in 2016
- Born: Katia Soldak; Kharkiv, Ukrainian SSR, Soviet Union (now Ukraine)
- Education: Columbia University Graduate School of Journalism
- Occupations: Author, journalist, documentary filmmaker
- Employer: Forbes
- Known for: Eastern Europe-focussed journalism
- Notable work: The Long Breakup (documentary); This Is How Propaganda Works (memoir-essay)

Katya Soldak (Note: Ukrainian: Катя Солдак, romanized: Katia Soldak) (born in Kharkiv) is a New-York-based journalist, documentary filmmaker, and author of Ukrainian origin. She is currently the editorial director for Forbes Media's international editions, focussing on Eastern Europe and the post-Soviet territories.

== Early life and education ==
Soldak was born and raised in Kharkiv, Ukraine. While attending H.S. Skovoroda Kharkiv National Pedagogical University Soldak worked for one of the first independent TV stations in Ukraine in the 90s. From 2001 to 2003, Katya Soldak studied at Emerson College. In 2008, she graduated from Columbia University Graduate School of Journalism with a Master's degree in digital media.

== Career ==
After graduation, Soldak began work as a journalist, covering issues related to Eastern Europe. Soldak worked for CBS News and various production houses in New York City, before she started her career at Forbes Media. There she holds the position of an editorial director of Forbes Media's international editions, with the focus of Eastern Europe and anything related to Post-Soviet states. Her work is also seen in NewsBreak, Forbes Argentina, BEAMSTART, and Forbes Ecuador.

She is the author of the memoir-essay "This Is How Propaganda Works", which chronicles her experiences growing up in the Soviet Union. The essay was released on December 20, 2017.

Soldak directed the in 2020 released documentary The Long Breakup. Since Russia started all-out war on Ukraine on February 24, 2022, the film developed an international following with dozens of film screenings often accompanied by discussions and fundraisers for Ukraine in North America and Europe. The film has been a subject of screenings in universities and human rights organizations, prompting discussions about Ukraine, Russian war crimes in Ukraine and Russian propaganda internationally. A number of European TV channels aired "The Long Breakup" translated into local languages, such as French, German, Spanish, Greek, Dutch, Polish, Russian, and Hebrew.

In 2021 Soldak created podcast series From Socialism to Capitalism about life in the 1990s in the former Soviet Bloc countries.

Since the escalation of the Russian invasion of Ukraine in 2022, she's been covering the news in Ukraine daily. Soldak frequently speaks publicly about the war in Ukraine, Ukrainian identity, media and importance of Ukrainian perspective in covering news.

During the 2022 World Economic Forum in Davos Soldak moderated a panel Defending Freedom From The Frontlines with Ukrainians remotely connecting from the battlefield, for Ukraine House Davos. The panel featured Maryna Babchynitser, the Correspondent Officer of the Operational Battalion of the National Guard of Ukraine; Yehor Cherniev, Malcolm Nance, and Oleh Sentsov. During the 2023 World Economic Forum Soldak moderated a panel at Ukraine House Davos titled "Defending Our Freedom: Ukrainian Bravery on the Frontline, which featured lawyers Yegor Firsov and Masi Nayyem, Yulia Paevska (Taira), and Illia Samoilenko (Gandalf)

On March 3, Soldak took part in the Night of Ideas in New York speaking on Ukrainian identity and covering the war.

== Personal life ==
Soldak lives and works in New York City with her children.

== Bibliography ==
- Soldak, Katya (2013). FROM OLIGARCH TO PRESIDENT?: Mikhail Prokhorov is a tycoon in Russia, Jay-Z's partner in Brooklyn-and a strong candidate to eventually replace Vladimir Putin in the Kremlin, a prospect the billionaire is turning into his full-time job. FORBES. ISSN 0015-6914. OCLC 830786147.
- Soldak, Katya (2014). OLIGARCH IN THE MIDDLE As Russian troops roll in, Ukraine's second-richest man, Victor Pinchuk, must choose between his head and his heart. FORBES. ISSN 0015-6914. OCLC 5562078782.
