= Luzifer (restaurant chain) =

German restaurant chain

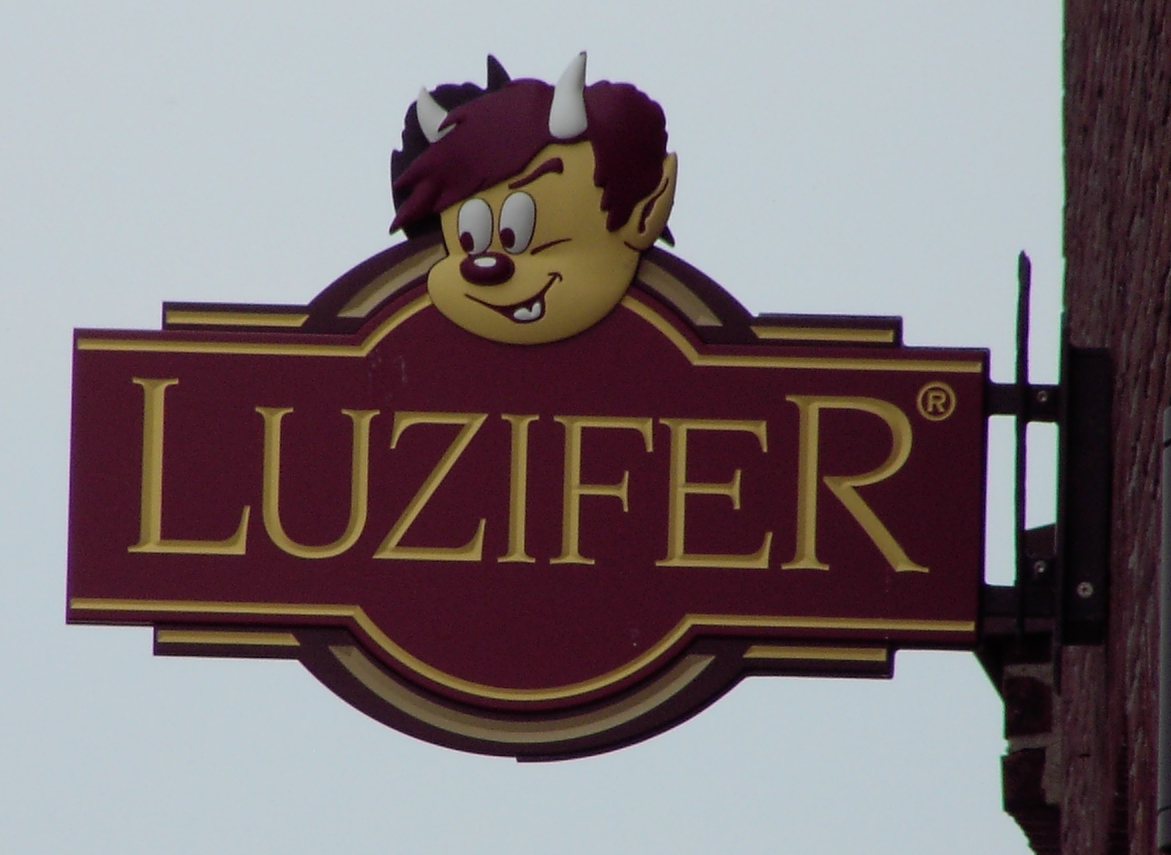
Sign with logo of restaurant chain "Luzifer" in Eckernförde 2011

Luzifer is a German restaurant chain with seven locations in northern Germany.

Since the first Luzifer was founded in 1999, its food service concept has been based on all-day menus for all ages.

All restaurants have a uniform interior designed with the same colors and dark wood furniture, and use large open dining rooms and open kitchens. All restaurants offer a weekly changing lunch menu, themed buffets, and seasonal foods. All meals are prepared in front of diners in the open kitchens. Home-made products like roasted coffee, cakes, and waffles are used to strengthen Luzifer's customer brand loyalty. Locations are chosen as close to the sea as possible. The restaurant in Hamburg is, exceptionally, located in a shopping center, because of the high frequency of walk-in customers. Also important are many outdoor seats.

== Locations ==
- Sylt (since 1999)
- Kiel (since 2002)
- Lübeck-Travemünde (since 2005)
- Eckernförde (since 2008)
- Schleswig (since 2010)
- Butjadingen (since 2010)

A location in Hamburg existed between 2004 and some time after 2011.
