= Ludwigsthal (Lindberg) =

- Ortsteil of Lindberg
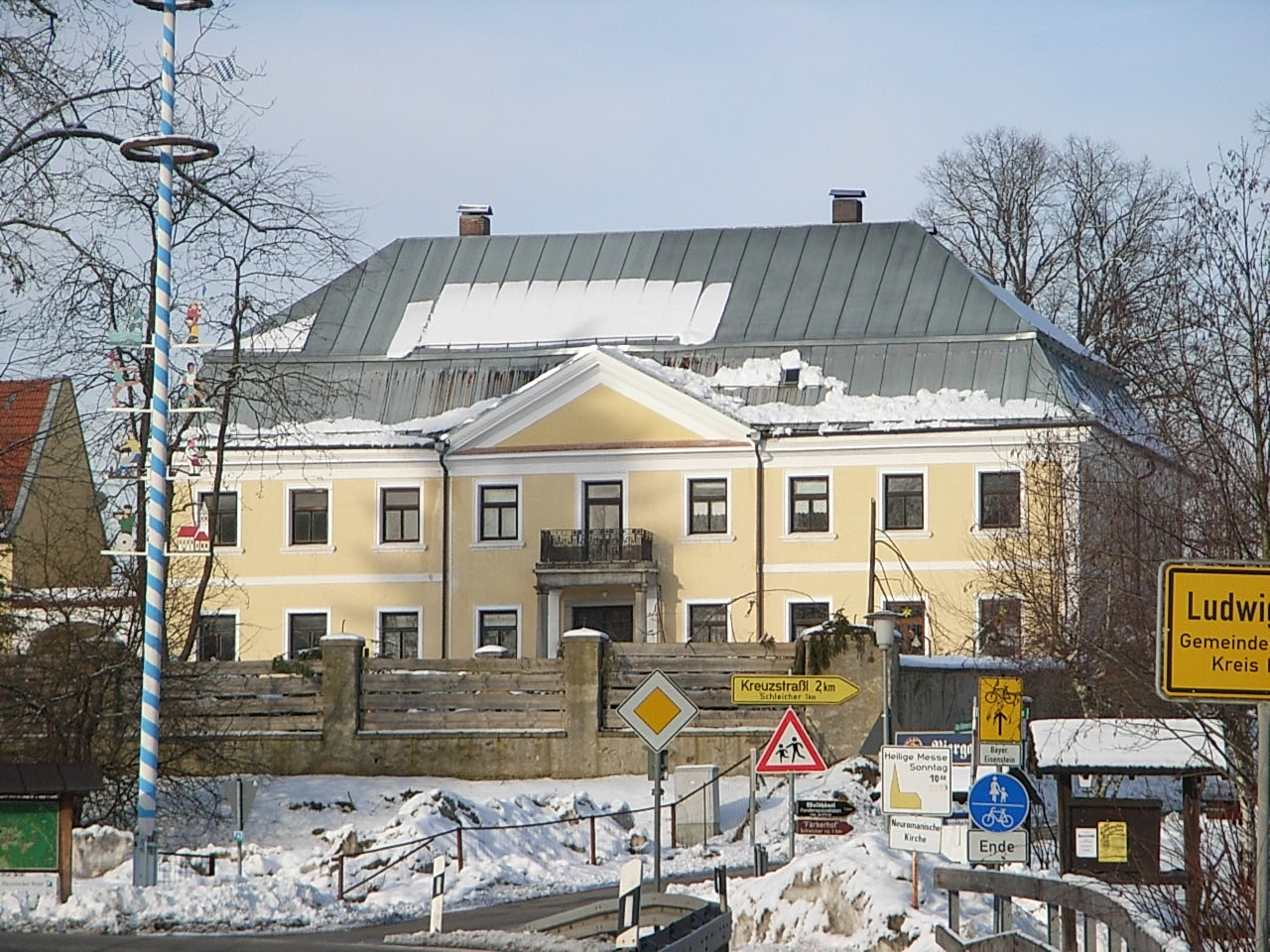
- Schloss Ludwigsthal
- Interactive map of Ludwigsthal
- Location within Germany Location within Bavaria
- Coordinates: 49°3′24″N 13°14′10″E
- Country: Germany
- State: Bavaria
- Municipality: Lindberg
- Elevation: 611 m (2,005 ft)
- Time zone: UTC+01:00 (CET)
  - Summer (DST): UTC+02:00 (CEST)
- Postal codes: 94227
- Dialling codes: 09922

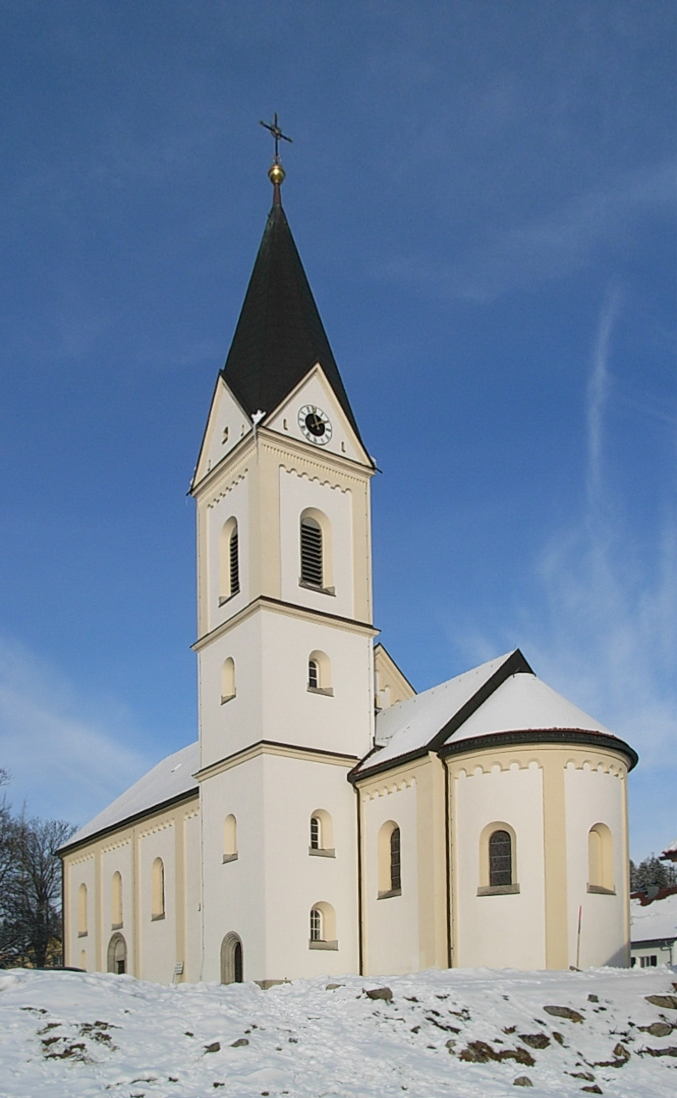
the parish church of the Sacred Heart of Jesus

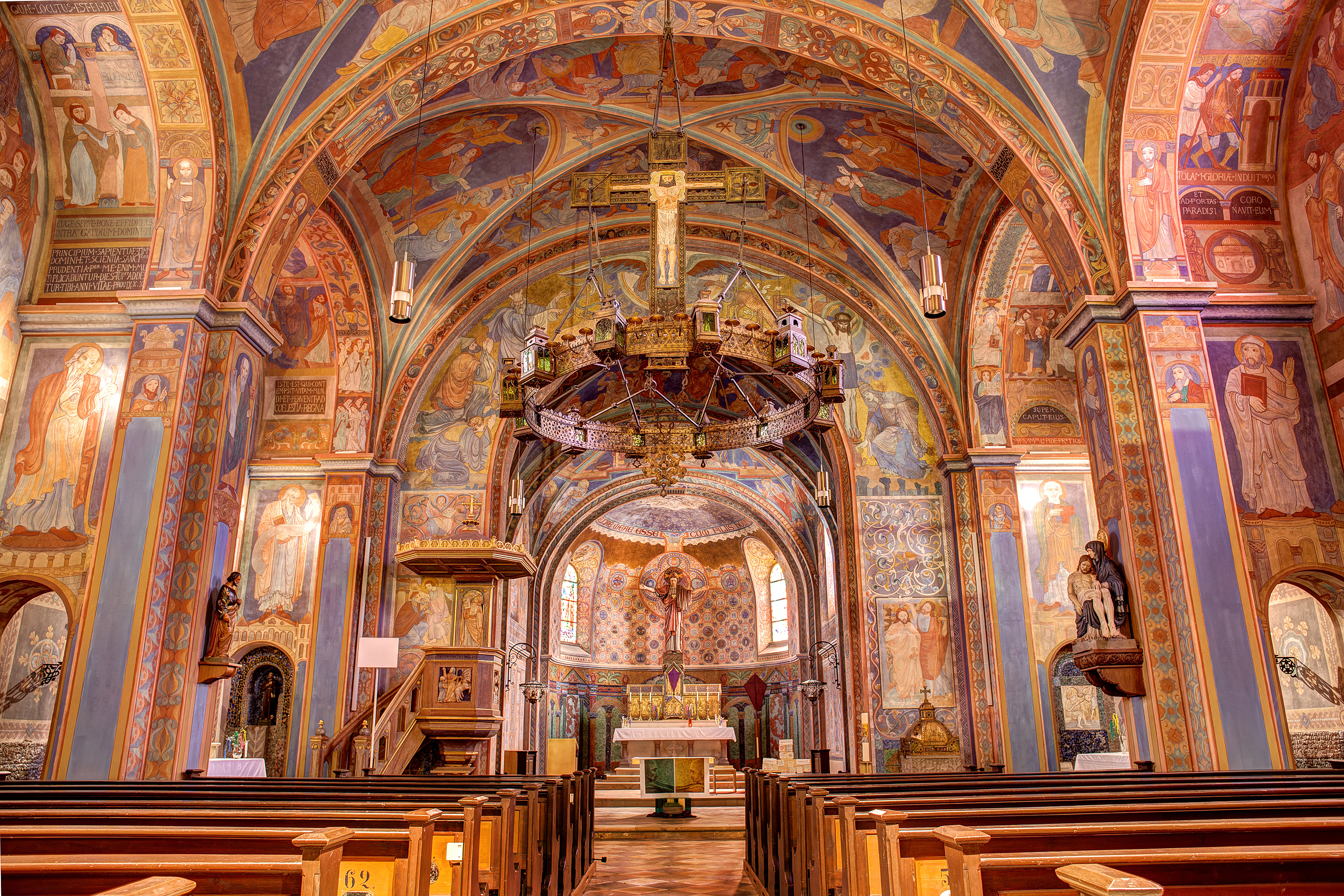
Church of the Sacred Heart, Ludwigsthal (interior)

Ludwigsthal is a village in the municipality of Lindberg in the Lower Bavarian district of Regen.

== Location ==
Ludwigsthal lies on the B 11 federal highway between Zwiesel and Bayerisch Eisenstein. It also has a halt on the Bavarian Forest Railway.

== History ==
In 1826 master glassworker, Georg Christoph Abele from Neuhurkenthal, founded a glassworks in the Bohemian Forest and named it one year later after King Ludwig I of Bavaria. In 1830, Abele had a mansion built by the royal architect and building foreman, Lexa, to plans drawn up by Prague master builder, von Zobel. From 1828 to 1848, white, then green, mirror glass was produced at the factory. In March 1860, all the property was auctioned off due to insolvency. It was sold for 44,000 guilders to butcher, Josef Pauli, and brewer, Josef Kammermeier, both from Zwiesel.

At the end of the 19th century, the company switched to bottle glass manufacture. The glassworks, which still employed about 200 people after the Second World War, was closed in 1981. At the beginning of 2006, the empty building collapsed under masses of snow. The mansion of the glassworks owners, which was leased by the association Pro National Park in January 2008, and the glassmakers' houses are still standing. The firm of Krystallglasmanufaktur Ludwigsthal has continued the tradition of glass art in Ludwigsthal since 2001 with demonstration glassworks.

On 1 June 1876, Prince Otto arrived at the mansion house to spend several weeks in Ludwigsthal. On the advice of his doctors, he often walked in the forest, and his favorite path along the Regen to Regenhütte still bears the name Prinzensteig or "Prince's Trail".

The chapelry of Ludwigsthal was established in 1894; this was followed in 1912 by its elevation to a parish.

Near Ludwigsthal there is the information centre, "Haus zur Wildnis", of the Bavarian Forest National Park and an animal enclosure covering 65 hectares.

In 1950, the Ludwigsthal Dog Sports Association was founded, in 1977, Ludwigsthal Tennis Club and, in 1981, the Ludwigsthal Fishing Club. In 1989 the parish of Ludwigsthal counted 947 Catholics.

The old railway station building at Ludwigsthal station, 1.5 kilometres from the village, is now privately owned and not open to the public. One kilometre closer to the village - directly next to the National Park Visitor Centre - a new Ludwigsthal halt was established in 2003.

== Sights ==
The Neo-Romanesque parish church of the Sacred Heart built in 1893/94 to plans by Johann Baptist Schott. It has a unique Neo-Romanesque décor by Munich artist, Franz Xaver Hofstötter (1871–1913). An unusual feature is the rich painting of the interior rooms.

In the vicinity of Ludwigsthal is the information centre of Haus zur Wildnis ("House of the Wilderness") which belongs to the Bavarian Forest National Park and was built in 2006. There is also a 65-hectare animal enclosure in which a covered wooden observation tower stands.

== Clubs ==
- TSV Ludwigsthal (tennis)
- Freiwillige Feuerwehr Ludwigsthal (volunteer fire brigade)
- Fischereiverein Ludwigsthal (fishing)
- Schützenverein Ludwigsthal (shooting)
- ESV Zwiesel am Bahnhof Ludwigsthal
