= Lichtfest Leipzig =

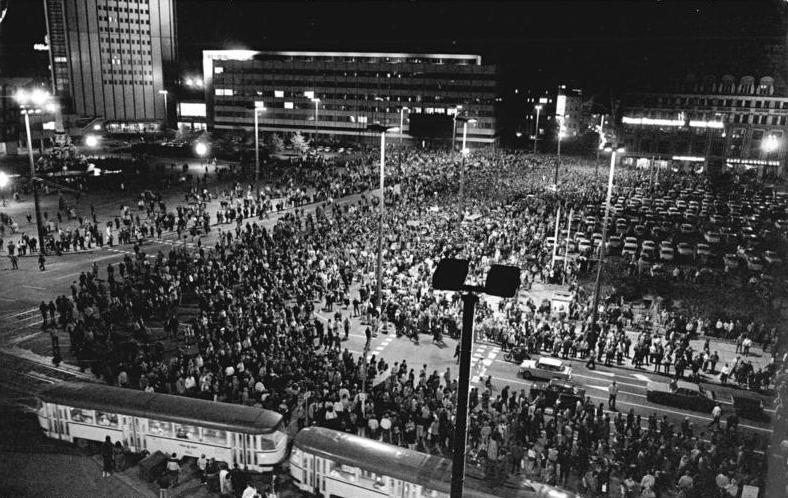
Monday demonstration in Leipzig in October 1989 on Augustusplatz, which was then called Karl-Marx-Platz

Lichtfest Leipzig ('Leipzig Festival of Lights') is an event that has been held in Leipzig since 2009 to commemorate the Monday demonstrations in East Germany on October 9, 1989. The venue is Augustusplatz or the Innenstadtring (2009, 2014, 2019).

Since then, the festival has been organized annually by Leipzig Tourismus und Marketing (LTM) GmbH, the City of Leipzig, and the Initiative Herbst '89. Since 2019, the advisory board "Kuratorium Tag der Friedlichen Revolution 1989" (Board of Trustees for the Day of the Peaceful Revolution 1989) has been responsible for setting the theme and organizing the accompanying program.

The art and civic project has received several national and international awards and is designed each year by different artists. In addition, the Leipzig Festival of Lights is characterized by a strong national exchange, particularly through Leipzig's various city partnerships.

The 2009 event marking 20 years of the Peaceful Revolution was attended by 150,000 people. On October 9, 2014, the 25th anniversary of the Peaceful Revolution, around 200,000 people commemorated the historic events of autumn 1989. On the 30th anniversary in 2019, only 75,000 people gathered around Leipzig's inner city ring road to commemorate the Peaceful Revolution.
