= Genius Loci Weimar =

German art festival

Genius Loci Weimar is a three-day festival for audiovisual art, video mapping and facade projections, which takes place annually at various locations in the cultural city of Weimar, Germany. The festival was launched in 2012 by festival founder Hendrik Wendler.

== Festival ==
Artists from various disciplines, such as video art, new media art, architecture, animation and music, participate in the festival. In the run-up to the festival, an international competition is announced in which artists can submit their works. During the festival weekend, up to three building facades in Weimar will be used to display the video projects selected in the competition. From dusk until midnight, the artists will project their contributions, which are limited to a maximum of fifteen minutes, onto selected buildings in the city center. In addition to the main projections, other audiovisual installations, known as side acts, will also be presented on the festival grounds.

Among the most famous buildings to date are the Goethe and Schiller Archive, the German National Theater and State Orchestra Weimar, the German National Theater (DNT), the Anna Amalia Library, the former Gauforum, and the City Palace, the Bastille, the new Bauhaus Museum and the Buchenwald memorial.

Each year, the festival is dedicated to a theme that combines the Genius Loci of the venue with current social issues. In 2025, the theme will be Goethe's Faust.

The festival is one of the events of the Weimar Summer and is organized and produced by MXPerience gUG (limited liability). Since 2012, more than 50,000 visitors have attended the interdisciplinary festival each year.

== Competition ==
As part of the annual competition, artists from all over the world are invited to submit their conceptual ideas for the Genius Loci Weimar Festival. The three best artistic works will be awarded a total of €35,000 in prize money and presented at the festival in Weimar.

Each year, up to three artistically challenging and historically relevant building facades in the city of Weimar are selected for the competition. The competition seeks concepts that capture the spirit of the place by combining natural conditions with human creativity.

The special requirements for the artistic works are to develop an independent visual language and not to lose themselves in historical retelling or clichéd sensationalism. The focus is on the “Genius Loci”, the spirit of the place, which is to be made visible with new media art techniques, thus adding another level of meaning to the place itself.

To participate, artists must submit their works in the form of a 30-second video clip. All competition entries will then be shown in a public traveling exhibition in Weimar. The three best works will be determined by a public vote on the website and by a jury of experts.
