= Luminale =

Light festival in Frankfurt am Main, Germany

The Luminale is a festival of light culture that has been held every two years in Frankfurt am Main since 2000. It is always held in parallel with Light + Building, an international trade fair for lighting and lighting technology. During the festival, light artworks and light installations can be seen on public and private buildings as well as at prominent locations in and around Frankfurt. The skyline with the city's skyscrapers is also included.

== History ==
The Festival of Lights is organized by Messe Frankfurt, among others. For the fourth Luminale in April 2008, cities and regions outside the Rhine-Main area took part for the first time, including Aschaffenburg and the Middle Rhine valley. In 2008, there were a total of around 220 light installations and over 180 events, which were visited by more than 100,000 people.

The fifth Luminale took place from April 11 to 16, 2010, at 157 venues between Mainz, Wiesbaden, and Aschaffenburg, and the sixth, with around 170 productions, took place from April 15 to 20, 2012. According to the organizer, there were more than 140,000 visitors. The seventh Luminale took place from March 30 to April 4, 2014. The eighth Luminale was held from March 13 to 18, 2016, and according to the organizers, around 180,000 people attended. In June 2017, the Luminale e.V. association was founded as a non-profit organization to promote and organize the Luminale. The ninth Luminale took place from March 18 to 23, 2018, with a new concept as a “biennial for light art and urban design.”

- The tenth Luminale was scheduled to take place from March 12 to 15, 2020. However, due to the COVID-19 pandemic, it was canceled on March 12.
- The next Luminale was supposed to take place in 2022 – but Luminale 2022 and 2024 have been canceled.
