= Katja Mragowska =

Polish-German artist based in Stuttgart (born 1975)

- Born: 1975 (age 50–51)
- Occupation: Artist
- Known for: Sculpture

Katja Mragowska (born 1975) is a Polish-German artist based in Stuttgart.

== Art career ==
She is self-taught and motivated by the fragile beauty of the human form. Mragowska has produced life-size metal and resin cast sculptures which she calls abstractions of the figure.

Mragowska is currently in residence at Newcastle University in England. A recent work is a piece entitled Against Capitalism and Materialism or Bad Primark which depicts a six-foot androgynous figure obscured by layers of fabric and an excess of accessories. Her goal with this piece was to show how identity is sold to us, and how we are reduced to consumers whose real identities are lost or hidden behind the "stuff".

== Exhibitions ==
Mragowska has exhibited at Stuttgart Paladium, Das Whorl, Stuttgart KunstCenter, The Poznan Institute of Contemporary Art and The Federation Gallery, Mexico. She has won awards including the Oleszczyński Prize for new Polish sculpture (2006) and the Bachhuber Prize (2007).

Mragowska's main body of work is held in The Poznan Institute of Contemporary Art.
