= Süddeutsche Zeitung =

German newspaper published in Munich

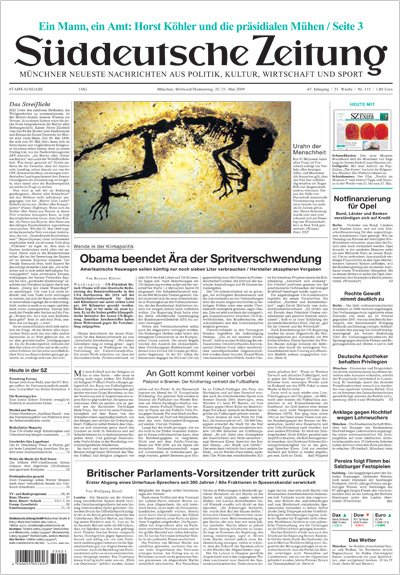
- The 20 May 2009 front page
- Type: Daily newspaper
- Format: Nordisch
- Owner: Südwestdeutsche Medien Holding
- Editor: Judith Wittwer
- Founded: 6 October 1945
- Political alignment: Progressive-liberalism; Centre-left
- Headquarters: Munich, Bavaria, Germany
- Circulation: 320,159 (Print, 2020); 90,998 (Digital, 2020)
- ISSN: 0174-4917
- Website: www.sueddeutsche.de

The Süddeutsche Zeitung (pronounced [ˈzyːtˌdɔʏtʃə ˈtsaɪtʊŋ]; lit. 'South German Newspaper'), published in Munich, Bavaria, is one of the largest and most influential daily newspapers in Germany. The tone of SZ is mainly described as centre-left, liberal, social-liberal, progressive-liberal, and social-democrat. It is considered one of Germany's newspapers of record.

The Süddeutsche Zeitung was one of the first daily newspapers approved by the Allies after World War II and was first published on 6 October 1945.

The newspaper is published by Süddeutsche Verlag in Munich. It is majority owned by investment holdings and a small part by the original publishing family, the Friedmann family.

The editors-in-chief are Wolfgang Krach and Judith Wittwer. The chairman of the editorial board is Thomas Schaub.

== History ==
=== 20th century ===
On 6 October 1945, five months after the end of World War II in Germany, the SZ was the first newspaper to receive a license from the U.S. military administration of Bavaria. The first issue was published the same evening, reportedly printed from the same presses that had printed Mein Kampf.

Bernard B. McMahon, commander of the US intelligence control system, had previously been looking for a long time for non-Nazi ("untainted") licensees for a new German daily newspaper. He found them in the publishers August Schwingenstein, Edmund Goldschagg, and Franz Josef Schöningh. Each had pre-Nazi journalism experience, Goldschagg had been arrested by the Gestapo, and Schwingenstein had been a member of the Reichsbanner Schwarz-Rot-Gold. The founders announced that Süddeutsche Zeitung would be "a mouthpiece for all Germans who are united in their love of freedom, in their hatred of the totalitarian state, in their abhorrence of everything that is National Socialist".

The most important competitor is the more conservative Frankfurter Allgemeine Zeitung (FAZ)., founded in 1949.

=== 21st century ===
Declines in advertising in the early 2000s were so severe that the paper was on the brink of bankruptcy in October 2002. The Süddeutsche survived through a 150 million euro investment by a new shareholder, a regional newspaper chain called Südwestdeutsche Medien. Over three years, the newspaper underwent a reduction in its staff, from 425 to 307, the closing of a regional edition in Düsseldorf, and the scrapping of a section devoted to news from Berlin.

In spring 2004, SZ launched the Süddeutsche Bibliothek. Each week, one of 50 famous novels of the 20th century was made available in hardcover at certain newsstands and in book shops. Later a series of 50 influential movies on DVD followed. In late 2004, the daily also launched a popular science magazine, SZ Wissen. In late 2005, a series of children's books continued this branch of special editions.

In early 2015, the newspaper received a 2.6-terabyte dataset from an anonymous source. The dataset contained confidential information of a law firm offering the management of offshore companies. The newspaper in conjunction with the International Consortium of Investigative Journalists reviewed the data from the Panama Papers for over a year before publishing stories from it on 3 April 2016.

In late 2017, the newspaper released snippets from a 1.4-terabyte dataset to be known as the "Paradise Papers" containing about 13.4 million documents, throwing light on the financial offshore jurisdictions, whose workings are unveiled, including Bermuda, the headquarters of the main company involved, Appleby, corporate services provider Estera, corporate registries in the Caribbean and Singapore-based international trust and corporate services provider, Asiaciti Trust. It contains the names of more than 120,000 people and companies. The newspaper called in the International Consortium of Investigative Journalists to oversee the investigation. BBC Panorama and The Guardian were among the nearly 100 media groups investigating the papers. The leaked data covers seven decades, from 1950 to 2016.

In May 2018, the German Press Council opened an inquiry to determine whether a Süddeutsche Zeitung cartoon which depicted Israeli Prime Minister Benjamin Netanyahu was antisemitic; readers had complained that the image "reminded them of the anti-Semitic language of Nazi times". Süddeutsche Zeitung ended its decades-long collaboration with the cartoonist and apologized to readers, calling the cartoon a mistake.

In August 2025, Süddeutsche Zeitung published an article questioning the authenticity of photographs of starving Palestinians in the Gaza Strip.

== Profile ==
In German politics, the term liberalism is different from that in the United States, and like other European regions, it is a concept that encompasses both centre-right and centre-left. Traditionally, Frankfurter Allgemeine Zeitung represents the view of right-wing liberals, while Süddeutsche Zeitung represents the view of left-wing liberals.

The paper, often abbreviated SZ, is read throughout Germany by 1.1 million readers daily and boasts a relatively high circulation abroad. The editorial stance of the newspaper is progressive-liberal and generally of a centre-left orientation, leading some to joke that the SZ is the only meaningful opposition in the state of Bavaria, which has been governed by the conservative Christian Social Union of Bavaria almost continuously since 1949. In the 2013 elections the paper was among the supporters of the SPD.

SZ is published in Nordisch format.

== Circulation ==
During the third quarter of 1992 SZ had a circulation of 397,000 copies. The 1993 circulation of the paper was 304,499 copies. In 1995–96 it had a circulation of 407,000 copies.

Its 2001 circulation was 436,000 copies and it was one of the top 100 European newspapers. In 2003 SZ had a circulation of 433,000 copies. In the fourth quarter of 2004, it sold an average of 441,955 copies. The circulation was 429,345 copies in the first quarter of 2006. During the first quarter of 2012 it had a circulation of 432,000 copies. The circulation in 2022 was 284,503.

== Tassilo awards ==
The Tassilo awards are cultural awards presented by Süddeutsche Zeitung every two years. Since 1999, the winners of the Tassilo Cultural Prize have been nominated by readers of all regional editions in the Munich area and selected by a jury. Ten recognition awards, three main prizes, and one prize for civil courage are awarded. The SZ prize is named after Tassilo III, Duke of Bavaria. The awards themselves feature a gold-plated plaque bearing the image of the Agilolfings, which is based on a depiction on a memorial plaque at the Stift Mattsee collegiate church near Salzburg. With this prize, the Süddeutsche Zeitung aims to promote young artists and honor cultural figures in the Munich area for their often long-standing commitment.

Award winners have included:

- 2003/2004: Susanne Osthoff
- 2007/2008: Gregor Mayrhofer
- 2015/2016: Anton G. Leitner
- 2023/2024: Vanessa Hafenbrädl

== Notable writers ==
- Heribert Prantl
- Hans Leyendecker
- Rudolph Chimelli
- Frederik Obermaier
- Bastian Obermayer

== Editors-in-chief ==
- Werner Friedmann (1951–1960)
- Hermann Proebst (1960–1970)
- Hans Heigert (1970–1984)
- Dieter Schröder (1985–1995)
- Hans Werner Kilz (1996–2010)
- Kurt Kister (2011–2015)
- Kurt Kister and Wolfgang Krach (2015–2020)
- Wolfgang Krach and Judith Wittwer (since 2020)

== See also ==
- List of newspapers in Germany
- Media of Germany
