= Lu Märten =

German art historian

Louise Charlotte Märten
- Lu Märten in 1907
- Born: Anna Luise Charlotte Märten; 24 September 1879; Charlottenburg, German Empire
- Died: 12 August 1970 (aged 90); Berlin-Steglitz, East Germany
- Other names: Luzifer, Raa Bonares, Allan Loeben
- Occupations: Writer, Art critic, Socialist theorist, Women's rights activist, Editor
- Known for: Marxist aesthetics, writings on art and economics, women's rights advocacy
- Notable work: Wesen und Veränderung der Formen und Künste, Torso, das Buch eines Kindes, Meine Liedsprachen
- Political party: SPD (from 1903); KPD (from 1920)

Louise Charlotte Märten, pseudonyms: Luzifer, Raa Bonares, Allan Loeben; (24 September 1879 – 12 August 1970) was a German writer, art critic, socialist theorist and women's rights activist.

== Life ==
=== Youth ===
She was born the fourth child in a family of a former professional soldier and railway official and experienced a childhood marked by poverty and illness. All three of her siblings and her father died of tuberculosis between 1891 and 1905, and a few years later her mother also died. Märten suffered from chronic kidney disease, which was not operated on until 1905. Due to her weak condition, she was unable to attend school and acquired an extensive knowledge of history, philosophy, economics, ethnology and art history at home, with the help of her brother. The confrontation with illness and death she experienced at a young age shaped her and her way of writing.

As a teenager she became a member of the Apostolic Church in Berlin.

=== Political career ===
In 1903 she joined the SPD because its election manifesto came closest to what Märten was striving for: full equality for women and men. Through her younger brother and her fiancé Wilhelm Repsold (a sculptor and graphic artist) she came to the land reform movement and joined Friedrich Naumann's National-Social Association. Märten's first articles were published in his weekly magazine Die Hilfe. Under the influence of Naumann's social ethics, Märten wrote about art production, division of labour, machine work and their interrelationships.

At that time, Märten was working on the lyrical pieces Meine Liedsprache (1906) and the key novel Torso, Das Buch eines Kindes (1909). Märten became involved and joined as a member of an artistic-political group that also included other young editors of the weekly Die Hilfe, such as Theodor Heuss. Lu Märten also wrote feuilletons, but these political-critical texts were only published by magazines that dealt with culture from below (the working class), e.g. in Adelheid Popp's Viennese Arbeiterinnen-Zeitung and Clara Zetkin's Die Gleichheit, though Clara Zetkin refused to publish any more of her articles.

In addition to the principles of women's politics, Märten adopted the demands (emancipation of women) of the bourgeois women's movement of the time. As a playwright, she provoked with the one-act play Miners. The play was performed in 1911 during a strike in Germany and in 1930 by the revolutionary Shanghai Art Theatre (in Chinese translation). With a book on the sociology of art (Die wirtschaftliche Lage der Künstler, 1914) and a paper on workers' art education (Ästhetik und Arbeiterschaft, 1914, unpublished), Märten developed a programme for the unionization of visual artists and the everyday use of art by the working class. Lu Märten became involved in the Wirtschaftsverbände bildender Künstler Deutschlands (1915), the Genossenschaft bildender Künstler (1919) and the Deutsche Kunstgemeinschaft (1920). She developed friendships with Käthe Kollwitz, Johannes R. Becher, Raoul Hausmann, Hannah Höch, Regina Ullmann and Martin Wackernagel.

In 1918, Märten worked in the Russian news agency (ROSTA) in Berlin alongside Sophie Liebknecht and Eugen Leviné. Since 1920, when she also became a member of the KPD, she was active in that party's journalism with contributions on art and literary politics. In 1922, Märten was commissioned by the Russian state publishing house to fundamentally develop her thoughts on Marxist aesthetics. With Essence and Change of Forms/Arts, Results of Historical-Materialist Investigations (1924, 1927), she created an aesthetics of production against a universal-historical background with the thesis that artistic work, which had become independent since the Industrial Revolution, should once again lead to a unified production process (on a machine basis), following the example of the medieval workshop. In the process, "forms" would emerge that would make independent "art" superfluous. The KPD, however, rejected this process, while it came to the fore in the literary theory of Czech poetism (Bedřich Václavek) and in the Bauhaus (an art school founded by Walter Gropius in Weimar).

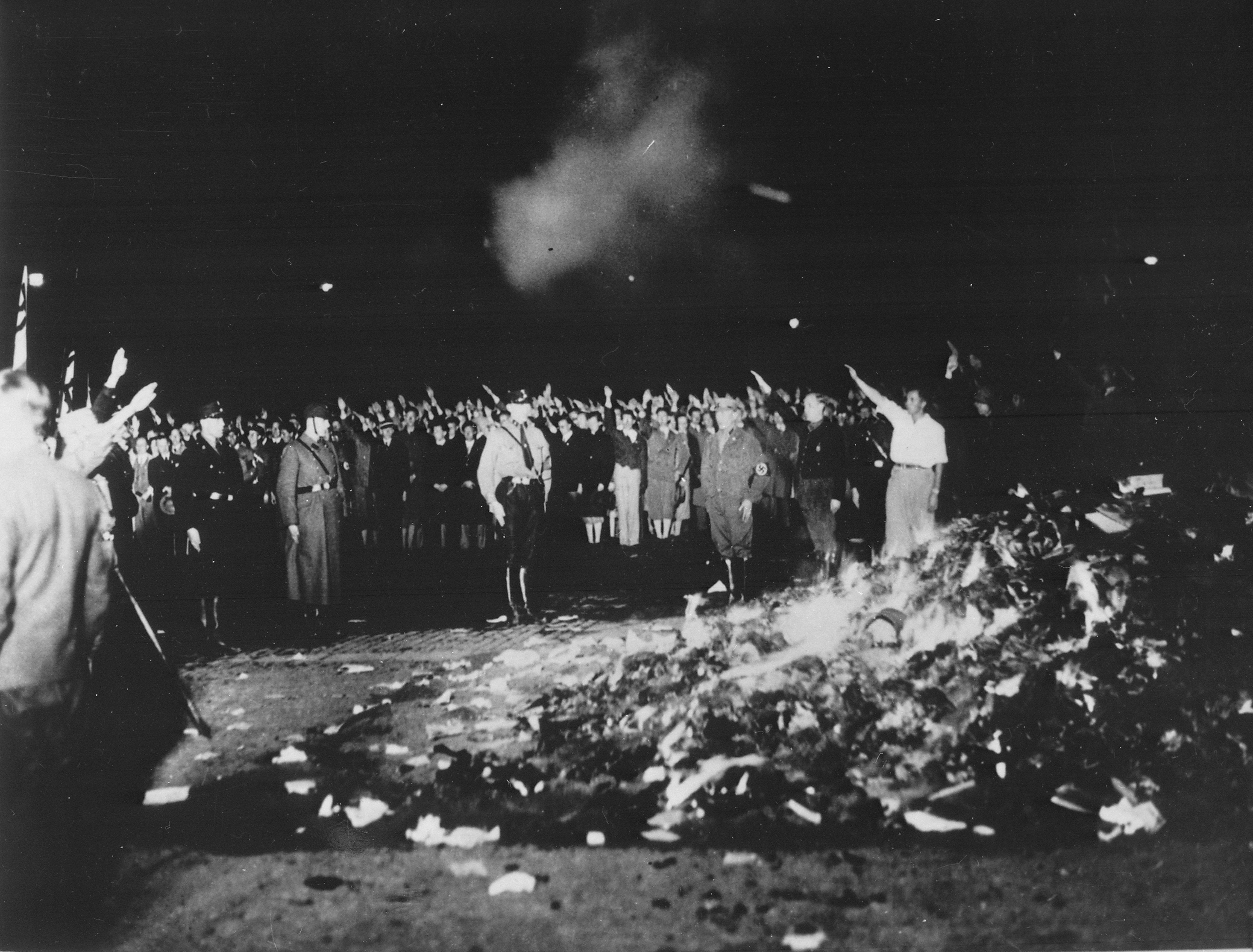
Book burning on Mai 10, 1933 in Berlin in the Opernplatz

In 1933, when Adolf Hitler came to power, many books were burned on 10 May in the Opernplatz in Berlin (as in other German cities), including the works of Märten. She was a member of the Reich Chamber of Literature, but published nothing worth mentioning any more and was expelled in 1941. From 1936 onwards it was very difficult for Märten to publish her socially critical texts. She had no choice but to write some film scripts. She also took the opportunity to finish her two-volume novel Yali, which remained unpublished. She received a small income by renting out her room and through support from Wilhelm Repsold. Despite the difficult circumstances, she remained true to her socio-political views. In 1940 she began writing again. She occasionally worked at the Prussian State Library and wrote industrial chronicles (company and production history).

=== After the Second World War ===
After 1945, she tried to build on previous successes, but did not succeed. Her critiques were considered outdated (frowned upon in the West, unorthodox in the East) and thus no longer relevant. While working in the Bund zur demokratischen Erneuerung Deutschlands, she reissued her Marxist Aesthetics for the Young Generation in 1949. It was to them (the young generation) that Lu Märten addressed a simply narrated didactic piece, Bürgermeister Tschech und seine Tochter, Erinnerungen an den Vormärz 1844. Lu Märten lived in West Berlin and participated in the cultural life of East Berlin until 1961. From 1949, she received an honorary pension from there in honour of her work.

She last worked as an editor and helped to expand the Volksbücherei Steglitz.

== Works ==
- 1987 Frauen und Film Ausgaben 42–47 (Rotbuch Verlag)
- 1982 Formen für den Alltag. Schriften, Aufsätze, Vorträge. Verlag der Kunst, Dresden (Fundus-Reihe 79)
- 1973 Materialistische Literaturtheorie IV. Lu Märten Kunsttheorie zwischen marxschem Arbeitsbegriff und sozialdemokratischer Technikgläubigkeit (alternative 89, 16. Jahrgang, April 1973)
- 1952 Georg Forster. Ein Lesebuch für unsere Zeit. Hg. von Gerhard Steiner und Manfred Häcker unter Mitarbeit von Lu Märten. Weimar
- 1949 Wesen und Veränderung der Formen und Künste (Verlag Werden und Wirken)
- 1948 Bürgermeister Tschech und seine Tochter: Erinnerungen an den Vormärz (1844), (Altberliner Verlag L. Groszer)
- 1924 Bergarbeiter: Schauspiel in einem Akt, 2. Auflage (Verlag Taifun)
- 1920 Historisch-Materialistisches über Wesens und Veränderung der Künste: (eine pragmatische Einleitung), (Verlag der Jugendinternationale)
- 1914 Die Künstlerin (Neuauflage 2001 von Chryssoula Kambas im Aisthesis-Verlag ISBN 3895282987)
- 1914 Die wirtschaftliche Lage der Künstler (München bei Georg Müller)
- 1913 100 Silhouetten (Verlag Beyer)
- 1909 Torso, das Buch eines Kindes (Piper Verlag)
- 1907 Meine Liedsprachen: Gedichte (Hilfe Verlag)

== Quotes ==
Around the turn of the century, there were hardly any female art critics who dared to write an opinion different from that of their male colleagues. Märten expressed her opinion at the time with the following quote:

- All the problems of today's woman as an artist and worker are social problems, therefore they alone require social solutions - everything else about 'nature' and 'destiny' (...) is claptrap. What do we know about our destiny or nature's intention.

Another quote clearly reflects her socio-political convictions and that she always strove for equal rights for women in society:

- I emphasise that I am deliberately not getting into the question or assertion here of whether or not women are ever capable of acts of art - genius, etc. I rather presuppose that they are, and examine inhibitions to this spiritual and social expansion - of being genius.

== Other ==
The "Lu Märten Association for Women's Studies in Art and Cultural Studies" has existed since 1987.

== Bibliography ==
- Chryssoula Kambas (1987). "Märten, Lu". Neue Deutsche Biographie (in German). Vol. 15. Berlin: Duncker & Humblot. pp. 641–643. (full text online).
- Kambas, Chryssoula, Die Werkstatt als Utopie. Lu Märtens literarische Arbeit und Formästhetik seit 1900, Max Niemeyer Verlag 1988, ISBN 3-484-35019-9
- Rosenberg, Johanna, Lu Märten Entwurf einer historisch-materialistischen Theorie der Künste. Zum 100. Geburtstag der marxistischen Kunsttheoretikerin. In: Weimarer Beiträge. 1979, Heft 10, S. 39–67.
- Märten, Lu, „Die Künstlerin“, (Herausgeber) Chryssoula Kambas, Neuauflage, Aisthesis, 2001, ISBN 3895282987
- Lu Märten. In: FemBio. Frauen-Biographieforschung (mit Literaturangaben und Zitaten).
