= The Long Breakup =

- Directed by: Katya Soldak
- Written by: Katya Soldak
- Screenplay by: Katya Soldak with family and friends
- Produced by: Katya Soldak, Michael (JM) Treves, Ante Media Inc. (USA)
- Starring: Katya Soldak, family and friends
- Cinematography: Katya Soldak, Oleksandr Yanovsky
- Edited by: Olga Lvoff
- Music by: Sasha Gusev
- Release date: 2020
- Running time: 86 minutes
- Country: United States
- Language: English

The Long Breakup is a long term documentary film about Russia–Ukraine relations directed by Katya Soldak which premiered at the 2020 East Oregon Film Festival.

The documentary was broadcast in a German version titled Das Ukraine-Dilemma on the television channel Arte at the end of March 2022.

== Synopsis ==
The documentary film was written and directed by Ukrainian-born, New York City-based Katya Soldak. Soldak works for Forbes.

The film explores the complex relationship between Ukraine and Russia, particularly in the aftermath of end of Soviet Union. It features interviews with ordinary citizens (especially the filmmaker's family and friends), politicians and experts.

Through personal stories and analysis of historical and political factors, The Long Breakup sheds light on the tensions and challenges facing Ukraine and its people.

== Reception ==
John Rash, an editorial writer and columnist for Star Tribune, writes that the film “gives context to conflict in Ukraine” and that it “shows how Ukraine’s history has been shaped by its relationship with Russia”.

The European public service channel Arte writes, the journalist Katya Soldak tells of the attempts of her home country, Ukraine, to emancipate itself from its overpowering neighbor Russia.

== Accolades ==
According to the film-website from Ante Media:

- Best Of Fest, 41 Minneapolis–Saint Paul International Film Festival, 2022
- Winner, Docs Without Borders Film Festival, 2020
- Official Selection, NewFilmmakers NY, 2021
