= Katherine (disambiguation) =

Katherine is a female given name.

Katherine, Catherine or Katharine may also refer to:

== People ==
=== Royalty ===
- Catherine of England (disambiguation), various queen consorts
- Catherine of Lancaster (1373–1418), queen consort of Henry III, King of Castile
- Catherine of Portugal (nun) (1436–1463), fourth daughter of Edward, King of Portugal
- Catherine de' Medici (1519–1589), queen consort of Henry II, King of France
- Catherine I of Russia (1684–1727; r. 1725–1727), Empress of Russia
- Catherine the Great (1729–1796; r. 1762–1796), Empress of Russia
- Princess Katherine of Greece and Denmark (1913–2007), youngest child of Constantine I, King of the Hellenes
- Katharine, Duchess of Kent (1933–2025), wife of Prince Edward, Duke of Kent
- Katherine Karađorđević (born 1943), wife of Alexander, Crown Prince of Yugoslavia
- Catherine, Princess of Wales (born 1982), wife of William, Prince of Wales

=== Saints ===
- Catherine of Alexandria (c. 287 – c. 305)
- Catherine of Vadstena (1331 or 1332 – 1381)
- Catherine of Siena (1347–1380)
- Catherine of Bologna (1413–1463)
- Catherine of Genoa (c. 1447 – 1510)
- Catherine de' Ricci (1522–1590)

== Arts and entertainment ==
=== Film and television ===
- Katherine (film), a 1975 American television film
- Catherine (1986 TV series), a French television series
- Catherine (1999 TV series), a Canadian sitcom
- "Catherine" (Masters of Sex), a 2013 television episode

=== Literature ===
- Catherine (Thackeray novel), 1839–1840
- Catherine, a 1942 novel by Mika Waltari
- Katherine (Seton novel), 1954
- Catherine (Benzoni novel), 1963
- Katherine (Min novel), 1995

=== Music ===
- "Catherine", a 1969 song by Romuald Figuier
- "Katharine", a song from the 1980 album The Return of the Durutti Column
- Catherine (alternative rock band), active from 1985 to 1998

=== Other arts and entertainment ===
- Catherine (video game), 2011

== Places ==
=== Australia ===
- Katherine, Northern Territory, a settlement
- Town of Katherine, a local government area in the Northern Territory

=== United States ===
- Catherine, Alabama
- Katherine, Arizona
- Catherine, Colorado

== Ships ==
- Catherine (ship), various ships
- HMS Katherine, various British Royal Navy ships
- HMY Katherine, various yachts
- USS Katherine (SP-715), a United States Navy patrol vessel commissioned in 1917

== Other uses ==
- List of storms named Katherine, various tropical cyclones

== See also ==
- Catalina (disambiguation)
- Catarina (disambiguation)
- Catharine (disambiguation)
- Catherina (disambiguation)
- Catherine Creek, Oregon, United States
- Catherine Creek (Kettle River tributary), Washington (state), United States
- Catherine-de-Barnes, West Midlands, England, United Kingdom
- Catherine the Great (2015 TV series), a Russian television series
- Catrine, East Ayrshire, Scotland, United Kingdom
- Catriona (disambiguation)
- Ekaterina (disambiguation)
- Karen (disambiguation)
- Katerine (disambiguation)
- Katerini, Greece
- Katherine Region, Northern Territory, Australia
- Katherine River, Northern Territory, Australia
- Kathryn (disambiguation)
- Katrina (disambiguation)
- Kitty (disambiguation)
- Lake Catherine (disambiguation)
- Saint Catherine of Alexandria (disambiguation)
- Saint Catherine's Monastery (disambiguation)
- St. Catherine (disambiguation)
- USS Katherine K. (SP-220), a United States Navy patrol vessel and tug commissioned in 1917
- William and Catherine (disambiguation)
- Yekaterinburg, Russia
