= Lake Kathryn =

Lake Kathryn may refer to:

- Lake Kathryn, Florida, a census-designated place in Lake County, Florida, US
- Lake Kathryn (Idaho), an alpine lake in Custer County, Idaho, US

== See also ==
- Lake Katherine, a lake in New Mexico, US
- Lake Katharine State Nature Preserve, a nature preserve in Jackson County, Ohio, US
- Lake Catherine (disambiguation)
- Kathryn (disambiguation)
