= Santa Fe Lake =

Santa Fe Lake may refer to:

- Santa Fe Dam
- Santa Fe Lake, Gilbert, Arizona
- Lake Santa Fe, Alachua County, Florida
- Santa Fe Lake (New Mexico)
- Santa Fe Reservoir
- Santa Fe watershed
