= Lake Catherine =

Lake Catherine may refer to:

- Lake Catherine (Arkansas), a lake in the US
- Lake Catherine, Illinois, a census-designated place

== See also ==
- Lake Katherine, a lake in New Mexico, US
- Lake Katharine State Nature Preserve, a nature preserve in Jackson County, Ohio, US
- Lake Kathryn (disambiguation)
- Catherine (disambiguation)
