= Catherine (ship) =

Several vessels have been named Catherine:

- Catherine, of 100 tons (bm), was brig built in Bermuda of mahogany and Bermuda cedar. She was sheathed in 1786, but may have been built earlier and had the name Santa Catalina. She first appeared in Lloyd's Register (LR) in the volume for 1786, with W.M'Donough, master, P.Morgan, owner, and voyage Mississippi to London. On 1 December 1787, he sailed to Africa on an enslaving voyage. Catherine arrived at La Balize, Louisiana on 9 September 1788, with 294 captives. She then became a Liverpool-based West Indiaman. In 1792 she made a second enslaving voyage. Captain James Mcewan replaced M'Donough and sailed from Liverpool on 27 October 1792 on a second enslaving voyage. Catherine started acquiring captives at Ambriz at 6 April 1793. Captain McEwan died of a fever on 17 April; Captain William Makee replaced him. Catherine sailed from Africa on 8 July, and arrived at Kingston on 18 September. She had embarked 163 captives and she arrived with 167. At Kingston she was condemned. She had left Liverpool with 16 crew members and had suffered four crew deaths on her voyage.
- Catherine (1793 ship), of 245 tons (bm), was launched in the United States. Beyond that, her origins are obscure. She came to be registered at Bristol and made one complete voyage in 1793 as a slave ship in the triangular trade in enslaved people. War with France broke out while Catherine was on her first voyage. She first appeared in Lloyd's Register (LR), in the volume for 1794. Before she set out on her second voyage, her captain acquired a letter of marque. The French captured her in 1794 as she was setting out on her second slave trading voyage.
- HMS Catherine (1794), of possibly mercantile origins, was purchased in 1794 for use as a fireship. She and the other eleven vessels purchased at the same time were never expended. Instead, they served with Sir Sidney Smith's squadron off France's north coast. She was paid off in 1799 and sold in 1801.
- Catherine (1811 ship) was a whaler, launched in 1811 at New Bedford, that made seven whaling voyages between 1813 and 1831. She also made one voyage transporting convicts from England to New South Wales in 1813.
- TSS Catherine (1903), a passenger ship on the Gravesend–Tilbury Ferry service 1903-1960, sister of Carlotta and Gertrude
- HMS Catherine (1942), an Auk-class minesweeper, in service 1943-1946 under Lend-Lease; later served in Turkish Navy as TCG Erdemli.

== See also ==
- HMS Katherine, various British Royal Navy ships
- HMY Katherine, various yachts
- USS Katherine (SP-715), a United States Navy patrol vessel commissioned in 1917
