= HMY Katherine =

HMY Katherine is the name of the following royal yachts:

- HMY Katherine (1661)
- HMY Katherine (1674)

== See also ==
- Catherine (ship), various ships
- HMS Katherine, various British Royal Navy ships
- Katherine (disambiguation)
- USS Katherine, a United States Navy patrol vessel commissioned in 1917
