= Three Bees =

1813 British ship transporting convicts to Australia

History

United Kingdom
- Name: Three Bees
- Owner: Buckles & Co
- Port of registry: London
- Launched: 1813
- Fate: Caught fire and blew up in Sydney Harbour on 20 May 1814.

General characteristics
- Tons burthen: 459 (bm)
- Armament: 4 × 12-pounder carronades

Three Bees was launched at Bridgwater in 1813. Her first voyage was transporting convicts to New South Wales. After she arrived at Sydney Cove in 1814 she caught fire and was destroyed.

== Voyage and loss ==
Captain John Wallis and Three Bees gathered her convicts from Ireland. She then sailed to Falmouth.

Three Bees sailed from Falmouth on 8 December 1813. The 46th Regiment of Foot provided the guard, which consisted of five officers and 43 non-commissioned officers and privates. Three Bees left in convoy under the escort of HMS Niger and Tagus. They parted after about a month and Three Bees continued on in company with Catherine. Three Bees arrived in Sydney Cove on 6 May 1814.

Three Bees had embarked 210 male convicts, of whom nine died en route. Governor Macquarie wrote:

The Three Bees, commanded by Captn. John Wallis, arrived on the 6th inst. with two hundred and ten male Convicts, out of 219 originally embarked, the other nine having died on the passage; and out of those landed, it has been necessary to Send fifty five to the Hospital many of them being much affected with Scurvy and others labouring under various complaints. On enquiring into the cause of this mortality and sickness, it appeared that many of them had been embarked in a bad state of health, and not a few infirm from lameness and old age. I am happy in being enabled to state that the Convicts by the Catherine and the Three Bees have, without a Single Exception, borne grateful Testimony to their having been treated with the most unremitting care, Attention, and kindness, by the Masters and Surgeons of those Vessels, from the day of their Embarkation until they were finally landed here. The circumstance of several of those unfortunate men being embarked in a diseased or feeble State will, I trust, shew the necessity for greater attention being paid to the state of the Health of the Convicts, who are to be embarked in future, which I have much reason to believe has not been so fully attended to by the Examining Surgeons as Humanity demands.

After the 210 convicts were all disembarked a fire was discovered on the ship at 4.30 pm on 20 May 1814. It was later thought that the fire was caused by candle snuff being dropped on oakum when an officer and boy had entered the hold. It soon became apparent that the fire could not be fought and so Three Bees was cut loose from her moorings and the other ships in the cove maneuvered to avoid the ship. At 5.30 pm the first gun exploded on board and a swivel ball smashed into the parlour of the house of Captain Piper, hitting only a writing table. The ship drifted onto Bennelong Point and shortly after her magazine exploded. Three Bees was a total loss.

Lloyd's List reported on 14 October 1814 that Three Bees, Wallace, master, of London and bound for China, caught fire and was burnt at Port Jackson on 20 May.
