= Upper Redfish Lakes =

Alpine lakes in the state of Idaho

The Upper Redfish Lakes are a chain of small alpine glacial lakes in Custer County, Idaho, United States, located in the Sawtooth Mountains in the Sawtooth National Recreation Area. The lakes are drained by an unnamed creek that is a tributary of Redfish Lake Creek, which flows into the Salmon River. There are no trails that lead to the lakes, although they are most easily accessed from Sawtooth National Forest trail 154 along Redfish Lake Creek.

The Upper Redfish Lakes are in the Sawtooth Wilderness, and a wilderness permit can be obtained at a registration box at trailheads or wilderness boundaries. Just to the south of the Upper Redfish Lakes is Lake Kathryn.

Upper Redfish Lakes
Lake	Elevation	Max. length	Max. width	Location
Upper Redfish Lake 1	2,644 m (8,675 ft)	419 m (1,375 ft)	145 m (476 ft)	44.046122°N 115.035547°W
Upper Redfish Lake 2	2,646 m (8,681 ft)	530 m (1,740 ft)	178 m (584 ft)	44.049172°N 115.033656°W
Upper Redfish Lake 3	2,670 m (8,760 ft)	097 m (318 ft)	063 m (207 ft)	44.052647°N 115.031814°W
Upper Redfish Lake 4	2,708 m (8,885 ft)	065 m (213 ft)	047 m (154 ft)	44.053861°N 115.036028°W
Upper Redfish Lake 5	2,752 m (9,029 ft)	051 m (167 ft)	032 m (105 ft)	44.055047°N 115.040336°W

== See also ==
- List of lakes of the Sawtooth Mountains (Idaho)
- Sawtooth National Forest
- Sawtooth National Recreation Area
- Sawtooth Range (Idaho)
