= HMS Katherine =

HMS Katherine (or Catherine) has been the name of various ships of the British Royal Navy:

- HMS Katherine (1402), a ship purchased in 1402 and scrapped in 1406
- HMS Katherine (1415), a ship purchased in 1415 and sold in 1425
- HMS Katherine (1653), a 36-gun ship captured in 1653 and sold in 1658
- HMS Katherine (1661), an 8-gun yacht launched in 1661 and lost in 1673
- HMS Katherine (1664), an 82-gun second rate launched in 1664, also known as Royal Katherine from 1696, renamed Ramillies in 1706, and wrecked in 1760
- HMS Katherine (1672), the name of two fireships purchased in 1672, one of which was expended in 1672 and the other in 1673
- HMS Katherine (1674), an 8-gun yacht launched in 1674, renamed Catherine in 1720, and sold in 1801
- HMS Katherine (1692), a storeship purchased in 1692 and sold in 1701
- HMS Catherine (1794), a fireship, in service until 1801
- HMS Catherine (J12), an Auk-class minesweeper in service 1943-1946 under Lend-Lease; later served in Turkish Navy as TCG Erdemli

== See also ==
- Catherine (ship), various ships
- HMY Katherine, various yachts
- USS Katherine (SP-715), a United States Navy patrol vessel commissioned in 1917
