= Pecos Wilderness =

Wilderness area in Nex Mexico, US

Pecos Wilderness (Forest Service)
- IUCN category Ib (wilderness area)
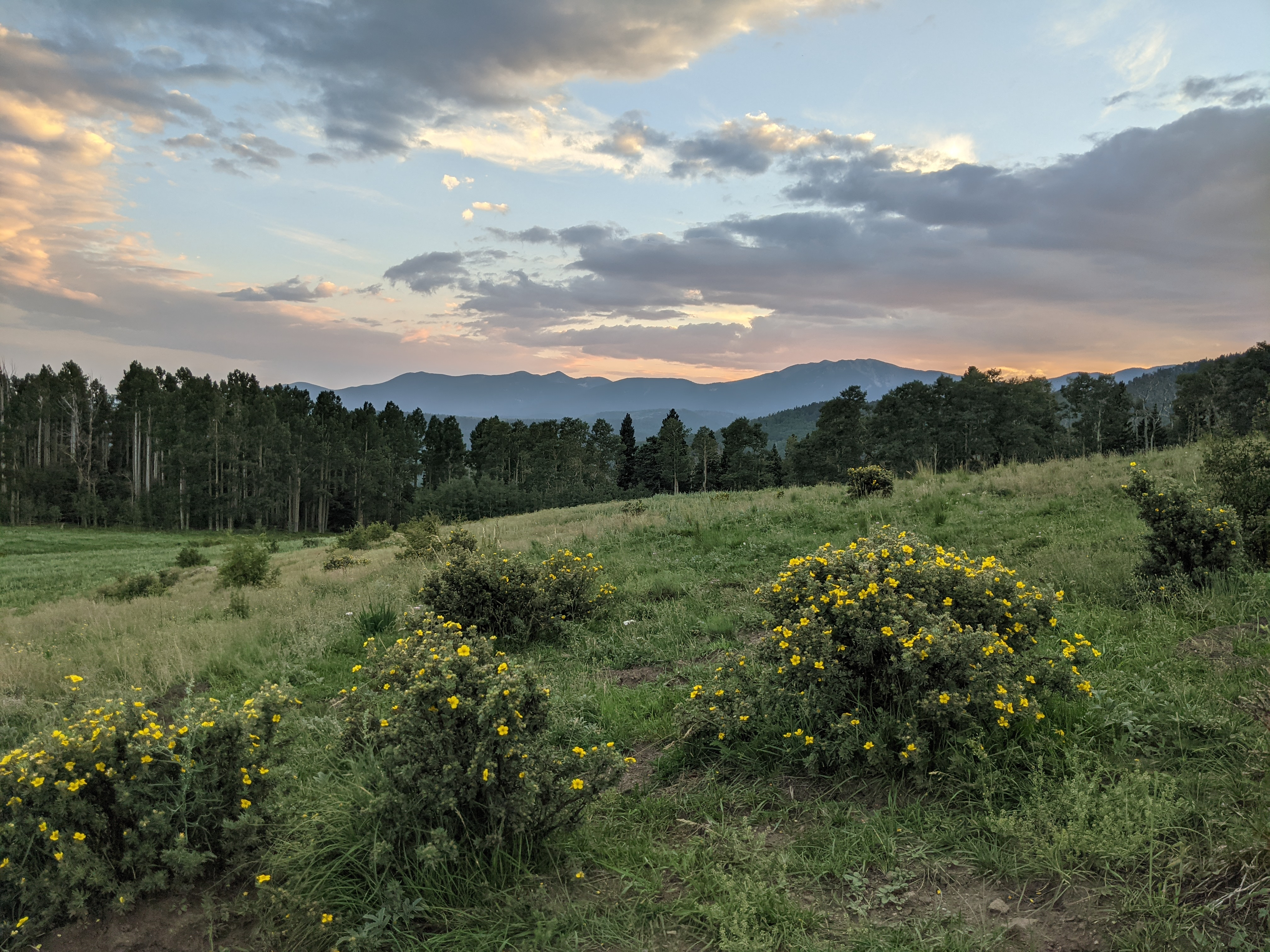
- On the west side of Round Mountain in the Pecos Wilderness via the Jack's Creek Trail

- Location within New Mexico
- Location: Santa Fe, New Mexico, United States
- Coordinates: 35°53′38″N 105°38′42″W
- Area: 223,667 acres (905.15 km^{2})
- Established: 1980

The Pecos Wilderness is a protected wilderness area within the Santa Fe National Forest and Carson National Forest. The Pecos Wilderness lies within the Camino Real Ranger District of the Carson National Forest, and the Pecos Ranger District and Espanola Ranger District of the Santa Fe National Forest. The Pecos Wilderness includes the southernmost extension of the Rocky Mountains in the sub-range of the Sangre de Cristo Mountains of north central New Mexico. One trail head for the wilderness is only 15 miles by road from Santa Fe, the state capital. Covering an area of 223,667 acres (90,515 ha)(350 sq mi) it is the second largest wilderness in the state after the Gila Wilderness. An area of fewer than 200,000 acres (81,000 ha) was given wilderness protection by Congress in 1964. Congress protected an additional 55,000 acres (22,000 ha) in 1980. The Wilderness boasts one of the highest concentrations of peaks exceeding 12,000 feet (3,700 m) in elevation in New Mexico, including Santa Fe Baldy, 12,622 feet (3,847 m), the highest point in Santa Fe County, and South Truchas Peak, 13,102 feet (3,993 m), the second highest peak in the state.

U.S. Wilderness Areas do not allow motorized or mechanized vehicles, including bicycles. Camping and fishing are allowed with proper permit, but no roads, buildings, logging or mining are permitted. Wilderness areas within National Forests and Bureau of Land Management areas allow hunting in season.

== History ==
Little archaeological or historical research has been conducted within the Pecos Wilderness. However, researchers have found artifacts dating back to the Paleo-Indian Period (7,000–6,000 BC). Most artifacts found date back to the late Archaic period (900 BC–400 AD). These items have been dated back to late pueblo and Anasazi times. Ultimately, none of the sites surveyed display proof of long-term occupation. It is thought that use by indigenous people was seasonal and temporary. Groups would hunt and gather in the mountains during the summer months and return to lower elevations in the winter. The first known occupation of the Pecos Wilderness began in 1598 with the colonization by Spain. During the next 200 years, they would push into the fertile lands that flanked the Sangre de Cristo Mountain range. New Mexico was annexed to the United States following the Mexican war of 1846. In 1875 mineral prospecting began. George Beatty was an early pioneer who built a cabin at the junction of the Pecos River and the Rito del Padre. Beatty flats are named after him.

== Climate ==
Wesner Springs is a SNOTEL weather station in the Pecos Wilderness, located near the summit of Elk Mountain (New Mexico). Wesner Springs has a subalpine climate (Köppen Dfc).

Climate data for Wesner Springs, New Mexico, 1991–2020 normals, 1989–2020 extremes: 11120ft (3389m)
Month	Jan	Feb	Mar	Apr	May	Jun	Jul	Aug	Sep	Oct	Nov	Dec	Year
Record high °F (°C)	57 (14)	68 (20)	76 (24)	75 (24)	76 (24)	89 (32)	87 (31)	94 (34)	85 (29)	78 (26)	72 (22)	66 (19)	94 (34)
Mean maximum °F (°C)	48.8 (9.3)	48.7 (9.3)	55.6 (13.1)	58.7 (14.8)	64.2 (17.9)	74.4 (23.6)	74.9 (23.8)	71.6 (22.0)	68.7 (20.4)	63.1 (17.3)	54.3 (12.4)	50.2 (10.1)	77.7 (25.4)
Mean daily maximum °F (°C)	33.1 (0.6)	34.6 (1.4)	41.1 (5.1)	45.6 (7.6)	53.3 (11.8)	63.7 (17.6)	65.8 (18.8)	63.8 (17.7)	58.5 (14.7)	49.1 (9.5)	40.2 (4.6)	32.9 (0.5)	48.5 (9.2)
Daily mean °F (°C)	23.8 (−4.6)	24.9 (−3.9)	30.1 (−1.1)	34.8 (1.6)	42.9 (6.1)	52.2 (11.2)	54.9 (12.7)	53.5 (11.9)	48.5 (9.2)	39.7 (4.3)	31.0 (−0.6)	24.0 (−4.4)	38.4 (3.5)
Mean daily minimum °F (°C)	14.3 (−9.8)	15.1 (−9.4)	19.2 (−7.1)	24.1 (−4.4)	32.4 (0.2)	40.6 (4.8)	44.1 (6.7)	43.1 (6.2)	38.5 (3.6)	30.4 (−0.9)	21.8 (−5.7)	15.0 (−9.4)	28.2 (−2.1)
Mean minimum °F (°C)	−1.4 (−18.6)	−0.9 (−18.3)	2.7 (−16.3)	9.6 (−12.4)	19.6 (−6.9)	30.5 (−0.8)	36.7 (2.6)	37.2 (2.9)	28.6 (−1.9)	14.2 (−9.9)	3.1 (−16.1)	−3.6 (−19.8)	−7.2 (−21.8)
Record low °F (°C)	−15 (−26)	−23 (−31)	−14 (−26)	−4 (−20)	7 (−14)	22 (−6)	25 (−4)	23 (−5)	9 (−13)	0 (−18)	−10 (−23)	−18 (−28)	−23 (−31)
Average precipitation inches (mm)	2.60 (66)	2.55 (65)	3.43 (87)	2.98 (76)	2.15 (55)	2.06 (52)	5.31 (135)	4.92 (125)	2.88 (73)	2.70 (69)	2.65 (67)	2.92 (74)	37.15 (944)
Average extreme snow depth inches (cm)	34.8 (88)	42.4 (108)	43.6 (111)	35.6 (90)	18.2 (46)	2.6 (6.6)	0.0 (0.0)	0.0 (0.0)	0.9 (2.3)	5.1 (13)	12.8 (33)	27.8 (71)	50.4 (128)
Source: XMACIS2

== Environment ==
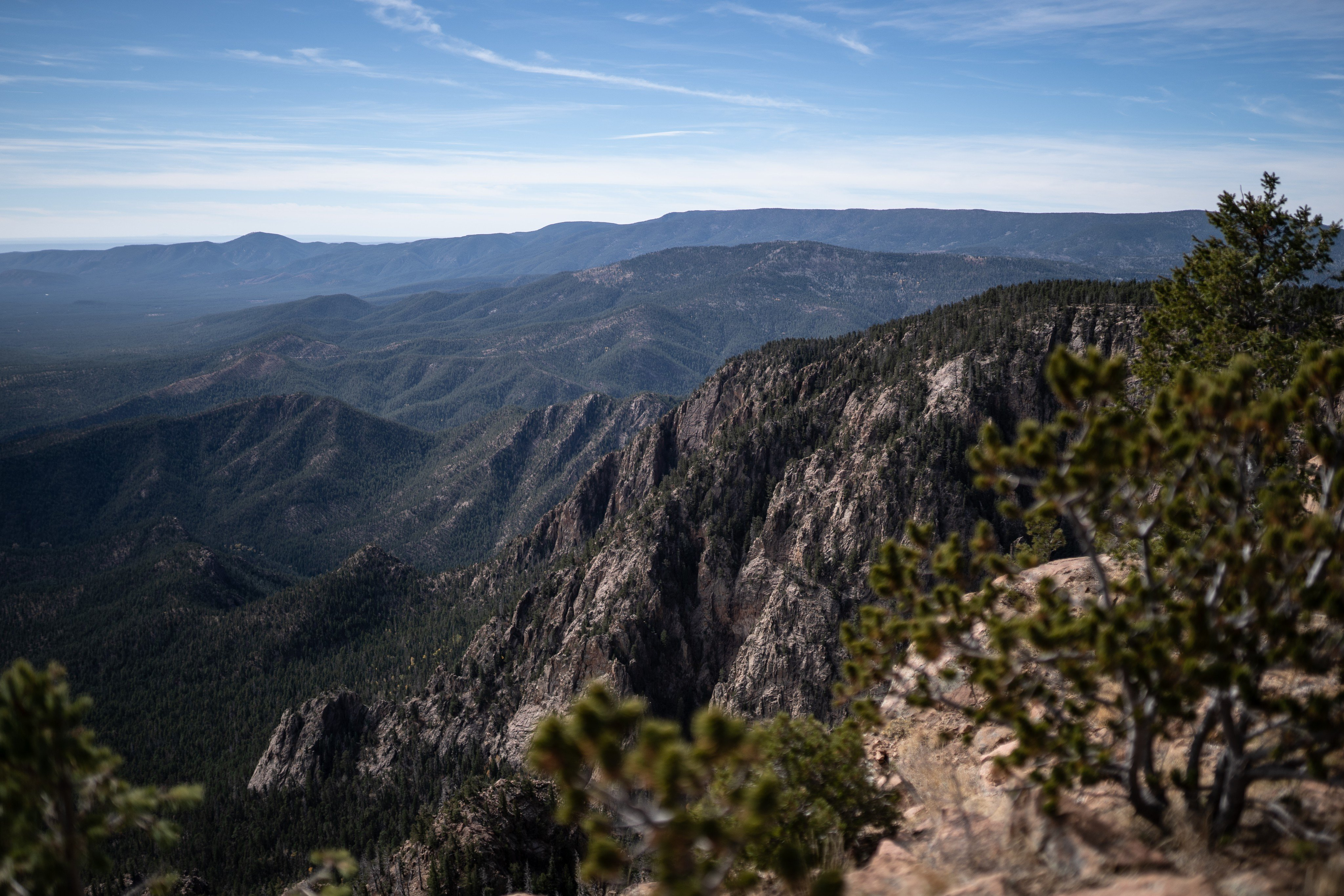
Looking South from Hermit Peak, Pecos Wilderness, Santa Fe National Forest

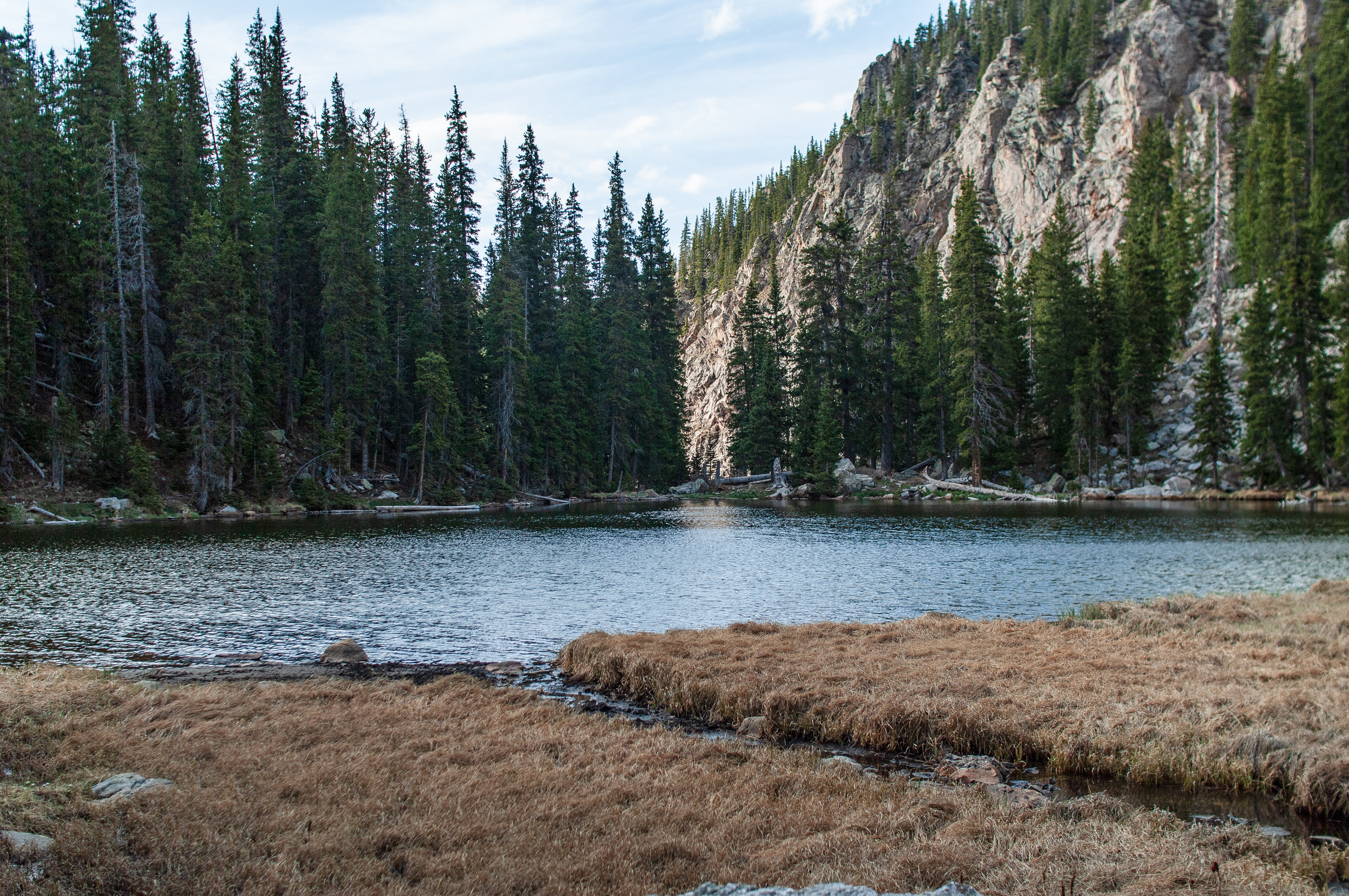
Looking north across Nambe Lake at an elevation of 11,402 feet

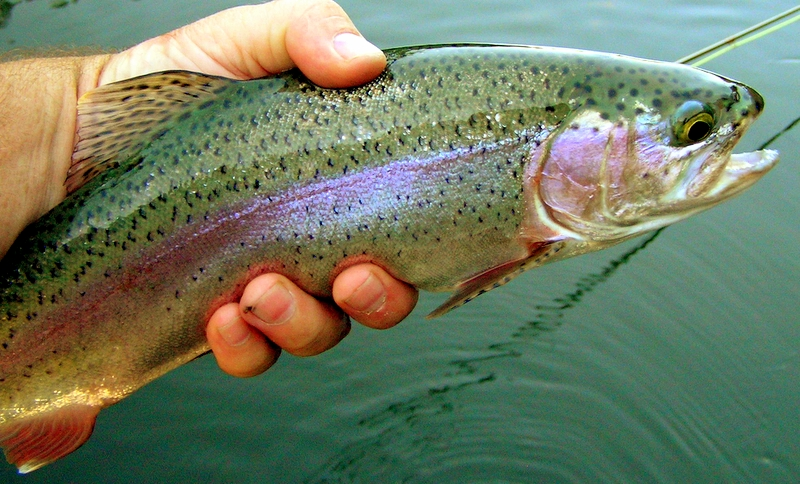
Rainbow trout: A common fish found in the lakes and streams of the Pecos Wilderness

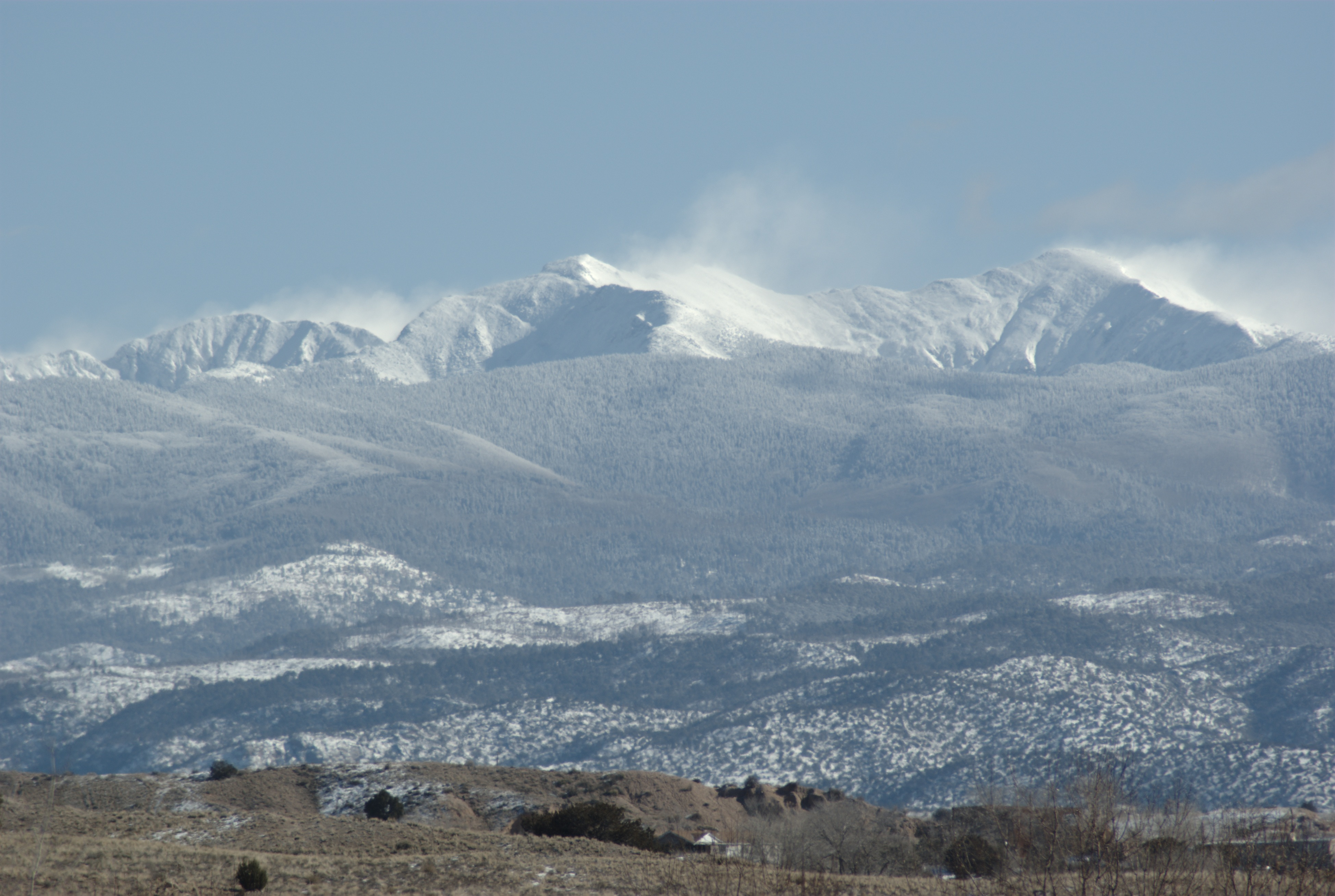
Truchas Peaks from Espanola in winter. The peaks are the highest mountains in the Pecos Wilderness.

The high altitude of the Pecos provides a cool change from the lower deserts and brushlands. Temperatures vary with season and elevation. Summer daytime temperatures average 70 °F (21 °C), dropping to lows of 30 °F (−1 °C) at nighttime. Fall and springtime highs range from the 50s to lows in the teens. Winter temperatures below 0 °F (−18 °C) are not uncommon. May and June are usually dry months, and July and August typically come with showers and thunderstorms. Annual precipitation is from 35 to 40 inches. About half comes during summer and half in winter.

The Pecos Wilderness is made up of deep and narrow canyons, long and broad mesa tops, heavily forested slopes, and rugged ridges with peaks above timberline characterize the Sangre de Cristo Mountains of the Pecos Wilderness. This small mountain chain occupies the extreme southern extent of the Rocky Mountains.

Fifteen lakes across the Pecos offer fishing and fly fishing to locals, tourists, and natives. The Pecos has around 150 miles (240 km) of streams holding rainbow trout, brown trout, and cutthroat trout.

The scenery ranges from 100-foot waterfalls and crumbled talus slopes to dramatic cliff rocks, towering peaks, and wildflower meadows.

== Topography ==
The Pecos Wilderness is a heavily forested, high-elevation and rugged mountain land, ranging from 8,400 feet to over 13,000 feet. Truchas Peak, at 13,103 feet, is the second highest point in New Mexico. River valleys and streams are separated by long, broad mesas. The Sangre de Cristo Mountains run northeast to southwest across the wilderness, separating broad mesas to the east from rugged canyons and ridges to the west.

== Wildlife ==
The forest of the wilderness consists of Engelmann spruce, corkbark fir, ponderosa pine, Douglas fir, white fir, limber pine, bristlecone pine, and aspen trees. In addition to the various types of trees, the Pecos has a diverse wildlife. Elk, deer, coyotes, bear, turkey, squirrels, beavers, and a herd of Rocky Mountain bighorn sheep, are found in the Pecos region. Furthermore, there is a bird population made up of white-tailed ptarmigan, blue grouse, Steller's jay, raven, raptors and a variety of different species of hummingbirds and woodpeckers.
