= Kathryn (disambiguation) =

Kathryn is a given name.

Kathryn may also refer to:

- Kathryn (album), a 2014 album by Kathryn Bernardo
- Kathryn, North Dakota, a city in Barnes County, North Dakota, United States
- Kathryn (skipjack), a Chesapeake Bay boat built in 1901
- Kathryn Spirit, an open-hatch bulk carrier built in 1967

== See also ==
- Lake Kathryn (disambiguation)
- Catherine (disambiguation)
- Katherine (disambiguation)
- Kathryn Tucker Windham Museum, a biographical museum in Thomasville, Alabama, United States
