= Santa Fe Lake (New Mexico) =

Lake in New Mexico, United States of America

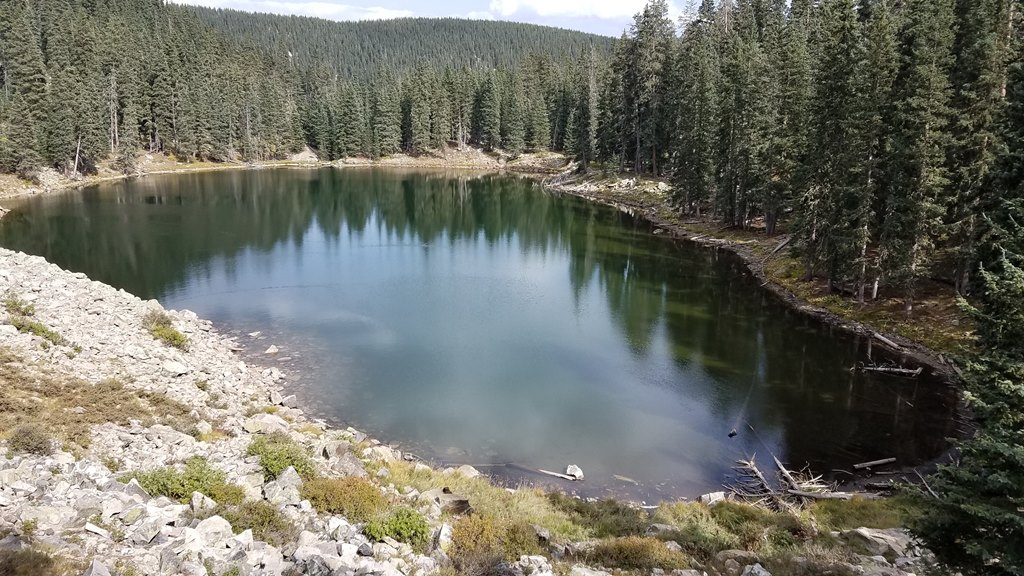

- Location within New Mexico
- Location: Santa Fe County, New Mexico, United States
- Coordinates: 35°47′20″N 105°46′39″W
- Type: reservoir, natural lake
- Basin countries: United States
- Surface area: 3 acres (1.2 ha)
- Average depth: 15 ft (4.6 m)
- Surface elevation: 6,940 ft (2,120 m)
- Settlements: Santa Fe, New Mexico

Santa Fe Lake is a natural lake in the southern Sangre de Cristo Mountains near Ski Santa Fe in Santa Fe County, New Mexico. The lake is formed by snowmelt from Tesuque Peak and Lake Peak. It was named after the nearby state capital of Santa Fe, New Mexico, which was founded in 1610 as the capital of the Spanish province of Santa Fe de Nuevo México.

According to the United States Geological Survey, Santa Fe Lake is the "southernmost subalpine lake in the Rocky Mountains." The lake is the source of the Santa Fe River. Water from the lake flows downstream while picking up runoff from the larger Santa Fe watershed area which covers 285 square miles. The water is then collected in reservoirs prior to treatment at the Canyon Road Water Treatment Plant.

== Climate ==
There is a weather station nearby at an altitude of 11445ft (3488m).

Climate data for Santa Fe SNOTEL, New Mexico (11445ft or 3488m), 1997–2020 normals
| Month | Jan | Feb | Mar | Apr | May | Jun | Jul | Aug | Sep | Oct | Nov | Dec | Year |
|---|---|---|---|---|---|---|---|---|---|---|---|---|---|
| Record high °F (°C) | 59 (15) | 52 (11) | 60 (16) | 67 (19) | 75 (24) | 81 (27) | 78 (26) | 76 (24) | 72 (22) | 67 (19) | 61 (16) | 50 (10) | 81 (27) |
| Mean maximum °F (°C) | 45.9 (7.7) | 47.0 (8.3) | 51.9 (11.1) | 55.5 (13.1) | 63.6 (17.6) | 73.3 (22.9) | 74.0 (23.3) | 70.9 (21.6) | 66.8 (19.3) | 59.6 (15.3) | 51.6 (10.9) | 46.2 (7.9) | 75.0 (23.9) |
| Mean daily maximum °F (°C) | 30.2 (−1.0) | 31.3 (−0.4) | 38.0 (3.3) | 43.2 (6.2) | 51.9 (11.1) | 63.5 (17.5) | 64.8 (18.2) | 62.6 (17.0) | 57.3 (14.1) | 47.0 (8.3) | 37.8 (3.2) | 29.9 (−1.2) | 46.5 (8.0) |
| Daily mean °F (°C) | 22.9 (−5.1) | 23.2 (−4.9) | 29.0 (−1.7) | 33.8 (1.0) | 42.4 (5.8) | 52.8 (11.6) | 55.2 (12.9) | 53.5 (11.9) | 48.6 (9.2) | 39.2 (4.0) | 30.4 (−0.9) | 22.8 (−5.1) | 37.8 (3.2) |
| Mean daily minimum °F (°C) | 15.6 (−9.1) | 15.0 (−9.4) | 19.9 (−6.7) | 24.4 (−4.2) | 32.9 (0.5) | 42.1 (5.6) | 45.5 (7.5) | 44.5 (6.9) | 40.0 (4.4) | 31.4 (−0.3) | 23.0 (−5.0) | 15.8 (−9.0) | 29.2 (−1.6) |
| Mean minimum °F (°C) | −0.3 (−17.9) | −1.0 (−18.3) | 3.5 (−15.8) | 10.1 (−12.2) | 19.3 (−7.1) | 32.0 (0.0) | 40.8 (4.9) | 39.5 (4.2) | 31.0 (−0.6) | 15.3 (−9.3) | 4.0 (−15.6) | −2.8 (−19.3) | −6.0 (−21.1) |
| Record low °F (°C) | −15 (−26) | −18 (−28) | −15 (−26) | 2 (−17) | 10 (−12) | 21 (−6) | 36 (2) | 33 (1) | 22 (−6) | 2 (−17) | −10 (−23) | −20 (−29) | −20 (−29) |
| Average precipitation inches (mm) | 3.00 (76) | 2.83 (72) | 3.15 (80) | 2.80 (71) | 1.90 (48) | 1.28 (33) | 4.45 (113) | 4.36 (111) | 2.38 (60) | 2.54 (65) | 2.64 (67) | 2.83 (72) | 34.16 (868) |
Source 1: XMACIS2
Source 2: NOAA (Precipitation)

== Fish species ==
- Rainbow trout
- Brown trout
- Crappie
- Sunfish
- Catfish (Channel)
- Yellow perch
