= Ekaterina (disambiguation) =

Ekaterina is a feminine given name.

Ekaterina may also refer to:

- Ekaterina (novel), a 1993 novel by Donald Harington
- Ekaterina (TV series), a 2014 Russian historical television series
- 6955 Ekaterina, a minor planet
