= Santa Fe River watershed =

Ephemeral streams in Santa Fe, New Mexico

The Santa Fe River watershed in New Mexico includes the Santa Fe River, a network of arroyos, and the aquifer they supply through infiltration. The river is fed by an extensive network of tributary arroyos, which define much of the landscape of Santa Fe and surrounding areas.

Besides drainage, the arroyos provide a network of pathways for recreation and exercise when they are dry. Health of the hydrologic basin and associated habitats within the local ecosystem is promoted by the Santa Fe Watershed Association.

== Upper watershed ==
The upper watershed including Santa Fe Lake is protected from human-caused erosion by hiking restrictions.

== Middle watershed ==
Significant arroyos include Arroyo de los Chamisos (named after the Ericameria growing there, see Arroyo de los Chamisos Trail; also called simply Arroyo Chamiso), Arroyo Hondo, Arroyo de la Piedra, Arroyo de los Pinos, Canada Ancha, Arroyo Barranca, Arroyo Rosario, Arroyo Mascaras, Arroyo en Medio, Arroyo del Cerro, and Arroyo Saiz.

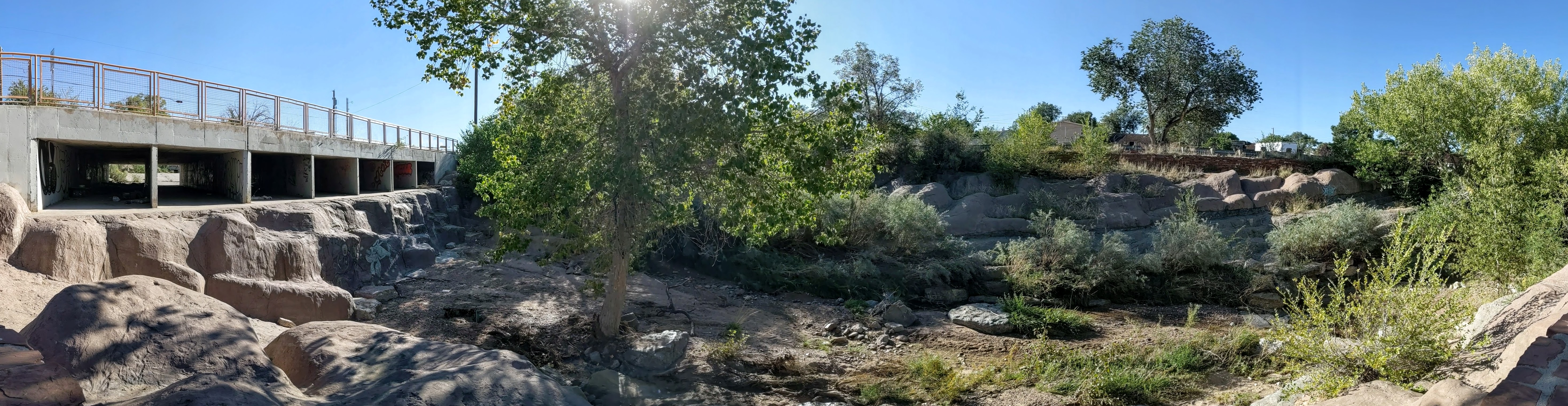
Santa Fe River at confluence with Arroyo Mascaras

== Lower watershed ==
Arroyo Mascaras has tunnels called Heaven and Hell under Paseo de Peralta.

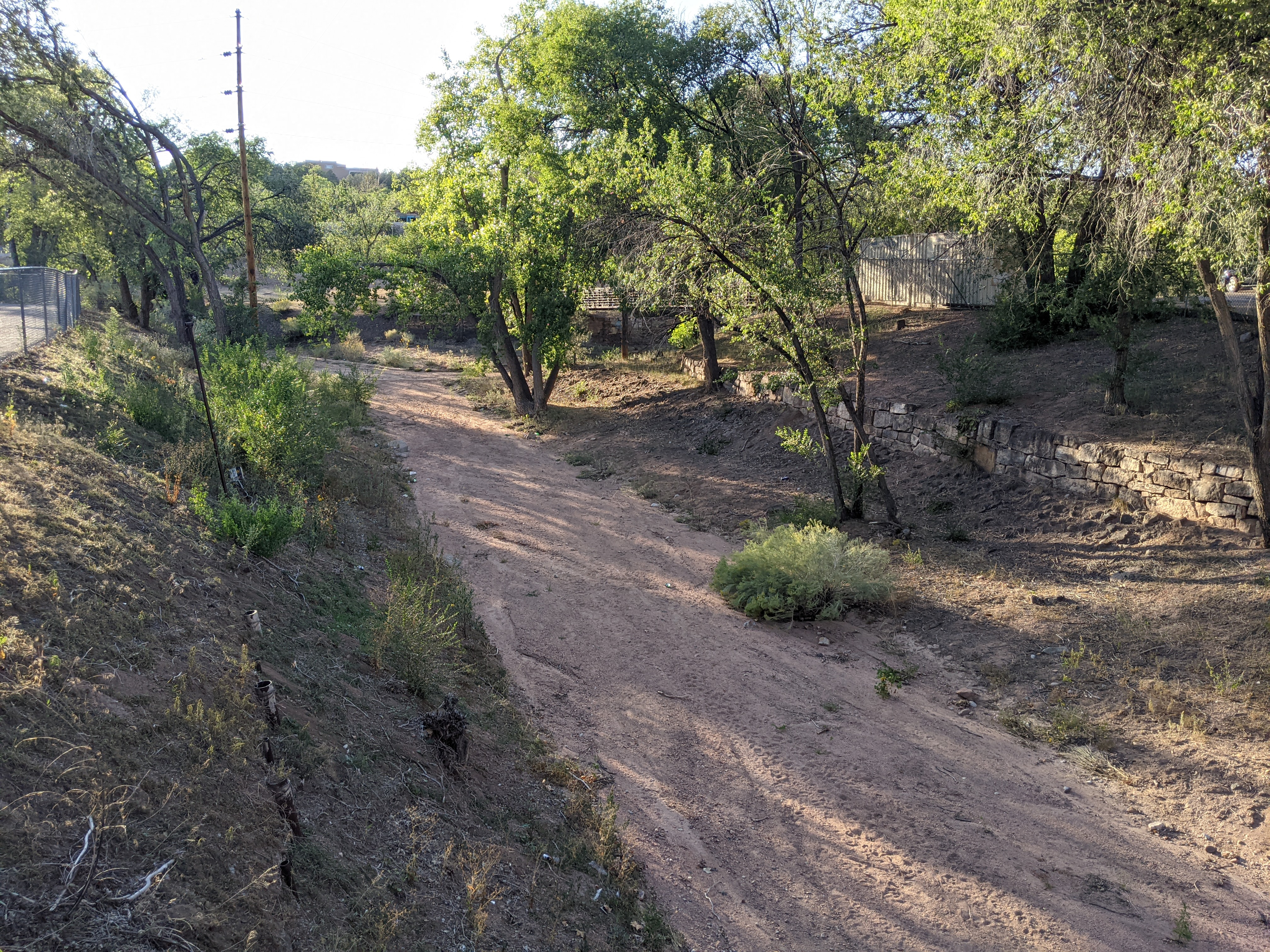
Arroyo de la Piedra at confluence with Arroyo Barranca

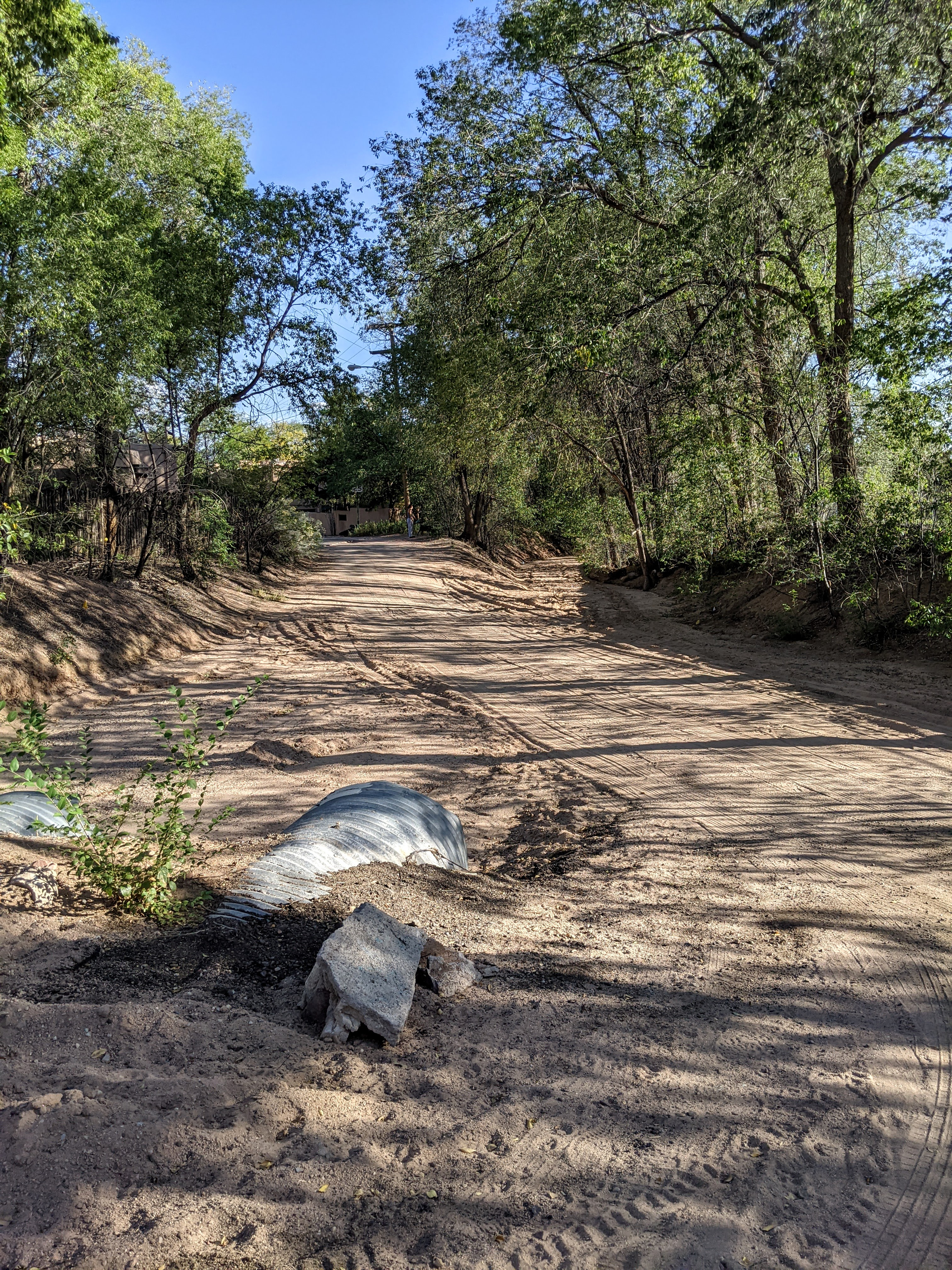
Arroyo Rosario crossing Griffin Street

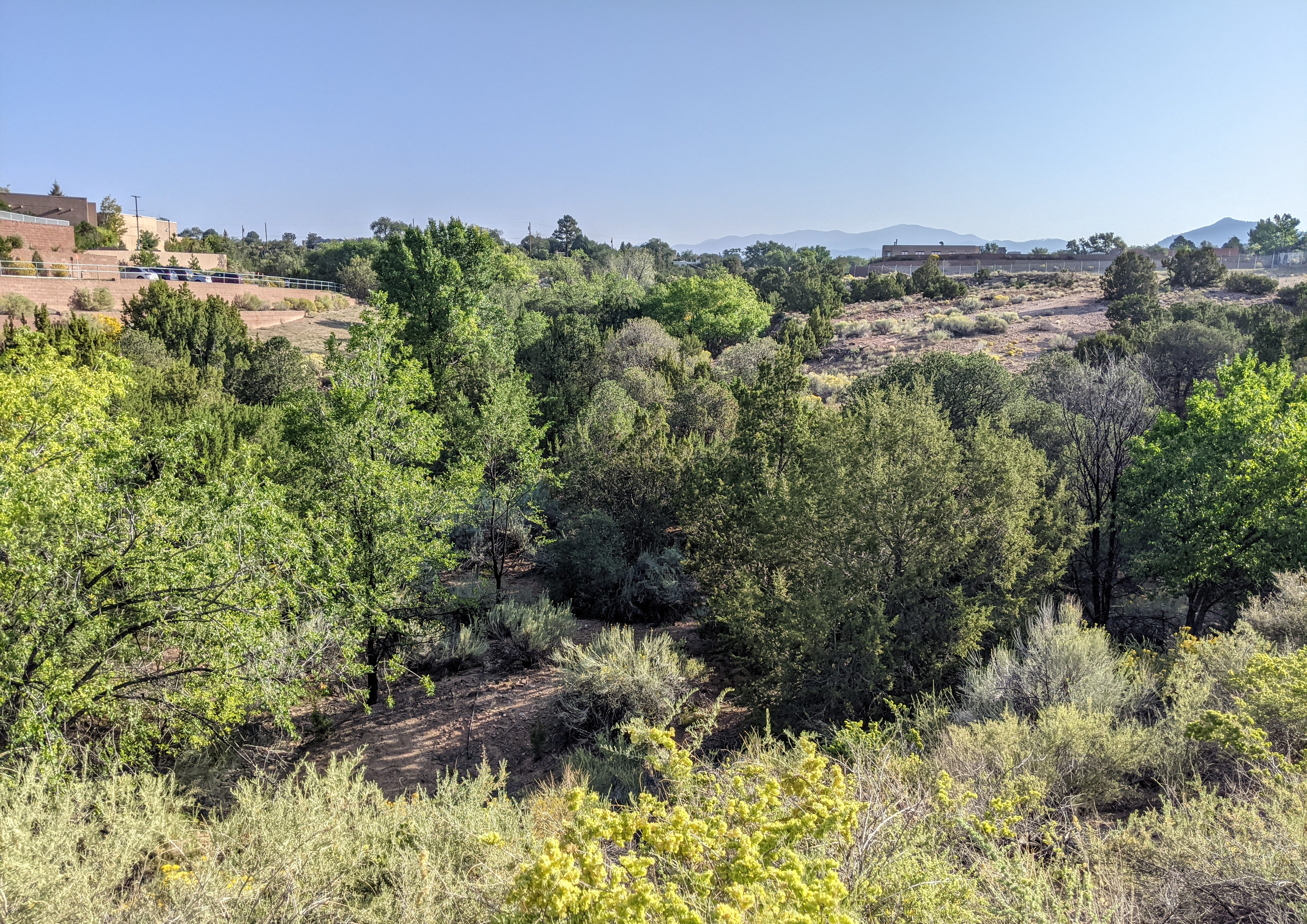
Arroyo de los Chamisos canyon above St. Michaels Drive

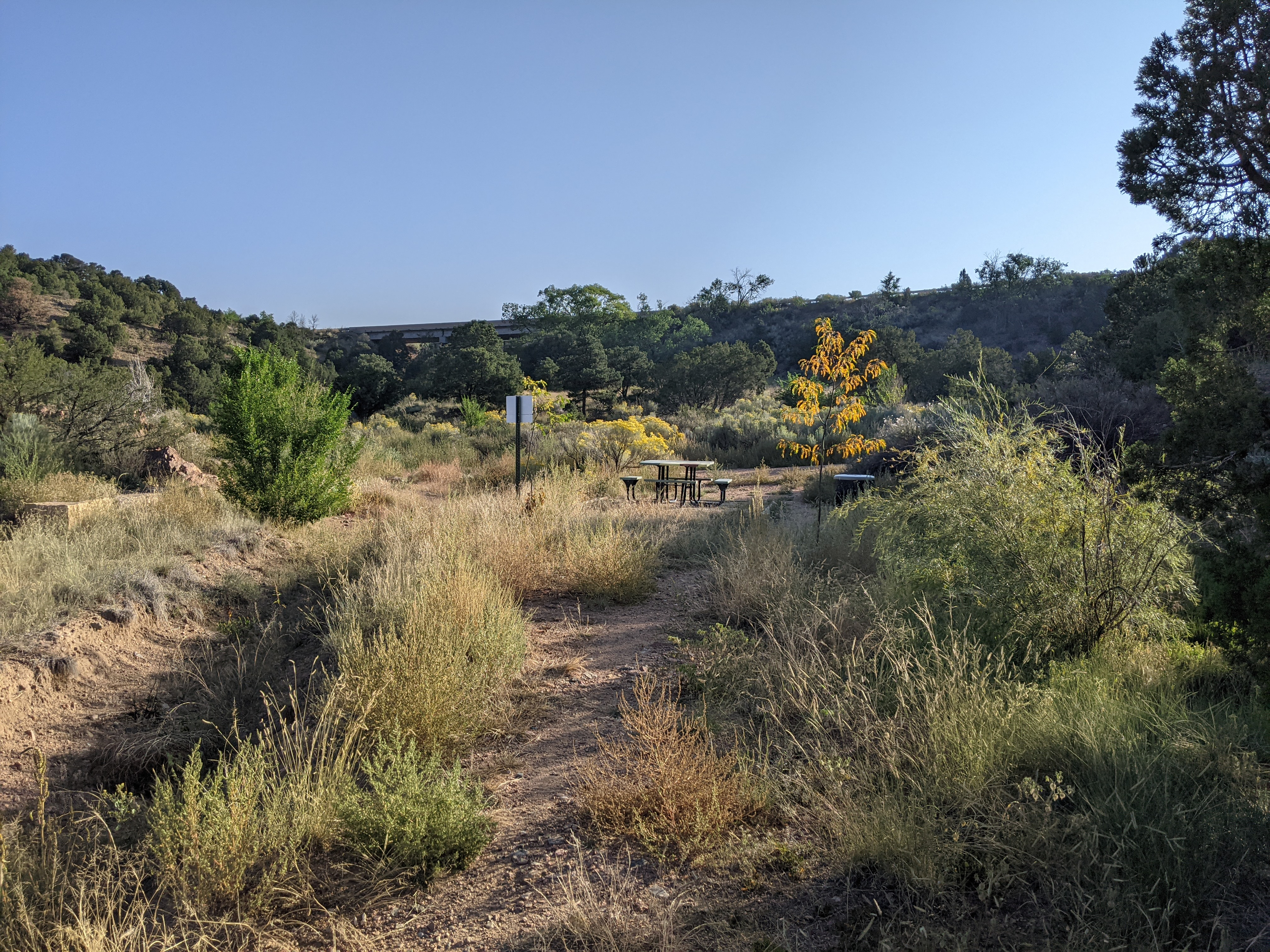
Arroyo Hondo Open Space trail with I-25

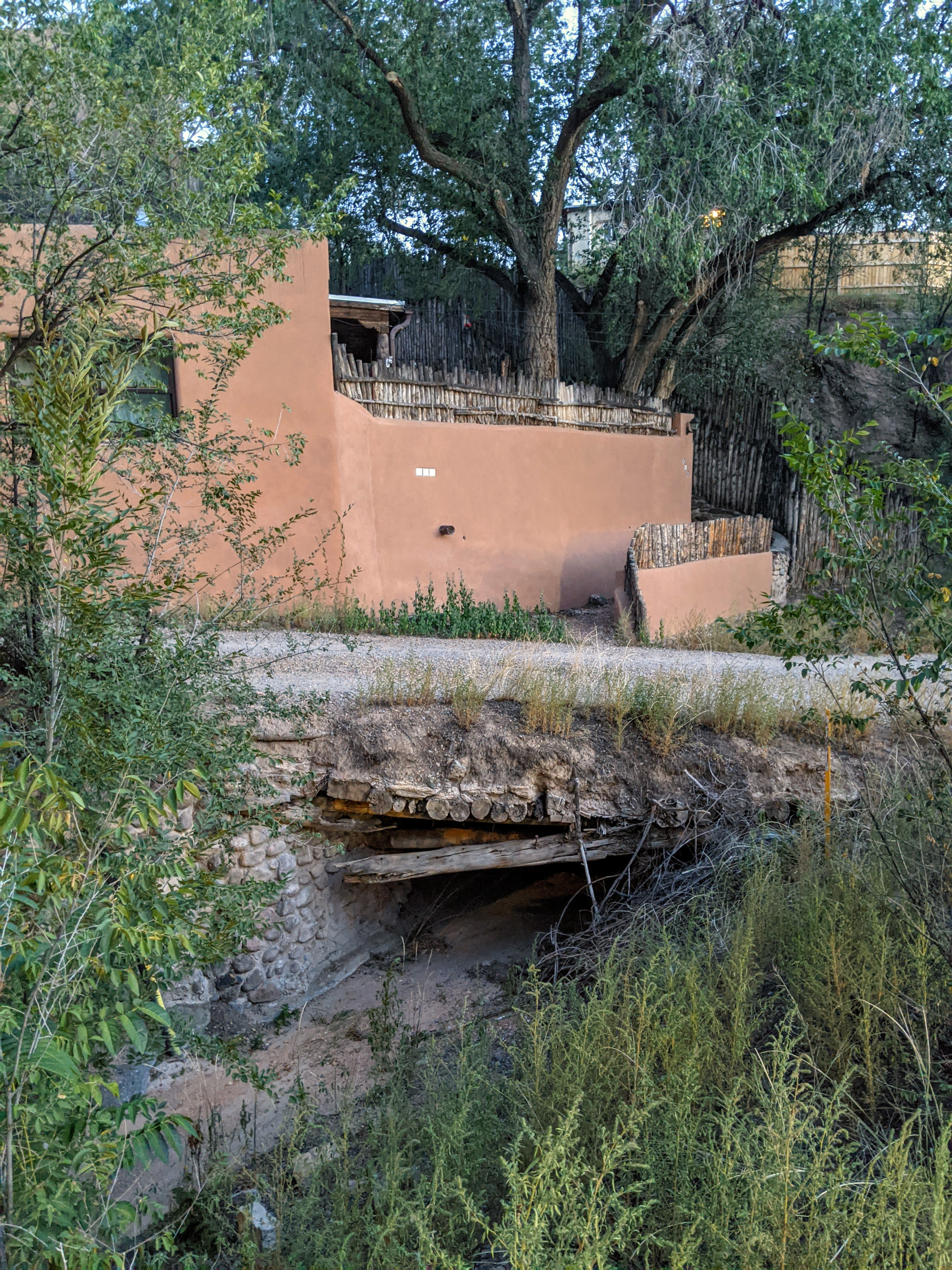
Arroyo Saiz old culvert near end of Armijo Street

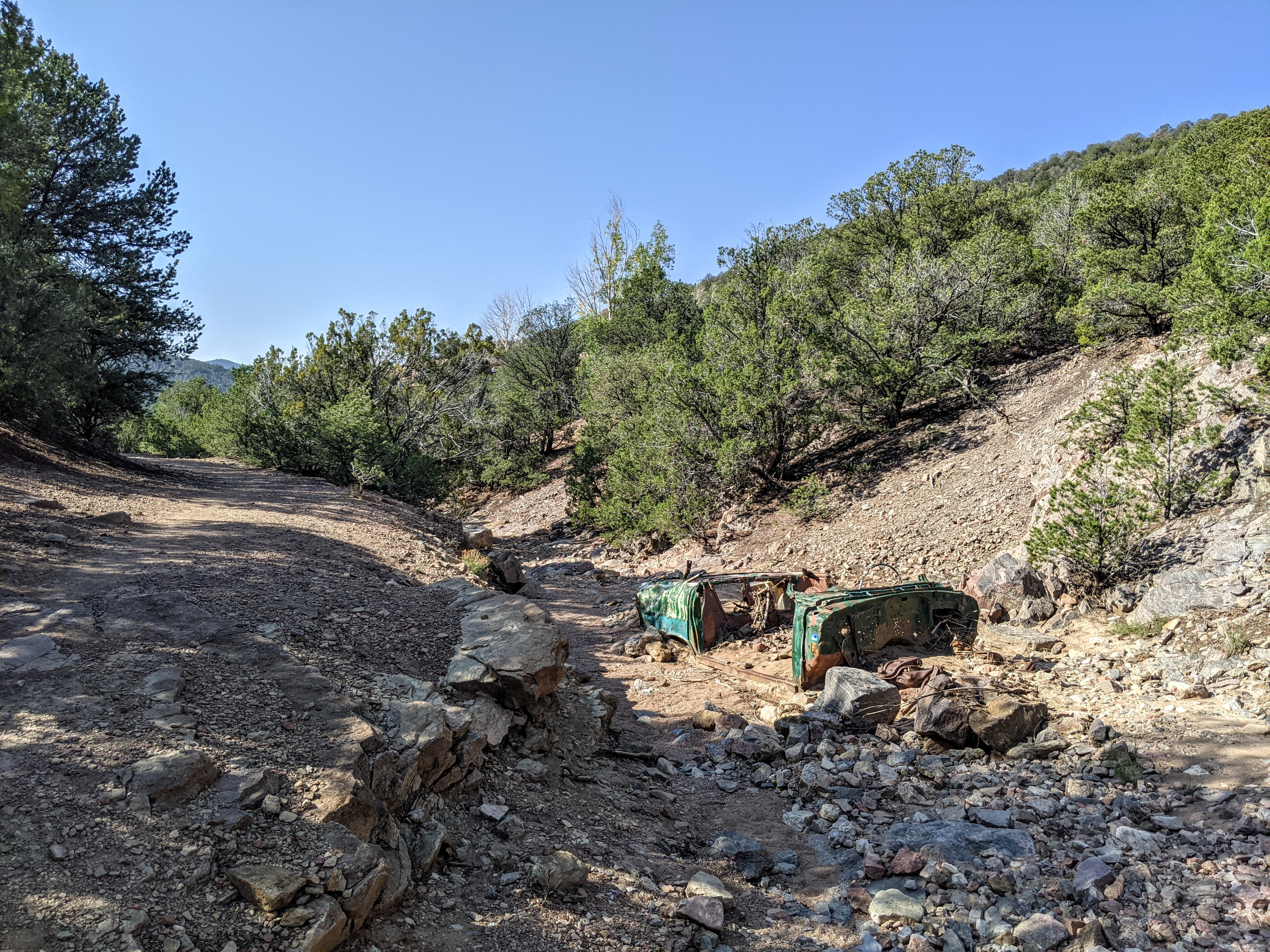
Wrecked car in Arroyo del Cerro

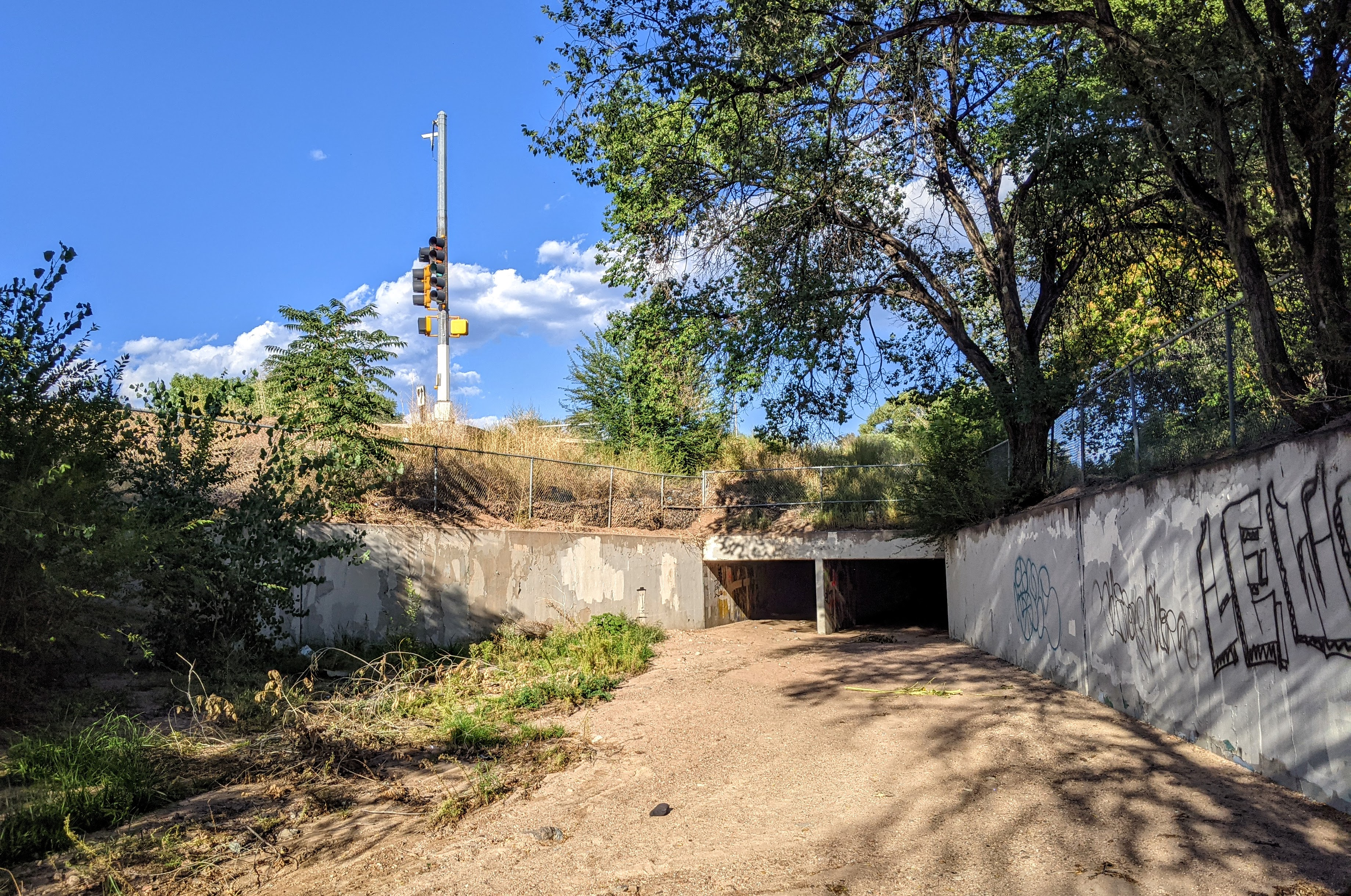
"Heaven and Hell"
