= Catriona (disambiguation) =

Catriona is a Scottish Gaelic given name.

Catriona may also refer to:

- Catriona (novel), by Robert Louis Stevenson
- Catriona (Monarch of the Glen), character in the TV series
- 1116 Catriona, an asteroid
- Catriona (gastropod), a genus of aeolid nudibranchs (sea slugs)
- MV Catriona, a Caledonian MacBrayne ferry
