= Truchas Peak =

Mountain in New Mexico, United States

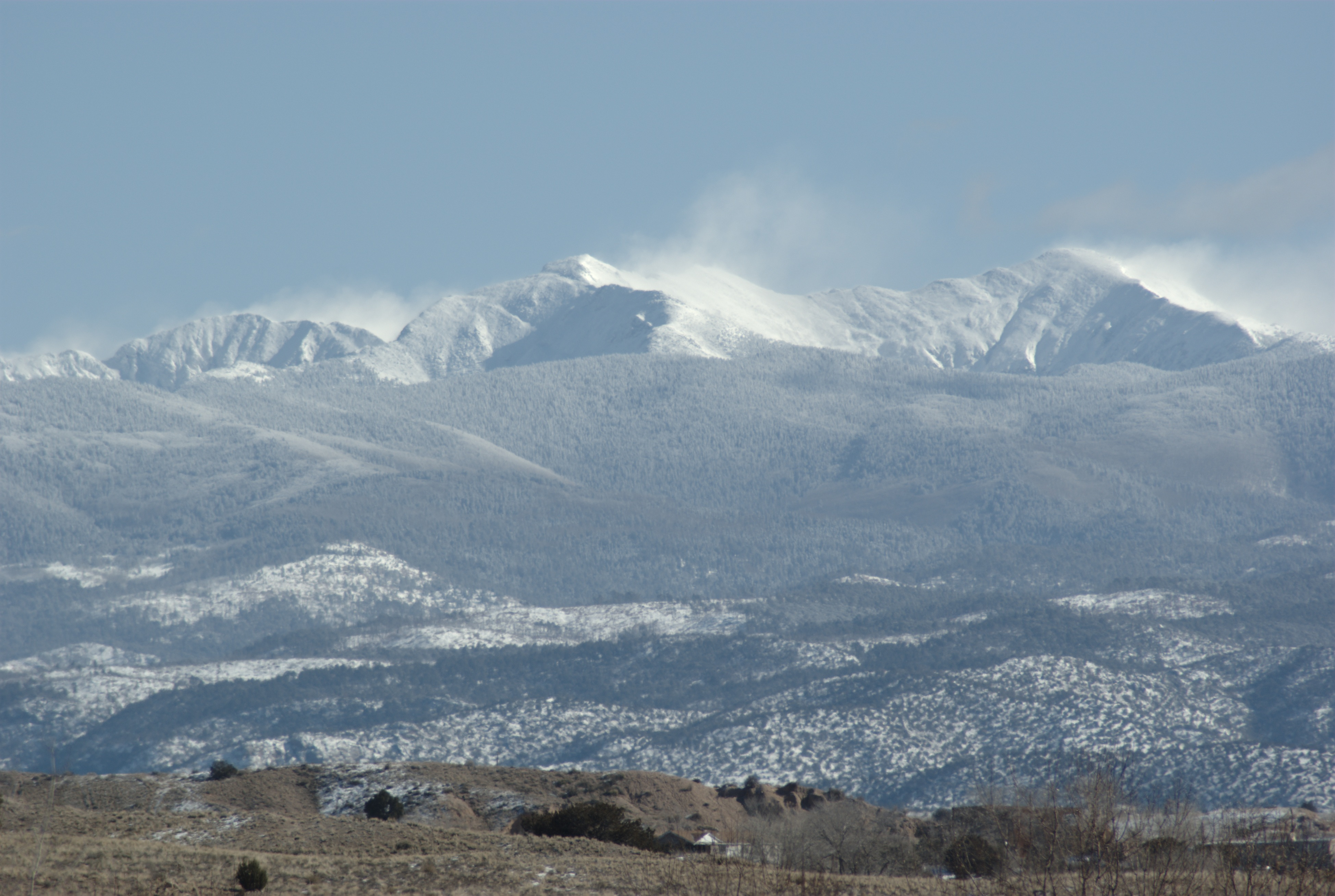
- Truchas Peaks from Española in winter

Highest point
- Elevation: 13,108 ft (3,995 m) NAVD 88
- Prominence: 4,001 ft (1,220 m)
- Coordinates: 35°57′45″N 105°38′42″W

Geography
- Location: Rio Arriba / Mora counties, New Mexico, U.S.
- Parent range: Sangre de Cristo Mountains
- Topo map: USGS Truchas Peak

Climbing
- Easiest route: Scramble, class 2

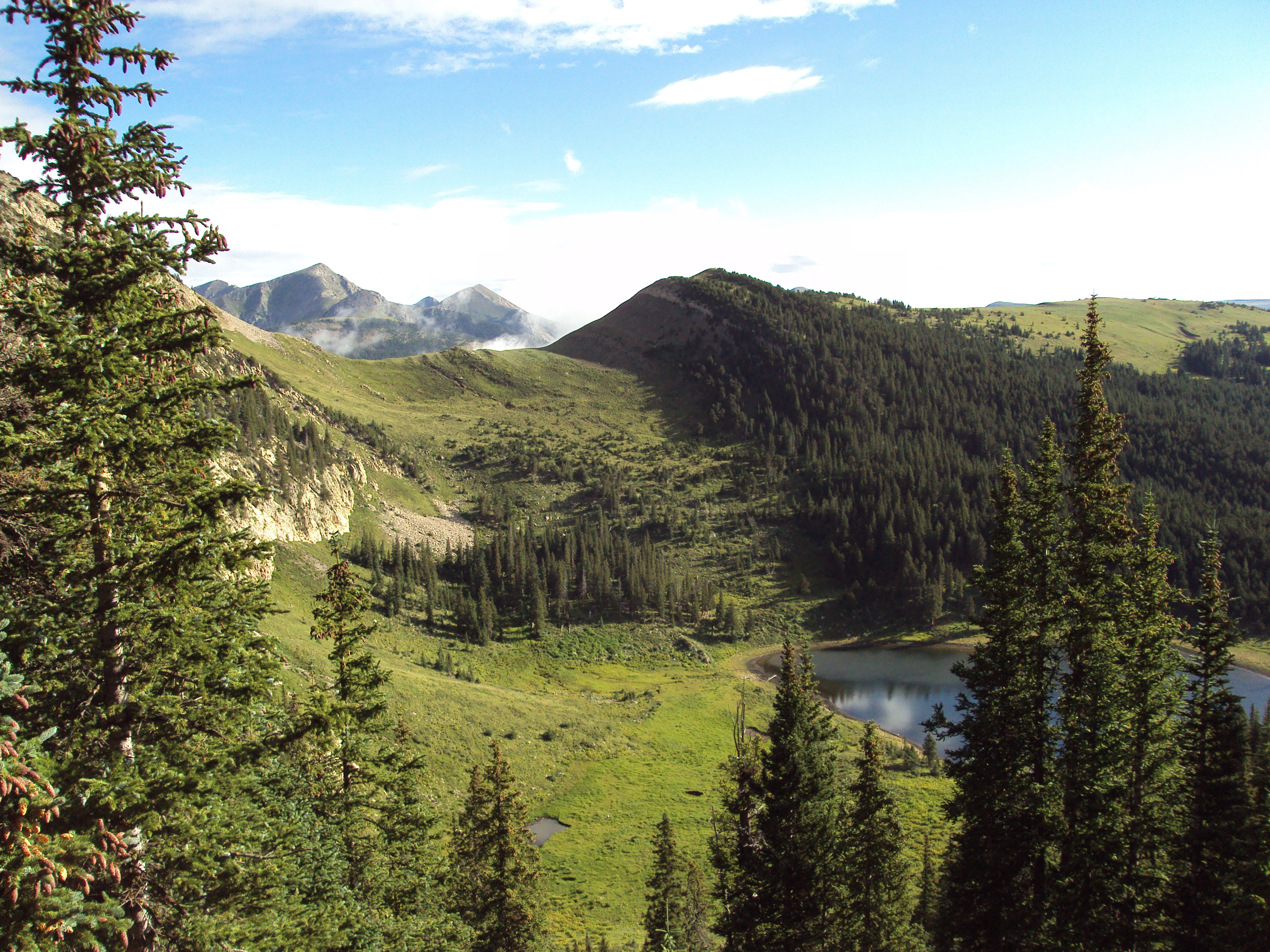
Pecos Baldy Lake with Truchas Peaks in Background

Truchas Peak (Note: /ˈtruːtʃəs/ TROO-chəs) (more precisely, South Truchas Peak; Tewa: Kʼuseˀ Pʼin, pronounced [kʼùsèʔ pʼìŋ], lit. 'rock-horn mountain') is the second highest peak in the U.S. State of New Mexico behind Wheeler Peak. It is in the Sangre de Cristo Mountains 26 miles (42 km) northeast of Santa Fe. It lies within the Pecos Wilderness, part of the Santa Fe National Forest. (The north end of the mountain borders on the Carson National Forest.) The name of the peak is Spanish for "trout" (plural). It is the highest point in both Rio Arriba and Mora counties. It is also the most southerly peak and land area in the continental United States to rise above 13,000 feet (3,962 m).

The entire mountain is a small north-south trending massif with four identifiable summits, North Truchas Peak, Middle Truchas Peak, "Medio Truchas Peak" (unofficial name), and South Truchas Peak, the highest. Of the three subsidiary summits, only North Truchas Peak (13,025 feet or 3,970 meters) has enough topographic prominence (about 624 feet or 190 meters) to be considered an independent peak.

The Truchas Peaks lie on the divide between the Rio Grande and the Pecos River. They are drained on the west by the Rio Medio, the Rio Quemado, and the Rio de las Trampas; on the northeast by the Rio Santa Barbara; and on the southeast by small creeks that quickly run into the upper reaches of the Pecos River. The massif also connects to numerous other high peaks in the region, many via the Santa Barbara Divide, a major east-west high ridge which separates the Pecos watershed on the south from the Santa Barbara watershed to the north.

The Truchas group has a true wilderness character, as it is difficult to access the peaks within a single day. Many trails access the slopes of the peaks, most notably the Skyline Trail (Trail number 251), which traverses the eastern slopes at elevation around 12,000 feet (3,660 m) and accesses the Truchas Lakes, a set of small lakes in a cirque below the south side of North Truchas Peak.

== Climate ==
Climate data for Truchas Peak 35.9683 N, 105.6411 W, Elevation: 12,418 ft (3,785 m) (1991–2020 normals)
Month	Jan	Feb	Mar	Apr	May	Jun	Jul	Aug	Sep	Oct	Nov	Dec	Year
Mean daily maximum °F (°C)	27.8 (−2.3)	28.6 (−1.9)	34.0 (1.1)	39.7 (4.3)	48.2 (9.0)	59.6 (15.3)	62.1 (16.7)	59.7 (15.4)	54.6 (12.6)	45.0 (7.2)	35.2 (1.8)	27.9 (−2.3)	43.5 (6.4)
Daily mean °F (°C)	18.2 (−7.7)	18.4 (−7.6)	23.3 (−4.8)	28.3 (−2.1)	36.8 (2.7)	47.1 (8.4)	50.4 (10.2)	48.9 (9.4)	44.0 (6.7)	34.8 (1.6)	25.7 (−3.5)	18.5 (−7.5)	32.9 (0.5)
Mean daily minimum °F (°C)	8.5 (−13.1)	8.2 (−13.2)	12.5 (−10.8)	17.0 (−8.3)	25.5 (−3.6)	34.7 (1.5)	38.8 (3.8)	38.0 (3.3)	33.4 (0.8)	24.7 (−4.1)	16.2 (−8.8)	9.0 (−12.8)	22.2 (−5.4)
Average precipitation inches (mm)	3.67 (93)	3.58 (91)	3.90 (99)	4.62 (117)	2.63 (67)	1.59 (40)	4.72 (120)	5.28 (134)	2.73 (69)	2.84 (72)	4.01 (102)	3.85 (98)	43.42 (1,102)
Source: PRISM Climate Group

Climate data for Jicarita Peak 36.0515 N, 105.5510 W, Elevation: 12,530 ft (3,820 m) (1991–2020 normals)
Month	Jan	Feb	Mar	Apr	May	Jun	Jul	Aug	Sep	Oct	Nov	Dec	Year
Mean daily maximum °F (°C)	28.7 (−1.8)	29.2 (−1.6)	34.1 (1.2)	39.1 (3.9)	47.6 (8.7)	59.0 (15.0)	61.5 (16.4)	59.1 (15.1)	54.1 (12.3)	44.5 (6.9)	35.8 (2.1)	29.1 (−1.6)	43.5 (6.4)
Daily mean °F (°C)	17.8 (−7.9)	18.0 (−7.8)	22.6 (−5.2)	27.4 (−2.6)	35.9 (2.2)	46.2 (7.9)	49.5 (9.7)	47.9 (8.8)	43.0 (6.1)	33.9 (1.1)	25.2 (−3.8)	18.3 (−7.6)	32.1 (0.1)
Mean daily minimum °F (°C)	7.0 (−13.9)	6.7 (−14.1)	11.2 (−11.6)	15.7 (−9.1)	24.2 (−4.3)	33.5 (0.8)	37.5 (3.1)	36.7 (2.6)	32.0 (0.0)	23.2 (−4.9)	14.6 (−9.7)	7.5 (−13.6)	20.8 (−6.2)
Average precipitation inches (mm)	3.59 (91)	3.41 (87)	3.73 (95)	4.06 (103)	2.28 (58)	1.87 (47)	4.97 (126)	4.91 (125)	2.42 (61)	2.80 (71)	3.79 (96)	3.63 (92)	41.46 (1,052)
Source: PRISM Climate Group

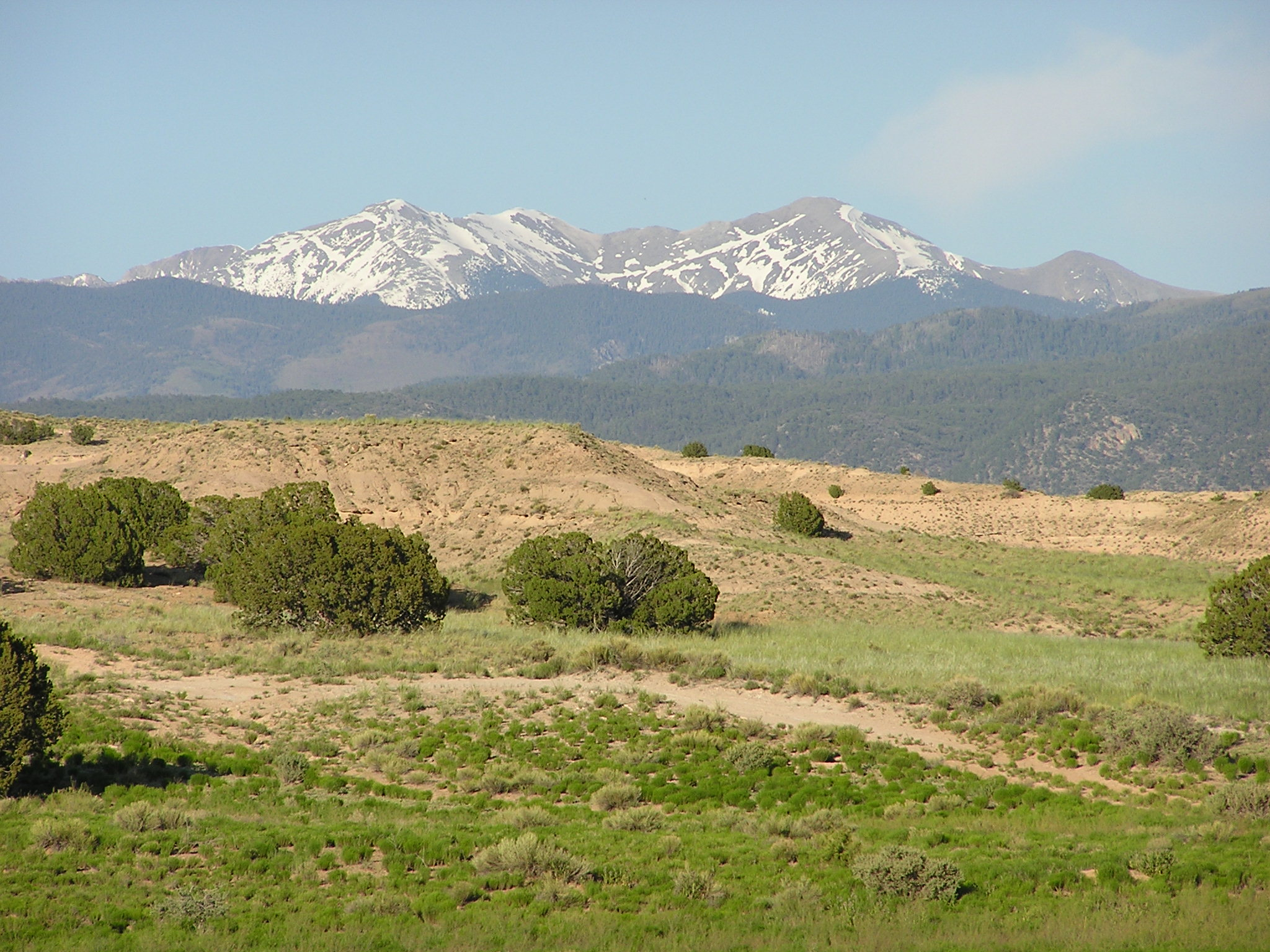
Truchas Peaks from US Highways 84/285, just north of Pojoaque

== See also ==
- Mountain peaks of North America
- Mountain peaks of the Rocky Mountains
- Mountain peaks of the United States
- Southern Rocky Mountains
