= List of storms named Katherine =

The name Katherine has been used for two tropical cyclones in the East Pacific Ocean:

- Tropical Storm Jennifer–Katherine (1963) – originally considered two separate storms
- Hurricane Katherine (1973) – a Category 2 hurricane

== See also ==
- Hurricane Catarina (2004) – a South Atlantic tropical cyclone with a similar name
- Storm Ciril (2022) – a European windstorm that was named Katharina by the Free University of Berlin
