= Catherine Creek (Kettle River tributary) =

Stream in Washington, U.S.

Coordinates: 48°58′29″N 118°46′00″W

Catherine Creek is a stream in the U.S. state of Washington. It is a tributary of the Kettle River.

Catherine Creek was named after Catherine Alec, wife of Martin Alec of Ferry, Washington.

== See also ==
- List of rivers of Washington (state)
