= Saint Catherine's Monastery (disambiguation) =

Saint Catherine's Monastery is the world's oldest continuously-inhabited Christian monastery, at Mount Sinai, Egypt.

Saint Catherine's Monastery may also refer to:

- Church and Monastery of St Catherine, Valletta, in Valletta, Malta
- St. Catherine's Monastery, Tallinn, a former monastery in Tallinn, Estonia

== See also ==
- St. Catherine (disambiguation)
