= Lake Kathryn (Idaho) =

Lake in Custer County, Idaho

- Location within Idaho Location within the United States
- Location: Custer County, Idaho
- Coordinates: 44°02′21″N 115°02′11″W
- Type: Glacial
- Primary outflows: Creek to Redfish Lake Creek to Salmon River
- Basin countries: United States
- Max. length: 0.34 mi (0.55 km)
- Max. width: 0.22 mi (0.35 km)
- Surface elevation: 9,010 ft (2,750 m)
- Islands: 1

Lake Kathryn is an alpine lake in Custer County, Idaho, United States, located in the Sawtooth Mountains in the Sawtooth National Recreation Area. There are no trails that lead to Lake Kathryn, although it is most easily accessed from Sawtooth National Forest trail 154 along Redfish Lake Creek.

Lake Kathryn is in the Sawtooth Wilderness, and a wilderness permit can be obtained at a registration box at trailheads or wilderness boundaries. Just to the north of Lake Kathryn are the Upper Redfish Lakes.

Lake Kathryn is named after Kathryn Mills.

== See also ==
- List of lakes of the Sawtooth Mountains (Idaho)
- Sawtooth National Forest
- Sawtooth National Recreation Area
- Sawtooth Range (Idaho)
