= Catherine (1811 ship) =

British convict transport and whaling ship

History

United Kingdom
- Name: Catherine
- Owner: S. Russell (1811-1813); Daniel Bennett (1813-1833)
- Launched: 1811, New Bedford
- Fate: Last listed in Lloyd's Register 1834

General characteristics
- Tons burthen: 304, or 325 (bm)
- Propulsion: Sail
- Armament: 8 (or 10) × 6-pounder guns (wartime)
- Notes: Two decks and three masts

Catherine (or Catherina), was a whaler, launched in 1811 at New Bedford, that also made one voyage transporting convicts from England to New South Wales in 1813. She made seven whaling voyages between 1813 and 1831.

== Career ==
Between 1811 or so and 1813 Catherine was under the command of Captain J. Clark. Initially she may have traded between Cork and Archangel.

Year	Master	Owner	Trade	Source
1813	J.Clark; W.Simmond	S.Russell; Bennett	Archangel–Cork	Lloyd's Register

=== Convict transport ===
Under the command of William Simmonds, Catherine sailed from Falmouth, England, on 8 December 1813, and arrived at Port Jackson on 4 May 1814. She carried 98 female convicts, one of whom died on the voyage.

=== Whaling ===
Catherine left Port Jackson on 13 July bound for the whale fisheries around New Zealand.

Captain Simmons died three days after leaving Port Jackson; Robert Graham replaced him as master. In 1814 Catherine was recorded as being at the Bay of Islands, New Zealand. Catherine returned to Britain on 15 June in 1816.

Catherine was still under Robert Graham's command when she returned to the whale fisheries around New Zealand in 1816. Catherine returned to England on 20 May 1819.

Catherine's third whaling voyage began on 22 July 1819. Her destination was the Galapagos Islands, but it is unclear who her master was. (Lloyd's Register has this name as "Grayham".) On 16 March 1821 she was on the New South Wales fishery with 800 barrels. On 21 December she was off New Zealand. She returned to Britain on 31 May 1822 with 420 casks.

Year	Master	Owner	Trade	Source
1822	Graham; Younger	Bennett	London–South Seas	Register of Shipping

For her fourth whaling voyage, Catherine's master was Younger (or Young), though T. Prescott would succeed him. She left Britain on 9 August 1822 with destination Timor. She was reported to be at Timor on 20 December, and at Guam on 28 September 1823 with 1120 barrels. In December she was at Moraty (possibly Morotai), with 1200 barrels. She returned to Britain on 30 September 1824 with 600 casks, seven tanks, and fins (baleen).

On her fifth voyage, Catherine left Britain on 26 November 1824 with Ford, master, and destination again Timor. On 27 March 1824 she was at Timor with 80 barrels. She returned to Britain on 2 October 1826 with 350 casks and five tanks.

Ford (or Foord) was still her master for Catherine's sixth voyage when she left on 30 March 1827 with destination Seychelles. She was reported there on 9 September 1828 with 1400 barrels. She returned to Britain on 4 April 1829 with 450 casks.

For her last recorded whaling voyage Catherine left Britain on 7 July 1829 with R. (or H.) Price, master. In September she was at Timor with 180 barrels. She then was reported on 10 May 1831 at San Francisco with 1100 barrels. She returned to Britain on 19 September 1831 with 1100 barrels of sperm oil, and possibly other cargo as well.

The entry in Lloyd's Register for Catherine, Price, master, Bennett, owner, New Bedford-built, 325 tons, trade London-South Seas continued unchanged in 1832 and 1833. She was no longer listed in 1834.
