= Santa Fe Baldy =

Mountain in New Mexico, United States

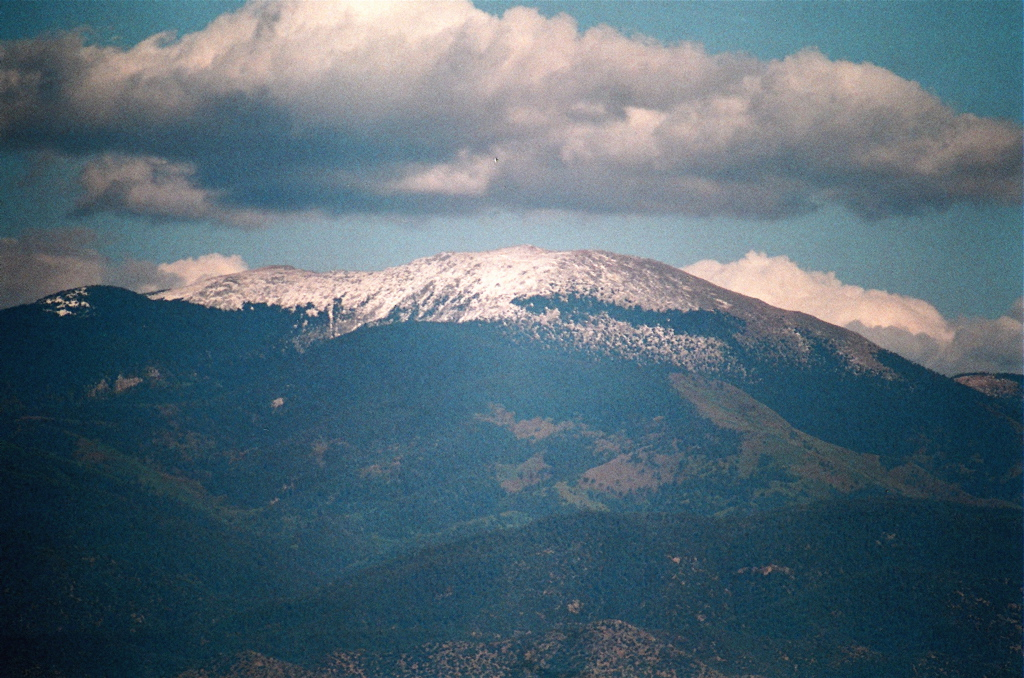
- From the White Rock, overlook

Highest point
- Elevation: 12,632 ft (3,850 m) NAVD 88
- Prominence: 1,982 ft (604 m)
- Parent peak: Truchas Peak
- Coordinates: 35°49′56″N 105°45′29″W

Geography
- Location: Santa Fe County, New Mexico, U.S.
- Parent range: Sangre de Cristo Mountains
- Topo map: USGS Aspen Basin

Climbing
- Easiest route: Off-trail hike

Santa Fe Baldy (Tewa: Póvi Pʼin, pronounced [póvì pʼìŋ], lit. 'flower mountain') is a prominent summit in the Sangre de Cristo Mountains of New Mexico, United States, located 15 mi (24 km) northeast of Santa Fe. There are no higher mountains in New Mexico south of Santa Fe Baldy. It is prominent as seen from Los Alamos and communities along the Rio Grande in northern New Mexico, but is relatively inconspicuous from Santa Fe, as its north-south trending main ridge line is seen nearly end-on, disguising the size of the mountain. Tree line in the Sangre de Cristos is unusually high (exceeding 12,000 feet (3,700 m) in places) and only the top 600 to 800 feet (180 to 240 m) of the mountain is perpetually free of trees, but several severe forest fires have created bare spots extending to lower elevations. An extensive region of aspen trees on its flanks produces spectacular orange-yellow coloration during the fall that is the subject of many photographic studies.

Santa Fe Baldy rises in the Pecos Wilderness within the Santa Fe National Forest, on the water divide between the Rio Grande and the Pecos River. The western slopes are drained by the Rio Capulin and the Rio Nambe, both flowing to the Rio Grande. The eastern side of the mountain consists of two small cirques, one containing Lake Katherine, one of the highest lakes in New Mexico at elevation 11,745 feet (3,580 m). Contrary to popular belief, Lake Katherine was not given its name by theoretical physicist J. Robert Oppenheimer, in reference to his wife Katherine "Kitty" Oppenheimer. This naming convention predates their meeting by at least a decade, and the lake is instead named after Katherine Chaves Page Kavanaugh, owner of the Los Pinos Guest Ranch on the Pecos River. The attribution of the name to J. Robert Oppenheimer is due to his known connection, and admiration, of Katherine Chaves Page Kavanaugh, as he was a frequent guest at the Ranch.

The peak is accessed by Trail 251, the Skyline Trail, which climbs to a saddle about 1,000 feet (300 m) below the summit; the remaining distance is covered by a steep unofficial trail along the ridgeline. Under good conditions the summit is a simple "walk-up" climb, although prone to lightning.

Nearby peaks include Lake Peak, 12,409 feet (3,782 m) and Tesuque Peak, 12,043 feet (3,671 m), both located about 3 miles (4.8 km) to the south of Santa Fe Baldy. Santa Fe Ski Basin is on the western slopes of Tesuque Peak.

On 11 June 2009, Santa Fe Baldy was the scene of a helicopter accident that claimed the lives of New Mexico State Police Sergeant Andrew Tingwall and University of New Mexico graduate student Megumi Yamamoto. The helicopter crashed after Tingwall rescued Yamamoto. Yamamoto had been hiking with her boyfriend, but had become lost.

== Climate ==
Climate data for Santa Fe Baldy 35.8323 N, 105.7583 W, Elevation: 12,172 ft (3,710 m) (1991–2020 normals)
Month	Jan	Feb	Mar	Apr	May	Jun	Jul	Aug	Sep	Oct	Nov	Dec	Year
Mean daily maximum °F (°C)	29.7 (−1.3)	30.5 (−0.8)	35.7 (2.1)	40.7 (4.8)	49.3 (9.6)	61.0 (16.1)	63.1 (17.3)	60.7 (15.9)	55.7 (13.2)	46.1 (7.8)	37.2 (2.9)	29.9 (−1.2)	45.0 (7.2)
Daily mean °F (°C)	19.4 (−7.0)	19.7 (−6.8)	24.4 (−4.2)	29.2 (−1.6)	37.8 (3.2)	48.3 (9.1)	51.2 (10.7)	49.6 (9.8)	44.8 (7.1)	35.6 (2.0)	27.0 (−2.8)	19.8 (−6.8)	33.9 (1.1)
Mean daily minimum °F (°C)	9.1 (−12.7)	8.9 (−12.8)	13.2 (−10.4)	17.7 (−7.9)	26.2 (−3.2)	35.7 (2.1)	39.3 (4.1)	38.5 (3.6)	33.8 (1.0)	25.0 (−3.9)	16.8 (−8.4)	9.8 (−12.3)	22.8 (−5.1)
Average precipitation inches (mm)	3.21 (82)	3.01 (76)	3.36 (85)	3.19 (81)	1.95 (50)	1.91 (49)	4.35 (110)	4.08 (104)	2.94 (75)	2.76 (70)	2.79 (71)	3.39 (86)	36.94 (939)
Source: PRISM Climate Group

== Gallery ==
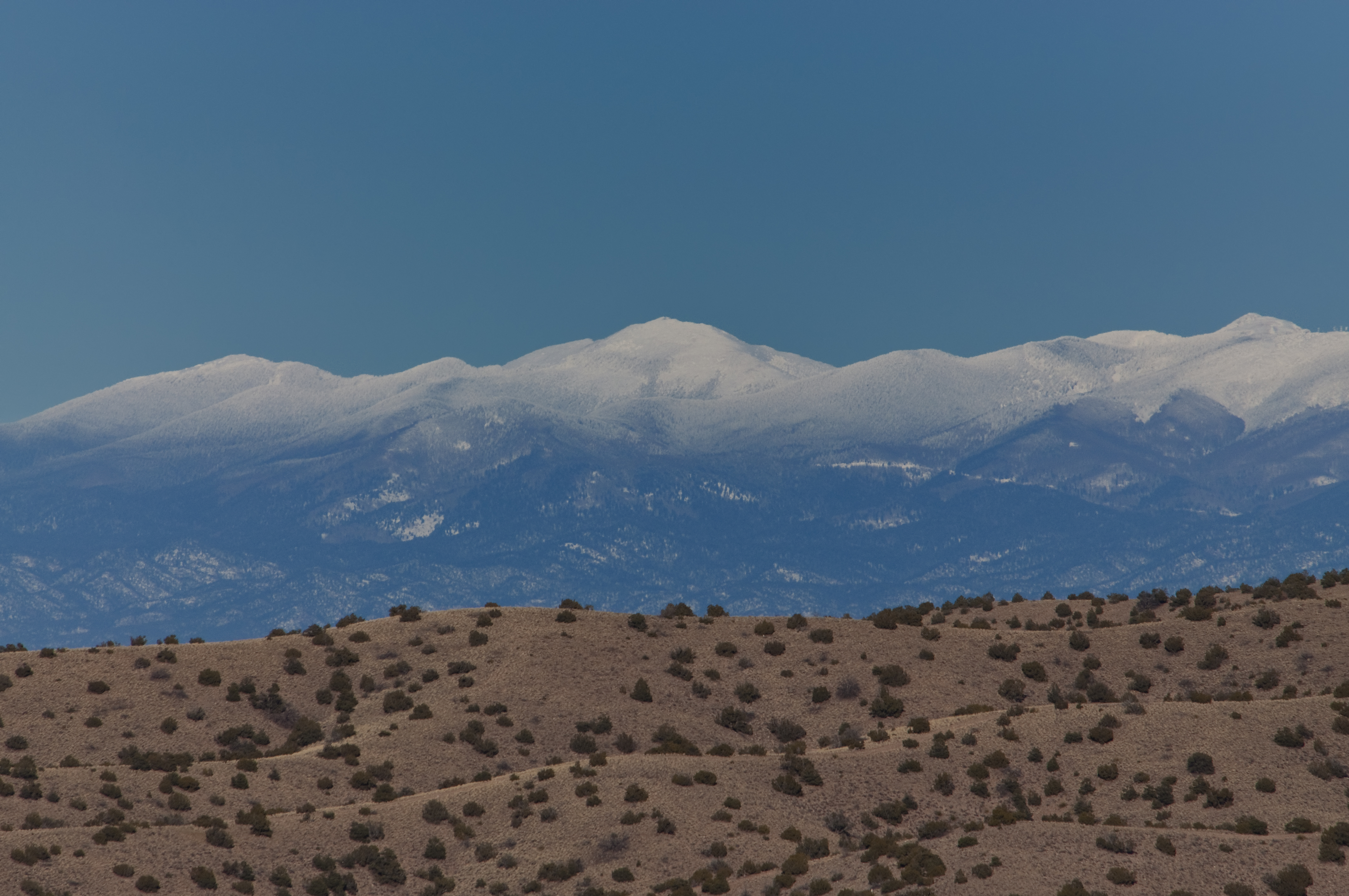
With fresh snow, January 2010

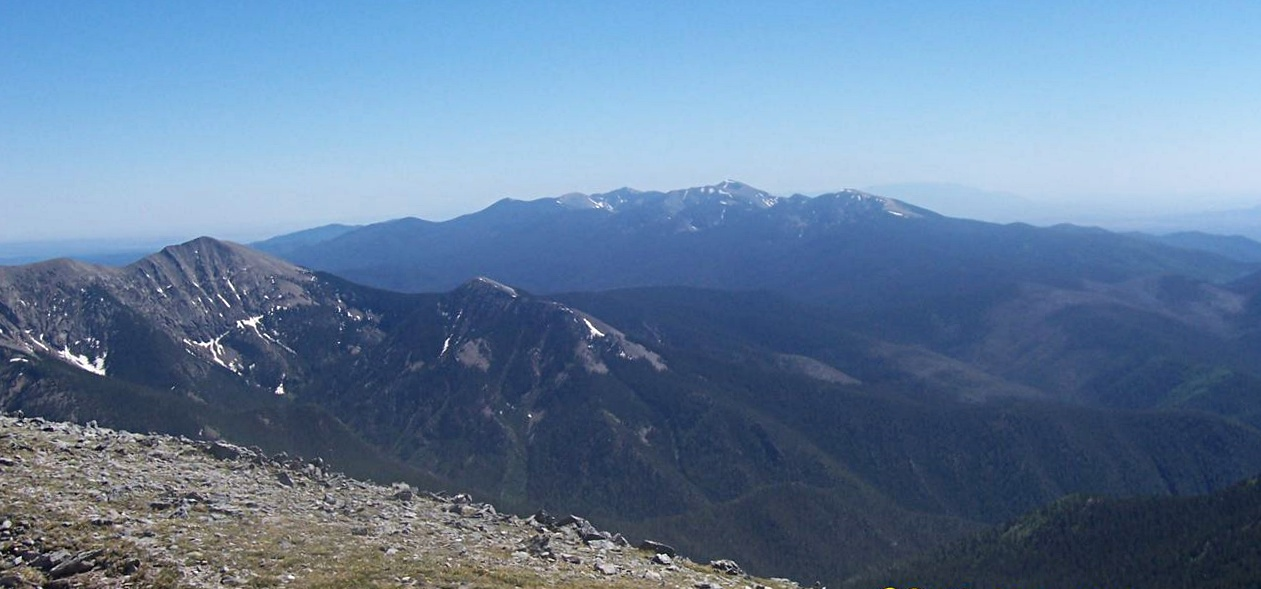
From Truchas Peak, with Pecos Baldy in the foreground

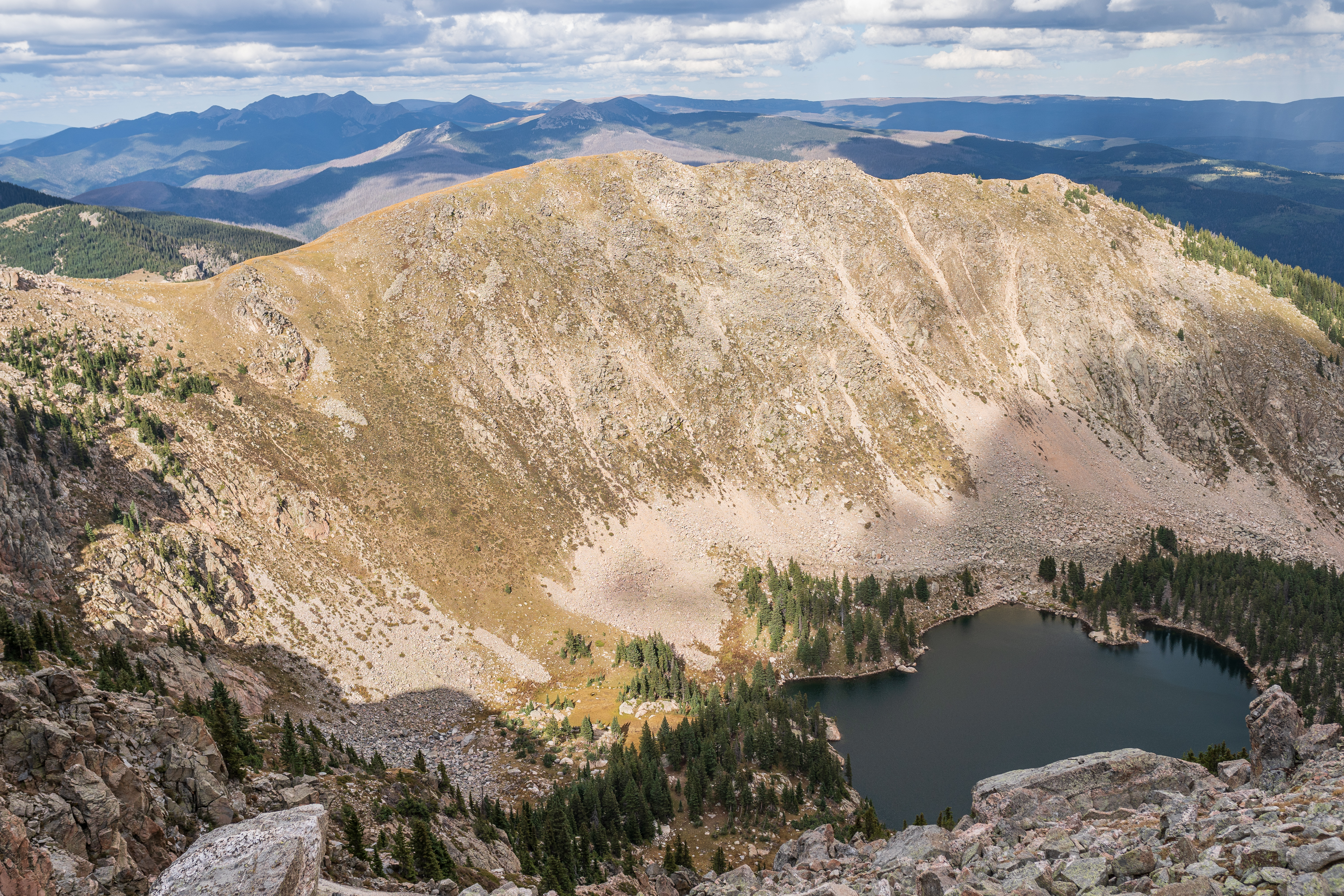
Looking down on Lake Katherine from near the peak of Santa Fe Baldy

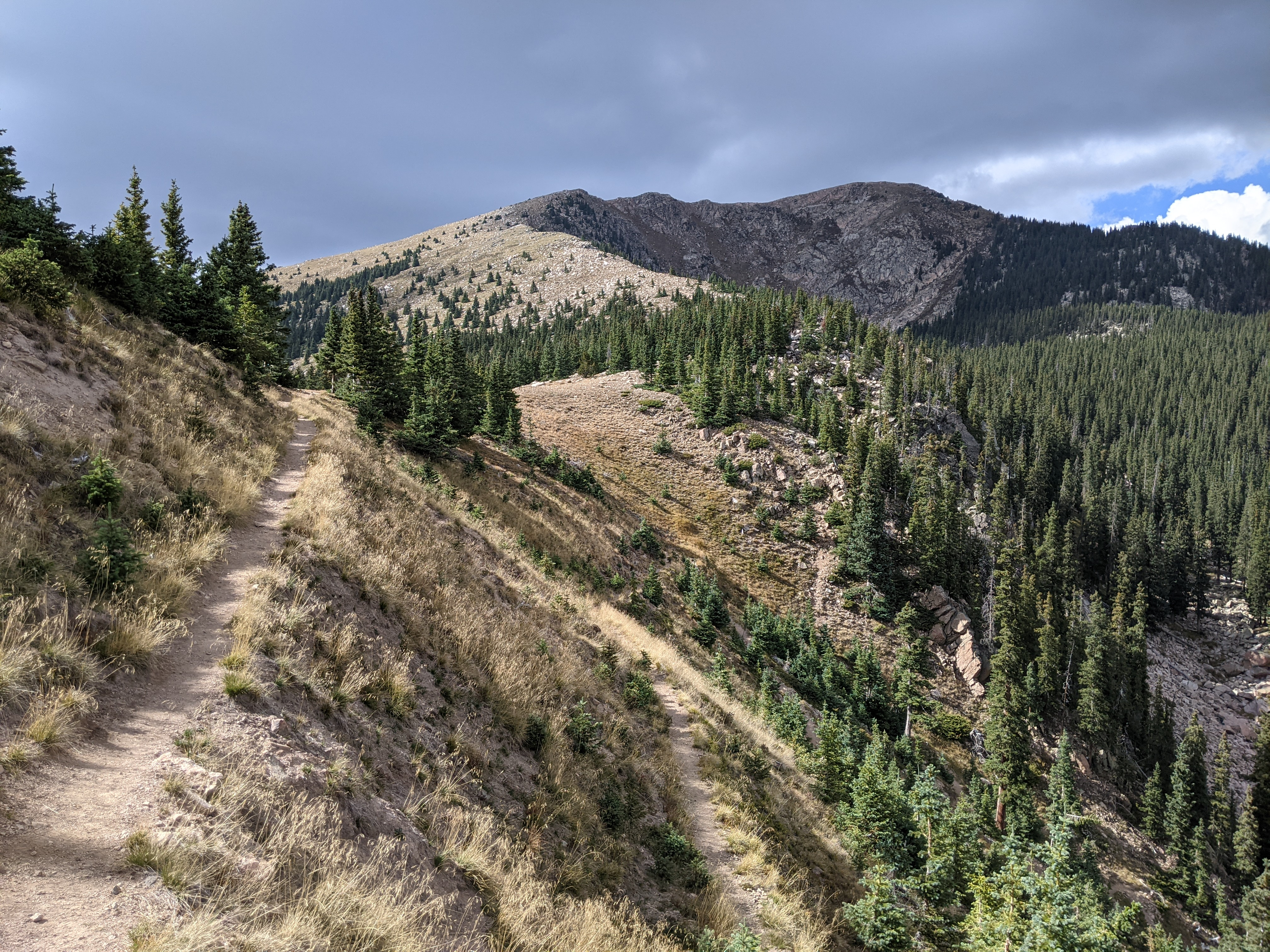
Looking north-northeast from the switch-backed section of the trail to Lake Katherine summit
