= USS Katherine =

Patrol vessel of the United States Navy

History

United States
- Name: USS Katherine (1917-1918); USS SP-715 (1918)
- Namesake: Katherine was her previous name retained; SP-715 was her section patrol number
- Builder: J. T. Sharpley, Greenbackville, Virginia
- Completed: 1907
- Acquired: 18 May 1917
- Commissioned: 26 April 1917
- Decommissioned: 22 October 1918
- Renamed: SP-715 in 1918
- Fate: Returned to owner 22 October 1918
- Notes: Operated as civilian motorboat Katherine 1907-1917 and from 1918

General characteristics
- Type: Patrol vessel
- Tonnage: 5 Gross register tons
- Length: 35 ft (11 m)
- Beam: 9 ft (2.7 m)
- Draft: 2 ft (0.61 m)
- Speed: 7 knots
- Armament: None

USS Katherine (SP-715), later USS SP-715, was a United States Navy patrol vessel in commission from 1917 to 1918.

Katherine was built as a civilian motorboat of the same name in 1907 by J. T. Sharpley at Greenbackville, Virginia. In 1917, the U.S. Navy acquired her under a free lease from her owner, the Virginia Fish and Oyster Commission, for use as a section patrol boat during World War I. She was commissioned as USS Katherine (SP-715) on 26 April 1917, although the Navy did not actually take possession of her until 18 May 1917, when Chief Master-at-Arms C. C. Jones took command of her at Norfolk, Virginia.

Assigned to the 5th Naval District and based at Greenbackville, Katherine operated as a shore and section patrol boat in the southern Chesapeake Bay and in Virginia's Atlantic coastal waters in and around Chincoteague Bay until just under three weeks before the end of World War I. She was renamed USS SP-715 sometime in 1918.

SP-715 was decommissioned on 22 October 1918 and returned to the Virginia Fish and Oyster Commission the same day.
