= List of people with given name Katherine =

This is a list of notable individuals named Katherine or Catherine.

== * ==
- Katherine of Bavaria, the eldest child of Albert I, Duke of Bavaria
- Katherine of England, the fifth child of Henry III
- Catherine of Braganza (1638 – 1705), Queen consort of England, Scotland, and Ireland
- Catherine the Great (1729 – 1796), Empress of Russia
- Katherine of Ledbury, Gloucestershire-born noblewoman of the 13th century
- Katherine of Sutton, Benedictine nun

== A ==
- Katherine Aaslestad (1961–2021), American scholar
- Katherine Langhorne Adams (1885–1977), American painter and printmaker
- Katherine B. Aguon (born 1931), Guamanian educator and politician
- Katherine Aidala, American physicist
- Katherine Albert (1902–1970), American screenwriter, playwright, and TV writer
- Katherine Albrecht (born 1968), consumer privacy advocate
- Katherine Alvarado (born 1991), Costa Rican footballer
- Katherine Alvarado (taekwondo) (born 1988), Costa Rican taekwondo practitioner
- Katherine Anderson (1944–2023), American singer
- Katherine McCall Anderson (1866–1924), leading civilian and military matron
- Katherine Angel, British academic and writer
- Katherine Applegate (born 1956), American young adult and children's fiction writer
- Katherine Araniello (1965–2019), London-based live art, performance and video artist
- Katherine Archuleta (born 1949), American teacher and a political executive
- Katherine Arden (born 1987), American novelist
- Katherine Arnoldi (born 1951), American writer and graphic novelist
- Catherine Arnott (1858–1942), British medical doctor and suffragette
- Katherine Ashenburg, Canadian writer
- Katherine August-deWilde (born 1948), American business executive, board member, and philanthropist
- Katherine Aumer (born 1981), American social psychologist
- Katherine Austen (1629–1683), English diarist and poet
- Katherine Ayres, American writer of children's literature

== B ==
- Katherine Bacon (1896–1982), English classical pianist and faculty member
- Katherine Baicker (born 1971), American health economist
- Katherine Bailess, American actress, singer, and dancer
- Katherine Balderston (1895–1979), American scholar of 18th-century English literature
- Katherine Reed Balentine (1875–1934), American suffragist
- Katherine Bankole-Medina, professor of history
- Katherine Barbeau, professor
- Katherine Barber (1959–2021), British-born Canadian lexicographer
- Katherine Barnardiston (?–1633), English patron of puritanism
- Katherine J. Barr (1871/1872–1931), American nurse and community leader
- Katherine Barrell, Canadian actress, writer, producer, and director
- Katherine Bashford (1885–1953), American landscape architect
- Katherine Bates (born 1982), Australian former track and road cyclist
- Katherine Bathurst (1862–1933), British Inspector of schools
- Katherine Beckett, American sociologist
- Katherine Behar, American new media and performance artist and writer
- Katherine Arthur Behenna (1860–1926), Scottish-born portrait miniaturist, poet, spiritualist, and suffragist
- Katherine Bellenden (1497–1568), courtier working in the wardrobe of James V of Scotland
- Katherine Belov (born 1973), Australian geneticist, professor of comparative genomics
- Katherine Bennell-Pegg (born 1984), Australian astronaut
- Katherine Bergeron (born 1958), American musicologist and academic administrator
- Katherine, Lady Berkeley (?–1385), English benefactor and school founder
- Katherine Bernhardt (born 1975), artist
- Katherine M. Bidegaray (born 1960), American lawyer
- Katherine Bitting (1869–1937), food chemist for the United States Department of Agriculture
- Katherine M. H. Blackford (1875–1958), American pioneering writer
- Katherine Devereux Blake (1858–1950), American educator, peace activist, women's rights activist, and writer
- Katherine Russell Bleecker (1893–1996), American filmmaker in the silent film era
- Katherine Bloodgood (1871–1967), American contralto singer and vaudeville performer
- Katherine Blundell, professor of astrophysics
- Katherine Dow Blyton (born 1964), English actress
- Katherine Bobak, Canadian pair skater
- Katherine Boehret (born 1980), columnist
- Katherine Boo (born 1964), American investigative journalist
- Katherine Borden, Canadian researcher
- Catherine Borghi (born 1976), Swiss alpine skier
- Katherine Bourke, Australian lawyer and judge
- Katherine Bowling (born 1955), painter
- Katherine Boyer, Métis artist
- Katherine Boyle, zooarchaeologist
- Katherine Bracken, official of the Foreign Service Officers (FSO) for the US Department of State
- Katherine Bradford (born 1942), American artist
- Katherine Brading (born 1970), philosopher of science and historian of science
- Katherine Brandon, Duchess of Suffolk (1519–1580), English noblewoman
- Katherine Briçonnet (1494–1526), French noblewoman
- Katherine Ruth Bridges (born 1954), American landscape architect
- Katherine Brooks (born 1976), American film writer and director
- Katherine Brown (psychologist), professor
- Katherine Brown (cricketer) (born 1953), English former cricketer
- Katherine Whelan Brown (1872–1942), the first female Democrat elected to the New Jersey State Legislature
- Katherine Browning (1864–1946), New Zealand teacher
- Katherine Brunson, professor and zooarchaeologist
- Katherine Bryan (born 1982), British flautist
- Katherine Jane Bryant (born 1974), American television costume designer
- Katherine Bucknell (born 1957), American scholar and novelist
- Katherine Alice Burke (1875–1924), British chemist
- Katherine Burton (1887–1969), American Roman Catholic convert
- Katherine Butler (1914–2000), Irish nun

== C ==
- Katherine Calder (born 1980), cross-country skier
- Katherine Calvin (born 1980s), NASA's chief scientist and senior climate advisor
- Katherine Campbell, Countess of Crawford (?–1578), Scottish noblewoman
- Katherine Campbell (accused witch) (1677–1697), maidservant accused of theft and witchcraft
- Katherine Canavan (born 1949), United States diplomat
- Katherine Cannon (born 1953), American actress
- Katherine Cassavetes (1906–1983), American actress
- Katherine Castillo (born 1996), Panamanian footballer
- Katherine Center (born 1972), American author
- Katherine Chancellor, fictional character from the CBS Daytime soap opera The Young and the Restless
- Katherine Agnes Chandler (1865–1930), botanist and writer
- Katherine Miranda Chang (born 1994), Peruvian former tennis player
- Katherine Garrison Chapin (1890–1977), American poet, librettist, and playwright
- Katherine Chappell (1985–2015), American film visual effects editor
- Katherine Chen, Taiwanese professor
- Katherine Sui Fun Cheung, Chinese aviator
- Katherine Chidley, English Puritan activist and controversialist
- Katherine Chon, co-founder of Polaris Project in the United States
- Katherine Choy (1927–1958), American artist
- Katherine Richardson Christensen (born 1954), professor in biological oceanography
- Katherine Christie, South African politician
- Katherine Chronis, American performance artist
- Katherine Ciesinski (born 1950), American mezzo-soprano, stage director, and voice professor
- Katherine Clark (born 1963), American lawyer and politician
- Katherine Clerides (born 1949), activist for the peaceful reunification of Cyprus
- Katherine Clifton, 2nd Baroness Clifton (1592–1637), English-born Scottish peer
- Katherine Mary Clutterbuck (1860–1946), Anglican nun
- Katherine M. Cohen (1859–1914), American sculptor
- Katherine Cole, American wine writer and journalist
- Katherine K. Coleman, American Republican politician
- Katherine Collins, Canadian-born cartoonist, writer, media personality, stage performer, and composer
- Katherine Compton (1849–1928), English actress
- Katherine Conolly (1662–1752), Irish political hostess, landowner, and philanthropist
- Katherine Eleanor Conway (1853–1927), American journalist, editor, and poet
- Katherine M. Cook (1876–1962), American educator and government official
- Katherine Copeland (born 1990), retired British Olympic Gold Medal winning rower
- Katherine Copely (born 1988), former American-born Ice Dancer
- Katherine Copsey, Australian politician
- Katherine Corey (1660–1692), English actress of the Restoration era
- Katherine Courtauld (1856–1935), British farmer and suffragist
- Katherine Ortega Courtney, American psychologist and author
- Katherine Mayo Cowan (1883–1975), the first woman mayor in North Carolina
- Katherine Cowley, American author
- Katherine Laird Cox (1887–1938), the daughter of a British socialist stockbroker
- Katherine L. Craig (1876–1934), educator and textbook writer
- Katherine Craven (1906–1984), member of the Boston City Council
- Katherine B. Crawford (born 1966), American historian
- Katherine Creag (1973–2021), Filipino-American television journalist
- Katherine Cross (1899–1917), Oklahoma woman
- Katherine A. Crytzer (born 1984), United States district judge
- Katherine Cuff, Canadian economist
- Katherine Cullen (born 1968), American biologist
- Katherine Curry, American professor
- Katherine Whitney Curtis (1897–1980), American swimmer and physical education instructor

== D ==
- Katherine Neel Dale, American medical missionary
- Katherine Davidson (1845–1925), Church of Scotland deaconess
- Katherine Kennicott Davis (1892–1980), American composer
- Katherine Dawn (1896–1984), American actress
- Katherine Day (1889–1976), Canadian artist
- Katherine Delahunt-O'Byrnes (1956–2015), the first woman to become a Circuit Court judge in Ireland
- Katherine DeMille (1911–1995), Canadian-born American actress
- Katherine Demuth, American professor
- Katherine J. Denby, professor
- Katherine DePaul, American talent manager
- Katherine Ann Dettwyler (born 1955), American anthropologist
- Katherine Deves (born 1977/1978), Australian lawyer
- Katherine Devlin, Northern Irish actress
- Katherine Dewar (1943–2026), Canadian historian
- Katherine Dhanani, American diplomat
- Katherine Diamond (born 1954), American architect
- Katherine Dieckmann, American film and music video director
- Katherine Dienes, New Zealand-born organist, conductor and composer
- Katherine Dodds, Canadian writer
- Katherine Sturges Dodge (1890–1979), American writer and illustrator
- Katherine Doherty, American business reporter
- Katherine Douglas (rower) (born 1989), Scottish rower
- Katherine Downes, English television presenter
- Katherine Downie (born 1996), Australian Paralympian
- Katherine Sophie Dreier (1877–1952), American artist
- Katherine Fischer Drew (1923–2023), American historian
- Katherine Rotan Drinker (1888–1956), American physician
- Catherine Dubois (born 1995), Canadian ice hockey player
- Katherine Duffy (1944–2015), the first liaison to the gay and lesbian community in Chicago
- Katherine Dumar (born 1993), Colombian taekwondo practitioner
- Katherine Dunbabin, archaeologist
- Katherine Duncan-Jones (1941–2022), English literature and Shakespeare scholar
- Katherine Dunham (1909–2006), American dancer
- Katherine Dunn (1945–2016), American novelist
- Katherine Doyley Dyer (1585–1654), woman who placed an epitaph on her husband's tomb

== E ==
- Katherine East, Canadian–British actress
- Katherine Eban (born 1966/1967), American investigative journalist and author
- Katherine Ebanks-Wilks, Caymanian politician
- Katherine G. Ecob (1887–1971), American psychologist and educator
- Katherine Edgcumbe (?–1553), English aristocrat and courtier
- Katherine Philips Edson (1870–1933), American reformer and social activist
- Katherine Rose Egan (1861–1951), Australian charity worker
- Katherine Elkins, professor of humanities and comparative literature
- Katherine Ellice (1813–1864), Scottish diarist and artist
- Katherine Pollak Ellickson (1905–1996), American labor economist
- Katherine Ellis (born 1965), English electronica vocalist and songwriter
- Katherine Ellison (born 1957), American author
- Katherine Emery (1906–1980), American stage and film actress
- Katherine Emmet (1878–1960), American actress
- Katherine Endacott (born 1980), former British sprinter
- Katherine Endicott (1882–1967), American philanthropist
- Katherine Esau (1898–1997), pioneering German-American botanist
- Katherine Escobar, Colombian model and actress
- Katherine Espín (born 1991/1992), Ecuadorian beauty pageant titleholder
- Katherine Ettl (1911–1993), American sculptor
- Katherine Everett (1872–1954), Anglo-Irish writer, memorist, and designer of houses and gardens
- Katherine Ewel (born 1944), professor emeritus

== F ==
- Katherine Faber (born 1953), American materials scientist
- Katherine Polk Failla (born 1969), United States district judge
- Katherine G. Farley, Chair of Lincoln Center for the Performing Arts in New York City
- Katherine Levin Farrell (1857–1951), American artist
- Katherine Feeney (radio presenter), Australian radio presenter
- Katherine Feinstein (born 1957), American attorney
- Katherine Ferrara, American engineer
- Katherine Ferrers (1634–1660), English gentlewoman
- Katherine Cutler Ficken (1911–1968), American architect
- Katherine Firth (born 1979), Australian poet
- Katherine Fisk (1860s–1926), American contralto
- Katherine Fitzgerald, Lady of Hy-Carbery (1452–1506), Anglo-Irish noblewoman
- Katherine A. Fitzgerald, Irish-born American molecular biologist and virologist
- Katherine Flegal, American epidemiologist
- Katherine Elizabeth Fleming, president and CEO of the J. Paul Getty Trust
- Katherine Fletcher (born 1976), British Conservative Party politician
- Katherine Stewart Flippin (1906–1996), special educator
- Katherine A. Flores (born 1953), family physician
- Katherine Flowers (1896–1982), African American dancer
- Katherine Fok (born 1941), former Hong Kong government official
- Katherine A. Foley (1889–1981), Irish-American politician
- Catherine Fookes (born 1970), British politician
- Katherine Forbes-Smith, Bahamian lawyer and politician
- Katherine Emmons Force (1891–1956), American real estate investor
- Katherine B. Forrest (born 1964), New York law firm partner
- Katherine V. Forrest (born 1939), Canadian-born American writer
- Katherine Forsyth, Scottish historian
- Katherine P. Frank, American literary scholar
- Katherine Franke, American legal scholar
- Katherine Franz (born 1972), chair of the department of chemistry at Duke University
- Katherine Frazier (1882–1944), American musician
- Katherine H. Freeman, professor
- Katherine Freese (born 1957), theoretical astrophysicist
- Katherine Freund (born 1950), American activist
- Katherine Fryer (1910–2017), English artist
- Katherine Fugate (born 1965), American film/television writer and producer

== G ==
- Katherine Gallagher (born 1935), Australian poet
- Catherine Galliford (1966–2025), Canadian police officer
- Katherine Garrett-Cox (born 1967), British business executive
- Katherine Gehl (born 1966), American businesswoman
- Katherine Gell (1624–1671), religious patron
- Catherine Alicia Georges (born 1944), American nurse
- Katherine Gili (born 1948), British sculptor
- Katherine Glass (born 1947), American actress
- Katherine Glessner (born 1986), American rower
- Katherine Godwin (1917–2015), the first lady of Virginia (1966–1970; 1974–1978)
- Katherine Hancock Goode (1872–1928), teacher, teacher educator, administrator, and state legislator in Illinois
- Katherine L. Gordon, Canadian poet
- Katherine Gottlieb, president and chief executive officer
- Katherine Govier (born 1948), Canadian novelist and essayist
- Katherine Grable, American gymnast
- Katherine Grainger (born 1975), Scottish former rower
- Katherine FitzGerald, Viscountess Grandison (1660–1725), wealthy Irish heiress
- Katherine Whyte Grant (1845–1928), Scottish writer
- Katherine Gray (born 1965), Canadian glass artist and professor
- Katherine L. Gregory (born 1961), the first female flag officer in the United States Navy Civil Engineer Corps
- Katherine C. Grier, American historian and author
- Katherine Griffith (1876–1921), American character actress
- Katherine Van Allen Grinnell (1839–1917), American lecturer

== H ==
- Katherine Haataja (born 1969), Finnish-Swedish mezzo-soprano and entrepreneur
- Katherine Hadford (born 1989), Hungarian-American former competitive figure skater
- Katherine Hagedorn (1961–2013), American ethnomusicologist
- Katherine Haik (born 2000), American model and beauty queen
- Katherine Hajjar, American pediatrician, cell biologist, and academic administrator
- Katherine Hale (1874–1956), Canadian poet, critic, and short story writer
- Katherine Spencer Halpern (1913–2004), American anthropologist and educator
- Katherine Halvorsen, American statistician and statistics educator
- Katherine Hamilton (1863–1932), women's suffrage activist
- Katherine Hammack (born 1959), the former United States assistant secretary of the Army
- Katherine Hankey (1834–1911), English missionary and nurse
- Katherine Hanley (born 1943), American Democratic politician in Virginia
- Katherine Hannigan (born 1962), children's and young adults' writer
- Katherine Hare (born 1978), English theatre director
- Katherine Haringhton (born 1971), Venezuelan lawyer
- Katherine Harkay, American physicist working on particle accelerators
- Katherine Harley (1881–1961), American amateur golfer
- Katherine Harley (suffragist) (1855–1917), suffragist
- Katherine Harloe, professor of classics and director of the Institute of Classical Studies
- Katherine Corri Harris (1890–1927), American actress and socialite
- Katherine Harris (born 1957), American politician from Florida
- Katherine Safford Harris, psychologist and speech scientist
- Katherine Harrison, landowning widow
- Katherine Hasselet, Flemish tapestry artist
- Katherine Hastings, American poet
- Katherine Hastings, Countess of Huntingdon, English noblewoman
- Katherine Neville, Baroness Hastings (1442–between January and March 25, 1504), noblewoman
- Katherine Hattam, Australian artist
- Katherine Hauptman (born 1970), Swedish archaeologist and museum researcher
- Katherine Hawes (born 1969), English lawn and indoor bowler international
- Katherine Hawley (1971–2021), British philosopher
- Katherine Healy (born 1969), American former principal ballerina and actress
- Katherine Heigl (born 1978), American actress
- Katherine Heinrich (born 1954), mathematician
- Katherine Heiny (born 1968), American writer
- Katherine Helmond (1929–2019), American actress
- Katherine Usher Henderson (1937–2022), college professor and administrator
- Katherine Herring (1933–2018), All-American Girls Professional Baseball League player
- Catherine Hervieu (born 1958), French politician
- Katherine Ruth Heyman (1877–1944), American pianist and composer
- Katherine Hicks, Australian actress
- Katherine A. High, American doctor-scientist
- Katherine Hilgenberg (1920–1988), Broadway performer
- Katherine Hilliker, American screenwriter and film editor
- Katherine Hite, U.S. author and academic
- Katherine Ho (born 1999), singer
- Katherine A. Hoadley, American breast cancer researcher
- Katherine Hobbs, former Ottawa city councillor
- Katherine Hodgson (1889–1974), archaeologist
- Katherine B. Hoffman (1914–2020), American chemist
- Katherine Hollingsworth, former American Democratic politician
- Katherine McLean Holmes (1849–1925), New Zealand painter
- Katherine Holt (born 1977), British chemist
- Katherine Hoover (1937–2018), American composer
- Katherine Hopson (born 1982), British sailor
- Katherine Horny (born 1969), former volleyball player
- Katherine Hoskins (1909–1988), American poet
- Katherine G. Howard (1898–1986), graduate of Smith College
- Katherine Howe, American novelist
- Katherine Howell, Australian crime writer
- Katherine Hui (born 2005), American tennis player
- Katherine Hupalo (1890–1974), actress

== I ==
- Katherine Igoe, Irish actress
- Katherine Ip (born 1995), American-born former Hong Kong tennis player
- Katherine Isbister, game and human computer interaction researcher and designer

== J ==
- Katherine Jackson (born 1930), the matriarch of the Jackson family
- Katherine Jakeways, British comedian
- Katherine Jansen, American historian
- Katherine Jashinski (born 1982), conscientious objector
- Katherine Jenkins (born 1980), Welsh singer
- Katherine Jerkovic, Canadian film director
- Katherine St. John, professor
- Katherine Johnson (1918–2020), American mathematician
- Katherine Joy, professor of earth sciences
- Katherine Juhan-Arnold, American politician
- Katherine Jungjohann, scientist and engineer
- Katherine Justice (born 1942), American actress

== K ==
- Katherine Kamhi (born 1964), American actress
- Katherine Kane (politician) (1935–2013), American politician
- Katherine Sophia Kane (1811–1886), Irish botanist
- Katherine Anna Kang (born 1970), American video game designer
- Katherine Karađorđević (born 1943), Serbian royal
- Katherine Kath (1920–2012), French ballerina
- Katherine Kazarian (born 1990), American politician
- Katherine Kealoha, American prosecutor
- Katherine Keating (1922–2009), American military servicewoman
- Katherine Kellgren (1969–2018), American actress
- Katherine C. Kelly (1924–2011), American activist
- Katherine Kessey (born 1946), Australian actress
- Katherine Keyes (born 1980), American epidemiologist
- Katherine M King (1881–c. 1967), British pharmacist
- Katherine Kingsley (born 1982), English actress
- Katherine Kirk (born 1982), Australian golfer
- Katherine Kirkland (1808–1892), Australian colonist
- Katherine Kitt (1876–1945), American artist
- Katherine Klein, American psychologist
- Katherine Knight (born 1955), Australian murderer
- Katherine Knight (artist) (born 1955), Canadian artist
- Katherine L. Knight, American immunologist
- Katherine Singer Kovács (1946–1989), American academic
- Katherine Elizabeth Krohn (born 1961), American author
- Katherine Kuchenbecker, American researcher
- Katherine Kurt (1852–1910), American physician
- Katherine Kurtz (born 1944), American writer

== L ==
- Katherine Laich (1910–1992), prominent librarian
- Katherine LaNasa (born 1966), American actress
- Katherine D. Landing (born 1963), American politician of the Republican Party
- Katherine Langford (born 1996), Australian actress
- Katherine G. Langley (1888–1948), American politician
- Katherine Langrish, British author
- Katherine Lanpher (born 1959), American writer
- Katherine Lapp (born 1957), American lawyer
- Katherine Larson, American poet, molecular biologist and field ecologist
- Katherine A. Lathrop (1915–2005), American nuclear medicine researcher
- Katherine Lawrence (1954–2004), American television series screenwriter
- Katherine Puckett Layton, American mathematics educator
- Katherine Leckie (1860–1930), Canadian-American journalist
- Katherine Legge (born 1980), British professional auto racing driver
- Katherine Lemos, American safety professional
- Katherine F. Lenroot (1891–1982), American feminist and child welfare advocate
- Katherine G. Leonard (born 1959), Judge of the Hawaii Intermediate Court of Appeals
- Katherine Reynolds Lewis, American journalist and author
- Katherine Scanlon Lewis (born 1970), American rower
- Katherine Leyton, Canadian poet
- Katherine Liberovskaya (born 1961), Canadian video artist
- Katherine Litz (1912–1978), American dancer, teacher, and choreographer
- Katherine Allen Lively, American writer and musician
- Katherine Locke (1910–1995), Broadway actress
- Katherine Loker (1915–2008), American heiress and philanthropist
- Katherine Losse, American writer
- Katherine Lowther (1653–1713), English electoral patron
- Katherine Luzuriaga, American physician and pediatric immunologist
- Katherine Lynch (born 1971), Irish television personality

== M ==
- Katherine Burns Mabry (1886–1958), one of New Mexico's first female lawyers
- Katherine MacDonald (1891–1956), American stage and film actress
- Katherine MacGregor (1925–2018), American actress
- Katherine Duer Mackay (1878–1930), American suffragist
- Katherine Mackay (1901–1975), Australian police officer
- Katherine MacLean (1925–2019), American science fiction author
- Katherine Stewart MacPhail (1887–1974), Scottish surgeon
- Katherine Magarian (1906–2000), survivor of the Armenian genocide
- Katherine Magbanua (born 1984/1985), American convicted murderer
- Katherine Maher (born 1983), American businesswoman
- Katherine Maine (born 1997), Canadian professional racing cyclist
- Katherine Manion (1867–1956), American physician and suffragist
- Katherine Manners, English actress, screenwriter, and playwright
- Katherine Mansfield (1888–1923), New Zealand writer and critic
- Katherine Maraman (born 1951), American judge
- Katherine Marsh (born 1974), writer of children's literature
- Katherine Martínez, Venezuelan lawyer, activist, and human rights defender
- Katherine Martorell (born 1982), Chilean politician
- Katherine Mathieson (born 1975), the director of the Royal Institution
- Katherine Clerk Maxwell (1824–1886), the wife of Scottish physicist James Clerk Maxwell
- Katherine Mayfair, fictional character created by Marc Cherry for the ABC television series Desperate Housewives
- Katherine Mayfield, memoirist, short story writer, poet, and nonfiction author
- Katherine Mayo (1867–1940), American historian and nativist
- Katherine McAlpine (born 1985), American science journalist and rapper
- Katherine McAuliffe, Canadian psychologist
- Katherine Elizabeth McClellan (1859–1934), professional photographer
- Katherine McClure (born 1981), Canadian actress
- Katherine McCoy (born 1945), American graphic designer and educator
- Katherine McFetridge, American rower
- Katherine A. McGlynn, American cancer epidemiologist
- Katherine McGrath (born 1944), American singer and stage and television actress
- Katherine Brunett McGuire, American political aide
- Katherine McHale (born 1955), former American government official
- Katherine McJunkin, American biologist
- Katherine Winthrop McKean (1914–1997), top-ranked American tennis player
- Katherine McKenzie, professor of medicine
- Katherine McKittrick, Canadian professor and academic
- Katherine McLoughlin (1650–1677), successful Irish Quaker preacher
- Katherine McNamara (publisher), writer, editor, and digital publisher in Charlottesville, Virginia
- Katherine McNamara (born 1995), American actress and singer
- Katherine Medina, Colombian model
- Katherine M. Menendez (born 1971), American attorney
- Katherine Merchant (born 1985), English female rugby union player
- Katherine Merrill, American artist
- Katherine Milhous (1894–1977), American artist, illustrator, and writer
- Katherine Miller (born 1994), Brazilian American fencer
- Katherine Mills (born 1983), English magician and mentalist
- Katherine Miranda (born 1986), Colombian political scientist
- Katherine Mirica, American chemist
- Katherine Mitchell (born 1944), American artist
- Katherine Moennig (born 1977), American actress
- Katherine Monaghan (born 1980), British actress
- Katherine Monbiot (1964–1997), English former World Champion armwrestler
- Katherine Monti, American biostatistician
- Katherine Rose Morley (born 1989), English actress
- Katherine Faw Morris (born 1983), American writer
- Katherine Morse, American computer scientist
- Katherine Mortimer, Countess of Warwick (1314–1369), the wife of Thomas de Beauchamp, 11th Earl of Warwick KG
- Katherine Mountain (born 1986), Hong Kong field hockey player
- Katherine Mudge (1881–1975), British archer
- Katherine O. Musgrave (1920–2015), American academic

== N ==
- Katherine Nash (1910–1982), American artist and sculptor
- Katherine Needleman (born 1978), American oboist
- Katherine Greacen Nelson (1913–1982), American geologist
- Katherine Nelson (1930–2018), American developmental psychologist
- Katherine Newman (born 1953), American academic administrator and author
- Katherine Ng (book artist), book artist and letterpress printer
- Katherine Ng (born 1974), government official of Hong Kong
- Katherine Schlick Noe, professor

== O ==
- Katherine Obiang, Cameroonian-Nigerian actress
- Katherine O'Brien (born 1963), Canadian American pediatric infectious disease physician
- Katherine Prudhomme O'Brien, American politician
- Katherine O'Doherty (1881–1969), Irish republican
- Katherine O'Brien O'Keeffe (born 1948), American medievalist specializing in Old English
- Catherine O'Hara (1954–2026), Canadian-American actress
- Katherine E. Oler (born 1972), American lawyer
- Katherine Oliver, American media and entertainment executive
- Katherine Olmsted (1888–1964), American Red Cross nurse
- Katherine O'Regan (1946–2018), New Zealand politician
- Katherine Orrison (born 1948), American set decorator
- Katherine D. Ortega (born 1934), former politician
- Katherine Ortiz (born 1991), Ecuadorian professional footballer

== P ==
- Katherine Hall Page (born 1947), American writer
- Katherine Palmer (abbess) (born 1576), abbess of Syon Abbey
- Katherine Van Winkle Palmer (1895–1982), tertiary paleontologist
- Katherine Pancol (born 1954), French journalist and novelist
- Katherine Te Rongokahira Parata (1873–1939), New Zealand woman of mana
- Katherine Vose Parker (1888–1983), American Republican politician
- Katherine Parkinson (born 1977/1978), English actress
- Katherine Parr (actress) (1921–2009), British actress
- Katherine Paston (1578–1629), English gentlewoman
- Katherine Paterson (born 1932), American writer
- Katherine Paul (born 1989), Swinomish/Iñupiaq singer-songwriter
- Katherine Peden (1926–2006), the first woman appointed as the commissioner of commerce in Kentucky
- Katherine Percy, Countess of Kent (1423–1475), the daughter of Henry Percy, 2nd Earl of Northumberland
- Katherine Pettit (1868–1936), American educator and suffragist
- Katherine Philips (1631/32–1664), Anglo-Welsh royalist poet
- Katherine W. Phillips (1972–2020), American business theorist
- Katherine Pierpoint (born 1961), English poet
- Katherine Pleydell-Bouverie (1895–1985), pioneer in modern English studio pottery
- Katherine Plouffe (born 1992), Canadian basketball player
- Katherine Plunket (1820–1932), Anglo-Irish aristocrat and botanical illustrator
- Katherine Plymley (1758–1829), diarist, traveller, painter and naturalist
- Katherine de la Pole (1410/1411–1473), abbess of Barking Abbey
- Katherine Pollard, the director of the Gladstone Institute of Data Science and Biotechnology
- Katherine Anne Porter (1890–1980), American journalist
- Katherine Porter (1941/1944–2024), American visual artist
- Katherine Porterfield, American child psychologist
- Katherine Ann Power (born 1949), American ex-convict and long-time fugitive
- Katherine T. Hooper Prescott (1851–1926), American sculptor
- Katherine Press, English actress
- Katherine K. Preston (born 1950), American musicologist and educator
- Katherine Preston (born 1951), British college head
- Katherine Prestridge, American scientist
- Katherine Arnold Price (1893–1989), Irish poet and writer
- Katherine E. Price, American philanthropist
- Katherine Priddy (born 1994), English folk singer and songwriter
- Katherine Propper (born 1993), American film director and screenwriter
- Katherine Prumm (born 1988), former New Zealand professional motocross rider
- Katherine Pulaski, fictional medical doctor in Star Trek: The Next Generation
- Katherine Purdon (1852–1920), Irish novelist and playwright

== R ==
- Katherine Hancock Ragsdale (born 1959), American Episcopal priest
- Katherine Rake, director of Lucent
- Katherine Raleigh (1852–1922), English classics scholar, suffragist and tax resister
- Katherine Ralls (born 1939), American zoologist
- Katherine Ramos (born 1991), Guatemalan retired footballer
- Katherine Ramsay (1720s–1808), milliner and Edinburgh shopkeeper
- Katherine Ramsland (born 1953), American non-fiction author
- Katherine Ravenswood, New Zealand professor
- Katherine Rawls (1917–1982), American competition swimmer
- Katherine A. Rawson, American cognitive psychologist
- Katherine Raymont (born 1959), Australian former cricketer
- Katherine Reback (1950/51–2010), American screenwriter
- Katherine Rednall (born 1996), English lawn and indoor bowler
- Katherine S. Reed (1881–1922), American screenwriter
- Katherine Regalado (born 1998), Peruvian volleyball player
- Katherine Reid, former American politician
- Katherine Reutter (born 1988), American short track speed skater
- Katherine Reynolds (born 1987), American former professional soccer player
- Katherine Rich (born 1967), member of the New Zealand House of Representatives
- Katherine Russell Rich (1955–2012), American autobiographical writer
- Katherine Gilmore Richardson (born 1983/1984), Democratic politician
- Katherine Richardson (swimmer), Canadian former swimmer
- Catherine Rimbert (born 1968), French politician
- Katherine Ritvo (born 1969), race horse trainer
- Katherine Roberts (television personality), golf fitness instructor
- Katherine Roberts (author), English author
- Katherine Rodríguez (born 1991), Dominican taekwondo practitioner
- Katherine Romero, Colombian attorney
- Katherine Magdalene Rose, transgender author
- Katherine Rosman (born 1972), American writer
- Katherine Ross (scientist), British marine biologist
- Katherine Ross (died 1697) (1635–1697), Scottish Covenanter
- Katherine Rothman, the CEO and founder of KMR Communications, Inc
- Katherine Routledge (1866–1935), English archaeologist and anthropologist
- Katherine Rowe, American scholar
- Katherine Rundell (born 1987), English author and academic
- Katherine Fernandez Rundle (born 1950), current State Attorney for Miami-Dade County in Florida
- Katherine Russell (social worker) (1909–1998), English social worker
- Katherine Ruth, American model
- Katherine Ryan (born 1983), Canadian comedian

== S ==
- Katherine Salant, journalist
- Katherine Salosny (born 1964), Chilean actress and television presenter
- Katherine Saltzberg (born 1962), American actress, singer, and comic
- Katherine Samaras, laboratory head
- Katherine Sanford (1915–2005), American biologist and cancer researcher
- Katherine Sarafian (born 1969), Armenian-American film producer
- Katherine Siva Saubel (1920–2011), Native American scholar
- Katherine Sauerbrey (born 1997), German cross-country skier
- Katherine Saunders (1841–1894), English novelist
- Katherine Schipper, American accounting researcher and educator
- Katherine Schmidt (1899–1978), American artist and art activist
- Catherine Schneider (1856–1918), Baltic German saint
- Katherine Scholes (born 1959), Australian writer
- Katherine Schwarzenegger (born 1989), American author
- Katherine Lee Schwennsen, American architect
- Katherine Sciver-Brunt (born 1985), English former cricketer
- Katherine Marbury Scott (1607/1610–1687), Quaker advocate and colonist
- Katherine Sebov (born 1999), Canadian professional tennis player
- Katherine D. Seelman, American academic
- Katherine Seley-Radtke, American medicinal chemist
- Katherine Gillespie Sells, psychotherapist
- Katherine Sherwood (born 1952), American artist
- Katherine Shindle (born 1977), American actress, singer and dancer
- Katherine Binney Shippen (1892–1980), American history teacher
- Katherine Shonfield (1954–2003), British architect and writer
- Katherine Neal Simmons (1884–1940), American soprano singer
- Katherine Call Simonds (1865–1946), American musician
- Katherine Ashton Simpson (1858–1951), British author, poet, and painter
- Katherine Sims, American politician
- Katherine Skipper, New Zealand architect
- Katherine McHale Slaughterback (1893–1969), killer of 140 rattlesnakes
- Katherine Douglas Smith (1878–1947), militant British suffragette
- Katherine Smith (footballer) (born 1998), Australian rules footballer
- Katherine Smith (Navajo activist) (1918–2017), Navajo activist, cultural educator
- Katherine Smyth, New Zealand studio potter
- Katherine Solomon, American poet
- Katherine Sonderegger (born 1950), American Episcopal priest
- Katherine Sopka, science interviewer
- Katherine Southwell (born 1657), English courtier
- Katherine Sparrow (born 1976), author of middle-grade, young adult and adult speculative fiction
- Katherine Speed (born 2001), English cricketer
- Katherine Spilde, American anthropologist
- Katherine Spillar, American executive editor
- Katherine Sproehnle (1894–1976), American writer
- Katherine Squibb (1949–2018), American toxicologist
- Katherine Squire (1903–1995), American actress
- Katherine de Stafford (1376–1419), daughter of Hugh de Stafford, 2nd Earl of Stafford
- Katherine E. Standefer, American writer of creative nonfiction
- Katherine E. Stange, Canadian-American mathematician
- Katherine Stanhope, Countess of Chesterfield (1609–1667), English courtier
- Katherine Stenholm (1917–2015), American film director
- Katherine Stewart (journalist), American journalist and author
- Katherine Stewart-Jones (born 1995), Canadian cross-country skier
- Katherine Stieglitz (1898–1971), daughter of an American photographer
- Katherine Stinson (1891–1977), American aviation pioneer
- Katherine Stone (born 1949), American doctor
- Katherine Stourton, Baroness Grey of Codnor (1455–1521), English noblewoman
- Katherine Strueby (1908–1988), American-born British screenwriter
- Katherine Stuart (1612–1650), English noblewoman
- Katherine Stubbes (1570/71–1590), Englishwoman
- Katherine Sutcliffe (born 1952), American author
- Katherine Swift (1956–2004), Irish-born Portuguese painter
- Katherine Swynford (1349–1403), the third wife of John of Gaunt, Duke of Lancaster

== T ==
- Katherine Tai (born 1974), American attorney
- Katherine Tapia (born 1992), Colombian professional footballer
- Katherine Tate (born 1962), American political scientist
- Katherine C Taylor (born 1974), American artist
- Katherine Teck (born 1939), American author
- Katherine J. Thompson, statistician in the United States Census Bureau
- Katherine Thomson (English writer) (1797–1862), English writer
- Katherine Thomson (Australian writer), Australian playwright and screenwriter
- Katherine Cecil Thurston (1874–1911), Irish novelist
- Katherine D. Tillman (1870–1923), American writer
- Katherine Tingley (1847–1929), social worker
- Katherine Bell Tippetts (1865–1950), American businesswoman
- Katherine Torrance (born 1998), British diver
- Katherine Amelia Towle (1898–1986), the second director of the United States Marine Corps Women's Reserve
- Katherine Tristram (1858–1948), British missionary and teacher in Japan

== U ==
- Katherine Uchida (born 1999), Canadian rhythmic gymnast

== V ==
- Katherine Valli (born 2003), American para-badminton player
- Katherine Vargas, Nicaraguan footballer
- Katherine Vaz (born 1955), Portuguese-American writer
- Katherine Verdery (born 1948), American anthropologist, author, and emeritus professor
- Katherine Vibert (born 1999), American weightlifter
- Katherine Victor (1923–2004), American actress
- Katherine Vig, American orthodontist
- Katherine Villiers, Duchess of Buckingham (1603–1649), English aristocrat

== W ==
- Katherine Waddell (born 1938), Virginia politician
- Katherine Sleeper Walden (1862–1949), American environmental conservationist
- Katherine Waldron, American politician
- Katherine Walker (1848–1931), German-American lighthouse keeper
- Catherine Wallen, American politician
- Katherine Wallis (1861–1957), Canadian sculptor
- Katherine Wallman (?–2024), American statistician
- Katherine Walsh (actress) (1947–1970), American actress
- Katherine Warington (1897–1993), botanist
- Katherine Brehme Warren (1909–1991), American geneticist and scientific editor
- Katherine Warren (1905–1965), American film and television actress
- Katherine Urquhart Warren (1897–1976), organization founder
- Katherine Washington (1933–2019), former American women's basketball player
- Katherine Waterston (born 1980), British-American actress
- Katherine Watney (1870–1958), British-born missionary nurse
- Katherine Watt (1886–1963), British military nurse, nursing administrator and civil servant
- Katherine Weare (born 1950), professor
- Katherine Webb (born 1989), American model, beauty queen, and television personality
- Katherine Weimer (1919–2000), research physicist
- Katherine Wei-Sender (1930–2024), Chinese American contract bridge player
- Katherine Wellesley-Pole, Countess of Mornington (1761–1851), the wife of William Wellesley-Pole, 3rd Earl of Mornington
- Katherine Westbury (born 1993), Thai-New Zealand tennis player
- Katherine Westphal (1919–2018), American textile designer and fiber artist
- Katherine R. Whitmore (1897–1984), Spanish literature professor
- Katherine Whittred, retired Canadian politician
- Katherine Haley Will, American academic administrator
- Katherine Willis, Baroness Willis of Summertown (born 1964), British biologist, academic and life peer
- Katherine Willis, American actress and producer
- Katherine Wilmot (1773–1824), Irish traveller and diarist
- Katherine Winder (born 1992), Peruvian badminton player
- Katherine Witchie (1884–1967), American dancer
- Katherine Woodfine (born 1983), British children's author
- Katherine Woodthorpe, Australian chair and company director
- Katherine Prescott Wormeley (1830–1908), nurse in the American Civil War
- Katherine Fairfax Wright, American filmmaker and documentarian
- Katherine Wright (field hockey) (born 1989), women's field hockey player
- Katherine Wynter (born 1996), Jamaican badminton player

== Y ==
- Katherine Yelick, American computer scientist
- Catherine Yi (1783–1839), Korean saint
- Katherine K. Young, Canadian religious studies professor
- Katherine Young (centenarian) (1901–2005), American centenarian

== Z ==
- Katherine Zappone (born 1953), American-Irish independent politician

== Disambiguation pages ==
- Katherine, multiple people
- Katherine Allen, multiple people
- Katherine Anderson, multiple people
- Katherine Barker, multiple people
- Katherine Beaumont, multiple people
- Katherine Bell, multiple people
- Katherine Bennett, multiple people
- Katherine Blair, multiple people
- Katherine Casey, multiple people
- Katherine Clarke, multiple people
- Katherine Collins, multiple people
- Katherine Cox, multiple people
- Katherine Craig, multiple people
- Katherine Crawford, multiple people
- Katherine Davis, multiple people
- Katherine Edwards, multiple people
- Katherine Evans, multiple people
- Katherine FitzGerald, multiple people
- Katherine Fleming, multiple people
- Katherine Forbes, multiple people
- Katherine Foster, multiple people
- Katherine Fowler, multiple people
- Katherine Frank, multiple people
- Katherine Fraser, multiple people
- Katherine Graham, multiple people
- Katherine Grant, multiple people
- Katherine Green, multiple people
- Katherine Grey, multiple people
- Katherine Harris, multiple people
- Katherine Henderson, multiple people
- Katherine Hughes, multiple people
- Katherine Hunt, multiple people
- Katherine Hunter, multiple people
- Katherine Jackson, multiple people
- Katherine Jones, multiple people
- Katherine Kelly, multiple people
- Katherine Lang, multiple people
- Katherine Lee, multiple people
- Katherine Lewis, multiple people
- Katherine Lloyd, multiple people
- Katherine Marlowe, multiple people
- Katherine Marshall, multiple people
- Katherine McGregor, multiple people
- Katherine Morgan, multiple people
- Katherine Neville, multiple people
- Katherine Porter, multiple people
- Katherine Prescott, multiple people
- Katherine Richardson, multiple people
- Katherine Roberts, multiple people
- Katherine Robinson, multiple people
- Katherine Ross, multiple people
- Katherine Russell, multiple people
- Katherine Scott, multiple people
- Katherine Smith, multiple people
- Katherine Stevens, multiple people
- Katherine Stewart, multiple people
- Katherine Thompson, multiple people
- Katherine Thomson, multiple people
- Katherine Tucker, multiple people
- Katherine Tudor, multiple people
- Katherine Walker, multiple people
- Katherine Ward, multiple people
- Katherine Williams, multiple people
- Katherine Wilson, multiple people
- Katherine Winter, multiple people
- Katherine Wood, multiple people
- Katherine Woodville, multiple people
- Katherine Wright, multiple people

== See also ==
- Katherine (disambiguation)
- Katherine
- Katerine (disambiguation)
- Catherina
