= Katherine Boyle (disambiguation) =

Katherine Boyle is a British zooarchaeologist.

Katherine Boyle may also refer to:

- Katherine Boyle (venture capitalist) (born 1986 or 1987)
- Katherine Jones, Viscountess Ranelagh (née Boyle; 1615–1691), Anglo-Irish scientist
