= Katherine Lewis =

Katherine Lewis may refer to:

- Katherine Reynolds Lewis, American journalist and author
- Katherine Scanlon Lewis (born 1970), American rower

== See also ==
- Cathy Lewis (1916–1968), American actress
