= Katherine Prescott =

Katherine Prescott or similar may refer to:

- Kathryn Prescott (born 1991), English actress
- Katherine Prescott, The Legend of Hell's Gate: An American Conspiracy character played by Jenna Dewan
- Katherine T. Hooper Prescott (1851–1926), American artist at World's Columbian Exposition

== See also ==
- Katherine Prescott Wormeley (1830–1908), American nurse and author
