= Katherine McJunkin =

American biologist

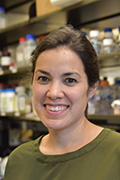
- Education: Princeton University (B.A.); Watson School of Biological Sciences (Ph.D.)
- Awards: Presidential Early Career Award for Scientists and Engineers
- Scientific career
- Fields: Biology
- Workplaces: National Institute of Diabetes and Digestive and Kidney Diseases
- Thesis: Inducible RNAi targeting essential genes (2010)
- Doctoral advisor: Scott W. Lowe

Katherine McJunkin is an American biologist. She is the Stadtman Investigator in the Section On Regulatory RNAs, Laboratory of Cellular and Developmental Biology at the National Institute of Diabetes and Digestive and Kidney Diseases.

== Education ==
McJunkin earned a bachelor of arts from Princeton University in 2005. She completed a Ph.D. in biological sciences at Watson School of Biological Sciences at Cold Spring Harbor Laboratory in 2010. She completed her dissertation, Inducible RNAi targeting essential genes, under advisor Scott W. Lowe. McJunkin was a postdoctoral fellow at University of Massachusetts Medical School from 2011 to 2017. She conducted research with Victor Ambros in the area of post-translational regulation of microRNAs in C. elegans development. She received a K99/R00 Pathway to Independence Award in 2015.

== Career ==
McJunkin is an investigator in the National Institute of Diabetes and Digestive and Kidney Diseases Laboratory of Cellular and Developmental Biology, where she researches the molecular mechanisms that regulate microRNA. In 2019, she was named to the Earl Stadtman Tenure-Track Investigator Program.

She is a recipient of the 2019 Presidential Early Career Award for Scientists and Engineers.
