= Catherine Bennett =

Catherine Bennett may refer to:

- Catherine Bennett (baseball) (born 1920), Canadian pitcher
- Catherine Bennett (journalist) (born 1956), British journalist

== See also ==
- Katherine Bennett (disambiguation)
- Bennett (name)
