= Kate Roberts =

Kate Roberts may refer to:

- Kate Roberts (author) (1891–1985), Welsh-language author
- Kate Roberts (YouthAIDS), founder of educational and AIDS prevention campaign
- Kate Roberts (Days of Our Lives), character in the soap opera Days of Our Lives
- Kate Roberts (triathlete) (born 1983), South African triathlete
- Vulcana (1875–1946), Welsh strongwoman sometimes called Kate Roberts

== See also ==
- Katherine Roberts (disambiguation)
