= Katherine Bennett =

Katherine Bennett may refer to:

- Katherine Bennett (athletics) (1922–2009), African-American pioneer for women's collegiate athletics
- Katherine Bennett (comedian) (born 1976), British comedian

== See also ==
- Catherine Bennett (disambiguation)
