= Kate Lloyd =

Kate Lloyd may refer to:

- Kate Lloyd, character in The Thing (2011 film)
- Kate Lloyd, character in Wire in the Blood
- Katie Lloyd, character in Boston Legal

== See also ==
- Katherine Lloyd (disambiguation)
