= Katherine Henderson =

Katherine Henderson may refer to:

- Katherine Henderson (sports executive) (21st century), Canadian sports executive
- Katherine Henderson (singer) (1909-2002), American blues singer
- Katherine Henderson (physician) (21st century), British physician
- Katherine Usher Henderson (1937–2022), college professor
