= Katherine Harris (disambiguation) =

Katherine Harris (born 1957) is an American politician.

Katherine Harris may also refer to:

- Katherine Safford Harris (born 1925), American psychologist
- Katherine Corri Harris (1890–1927), American actress

== See also ==
- Kate Harris (born 1982), Canadian author
- Katy Harris, fictional character in Coronation Street
- Catherine Harris, Australian businesswoman
