= Katherine Craig =

Katherine Craig (or similar) may refer to:

== Performers ==
- Catherine Craig (1915–2004), American film actress between 1940 and 1950
- Kate Craig (1947–2002), Canadian video and performance artist
- Cathryn Craig (folk singer), American singer since 1990s, married to British guitarist Brian Willoughby

== Others ==
- Katherine L. Craig (1876–1934), American Superintendent of Public Instruction in Colorado
- Kit Craig (1932–2017), pen name of American psychological thriller author Kit Reed
- Katy Craig (hammer thrower) (born 1980), 2002 All-American for Ohio State Buckeyes track and field team
- Catherine Craig (conservationist) (born 1951), American zoologist and conservationist

== Characters ==
- Cathy Craig on American daytime drama One Life to Live from 1969 to 1978

== See also ==
- Cathie Craigie (born 1954), Scottish Labour politician
- Katherine Creag (1973–2021), Filipino-American television journalist
- Kate Craig-Wood (1977–2020), English IT entrepreneur
- Craig (surname)
