= Cathy Forbes (disambiguation) =

Cathy Forbes (later Warwick) was an English chess player.

Cathy Forbes (or similar) may also refer to:

- Cathi Forbes, American politician

== See also ==
- Catherine Forbes (disambiguation)
- Cathy Johnston-Forbes, American golfer
