= Katherine FitzGerald =

Katherine FitzGerald may refer to:

- Katherine FitzGerald, Countess of Desmond (died 1604), noblewoman of the Anglo-Norman FitzGerald dynasty in Ireland, famed for her longevity
- Katherine FitzGerald, Viscountess Grandison (1660–1725), wealthy Irish heiress
- Katherine A. Fitzgerald, Irish-born molecular biologist and virologist
- Katherine Fitzgerald, Lady of Hy-Carbery (1452–1506), Anglo-Irish noblewoman
