= Kate Collins =

Kate Collins may refer to:

- Kate Collins (actress) (born 1959), American actress
- Kate Collins (author), author of the best-selling Flower Shop Mysteries
- Kate Collins (journalist) (born 1983), Australian television presenter and journalist

== See also ==
- Katherine Collins (disambiguation)
