= Katherine Mackay =

Katherine Ada Mackay (10 December 1901 – 15 June 1975) was an Australian police officer who was one of the first women to hold high rank in the Victoria Police.

Mackay was born in Colombo, Ceylon, to Emma (née Foord) and Robert Mackay. Her father was a merchant, and the family lived for periods in New Zealand and New South Wales before eventually settling in Melbourne. After leaving school, Mackay found work as a typist and stenographer for the Motor Registration Branch. She later joined the Victoria Police in the same capacity, working in the office of the commissioner of police. In 1930, Mackay joined the police force itself, as one of eight women officers at the time. She was initially assigned to the plainclothes branch, but later joined the Criminal Investigation Bureau. She was promoted to senior constable in 1943, and made officer-in-charge of the women's section operating out of Russell Street; by that time the number of policewomen had grown to 15. Mackay was mainly assigned to cases involving women, but received several commendations for her work. She passed the required examinations for promotion to sergeant in 1953, but was not promoted as her superiors were unwilling to give her authority over male colleagues (unlike in other states, where there were a number of women in leadership positions). She appealed that decision to the Police Classification Board, which dismissed her complaint; the case received extensive media coverage. However, following a reorganisation in 1956 a separate seniority list for women was created, and Mackay was promoted to sergeant. She served as Officer-in-Charge of the new Women Police Branch from its creation until her retirement in 1961.
