= Katherine Evans =

Katherine Evans may refer to:

- Katherine Evans (missionary), English Quaker activist
- Kathy Evans, English journalist and women's rights activist

== See also ==
- Kathryn Evans, British actress
- Kathryn Evans (swimmer), English swimmer
- Kathryn Evans (writer) (born 1969), English novelist, public speaker and farmer
- Kate Evans (born 1972), British cartoonist, non-fiction author and graphic novelist
- Kate Williams Evans (1866–1961), Welsh suffragette, activist and campaigner for women's rights
- Katy Evans (born 1976), American novelist
