= Katherine Hunt =

Katherine Hunt may refer to:

- Catherine Hunt (1854–1948), mayor of Colchester, England
- Kathryn Hunt, British actress

== See also ==
- Hunt (surname)
