= Katherine Harkay =

American physicist

- Education: Purdue University
- Scientific career
- Fields: Accelerator physics
- Workplaces: Argonne National Laboratory
- Thesis: (1993)
- Doctoral advisor: Lazslo Gutay

Katherine C. Harkay is an American physicist known for her work on particle accelerators and accelerator physics. She is a scientist at Argonne National Laboratory, where she works with the Advanced Photon Source (APS), a major U.S. synchrotron radiation facility used for research in physics, materials science, chemistry, and biology.

== Biography ==
Harkay earned her bachelor's degree in physics at St. John's University in 1982, then her master's degree at Purdue University in 1984. She stayed at Purdue for her PhD in physics, supported by DOE’s Fermi National Accelerator Laboratory, which she completed in 1993 under the supervision of Lazslo Gutay. Gutay, a mentor to Harkay, initially encouraged Harkay to pursue the PhD program at Purdue.

Harkay started working at She now works at the Argonne National Laboratory on the Advanced Photon Source.

Her research focuses on accelerator physics, including the study of electron cloud effects, beam dynamics, and technologies related to high-brightness particle beams.

== Research and contributions ==
Harkay's research focuses on accelerator physics and the development of technologies used in modern particle accelerators and synchrotron light sources. Her work has contributed to the understanding of electron cloud effects, which can influence the stability and performance of particle beams in accelerators.

She has also contributed to the development of photocathodes and superconducting undulator technologies used in high-brightness light sources such as the Advanced Photon Source. These technologies are important for producing intense and highly focused beams of X-rays used in scientific research.

Her work has supported advances in accelerator diagnostics and beam dynamics, helping improve the performance of large research facilities used by scientists around the world.

== Awards and honours ==
- 2009 – Outstanding Alumni Award from Purdue University
- 2013 – Fellow of the American Physical Society for "significant contributions to the understanding of the physics of electron cloud effects and the experimental investigation and understanding of collective effects, as well as for playing leading roles in development of photocathodes and superconducting undulator technology."

== Selected publications ==
- Németh, Károly; Harkay, Katherine C.; van Veenendaal, Michel; Spentzouris, Linda; White, Marion; Attenkofer, Klaus; Srajer, George (26 January 2010). "High-Brightness Photocathodes through Ultrathin Surface Layers on Metals". Physical Review Letters. 104 (4) 046801. Bibcode:2010PhRvL.104d6801N. doi:10.1103/PhysRevLett.104.046801. PMID 20366726.
- Rosenberg, R.A; Harkay, K.C (October 2000). "A rudimentary electron energy analyzer for accelerator diagnostics". Nuclear Instruments and Methods in Physics Research Section A: Accelerators, Spectrometers, Detectors and Associated Equipment. 453 (3): 507–513. Bibcode:2000NIMPA.453..507R. doi:10.1016/S0168-9002(00)00472-1.
- Németh, Károly; Shen, Baifei; Li, Yuelin; Shang, Hairong; Crowell, Robert; Harkay, Katherine C.; Cary, John R. (4 March 2008). "Laser-Driven Coherent Betatron Oscillation in a Laser-Wakefield Cavity". Physical Review Letters. 100 (9) 095002. Bibcode:2008PhRvL.100i5002N. doi:10.1103/PhysRevLett.100.095002. PMID 18352716.
