= Katherine Bowling =

American painter

- Born: Katherine Bowling; 1955 (age 70–71); Washington, D.C.
- Education: Virginia Commonwealth University
- Known for: Painting
- Awards: National Endowment for the Arts Grant; New York State Foundation for the Arts Fellowship; Mid Atlantic Arts Foundation Fellowship
- Website: https://katherinebowling.com/

Katherine Bowling (born 1955, Washington, D.C.) is a painter known for her layered landscape paintings that draw inspiration from nature in the Hudson Valley.

== Early life and education ==
Katherine Bowling grew up in Tidewater, Virginia. She received her BFA from Virginia Commonwealth University in 1978.

== Painting ==
Bowling's first New York show, as well as her first solo exhibition, was in 1987.

Bowling's works tend to be landscape paintings that often feature woods and fields as well as roads.

Many of her paintings are based on her photographs of woods and fields surrounding and in Scholarie County, where she rents a house. As Molly O'Neill notes in an essay on Bowling and her work, this area is "fifty miles northwest of the vistas that inspired the Hudson River School painters in the mid-1800s."

Bowling focused in particular on the imagery of roads for the theme of her exhibition at Greenberg Van Doren, Divide. As the title implies, writes Lilly Wei in the exhibition's accompanying catalog, Bowling views the roads as "abstract marks in the landscape that divide and order space." Even with roads she has often traveled, Bowling finds something new on closer inspection that alters her perception of the familiar and mundane. Bowling explains that the roads "function as a metaphor for memory and displacement."

In 2001, Bowling exhibited a number of seascape paintings. In her essay on the exhibition, art historian and critic Nancy Princenthal writes that, far from being an aberration from Bowling's typically home-based scenes, the ocean paintings are "a return to childhood memories and life long inclinations. A native of Virginia, she spent her first summers at the Atlantic shore and on the Chesapeake Bay."

Primarily, however, Bowling's works focus on capturing the play of light and shadow. Art critic Eleanor Heartney notes that "Her paintings, like those of Monet, Pissarro, and Renoir, focus on the ephemeral moment and the fleeting impression, conjuring the flicker of sunlight through the trees, the shifting shadows of early evening, the reflections of clouds and foliage glancing across the rippling surface of a lake."

O'Neill argues that Bowling additionally "has an innate sense of abstraction and she ranges happy as an uncaged chicken, pecking elements from the Impressionists' obsession with light; from modern photography; and the drip paintings of Jackson Pollock."

Bowling is influenced by the use of light in the paintings of European Romantics such as J. M. W. Turner and John Constable as well as by the later work of George Inness. Her paintings also recall landscapes by Claude Lorrain, Albert Pinkham Ryder and Camille Corot.

=== Process ===
Bowling is known for her use of spackle. She uses a long process of layering and sanding to create the "back-lit" effect found in her paintings.

First, the paintings begin as photographs which she typically takes near her rented house in the Hudson Valley. Then, she uses these photographs, which serve as her "preliminary drawings," to aid in the painting process. She also paints from memory and direct observation.

Bowling paints on square panels of plywood. Bowling considers rectangular pieces to be too horizontal and rife of implications already of landscapes and horizons. She sometimes paints on one of these square and sometimes paints on several square panels together. The seams between these adjoined panels are left visible.

Next, Bowling applies layers of spackle. O'Neill remarks that "Inspired, perhaps, by her day job of painting houses, [Bowling] turned to more industrial media: damp vinyl spackle, a building compound that is applied to wooden panels to create a matte, fresco-like surface. Thinned oil pigments are poured, allowed to dry, and then the Sisyphean task of sanding begins." Initial layers generally correspond with the color of the light—varying from pinks, golds, blues, and oranges. Through this layering and sanding, she creates a luminous quality in her landscapes.

Despite rigorous sanding, air bubbles within the spackle layers are revealed occasionally on the surface. Rather than disguise them, Bowling integrates them. Heartney writes that Bowling "allows these irregularities to become part of the painting so that the viewer's perception of the play of light and shadow across the image cannot be separated from an awareness of surface itself."

In later stages of painting, Bowling stands above panels to throw, dribble, and splatter paint with a hair dryer, recalling the techniques of Abstract Expressionists such as Jackson Pollock.

== Awards and honors ==
- 1991 National Endowment for the Arts Grant
- 1989 New York State Foundation for the Arts Fellowship
- 1988 Mid Atlantic Arts Foundation Fellowship

== Notable public collections ==
- The Metropolitan Museum of Art, New York, NY
- Brooklyn Museum of Art, New York, NY
- Mary and Leigh Block Museum of Art, Evanston, IL
- Phoenix Art Museum, Phoenix, AZ
- Norton Museum of Art, West Palm Beach, CA
- Fisher Landau Center, New York, NY

== Solo exhibitions ==
2010

- "Katherine Bowling: Moments of Grace," April 22 - May 28, 2010, DC Moore Gallery, New York, New York "Katherine Bowling: Moments of Grace"

2009

- VAN STRAATEN GALLERY, Denver, CO

2007

- Greenberg Van Doren Gallery, New York, NY

2006

- David Floria Gallery, Aspen, CO

2005

- Katherine Bowling: Paintings, Greenberg Van Doren Gallery, St. Louis, MO

2004

- Katherine Bowling: Divide, Greenberg Van Doren Gallery, New York, NY

2001

- Katherine Bowling: Land to Sea Joseph Helman Gallery New York, NY

1998

- Katherine Bowling, Joseph Helman Gallery, New York, NY

1996

- Katherine Bowling, Joseph Helman Gallery, New York, NY

1994

- Katherine Bowling: Point of View, The Orlando Museum of Art, Orlando, FL
- Katherine Bowling: New Paintings, Blum Helman Gallery, New York, NY

1992

- New Paintings, Blum Helman, New York, NY

1990

- Katherine Bowling: Drawings, Blum Helman, Los Angeles, CA
- Katherine Bowling:Paintings, Blum Helman, New York, NY

1989

- Rosa Esman Gallery, New York, New York

1988

- Albright-Knox Members Gallery, Buffalo, New York

1987

- Rosa Esman Gallery, New York, New York

== Publications ==
- O'Neill, Molly. Katherine Bowling: Moments of Grace. New York: DC Moore Gallery, 2010.
- Friesen, Andria. Speak for the Trees. Seattle, WA: Friesen Gallery, 2009.
- Wei, Lilly. Katherine Bowling: Divide. New York: Greenberg Van Doren Gallery, 2004.
- Princenthal, Nancy. Katherine Bowling: Land to Sea. New York: Joseph Helman Gallery, 2001.
- Heartney, Eleanor. Katherine Bowling. New York: BlumHelman Gallery, 1990.
- Scott, Sue. Katherine Bowling: New Paintings. New York: Blum Helman Gallery, 1992.
