= Katherine Frank =

Katherine Frank may refer to:

- Katherine Frank (anthropologist), American anthropologist
- Katherine Frank (biographer), American biographer
- Katherine P. Frank, American literary critic
