= Katherine Lang =

Katherine Lang may refer to:

- Katherine Kelly Lang, American actress
- Kathryn Dawn Lang, (stage name: k.d. lang), Canadian singer/songwriter and actress
- Kathryn Layng, American actress

== See also ==
- Kate Lang Johnson
- Kathryn Leng, English cricketer
- Lang (surname)
