= Katherine Hasselet =

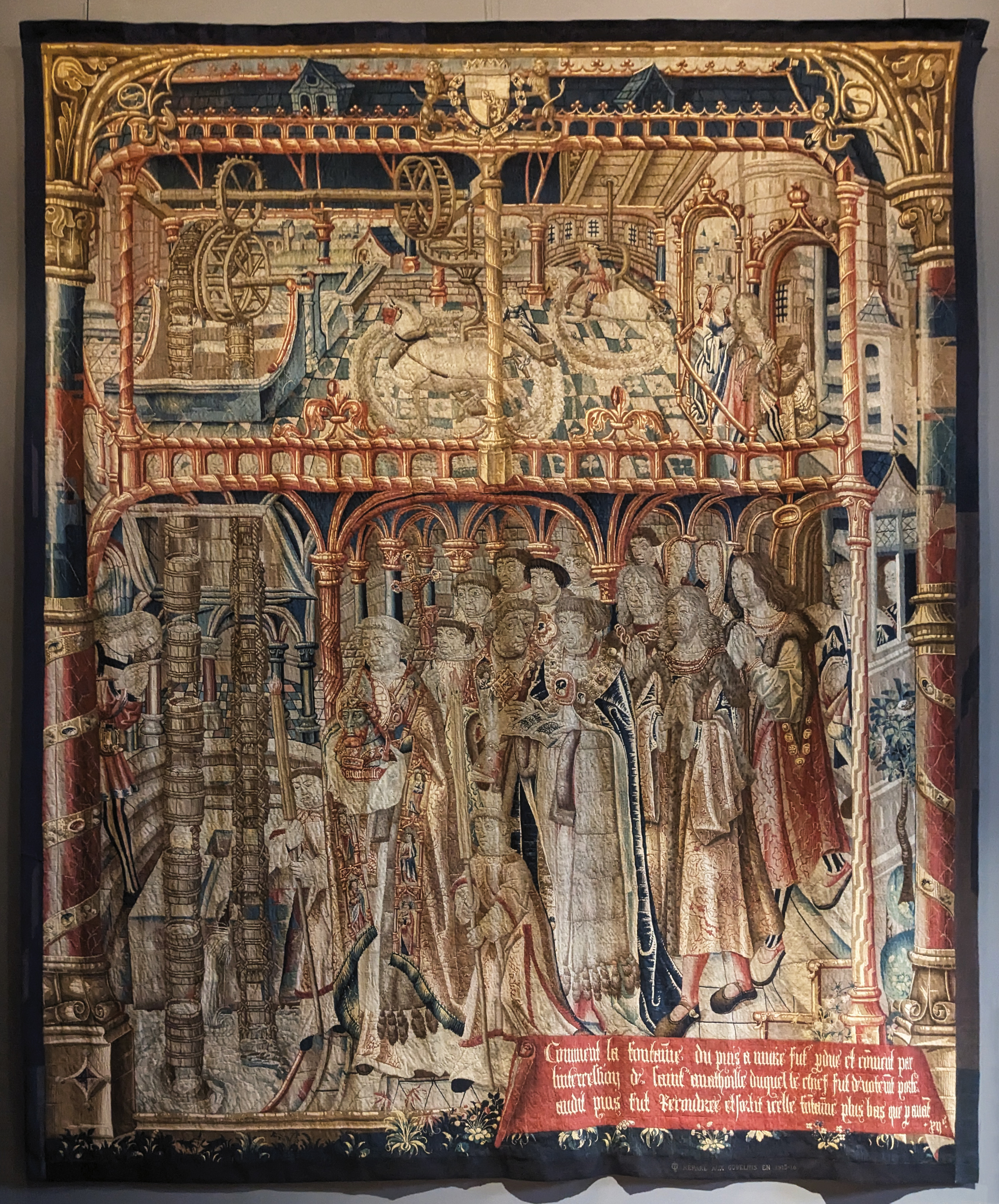
The Miracle of the Water, from Hasselet's tapestry series on the life of St Anatoile (1502-1506)

Katherine Hasselet (active around 1500) produced the oldest known surviving Flemish tapestries.

In 1502 she was commissioned to produce 14 tapestries depicting the life and miracles of St Anatoile for the collegiate church of St Anatoile in Salins (Franche-Comté), three of which are now in the Louvre. These are the oldest known extant Flemish tapestries. In 1506 the same chapter commissioned an antependium depicting the Three Kings.

Hasselet was married twice, first to Jan Smout, and after his death (before 1502) to Jan de Wilde.
