= Katherine Casey =

Katherine or Catherine Casey may refer to:

- Kathryn Casey, American writer
- Catherine Casey, the pseudonym of Fanny Jackson Coppin
