= Katherine Klein =

American psychologist

Katherine Klein is an American organizational psychologist. Her research covers issues related to employee stock ownership, innovation and technology implementation, leadership, diversity, teams, and social networks, as well as methodological considerations related to multilevel organizational theory and research.

== Career ==
Klein earned her B.A. in psychology (magna cum laude) from Yale University in 1978, and her Ph.D. in community psychology from the University of Texas at Austin in 1984. After completing her PhD, she joined University of Maryland, College Park as assistant professor, industrial and organizational psychology, eventually becoming associate professor, industrial and organizational psychology and an affiliate of the Robert H. Smith School of Business and a visiting associate professor at Stanford University Graduate School of Business. In 2004, she moved to Wharton School of the University of Pennsylvania, where she is an Edward H. Bowman Professor of Management.

She is the vice dean for the Wharton Social Impact Initiative (WSII) and a member of the Akilah Institute.

Klein runs Wharton's MOOC course Business Strategies for Social Impact on Coursera.

She is currently an associate editor of Administrative Science Quarterly and a Fellow of the Academy of Management and the Society for Industrial and Organizational Psychology.
