= Katherine Neville =

Katherine Neville may refer to:

- Katherine Neville (author) (born 1945), American author
- Katherine Neville, Duchess of Norfolk (c.1397 – c.1483), eldest daughter of Ralph Neville and Joan Beaufort
- Katherine Neville, Baroness Hastings (1442–1504), daughter of Richard Neville and the sister of Warwick the Kingmaker
