= Katherine Stewart =

Katherine Stewart may refer to:

- Kat Stewart, Australian actress
- Katherine Stewart (journalist), American writer
- Katherine Stewart Flippin (1906-1996), African American special educator
- Katherine Stewart-Jones, Canadian cross-country skier
- Katherine Stewart MacPhail (1887-1974), Scottish surgeon
- Katharine Stewart-Murray, Duchess of Atholl (1874–1960), British noblewoman and Scottish Unionist Party politician

== See also ==
- Catherine Stewart, New Zealand politician
