= Katherine Fraser =

Katherine or Kate Fraser (or similar) may refer to:

- Catherine Fraser (born 1947), Canadian lawyer and judge
- Katharine Fraser, 22nd Lady Saltoun (born 1957), Scottish noble
- Katherine Fraser (cricketer) (born 2005), Scottish cricketer
- Kate Fraser (announcer), British television announcer
- Kate Fraser (physician) (1887–1957), Scottish psychologist
