= Katherine Marlowe =

Katherine Marlowe may refer to:

- Katherine Marlowe, fictional character of the Uncharted franchise
- Katherine Marlowe (actress) (1914–2010), American film actress
