= Katherine Lloyd =

Katherine Lloyd (or similar) may refer to:

== TV ==
- Catherine Lloyd Burns, actress and writer
- Kathy Lloyd, Welsh glamour model and TV presenter

== Politics ==
- Katherine Lloyd, political candidate in Stevenage Borough Council election, 2011, England
- Catherine Lloyd, political candidate in 2003 National Assembly for Wales election

== See also ==
- Katie Lloyd, character in Boston Legal
- Kate Lloyd (disambiguation)
