= Katherine McLoughlin =

Irish Quaker preacher

- Katherine nic Lochlainn

Personal life
- Born: In or near Coleraine, County Londonderry, Ireland
- Died: c. 1677
- Spouse: Mr Norton
- Other names: Katherine Norton
- Occupation: Preacher

Religious life
- Religion: Quaker

Katherine McLoughlin (married name Norton; Irish: nic Lochlainn; fl. 1671 – c. 1677 (Note: Also cited as 1679.)) was a 17th century Irish Quaker preacher, active in the Colony of Barbados and Ireland.

== Early life and family ==
McLoughlin was born to a wealthy family in or near Coleraine, County Londonderry. McLoughlin may have been related to, or was the sister of, a protestant minister and a Roman Catholic priest.

Educated in Derry, McLoughlin learnt Gaelic. Aged 16, McLoughlin settled in the Colony of Barbados (present-day, Barbados) where she married Mr Norton.

== Quakerism ==
In 1671, a group of Quakers, including George Fox and William Edmundson, visited the Colony as part of their mission to establish Quakerism in the West Indies. Following her conversion by Fox, McLoughlin became a talented preacher and was described by a fellow Quaker as being of "great service here, and some were convinced by her and we had very large meetings".

In 1676, McLoughlin was a guest of Anthony Sharp, who was a successful wool merchant and Quaker in Dublin. He supported the establishment of the movement in America. Some of his other guests were bound for the Americas, but McLoughlin was due to travel to the northern counties of Ireland to preach in market places and in private houses. She wrote to Sharp in 1678 noting her welcome and the "innocent" people she was meeting. He had already noted her success in creating converts, including the wife of a judge.

The advancement of the Quaker movement was constrained by the language barrier, but McLaughlin knew Gaelic and preached in that language. There were few Quakers in Ireland at first, but they made an impact. McLouglin particularly attracted attention as a woman performing a public role. She had disputes and was open to abuse, but she preached in the Irish counties of Armagh, Cavan, Westmeath and Dublin. with success.

She left Ireland in 1677 en route for England, but no record has been found of her life after that.
