= Katherine Aaslestad =

American scholar (1961–2021)

- Born: Katherine Barbara Aaslestad; May 30, 1961; Bellefonte, Pennsylvania, U.S.
- Died: April 24, 2021 (aged 59); Morgantown, West Virginia, U.S.
- Occupation: scholar

Katherine Barbara Aaslestad (May 30, 1961 – April 24, 2021) was an American scholar. She was a professor of history at West Virginia University in the Department of History from 1997 to her death. Aaslestad died on 24 April 2021, aged 59.

Aaslestad completed her undergraduate education at the University of Mary Washington in Fredericksburg, Virginia. She studied with Paul Scroeder, Mary Lindemann, and John Lynn at the University of Illinois, where she wrote a dissertation on the city of Hamburg, Germany during the Revolutionary and Napoleonic periods.

== Awards and honors ==
She won the Caperton Award for Excellence in the Teaching of Writing and the Benedum Distinguished Scholar Award as well as outstanding teaching awards from the WVU Foundation, the Eberly College and the Honors College.

== Selected works ==
- The transformation of civic identity and local patriotism in Hamburg : 1790 to 1815, 1997
- Material identities : tradition, gender, and consumption in early nineteenth century Hamburg, 1998
- Place and Politics: Local Identity, Civic Culture, and German Nationalism in North Germany during the Revolutionary Era (Brill, 2005) ISBN 9780391042285
- Historica's women: 1000 years of women in history (Millennium House, 2007) ISBN 9781921209086
- Revisiting Napoleon's Continental System: Local, Regional and European Experiences (Palgrave Macmillan, 2015) ISBN 9781349466573
