= Katherine Edwards =

Katherine Edwards may refer to:

- Katherine Edwards Middle School California
- Cate Edwards, daughter of John Edwards
- Cathy Edwards (politician), Australian politician

== See also ==
- Edwards (surname)
