= Katherine Blair =

Katherine Blair or Kathryn Blair may refer to:

- Katie Blair (born 1987), American model and TV presenter
- Kathryn Blair, daughter of former British Prime Minister, Tony Blair
- Katherine Blair, character in The Night Flier (film)
- Kathryn Blair, pseudonym of Rosalind Brett (author)
