= Katherine Ward =

Katherine or Catherine Ward may refer to:

- Camberley Kate (Katherine Ward; 1895–1979), British dog lover and eccentric
- Catherine Ward (born 1987), Canadian ice hockey player
- Catherine George Ward (1787–after 1833), Scottish writer
- Kate Ward (born 1994), American deaf soccer player
- Kate Lucy Ward (1829–1915), British composer
- Katy Ward (born 1984), English footballer

== See also ==
- Ward (surname)
