= Katherine Winter =

Katherine Winter may refer to:

- Kathryn Winter, ice dancer
- Katherine Winter, a fictional character in The Reaping
