= Katherine Ruth Bridges =

American landscape architect

Katherine Ruth Bridges (born 1954) is an American landscape architect. In 2014 she is a landscape architect for the New York City Department of Parks and Recreation. She has been the principal landscape architect, and contributed to the design of over 50 parks in the New York City area. Her work includes the Blue Heron Park Preserve in Staten Island, New York, a large nature refuge that is part of Staten Island's "Blue Belt." Bridges' designs include elements of a site's natural systems, enhancement of wildlife habitats, and also its history.

== Early life and education ==
Bridges was born in 1954 in Manhattan. The family moved to Staten Island in 1960. Her mother is a retired New Dorp High School teacher, and her father was a Civil Engineer with Goodkind & O'Dea (now part of Dewberry).

Bridges attended Notre Dame Academy, Trinity Lutheran School, St Joseph by the Sea, and Curtis High School, graduating from the latter in 1972. She then went on to attend the University of Georgia in Athens, Georgia. In 1975 she participated in the UGA Studies Abroad Program in Cortona, Italy where she met Pietro Porcinai, a landscape architect with a studio in Fiesole, who would become a major influence. She also studied with Paolo Soleri. In 1977 Bridges participated in "Ecology", a three-hour special radio program broadcast on WUOG-FM in Athens, Georgia.

Bridges graduated from the College of Environment and Design at the University of Georgia in 1977 with a Bachelor of Landscape Architecture. Her undergraduate thesis was entitled Christus Gardens: A Design, and is a study of Christus Gardens, which was a public attraction in Gatlinburg, TN. She completed the Landscape Architecture Licensing Examination in 1981.

== Career ==
In 1984, Bridges was awarded the Merit Prize, at the UGA Studies Abroad Group Show, in Cortona, Italy. In summer 1984 and summer 1985 she was artist-in-residence at the UGA Cortona Program. During the period autumn 1984 to summer 1985, she was a consulting Landscape Architect at the Central Park Conservancy. She was registered as a landscape architect in the state of New York in 1986.

In 1986 she won First Prize in a competition for a Park Master Plan in Reggio Emilia, Italy. From July 1986 to December 1987 Bridges was a consulting Landscape Architect for projects in Florence, Italy; while there she edited a book about Pietro Porcinai, which was published by the Italian Association of Landscape Architects. From January 1988 to March 1989 she was a Landscape Architect at Quennell Rothschild & Partners.

Bridges was hired by the New York City Parks and Recreation in April 1989 and has worked there since. In 1991 she received a "Progressive Architecture" Merit Award for Flushing Meadow-Corona Park Master Plan from Quenell Rothschild Associates, and earned the NYC Parks & Recreation Commissioner Employee Recognition for the In-house Landscape Architecture Squad. In 1996 the NYC Art Commission presented her, jointly with Charles L. King, with an Award for Excellence in Design for Blue Heron Park Master Plan and Phase I. In 1999 Bridges received the NYC Parks & Recreation State of the Parks Best New Capital Project award.

From May 2000 to February 2008, Bridges was Brooklyn Borough Supervisor, in charge of Brooklyn Capital Park Projects, and was a member of the Horticultural Committee from May 2002 to August 2003. She has planned and supervised the construction of many parks in New York City, including Robert E. Venable Park in Brooklyn, which was completed in 2010. In 2010 she contributed to the study on sustainable practices for New York City parks.

In 2011 she designed and led the project to develop Canarsie Park.

Bridges appeared in a 2012 television advertisement for the AFL-CIO. That year she lectured about the Canarsie Park project at the 2012 meeting of the New Jersey chapter of the American Society of Landscape Architects.

In 2015 the Beverley Willis Architecture Foundation selected her design for Canarsie Park as a winner of the Built By Women - New York City (BxWNYC) award.

== Professional societies ==
Bridges has been a member of the American Society of Landscape Architects, the International Federation of Landscape Architects, the Executive Board of ASLA New York Chapter, and Executive Board of Staten Island Botanical Garden.

== Publications ==
- Prof. Pietro Porcinai - 1910-1986, 1986. (editor) Italian Association of Landscape Architects, Florence Italy
- "I1 Cantico delle Creature", ASLA Groundworks, NYC. 1985
- "Sowing Wildflowers", Parks Maintenance Magazine, Atlanta, GA, 1980
  - A Plan for Sustainable Practices within NYC Parks (contributor)

== Schoolhouse No. 5 ==
In 2010, Bridges purchased a 19th-century one-room schoolhouse in Hamden, New York, identified as Schoolhouse No. 5, and rehabilitated it using current preservation principles. The schoolhouse is now listed on the National Register of Historic Places.

== Personal life ==
Bridges lives on the lower east side of Manhattan. She is a certified yoga instructor, giving classes in NYC, and attends events at the Kripalu Center for Yoga. She trained at the American Viniyoga Institute. She is also a Marathon Runner, and completed the NYC Marathon in 1991, 1992, & 1993.
