= Katherine Tucker =

Katherine Tucker (or variants) may refer to:

- Kathryn Tucker, executive director for the Disability Rights Legal Center
- Kathryn Tucker (producer), American film producer and entrepreneur
- Catherine Tucker, American economist
- Katherine Tucker, character in Blue Bloods (season 6)

== See also ==
- Kate Tucker, musician
