= Katherine Salant =

American journalist and real estate writer

Katherine Salant is a journalist and nationally syndicated real estate newspaper columnist, author, and blogger whose most famous column "Housewatch" appeared in The Washington Post from 1994 onward.

Salant grew up in Northern Virginia and received her Bachelor of Arts from Wellesley College. In 1968, she went to Harvard University to study architecture and received a Fulbright scholarship in 1972. She has lived in Nepal, studying village housing.

In 1994, Salant began writing a column about the many facets of home owning for The Washington Post called "Housewatch" which has since become syndicated under the name "Your New Home" to over 40 media outlets, some of which include the Los Angeles Times, Chicago Tribune, San Francisco Chronicle, Houston Chronicle, The Denver Post, Miami Herald, Orlando Sentinel, and The Sacramento Bee.

== Critical reception ==
In a review of The Brand New House Book for the Chicago Tribune, Alan J. Heavens noted that "The typeface is annoying, but the advice – as is the case with all Salant's work – is absolutely sound." He highlighted her advice on how to avoid disasters during the construction process. Writing for the Orlando Sentinel, Robert Bruss praised Salant for doing "a great job overcoming the huge handicap of a badly designed book", arguing that the best part of the book is the first section on finding, building, and buying a new home.

The Pittsburgh Post-Gazette commended Salant's "admirable thoroughness" and grasp of financing a new home, but observed that she "tends to bury her best insights at the end of long paragraphs and essays". The Ottawa Citizen recommended the book, arguing that it "successfully crosses the border" and is helpful for Canadians buying a new home.

== Published works ==
- The Brand New House Book
- 4 Villages: Architecture in Nepal

== Awards and grants ==
- Fulbright Scholar, 1972–74
- National Endowment for the Arts Professional Fellow, 1980
- National Endowment for the Arts Design Communication Grant, 1981
- Missouri Lifestyle Journalism Award for Fashion and Design, 1995
- National Association of Real Estate Editors (NAREE), Best Column in 2012 and 2002, and runner up, four times
