= Katherine Hupalo =

Ukrainian-American actress (1890–1974)

- Born: May 1, 1890; Russian Empire
- Died: September 7, 1974 (aged 84); Ridgewood, New Jersey, United States
- Occupation: Actress
- Employer: Ukrainian Art Theatre

Katherine Hupalo (1890–1974) was an actress.

== Life ==
Katherine Hupalo was born to a Ukrainian family on May 1, 1890 in Ukraine, at the time part of the Russian Empire. For over four decades she was lead dramatic actress in the Ukrainian Art Theatre (US).

She died on September 7, 1974, at The Valley Hospital, Ridgewood, New Jersey.
