= Katherine Thompson =

Katherine Thompson may refer to:

- Katherine Rawls (1918–1982), American swimmer also known as Katherine Thompson
- Kate Thompson (author) (born 1956), British author of children's fantasy novels
- Katherine J. Thompson, American census statistician

== See also ==
- Katherine Thomson (disambiguation)
- Kathryn Thomson (born 1996), British short track speed skater
