= Katherine McKenzie =

American researcher

Katherine C. McKenzie is a professor of medicine at Yale School of Medicine and the Director of Yale Center for Asylum Medicine.

== Background ==
She established and directs the Yale Center for Asylum Medicine (YCAM). Through YCAM, she conducts forensic evaluations for asylum seekers at Yale and in detention facilities.

She collaborates with various organizations, including Physicians for Human Rights, Society for Refugee Healthcare Providers, Project Access New Haven, and Integrated Refugee and Immigrants Services.

McKenzie received the Leonard B. Tow Award for Humanism in Medicine and the Faculty Award for Achievement in Clinical Care.

== Selected publications ==
- Rosenberg, Julia; Edwards, Emily; Wang, Karen H.; McKenzie, Katherine C.; Asnes, Andrea G.; Young, Janine (August 2021). "Characteristics and scope of humanitarian relief forensic medical evaluations for immigrant children in the US". Journal of Forensic and Legal Medicine. 82 102221. doi:10.1016/j.jflm.2021.102221. PMID 34325082. S2CID 236516810.
- McQuaid, Jennifer H; Silva, Michelle Alejandra; McKenzie, Katherine C (March 2021). "Surviving violent, traumatic loss after severe political persecution: lessons from the evaluation of a Venezuelan asylum seeker". BMJ Case Reports. 14 (3) e239025. doi:10.1136/bcr-2020-239025. ISSN 1757-790X. PMC 7993358. PMID 33758042.
- McKenzie, Katherine C. (2020), "Medical Evaluation of Asylum Seekers", in Annamalai, Aniyizhai (ed.), Refugee Health Care, Cham: Springer International Publishing, pp. 303–310, doi:10.1007/978-3-030-47668-7_19, ISBN 978-3-030-47667-0
- McKenzie, Katherine C.; Emery, Eleanor Hope (July 2021). "Lessons from Asylum Seekers: How Forensic Medical Evaluations Can Teach Us Things We Didn't Learn in Medical School". Journal of General Internal Medicine. 36 (7): 2121–2122. doi:10.1007/s11606-020-06157-7. ISSN 0884-8734. PMC 8298660. PMID 32875493.
- McKenzie, Katherine C. (2020-07-28). "A Cruel COVID-19 Irony". JAMA. 324 (4): 345–346. doi:10.1001/jama.2020.11882. ISSN 0098-7484. PMID 32602892. S2CID 220272025.
- McKenzie, Katherine C.; Mishori, Ranit (September 2020). "Releasing Migrants from Detention During the Covid-19 Pandemic". Journal of General Internal Medicine. 35 (9): 2765–2766. doi:10.1007/s11606-020-05954-4. ISSN 0884-8734. PMC 7295322. PMID 32542498.
