= Katherine Grey =

Katherine Grey may refer to:

- Lady Katherine Grey (1540–1568), younger sister of Lady Jane Grey
- Katherine Grey (actress) (1873–1950), Broadway actress
