= Katherine Rake =

British academic

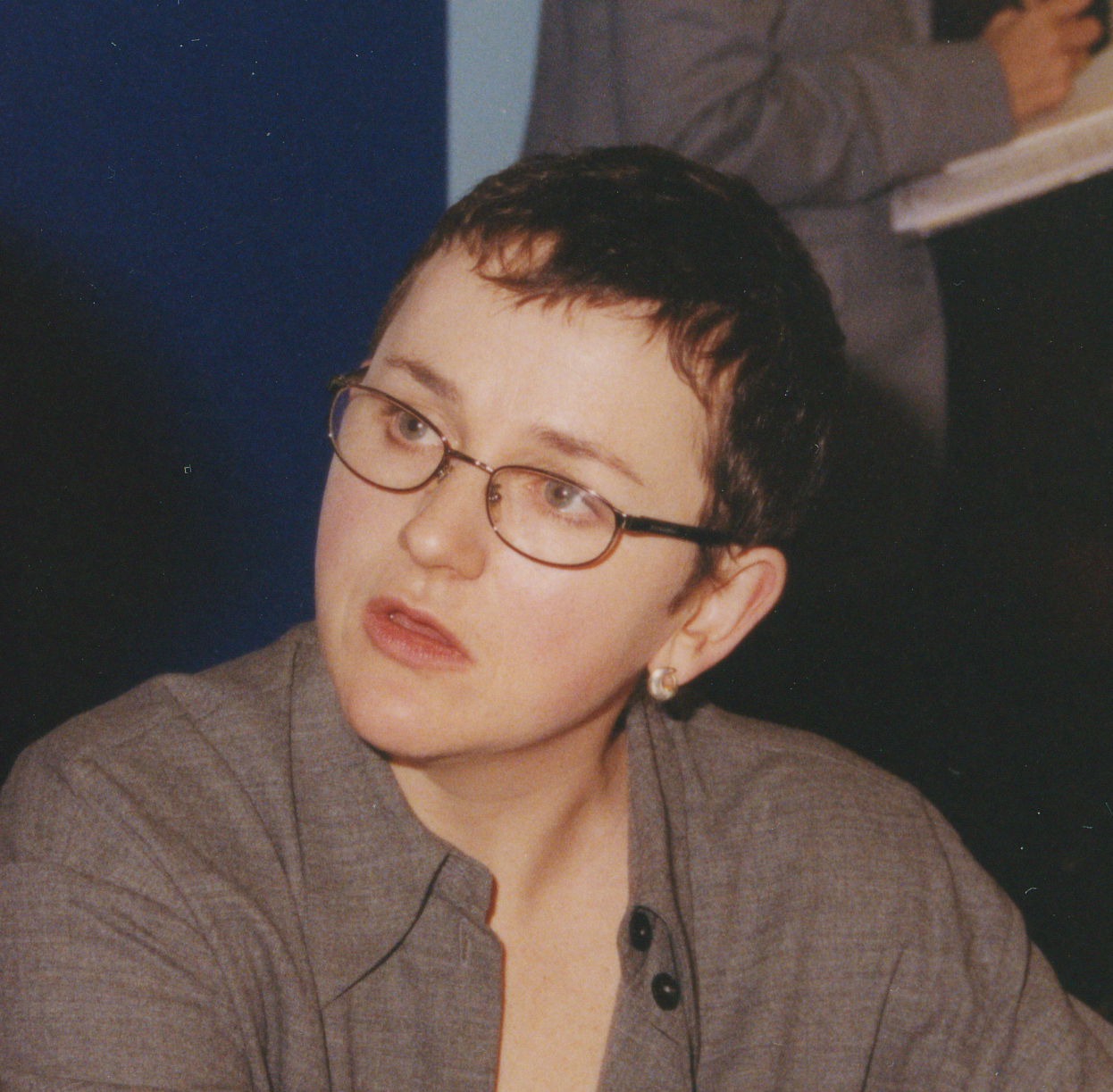
Katherine Rake, 2000

Katherine Rake OBE is director of Lucent, a consultancy supporting organisations with a social purpose to see clearly, make connections and inspire change. She was previously chief executive of HealthWatch England, the Family and Parenting Institute and the Fawcett Society. She is currently trustee of the charity United Response and has held a range of trustee and governing roles including as Governor of the London School of Economics, trustee of Centre for Ageing Better and Chair of RISE Mutual.

Katherine was formerly a lecturer in social policy at LSE during which time she was seconded to the Cabinet Office. Katherine has advised the Prime Minister's Policy Unit, HM Treasury and other Government departments. In 2002 she became a director of the Fawcett Society where she worked on an amendment to the Police Bill that meant local authorities would be able to refuse licenses to lap dancing premises. In 2008, Katherine was appointed an OBE for services to equal opportunities, an Institute of Directors 'Good Director' Honour and the Social Policy Association's Annual Award for Outstanding Contribution from a Non-academic.
