= Katherine A. McGlynn =

American cancer epidemiologist

- Education: Tulane University School of Public Health and Tropical Medicine; Perelman School of Medicine at the University of Pennsylvania
- Scientific career
- Fields: Cancer epidemiology, testicular dysgenesis syndrome, liver cancer
- Workplaces: Fox Chase Cancer Center; National Cancer Institute
- Doctoral advisor: W. Thomas London
- Other academic advisors: Edward D. Lustbader

Katherine Ann McGlynn is an American cancer epidemiologist who researches testicular dysgenesis syndrome and hepatocellular carcinoma. She is a senior investigator in the metabolic epidemiology branch of the National Cancer Institute. She was previously a faculty member at the Fox Chase Cancer Center.

== Life ==
McGlynn received a M.P.H. in population studies from Tulane University School of Public Health and Tropical Medicine. She completed a Ph.D. in epidemiology from the Perelman School of Medicine at the University of Pennsylvania. Her 1984 dissertation was titled Isoniazid and the hepatitis b carrier state in Southeast Asians in Philadelphia. W. Thomas London was her doctoral advisor and Edward D. Lustbader served as an advisor for statistical methods. She conducted postdoctoral research on liver cancer at the Fox Chase Cancer Center, where she subsequently served as a faculty member before coming to the National Cancer Institute (NCI) in 1998. She is a senior investigator in the NCI metabolic epidemiology branch in the division of cancer epidemiology and genetics (DCEG).

McGlynn uses different study designs to investigate environmental and genetic risk factors that may contribute to the increasing rates. She studies testicular dysgenesis syndrome (TDS) outcomes in complementary studies. Her TDS research includes maternal and son hormonal effects, endocrine-disrupting chemicals, and perinatal factors. McGlynn's TDS research focus is the relationship of steroid hormones and gonadotropins to the development of TDS outcomes. She also investigates the relationship of organochlorine compounds to several TDS outcomes. McGlynn researches liver cancer and whether medications such as non-steroidal anti-inflammatory drugs, 3-hydroxy-3-methylglutaryl coenzyme A reductase inhibitors, diabetes medications and other drugs affect risk of hepatocellular carcinoma.
