= Katherine Saunders =

English novelist

Katherine Saunders (or Katharine; later, Katherine Cooper; 1841-1894) was an English novelist of the Victorian era.

Saunders published fiction during the 1870s and 1880s. The eldest daughter of the writer John Saunders, she had 11 siblings. Saunders co-wrote the book Martin Pole (1863) with her father.

Saunders married the Rev. Richard Cooper in 1876.

== Selected works ==
- Martin Pole (1863) (with John Saunders)
- The Haunted Crust (1871)
- Margaret and Elisabeth: a Story of the Sea (1873)
- Joan Merry weather, and other Tales (1874)
- Gideon's Rock, and other Tales (1874)
- The High Mills (1875)
- Sebastian: a Novel (1878)
- Heart Salvage by Sea and Land (1884)
- Nearly in Port; or, Phoebe Mustyn's Life-Story (1886)
- Diamonds in Darkness: a Christmas Story (1838)
