= Katherine A. Lathrop =

American nuclear medicine pioneer

- Born: Katherine Gray Austin; June 16, 1915; Lawton, Oklahoma, U.S.
- Died: March 10, 2005 (aged 89); Las Cruces, New Mexico, U.S.
- Scientific career
- Fields: Nuclear medicine
- Workplaces: Argonne National Laboratory

Katherine Austin Lathrop (1915–2005) was an American nuclear medicine researcher, biochemist and member of the Manhattan Project. She conducted pioneer work on the effects of radiation exposure on animals and humans.

== Early career ==
Lathrop was born in Lawton, Oklahoma, on June 16, 1915. She attended Oklahoma A&M, where she earned bachelor of science degrees in biology in 1936 and physics in 19139. She met her husband, Clarence Lathrop, while they were both studying for master of science degrees in chemistry. They married in 1938 and had five children.

Upon completion of their master's degrees in 1939, the couple first moved to New Mexico and then to Wyoming in 1941. Lathrop became a research assistant at the University of Wyoming where she focused her efforts on research pertaining to poisonous plants that grew on the Great Plains. In 1944, Lathrop and her family moved to Chicago where Clarence pursued a medical degree at Northwestern University. They divorced in 1973.

== Involvement in the Manhattan Project ==
Upon hearing her husband's friend talking about a secret project at the University of Chicago that hired scientists, she applied and was hired in the Biology Division of the Metallurgical Laboratory. Lathrop, who previously avoided work that involved animal experimentation, was now studying the uptake, retention, distribution, and excretion of radioactive materials in animals. Lathrop's assignment in the project was to test the biological effects radiation had on animals. She worked on the Manhattan Project from 1945 to 1946.

== Post Manhattan Project ==
In 1947 after the Manhattan Project had been dismantled, Lathrop remained on staff at the lab as an associate biochemist as it was renamed Argonne National Laboratory. In 1954, tired of an exhausting commute, Lathrop left Argonne to pursue a career at the Argonne Cancer Research Hospital. It had opened in 1953 on the University of Chicago campus making it much closer to her home.

Lathrop was hired by the US Atomic Energy Commission facility as a research associate under the guidance of acclaimed researcher Paul Harper. Their goal was to find ways to manipulate radiation to allow for cancer detection and treatment. Their groundbreaking work on using the gamma camera to scan the body is a method still in practice to this day. The pair also discovered that Technetium 99-m could be used as a scanning agent.

She became a professor emeritus in 1985 and published her last paper in 1999 and then retired in 2000.

== Personal life ==
In addition to her research and teaching career, Lathrop was involved in national societies. In 1966, she helped establish the SNM Medical Internal Radiation Dose Committee. She also was the first person to teach radiation safety to workers that would come into contact with radioactive material. After semi-retirement, she became involved with the Daughters of the American Revolution and genealogy.

Lathrop retired in 2000 due to multiple cerebral ischemic attacks. She died in Las Cruces, New Mexico, on March 10, 2005, from complications caused by dementia. Lathrop had five children: four daughters and a son. She had 10 grandchildren at the time of her death.
