= Katherine Bennett (athletics) =

American track and field athlete (1922–2009)

Katherine Marie Howard Bennett (October 17, 1922 – December 20, 2009) was an African-American pioneer for women's collegiate athletics. Raised by a single mother in Elizabeth City, North Carolina, Bennett attended school where she found fun in extra curriculars such as debate, band, and drama club.

== Biography ==
She was born in Elizabeth City, North Carolina on October 17, 1922, and attended North Carolina A&T University and was one of the first female black athletes. She later became the physical education director at Virginia State University.

In the 1950s, Bennett authored the guidelines that led to women's sports being accepted in the Central Intercollegiate Athletic Association. She founded and coached Virginia State University's first female basketball team.

She was the first black female collegiate basketball referee in the state of Virginia. In 1987, she was inducted into the CIAA Hall of Fame, and in 1989, she was inducted into the VSU hall of fame.

Katherine married William "Pete" Bennett (1915–2007), a football and track and field All-American who played in the 1941 NFL-College Allstar game and who coached 48 track and field All-Americans and dozens of football All-Americans.

== College career ==
Katherine Bennett selected North Carolina A & T University to continue her education, attending from 1940 to 1944. It was there that she encountered a female in athletics which inspired her to involve herself in sports by researching athletics.

During her time at North Carolina A & T University, Katherine Bennett along with Mable Scott and Inez Scott became the designated performers of A & T's majorette team, twirling batons and competing with a floor routine. Bennett also expanded herself to join the universities drama club, band, debate team, and numerous sports such as: volleyball, tennis, and gymnastics teams.

Katherine Bennett continued her journey of athletics by joining the Women's Athletic Association and competed in events that were held for African American women athletes such as "National Sports Day." Bennett earned her diploma in 1944, specializing in Health and Physical Science as well as English. Not done enriching herself with education, Bennett moved on to Virginia Polytechnic University to earn a doctorate in 1977 specializing in physical education.

== Professional career ==
Bennett earned her Bachelor of Arts degree and continued her journey in athletics at Rosenwald School in South Mills, North Carolina as a Physical Education teacher. She furthered her time as a teacher and moved to Hampton Institute to teach health and physical education while leading the women's athletics program to greatness. In 1953, Bennett relocated her teaching career when her husband, William Bennett, took a job as the head football coach at Virginia State University. There she became a professor of health and physical education while working to create the Officiating Board and Women's Officials at Virginia State University. Later in the decade, Bennett polished her board and created guidelines that incorporated women's athletics in the Central Intercollegiate Athletic Association (CIAA). It took another ten years for Bennett to coach a women's team, though in 1968 the day had come. Bennett signed on to coach the first competitive women's basketball team at Virginia State University. The following years are accomplishments that stemmed from her success at VSU. In 1975, Bennett directed the first CIAA tournament for women's basketball located at Virginia State. In 1977, Bennett was chosen to represent VSU on the board for the Department of Health, Physical Education and Recreation. In the same year, Bennett was chosen to be the sole coordinator at VSU for women's sports. 1989 brought Bennett a great honor of being inducted into the Virginia Sports Hall of Fame, and only a mere three years later she retired from VSU in 1992.

== Personal Achievements ==
Katherine Howard Bennet's was a pioneer women's athletics and a college basketball coach. During her tenure as a coach, Katherine managed to integrate women's basketball into the Central Intercollegiate Athletic Association (CIAA). she chaired the department as a pioneer. Her works focused majorly on advocacy for female black college students. As a graduate with her B.A degree, in English health and physical education master's and doctorate in physical education, Bennett taught physical education at Rosenwald School. At the same time, she also added up as a physical education professor at Hampton Institute. Other than teaching, she also coordinated women's athletics program at Virginia State University (VSU). At VSU, Dr. H. Bennet also created a regulatory institution like the Officiating Board and Women's Officials. She was also a pioneer first woman in her capacity as first women to coach a competitive basket-ball team. She went on to become the first women to coordinate women's sports within the State of Virginia. Her success culminated in her being inducted into the Virginia Sports Hall of Fame. In an effort to promote sports related activities in the black community, Bennett worked as a referee in girls high school games. While working and promoting girl's high school games, she managed to become the president of Virginia State Association of Health and Physical Education, a position she used to oversee other milestones implemented. For instance, it is during her leadership as the president that Title IX legislation came into existence and ensured that Virginia Stated adhered to equal funding of women's teams.
