= Katherine Greacen Nelson =

American geologist (1913-1982)

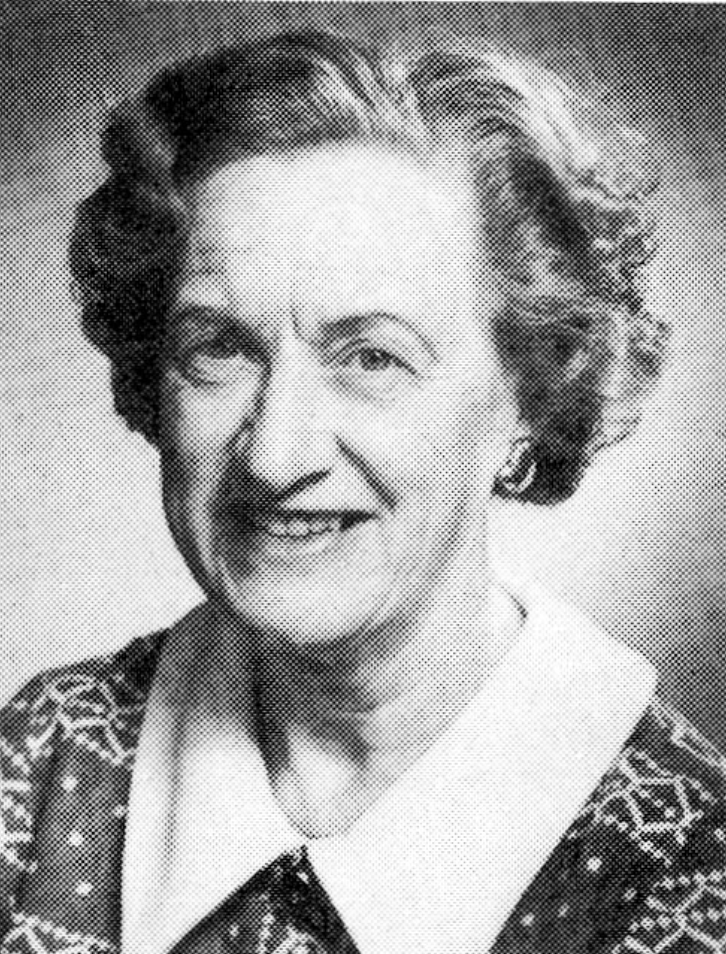
- Katherine Greacen Nelson
- Born: December 9, 1913; Los Angeles, California, U.S.
- Died: December 29, 1982 (aged 69); Milwaukee, Wisconsin, U.S.
- Education: Rutgers University
- Spouse: Frank Hurbert Nelson
- Scientific career
- Fields: Petroleum geology, invertebrate paleontology

Katherine Greacen Nelson (December 9, 1913 – December 29, 1982), born in Sierra Madre, California, was an American geologist. She was one of the first women to receive a degree in geology, obtaining a PhD from Rutgers University. Growing up in a military family exposed to nature and traveling at an early age, Nelson showed an eagerness for geology by devoting her days to learning the various geological processes that encompass the earth, eventually winning a prize for an excellence in geology from Vassar College.

She was later hired by Milwaukee-Downer College as part of college's expanding geological and geographical sciences department eventually leaving her position in 1943 to help as a petroleum geologist as part of the war effort. Nelson went on to give many lectures that helped inspire students of all genders towards the field of geography and geology. She died in December 1982 at the age of 69 in Milwaukee, Wisconsin after a long battle with cancer. Nelson was survived by her husband, Attorney Frank Hubert Nelson, her brother Robert A. Greacen. Having an impact on the lives of thousands of friends and former students across the world.

== Career and education ==
Katherine Greacen received her Bachelor of Science from Vassar College in 1934, being acknowledged for her excellence in geology. Katherine wrote several papers but was best known for the time she devoted teaching students about Earth, bussing kids down to the Greene Museum with the thought of a possible Ice Age Scientific Reserve in Wisconsin.

Four years after graduating from Vassar, Nelson attended Rutgers University and became one of the first women to earn a PhD in geology. Nelson went directly into teaching at Milwaukee-Downer College, as well as being the curator at the Thomas A. Greene Memorial Museum. During World War II, Nelson left teaching and began working in petroleum geology and palaeontology working for Shell Oil Co. (later transitioning to Hunt Oil Co.) as a way to help the war effort. At the end of WWII, she returned to Milwaukee-Downer College to continue teaching in both geology and geography. During her time teaching there she also spent time teaching at the Milwaukee-Downer Seminary and YWCA. In 1954 when the school merged with Lawrence College (under the name UW–Milwaukee), Nelson decided to once again leave Milwaukee-Downer College.

In 1956, the University of Wisconsin–Milwaukee obtained the Milwaukee-Downer campus. Due to her heavy involvement in both the museum and university, Nelson took the initiative to purchase the Greene Museum from Milwaukee-Downer. She created an active public education program for the less wealthy where more than 20,000 people have participated in its teachings. In this same year, Nelson was named the first faculty member and chair of the Department of Geological & Geophysical Sciences at the University of Wisconsin–Milwaukee. In 1978 Katherine was selected as the first woman to ever accept the prestigious Neil Miner award for her contribution the earth science. Nelson continued to be a part of the Governing board of the academy as well as being a nominee for the Earth Science Section of the American Association for the Advancement of Science until her death on December 29, 1982.

== Influence as a female geologist ==
Nelson was the first woman to graduate with a PhD in geology from Rutgers University and made many fundamental contributions in her field. She received numerous awards, including the Midwest Federation of Mineralogical & Geological Societies Educator of the Year Award in 1982, while working as a professor at University of Wisconsin–Milwaukee. At the time of Nelson's death she was one of the first women ever nominated for the Presidency of Chapter E in the latter society.

In 1978, she became the first woman to receive the Neil Milner Award, given for prestigious contributions to earth science education. She was also chosen as an honorary curator at the Milwaukee Public Museum. She purchased the Greene Museum from Milwaukee-Downer and put together a public teaching program that gave more than 20,000 people the opportunity to learn from her, Nelson had major influences on others lives through her teachings. The Nelson Award was created to honor her contributions to education in the field of geology.

== Community work ==
Nelson acted as a tour guide to students when visiting museums and offering information about the field, believing that her work should stem past college-education. She became deeply entrenched in the media by freely writing many newspaper articles as well as giving media interviews. She was devoted to helping geology hobbyists in their range of work by offering her knowledge to everyone. She was influential in the area of preserving glaciers as she explained the importance of Wisconsin's glacial feature to politicians, which would later lead to the establishment of the National Ice Age Scientific Reserve. Throughout all of this, Nelson inspired a new generation of geological interest in students.

In 1982, she was named Educator of the Year by the Midwest Federation of Mineralogical and Geological Societies owing to her many contributions to the geological community. At the time of her death, she was a nominee for president of Chapter E. She was also president of the Wisconsin Academy of Sciences, Arts, and Letters in 1952-53 making her the first female president of this organization.

On January 15, 1983, her colleagues honored her life by hosting a paleontological symposium that featured the work from several of her students. Papers of her students were published in a specialized memorial volume of Transactions of the Wisconsin Academy of Sciences, Arts, and Literature. Her department named and created a scholarship to honouring her.
