= Katherine McGregor =

Katherine McGregor (or similar) may refer to:

== Actors ==
- Katherine MacGregor (1925–2018), American actress a/k/a Scottie MacGregor
- Kate McGregor-Stewart (born 1944), American actress in Wonder Park
- Kate McGregor (born 1972), English actress known for Emmerdale

== Others ==
- Cathy McGregor (born 1955), Canadian legislator in British Columbia
- Cate McGregor (born 1956), Australian transgender writer and commentator
- Catherine MacGregor (born 1972), French business executive
- Katie McGregor (born 1977), American long distance runner
- Katharine MacGregor, American public official since 2000s
- Kate MacGregor (born 1991), English Olympic competitor in sailing

== Characters ==
- Kate "XO" McGregor, played by Lisa McCune on 2007 Australian TV drama Sea Patrol
