= Katherine Solomon =

American poet

Katherine Solomon is an American poet.

== Biography ==
Katherine Solomon was born and raised in Portsmouth, New Hampshire and attended college in Missouri. After living in Boston and Toronto, she met her husband on a commune in West Virginia, moved to the Bronx, and then back to New Hampshire with him. After years of raising two children and co-owning a business with her husband, she returned to school and earned an MFA from Vermont College in 1996.

== Literary career ==
In 2000, Solomon was the recipient of a NH State Council on the Arts Individual Artist Fellowship in 2000. She has been a member of the Skimmilk Poets for ten years, and has published poems in Green Mountains Review, The Worcester Review, the Spoon River Poetry Review, Color Wheel, and other journals and anthologies, and has a chapbook, "Tempting Fate," in the Oyster River Press chapbook series, "Walking to Windward." She taught for several years at the New Hampshire Community Technical College in Claremont, Springfield College, and at Elderhostel. She is working on a Sixties memoir.

Solomon's poems have been anthologized in "Orpheus & Company: Contemporary Poems on Greek Mythology," and "Under the Legislature of Stars: 62 New Hampshire Poets." She is the author of "Tempting Fate," a chapbook in the "Walking to Windward" series from Oyster River Press.
