= Katherine Manion =

American physician and suffragist

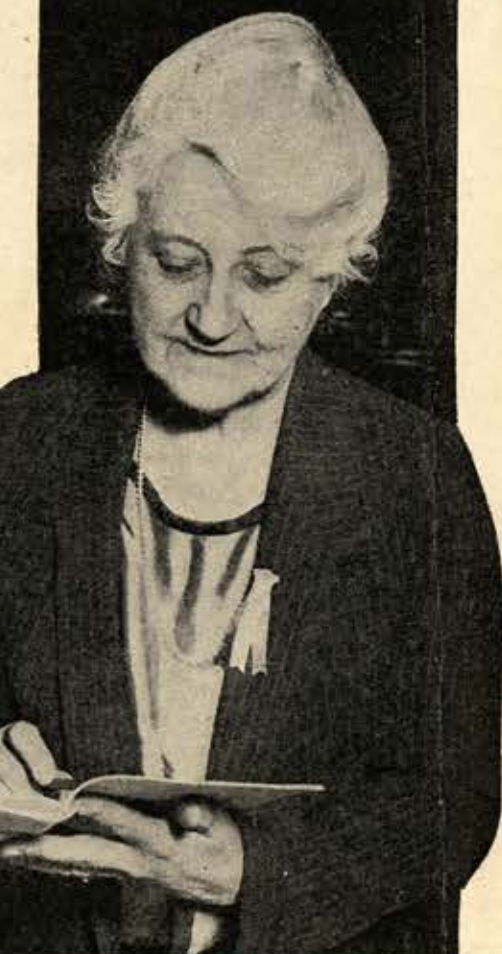
- Katherine Manion, from a 1925 publication
- Born: Katherine C. Galbraith; 1867; Walla Walla, Washington
- Died: 1956 (aged 88–89); Coronado, California
- Occupation: Physician

Katherine C. Galbraith Manion (1867–1956) was an American physician and suffragist. She and three other women challenged the United States Army's ban on women doctors during World War I. She was elected president of the Medical Women's National Association in 1924.

== Early life and education ==
Katherine Galbraith was born in Walla Walla, Washington Territory in 1867. She was married to James Manion and they had a son.

She graduated from St. Mary's Academy in Portland, Oregon in 1888 and then from the University of Oregon with honors in 1903.

== Medicine and professional work ==
Manion began her medical career specializing in women's and children's diseases. She was an active member of the medical society and joined the Medical Club of Portland, a coalition of female physicians, which she served as the secretary of in 1905 and president in 1908. The Medical Club was the first women's medical society in the West.

She also served as the Portland chapter president of the University of Oregon Alumnae Association in 1906 and 1908, as well as treasurer of the Oregon State Medical Society and Portland City and County Medical Societies.

== Suffrage and women's equality ==
Manion was an active part of the successful campaign for women's suffrage in Oregon in 1912. That same year she was tasked with distributing women's literature for the Portland Branch of the College Equal Suffrage Association in which she served on the board.

== Enlisting in the Army Medical Reserve Corps ==
In the patriotic fervor of World War I, Manion and three of her fellow female physicians, Mae Cardwell, Mary MacLachlan, and Emily Balcom attempted to enlist in the Army Medical Reserve Corps in May 1918. Women made up 6% of the country's doctors at the time. The four physicians collected portfolios that included their diplomas, licenses, and references from patients, which they presented to a major at the Vancouver Barracks training camp in Washington. The women said they had the right to enlist on the basis of being citizens, a title newly granted to women through suffrage in Oregon in 1912. They asserted that, “There is no word in the war department regulations that bars women,” meaning that the war department required fit “citizens,” a term that was not gendered. Finding no other reason, the major denied the women the right to enlist because, “it hasn’t been done.”

Instead the major suggested they volunteer as nurses, a job that was not commissioned; the women refused and were turned away, but the case had gained national attention. Their case was brought to the Surgeon General in Washington D.C, William Crawford Gorgas who affirmed the major in Vancouver's decision. Manion still regarded their effort as a success because they had challenged the Army's policies.

== Death ==
Manion retired in 1935 and moved to Coronado, California where she died in 1956 at 92.
