= Cold Spring Harbor Laboratory School of Biological Sciences =

Graduate school at Cold Spring Harbor Laboratory

Coordinates: 40.85793°N 73.46694°W

- Type: Private
- Established: 1998
- Dean: Alexander Gann
- Academic staff: 53
- Students: 50
- Location: Cold Spring Harbor, NY, United States
- Campus: Suburban
- Website: gradschool.cshl.edu

The Cold Spring Harbor Laboratory School of Biological Sciences, formerly known as the Watson School of Biological Sciences (WSBS) until 2020, is a biological sciences graduate school at Cold Spring Harbor Laboratory. The school was opened in 1999 and resides on the Laboratory campus in Cold Spring Harbor, New York on Long Island.

The school offers a graduate degree (PhD) in molecular biology in an accelerated program that strives for completion within four years. The diverse student body includes about 50 percent international students.

== History ==
The school was formerly named after James Watson, co-discoverer of the structure of DNA and then president of the laboratory, shortly after its founding. On July 1, 2020, the board of trustees voted to return the name of the school to the "Cold Spring Harbor Laboratory School of Biological Sciences" because of Watson's views on race.

The founding dean of the school is Winship Herr, then professor at the University of Lausanne since 2004.
