= Katherine Teck =

American author, composer, and guild founder

Katherine Weintz Teck (born December 31, 1939) is an American author, composer, and founding member of the International Guild of Musicians in Dance.

== Life and career ==
Teck was born in Mineola, New York, to Helen Elliot Bennett and Walter Henry Weintz. She has three brothers and one sister. Her father owned the Weintz Company, a direct mail company.

Teck earned an A.B. in music from Vassar College, an M.A. in composition from Columbia University where she was a Seidl Fellow, and a certificate in arts management at Purchase College (State University of New York). She also studied at the Mannes College of Music and with Harry Berv and Greg Squires.

Teck has held a number of arts management jobs, freelanced as a French horn player, and worked as a studio musician for ballet and creative dance. A founding member of the International Guild of Musicians in Dance, she was given the organization's Louis Horst Lifetime Achievement Award in 2012. She taught several college courses in music with dance departments and has written books and articles about music for theatrical dance.

== Books ==
- Appreciating Ballet's Music (website historical essays and resource guide) available free at https://www.appreciatingballetsmusic.com 2022
- Making Music for Modern Dance: Collaboration in the Formative Years of a New American Art (Katherine Teck, editor) (2011) Oxford University Press ISBN 9780199743209
- Ear Training for the Body: A Dancer's Guide to Music (1994) Princeton Book Company/Dance Horizons ISBN 9780871271921
- Movement to Music: Musicians in the Dance Studio (1990) Greenwood Press ISBN 9780313272882
- Music for the Dance: Reflections on a Collaborative Art (1989) Greenwood Press ISBN 9780313263767

== Music ==
- Suite for Small Orchestra
