= Katherine Forbes =

Katherine Forbes may refer to:

- Kathryn Forbes (1908–1966), American writer
- Katherine Stewart Forbes (1818 ship), barque that carried convicts to Australia and migrants to New Zealand

== See also ==
- Cathi Forbes, member of the Maryland House of Delegates
- Cathy Forbes (disambiguation)
- Dame Katherine Trefusis-Forbes (1899–1971), Air Chief Commandant
