= Katherine Thomson =

Katherine Thomson may refer to:

- Katherine Thomson (Australian writer), Australian playwright and screenwriter
- Katherine Thomson (English writer), English novelist and historian

== See also ==
- Katherine Thompson (disambiguation)
