= Katherine Woodville =

Katherine Woodville may refer to:

- Katherine Woodville (actress) (1938–2013), British film and television actress
- Catherine Woodville, Duchess of Buckingham (1458–1497), English medieval noblewoman, sister of Elizabeth Woodville, the queen of Edward IV of England
- Katherine Neville, Duchess of Norfolk (1397–1483), later Woodville, English courtier of royal descent
