= Katherine Beaumont =

Katherine Beaumont may refer to:

- Kathryn Beaumont (born 1938), English actress
- Katherine Neville, Duchess of Norfolk (c. 1400–1483), English noblewoman
