= Katherine Wood =

Katherine or Catherine Wood may refer to:

- Katherine Ellis, née Wood, English dance music vocalist and songwriter
- Catharine Wood (born 1973), American composer, musician and producer
- Catherine Jane Wood (1841–1930), English nurse
- Catherine Marshall, née Wood, American author
- Cathie Wood, CEO and CIO of ARK Invest
- Catherine Wood, fictional character in A Man Called Peter

== See also ==
- Katie Wood, American figure skater
