= Katherine Jungjohann =

Scientist and engineer

- Education: Ph.D., Materials Science and Engineering
- Alma mater: University of California, Davis
- Occupation: Group Leader
- Employer: National Renewable Energy Laboratory
- Website: https://www.nrel.gov/research/staff/katherine-jungjohann.html

Katherine Jungjohann is a group leader at the National Renewable Energy Laboratory (NREL) and previously worked as a scientist and engineer at the Center for Integrated Nanotechnologies (CINT) which is part of Sandia National Laboratories in Albuquerque, New Mexico, United States.

== Biography ==
=== Early life ===
Jungjohann grew up in an academic family.

=== Education ===
Jungjohann received her Bachelor of Science degree in chemistry with honors from the University of Redlands, California, in 2008. She completed her Doctor of Philosophy degree in materials science and engineering at the University of California, Davis, CA in 2012.

=== Career ===
Jungjohann finished off a postdoctoral fellowship at the Center for Functional Nanomaterials at Brookhaven National Laboratory before beginning a staff position at the Center for Integrated Nanotechnologies at Sandia National Laboratories in 2013. In 2021, Jungjohann joined the National Renewable Energy Laboratory (NREL) as a group manager.

=== Distinctions ===
- Nano Letters - Early Career Advisory Board (2016-2017)
- Microscopy Society of America's Focused Interest Group on Electron Microscopy in Liquids and Gases - Co-leader and Placement Office Chair
- Materials Research Society - Member, Speaker
- American Chemical Society - Member
- American Association for the Advancement of Science - Member

== Publications ==
Jungjohann has over 150 publications. Her most cited work has been cited over 300 times.

Here is a sampling of her most cited works, each one has been cited more than 100 times:

- Controlled growth of nanoparticles from solution with in situ liquid transmission electron microscopy

JE Evans, KL Jungjohann, ND Browning, I Arslan (2011)

- In situ transmission electron microscopy study of electrochemical sodiation and potassiation of carbon nanofibers

Y Liu, F Fan, J Wang, Y Liu, H Chen, KL Jungjohann, Y Xu, Y Zhu, D Bigio, ... (2014)

- Experimental procedures to mitigate electron beam induced artifacts during in situ fluid imaging of nanomaterials

TJ Woehl, KL Jungjohann, JE Evans, I Arslan, WD Ristenpart, ... (2013)

- In situ liquid cell electron microscopy of the solution growth of Au–Pd core–shell nanostructures

KL Jungjohann, S Bliznakov, PW Sutter, EA Stach, EA Sutter (2013)

- In situ liquid-cell electron microscopy of silver–palladium galvanic replacement reactions on silver nanoparticles

E Sutter, K Jungjohann, S Bliznakov, A Courty, E Maisonhaute, S Tenney, ... (2014)

- Atomic-scale imaging and spectroscopy for in situ liquid scanning transmission electron microscopy

KL Jungjohann, JE Evans, JA Aguiar, I Arslan, ND Browning (2012)

- Lithium Electrodeposition Dynamics in Aprotic Electrolyte Observed in Situ via Transmission Electron Microscopy

AJ Leenheer, KL Jungjohann, KR Zavadil, JP Sullivan, CT Harris (2015)

== See also ==
- Sandia National Laboratories
- Los Alamos National Laboratory
- Lawrence Livermore National Laboratory
