= Katherine Hilgenberg =

American musician and opera director

Katherine Hilgenberg (December 29, 1920 – March 18, 1988) was a Broadway performer, university voice teacher and opera director.

At 12 years old, Hilgenberg became a church soloist. Between 1955 and 1961, she engaged in more than 35 roles as a contralto. At the University of Michigan School of Music, she taught the mezzo-contralto Cadence de Lattre. She worked with the San Francisco Opera Company for six years, mastering over 30 operas – unprecedented in the organization's history. She also performed with the Los Angeles Opera Company, Los Angeles Opera Guild, St. Paul and Dallas Civic Operas. Hilgenberg was noticed by the conductor of the Los Angeles Philharmonic, Alfred Wallenstein. From there, she worked with other famous conductors including Otto Klemperer, Artur Rodziński, William Steinberg and Igor Stravinsky. On retiring in 1986, she was praised by Michigan University regents for "earning distinction as a pedagogue that matched that of her earlier accomplishments as a performer". Two years later, she was appointed associate professor emeritus there. She received the $1,500 prize at the national Atwater Kent Auditions.
