= Katherine Morgan =

Katherine Morgan is the name of:

- Kathryn Morgan, ballet dancer
- Kathy Morgan, a character in Spellbinder: Land of the Dragon Lord

== See also ==
- Katie Morgan (born 1980), American actress
- Kate Morgan (1865–1892), alleged ghost
