= Katherine Collins (disambiguation) =

Katherine Collins (born 1947) is a writer.

Katherine Collins (or variants) may also refer to:

- Catherine Collins, fictional character in Bunty
- Catherine Collins, fictional character in Six Feet Under played by Harriet Sansom Harris

== See also ==
- Kate Collins (disambiguation)
