= Katherine Ng (book artist) =

Book artist in Southern California

Katherine Ng is a book artist and letterpress printer in Southern California whose work often references her Chinese-American heritage.

Ng is an alumna of the Women's Building and California State University, Northridge. She went on to be an educator, teaching at Otis College of Art and Design and serving as the director of the letterpress studio at the Armory Center for the Arts in the 1990s. Some of her artists' books are published under the imprint Pressious Jade.

== Artists' books ==
- Aa: Alphabetical Afflictions (2000)
- Spirit vessel (1997)
- A Hypothetical Analysis of the Twinkle in Stars (as Told by a Child to His Teacher) (1994)
- Fortune Ate Me (1994)
- Banana Yellow (1992)
  - description and images of this book are featured in "From Site to Vision: the Woman's building in Contemporary Culture"
- The Book of Chain (1992)
- Kitchen Cricket (1991)

== Exhibitions ==
- 2019-2021, Poetry Is Not a Luxury, Center for Book Arts, NY, San Francisco Center for the Book, Minnesota Center for Book Arts
- 2014, Word-Up: Interactions Between Images and Text, Huntington Beach Art Center
- 2014, Binding Desire: Unfolding Artists Books, Ben Maltz Gallery
- 2007, Touched, Armory Center for the Arts
- 2002, SO CALled Books, UCLA
- 1997, Outlooks, CSUN Art Dome
