= Katherine Martínez =

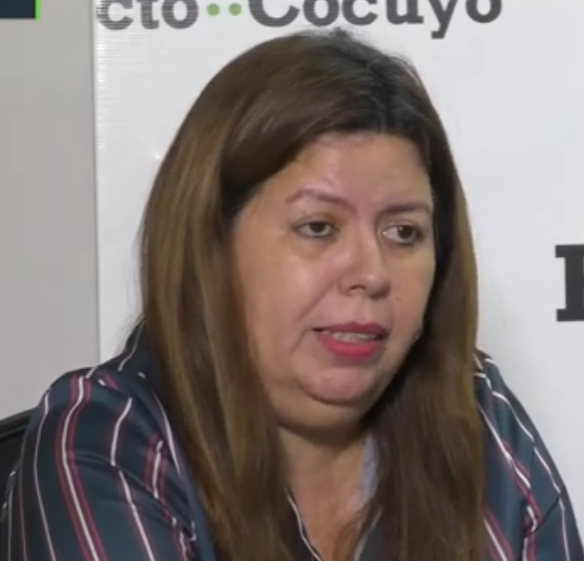
- On an Efecto Cocuyo program in 2019
- Born: La Pastora Parish, Caracas, Venezuela
- Education: Central University of Venezuela
- Occupation(s): Lawyer, activist

Katherine Martínez is a Venezuelan lawyer, activist, and human rights defender. In 2008, she founded the NGO Prepara Familia, which is dedicated to defending the human rights of hospitalized children and adolescents with chronic conditions at the J. M. de los Ríos Children's Hospital in Caracas, as well as of female caregivers. In 2024, she was recognized as one of the most influential women in the world on the BBC's 100 Women list.

== Early life and career ==
Katherine Martínez was born in La Pastora Parish, Caracas. She began her law studies at the Central University of Venezuela (UCV) at age 16. Over the next five years, she volunteered at the UCV legal clinic, created with the support of the National Association of Voluntary Legal Clinics and Assistance (Asocliva) and the Catholic Church, with headquarters in La Pastora. After graduating, she worked as an independent lawyer and continued doing community work.

As part of this, from 2002 to 2007, she was part of women's groups that provided assistance to mothers, grandmothers, and sisters who cared for minors admitted to the J. M. de los Ríos Children's Hospital in Caracas. In 2007, she began working with women victims of gender violence, and in 2013, she founded the organization Una Luz Frente a la Violencia y el Maltrato (A Light in the Face of Violence and Abuse).

In 2008, Martínez founded the NGO Prepara Familia, with the aim of strengthening assistance with medical supplies, training for mothers, legal support and accompaniment, and the creation of cultural and recreational activities at the J. M. de los Ríos Children's Hospital. As a response to the high levels of malnutrition caused by the ongoing crisis in Venezuela, Prepara Familia created a center in 2020 to offer free vitamins and supplements to children and pregnant women. In addition, they began keeping a record of human rights violations against children and the women who care for them in the hospital environment, advising victims to demand that the relevant laws be complied with. They have also advocated for reactivation of the Venezuelan Organ and Tissue Procurement System, suspended since 2017, because according to figures from Prepara Familia, at least 75 children and adolescents with chronic diseases died while waiting for transplants between 2017 and 2022.

As a human rights defender, Martínez sought injunctions against the Venezuelan government before the Inter-American Commission on Human Rights (IACHR) due to the health crisis experienced in the country since 2014, and aggravated in 2017 by an infectious outbreak which killed children who were patients at the J. M. de los Ríos Hospital. In February 2018, the IACHR agreed to request precautionary measures for children in the nephrology unit, and expanded these to 13 more of the hospital's units in August 2019. As Martínez had been subjected to threats, intimidation, and harassment since 2017, in August 2020, with the support of the Center for Justice and Peace (Cepaz) and Acción Solidaria, the IACHR also requested protective measures for her, after considering that she faced "a serious, urgent risk of suffering irreparable damage to her rights." They asked the Venezuelan government to adopt all necessary measures for the protection of her life and personal integrity and the investigation of the facts.

== Recognition ==
Katherine Martínez was recognized in 2019 with the Human Rights Award from the Canadian Embassy in Venezuela and the UCV's Father Luis María Olaso Center for Peace and Human Rights, a distinction that has been granted to people and institutions that promote and defend human rights since 2009.

In 2024, she was included as one of the most influential women in the world on the BBC's 100 Women list, for her humanitarian work focused on children's health and support for women caregivers. She was recognized along with 14 other women from Latin America, and prominent figures such as Nadia Murad and Gisèle Pelicot.
