= Katherine Losse =

Katherine Losse is an American writer and was Facebook employee 51. Her memoir The Boy Kings: A Journey Into the Heart of the Social Network (Free Press, June 2012) is an account of her time as one of Facebook's first employees. While working at the social media company, her roles included working in customer support and international development, and being ghostwriter for CEO Mark Zuckerberg.

== Facebook (2005-2010) ==
Losse was hired by Facebook in 2005 as its 51st employee. At first, her job was primarily as a customer service representative. In her book, The Boy Kings: A Journey Into the Heart of the Social Network, she notes that most of her co-workers were white, male, and Ivy League graduates. She also discusses how, at the time, the main focus of the company was merely growth and scalability. In 2009, Mark Zuckerberg hired Losse as his ghost writer.

Throughout her book, Losse gives an overview of the novel work environment at Facebook. From the beginning, she mentions that she believes she was originally hired due to "the fact that Johns Hopkins featured prominently on [her] resume". This is one of many examples of Facebook being a primarily Ivy League-run company.

During her first years at Facebook, Losse spent time answering basic customer support questions, as well as handling groups that were potential bullies. While handling such cases, the question of "when something was hate speech, free speech, a political disagreement, or some combination thereof," became difficult to distinguish. On the internet, blatantly rude or racist opinions seemed easier for some to express.

She stresses how Facebook constantly pushed to be a fun-filled environment, not just an ordinary work company, but something different and unique. This led to expectations such as socializing during breaks and going to expensive summer houses.

During her last year at Facebook, Losse ended up working as Mark Zuckerberg's personal ghost writer. She became his public voice online, until her identity was revealed by Gawker.

== Works ==
Since publishing her memoir, Losse has contributed essays on technology and culture to publications such as the New York Times, The New Yorker, and Dissent magazine. One of these essays was a critique of Facebook COO Sheryl Sandberg's book Lean In. After the critique appeared in Dissent magazine, Brandee Barker — former head of Facebook public relations, and part of the Lean In publicity campaign — messaged Losse, "There's a special place in hell for you." Losse publicly posted a picture of the message, which was picked up by a number of media outlets. In 2014, Losse published her article "The Male Gazed" to Model View Culture, in which she discussed the nature of privacy on social networks and the power of information.

== Feminist beliefs ==
Both Katherine Losse's works The Boy Kings: A Journey Into the Heart of the Social Network and her article "The Male Gazed" express her strong feminist values. She criticizes the use of social networks, such as Facebook, for essentially allowing stalking to happen over the web with relative ease. The main people being looked at on such social media websites are females, while the main people doing the looking are males.

Losse argues that social media has become a tool to spy on people, and somehow, this has become the norm.
