= Katherine Mayfield =

American writer

- Born: St. Louis, Missouri
- Website: www.katherine-mayfield.com

Katherine Mayfield is a memoirist, short story writer, poet, and nonfiction author. Born in 1958 in St. Louis, Missouri, she was an actress in New York in the 1980s and '90s, and appeared Off-Broadway and on the daytime drama, Guiding Light. She has written for national magazines, local newspapers, and numerous websites, and has received funding from the Maine Arts Commission. She appeared on the NBC TV show "207" in 2013 to talk about her book, Bullied: Why You Feel Bad Inside and What to Do About It.

== Awards ==
Mayfield's memoir on recovery from emotional abuse, The Box of Daughter, won awards in both the 2012 New England Book Festival and the 2012 Reader's Favorite Awards, and was nominated as a Finalist in the 2013 Maine Literary Awards. Her short story, "The Last Visit", which is based on the last time she visited her father in hospice care, won the Honorable Mention award in the 2011 Warren Adler Short Story Contest.

== Works ==
- Bullied: Why You Feel Bad Inside and What to Do About It. 2013, Maine Authors Publishing
- The Box of Daughter: Healing the Authentic Self. 2012, Maine Authors Publishing
- Dysfunctional Families: The Truth Behind the Happy Family Facade. 2012, The Essential Word Press
- The Box of Daughter & Other Poems. 2011, The Essential Word Press
- Acting A to Z: The Young Person’s Guide to a Stage or Screen Career, 2nd Edition. 2007, Watson-Guptill / Back Stage Books
- Acting A to Z: The Young Person’s Guide to a Stage or Screen Career. 1998, Watson-Guptill / Back Stage Books
- Smart Actors, Foolish Choices: A Self-Help Guide to Coping with the Emotional Stresses of the Business. 1996, Watson-Guptill / Back Stage Books
