= Katherine Roberts =

Katherine Roberts may refer to:

- Katherine Roberts (author), English author
- Katherine Roberts (television personality), American golf fitness instructor
- Kathryn Roberts (born 1974), English folk singer

== See also ==
- Kate Roberts (disambiguation)
