= Katherine Monbiot =

- Katherine Monbiot, 1993 Armwrestling World Champion

Personal information
- Nationality: British
- Born: 1964
- Died: 1997 (aged 32–33)
- Weight: 55–60 kg (121–132 lb)

Sport
- Sport: Arm wrestler
Medal record
Gold medal – first place	1993 World Armwrestling; Championship Edmonton, Canada	Women Right 55 kg
Silver medal – second place	1993 European Armwrestling; Championship, London	Women Right
Bronze medal – third place	1993 British Armwrestling; Championship, Islford	Women Right 60 kg

Katherine Monbiot (1964–1997) was an English former World Champion armwrestler, active vegan and dietary nutritionist. In 1993, she was the women World Champion for armwrestling in 55 kg, right hand category.

== Biography ==
Born in 1964, Monbiot was an active vegan, dietary nutritionist and colonic irrigationist. She was the Chairwoman of the International Colonic Association.

In 1993, Monbiot participated in several armwrestling competitions. She achieved third place in the British Arm wrestling Championships held in The Island, Ilford, in Ladies Right 60 kg category. In the 1993 European Arm wrestling competition held in London, England, she received second place in her category. In October 1993, Monbiot participated in the World Armwrestling Championship held in Edmonton, Canada, and was declared the world champion in Ladies Right, 55 kg category.

In 1995, Monbiot was working as a hydrotherapist at Hale Clinic in London and was the chairwoman of the Colonic International Association. Monbiot died in May 1997, at the age of 33 as a result of injuries she sustained after having slipped in her bathroom.
