= Katherine Usher Henderson =

American college professor (1937–2022)

- Katherine Usher (later Henderson), from a 1959 newspaper
- Born: Katherine Ann Usher; June 9, 1937; Fall River, Massachusetts
- Died: July 26, 2022 (aged 85); California
- Education: Connecticut College (BA); New York University (MA); Harvard University (MA); Columbia University (PhD)
- Occupations: College professor, college administrator

Katherine Ann Usher Henderson (June 9, 1937 – July 26, 2022) was a college professor and administrator. She was president of Point Park University in Pittsburgh, Pennsylvania, from 1997 to 2005.

== Early life and education ==
Usher was born in Fall River, Massachusetts, the daughter of Merritt Munroe Usher and Mabel Josephine Reagan Usher. She graduated from Connecticut College with a bachelor's degree in 1959, and earned two master's degrees, at New York University and Harvard Graduate School of Education, before completing her doctoral studies in English and comparative literature at Columbia University in 1969.

== Career ==
Usher taught at the College of New Rochelle for 14 years. During her time there, she was dean of the School of Arts and Sciences, and director of the women's studies program. She was vice president for academic affairs at Dominican University of California. From 1997 to 2005, she was president of Point Park College in Pittsburgh, which became Point Park University during her administration. She returned to California in 2007, as director of the Osher Lifelong Learning Institute (OLLI). She retired as director of the OLLI in 2021.

In 2005, Henderson was named a Distinguished Daughter of Pennsylvania, with the commendation that "Her distinguished career manifests a strong work ethic, integrity in action and significant leadership in her profession".

== Publications ==
- Joan Didion (1981)
- Half Humankind: Contexts and Texts of the Controversy about Women in England, 1540–1640 (1985, with Barbara F. McManus)
- Inter/View: Talks with America's Writing Women (1990, with Mickey Pearlman)
- Meanings of the Medium: Perspectives on the Art of Television (1990, edited with Joseph Anthony Mazzeo)
- A Voice of One's Own: Conversations with America's Writing Women (1992, with Mickey Pearlman)

== Personal life ==
In 1959, Katherine Usher married F. Tracy Henderson Jr., an investment consultant. They had three children. She died on July 26, 2022, in California.
