= Katherine Creag =

Filipino-American television journalist (1973–2021)

- Born: December 26, 1973; Philippines
- Died: February 10, 2021 (aged 47); New York City, U.S
- Education: New York University
- Occupation: Television journalist
- Years active: 1996–2021
- Spouse: Bill Gafner (m. 2006)
- Children: 3

Katherine Creag Gafner (December 26, 1973 – February 10, 2021) was a Filipino-American television journalist. She worked for WNBC for a decade prior to her death. Before that, she worked for NY1, WTVH, and WNYW. She won several awards for her journalism.

== Early life and education ==
A native of Manila, Philippines she was born on December 26, 1973, to Valentino and Cecilia Creag. The family eventually moved to Warsaw, Indiana, and she went to high school in Chicago. She attended New York University for her undergraduate degree in journalism, and graduated in 1996.

== Career ==
Creag started her news career at the NY1 channel in New York City. There, she reported on the 7th on Sixth fashion shows, TWA Flight 800, and the trials stemming from the Crown Heights riot. She later recounted that the most memorable interview she conducted during her tenure there was with John F. Kennedy Jr. She went on to work for WTVH (CBS 5) in Syracuse, New York, from 1998 until 2000. After leaving CBS, Creag was employed by WSOC-TV in Charlotte, North Carolina, as well as KDFW (Fox 4) in Dallas. She worked for WNYW (Fox 5 New York) starting in March 2005. She reported for the channel's Good Day New York and Fox 5 Midday newscasts.

Beginning in 2011, Creag became a news reporter for WNBC television in New York City. She reported primarily for Today in New York, the channel's morning news show that aired from 4:30 a.m. to 7:00 a.m., and again at 11:00 a.m. She also worked on the Saturday and Sunday programs Weekend Today in New York and News 4 New York at 6:00 p.m. and 11:00 p.m.

=== Awards ===
Throughout her career, Creag received several awards – both shared and outright – for her individual reporting and as part of a news team. These included an Emmy Award, Edward R. Murrow Award, and an Associated Press award.

== Personal life ==
Creag married Bill Gafner on September 2, 2006, at the Church of St. Ignatius Loyola in Manhattan. The couple had two daughters and one son.

== Death ==
Creag died on the night of February 10, 2021. She was 47, and was not ill prior to her death.

Creag's cause of death was announced as a result of a sudden cardiopulmonary incident.

== See also ==
- Filipinos in the New York City metropolitan region
- List of New York University alumni
- List of people from New York City
- List of television reporters
