= Katherine Safford Harris =

American psychologist

Katherine Safford Harris is a noted psychologist and speech scientist. She is Distinguished Professor Emerita in Speech and Hearing at the CUNY Graduate Center and a member of the Board of Directors of Haskins Laboratories. She is also the former President of the Acoustical Society of America and Vice President of Haskins Laboratories.

== Career ==
Working with Alvin Liberman, Franklin S. Cooper and colleagues at Haskins Laboratories in the 1950s , the Pattern playback, a mechanical speech synthesis device, was used to help uncover the acoustic cues for the perception of phonetic segments (consonants and vowels). Liberman, Harris and colleagues proposed a motor theory of speech perception. Harris went on to lead the speech production program at Haskins Laboratories. In the 1960s Harris and colleague Peter MacNeilage were the first researchers in the U.S. to use electromyographic techniques, pioneered at the University of Tokyo, to study the neuromuscular organization of speech. In the 1970s, 1980s and 1990s Katherine Harris continued her pioneering work on speech production with colleagues Gloria Borden, Frederica Bell-Berti and many others. Of particular note is work on coarticulation that examined the phasing and cohesion of articulatory speech gestures.

She received degrees from Radcliffe College and Harvard University.

== Awards ==
- In 1988 she won Honors of the Association from the American Speech-Language-Hearing Association, recognizing "contributions to the field of speech, language, and hearing," and the highest honor that the Association gives.
- In 2005 she won the Silver Medal in Speech Communication from the Acoustical Society of America "for research and leadership in speech production."
- In 2007 she won the ASA Gold Medal from the Acoustical Society of America "for pioneering research and leadership in speech production and dedicated service to the Society"

== Selected publications ==
- Bell-Berti, F., & Harris, K. S. (1979). Anticipatory coarticulation: Some implications from a study of lip rounding. Journal of the Acoustical Society of America, 65, 1268–1270.
- Bell-Berti, F., & Harris, K. S. (1981). A temporal model of speech production. Phonetica, 38, 9-20.
- Borden, G. J., Harris, K. S., & Oliver, W. (1973). Oral feedback I. Variability of the effect of nerve-block anesthesia upon speech. Journal of Phonetics, 1, 289–295.
- Borden, G. J., Harris, K. S., & Catena, L. (1973). Oral feedback II. An electromyographic study of speech under nerve-block anesthesia. Journal of Phonetics, 1, 297–308.
- Casper, M.A., Rapheal, L.J., Harris, K.S., & Geibel, J.M. (2007). Speech prosody in cerebellar ataxia. "International Journal of Language and Communication Disorders", 1-20.
- Harris, K. S. (1958). Cues for the discrimination of American English fricatives in spoken syllables. Language and Speech, 1, 1–7.
- Harris, K. S., Hoffman, H. S., Liberman, A. M., Delattre, P. C., & Cooper, F. S. (1958). Effect of third-formant transitions on the perception of the voiced stop consonants. Journal of the Acoustical Society of America, 30, 122–126.
- Harris, K. S., Rosov, R., Cooper, F. S., & Lysaught, G. F. (1964). A multiple suction electrode system. Electroencephalography and Clinical Neurophysiology, 17, 698–700.
- Harris, K. S., Lysaught, G. S., & Schvey, M. M. (1965). Some aspects of the production of oral and nasal stops. Language and Speech, 8, 135–147.
- Harris, K. S. (1970). Physiological measures of speech movements: EMG and fiberoptic studies. ASHA Reports, 5, 271–282.
- Harris, K. S. (1971). Children's language development and articulatory breakdown. In D. L. Horton & J. J. Jenkins (Eds.), Perception of Language (pp. 207–215).
- Harris, K. S. (1972). Silent articulation. Science, 176, 1114–1115.
- Harris, K. S. (1977). The study of articulatory organization: Some negative progress. In M. Sawashima & F. S. Cooper (Eds.), Dynamic aspects of speech production. Tokyo: University of Tokyo Press, 71–82.
- Harris, K. S. (1978). Vowel duration change and its underlying physiological mechanisms. Language and Speech, 21, 354–361.
- Harris, K. S. (1982). Electromyography as a technique for laryngeal investigation. Conference on the assessment of vocal pathology, National Institutes of Health, Bethesda, MD, April 1979. ASHA Reports, 11, 70–86.
- Harris, K. S., & Bell-Berti, F. (1984). On consonants and syllable boundaries. In L. Raphael, C. R. Raphael, & M. R. Valdovinos (Eds.), Language and Cognition (pp. 89–95). New York: Plenum.
- Liberman, A. M., Cooper, F. S., Harris, K. S., & MacNeilage, P. F. (1962). A motor theory of speech perception. Proceedings of the Speech Communication Seminar, Stockholm.
- Liberman, A. M., Cooper, F. S., Harris, K. S., MacNeilage, P. F., & Studdert-Kennedy, M. (1967). Some observations on a model for speech perception. In W. Wathen-Dunn (Ed.), Models for the perception of speech and visual form (pp. 68–87). Cambridge, MA: MIT Press.
