= Katherine Reynolds Lewis =

American journalist and author

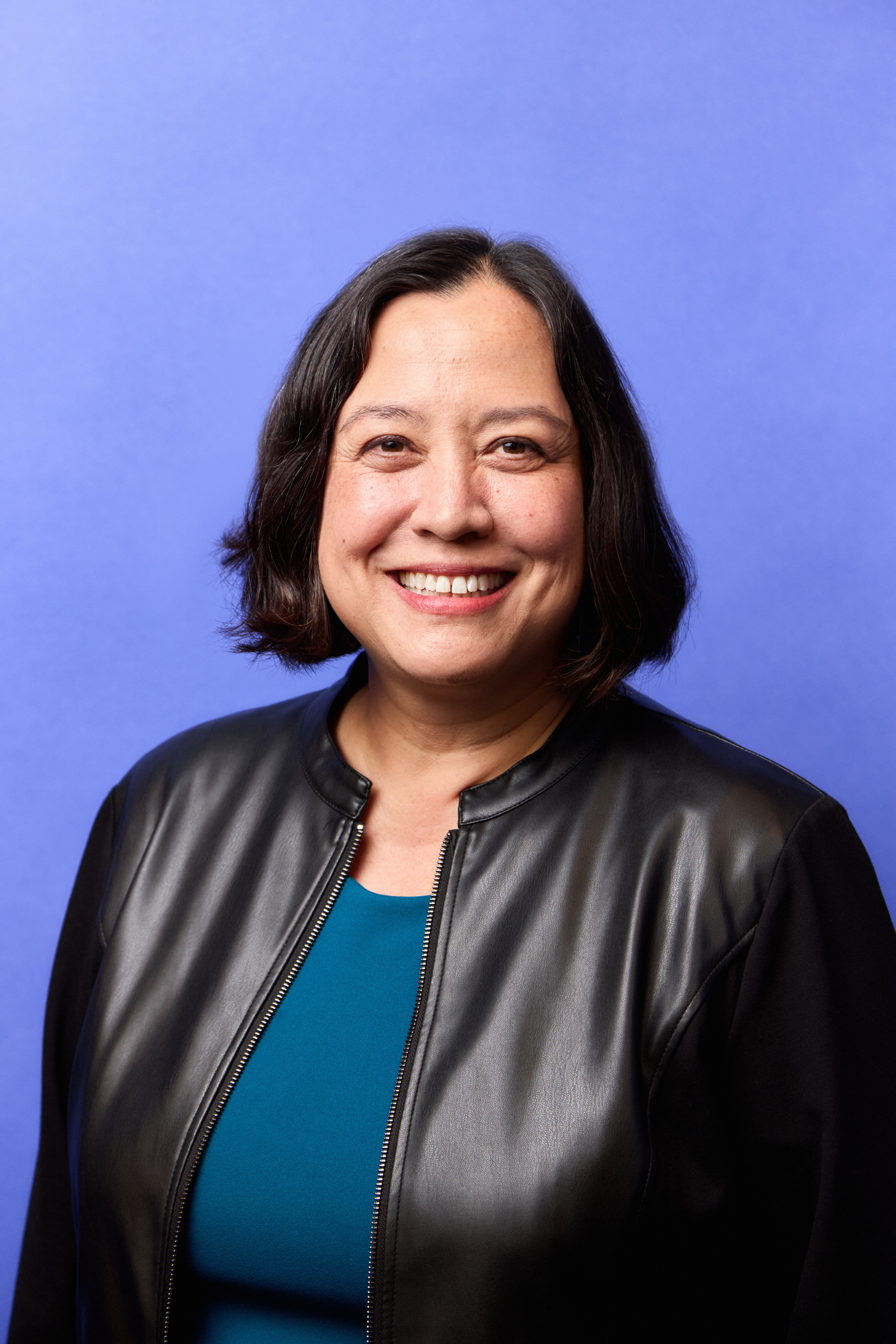
- Occupation: Journalist
- Spouse: Brian Lewis
- Children: 3
- Website: www.katherinerlewis.com

Katherine Reynolds Lewis is an American journalist and author.

== Life ==
Born as Katherine Mary Reynolds, Lewis attended Phillips Exeter Academy in 1990 and graduated from Harvard University with a bachelor's degree in physics. She worked as a national correspondent for Newhouse News Service and as a national reporter for Bloomberg News and contributes to Fortune magazine, USA Today's magazine group, The Washington Post, Working Mother magazine, Time, and The Huffington Post. Lewis had her nuptials with Brian Lewis in 2001, having three children.

Her first book, The Good News About Bad Behavior: Why Kids Are Less Disciplined Than Ever -- And What to Do About It was published by PublicAffairs in April 2018.
