= Katherine A. Fitzgerald =

Irish-born American molecular biologist and virologist

Katherine Fitzgerald
- Born: Katherine A. Fitzgerald; Ireland
- Citizenship: United States of America
- Education: University College Cork, Trinity College Dublin
- Scientific career
- Thesis: Signal transduction processes regulating CD44 expression and CD44-mediated changes in pro-inflammatory gene expression (1999)

Katherine Anne Fitzgerald is an Irish-born American molecular biologist and virologist. She is a professor of medicine currently working in the Division of Infectious Disease at the University of Massachusetts Medical School. She is also the director of the Program in Innate Immunity.

== Education ==
Fitzgerald received her B.Sc. degree in biochemistry in 1995 from University College Cork. She received her Ph.D. in 1999 from Trinity College Dublin, studying with Luke O'Neill. Following her Ph.D., she was postdoc at Trinity College Dublin until 2004 when she moved to the University of Massachusetts Medical School.

== Research ==
Fitzgerald is known for her research in the field of innate immunity and the biology behind inflammatory responses in diseases. She conducts research on many aspects of innate immunity such as the molecular basis of pathogen recognition, the innate immunity to malaria, and the impact with diseases such as lupus or rheumatoid arthritis. In 2021, Fitzgerald published results on an antiviral option to block replication in SARS-CoV-2, the viral agent responsible for COVID-19.

== Awards and honors ==
In 2011, Fitzgerald was a finalist for the Vilcek Prize for Creative Promise in Biomedical Science. In 2015, she was awarded the Science Foundation Ireland (SFI) St. Patrick's Day Science Medal, and she is the first woman to win the award. She has been recognized by Clarivate as a Highly Cited Researcher in the field of immunology by Clarivate every year from 2014 to 2021 for being in the top 1% of authors cited in her field. In 2020, she was admitted into the Royal Irish Academy, one of Ireland's most prestigious academic bodies, and was elected to the American Academy of Microbiology. In 2021 she was elected to the United States' National Academy of Sciences and the National Academy of Medicine.

== Selected publications ==
- Fitzgerald, Katherine A.; Palsson-McDermott, Eva M.; Bowie, Andrew G.; Jefferies, Caroline A.; Mansell, Ashley S.; Brady, Gareth; Brint, Elizabeth; Dunne, Aisling; Gray, Pearl; Harte, Mary T.; McMurray, Diane (2001). "Mal (MyD88-adapter-like) is required for Toll-like receptor-4 signal transduction". Nature. 413 (6851): 78–83. Bibcode:2001Natur.413...78F. doi:10.1038/35092578. ISSN 0028-0836. PMID 11544529. S2CID 4333764.
- Fitzgerald, Katherine A.; Rowe, Daniel C.; Barnes, Betsy J.; Caffrey, Daniel R.; Visintin, Alberto; Latz, Eicke; Monks, Brian; Pitha, Paula M.; Golenbock, Douglas T. (6 October 2003). "LPS-TLR4 Signaling to IRF-3/7 and NF-κB Involves the Toll Adapters TRAM and TRIF". Journal of Experimental Medicine. 198 (7): 1043–1055. doi:10.1084/jem.20031023. ISSN 1540-9538. PMC 2194210. PMID 14517278.
- Hornung, Veit; Ablasser, Andrea; Charrel-Dennis, Marie; Bauernfeind, Franz; Horvath, Gabor; Caffrey, Daniel. R.; Latz, Eicke; Fitzgerald, Katherine A. (2009). "AIM2 recognizes cytosolic dsDNA and forms a caspase-1-activating inflammasome with ASC". Nature. 458 (7237): 514–518. Bibcode:2009Natur.458..514H. doi:10.1038/nature07725. ISSN 0028-0836. PMC 2726264. PMID 19158675.
