= Katherine Boyle =

British archaeologist

Katherine Victoria Boyle FSA is a zooarchaeologist. She is a Fellow of, and Director of Studies in Archaeology & Anthropology, at Homerton College, Cambridge. She was elected as a Fellow of the Society of Antiquaries of London on 6 June 2010.

== Select publications ==
- Boyle, K. 1990. Upper Palaeolithic Faunas from South West France: A Zoogeographic Perspective. (BAR International 557). Oxford, BAR
- Boyle, K. 1998. The Middle Palaeolithic Geography of Southern France: Resources and Site Location (BAR International 723). Oxford, BAR
- Renfrew, C.; Boyle, K., eds. (2000). Archaeogenetics: DNA and the Population Prehistory of Europe. Cambridge: McDonald Institute for Archaeological Research.
- Mellars, P., K. Boyle, O. Bar-Yosef, & C. Stringer (eds) 2007. Rethinking the Human Revolution. Cambridge, McDonald Institute for Archaeological Research
- Boyle, K., C. Gamble & O. Bar-Yosef (eds.) 2010. The Upper Palaeolithic Revolution in Global Perspective: Essays in Honour of Paul Mellars. Cambridge, McDonald Institute for Archaeological Research.
