= Katherine T. Hooper Prescott =

American sculptor

- Born: Katherine Tupper Hooper; June 17, 1851; Biddeford, Maine
- Died: January 8, 1926 (aged 74); Boston, Massachusetts
- Known for: Sculpture
- Spouse: Harry Lawson Prescott

Katherine Tupper Hooper Prescott (June 17, 1851 – January 8, 1926) was an American sculptor. She worked primarily in plaster.

== Biography ==
Prescott née Hooper was born on June 17, 1851, in Biddeford, Maine. After she was widowed at age 36 from her husband Harry Lawson Prescott, she and her three children moved to Boston where she began studying sculpture. She also studied in New York with Francis Edwin Elwell. Prescott was a member of the Copley Society of Art and the Boston Art Students Association.

Prescott exhibited her work at the Palace of Fine Arts and The Woman's Building at the 1893 World's Columbian Exposition in Chicago, Illinois.

Following her success at the Exposition she exhibited at the Boston Art Club, the National Academy of Design in New York, and the Art Institute of Chicago as well as the National Sculpture Society and the Pennsylvania Academy of the Fine Arts.

Prescott was also a published poet.

Guise died on January 8, 1926, in Boston, Massachusetts. She is buried in Mount Auburn Cemetery in Cambridge, Massachusetts. Her works are in the Saco Museum located in the J.G. Deering House in Saco, Maine.
