= Katherine Scanlon Lewis =

American rower

Katherine Lewis Scanlon (born August 25, 1970) is an American rower. In the 1995 World Rowing Championships, she won a gold medal in the women's coxless four event. She also won silver medals in both the 1993 and 1994 World Rowing Championships in the women's eight event.
