= Catherine of England =

Catherine of England or Queen Catherine of England may refer to:

- Catherine of Valois (1401–1437), queen consort of Henry V, King of England
- Catherine of Aragon (1485–1536), first queen consort of Henry VIII, King of England
- Catherine Howard (c. 1523 – 1542), fifth queen consort of Henry VIII, King of England
- Catherine Parr (c. 1512 – 1548), sixth queen consort of Henry VIII, King of England
- Catherine of Braganza (1638–1705), queen consort of Charles II, King of England

== See also ==
- Katherine Tudor (disambiguation)
  - Katherine Tudor (1503), youngest child of Henry VII, King of England
- Princess Catherine (disambiguation)
  - Catherine, Princess of Wales (born 1982), wife of William, Prince of Wales, heir of United Kingdom (which includes England)
  - Katherine of England (1253–1257), youngest child of Henry III, King of England
- Queen Catherine (disambiguation)
  - Catherine of Lancaster (1373–1418), fourth daughter of John of Gaunt and queen consort of Henry III, King of Castile
