= Stephen McGann =

British actor (born 1963)

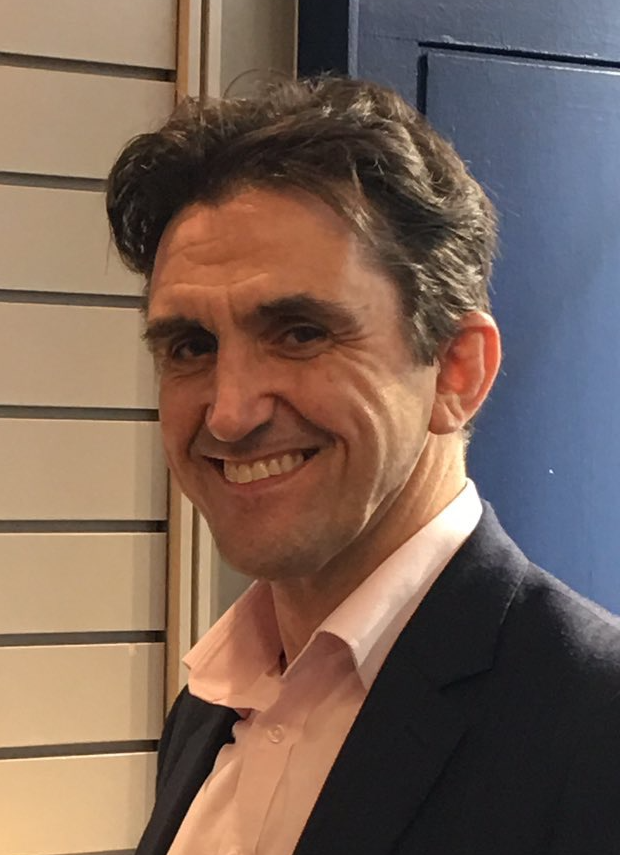
- McGann in 2017
- Born: Stephen Vincent McGann; 2 February 1963 (age 63); Kensington, Liverpool, England
- Education: Imperial College London
- Occupation: Actor
- Years active: 1983–present
- Spouse: Heidi Thomas (m. 1990)
- Children: 1
- Family: Joe McGann (brother); Paul McGann (brother); Mark McGann (brother); Joseph McGann (nephew)

Stephen Vincent McGann (born 2 February 1963) is an English actor, best known for portraying Dr Patrick Turner in the BBC One medical period drama series Call the Midwife. He is one of a family of acting brothers, the others being Joe, Paul, and Mark.

McGann was born in Kensington, Liverpool, and began his professional acting career in 1982, starring in the West End musical Yakety Yak. He has since worked extensively in British theatre and on screen.

== Early life ==
Stephen's father Joe was a Royal Naval Commando who died in 1984, and his mother, Clare, was a teacher. Along with his acting brothers Paul, Mark, and Joe who is named after his father, he also has a younger sister named Clare after their mother.

== Career ==
=== Acting ===
In 1989, he starred as Mickey in the West End hit musical Blood Brothers. In 1990, he played Johann Strauss in the international mini-series, The Strauss Dynasty. In 1993, he created, co-produced and starred in the award-winning BBC drama The Hanging Gale. He portrayed the character of Sean Reynolds in Emmerdale from 1999 to 2002.

In 2003, he starred with Jamie Theakston in the hit West End play 'Art'. In 2006, he played the role of the Reverend Shaw in the original West End cast of the musical Footloose. He can currently be seen playing Dr. Turner in BBC TV series Call the Midwife.

=== Science communicator ===
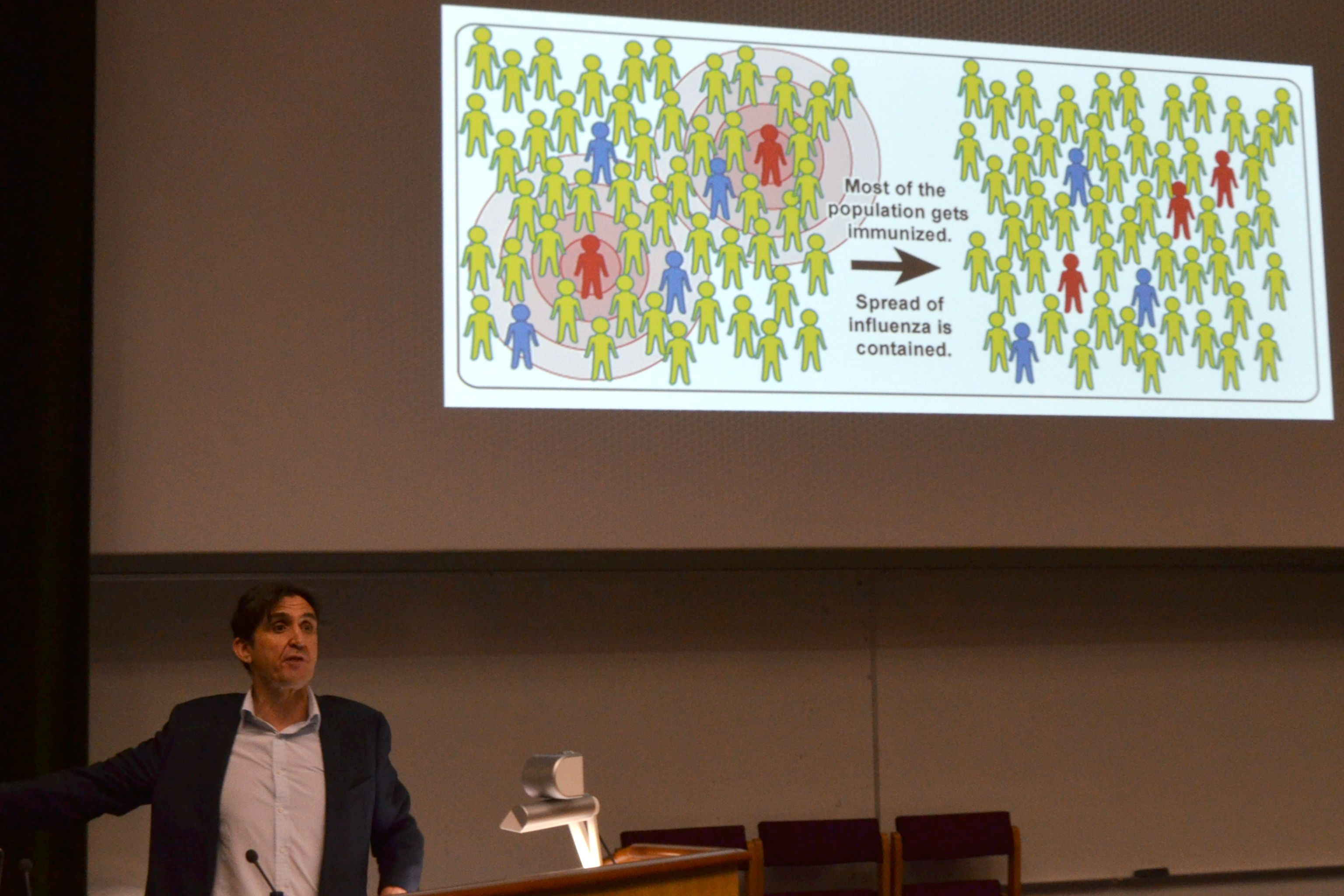
Stephen McGann explaining herd immunity at the 2015 Cambridge Science Festival

In addition to his acting, McGann is a public speaker and science communicator. He graduated from Imperial College London with a Master's degree in Science Communication.

He was a guest speaker at the Cambridge Science Festival in March 2015. He published a guest essay in the Journal of the Royal Society of Medicine in April 2015, discussing issues of medical accuracy and communication in Call the Midwife.

In January 2016, McGann published a companion book to Call the Midwife called Doctor Turner's Casebook, in which he revisits key medical cases featured in the TV series and discusses their historical and social contexts. The BBC screened a documentary special based on the book, titled Call the Midwife: The Casebook, on 15 January 2017.

In July 2017, McGann published Flesh and Blood: A History of My Family in Seven Maladies, a personal history of his family over a century and a half as told through the medical ailments they suffered.

McGann was a member of the judging panel for the 2019 Royal Society Insight Investment Science Book Prize., and holds an honorary doctorate from the University of Liverpool and the University of Chester in recognition of his contribution to public health communication and drama

== Personal life ==
Stephen McGann is married to screenwriter and Call the Midwife creator Heidi Thomas. They have one son, Dominic.

McGann's great-uncle James "Jimmy" McGann was a trimmer on board the Titanic when she sank on 15 April 1912. Jimmy survived on board Collapsible Boat B and died in 1918.

== Filmography ==
Film performances
Year	Title	Role	Notes
1987	Business As Usual	Terry Flynn	
1998	Milk	Ralph	Short
1999	The Harpist	Henry Kennedy	
2006	Turning Shadows	Son	Short
2016	Game Day	Jeremy	Short

Television performances
Year	Title	Role	Notes
1983	Juliet Bravo	Simon Bailey	1 episode: "Simple Simon"
1984	Missing from Home	Butch	TV mini-series, 1 episode
1985	Brookside	David Hargreaves	2 episodes
1985 & 1989	Bergerac	Harry / Pepe Mendoza	2 episodes
1986 & 1988	Help!	Tex	8 episodes
1987	Boon	Kevin McGillivray	1 episode: "Fiddler on the Roof"
1988	Screenplay	Brendan	1 episode: "Home Front"
1989 & 1992	Streetwise	Bob Street	17 episodes
1991	Stay Lucky	Dylan Jones	1 episode: "The Food of Love"
1991	The Strauss Dynasty	Johann 'Schani' Strauss, Jnr.	TV mini-series, 8 episodes
1994	The Lifeboat	Mark Cowley	1 episode: "Three Men in a Boat"
1994	Grushko	Andrei	3 episodes
1994	Where the Buffalo Roam	Jimmy Dunn	TV movie
1995	The Hanging Gale	Daniel Phelan	TV mini-series, all 4 episodes
1995	Catherine the Great	Alexis Orlov	TV movie
1997	Melissa	Waiter (uncredited)	TV mini-Series, 1 episode
1999–2002	Emmerdale	Sean Reynolds	298 episodes
2004 & 2007	Casualty	Garry Lesser / Sam Roach	2 episodes
2006	Doctors	Bernard Stephenson	1 episode: "Sacrifice"
2007	The Bill	Simon Winstanley	1 episode: "Identity Fraud"
2012–Present	Call the Midwife	Dr. Patrick Turner	104 episodes

Documentary/Self Appearances
Year	Title	Role	Notes
1999	Melinda's Big Night In	Himself	Episode: "Not Melinda's Big Night In 3"
2000	The Richard Whiteley Show	Himself (Guest)	Episode: #3.6
2000	Live Talk	Himself	Episode: #1.4
2000–2017	Loose Women	Himself	5 episodes
2001	Open House with Gloria Hunniford	Himself	Episode: 3 August 2001
2001	Kelly	Himself	Episode: 21 September 2001
2015	Children in Need	Himself (Contestant)	On Strictly Come Dancing
2017	Call the Midwife: The Casebook	Himself (Host)	TV movie documentary
2018	Sunday Brunch	Himself (Guest)	Episode: #7.1
2018	Strictly Come Dancing	Himself (Audience member)	The Quarter-Final: Musicals Week & Results
2019	This Morning	Himself	Episode: 8 February 2019
2021	This Morning	Himself	Episode: 12 November 2021
