= Catherine of Portugal =

Catherine or Catarina of Portugal may refer to:

- Catherine of Portugal (1436–1463), middle daughter of Edward, King of Portugal; nun at the Convent of Saint Claire.
- Catarina of Portugal (1540–1614), second daughter of Duarte, Duke of Guimarães (1515–1540); Duchess of Braganza by marriage to João I, Duke of Braganza and claimant to the throne of Portugal in 1580.
- Catherine of Braganza (1638–1705), younger daughter of King John IV of Portugal; Queen consort of England, Scotland, and Ireland by marriage to King Charles II.
- Catherine of Austria (1507–1578), daughter of Joanna and Philip of Castile; Queen consort of Portugal by marriage to King John III.

== See also ==
- Princess Catherine
- Catherine of Castile
- Catherine (given name)
