= Catherine the Great (disambiguation) =

Catherine the Great (1729–1796; r. 1762–1796) was Empress of Russia.

Catherine the Great may also refer to:

== People ==
- Catherine Ndereba (born 1972), Kenyan athlete nicknamed Catherine the Great

== Arts and entertainment ==
=== Art ===
- Catherine the Great (Fabergé egg), 1914

=== Film ===
- Catherine the Great (1920 film), a German silent historical film
- Catherine the Great (1934 film), a British historical film
- Catherine the Great (1995 film), a television film

=== Music ===
- "Catherine the Great", a song by The Divine Comedy from their 2016 album Foreverland

=== Television ===
- Catherine the Great (2015 TV series)
- Catherine the Great (miniseries), a 2019 British-American television miniseries

== See also ==
- Catherine II (disambiguation)
- Catherine the Great: Portrait of a Woman, a 2011 biography by Robert K. Massie
- Ekatarina Velika (Serbian: "Catherine the Great"), a Serbian rock band
- Empress Catherine (disambiguation)
- Katharine the Great, a 1979 unauthorized biography of Katharine Graham
- The Great (TV series), a 2020 British-American television series about Catherine the Great
