= Kensington, Liverpool =

Inner city area of Liverpool, England

Coordinates: 53.410°N 2.953°W

Kensington
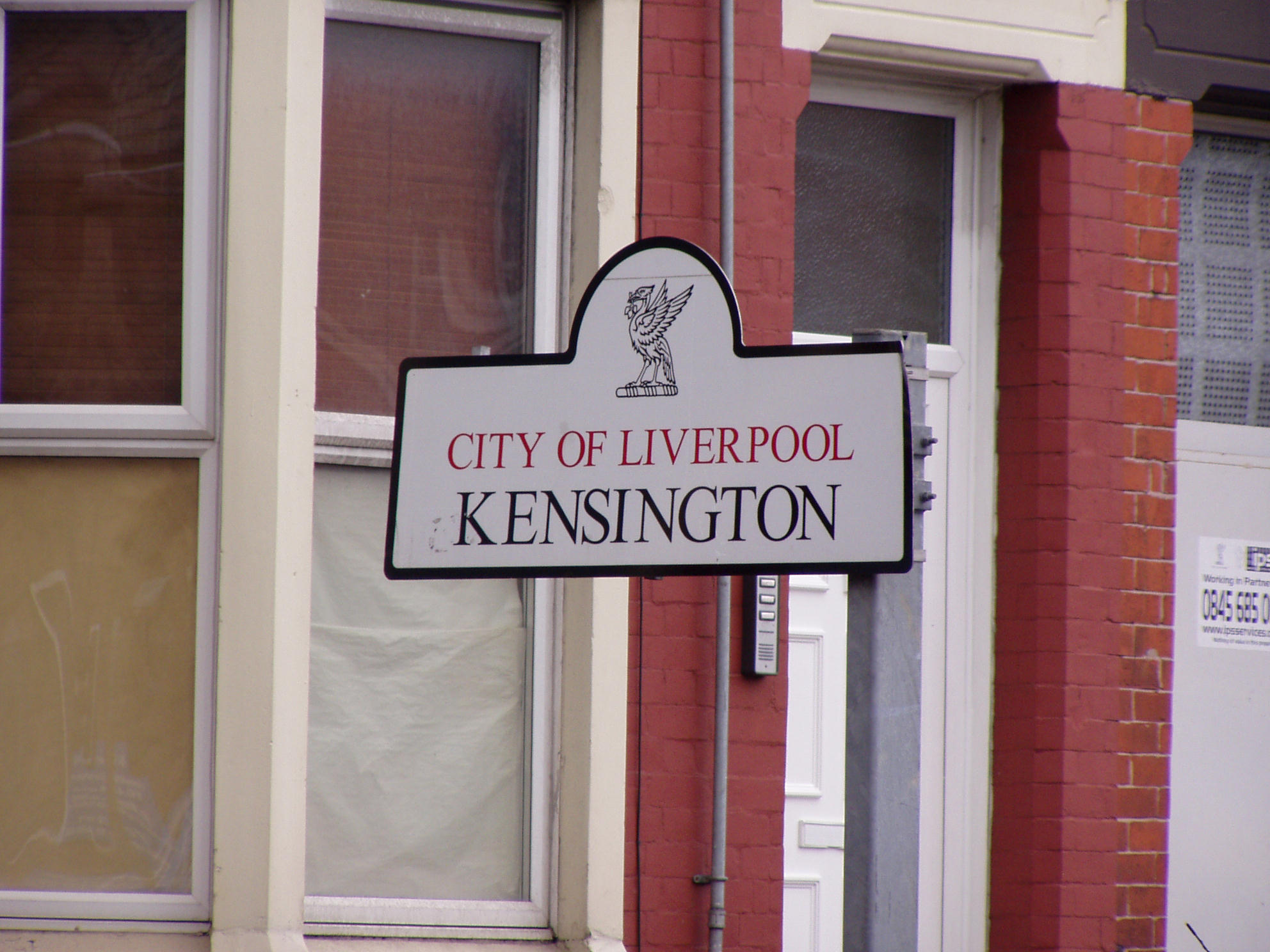

- Location within Merseyside
- OS grid reference: SJ368912
- Metropolitan borough: Liverpool
- Metropolitan county: Merseyside
- Region: North West
- Country: England
- Sovereign state: United Kingdom
- Post town: LIVERPOOL
- Postcode district: L6, L7
- Dialling code: 0151
- Police: Merseyside
- Fire: Merseyside
- Ambulance: North West
- UK Parliament: Liverpool Wavertree Liverpool Riverside

Kensington is an inner city area of Liverpool, England. It is bordered by Everton to the north, Fairfield to the east, Edge Hill to the south, and the city centre to the west. The majority of Kensington is in the Kensington and Fairfield ward, while its westernmost part Kensington Fields is in the Central ward. At the 2001 Census, Kensington had a population of 12,740.

== Description ==
The area is occupied largely by Victorian terraced houses. A number of local shops, including newsagents and convenience stores as well as some supermarkets exist along Kensington, Prescot Road and Edge Lane, the area's three main roads. Many shop fronts have been refurbished by the Government's New Deal for Communities programme. The area boasts a number of traditional Liverpool pubs. Kensington is also home to the historic Deane Road Jewish Cemetery, which was awarded £494,000 in 2010 by the Heritage Lottery Fund to aid restoration.

Due to its close proximity to the Knowledge Quarter of Liverpool, Kensington has developed into a popular student quarter, composed mainly of University of Liverpool and Liverpool John Moores University students. In 2001, 12.29% of the population of Kensington were registered students.

Kensington is home to Newsham Park, a historic Grade II-listed park, in a conservation area. Opened in 1868, it is the first park of the three sisters of Newsham, Sefton, and Stanley Park. Three of the five entrances of this park are in Kensington, those being the main entrance on Sheil Road and the other two on Prescot Road.

== Community and regeneration ==
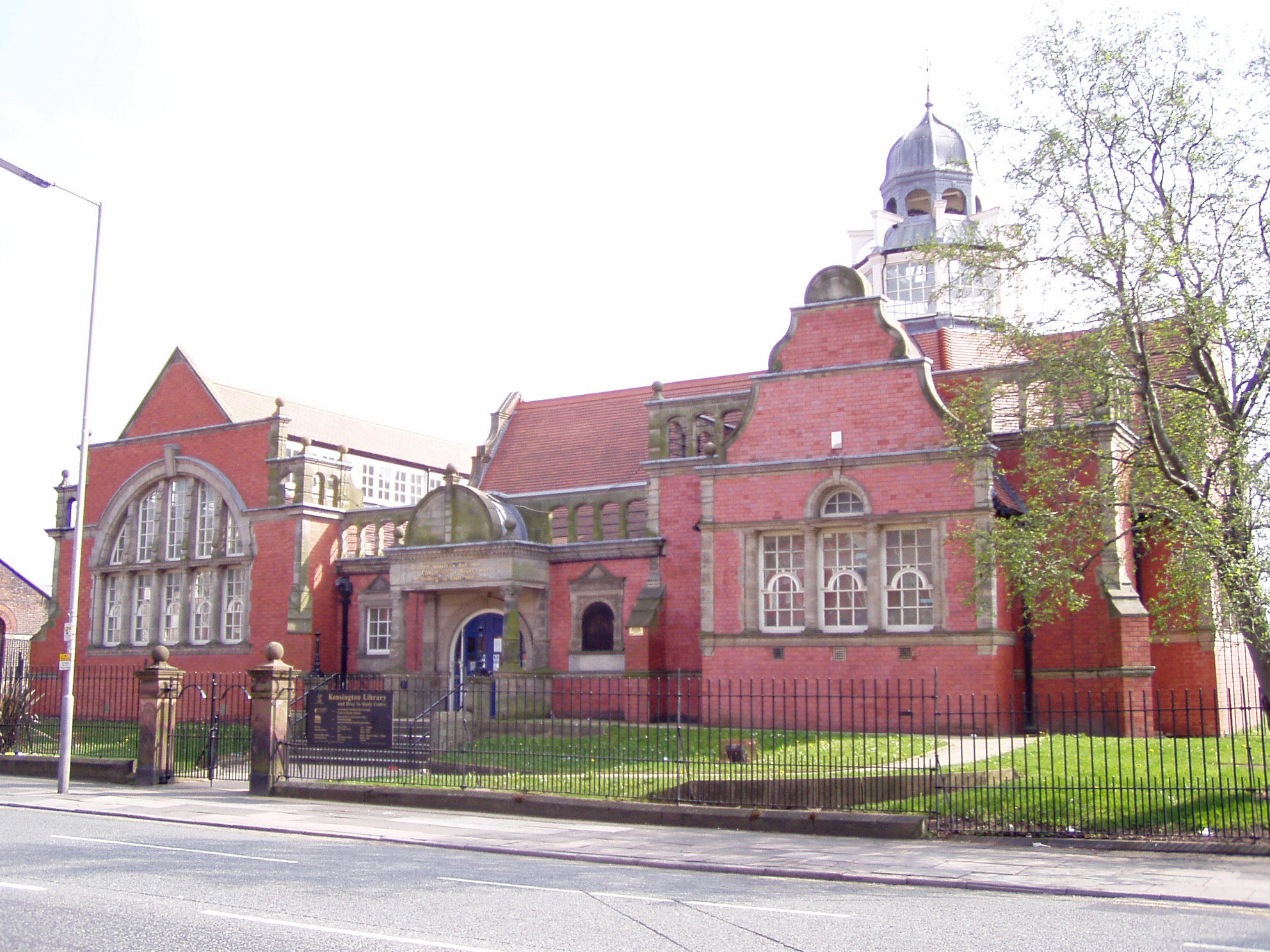
Kensington Library

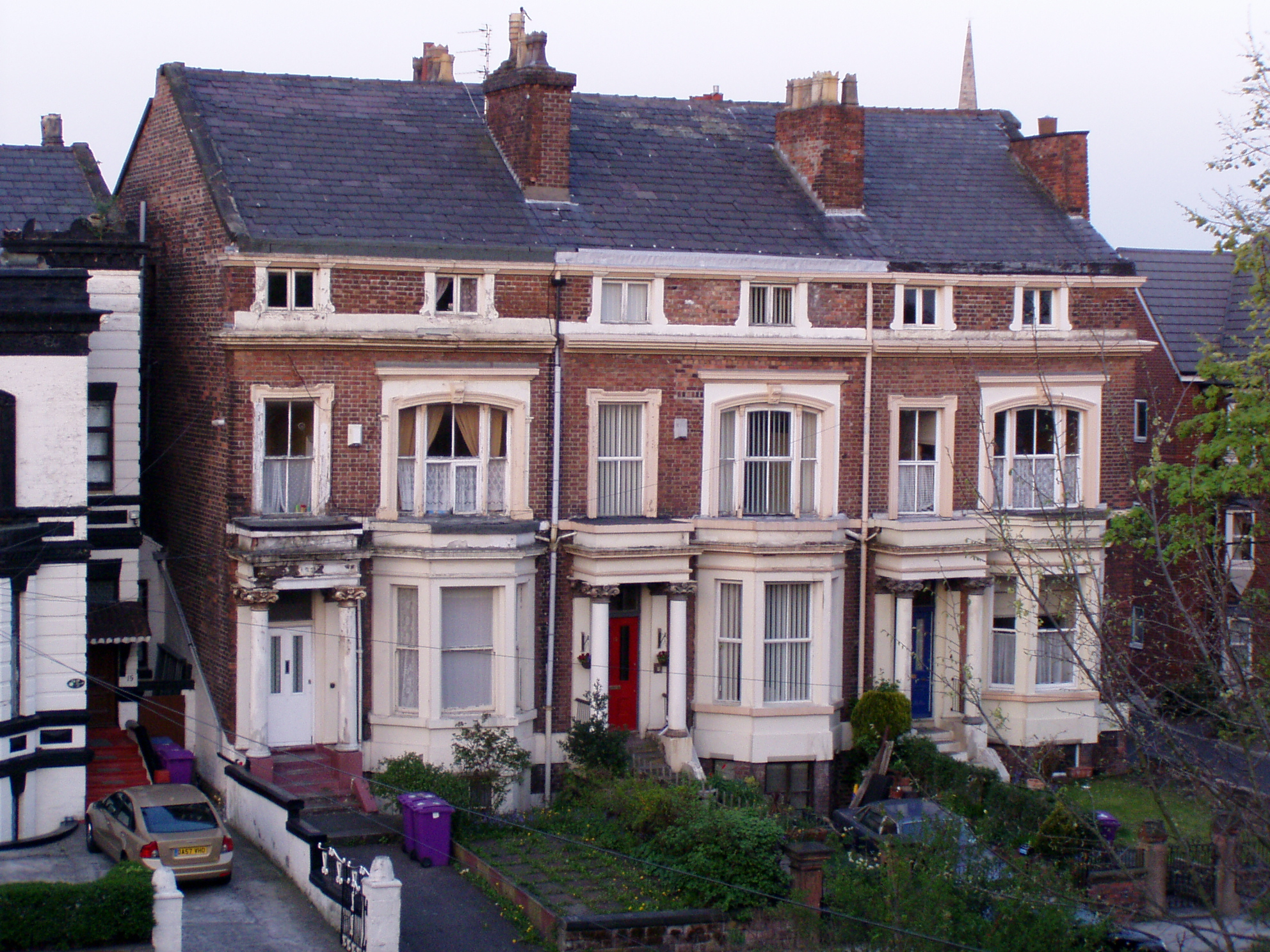
Houses on Beech Street

Since 2000, money from the Kensington Regeneration programme has allowed improvements to be made to the area, with run-down houses redeveloped and street monitors put in place to maintain social order.

Kensington Vision, a project funded by Mersey Broadband and co-ordinated by Liverpool John Moores University, ran from 2005 to 2006. It gave away 150 free broadband connections and internet-enabled Freeview set-top boxes, developing a community web hub and training the local community in web design and video editing and production skills. It also hosts an abandoned Jewish cemetery in Deene Road.

== Transport ==
There are regular buses (numbers 8, 9, 10, and variants thereof) providing services to the city centre, as well as to Huyton and St Helens.

== Cultural references ==
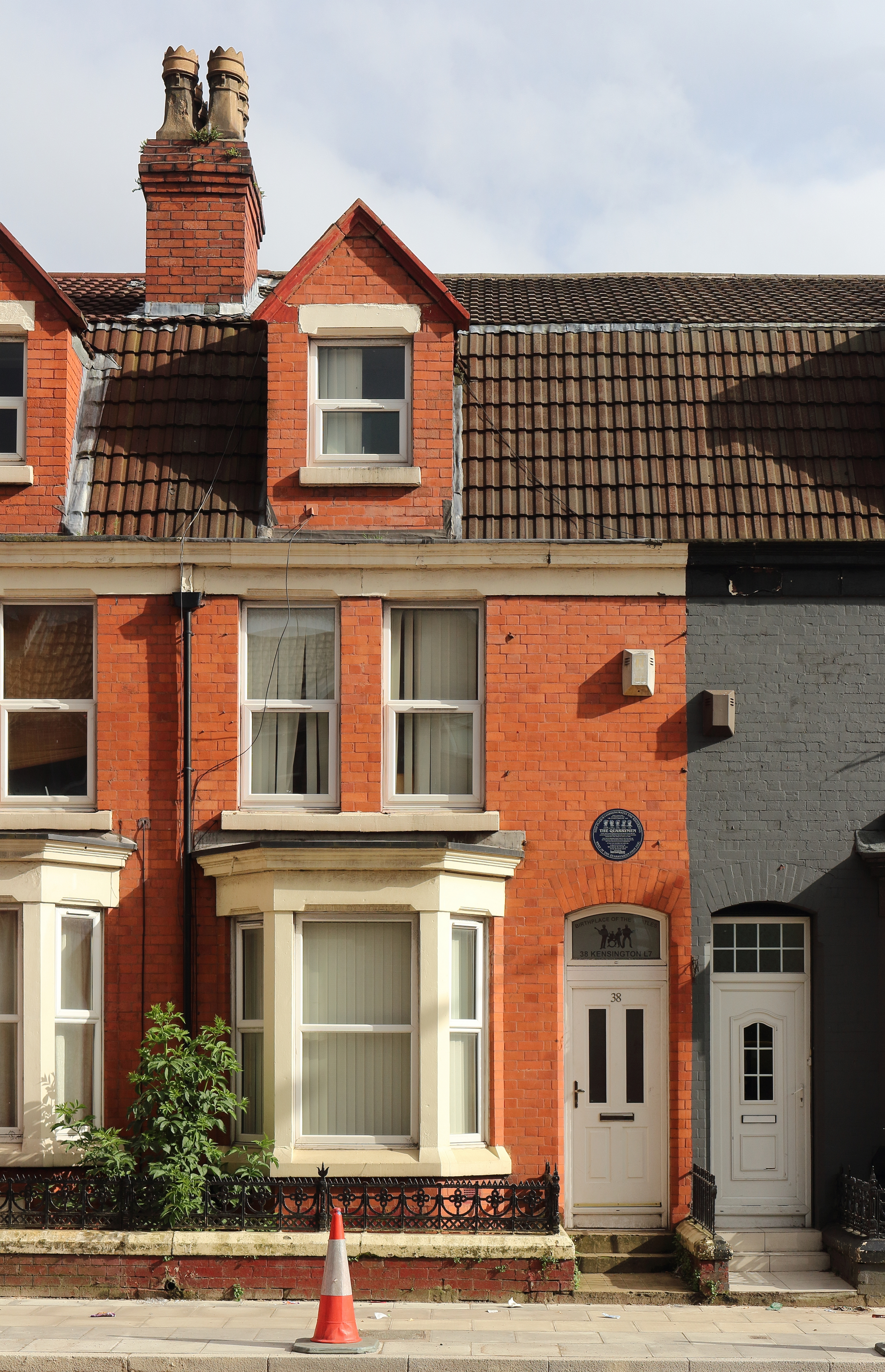
38 Kensington, Kensington, Liverpool

=== Music ===
On 14 July 1958, the Quarrymen (which later evolved into the Beatles after a few line-up changes) made their first recording at Phillips' Sound Recording Services studio located at 38 Kensington, Kensington. In the early 1980s, a series of streets in Kensington were renamed in reference to the Beatles: John Lennon Drive, Paul McCartney Way, George Harrison Close, Ringo Starr Drive, Epstein Court, Apple Court, and Cavern Court.

Kensington is also named in the Shack song "Streets of Kenny", referencing the name by which locals usually call it.

=== Television ===
As part of the Channel 4 series The Secret Millionaire (2006), millionaire John Elliott spent 10 days living under state benefits in a Kensington council flat, where he assisted a family living in a council house and paid several thousand pounds to a local asylum centre. Controversy arose when viewers pointed out that the road he lived on throughout his stay was actually a mile away in Fairfield and that shots of boarded-up houses, edited into the show to support the opinion from a local person that there was little sign of regeneration in Kensington, were actually from Edge Hill and were scheduled for demolition.

== Notable people ==
- Terence Davies, filmmaker
- Natasha Hamilton, singer
- John Head, musician
- Mick Head, musician
- Paul Mason, footballer
- Joe McGann, actor
- Mark McGann, actor, director, and musician
- Paul McGann, actor
- Stephen McGann, actor
- Ian McNabb, musician
- David Morrissey, actor and director
- Percy Phillips, recording studio owner and engineer
- Sydney Silverman, politician
- Phil Thompson, footballer
- Sonny Walker, actor
- Colin Welland, actor and director
- Eddie Youds, footballer

== See also ==
- Christ Church, Kensington
