= Catherine II (disambiguation) =

Catherine II (1729–1796; r. 1762–1796) was Empress of Russia.

Catherine II may also refer to:

- Catherine II, Latin Empress (1303–1346), titular Latin empress of Constantinople
- Catherine II of Bosnia (fl. 14th century), wife of Hermann I, Count of Celje

== See also ==
- Catherine the Great (disambiguation)
- Empress Catherine (disambiguation)
- Saint Petersburg Mining University of Empress Catherine II, Russia
