= 1996 British Academy Television Awards =

UK television awards ceremony

- Date: 21 April 1996
- Site: Theatre Royal, Drury Lane

Highlights
- Best Comedy Series: Father Ted
- Best Drama: Cracker
- Best Actor: Robbie Coltrane; Cracker
- Best Actress: Jennifer Ehle; Pride and Prejudice
- Best Comedy Performance: Martin Clunes Men Behaving Badly

The 1996 British Academy Television Awards were held on 21 April 1996 at London's Theatre Royal, Drury Lane followed by dinner in The Great Room, Grosvenor House Hotel, as a joint ceremony with the British Academy Film Awards.

== Winners and nominees ==
Winners are listed first and highlighted in boldface; the nominees are listed below.

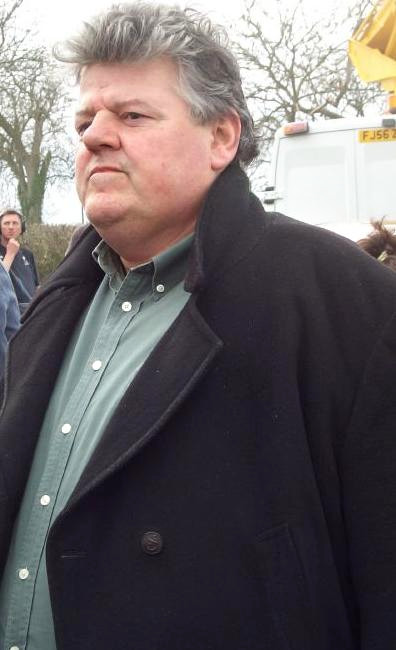
Best Actor award winner Robbie Coltrane. This was his third consecutive victory in this category after winning in 1994 and 1995.

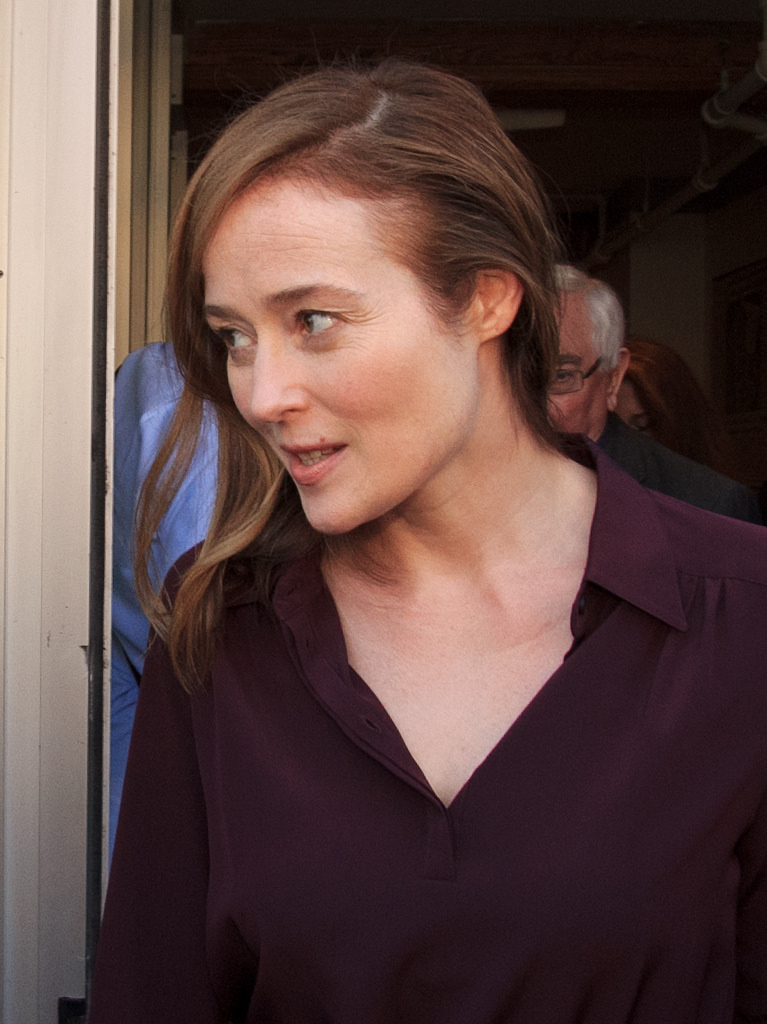
Best Actress winner Jennifer Ehle.

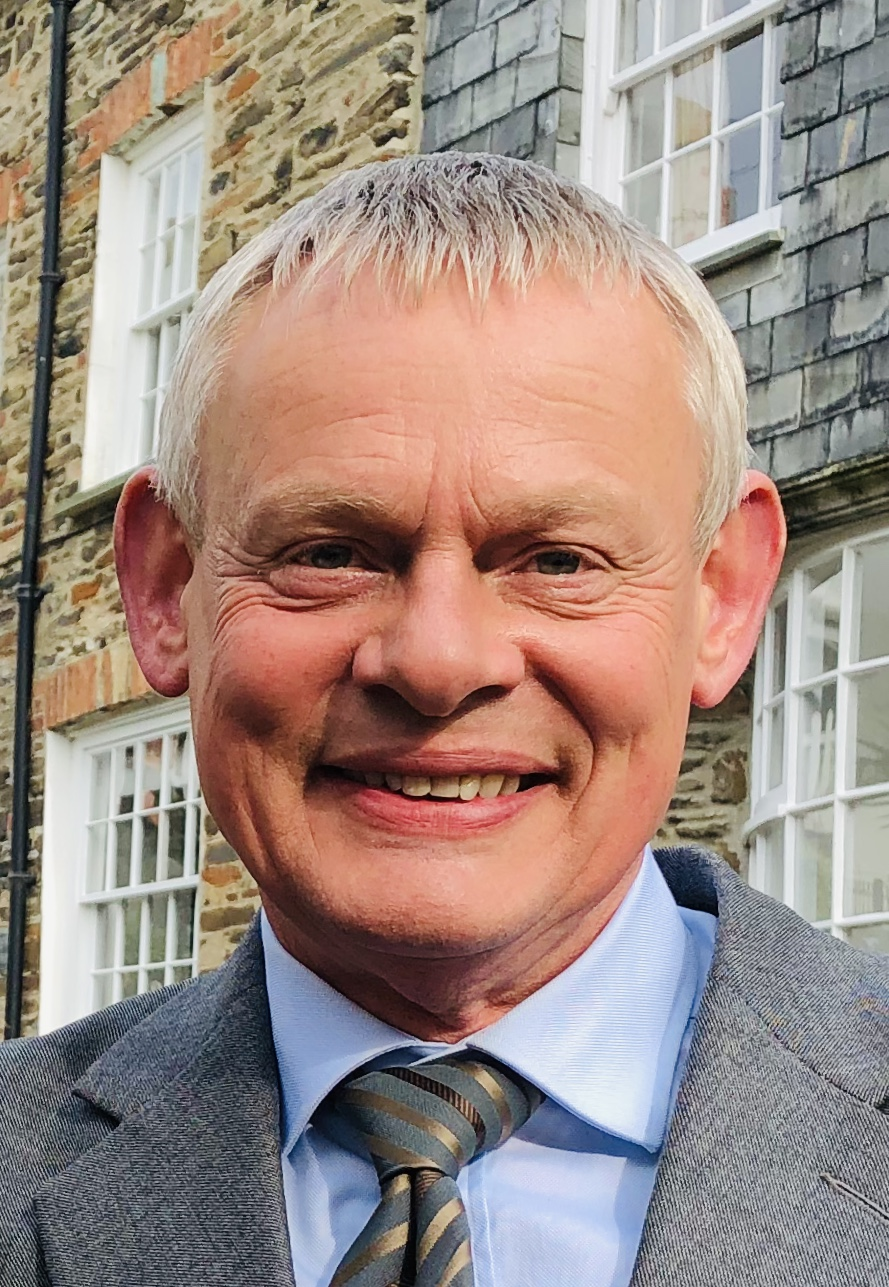
Best Comedy Performance winner Martin Clunes.

Best Drama Series	Best Drama Serial
**Cracker (ITV)**; All Quiet on the Preston Front (BBC); A Touch of Frost (ITV Productions / ITV); Prime Suspect 4: The Lost Child (ITV)	**The Politician's Wife (Channel 4)**; Pride and Prejudice (BBC1); Band of Gold (ITV); The Hanging Gale (BBC1)
Best Actor	Best Actress
**Robbie Coltrane** – **Cracker (ITV)**; Robert Lindsay – Jake's Progress (Channel 4); Ian Richardson – The Final Cut (BBC); Colin Firth – Pride and Prejudice (BBC1); Benjamin Whitrow – Pride and Prejudice (BBC1)	**Jennifer Ehle** – **Pride and Prejudice (BBC1)**; Juliet Stevenson – The Politician's Wife (Channel 4); Helen Mirren – Prime Suspect 4: The Lost Child (ITV); Geraldine James – Band of Gold (ITV)
Best Comedy (Programme or Series)	Best Comedy Performance
**Father Ted (Hat Trick Productions / Channel 4)**; Absolutely Fabulous (BBC / BBC1); Men Behaving Badly (Hartswood Films / BBC1); One Foot in the Grave (BBC / BBC1)	**Martin Clunes** – **Men Behaving Badly (BBC1)**; Joanna Lumley – Absolutely Fabulous (BBC1); Judi Dench – As Time Goes By; Richard Wilson – One Foot in the Grave
Best Single Drama	Best Factual Series
**Persuasion (BBC / WGBH / BBC Films)**; Eleven Men Against Eleven (Hat Trick Productions / Channel 4); Go Now (BBC); Heroes and Villains: The Last Englishman (Tiger Aspect Productions / BBC)	**The Death of Yugoslavia** – **Norma Percy**; Dispatches – David Lloyd; Network First – Stuart Prebble, John Blake; The Private Life of Plants – Mike Salisbury
Best Light Entertainment Performance	Best Light Entertainment Programme or Series
**Rory Bremner** – **Rory Bremner - Who Else?**; Paul Merton – Have I Got News for You; Caroline Aherne – The Mrs Merton Show; Peter Ustinov – An Evening with Sir Peter Ustinov	**The Mrs Merton Show (Granada Television / BBC1)**; Have I Got News for You (Hat Trick Productions / BBC2); Rory Bremner - Who Else? (Kudos Film & Television / Channel 4); Shooting Stars (BBC2)
Best News Coverage	Best Talk Show
**Channel 4 News Coverage Of War Crimes In Former Yugoslavia** – **Production Team**; BBC1 News Coverage On Bosnia – Martin Bell; BBC2 Newsnight – Peter Horrocks; ITN Coverage Of The War In Chechnya – Production Team	**Martin Bashir and Mike Robinson** – **Panorama: "An Interview with HRH The Princess of Wales" (BBC / BBC1)** * The award was returned in May 2021.; Anne Marie Thorogood and Dan Patterson – Clive Anderson Talks Back (Hat Trick Productions / Channel 4); Patsy Newey, Esther Rantzen, and Jane Elsdon-Dew – Esther (BBC / BBC2); Jeff Anderson – This Morning (Granada Television / ITV)
Flaherty Award for Single Documentary	Huw Wheldon Award for Arts Programme or Series
**The Betrayed - Russian Invasion of Chechnya (October Films / Channel 4)**; Anne Frank Remembered (Anne Frank House / Walt Disney Pictures / BBC); The Dying Rooms (Lauderdale Productions / Channel 4)	**Children of the Revolution – John Wyver, David Hinton**; Arena – Peter Lydon; The Homecoming – Archie Baron; A Personal Journey With Martin Scorsese Through American Movies – Florence Dauman
Best Sports / Events Coverage in Real Time	Foreign Programme Award
**Peter Hylton Cleaver, Neil Eccles and Philip S. Gilbert and Team – VE Day Coverage (BBC)**; Jane Garrod – Cheltenham Gold Cup; Andy Melvin, Tony Mills – Super Sunday - The Final Day Of The Premiership; Neil Eccles, Simon Betts, Philip S Gilbert – VJ-50 Live: The Final Tribute	**ER**
Best Children's Programme - Factual	Best Children's Programme - Fiction or Entertainment
**Short Change** – **Roy Milani**; Art Attack – Tim Edmunds, Neil Buchanan; How 2 – Adrian Edwards, Jeremy Cross; Wise Up – Mick Robertson, Julian Kemp	**Coping with Christmas** – **Sue Nott, Dan Zeff, Peter Corey**; Byker Grove – Matthew Robinson, Tim Leandro, Brian B Thompson; Jackanory – Maggie Barbour; The Ward – Kieran Roberts, Beryl Richards
The Lew Grade Award	The Dennis Potter Award
**Antiques Roadshow**	**Roy Clarke**
The Alan Clarke Award	The Richard Dimbleby Award
**Roy Battersby**	**Jeremy Paxman**
Lloyds Bank People's Vote For The Most Popular Television Programme	Originality
**The X Files**	**Aardman Animation** – **Nick Park**

=== Craft Awards ===
Best Costume Design	Best Original Television Music
**Persuasion** – **Alexandra Byrne**; The Hanging Gale – Howard Burden; Pride and Prejudice – Dinah Collin; Performance: Henry IV – Joan Wadge	**Persuasion** – 'Jeremy Sams; Signs and Wonders – Daemion Barry; The Hanging Gale – Shaun Davey; Cracker – Rick Wentworth
Best Design	Best Make-Up
**Persuasion** – **William Dudley, Brian Sykes**; The Buccaneers – Tony Burrough; The Hanging Gale – Tim Hutchinson; Cold Comfort Farm – Malcolm Thornton	**Cold Comfort Farm** – **Dorka Nieradzik**; Pride and Prejudice – Caroline Noble; Persuasion – Jean Speak; Cotham: The Buccaneers – Christine Walmesley
Best Photography - Factual	Best Photography and Lighting - Fiction
**True Stories: The Betrayed** – **Jacek Petrycki**; Wildlife: Great White Shark - The True Story Of Jaws (Special) – Paul Atkins, Peter, Scoones, Doug Allen; Secret Asia: The Dying Rooms – Peter Hugh, Brian Woods; The Homecoming – Jacek Petrycki	**Persuasion** – **John Daly**; The Politician's Wife – Tom McDougal; McCallum – Brian Morgan; Prime Suspect – David Odd
Best Editing - Factual	Best Editing - Fiction/Entertainment
**True Stories: The Betrayed** – **Graham Shrimpton**; The Private Life of Plants – Tim Coope, Jo Payne, Martin Elsbury; The Beatles Anthology – Andy Matthews; HMS Brilliant – Andy Willsmore, Tony Heavan	**Love Bites: Go Now** – **Trevor Waite**; The Politician's Wife – Alan Jones; Cracker – Edward Mansell; The Buccaneers – Greg Miller
Best Sound - Factual	Best Sound - Fiction/Entertainment
**The Beatles Anthology** – **Howie Nicol, Richard King, Andy Matthews, Danny Longhurst**; HMS Brilliant – Adrian Bell, Tony Anscombe, Trish Stephenson, Gary McIntyre; True Stories: The Betrayed – Patrick Bolland, Michael Narduzzo; The Private Life of Plants – Trevor Gosling, Lucy Rutherford, Martin Harries, Peter Hicks	**Love Bites: Loved Up** – **John Taylor, Craig Irving, Tim Hudnott, Pete Collins, Chris Graver**; Four Goes To Glyndebourne: Ermione – John Middleton, Andy Rose; The Choir – Derek Norman, Chris Graver, Keith Marriner; Prime Suspect – Nick Steer, John Rutherford, John Senior, John Whitworth
Best Graphic Design
**BBC2 Christmas Animations** – **Iain Greenway, Jane Wyatt**; BBC1 Winter Animations – Mark Chaudoir, Paula Williams; Have I Got News For You – Tim Searle; American Football: Blitz – Susan Young Limited

=== Special awards ===
- **Camera Team – Survival**
- **BBC**
