= Joe McGann =

English actor (born 1958)

- Born: Joseph McGann; 24 July 1958 (age 68); Kensington, Liverpool, England
- Occupation: Actor
- Years active: 1982–present
- Children: 1
- Family: Paul McGann (brother); Mark McGann (brother); Stephen McGann (brother); Heidi Thomas (sister-in-law); Joseph McGann (nephew)

Joseph McGann (born 24 July 1958) is an English actor. His roles include the lead role of Charlie Burrows, the housekeeper in the TV comedy series The Upper Hand (1990–1996), Night and Day, and his voice role as Sir Gideon Ofnir in the video game Elden Ring (2022).

== Life and career ==
McGann was born in Kensington, Liverpool to a metallurgist father, Joe, and a teacher mother, Clare. His three younger brothers – Paul, Mark and Stephen – are also actors. He also has a younger sister named Clare after their mother. Together with Stephen and Mark, he starred in Tom, Dick and Harry, a play by Ray and Michael Cooney at the Duke of York's Theatre, in 2005. In 1995, all four brothers starred in the BBC drama The Hanging Gale. His great-uncle James "Jimmy" McGann was a trimmer on board the Titanic and survived on Collapsible Boat B.

In 1982, McGann successfully auditioned for the role of Barry Grant in the British soap opera Brookside, after he was cast by show creator Phil Redmond. McGann was refused an Equity card and producers had to recast the role with Paul Usher. In 1989, he portrayed Lord Glozelle in the BBC version of Prince Caspian. The following year, he started playing the role of Charlie Burrows in the long-running ITV sitcom The Upper Hand, alongside Diana Weston and Honor Blackman. During this period, he also appeared in All Creatures Great and Small and Dangerfield (TV series).

In 1992, he voiced "Masklin" in the TV adaptation of Truckers, the first of Terry Pratchett's three books in The Nome Trilogy. He featured as Grimes at the Chichester Festival Theatre in the 2003 stage musical adaptation (by Jason Carr and Gary Yershon) of the novel The Water Babies.

On 16 December 2007, he played one of the three Magi in BBC Three's Nativity; a live performance of the Bible story of Jesus's birth, set in modern-day Liverpool. His main solo song was "Lady Madonna", singing to the newly-born Jesus who is lying in a shopping trolley in a pub garage.

McGann appeared on tour with Fiddler on the Roof playing the paterfamilias, Tevye, in 2008 but left the show 2 months before the tour ended due to an arm injury sustained on stage. In 2009, he appeared on BBC's Celebrity MasterChef alongside Linda Barker and Ninia Benjamin and dropped out in the semi-finals. In May-June 2009, he appeared as Richard in "Lost Monsters" by Laurence Wilson at Liverpool's Everyman Theatre. As of 2011, he can be seen occasionally guest presenting STV's daily magazine show, The Hour, alongside regular host Michelle McManus.

In 2012, he was cast as Ray Say in a UK touring production of The Rise and Fall of Little Voice. However he dropped out of the tour midway through with understudy Phil Andrews taking over his role for the remainder of the tour. In October 2015, he joined the cast of Elf: The Musical, playing the role of Walter Hobbs at the Dominion Theatre.

It was announced in 2019 that McGann had joined the cast of Hollyoaks as Edward Hutchinson, the father of established character Tony Hutchinson (Nick Pickard). In December 2020, it was announced that McGann had filmed his final scenes on the soap, which aired later that month.

== Acting credits ==
=== Film ===
Year	Title	Role
1985	No Surrender	2nd Policeman
1997	Food of Love	Sam
1998	The Brylcreem Boys	Captain Deegan

=== Television ===
Year	Title	Role	Notes
1987-1988	Rockliffe's Babies	PC Gerry O'Dowd	Recurring role
1989-2024	Casualty	Various Roles	9 episodes
1989	Norbert Smith: A Life	Brian Beale/Ken	TV film
1989	Prince Caspian	Lord Glozelle	TV film
1990-1996	The Upper Hand	Charlie Burrows	Main role
1990	All Creatures Great and Small	Nat Briggs	Episode: Knowin' How to Do It
1990-1992	Harry Enfield's Television Programme	Barry Scouser	7 episodes
1992	Truckers	Masklin (voice)	Miniseries
1995	The Hanging Gale	Sean Phelan	Miniseries
2000	Madame Bovary	Charles Bovary	TV film
2001–2003	Night & Day	Alex Wells	Recurring role
2005–2015	Doctors	Daz/Jake McIntyre	2 episodes
2007	Liverpool Nativity	Magi	TV film
2010	I Shouldn't Be Alive	Theo Rosmulder	Episode: Lost in the Outback
2011	My Family	Detective Cole	Episode: Booked
2016	Midsomer Murders	Jez Oliver	Episode: Breaking the Chain
2019–2020	Hollyoaks	Edward Hutchinson	Recurring role
2022	Vera	Julian Carr	1 episode
2024	Kaos	Polyphemus	3 episodes

=== Video games ===
Year	Production	Voice role
2022	Elden Ring	Sir Gideon Ofnir
