= Queen Catherine =

Queen Catherine may refer to:

== People ==
- Catherine of England (disambiguation), various queen consorts
- Queen Catherine of Sweden (disambiguation), various queen consorts
- Catherine of Lancaster (1373–1418), queen consort of Henry III, King of Castile
- Catherine of Bosnia (1424/1425 – 1478), queen consort of Thomas, King of Bosnia
- Catherine of Poděbrady (1449–1464), queen consort of Matthias I, King of Hungary
- Catherine Cornaro (1454–1510; r. 1474–1489), Queen of Cyprus
- Catherine of Navarre (1468–1517; r. 1483–1517), Queen of Navarre
- Catherine of Austria (1507–1578), queen consort of John III, King of Portugal
- Catherine de' Medici (1519–1589), queen consort of Henry II, King of France
- Catherine of Austria (1533–1572), third queen consort of Sigismund II, King of Poland
- Catherine Opalińska (1680–1747), queen consort of Stanislaus I, King of Poland
- Catherine Pavlovna of Russia (1788–1819), first queen consort of William I, King of Württemberg

== See also ==
- Anne Catherine of Brandenburg (1575–1612), queen consort of Christian IV, King of Denmark
- Catharine Montour (d. after 1791), Iroquois ruler also called Queen Catharine
- Catherine Ironfist, a fictional queen in Heroes of Might and Magic III
- Empress Catherine (disambiguation)
- Ketevan the Martyr (c. 1560 – 1624), queen consort of David I, King of Kakheti
- Princess Catherine (disambiguation)
  - Catherine, Princess of Wales (born 1982), wife of William, Prince of Wales (heir of United Kingdom)
