= Catherine of Sweden =

Catherine of Sweden, Catharina of Sweden, Karin of Sweden or Katarina of Sweden may refer to:

== People ==
=== Princesses ===
- Katarina Ingesdotter (fl. 1110), youngest child of Inge the Elder, King of Sweden
- Katarina Eriksdotter (fl. 12th century), eldest daughter of Eric IX, King of Sweden
- Karin (b. 1170s or 1180s), alleged daughter of Canute I, King of Sweden
- Catherine of Anhalt (fl. 1245–1289), Swedish noble and princess consort of Siegfried I, Prince of Anhalt-Zerbst
- Katarina (d. 1283), fourth daughter of Valdemar, King of Sweden
- Katarina (d. after 1320), youngest child of Birger, King of Sweden
- Catherine Vasa of Sweden (1539–1610), eldest daughter of Gustav I, King of Sweden, and Countess of East Frisia by marriage to Count Edzard II
- Catherine of Sweden, Countess Palatine of Kleeburg (1584–1638), third daughter of Charles IX, King of Sweden, and consort of John Casimir, Count Palatine of Kleeburg
- Catherine (1594–1594), second daughter of Sigismund, King of Sweden
- Catherine (1596–1597), third daughter of Sigismund, King of Sweden

=== Queens ===
- Katarina Sunesdotter (1215–1252), queen consort of Erik XI, King of Sweden
- Catherine Karlsdotter (d. 1450), first queen consort of Charles VIII, King of Sweden
- Catherine of Saxe-Lauenburg (1513–1535), first queen consort of Gustav I, King of Sweden
- Catherine Jagiellon (1526–1583), first queen consort of John III, King of Sweden
- Catherine Stenbock (1535–1621), third queen consort of Gustav I, King of Sweden
- Karin Månsdotter (1550–1612), queen consort of Erik XIV, King of Sweden

=== Saints ===
- Catherine of Vadstena (1331 or 1332 – 1381), Catholic saint

== See also ==
- Catherine of Pomerania, Countess Palatine of Neumarkt (c. 1390 – 1426), adopted by Margaret I, Queen of Sweden
- Princess Catherine (disambiguation)
- Queen Catherine (disambiguation)
- Richardis Catherine of Mecklenburg (1370 or 1372 – 1400), only daughter of Albert, King of Sweden
- St. Catherine (disambiguation)
