= Catherine the Great (1995 film) =

- DVD cover, featuring Catherine Zeta-Jones
- Genre: Biography; Drama; History
- Written by: John Goldsmith; Frank Tudisco
- Directed by: Marvin J. Chomsky; John Goldsmith
- Starring: Catherine Zeta-Jones
- Music by: Laurence Rosenthal
- Country of origin: Germany; United States; Austria
- Original language: English

Production
- Executive producers: Konstantin Thoeren; Fred Sidewater; Wolf Bauer
- Producer: Marvin J. Chomsky
- Cinematography: Elemér Ragályi
- Editor: Petra von Oelffen
- Running time: 100 minutes

Original release
- Release: 1995

Catherine the Great is a 1995 television movie based on the life of Catherine II of Russia. It stars Catherine Zeta-Jones as Catherine, Jeanne Moreau as Empress Elizabeth and Omar Sharif as Alexis Razumovsky.

== Plot ==
A young German Princess (Catherine Zeta-Jones) marries the immature future Tsar Peter III (Hannes Jaenicke). She gradually becomes a skillful politician and rises to become Catherine the Great after she overthrows her husband to embrace her Russian future.

== Cast ==
- Catherine Zeta-Jones as Catherine
- Paul McGann as Potemkin
- Ian Richardson as Vorontzov
- Brian Blessed as Bestuzhev
- John Rhys-Davies as Pugachev
- Craig McLachlan as Saltykov
- Hannes Jaenicke as Peter
- Agnès Soral as Countess Bruce
- Mark McGann as Orlov
- Karl Johnson as Sheshkovsky
- Stephen McGann as Alexis Orlov
- Veronica Ferres as Vorontsova
- Mel Ferrer as Patriarch
- Jeanne Moreau as Empress Elizabeth Petrovna
- Omar Sharif as Razumovsky
- Tim McInnerny as Mad Monk
- Horst Frank as Schwerin
- Vernon Dobtcheff as Naryshkin
- Christoph Waltz as Mirovich

== Home media ==
The film was released on Region 1 DVD on February 27, 2001 by A&E Home Video.
