= The Hanging Gale =

1995 British–Irish miniseries

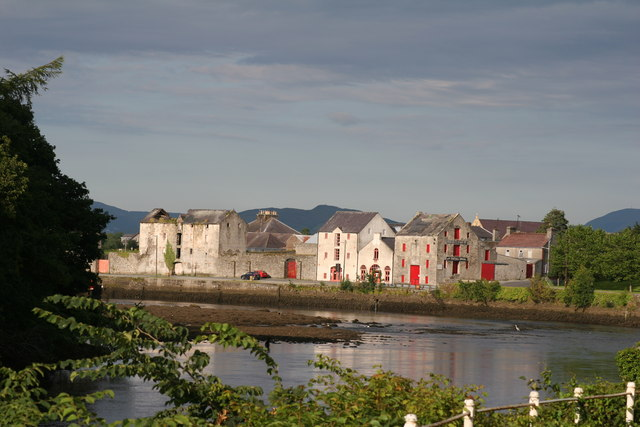
- The Old Warehouses in Ramelton, the main location for The Hanging Gale
- Genre: Historical drama
- Written by: Allan Cubitt
- Directed by: Diarmuid Lawrence
- Starring: Joe McGann; Paul McGann; Mark McGann; Stephen McGann; Michael Kitchen
- Composer: Shaun Davey
- Country of origin: United Kingdom–Ireland
- Original language: English
- No. of episodes: 4

Production
- Producer: Jonathan Cavendish
- Production locations: Ramelton, County Donegal, Ulster
- Cinematography: Rex Maidment
- Editor: Don Fairservice
- Running time: 4 × 52 minutes
- Production companies: Little Bird Films; BBC Northern Ireland; Raidió Teilifís Éireann

Original release
- Network: RTÉ One
- Release: 2 May – 23 May 1995

The Hanging Gale is a four-episode television serial which first aired on RTÉ One (Republic of Ireland) and BBC1 (United Kingdom) in 1995. The series was a British–Irish co-production, made by Little Bird Films for BBC Northern Ireland in association with Raidió Teilifís Éireann (RTÉ), with support from the Irish Film Board.

The serial, set in 1846 in County Donegal in the west of Ulster at the beginning of Ireland's Great Famine, starred the four McGann brothers: Joe McGann, Paul McGann, Mark McGann and Stephen McGann, and was based on an original idea by Joe and Stephen McGann while researching their family's history.

The title of the series comes from the term 'hanging gale', the name for a widespread practice in Ireland at the time, where a landlord would allow new tenants a six-month grace period on payment of their rent, with the expectation that the rent owed would be paid when the land's crops were harvested and sold.

== Plot ==
Under pressure to pay rental arrears, members of a secret society convict land agent Henry Jenkins in a "hedgerow trial" and brutally execute him, also murdering his coach driver. The replacement agent, Captain William Townsend (Michael Kitchen), soon arrives and begins reviewing papers and investigating the state of affairs of both the land and tenants. Within minutes he is attacked by a mob who demand an audience. After agreeing to see a group of three only on the following day, he narrowly avoids being lynched when the conversation doesn't go the way the tenants would like. He is rescued by British soldiers.

The Phelans are a family of Irish tenant farmers: Sean (Joe McGann) and his wife Maeve (Fiona Victory); Conor (Mark McGann); Liam (Paul McGann) and Daniel (Stephen McGann), a schoolteacher who is also a member of the secret society. Further conflicts arise in attempts to collect their rent and fight against the Agent (Mr. Townsend) who continues to try to be as fair as he might under the circumstances. He defers the payment of the rent until after the harvest. He orders that a Catholic priest be brought to the parish since there is none; Father Liam Phelan (Paul McGann) arrives. Father Liam attempts to make peace and opposes Daniel's violent "solution". Daniel fails in an attempt to assassinate Townsend, only seriously wounding him in the leg. Townsend arrives home battered and gulps down brandy to numb the pain. He asks Mary Dolan (Tina Kellegher) his maid who was hired on after being turned out of their land by Townsend himself when her family could not pay rent, to help him off with his boots. The brandy and his proximity to her in her night shirt encourage him to make a pass at her, but he does not assault her. He begs her pardon the next day.

Mary sneaks away and sees Daniel, whom she still loves, despite his violent ways. After a night together with him, Daniel accuses her of losing her virginity to her English employer, which wounds her deeply and she belatedly realizes her allegiance to Daniel is misplaced. In response to the attempt on his life by Daniel Phelan, Townsend unlawfully evicts all of the Phelans despite the fact their rent is paid in full. The Phelans fruitlessly resist the eviction. Sean and Conor are captured and sentenced to six months in prison. Conor manages to escape on the way to the jail. Sean dies in prison.

Mary, Townsend's servant, has discovered she is pregnant by Daniel and tries to eat a kind of wild berry to cause an abortion. The berries make her ill and she is nursed back to health by Townsend and his doctor who recognizes her signs of pregnancy. Townsend tells her that she can stay at his home and have her baby. Conor, still on the lam from British soldiers after his escape finds Sean's wife and children, and joins them as they emigrate to America on an assisted passage scheme, which Townsend creates false documents to facilitate. Daniel arrives the next day determined to kill Townsend. With Mary throwing herself in front of her master, Daniel still manages to shoot and kill him. He is then captured and executed.

== Cast ==
- Joe McGann – Sean Phelan
- Mark McGann – Conor Phelan
- Paul McGann – Liam Phelan
- Stephen McGann – Daniel Phelan
- Michael Kitchen – Captain William Townsend
- Fiona Victory – Maeve Phelan
- Tina Kellegher – Mary Dolan
- Seán McGinley – Ferry
- Gerard McSorley – Coulter
- Joe Pilkington – James Phelan
- Ciarán Fitzgerald – Joseph Phelan
- Ciara Marley – Molly Phelan
- Dylan O'Connell – Baby Hannah
- Barry Barnes – Michael Dolan
- Birdy Sweeney – Patrick Dolan
- Maire Ni Ghrainne – Sarah Dolan
- Mal Whyte – McBride
- Dave Duffy – McCafferty
- Peter Caffrey – Dr. Davis
- Joe Savino – Meagher
- BJ Hogg – Harkin
- Gerry Walsh – Brady
- Oliver Maguire – Mr. Denny
- Eileen Colgan – Mrs. Denny
- Alan Stanford – Henry Jenkins
- Liam Carney – Shanahan
- Seamus Moran – Constable Coyle
- Albie Woodington – Sergeant Major
- George Shane – Brewster
- Frank O'Sullivan – Kerryman
- Ian Beattie – Brian Sweeney
- Stephen Kennedy – Martin

== Broadcast details ==
The Hanging Gale first aired in the Republic of Ireland on RTÉ One, at 9.30pm on Tuesday nights, from 2 to 23 May 1995. The series aired in the United Kingdom on BBC1 on Sunday nights at 9.00pm from 14 May to 4 June 1995.

== Awards ==
Composer Shaun Davey won an Ivor Novello Award for his soundtrack to the series.

The series was nominated for four 1996 BAFTA TV awards in the Best Drama Serial, Best Television Music, Best Design and Best Costume Design categories.
