= Fiona Victory =

Irish actress (born 1952)

- Born: 1952 (age 72–73); Dublin, Ireland
- Occupation: Actress
- Years active: 1972–2001
- Spouse: Kenneth Cranham
- Children: 1
- Parent: Gerard Victory (father)

Fiona Victory (born 1952) is an Irish actress. Her television roles include Louise Daly in Bracken (1980), Harriet Wright in Shine on Harvey Moon (1982), Maeve Phelan in The Hanging Gale (1995) and Dr Annie Robbins in Dangerfield (1997). She has also appeared in the films Return to Oz (1985) and Swept from the Sea (1997).

In 1990, Victory won the Best Actress award at the Dublin Theatre Festival, for her portrayal of Kitty O'Shea in the play of the same name at the Peacock Theatre.

== Personal life ==
Fiona Victory is the daughter of the Irish composer Gerard Victory, who was Head of Music for Raidió Teilifís Éireann.

She is married to the Scottish actor Kenneth Cranham and they have one daughter, Kathleen.

== Filmography ==
=== Film ===
Year	Title	Role	Notes
1972	Commuter Husbands	Meditating girl	
1974	On the Game	Giulia Barucci	
1984	Champions	Helen	
1985	Return to Oz	Mombi III	
1997	Swept from the Sea	Mrs. Smith	

=== Television ===
Year	Title	Role	Notes
1972	Tales From the Lazy Acre	Girl in church / Miss Delahunty	Episodes: "Stone Cold Sober" "The Bitter Pill"
1980–1981	Bracken	Louise Daly	8 episodes
1981	Bergerac	Doctor Leon	Episode: "Relative Values
1981–1982	Nanny	Mrs. Persse / Fin Perse	Episodes: "Now Look What You've Done" (1981) "A Twist of Fate" (1982)
1982	Shine on Harvey Moon	Harriet Wright	9 episodes
1983	Jemima Shore Investigates	Chloe	Episodes: "A Splash of Red" Parts 1 & 2
1985	Murder of a Moderate Man	Annie	Mini series, 5 episodes
1985	Coming Through	Alice Dax	TV movie
1988	Final Run	Kate	4 episodes
1988	Rockliffe's Folly	Harriet Dawson	Episode: "Lie of the Land"
1988	A Dinner of Herbs	Jane	TV movie
1989	Iranian Nights	Scheherezade	TV movie
1989	Rules of Engagement	Sandra Gillespie	Mini-series, 6 episodes
1990	Screen Two	Penny	Episode: "Drowning in the Shallow End"
1991	Dear Rosie	Rosie	Short
1992	Resnick: Lonely Hearts	Rachel Chaplin	TV movie
1992	Casualty	Katherine McArthy	Episode: "Tender Loving Care"
1995	The Hanging Gale	Maeve Phelan	4 episode mini-series
1996	Poldark	Caroline Enys	TV movie
1996–1997	Dangerfield	Dr. Annie Robbins	18 episodes
1997	The Bill	Irene Stanton	Episode: "Grey Area"
2001	Heartbeat	Eileen Jepson	Episode: "Old Masters"
