= Dangerfield (TV series) =

British television drama series (1995–1999)

- Genre: Medical drama Police procedural
- Starring: Nigel Le Vaillant; Nigel Havers; Nadim Sawalha; Bill Wallis; Amanda Redman; Fiona Victory; George Irving; Michael Melia; Jane Gurnett; Nicola Cowper; Julian Kay; Lisa Faulkner; Tamzin Malleson; Sean Maguire; Tim Vincent; Marcia Warren
- Theme music composer: Nigel Hess; Simon Chamberlain; Ray Russell
- Country of origin: United Kingdom
- Original language: English
- No. of series: 6
- No. of episodes: 62

Production
- Executive producers: Chris Parr; Tony Virgo; Julian Murphy; Julia Ouston; Richard Langridge
- Producers: Adrian Bate; Peter Wolfes; Beverley Dartnall
- Running time: 50 minutes
- Production companies: BBC Pebble Mill Productions; BBC Birmingham

Original release
- Network: BBC1
- Release: 27 January 1995 – 19 November 1999

Dangerfield is a British medical drama television series, first broadcast on BBC One, which described the activities of small-town doctor and police surgeon Paul Dangerfield, played by Nigel Le Vaillant. The series places particular emphasis on Dangerfield's constant struggle to manage the conflicting demands of his two jobs, to come to terms with the death of his wife Celia in a car accident a few years earlier, and to bring up his two initially teenaged, but later grown up, children, Alison and Marty. Six series of the programme were produced, broadcasting from 27 January 1995 until 19 November 1999. After Le Vaillant left the role in 1997, Dr. Jonathan Paige, played by Nigel Havers, became the new central character, after previously appearing in the final two episodes of Le Vaillant's tenure. The BBC decided to end the series in November 1999 when Havers announced his decision to quit. The BBC felt viewers would not find the series credible if the main character was changed for a second time.

The show, like a number of other BBC dramas of the 1980s and 1990s, also featured a number of borderline fantasy episodes. These included "Tricks", "Angel" and "Haunted". The TV trailers for Dangerfield were heavily parodied by The Fast Show, in which the character was called Monkfish and would appear as a tough uncompromising Doctor, Policeman, vet and even as an interior designer – with titles mixed in with other BBC shows of the time. The show was mainly filmed in Warwick, Warwickshire, with some scenes being filmed in neighbouring Leamington Spa. The first two series have since been released on DVD. Dangerfield is regularly shown on UKTV channels Alibi and Drama.

The title theme music, and incidental music, are by Nigel Hess.

In Series 1, Episodes 1, 2 and 3 the piano music that Dangerfield hears when he thinks of his wife, or looks at her piano, is from the Adagio movement of the Piano Concerto No. 2 by Dimitri Shostakovich.

== Cast ==
- Nigel Le Vaillant as Dr. Paul Dangerfield (Series 1–4)
- Nigel Havers as Dr. Jonathan Paige (Guest Series 4; Series 5–6)
- Nadim Sawalha as Dr. Shaaban Hamada (Series 1–5)
- Bill Wallis as Dr. Nick McKenzie (Series 1–5)
- Amanda Redman as Dr. Joanna Stevens (Series 1–2)
- Hilary Lyon as Dr. Roz Parker (Series 2)
- Fiona Victory as Dr. Annie Robbins (Series 3–4)
- George Irving as DI Ken Jackson (Series 1–2)
- Michael Melia as DI Frank Dagley (Series 3–4)
- Jane Gurnett as DI Gillian Kramer (Series 5–6)
- Tracy Gillman as DC Nicky Green (Series 1–2)
- Nicola Cowper as DS Helen Diamond (Series 3–6)
- Ian Gain as DC Gary Monk (Series 5–6)
- Idris Elba as DC Matt Gregory (Series 6)
- Roderick Smith as Sgt. Keith Lardner (Series 1–6)
- Mo Sesay as PC Nigel Spenser (Series 1–2)
- Eleanor Martin as PC Georgie Cudworth (Series 1–4)
- Julian Kay as PC Tom Allen (Series 5–6)
- Lisa Faulkner as Alison Dangerfield (Series 1–2)
- Tamzin Malleson as Alison Dangerfield (Series 3–4)
- Sean Maguire as Marty Dangerfield (Series 1–2)
- Tim Vincent as Marty Dangerfield (Series 3–4)
- Julian Kerridge as Ben Wright (Series 2)
- Jemma Green as Anna (Series 3)
- Catherine Terris as Julia Caxton (Series 1–2)
- Kim Vithana as Kate Durrani (Series 1)
- Jacquetta May as Liz Moss (Series 3)
- Marcia Warren as Angela Wakefield (Series 3–5)
- Hugh Dancy as Charlie Paige (Series 5–6)
- Lynsey Baxter as Beth Saunders (Series 5)
- Frances White as Molly Cramer (Series 5–6)
- Hilary Maclean as Debby Miller (Series 6)

A number of famous actors appeared as guest stars: Keith Allen, Robin Ellis, Edward Hardwicke, Anita Dobson, Brigit Forsyth, Brendan Coyle, Richard Hawley, Michael Elphick, Rachel Davies, Helen Baxendale, David Daker, Stephen Moore, Roberta Taylor, Corin Redgrave, Hilda Braid, Jean Marsh, Denys Hawthorne, John Duttine, Owen Teale, Andrew Lancel, Jim Carter, Mary Healey, Tom Bell, Joe McGann, Haydn Gwynne, Simon Williams, Michelle Holmes, Phyllida Law, Miles Anderson, Robert Pugh, Elizabeth Bennett, Roger Brierley, Colin Baker and Richard Lumsden. Some future stars who also appeared include Kevin Bishop, Adrian Bower, Hannah Waterman, Daniel Ryan and Matty Craig. In addition, Alan Towers, the former main anchor on the local news programme Midlands Today, appeared as a local television reporter in a few episodes.

== Episodes ==
=== Series overview ===
Series	Episodes	Originally released	
Series	Episodes	First released	Last released
1	6	27 January 1995	3 March 1995
2	12	22 September 1995	15 December 1995
3	10	6 September 1996	15 November 1996
4	10	5 September 1997	7 November 1997
5	12	11 September 1998	4 December 1998
6	12	3 September 1999	19 November 1999

=== Series 1 (1995) ===
No.	Title	Directed by	Written by	British air date	UK viewers (million)
1	"Police Brutality"	Jan Sargeant	Don Shaw	27 January 1995	N/A
Black police constable Nigel Spenser arrests suspect Makin in the early hours of the morning and then finds himself faced with a brutality charge. Paul Dangerfield is faced with an ethical dilemma when Spenser's superior, DI Ken Jackson, puts pressure on him to help get Nigel off. Matters are made more irritating for the police surgeon when Ken contacts him in the middle of his first date with sultry barrister Kate Durrani. Things look bad for Nigel until Matthew Evans' body is found in his garden and the property in Makin's car is proved to have been stolen from Evans' house. Elsewhere, the case of a suspicious death involving elderly Sarah Harris, one of Joanna's patients, is solved when her husband Brigadier Harris admits to a mercy killing.
2	"Accidental Shooting"	Jan Sargeant	Don Shaw	3 February 1995	N/A
Paul's son Marty gets caught up in an accidental shooting which results in the death of local farmer Hilton. Matters are further complicated when Joanna misdiagnoses the Keens' colicky baby whose father, mentally ill Roger, is the man who worked for the deceased Hilton and whom DI Jackson suspects of the killing. Later, Paul and Ken Jackson are furious when they learn of Marty's involvement in the accidental shooting because Roger Keen is clearly volatile and mentally unstable. Whilst in police custody, Roger's baby son is rushed to hospital and he is taken to see him. Back at the police station he has a relapse but becomes calmer on being told his baby is all right.
3	"The Patient's Secret"	Jan Sargeant	Don Shaw	10 February 1995	N/A
Stephen Millwood, an old patient of Paul's, is accused of committing arson to claim the insurance money to support his family. Arrested for murder and arson, Stephen tells Paul that he admitted to the crime that his wife Angie really committed. Stephen tells Paul he has AIDS but his first concern is his daughter Sophie, who is about to take an important exam. He persuades Dangerfield to speak to an unconvinced Ken Jackson to get him bail so he can return home. Meanwhile, concerned father Mr Heath brings his daughter Clare to the surgery and demands that she is seen immediately. Later, at school, Clare collapses and is rushed to hospital, where her pregnancy is revealed but the foetus is in the wrong place. She insists her father is not told the truth but it could spell trouble for the practice, when Mr Heath threatens to sue.
4	"Victim of Rape: Part 1"	Diana Patrick	Don Shaw	17 February 1995	N/A
Dangerfield is called to examine suspected rape victim Diane Foster. A man called David Walsh is pulled in on the charge and is represented by Paul's girlfriend, solicitor Kate Durrani. Soon the tension grows between Paul and Kate through their differing views of the case. Meanwhile, DI Jackson puts pressure on Paul to come up with some firm forensic evidence to nail David Walsh.
5	"Victim of Rape: Part 2"	Diana Patrick	Don Shaw	24 February 1995	N/A
Diane Foster, the suspected rape victim, has been attacked again and Dangerfield is called back to the hospital to re-examine her. DI Jackson is convinced that David Walsh committed the crime and Paul is called to court to give evidence. Unfortunately his girlfriend Kate Durrani is acting as solicitor for Walsh – and Dangerfield realises, in time, that he has made an ethical error which puts his relationship with Kate, and the case as a whole, at risk.
6	"Peeping Tom"	Diana Patrick	Don Shaw	3 March 1995	N/A
When it emerges that heart attack victim William Burford has videotaped a couple in an intimate situation, Dangerfield and DI Jackson are faced with a complex moral dilemma. Deciding it best to protect the dead man's wife Lesley and their kids Claire and Michael because he was clearly a 'Peeping Tom', Jackson destroys the videotape. However his actions come back to haunt him when he later learns from Paul that a murdered woman, Susan Wainwright, might have been on the video. Meanwhile closer to home, Alison is worried about her brother Marty and heads off to Wales to find him.

=== Series 2 (1995) ===
No.	Title	Directed by	Written by	British air date	UK viewers (million)
1	"Down by the Riverside"	Richard Holthouse	Nick McCarty	22 September 1995	N/A
When the body of a naked woman is found by a canal, Dangerfield and forensic expert Terri Morgan collaborate to find out her identity and how she died. However, there is a slight discrepancy between medic and police when Paul insists that the woman had a faint pulse – but WPC Cudworth said she was already dead when they arrived on the scene. DI Jackson, eager to avert potential criticism from his team, asks Paul to heed caution before he submits his report. Meanwhile, at the Wickton Road Health Centre, Joanna needs a little of his bedside manner when she has to help convince her elderly father Harry to go into sheltered accommodation upon his release from hospital. Alison is preparing to leave and go to college, and Marty decides to leave school when he gets a job interview.
2	"Death in Custody"	Richard Holthouse	Don Shaw	29 September 1995	N/A
When suspected drugs dealer Stephen Mason is found dead from a head wound after a night in a police cell, suspicion falls immediately on DI Jackson. Elsewhere, the police are called in to a domestic argument involving father and daughter Clifton and Sonia Hilliard. Clifton is arrested and put in a cell for the night, but Sonia is reluctant to reveal why her father beat her. In a desperate attempt to clear his name and save his career, DI Jackson turns to Dangerfield and Terri to unearth a crucial piece of evidence which tragically links the Hilliards to the arrogant Mason. Meanwhile, Alison is settling in at college, and Marty's new job is revealed.
3	"Bones"	Richard Holthouse	Don Shaw	6 October 1995	N/A
When a tree is uprooted in a storm, a skeleton is found and Terri has to use all her expertise to try and find out who he is. Housewife Linda Barton soon becomes the prime suspect, although strangely, she seems more interested in getting her elderly mother Helen Thomas committed than helping the Mid-Warwickshire police find her ex-husband Colin, who walked out on her years ago. Later, the police discover that Helen was a battered wife, and killed her husband in later life when he became ill. The discovery of his body brings the past back to Linda about the suffering her mother had to endure at the hands of her father. When he disappeared, her mother told her he had left them, but she had, in fact, buried him after poisoning him. Convinced it's the only way to stop her mother being charged with his murder, Linda sets about trying to have Helen committed before the law catches up with her. However, deciding that Helen is too old to be arrested, DI Jackson shows his compassionate side by declaring the case closed.
4	"The Stalker"	Richard Holthouse	Nick McCarty	13 October 1995	N/A
Roz and Joanna differ in opinion when they see travelling youngster Rich Collins come in with bruises. Believing Rich to have been abused by his obnoxious stepfather Gerry, DI Jackson sets about trying to nail the man. However, when Dangerfield and Joanna team up to help Jackson crack the case, she becomes the victim of a stalker. Believing Gerry Collins to be the guilty party, Jackson puts him on constant surveillance, only to discover that the culprit is a lot closer to home.
5	"A Dead Businessman"	Catherine Morshead	Don Shaw	20 October 1995	N/A
Joanna and Roz wrestle with a moral dilemma involving the murder of businessman Geoff Hart, found burnt to a crisp in his car in dense woodland. Hart's daughter Susan confesses to Roz during surgery that she murdered him, but Roz refuses to tell the police – declaring confidentiality is of prime importance in her job. Joanna and Dangerfield plead with her to divulge what she knows, and when DI Jackson finds out that Roz is withholding evidence, he puts pressure on her to spill the beans by threatening to arrest her. This still doesn't change stubborn Roz's mind – and it falls to Dangerfield to end up persuading Susan to confess. She eventually does but by a twist of fate, so does her mother Jenny in a bid to cover up her daughter's involvement in the crime. Due to two identical confessions and not enough evidence, DI Jackson cannot charge either of them and he, along with Joanna and Dangerfield, blame Roz for not speaking up sooner. Roz is disgusted by their accusations and promptly resigns from the practice. Meanwhile, Marty gratefully accepts help from one of his pals when he collapses after a basketball game due to his diabetes.
6	"The Call Girl"	Catherine Morshead	Timothy Prager	27 October 1995	N/A
DI Jackson's personal and professional worlds collide when a dark secret from his past comes to light. His colleague, DI Archie Bond, turns up at a police benefit boxing match with a young woman called Crystal, and Ken is clearly stunned by her presence. He obviously knows the escort girl – but how? Lardner is concerned when Ken seemingly becomes obsessed with Crystal and asks Dangerfield to have a word with him. However, Ken is giving nothing away and Dangerfield is left thinking that the girl could be connected with the detective's shady past in the Vice Squad. Then matters come to a head when a case of TB is uncovered at the surgery, but sufferer Gerald Norland seems reluctant to prepare a list of people he may have infected by close contact. Joanna then goes to treat Crystal's baby Emma and realises that the escort has TB also. As the TB is fairly isolated, she puts two and two together and realises that her patient was the one who infected Gerald Norland. When Dangerfield finds out that Crystal's real name is Tara Jackson, he confronts Ken, who reluctantly reveals that she is his estranged daughter.
7	"Body in the Quarry"	Robert Knights	Keith Temple	3 November 1995	N/A
A body is uncovered while Environmental Health remove barrels of toxic waste from the local quarry. The only clue to the victim's identity is the waterlogged patchwork quilt wrapped around the body. Watching the news, the victim's glamorous mother Miriam Lampter recognises the quilt and informs the police that the victim is her missing son James. During their enquiries, DI Jackson and his team soon discover that James was a closet homosexual and having an affair with married Nigel Goss. Initially their prime suspect, Goss is let off the hook when Jackson realises he's innocent – but it's not long before the wily detective focuses his attentions on the Lampter family, in particular James' brother Daniel, with shocking results. Dangerfield is badgered to take some holiday leave by Marty and MacKenzie. Taking their advice, he decides to invite Joanna away with him for a long weekend. Meanwhile, lovebirds Alison and Ben go camping in Snowdonia but the fun soon turns to tragedy when the pair become stranded in the rugged country.
8	"An S.A.S. Death"	Robert Knights	Don Shaw	10 November 1995	N/A
When the body of SAS officer Tom Sunderland is found in a shallow grave, DI Jackson becomes caught up in a messy love triangle involving Sunderland's wife Lucy and his best friend, fellow army officer Sean Brook. As the dead man's GP, Joanna finds herself increasingly involved in the case when she realises that only weeks before, Sunderland told her his wife was out to kill him. Was Sunderland the victim of a crime of passion or was he simply delusional and suffering from paranoia? It's a sad day for the Dangerfields as the family, along with Joanna, attend Alison's boyfriend Ben's funeral. Alison is inconsolable and blames herself for his death. To assuage her grief, she gets drunk and hysterically throws herself at one of Ben's friends. Meanwhile, Marty walks out on his job as a dishwasher and makes a conscious decision to go back to university and study disabled sports.
9	"The Unfaithful Husband"	Graham Moore	Roy McGregor	17 November 1995	N/A
Dangerfield becomes involved in the case of his long-time patient, businessman Patrick Hooper, when he leaves his wife Margaret to embark on a new relationship with attractive Caroline White. However, Hooper claims to Dangerfield that Caroline has been receiving threatening letters from an allegedly unhinged Margaret and as a result, Paul asks a reluctant Joanna to try and find out whether Margaret is showing signs of mental instability. Later, events take a tragic turn as Hooper's mistress Caroline is killed. DI Jackson and his team find themselves in the middle of a sinister family triangle as both Margaret and the Hoopers' son Thomas end up as prime suspects in Caroline's murder – however, all is not what it appears and with Terri's help, the police discover that the blame lies in an unexpected quarter.
10	"The Norfolk Holiday: Part 1"	Brian Farnham	Roy McGregor	1 December 1995	N/A
When the Dangerfields go on holiday to Norfolk, they get more than they bargained for when the peaceful rural atmosphere is shattered following the suspicious death of highly strung Susan Wood, a woman who happens to be amongst the guests at a barbecue attended by Paul and his children on their arrival. Alison and Marty spot Susan being aggressively manhandled by her husband Hugh, and Dangerfield is forced to become involved in the case throughout the duration of his holiday. Meanwhile, back in Warwickshire, insurance salesman Brian Ashley is knocked down by a hit and run driver when he comes out of housewife Sandra Lennox's home following an illicit tryst. Not wanting to speak to the police, Ashley leaves the crime scene. Later, DI Jackson and his team soon discover that this is no ordinary case of hit-and-run, and end up on the doorstep of alcoholic Frank Talbot, who was behind the wheel. However, although Talbot is clearly guilty of running Ashley over, events take a tragic twist when the victim is finally killed by none other than his best friend Mick Lennox, the husband of his lover Sandra.
11	"The Norfolk Holiday: Part 2"	Brian Farnham	Roy McGregor	8 December 1995	N/A
As Dangerfield uncovers more facts behind Susan Wood's death, he also realises that he's becoming very attracted to the beautiful Rachel Palmer. His love-life becomes ever more complicated when Joanna decides to take a trip to Norfolk to surprise him and is left decidedly unimpressed when she stumbles on Paul and Rachel enjoying a cosy tea together. Meanwhile, back in Warwickshire, there is a break-in at the health centre and Shaaban is assaulted. At the same time, Joanna deals with young mother Penny Noakes, and is concerned when she discovers Penny's boyfriend Alan Gordon is excessively violent. However, Joanna later discovers that Gordon was the one responsible for robbing the surgery and scared that he might have inherited schizophrenia from his father, the young father finally flips and takes Joanna hostage following a routine house call. DI Jackson becomes involved and dashes to the scene, relieved when Joanna comes out of the ordeal unscathed. To smooth over stormy waters, Joanna decides to lie to Alan and tells him that on viewing his medical records, he can't possibly inherit schizophrenia from his father because that wasn't his real dad.
12	"The Little Bosnian Girl"	Graham Moore	Timothy Prager	15 December 1995	N/A
Dangerfield finds himself in an awkward situation when his aid worker friend Mary Blanchard asks him to look after an illegal immigrant, young orphan Adriana, whose family were wiped out by a bomb in Bosnia. Agreeing to help out temporarily, Dangerfield introduces her to Alison and Marty. When Joanna meets Adriana, she bonds with her immediately and the two soon become inseparable, so much so that when Adriana wanders off by herself and gets caught shoplifting, Joanna and Paul have the same idea of passing her off as their niece when DI Jackson suggests calling in social services. Later, Mary returns and informs Joanna and Paul that she has to take Adriana back to Bosnia but Joanna, still very keen on the youngster, agrees to look after her for a longer period. She even shocks Dangerfield by suggesting that the two of them apply to adopt Adriana and for the first time. However, their happiness is tragically short-lived when the little girl suddenly collapses with a massive heart attack and dies. Consumed by grief, Joanna decides to leave Warwickshire to accompany Adriana's body back to Bosnia and to start a new life there.

=== Series 3 (1996) ===
No.	Title	Directed by	Written by	British air date	UK viewers (million)
1	"Behind Closed Doors"	Jim Goddard	Don Shaw	6 September 1996	N/A
Dangerfield finds his job under threat as he becomes involved in a political feud between Warwickshire's Chief Constable and the local council. Meanwhile, Alison and Marty leave him considering whether to let go of past worries.
2	"Tricks"	Jim Goddard	Peter J. Hammond	13 September 1996	N/A
A seemingly routine suicide case leads Dangerfield into the world of the paranormal when the victim's wife hints that malevolent forces were involved in her husband's death. Meanwhile, Alison and Marty find their dad's plans disturbing.
3	"Treasure"	Jim Goddard	Suj Ahmed	20 September 1996	N/A
When a young boy with a serious medical condition is abducted, the police enlist Dangerfield's help to save his life – even though they have no idea where the child is being hidden. Meanwhile, Angela seems to have adopted the Health Centre and can't be moved, while Alison has a surprising revelation for her father.
4	"Scars"	Rob Walker	Barbara Cox	27 September 1996	N/A
Dangerfield is called in when PC Dave Chapman, a long-standing officer with more than 35 years service in the force, is accused of assaulting a suspect in his custody. During the course of his investigation, Dangerfield discovers that a police surgeon's job is about more than crime-solving when he begins to analyse Chapman's ongoing pattern of odd behaviour. Marty finds helping a homeless girl more than he bargained for, and Dangerfield's decision to move house proves the start of a new chapter.
5	"Trial"	Rob Walker	Don Shaw	4 October 1996	N/A
Dangerfield is called to give evidence as a prosecution witness at a murder trial, but during cross examination from the defendant's defence barrister, his impartiality is severely tested. The pressure of the case puts DI Dagley's friendship with DS Diamond under strain. The success of the trial depends on the defendant's mother watching every move. Meanwhile, a detective from Leicestershire CID arrives with suspicions that the defendant was responsible for another murder during his bail period.
6	"Eden"	Rob Walker	Peter J. Hammond	11 October 1996	N/A
Alison goes in search of peace, but discovers the countryside can be a brutal place when she runs into woodlander John Rust. He's trying to protect local wildlife from a gang of thugs who are setting animal traps, and the police get involved when a lethal snare is discovered. Later, an arson attack destroys farm equipment belonging to a local land owner, and Rust becomes chief suspect. Meanwhile, Annie deals with a suicide pact involving a mother and her young baby daughter, who turn out to be relatives of Rust.
7	"Still Waters"	Jim Goddard	Peter J. Hammond	18 October 1996	N/A
Dangerfield investigates when a romantic evening by the water ends in a suicide pact, but when the police recover the body of a young woman, they discover her lover's body has disappeared. The post mortem reveals the woman died before drowning, and the murder enquiry focuses on two supposed wives associated with the missing man.
8	"Games"	Rob Walker	Peter J. Hammond	25 October 1996	N/A
Dangerfield and his colleagues at the practice become concerned when patients report home visits by a GP using their surgery's name as a calling card. With patients' lives seemingly put at risk, the police are asked to investigate. Paul is worried that his reputation is being violated by someone who seems to know his every move.
9	"Old Dog, Old Tricks"	Jim Goddard	Alick Rowe	8 November 1996	N/A
Following the death of his wife, William Ashurst, an old friend of Paul Dangerfield's father, returns to the area of his childhood. Initially regarded with suspicion by the residents of the Foxwood estate, their worst fears are soon realised when Ashurst's dog bites one of the local children. Paul suddenly finds himself embroiled in an increasingly volatile situation as he defends the old man's actions. When Ashurst falls victim to a gang of teenage tearaways who tell the police he molested them, Dangerfield refuses to believe he is guilty and sets out to help him.
10	"Inside Out"	Rob Walker	Tony Etchells	15 November 1996	N/A
A prisoner confides in Dangerfield following a prison riot. When the same prisoner later dies in police custody, Dangerfield becomes emotionally involved and is determined to follow through with the investigation, which leads to an extraordinary conclusion. Meanwhile, on the home front, Marty is determined to help Al in her hour of need, when she goes into labour. Will Dangerfield drop everything and make it to the hospital in time?

=== Series 4 (1997) ===
No.	Title	Directed by	Written by	British air date	UK viewers (million)
1	"Inappropriate Adults"	Lawrence Gordon Clark	Michael Jenner	5 September 1997	N/A
Dangerfield examines a cot death at a remote farmhouse and finds the baby died in mysterious circumstances. Events reveal that the mother couldn't have killed the baby, so the search is on for the missing father.
2	"Perfect Witness"	Ken Hannam	Gwyneth Hughes	12 September 1997	N/A
During Dangerfield's examination of Jayne Sharman, it transpires that she was raped six weeks earlier. By an apparent coincidence, one of Dr Robbins' patients, who is recovering from hepatitis, was also raped. Then Jayne is rushed to hospital with hepatitis. The police suspect a link between the two cases, but with one victim dying and the other refusing to give evidence, they have difficulty in bringing the case to court.
3	"Blood Money"	Ken Hannam	Amanda Coe	19 September 1997	N/A
Alison tries to help a young foreign national who is beaten up by a vicious gang. Meanwhile, Dangerfield investigates a body found on a nearby farm, and discovers a possible immigration scam involving cheap foreign labourers being illegally trafficked into the country – unaware that Alison's new acquaintance could be the ringleader of the gang, and that she could be in grave danger. Meanwhile, Angela's continuing search for love leads her into the path of a wealthy aristocrat.
4	"Happy Families"	Lawrence Gordon Clark	Jo O'Keefe	26 September 1997	N/A
Dangerfield investigates the drowning of a young girl, whose body is found floating in the local river. He questions why, as a devout student, she would have decided to create a false identity. He discovers her links to a local family are anything but honest, and suspects that the man that she was working for could have played a part in her death. The discovery of a drugs operation running inside a local farm leads Dangerfield to suspect there is more to the case than meets the eye.
5	"House Calls"	Jo Johnson	Tony McHale	3 October 1997	N/A
Dangerfield assists a woman involved in an RTA, in which a prisoner on day release managed to abscond, but is concerned when he visits her at home, and her husband starts to become very cagey. Meanwhile, Angela has arranged a dinner party and has invited her practice colleagues to meet her new beau, Colin. However, Dangerfield's conscience and interest leads him to pay a further call to the RTA victim, leading him into a potentially volatile and life threatening hostage situation.
6	"Guilt"	Jo Johnson	Michael Baker	10 October 1997	N/A
The death of an insurance broker, who is found at the wheel of his car in a local lake, peaks Dangerfield's interest after he suspect the victim sustained the injuries which caused his death before he hit the water. He becomes concerned when the man's wife, who is pregnant, tries to commit suicide, leading him to suspect that she may have been having an affair, and that the baby may not have been his. Matters are further complicated when Dangerfield discovers her boyfriend is actually her brother.
7	"Adam"	Simon Meyers	Robert Jones	17 October 1997	N/A
Dagley issues an appeal regarding the disappearance of a young girl, unaware that her boyfriend, who has lied to the police and her family, was responsible for her death and the disposal of her body. To make matters worse, Dangerfield is asked by Nick, who is the boy's godfather, to keep a protective eye over him and ensure that the police are not subjecting him to any unnecessary questioning. However, Dangerfield soon starts to become increasingly suspicions over the boy's erratic behaviour.
8	"Contact"	Simon Meyers	Amanda Coe	24 October 1997	N/A
Dangerfield is asked to assess three young boys who have been arrested for possession of ecstasy. However, when one of the boys collapses in his cell, he is taken to hospital showing signs of a possible overdose. The boy's mother is adamant that her son would have not have bought drugs willingly, and that he may have been influenced by his two friends. However, Dangerfield makes a shocking discovery after speaking to a prostitute that leads him to believe the boy has contracted meningitis.
9	"Lasting Relief"	Lawrence Gordon Clark	Tony McHale	31 October 1997	N/A
Dangerfield takes on the case of Neil Hanson, a lung cancer sufferer who suddenly collapses and dies following his 50th birthday party. Initial suspicion falls on his GP, Dr. Jonathan Paige, who injected Hanson with a dose of morphine shortly before the party. Dagley is adamant that Paige has overstepped the mark, and threatens to open a can of worms by setting out to prove his guilt. However, the man's wife makes a shock confession, leading Dangerfield to suspect she may be protecting the couple's son.
10	"And the Lips That We Might Tell"	Lawrence Gordon Clark	Michael Jenner	7 November 1997	N/A
A fatal RTA and the hijacking of a lorry by an armed gang sees Dangerfield called upon to act as star witness in the trial of a man whom Dagley suspects was involved. When the gang begin to target Dangerfield, he realises that he has been drawn into a deadly game of cat and mouse. As Dangerfield tries to help the suspect's daughter come to terms with her father's actions, he receives a surprising job offer from the University of Auckland – leading him to make the shock decision to start a new life.

=== Series 5 (1998) ===
This was the first series to feature Nigel Havers as the primary character, Dr. Jonathan Paige. Jane Gurnett was similarly introduced as the new main investigating officer in the series, D.I. Gillian Kramer. Many of the cast from the two previous series were retained; with the exception of Michael Melia, Tim Vincent, Tamzin Malleson and Fiona Victory. This series was broadcast at 9:35pm on Fridays. Viewing figures for this series was strong enough for a sixth series to be commissioned.

No.	Title	Directed by	Written by	British air date	UK viewers (million)
1	"Local Colour"	Lawrence Gordon Clark	Tony McHale	11 September 1998	7.51m
The body of a local farmer found dumped under a rubbish pile at a local funfair leads Paige right into the centre of a complex set of family relationships. With three possible murderers, and two possible motives, can he and new DI Gillian Kramer get to the bottom of who was responsible? Meanwhile, when Paige announces a reshuffle at the surgery, Dr. McKenzie expresses his dislike at the idea, leading Paige to offer him a few words of advice and question if he still has the passion for the job.
2	"The Long Weekend"	Lawrence Gordon Clark	Peter Pallister	18 September 1998	6.58m
A mass brawl inside a pub which subsequently causes a chip pan fire scuppers Paige's plans for a quiet weekend. All seems to be under control until one of the victims involved in the brawl begins to recount events of an attack and a possible murder. DI Kramer isn't convinced, but Paige suspects that he may actually have witnessed an incident that the police have yet to discover. Meanwhile, Dr. McKenzie suggests that Paige take up a membership at the local driving range to relieve the stresses of work.
3	"A Place of Safety"	Ken Hannam	Simon Tyrell	25 September 1998	6.97m
Paige tries to help a young schizophrenic boy who is arrested after a campaign of harassment. Paige decides against having him sectioned, but the next day, his mother is found murdered, and Kramer begins to think that Paige may have badly misjudged the situation. Later, when a four-year-old disappears, the boy is once again suspected, and it's up to Paige to act as negotiator. Meanwhile, Dr. McKenzie deals with a young heroin-addicted couple who discover that they are expecting a baby.
4	"Moulded of Things Past"	Ken Hannam	Peter Palliser	2 October 1998	7.20m
Paige investigates the murder of Eileen Courtney, who is found dead in the bath, having drowned in her own blood. Her elderly husband, Stanley, whom Paige has recently treated for a burn on his hand, has recently been diagnosed with Alzhiemers. But when he confesses to the murder, Kramer has no choice but to arrest him. However, Paige soon begins to suspect that the 'murder' he is recounting is that of his first wife, who drowned more than thirty years ago in an accident on a boating lake.
5	"The Last Picture"	Tim Holloway	Susan Wilkins	9 October 1998	7.48m
Paige investigates the death of a local artist, Elanor Dyson, who is found dead after taking an overdose of insulin. Her agent appears to be less than clean cut, and when Paige discovers that the insulin actually belonged to her, she is pulled in for questioning. When she later confesses to murder, Paige is unconvinced and suspects she may be trying to cover up a dark secret surrounding Elanor's life. Meanwhile, Paige clashes with a new locum, Dr. Brooke, over sleeping pills prescribed to one of his patients.
6	"Silence Has Rhythm Too"	Tim Holloway	Matthew Bardsley	16 October 1998	6.99m
A dispute between neighbours over loud music boils over when the antagonist is found murdered, having been strangled with headphone wire. The suspect, Brian James, who is a patient of Paige's, denies murder and Paige seems inclined to believe him. However, when his past history with the police comes to light, Paige begins to doubt his trust in Brian. Meanwhile, Shaaban has a seemingly uncharacteristic outburst at one of his patients, leading to him to review his future with the practice – and as a doctor.
7	"Paths"	Lawrence Gordon Clark	Colin Wyatt	23 October 1998	N/A
Paige's son is brought into police custody after being attacked by a masked gang outside a bowling alley, but his incarceration allows for some father and son bonding time. The reason for his visit, however, is to meet up with an old school friend who is being forced to sell his father's farm due to increasing costs and lack of viability. When the pair meet at an anti-government protest, it proves to be the catalyst for a dramatic showdown where two victims are left hurt, forcing Paige and his son to play the heroes.
8	"Angel"	Sharon Miller	Tom Needham	30 October 1998	6.87m
A gardener is found dead, having fallen from the basket of a hot air balloon. No foul play is initially suspected, until a post mortem report discovers injuries which do not appear to have been caused by the fall. Meanwhile, Paige is called upon for help by the mother and father of a young girl at the care home where the victim worked. Their daughter, Lucy, has been in a coma following an accident 12 months previously – but Paige suspects her condition may be connected to the victim's death.
9	"Fall from Grace"	Sharon Miller	Tony McHale	6 November 1998	6.58m
A housewife is killed after falling from a roof in a rainstorm. Her husband, Joe, is devastated by her death and refuses to leave the house, even to attend her funeral. Paige offers his support to the family, but his pleas fall on deaf ears, until Joe accidentally stabs his son during an argument. Meanwhile, Paige and his new girlfriend invite his colleagues from the surgery over for a dinner party, and are surprised when Dr. McKenzie brings along a striking young blonde as his dinner companion.
10	"The Lost Boy"	Lawrence Gordon Clark	Tony Mulholland	13 November 1998	N/A
A series of blackmail letters, the suicide of a stockbroker and the disappearance of six-year-old John Marriner from the local primary school provides Paige with a complex web of problems. Among them all is a young schoolgirl, Alison Hunter, whose life was turned upside down after the disappearance of her younger brother Stevie six years ago. When the truth surrounding Stevie's disappearance finally boils to the surface, Paige and Kramer realise it's a race against time to save young John.
11	"Harvest Time"	Jim Shields	Matthew Bardsley	27 November 1998	N/A
A critical incident breaks out a local safe house during police downtime for a major international friendly between England and Italy. A protected witness, Bailey, comes under fire from a sniper. Already at the house following a complaint of mishandling from Bailey, Paige and Kramer become caught in the crossfire, and a young DC, Christian, is accidentally shot dead by the hitman. After managing to pull Bailey to safety, he escapes through an open window, and in the ensuing chaos, Kramer is shot.
12	"Double Helix"	Jim Shields	Peter Palliser	4 December 1998	N/A
With Kramer still recovering in hospital, Diamond is made acting DI. The murder of an Australian hitchhiker in nearby woods leads Diamond to suspect that serial murderer, responsible for three other deaths, has struck again. With the possibility of a major investigation on her hands, borough DCI Miller brings in cocky new DI Dickerson, who manages to rub everyone up the wrong way. Paige is asked to retest a group of contaminated blood samples, but soon finds himself an enemy of the prime suspect.

=== Series 6 (1999) ===
No.	Title	Directed by	Written by	British air date	UK viewers (million)
1	"Gas Man"	Jim Shields	Stuart Morris	3 September 1999	5.99m
Just as Paige rushes to catch the train to attend Kramer's commendation ceremony, a serious gas explosion rocks the centre of Warwick. Paige manages to pull a victim of the blast to safety; but the man later dies in hospital. New forensic detective Matt Gregory (Idris Elba) uncovers forensic evidence, which coupled with a witness statement, leads the team to suspect Clive Daniels (Tim Dantay) of being responsible. Meanwhile, Helen narrowly avoids injury when she becomes the target of a second gas attack, forcing Kramer and Paige to enter into a deadly game of cat and mouse – which results in an armed showdown between Daniels and Paige in the grounds of Warwick castle.
2	"Instinct"	Jim Shields	Jenny Lecoat	10 September 1999	6.47m
Paige offers support to acid attack victim Rhona Bishop (Michelle Holmes), who seven years previously, was also kidnapped and held to ransom. Kramer suspects that despite the victim's claims, her kidnapper, Stuart McAire (Tom Cotcher) is not responsible for the attack, and that the offender is someone closer to home. When an acid package is delivered to Rhona in the post, Kramer decides not to take any chances and organises surveillance to follow McAire. However, as a clear forensic picture begins to emerge, suspicion falls upon Rhona's husband Kevin (Sean Gilder) and his workmates. But as the team struggle to find any motive for their involvement, another suspect comes to light.
3	"Chasing Shadows"	Kim Flitcroft	Graham Mitchell	17 September 1999	6.94m
Kramer is the subject of an internal enquiry when pregnant drink driver Ellie Edmunds collapses in custody, and subsequently suffers a miscarriage. With no witnesses to the incident, Paige's loyalties are tested when he struggles to believe her version of events. As Ellie's husband Bryn (Thomas Craig) tries to press Kramer for the truth, the identity of the baby's father is called into question. When it transpires that Ellie had been having an affair with her brother-in-law, Tommy (Richard Huw), Paige discovers that just hours prior to her arrest, Ellie attended a local clinic for an abortion. Paige's relationship with Debbie continues to blossom, while Gregory continues his pursuit of Kramer.
4	"Hidden Desires"	Jim Shields	Kathrine Smith	24 September 1999	6.65m
The disappearance of a 14-year-old Jade Prior from a local council estate leads Paige to question the credibility of the police's only witness, Danny Austin, who just 24 hours after the disappearance, suffers from a mental episode caused by the effects of a drugs overdose. As a search of the local area gets underway, the pressure of the situation forces Jade's pregnant mum, Karen, to enter premature labour. As Paige begins to recover information from Danny, Jade's stepbrother, Lee (Craig Heaney), comes under suspicion after a stash of drugs is found in his bedroom. As Danny finally opens up, police divers fish a body from the local river, much to the devastation of Jade's parents.
5	"Through a Glass, Darkly"	Kim Flitcroft	Lynne Dallow	1 October 1999	7.14m
A seemingly routine nightclub assault takes a surprising twist when one of the victims, Jamie (Del Synott), makes a shocking accusation against Paige after he expresses his dislike for gay men. As Paige's actions are called into question, the 28th Warwickshire Policeman's Ball gets underway, and Helen is shocked to catch Sgt. Lardener (Roderick Smith) red-handed stealing from the charity raffle. Lardener claims that his wife, who is suffering from MS, has been given only a year to live, and that her excessive spending has resulted in a string of debts. Meanwhile, Paige confides in Kramer, and claims that outburst was a result of his father having cheated on his mother with another man.
6	"Forbidden Fruit"	Brett Fallis	Lille Ferrari	8 October 1999	6.89m
A routine Home Office immigration raid on a fruit farm goes badly wrong when PC Allen (Julian Kay) is shot in the leg by an unknown assailant. An unimpressed S019 sergeant, Waverley (Richard Lynch), accuses Sgt. Lardener of failing to protect his colleague in the field. When one of the prime suspects, James Bassett (Shane Taylor), is later found with a nasty head wound, Helen suspects Sgt. Lardener of being responsible. Meanwhile, as the illegals rounded up in the raid are processed through custody, Paige and Gregory are unexpectedly forced to leap into action when it transpires that one of the young female workers, Elena Burhala, is heavily pregnant and is about to go into labour.
7	"The End of the Affair"	Kim Flitcroft	Peter Palliser	15 October 1999	N/A
The suspected overdose of drug dealer Paul Campbell, who is found dead in a council flat in Warwick, leads Kramer into an unexpected reunion with her ex-husband, DI David Moore (Nick Dunning), whose department is being investigated for the disappearance of a substantial amount of heroin from a drugs raid. As the investigation progresses, Kramer unknowingly risks the life of Campbell's best friend, Brian Nowak, who like Campbell, was known to be working as a police informant. Meanwhile, Paige's relationship with Debbie reaches a sudden conclusion, and when PC Allen is accused of assault, an unimpressed Helen rebuts Paige for failing to corroborate Allen's version of events.
8	"Diminished Responsibility"	Brett Fallis	Peter Palliser	22 October 1999	N/A
Paige is called to give evidence at the murder trial of cocaine addict Tim Morand, who is accused of beating one of his associates to death in a row over money. However, Paige's testimony causes friction within the team as he appears to be swaying the jury towards a verdict of diminished responsibility on the grounds of mental insanity. Love is in the air for Gary Monk as holiday romance Ana (Sonya Walger) flies in from Spain to declare her unrequited love for him, unaware that Gary doesn't feel quite the same way about her. Helen is angered by Gregory's continued pursuit of Kramer, and confides in Paige, confessing that she and Gregory have been in a relationship for some time.
9	"Haunted"	Brett Fallis	Richard Monks	29 October 1999	N/A
When Margaret Dudgen falls to her death from the first floor window of her country home, suspicion falls upon her mentally ill husband John (Dafydd Hywel). However, recurring stories of a ghost haunting the house lead Helen and Gary to the local vicar (Colin Baker), with whom Margaret was suspected of having an affair. Meanwhile, Kramer becomes the talk of the station when news of her one-night stand with Gregory becomes public knowledge. As the investigation into Margaret's death continues, her son, Hugh, becomes prime suspect when it transpires that he has been trying to force his parents into selling the house in order to build eight new affordable homes.
10	"A Day in the Country"	Delyth Thomas	Paul Mousley	5 November 1999	N/A
Whilst visiting a patient at the county hospital, Paige is taken hostage by an armed prisoner, Terry Hughes (Joe Duttine), after Hughes himself is the target of an assassination attempt. Paige discovers that Hughes, who is serving a five-year sentence for his involvement in a bank robbery, was attending the hospital in the company of an armed prison guard to undergo tests for epilepsy. Concerned that his state of mind could trigger an epileptic fit, Paige tries to convince Hughes to give himself up; but as a pursuit ensues across the Warwickshire countryside, the pair find themselves caught up in the middle of a local carnival procession, where Kramer and an Armed Response unit lie in wait.
11	"Something Personal"	Delyth Thomas	Stuart Morris	12 November 1999	N/A
Having been expelled from a local boarding school, wayward student Gavin Kirkdale (Tom Burke)'s celebrations are cut short when his best friend, Naomi, is mown down and killed in a hit and run. As Gavin recovers from the shock of the incident, he accuses his former teacher, Marcus Baxter, of being the driver. As a hate campaign against Baxter ensues, school principal Donald Howson (James Laurenson) tries to protect Marcus by offering him a false alibi. Meanwhile, Gregory is implicated in an aggravated assault on his sister's ex-boyfriend, and asks Paige to prove his innocence. And as Gillian prepares to call time on their relationship, Paige is forced to finally declare his true feelings.
12	"Tying the Knot"	Delyth Thomas	Lynne Dallow	19 November 1999	6.73m
As preparations for Paige and Kramer's wedding get underway, proceedings are interrupted by the discovery of a young boy bound and gagged in a local wood. Paige recognises the hallmarks of the case and links it to a series of similar incidents in Oxford five years ago. Kramer discovers that the Oxford perpetrator, Darren Sullivan, is deceased, but Paige's suspicions remain heightened after he seemingly catches Sullivan leaving a local pub. As Paige's son arrives from Nairobi to act as his best man, all seems to be going to plan until the morning of the ceremony, when on her way to the church, Kramer spots Sullivan – alive and well – holding a kidnapped child in his van.

== DVD releases ==
The first two series were released on DVD in the United Kingdom. The entire 6 series were released on DVD in Germany. As common with many releases of British series in Europe the DVDs contain the original (English) soundtrack but the menu, subtitles and packaging are in German. It is unclear whether the rest of the series will get a DVD release in the United Kingdom. Both releases are encoded Region 2 discs.

There has also been an Australian release of Series 1 and 2; these are encoded Region 4.
