= Empress Catherine (disambiguation) =

Empress Catherine (1729–1796; r. 1762–1796) was Empress of Russia.

Empress Catherine may also refer to:

- Catherine of Bulgaria, consort of Isaac I Komnenos, Byzantine emperor
- Catherine I, Latin Empress (1274–1307), titular Latin empress of Constantinople
- Catherine II, Latin Empress (1303–1346), titular Latin empress of Constantinople
- Catherine I of Russia (1684–1727; r. 1725–1727), Empress of Russia
- Empress Catherine of Central Africa (born 1949), consort of Emperor Bokassa I

== See also ==
- Catherine II (disambiguation)
- Catherine the Great (disambiguation)
- Princess Catherine (disambiguation)
- Queen Catherine (disambiguation)
- Saint Petersburg Mining University of Empress Catherine II, Russia
