= Katherine Tudor =

Katherine Tudor may refer to:

- Katherine Woodville, Duchess of Bedford, wife of Jasper Tudor
- Katherine Tudor, Princess of England, daughter of Henry VII of England and Elizabeth of York
- Katheryn of Berain, Welsh noblewoman also known as Katherine Tudor
- Katherine of Aragon, Queen of England and first wife of Henry Tudor (Henry VIII) and only wife of Arthur Tudor
- Katherine Howard, Queen of England and fifth wife of Henry VIII
- Katherine Parr, Queen of England and sixth wife of Henry VIII
- Lady Katherine Grey, great-granddaughter of the first Tudor king, Henry VII, and sister of the ill-fated Lady Jane.
