= Cambridge Science Festival =

Science festival in Cambridge, England

The 2015 Cambridge Science Festival logo.

The Cambridge Science Festival was a series of events typically held annually in March in Cambridge, England and was the United Kingdom's largest free science festival. In 2019 it was announced that the Cambridge Science Festival and the Cambridge Festival of Ideas would be combined into one festival. The Cambridge Festival took place for the first time in March 2021.

The festival attracts more than 30,000 visitors to over 250 events. University researchers and students open their lecture halls and laboratories to the general public, and hold Talks, Exhibitions and Demonstrations, mostly free of charge.

Started in 1994 by scientists of the University of Cambridge and backed by local businesses, the festival was inspired by National Science Week and is aimed making science and engineering more accessible, showcasing research performed at Cambridge University, and encouraging young people to pursue careers in engineering and science.

== Gallery ==
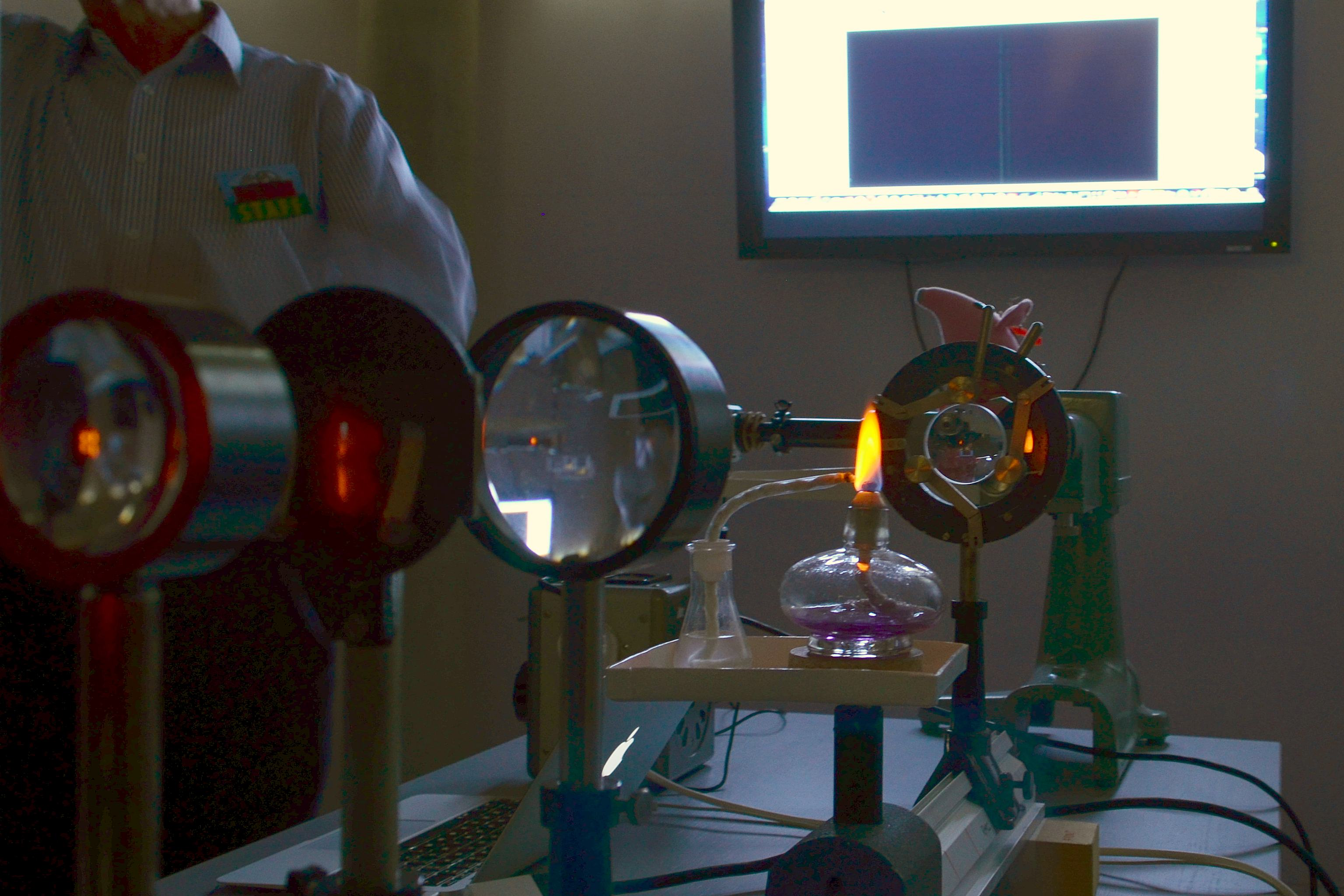
A demonstration of the emission sodium D lines at the 2016 Cambridge Science Festival.

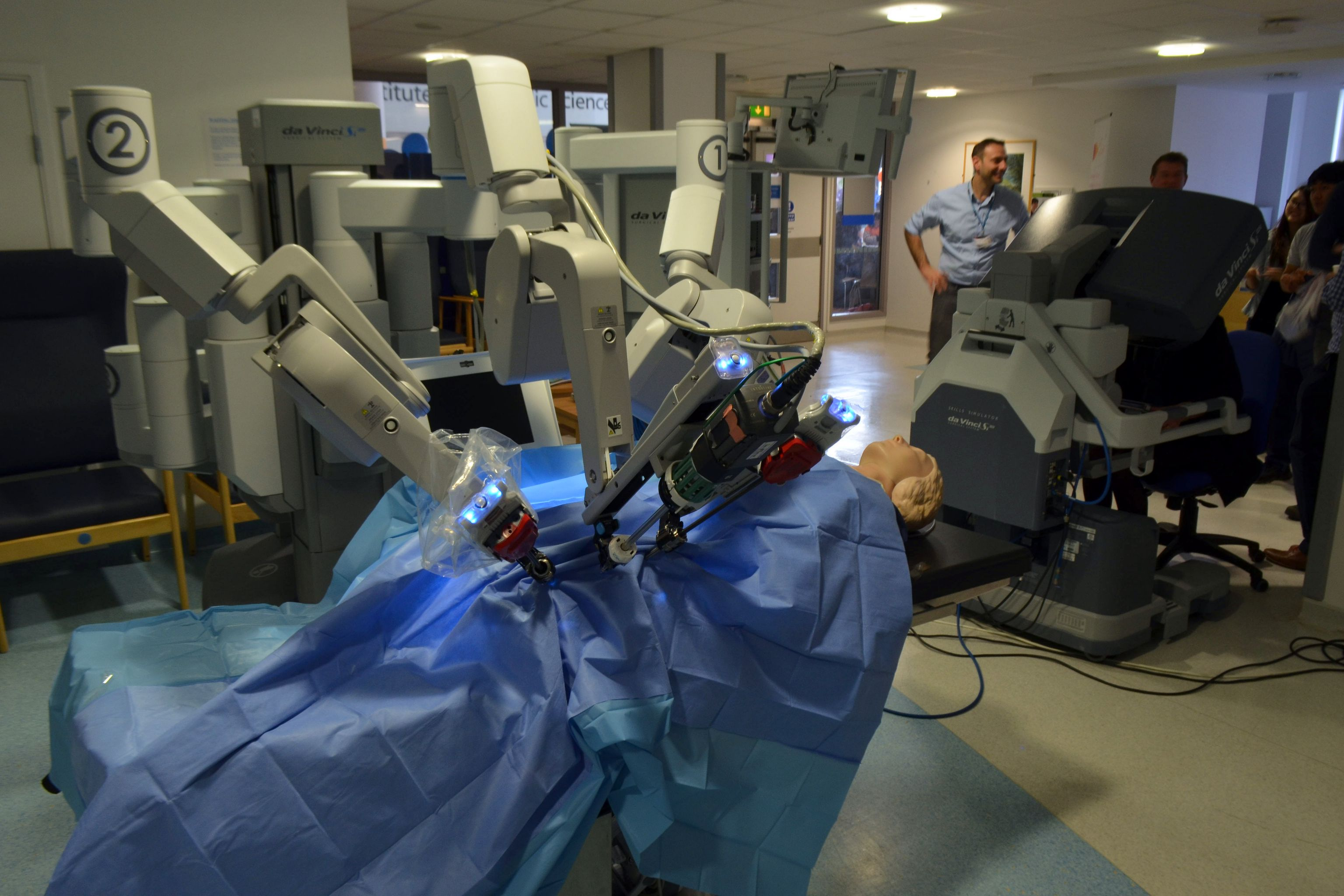
A demonstration of the da Vinci Surgical System at the Addenbrooke's Treatment Centre during the 2015 festival.

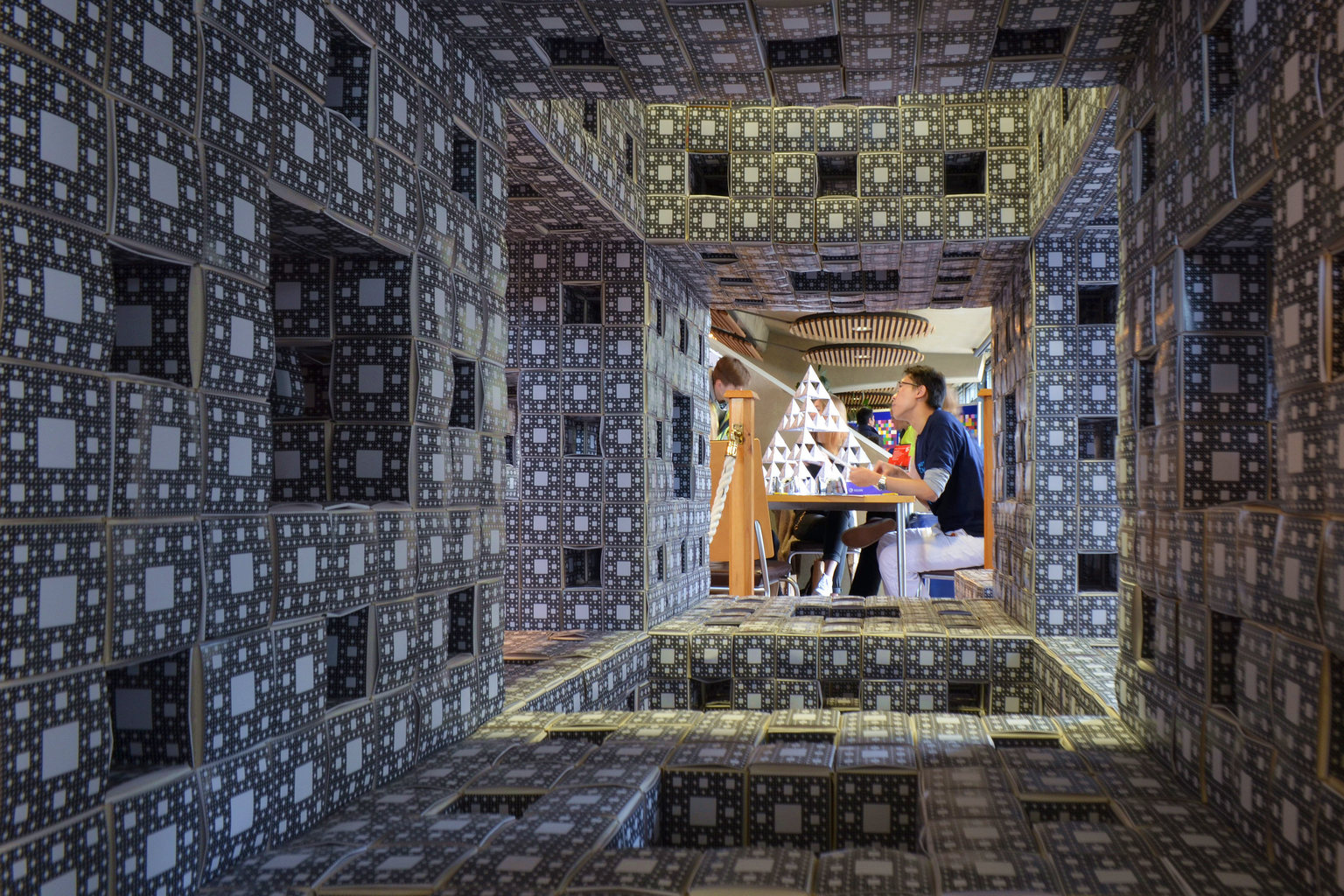
A model of a Sierpinski tetrahedron viewed through a model of a Menger sponge at the 2015 festival.

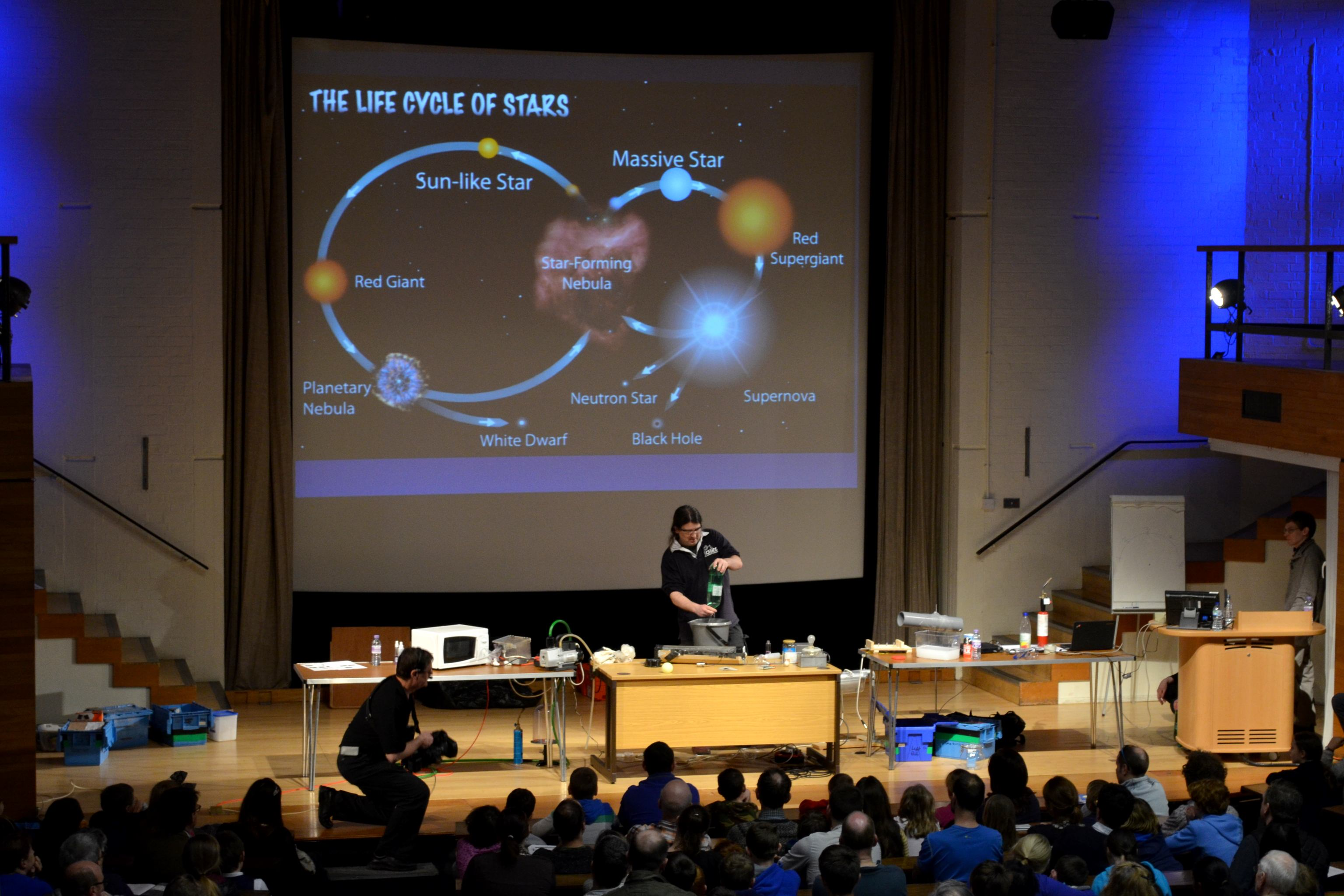
A talk and demonstration at the 2014 festival.

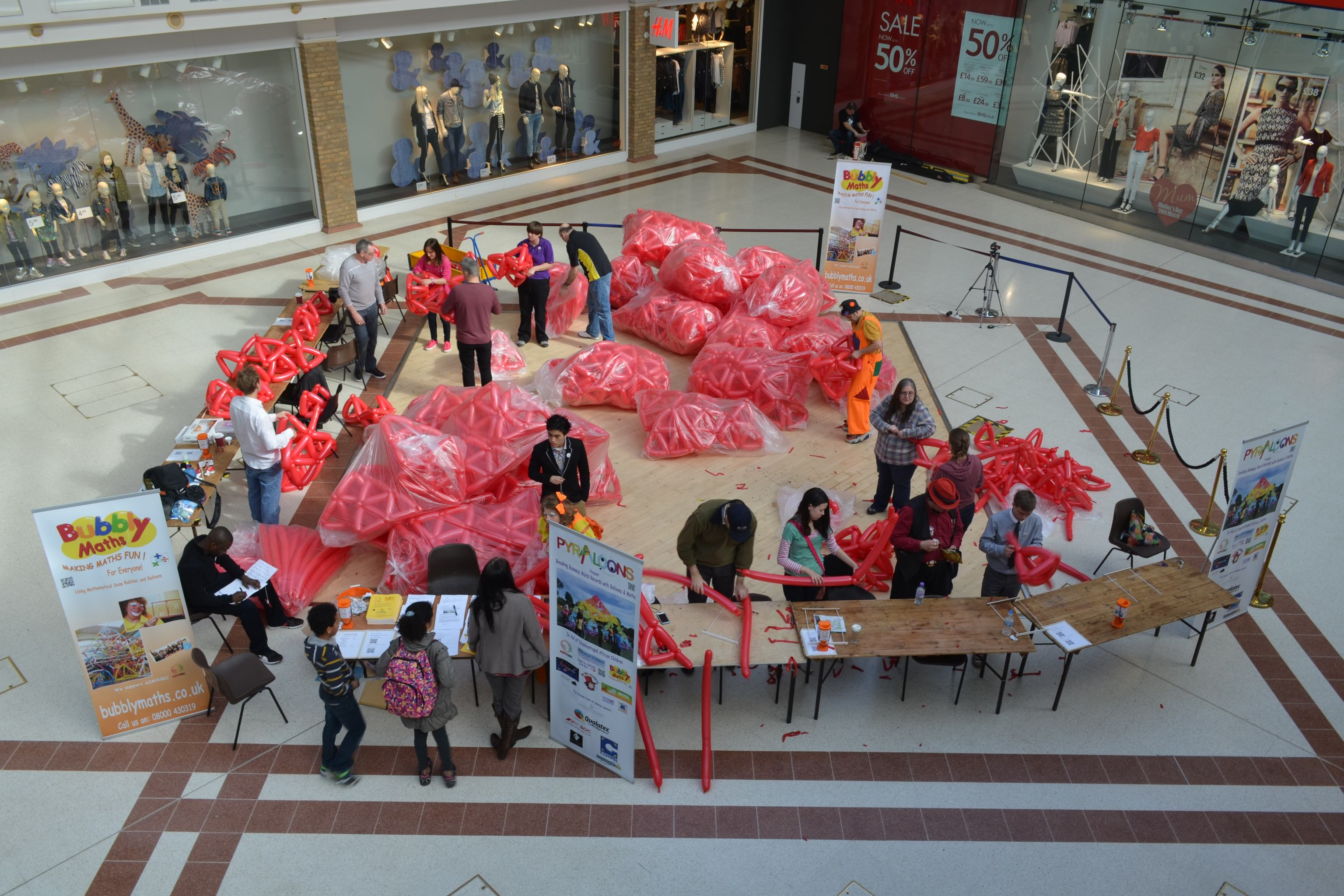
A hands-on activity at the 2014 festival.

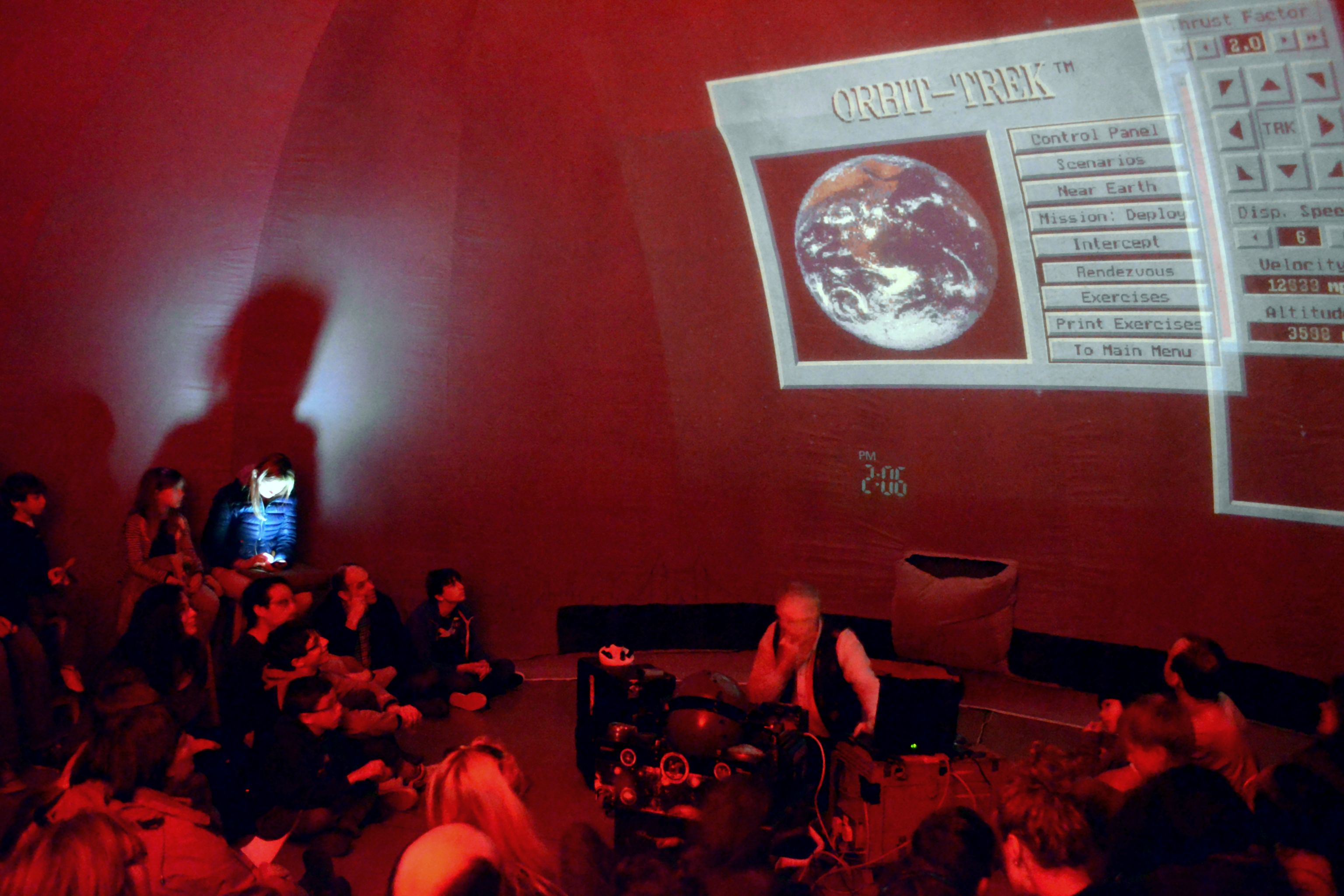
A planetarium show at the 2014 festival.
