= Mark McGann =

English actor (born 1961)

- Born: Mark Anthony McGann; 12 July 1961 (age 65); Kensington, Liverpool, England
- Occupation: Actor
- Years active: 1981–present
- Spouse: Caroline Guinness
- Relatives: Joe McGann (brother); Paul McGann (brother); Stephen McGann (brother); Heidi Thomas (sister-in-law); Joseph McGann (nephew)

Mark Anthony McGann (born 12 July 1961) is an English actor.

== Early life ==
McGann attended the De La Salle Grammar School, Liverpool. His father, Joe, was a Royal Naval Commando, who landed on Gold Beach during D-Day and later worked as a metallurgist, who died in 1984, and his mother, Clare, was a teacher. His three brothers Paul, Stephen, and Joe (named after his father), are all actors. He also has a younger sister, named Clare after their mother.

== Career ==
=== Acting ===
McGann's first breakthrough role was as the eponymous hero in the company's production of Lennon in 1981, which received good reviews and ran for 10 months at the London Astoria Theatre, winning McGann the first of his two Olivier Award nominations for best actor in a West End theatre production. He was later to reprise the role for the film John and Yoko: A Love Story for NBC television in the United States in 1985.

His first television appearances were in 1982 in Recording Studio opposite Peter Howitt and Robert Stephens for Granada TV, and Moving On The Edge, a BBC Play for Today TV drama starring Eleanor Bron. He then appeared as Mad Dog in the Channel 4 TV series Scully by Alan Bleasdale in 1983 with Cathy Tyson and Elvis Costello. It was the first of three separate collaborations with Bleasdale, which included the films No Surrender in 1985 and Pleasure for Channel 4 in 1990. He played Verezzi in the 1986 Channel 4 TV miniseries Zastrozzi, A Romance co-starring Tilda Swinton as Julia in an adaptation of the 1810 Gothic novel Zastrozzi by Percy Bysshe Shelley.

McGann's career in TV has seen him play Marcus Bannerman in the World War I era drama series by Russell T. Davies, The Grand, in 1999 for Granada TV; Joseph Bazalgette, the Victorian industrial engineer in the award-winning factual drama-documentary Seven Great Industrial Wonders of the World in 2002 for the BBC; Tom Crean, the Irish companion of Ernest Shackleton in Shackleton opposite Kenneth Branagh; and Niven Craig in Peter Medak's Let Him Have It with Christopher Eccleston and Tom Courtenay. He appeared as Conor Phelan in the multi-BAFTA nominated The Hanging Gale, a BBC drama set against the backdrop of the Great Famine, which also starred Mark's three actor brothers.

McGann has appeared in theatre productions as Mickey in Blood Brothers by Willy Russell in 1984, An Inspector Calls by J. B. Priestley for a National Theatre tour, in which he played Inspector Goole, and at the National Theatre in On the Ledge.

=== Writing and directing ===
Original works for stage and screen include:

- Perplexed Music - Short film written and directed by McGann and winner of the LA Shorts Platinum Award for Best Short Film, Newcastle International Film Festival Award for Best Short Film, Beverley Hills Film Festival Best Short, Red Corner (Sweden) Film Festival Best Short (33 film festival awards in total)
- Two of Us - the Lennon & McCartney Songbook for the Royal Liverpool Philharmonic Orchestra, co-written with Bob Eaton and directed by McGann for the RTE Orchestra Dublin, Royal Liverpool Philharmonic Orchestra Liverpool, The Northern Sinfonia Newcastle, the Bournemouth Symphony Orchestra and the Sibelius Orchestra Lahti, Finland
- Imagine Lennon for the Stadsteatern Gothenburg, Sweden, co-written with Bob Eaton
- Backstories, written and directed by McGann for the Merton Music Foundation and performed at the Royal Albert Hall in 2015
- The Sunderland Saga, an educational commission written and directed by McGann for Sunderland City Council in 2011
- The Legend of Spottee's Cave - a film project commissioned by Sunderland City Council and produced and directed by McGann in 2011 which received a UK Arts and Culture Award nomination for best educational film
- The Could Lad of Hylton Castle was directed by McGann and written by Colin Swash.

=== 2007–present ===
Since 2007, McGann has been the director of Drama Direct Ltd, a creative production company producing original productions and projects for the entertainment and education industries.

In 2017, McGann launched a successful Kickstarter campaign to fund his short film Perplexed Music, based on the Elizabeth Barrett Browning Petrarchan sonnet of the same name. McGann's film is written and directed and stars his brother Paul and nephew Jake "Sonny" McGann in leading roles. The film was released in 2018.

== Personal life ==
He lives with his wife, Caroline Guinness, in Frome, Somerset.

His great-uncle James "Jimmy" McGann was a trimmer on board the Titanic and survived the sinking aboard Collapsible Boat B.

== See also ==
- 1985 Laurence Olivier Awards
- 1987 Laurence Olivier Awards
