= Princess Catherine =

Princess Catherine may refer to:

== People ==
- Princess Catherine of Sweden (disambiguation), various princesses

=== Eastern European ===
- Catherine of Bosnia (princess) (b. 1453), only daughter of Thomas, King of Bosnia
- Catherine of Brandenburg (1602–1649; r. 1629–1630), Princess of Transylvania
- Catherine Radziwill (1858–1941), Polish princess by marriage to Prince Wilhelm Radziwiłł
- Catherine Caradja (1893–1993), Romanian noble princess and daughter of Prince Radu Creţulescu

==== Russian ====
- Catherine Bagration (1783–1857), Russian princess by marriage to Prince Pyotr Bagration
- Catherine Dolgorukova (1847–1922), Princess Yurievskaya by morganatic marriage to Alexander II, Emperor of Russia
- Catherine Yurievskaya (1878–1959), Russian princess and youngest child of Alexander II, Emperor of Russia
- Princess Catherine Ivanovna of Russia (1915–2007), great-great-granddaughter of Nicholas I, Emperor of Russia

=== Western European ===
- Catherine, Princess of Asturias (1422–1424), heiress presumptive of John II, King of Castile
- Catherine de Lorraine (1551–1596), French princess and only daughter of Francis, Duke of Guise

==== English ====
- Catherine of York (1479–1527), English princess and sixth daughter of Edward IV, King of England
- Catherine of Aragon (1485–1536), Princess of Wales by marriage to Arthur, Prince of Wales
- Catherine, Princess of Wales (born 1982), wife of William, Prince of Wales

==== German ====
- Catherine Pavlovna of Russia (1788–1819), Princess of Württemberg by marriage to William I, King of Württemberg
- Princess Catherine of Württemberg (1821–1898), third daughter of William I, King of Württemberg

=== Other people ===
- Catherine Duleep Singh (1871–1942), Princess and second daughter of Duleep Singh, Maharaja of the Sikh Empire

== See also ==
- Catarina of Portugal, Duchess of Braganza (1540–1614), Portuguese infanta and claimant to Portuguese throne
- Catherine (disambiguation)
- Empress Catherine (disambiguation)
- Infanta Catherine, Duchess of Villena (1403–1439), youngest daughter of Henry III, King of Castile
- Katharine, Duchess of Kent (1933–2025), wife of Prince Edward, Duke of Kent, and British princess by marriage
- Katherine of England (1253–1257), youngest child of Henry III, King of England
- Katherine Tudor (1503), youngest child of Henry VII, King of England
- List of people with given name Katherine
- Princess Catherine Beatrice of Savoy (1636–1637), youngest child of Victor Amadeus I, Duke of Savoy
- Queen Catherine (disambiguation)
- Yekaterina Vorontsova-Dashkova (1743–1810), Russian princess by marriage to Prince Mikhail Ivanovich Dashkov
