= Paul McGann =

English actor (born 1959)

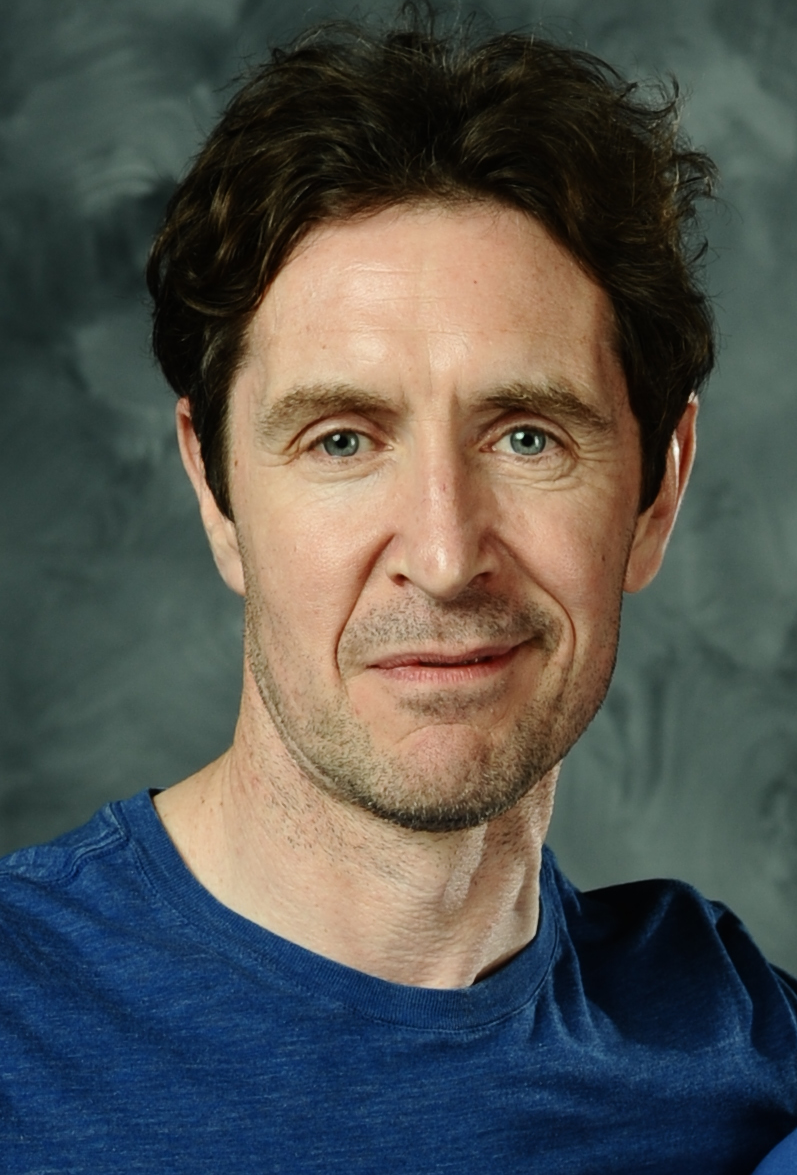
- McGann in 2015
- Born: 14 November 1959 (age 67); Kensington, Liverpool, England
- Education: Royal Academy of Dramatic Art (RADA)
- Occupation: Actor
- Years active: 1982–present
- Spouse: Annie Milner (m. 1996; sep. 2006)
- Children: Joseph McGann; Jake McGann
- Relatives: Joe McGann (brother); Mark McGann (brother); Stephen McGann (brother); Heidi Thomas (sister-in-law)

Paul John McGann (/məˈɡæn/ mə-GAN; born 14 November 1959) is an English actor. He is known for starring in the 1987 black comedy film Withnail and I, and for portraying the eighth incarnation of the Doctor in the 1996 television film Doctor Who; he reprised the role from 2001 in licensed audio dramas, as well as on screen in 2013 and 2022.

After a significant role in the BBC series Give Us a Break (1983–1984), McGann came to prominence for portraying Percy Toplis in the television serial The Monocled Mutineer (1986). He later played Lieutenant William Bush in the television film series Hornblower (1998–2003). His other television credits include The Hanging Gale (1995) and Luther (2010–2019), while his film work includes The Rainbow (1989), Alien 3 (1992) and Queen of the Damned (2002).

== Early life and education ==
Paul John McGann was born in Kensington, Liverpool on 14 November 1959, into a working-class Catholic family. His father Joe McGann, who took part in the Normandy landings as a British soldier, was a metallurgist, and his mother Clare (née Clara Green) was a nursery teacher; they briefly divorced in the 1970s but reconciled. McGann has an older brother, Joe, and three younger siblings: brothers Mark and Stephen and sister Clare. All four McGann brothers are actors. His cousin, Ritchie Routledge, was in the Merseybeat band The Cryin' Shames.

McGann's ancestors immigrated from Ireland in the 19th century due to the Great Famine. His great-grandfather Eugene was born in Tibohine, County Roscommon. McGann's great-uncle James McGann was a coal trimmer on board the Titanic when she sank on 15 April 1912; he survived on board Collapsible Boat B and died in 1918.

Paul McGann attended Cardinal Allen Grammar School, an all-boys Catholic school in Liverpool. He trained to become a track and field athlete and at the age of sixteen he "dreamt about going to the Olympics". McGann discovered a love of acting after being persuaded to perform in the Tom Stoppard play The Real Inspector Hound. He decided to pursue an acting career after watching Ian McKellen and Judi Dench in a Stratford production of Macbeth.

After school, McGann moved to London where he worked in a shoe shop. On a visit back to Liverpool, his school's deputy head encouraged him to audition for the Royal Academy of Dramatic Art. McGann auditioned with readings from Richard III and My Fair Lady, and successfully won his grant place. In 1980, a scene from a Macbeth adaptation co-written by McGann and Bruce Payne was selected by RADA Principal Hugh Cruttwell to be performed before Queen Elizabeth II during one of her rare visits to the academy. He graduated in 1981, having won the school’s Vanbrugh Award.

== Career ==
=== Early work and breakthrough ===
McGann's early acting work included two productions at the Haymarket Theatre, Basingstoke: he appeared in Much Ado About Nothing from March to May 1981, and played musician George Harrison in John, Paul, George, Ringo ... and Bert from May to June 1981. The same year, he performed in productions of Piaf, Godspell and Cain at Nottingham Playhouse. McGann and his three brothers appeared in the stage musical Yakety Yak (1982–1983), which brought press attention. The musical later transferred to the Astoria in the West End. In September 1983, the brothers released the single "Shame About the Boy" as The McGanns. McGann later appeared in a 1983 production of The Genius at Royal Court, and a 1984 production of Loot at Ambassador's in London.

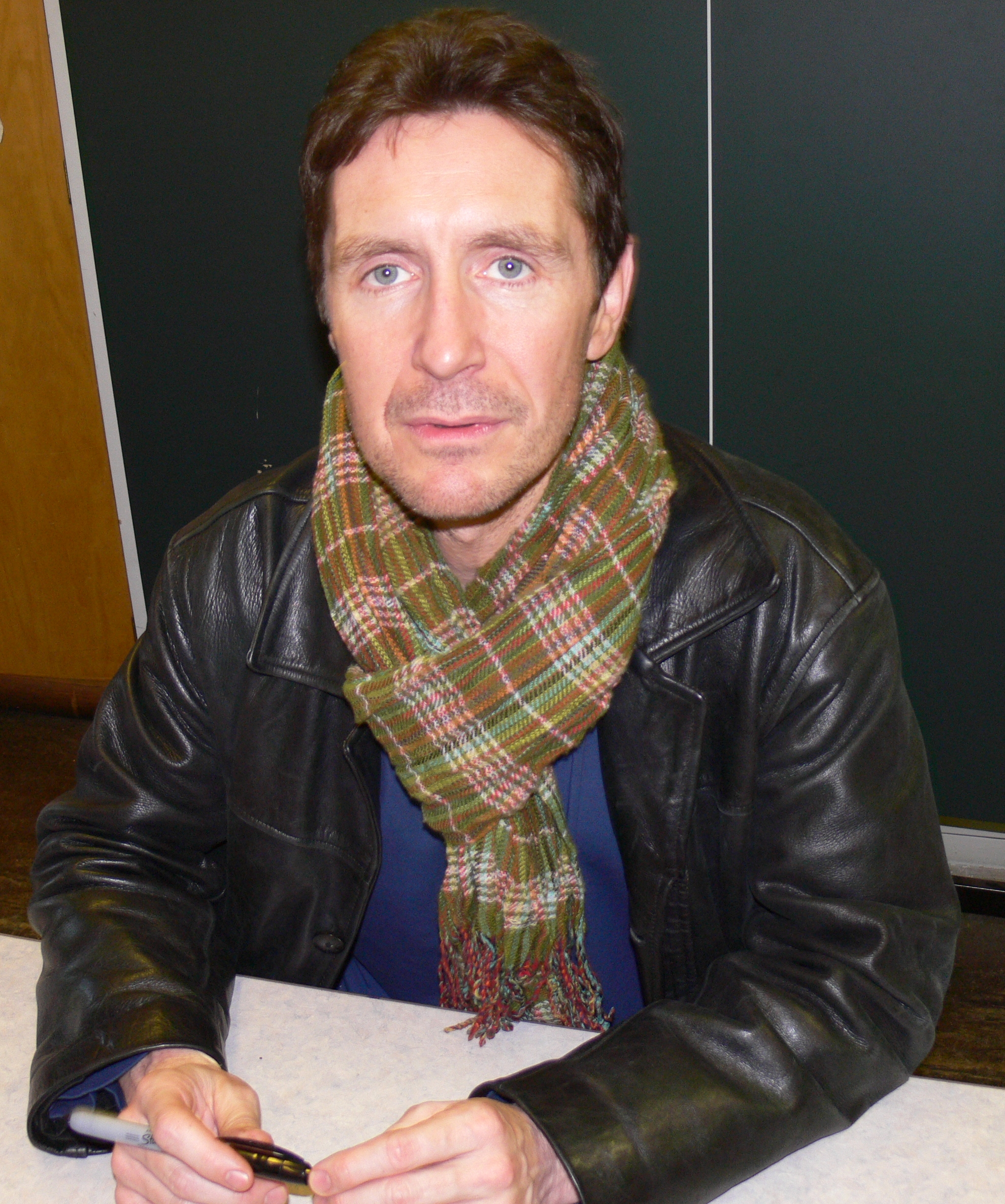
McGann in 2007

McGann made his television debut in the Play for Today episode "Whistling Wally", broadcast 6 April 1982. His breakthrough role was in the BBC television series Give Us a Break (1983–1984), in which he starred as a snooker player named Mo Morris. He later presented the winning trophy for the 1984 Pot Black snooker competition. McGann gained wider recognition for playing the lead character of Percy Toplis, a British criminal and deserter during World War I, in Alan Bleasdale's BBC historical serial The Monocled Mutineer (1986), based on the 1978 book of the same name written by William Alison and John Fairley. The serial garnered controversy from British right-wing media over its depiction of the 1917 Étaples mutiny, though McGann's performance garnered acclaim.

McGann and Richard E. Grant star in Bruce Robinson's 1987 black comedy film Withnail and I as unemployed flatmates who take a disastrous countryside holiday. McGann's unnamed character, credited as "...& I" has been referred to as "Marwood" by Robinson and critics. The film is considered a cult classic of British cinema.

McGann subsequently starred primarily in television dramas. He portrayed the title character in Cariani and the Courtesans (1987) and appeared in Drowning in the Shallow End (1990), both BBC Two dramas. He played John Worthing in a 1988 television adaptation of The Importance of Being Earnest. He also appeared in the psychological drama film Tree of Hands (1989). McGann starred as Anton Skrebensky in Ken Russell's 1989 film adaptation of D. H. Lawrence's 1915 novel The Rainbow. His other early film appearances include The Monk, Dealers and the epic war film Empire of the Sun. McGann and other young British actors who were becoming established film actors such as Tim Roth, Gary Oldman, Colin Firth and Bruce Payne were dubbed the 'Brit Pack'.

Since 1989, McGann concentrated primarily on television work, including Nice Town and Nature Boy for the BBC, and The One That Got Away and the second series of Hornblower for ITV. However, he has had small roles in a number of high-profile American films like The Three Musketeers and Alien 3. His role in Alien 3 was originally larger, but much of it was edited out of the final print. The cut footage can be seen in the extended version of the film.

In 1992, he was cast as Richard Sharpe, the lead character in the Sharpe series of made-for-TV films based on Bernard Cornwell's novels. However, he injured his knee while playing football just days into filming Sharpe's Rifles in Ukraine and was replaced by Sean Bean in the role.

McGann and his brothers appeared in the 1995 television film Catherine the Great. They also played brothers in the 1995 television serial The Hanging Gale.

=== Doctor Who ===
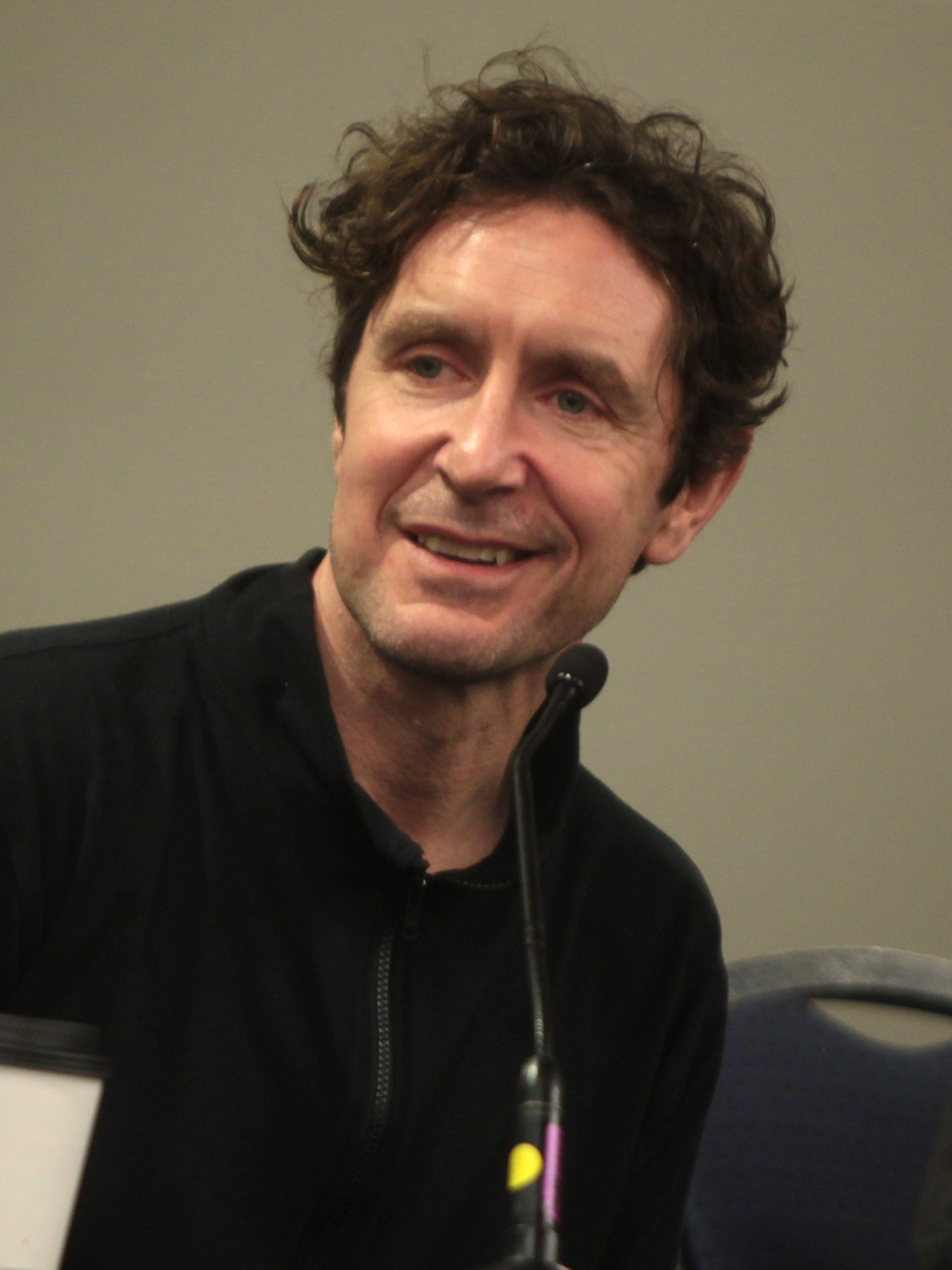
McGann at the 2014 Phoenix Comicon Fan Fest

In 1996, McGann played the eighth incarnation of The Doctor in the Doctor Who television film, which also starred Eric Roberts, Daphne Ashbrook and Sylvester McCoy as the outgoing Seventh Doctor. McGann's brother, Mark McGann, also auditioned for the title role. Paul McGann originally turned the part down, presuming that the producers wanted a comic actor, but was swayed by the enthusiasm of producer Philip Segal.

The Doctor Who television film was a joint venture between the BBC, Universal Studios and the Fox Broadcasting Network. McGann had signed a contract to appear as the Eighth Doctor in a new Doctor Who television series, if Fox or Universal exercised their option. Thus, the television film was supposed to be a "back door pilot" in that, if it obtained respectable ratings, the new series would continue to be produced. The film was shown on 14 May 1996 in the US and on 27 May 1996 in the UK. Although it had 9.08 million viewers and was very successful in the UK, ratings were very low in the United States. As a consequence, Fox did not exercise its option to pick up the series and Universal could not find another network interested in airing a new Doctor Who series. Thus no new series was produced until 2005, after all the contractual rights had returned to the BBC.

McGann gave permission for his likeness to be used on the covers of the BBC's Eighth Doctor novels and he has reprised the role of the Eighth Doctor 244 times (as of 2026) in an extensive series of audio plays by Big Finish Productions. A number of these plays have also been broadcast on BBC Radio 7 (later BBC Radio 4 Extra).

McGann continues to play the Eighth Doctor on audio. McGann's first Big Finish audio play appearance was in 2001 in the story Storm Warning. It was through the Big Finish audio plays that McGann's Doctor faced many classic Doctor Who villains like the Daleks (in various different audio plays, the first of which being The Time of the Daleks) and the Cybermen (first encountered by the Eighth Doctor on audio in Sword of Orion).

Five Eighth Doctor dramas were broadcast in BBC 7's The 7th Dimension slot between August 2005 and January 2006. They were in release order, starting with Storm Warning, although Minuet in Hell was judged unsuitable for the timeslot, and skipped. Two more Eighth Doctor audios, Shada and The Chimes of Midnight, were broadcast in December 2005 and January 2006. All six of these stories were rebroadcast on BBC7 beginning in July 2006. In 2007 and 2008, a series of audio plays starring McGann as the Eighth Doctor and Sheridan Smith as companion Lucie Miller was broadcast on BBC7.

After months of speculation, on 14 November 2013, which was coincidentally McGann's birthday, as part of the show's 50th Anniversary celebrations, McGann finally reprised his role as the Eighth Doctor, in the mini-episode "The Night of the Doctor". In this appearance, his incarnation of the Doctor regenerates, 17 years after his first television appearance, into the War Doctor played by John Hurt. Additionally, McGann briefly appeared as a fictionalised version of himself in the comedy short film The Five(ish) Doctors Reboot, produced to commemorate Doctor Who's 50th anniversary.

He made his first appearance on the main television series in a cameo in the 2022 special "The Power of the Doctor", alongside other past Doctors. He also featured in the documentary film Doctor Who Am I, supporting TV movie director Matthew Jacobs' embrace of the Doctor Who fandom and its conventions.

=== Later career ===
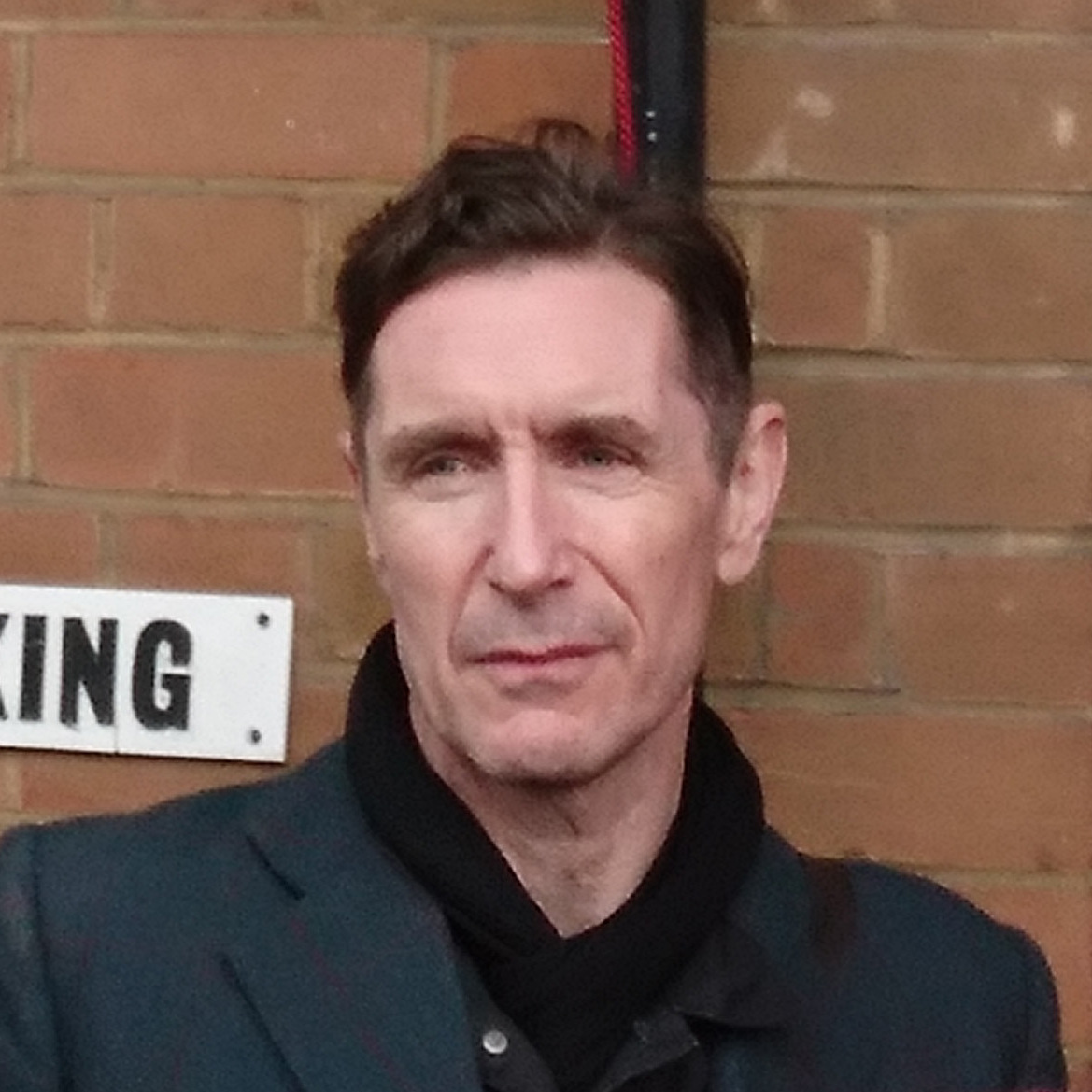
McGann in 2017

McGann is known for audiobook narration, having read several Pat Barker and Bernard Cornwell novels. He narrated the abridged audiobook of Jeff Noon's 1993 cyberpunk classic Vurt. After hearing him sing in The Monocled Mutineer, composer Bernard J. Taylor invited McGann to create the role of Benedict in the concept studio recording of the Much Ado, a musical based on Shakespeare's Much Ado About Nothing. His voice featured in the 1997 video game Ceremony of Innocence, together with those of Isabella Rossellini and Ben Kingsley. In 1997, he appeared as a concerned father in the film FairyTale: A True Story and later that same year as Rob in Downtime, then in 1998 he appeared as Capt. Greville in The Dance of Shiva. In the 2000s McGann's film appearances began to increase with films like My Kingdom (2001), Listening (2003) and Gypo (2005). Perhaps his most iconic role since Doctor Who came in 2002, when McGann appeared in the film adaptation of the third story from Anne Rice's The Vampire Chronicles, Queen of the Damned. McGann played the part of David Talbot, a member of the secret organisation the Talamasca, which researches and investigates the supernatural. Talbot has appeared in many of Rice's novels and has become a central character over the years. The film also starred Stuart Townsend, Marguerite Moreau and R&B singer Aaliyah. McGann has also been in demand for voice-over work in Britain in recent years, particularly on television documentaries and commercials.

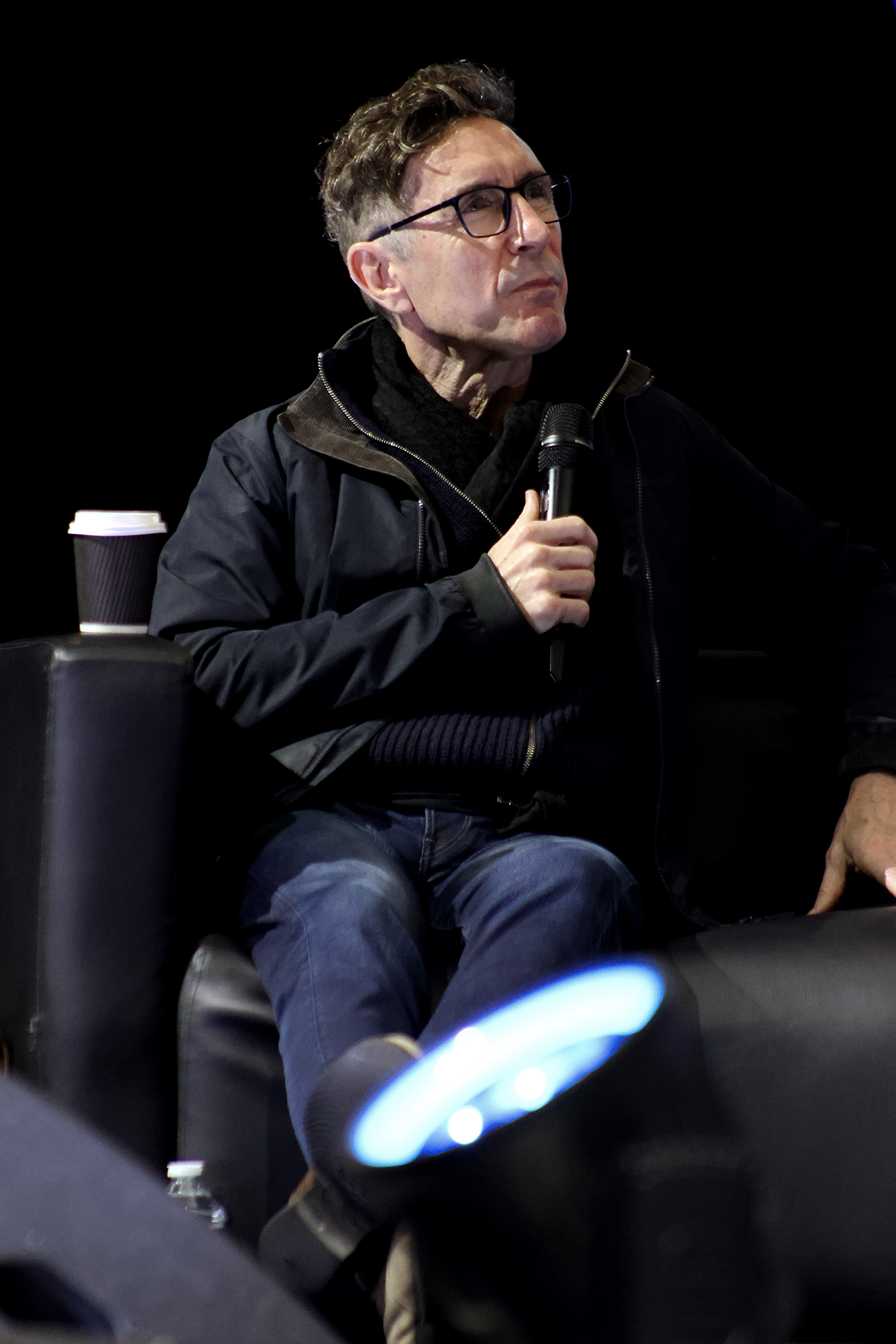
McGann at MCM Birmingham in 2025

He also gained acclaim for his portrayal of William Bush in the final four instalments of the ITV/A&E television series Hornblower, based on the Horatio Hornblower books by C.S. Forrester. He initially appears in the 2001 episode "Mutiny", with Bush being the 2nd Lieutenant of HMS Renown (and Hornblower's superior). In the 7th episode, "Loyalty", he agrees to join Hornblower as his 1st Lieutenant when Hornblower takes command of HMS Hotspur. McGann again portrays Bush in the 2003 finale of the series, "Duty".

In 2006, he appeared in the television drama Tripping Over. In 2007, McGann starred alongside Dervla Kirwan, Lorraine Ashbourne and David Bradley in BBC One drama True Dare Kiss, written by Debbie Horsfield. In 2010, McGann played a major role in a feature-length episode of long-running BBC mystery series Jonathan Creek, as well as appearing as a regular in the crime drama Luther. In 2011, McGann played a major role as an Assistant Commissioner with something to hide in the final episode of Waking the Dead and also featured in Simon Gray's Butley alongside Dominic West at the Duchess Theatre in London.

McGann portrayed Ambassador Durian in The Minister of Chance, a fantasy audio drama released in six parts from 2011 to 2013. The series is a spin-off of the Doctor Who audio drama Death Comes to Time, but has no official connection to the franchise. In February 2014, a crowdfunded short film based on the first instalment of The Minister of Chance was released to those who had helped fund it. McGann has done audio narration for BBC documentaries, including the 2014 BBC Scotland production, Apples, Pears and Paint: How to Make a Still Life Painting.

In 2017, McGann joined the cast of the long-running BBC series Holby City, playing neurosurgeon John Gaskell. McGann portrays antagonist Noah Shackleton in the audio drama adaptation of The Phoenix Files. The Australian production is the largest audio drama ever produced in Australia with a cast of 42 actors. McGann appears in all three instalments of the science-fiction dystopian thriller series.

Starting in 2021, he hosts the British Podcast Awards Gold-winning Noiser Podcast Network production Real Dictators, a history podcast that explores the lives, personalities, and regimes of authoritarian leaders.

McGann is chief narrator in the popular A short history of… podcast series, which explores various historical topics in easily accessible episodes.

== Personal life ==
In 1991 or 1996, McGann married Anne-Marie "Annie" Milner, an assistant stage manager at the Haymarket Theatre in Basingstoke. They separated in 2006. The couple had two sons, music producer Joseph (known as Kahn) and actor Jake. Jake portrayed the Doctor's great-grandson in Big Finish's Doctor Who audio dramas.

Between 2006 and 2008, McGann was in a relationship with actress Susannah Harker.

As of 2023, McGann lives in Bristol. He has been a Liverpool F.C. season ticket holder since 1987.

== Acting credits ==
=== Film ===
| Year | Title | Role | Notes | Ref. |
|---|---|---|---|---|
| 1987 | Withnail and I | ...& I (Marwood) | | |
| 1987 | Empire of the Sun | Lieutenant Price | | |
| 1989 | Tree of Hands | Barry | | |
| 1989 | Streets of Yesterday | Yosef Raz | | |
| 1989 | The Rainbow | Anton Skrebensky | | |
| 1989 | Dealers | Daniel Pascoe | | |
| 1990 | Paper Mask | Matthew Harris | | |
| 1990 | The Monk | Father Lorenzo Rojas | | |
| 1991 | Afraid of the Dark | Tony Dalton | | |
| 1992 | Alien 3 | Golic | | |
| 1993 | The Three Musketeers | Girard / Jussac | | |
| 1997 | FairyTale: A True Story | Arthur Wright | | |
| 1997 | Downtime | Rob | | |
| 1998 | The Dance of Shiva | Capt. Greville | Short film | |
| 2001 | My Kingdom | Dean | | |
| 2001 | Mother Me Daughter | Dr. O'Shea | Short film | |
| 2002 | Queen of the Damned | David Talbot | | |
| 2003 | Listening | The Man | Short film | |
| 2003 | Y Mabinogi | King Matholwch (voice) | AKA Otherworld | |
| 2005 | Gypo | Paul | | |
| 2006 | Poppies | Tony Hudson | | |
| 2007 | Always Crashing in the Same Car | Bill Mackinnon | Short film | |
| 2007 | Voice from Afar | Actor 4 | | |
| 2009 | Lesbian Vampire Killers | Vicar | | |
| 2010 | Godard & Others | Torrence | | |
| 2011 | Moving Target | Mr. Johnson | | |
| 2012 | Notes from the Underground | Photographer | | |
| 2013 | Art Is... | Lulu's Dad | | |
| 2013 | A Little Place Off the Edgware Road | James Craven | Short film | |
| 2014 | The Minister of Chance | Ambassador Durian | Short film | |
| 2015 | Absence | Man | Short film | |
| 2016 | The Pit and the Pendulum: A Study in Torture | Christian Judge | Short film | |
| 2016 | Tale of a Timelord | The Doctor | Short film | |
| 2016 | Brakes | Peter | | |
| 2016 | Letters from Baghdad | Henry Cadogan (voice) | | |
| 2017 | B&B | Josh | | |
| 2017 | Perplexed Music | Man | Short film | |
| 2021 | Swallow Your Dreams | James | Short film | |
| 2023 | The Day of the Sun Dog | Jaggers | Short film | |
| 2023 | The Undertaker | Arthur Morel | | |
| 2025 | Good Behaviour | Richard | Short film | |
| 2026 | Triesverse: Cataclysm | The Doctor | Short film | |

=== Television ===
| Year | Title | Role | Notes |
|---|---|---|---|
| 1982 | Play for Today | Norman | Episode: "Whistling Wally" |
| 1982 | Russian Night... 1941 | Dygin | Television film |
| 1982 | Panorama | Jamrozek | Episode: "Two Weeks in Winter: How the Army Took Over Poland" |
| 1983 | Gaskin | Graham Gaskin | Television film |
| 1983–1984 | Give Us a Break | Mo Morris | 8 episodes |
| 1986 | The Importance of Being Earnest | John Worthing | Television film |
| 1986 | The Monocled Mutineer | Percy Toplis | 4 episodes |
| 1990 | Screen Two | Colin | Episode: "Drowning in the Shallow End" |
| 1992 | Nice Town | Joe Thompson | 3 episodes |
| 1995 | Catherine the Great | Grigory Potemkin | Television film |
| 1995 | The Hanging Gale | Liam Phelan | 4 episodes |
| 1996 | The One That Got Away | Chris Ryan | Television film |
| 1996 | Doctor Who | The Doctor | Television film |
| 1996 | Testament: The Bible in Animation | David (voice) | Episode: "David and Saul" |
| 1996 | The Merchant of Venice | Bassanio | Television film |
| 1998 | Our Mutual Friend | Eugene Wrayburn | 4 episodes |
| 1999 | Forgotten | Ben Turner | Mini-series; 3 episodes |
| 1999 | Breathless Hush | Henry Newbolt | Television film |
| 2000 | Nature Boy | Steve Witton | 4 episodes |
| 2000 | Fish | Jonathan Vishnevski | 6 episodes |
| 2001 | Hotel! | Ben Carter | Television film |
| 2001 | Sweet Revenge | Patrick Vine | 2 episodes |
| 2001, 2003 | Hornblower | Lieutenant Bush | 4 episodes |
| 2002 | Blood Strangers | DC David Ingram | 2 episodes |
| 2002 | The Biographer | Andrew Morton | Television film |
| 2003 | Agatha Christie's Poirot | Dr. Peter Lord | Episode: "Sad Cypress" |
| 2004 | Lie with Me | Gerry Henson | 2-part crime drama |
| 2005 | Kidnapped | Colonel MacNab | Television film |
| 2006 | Agatha Christie's Marple | Dickie Erskine | Episode: "Sleeping Murder" |
| 2006 | Sea of Souls | Christopher Chambers | Episode: "Rebound" |
| 2006 | If I Had You | Philip Andrews | Television film |
| 2006 | Tripping Over | Jeremy | Mini-series; 6 episodes |
| 2007 | True Dare Kiss | Nash McKinnon | 6 episodes |
| 2008 | Fables of Forgotten Things | Clarence | Television short film. Pilot for future series |
| 2009 | Collision | Richard Reeves | 5 episodes |
| 2010 | Jonathan Creek | Hugo Doré | Episode: "The Judas Tree" |
| 2010–2011, 2019 | Luther | Mark North | 10 episodes |
| 2011 | Waking the Dead | ACC Tony Nicholson | Episodes: "Waterloo", Parts 1 & 2 |
| 2011 | New Tricks | DCI James Larson | Episode: "Object of Desire" |
| 2012 | Save Our Souls: The Titanic Inquiry | Sir Rufus Isaacs | Television film |
| 2012 | A Mother's Son | David | Mini-series; 2 episodes |
| 2013 | Ripper Street | Stanley J. Bone | Episode: "The Good of This City" |
| 2013 | Moving On | Phil | Episode: "Blood Ties" |
| 2013 | The Five(ish) Doctors Reboot | Himself | Television film |
| 2013, 2022 | Doctor Who | Eighth Doctor | Episodes: "The Night of the Doctor" (minisode) & "The Power of the Doctor" (cameo) |
| 2014 | The Bletchley Circle | John Richards | Episode: "Blood on Their Hands: Part 1" |
| 2016 | Moving On | None | Director on 2 episodes "Passengers" & "Zero" |
| 2016 | The Musketeers | St. Pierre | Episode: "The Queen's Diamonds" |
| 2017–2018 | Holby City | John Gaskell | 40 episodes |
| 2021, 2023 | Annika | Dr. Jake Strathearn | 6 episodes |
| 2022 | Anne | Sir Malcolm Thornton | Episode: #1.2 |
| 2022 | McDonald & Dodds | Archie Addington | Episode: "A Billion Beats" |
| 2025 | Bookish | Mr. Kind | 2 episodes |

=== Stage ===
| Year | Title | Role | Notes |
|---|---|---|---|
| 1984–1985 | Loot | Dennis | Ambassadors Theatre and Lyric Theatre |
| 1987 | A Lie of the Mind | Frankie | Royal Court Theatre |
| 1995 | Father and Son: Son and Father | Performer | New Vic, Bristol |
| 1996 | Much Ado About Nothing | Dogberry | Horseshoe, Basingstoke |
| 1997 | Loot | Dennis | Ambassadors |
| 1998 | The Seagull | Constantine | Royal Court Theatre |
| 1999 | A Lie of the Mind | Frankie | Royal Court Theatre |
| 2003 | The Little Black Book | Jean-Jaques | Riverside Studios |
| 2003–2004 | Mourning Becomes Electra | Captain Adam Brant | National Theatre |
| 2005 | The Gigli Concert | Jimmy | Finborough Theatre |
| 2009 | Helen | Menelaus | Shakespeare's Globe |
| 2011 | Butley | Reg | Duchess Theatre |
| 2013 | Major Barbara | Undershaft | Abbey Theatre |
| 2014 | Three Sisters | Alexander Vershinin | Southwark Playhouse |
| 2017 | Gabriel | Von Pfunz | Theatre 6 |
| 2022 | The Forest | Man 2 | Hampstead Theatre |
| 2024 | The River | The Man | Greenwich Theatre |

=== Narration ===
| Year | Title | Notes |
|---|---|---|
| 1995 | Equinox | Series 10; episode 6: "High Anxiety" |
| 2004 | That'll Teach 'Em | Series 2 (5 episodes) |
| 2005 | Zero Hour | Series 2 |
| 2005 | Ghosts on the Underground | |
| 2006–2007 | Real Crime | Series 5–6 |
| 2011 | Britain's Greatest Codebreaker | |
| 2012 | 9/11: The Miracle Survivor | Television film |
| 2013 | Wildest Latin America | 5 episodes |
| 2013 | Extraordinary People: The Boy with the Incredible Brain | |
| 2014 | Apples, Pears and Paint: How to Make a Still Life Painting | |
| 2014 | France: The Wild Side | |
| 2014 | Cosmonauts: How Russia Won the Space Race | |
| 2015 | Churchill: Winning the War, Losing the Peace | Television film |
| 2015 | Shark | |
| 2015 | Hunt for the Arctic Ghost Ship | |
| 2016 | Churchill's Secret | Television film |
| 2016 | Wild Sri Lanka | Disney+ |
| 2016 | Wildest Islands of Indonesia | |
| 2016–2017 | Eden | Series 1–2 |
| 2020 | A Pilgrim's Tale | Record album by Seth Lakeman |
| 2020–2025 | Real Dictators | Podcast |
| 2021 | Greta Thunberg: A Year to Change the World | |
| 2021–2022 | Short History Of... | Podcast; Series 1–2 (41 episodes) |
| 2024 | D-Day: The Tide Turns | Podcast |
| 2025 | Ancient Civilizations | Podcast; co-narrator John Hopkins |
| 2025 | Titanic: Ship of Dreams | Podcast; 13 episodes |
| TBA | Unexplained Island | Series 1. Completed |

=== Audio ===
| Year | Title | Role | Notes |
|---|---|---|---|
| 2001–2021 | Doctor Who: The Monthly Adventures | Eighth Doctor | 36 episodes |
| 2003–present | Doctor Who: The Eighth Doctor Adventures | Eighth Doctor | 152 episodes |
| 2011–2013 | The Minister of Chance | Durian | 6 episodes |
| 2015 | River Song | Eighth Doctor | Episode: "The Rulers of the Universe" |
| 2019 | You're the Boss | Bill | Track 5 on "Shuffle" by Jamie Lenman, reading of a scene from "Always Crashing in the Same Car" (2007) |
| 2019–2020 | The War Master | Eighth Doctor | Series 3 & 5 (4 episodes) |
| 2020 | Susan's War | Eighth Doctor | Episode: "The Shoreditch Intervention" |
| 2023 | The Robots | Eighth Doctor | Episode: "The Final Hour" |
| 2023 | The Paternoster Gang | Eighth Doctor | Episode: "Till Death Us Do Part" |

=== Video games ===
| Year | Title | Role | Notes |
|---|---|---|---|
| 1997 | Ceremony of Innocence | Griffin Moss (voice) | |
| 2015 | Anno 2205 | Virgil Drake (voice) | English version |
| 2015 | Lego Dimensions | Eighth Doctor (voice) | Archive audio |
| 2023 | Mia and the Dragon Princess | Walsh (voice) | |

=== Web ===
| Year | Title | Role | Notes |
|---|---|---|---|
| 2020 | The Doctors Say Thank You | Himself | |

== Awards and nominations ==
| Year | Award | Category | Work | Result | Ref. |
|---|---|---|---|---|---|
| 1987 | British Academy Television Awards | Best Actor | The Monocled Mutineer | Nominated | |
| 1990 | Barcelona Cinema Festival | Best Actor | Paper Mask | Won | |
| 1996 | Saturn Awards | Best Actor on Television | Doctor Who | Nominated | |
| 2006 | Torino Gay & Lesbian Film Festival | Special Mention (shared with the cast) | Gypo | Won | |
| 2013 | Crime Thriller Awards | Best Supporting Actor | A Mother's Son | Nominated | |
| 2017 | Horrible Imaginings Film Festival | Best Actor in a Feature Film | B&B | Won | |
| 2018 | Global Independent Film Awards | Best Ensemble Cast (shared with the cast) | B&B | Won | |
| 2021 | Liverpool Film Festival | Best Actor | Swallow Your Dreams | Won | |
