= Alex Thomson (cinematographer) =

British cinematographer (1929–2007)

- Born: 12 January 1929; London, England
- Died: 14 June 2007 (aged 78); Chertsey, Surrey, England
- Occupation: Cinematographer
- Years active: 1947–2004
- Spouse: Diana Thomson
- Children: 1

President of the British Society of Cinematographers
- In office 1980–1982
- Preceded by: Bob Huke
- Succeeded by: Tony Imi

Alexander Thomson BSC (12 January 1929 – 14 June 2007) was an English cinematographer and former president of the British Society of Cinematographers.

He was nominated for an Academy Award for Best Cinematography for his work on John Boorman's Excalibur (1981).

The BSC posthumously described him as "a cinematographer's cinematographer."

== Early life ==
Thomson was born and raised in the Kingsbury district of London. His father was a tailor, whose clients included Anthony Havelock-Allan.

== Career ==
As a teenager, Thomson was offered a job by Bert Easey, who was head of cameras at Denham and Pinewood Studios. He entered the film industry as a clapper boy.

After that, he went on to serve as a camera operator under cinematographer Nicolas Roeg throughout the 60s, until he made his debut as a cinematographer with the film Ervinka (1967).

Thomson was the original director of photography for Jesus Christ Superstar (1973), but during the first week of principal photography, he was seriously injured after falling from a camera crane. Cinematographer Douglas Slocombe was then brought up as replacement.

During his recovery, Thomson worked as second unit for Oswald Morris on The Man Who Would Be King (1975) and The Seven-Per-Cent Solution (1976), and additional photography on Superman (1978).

In 1980, Thomson was brought in to shoot John Boorman's Excalibur, replacing Tony Pierce-Roberts. Thomson's work on the Arthurian fantasy epic subsequently earned him a nomination for Academy Award for Best Cinematography.

From 1980 to 1982, Thomson served as the 16th President of the British Society of Cinematographers.

== Style and techniques ==
Thomson was an avid user of Joe Dunton's custom-built Xtal Xpress anamorphic lenses, shooting many of his more high-profile projects with them.

== Personal life and death ==
He was married to the sculptor Diana Thomson, and they had a daughter, Chyna.

Thomson died on 14 June 2007, at the age of 78, in Chertsey, Surrey.

He is featured in the book Conversations with Cinematographers by David A. Ellis, published by Scarecrow Press.

== Filmography ==
Film

Year	Title	Director
1967	Ervinka	Ephraim Kishon
1968	Here We Go Round the Mulberry Bush	Clive Donner
1968	The Strange Affair	David Greene
1969	The Best House in London	Philip Saville
1969	Alfred the Great	Clive Donner
1969	I Start Counting	David Greene
1970	The Rise and Rise of Michael Rimmer	Kevin Billington
1971	The Night Digger	Alastair Reid
1972	Dr. Phibes Rises Again	Robert Fuest
1972	Death Line	Gary Sherman
1972	Fear Is the Key	Michael Tuchner
1978	Rosie Dixon – Night Nurse	Justin Cartwright
1978	The Cat and the Canary	Radley Metzger
1978	The Class of Miss MacMichael	Silvio Narizzano
1979	Game for Vultures	James Fargo
1979	Follow That Rainbow	Louis Burke
1981	Excalibur	John Boorman
1983	Eureka	Nicolas Roeg
1983	Bullshot	Dick Clement
1983	The Keep	Michael Mann
1984	Electric Dreams	Steve Barron
1985	Year of the Dragon	Michael Cimino
1985	Legend	Ridley Scott
1986	Raw Deal	John Irvin
1986	Labyrinth	Jim Henson
1986	Duet for One	Andrei Konchalovsky
1987	The Sicilian	Michael Cimino
1987	Date with an Angel	Tom McLoughlin
1988	Track 29	Nicolas Roeg
1988	High Spirits	Neil Jordan
1989	Leviathan	George P. Cosmatos
1989	The Rachel Papers	Damian Harris
1990	Wings of Fame	Otakar Votocek
1990	The Krays	Peter Medak
1990	Mr. Destiny	James Orr
1992	Alien 3	David Fincher
1993	Cliffhanger	Renny Harlin
1993	Demolition Man	Marco Brambilla
1994	Black Beauty	Caroline Thompson
1995	The Scarlet Letter	Roland Joffé
1996	Executive Decision	Stuart Baird
1996	Hamlet	Kenneth Branagh
2000	Love's Labour's Lost	Kenneth Branagh
2000	A Shot at Glory	Michael Corrente

Short film

Year	Title	Director
1972	LHR	Mike Fox
1981	The Last of Linda Cleer	Bob Mahoney
1998	The Man Who Couldn't Open Doors	Paul Arden
1999	The Troop	Marcus Dillistone
2003	Listening	Kenneth Branagh
2004	Der letzte Flug	Roger Moench

TV movies

Year	Title	Director
1973	The Going Up of David Lev	James F. Collier
1981	Skokie	Herbert Wise

TV series

Year	Title	Director	Episode
1980	ABC Weekend Special	Robert Fuest	"The Gold Bug"

== Awards and nominations ==
Year	Award	Category	Title	Result
1981	Academy Awards	Best Cinematography	Excalibur	Nominated
1981	British Society of Cinematographers	Best Cinematography	Excalibur	Nominated
1983	British Society of Cinematographers	Best Cinematography	Eureka	Nominated
1985	British Society of Cinematographers	Best Cinematography	Legend	Won
1996	British Society of Cinematographers	Best Cinematography	Hamlet	Won
2002	British Society of Cinematographers	Lifetime Achievement Award	—N/a	Won
1996	Camerimage	Golden Frog	Hamlet	Nominated
1980	Daytime Emmy Awards	Outstanding Achievement in Children's Programming	ABC Weekend Special ("The Gold Bug")	Won
1996	Satellite Awards	Best Cinematography	Hamlet	Nominated
