= Mrs Caldicot's Cabbage War =

2002 British comedy-drama film

- Original cinema poster
- Directed by: Ian Sharp
- Screenplay by: Malcolm Stone
- Based on: Mrs Caldicot's Cabbage War
- Produced by: Andy Birmingham
- Starring: Pauline Collins; John Alderton; Peter Capaldi
- Cinematography: Sue Gibson
- Edited by: Gerry Hambling
- Music by: Alan Lisk
- Production company: Evolution Films Ltd
- Distributed by: Arrow Film Distributors
- Release dates: 5 June 2002 (IFE); 25 June 2002 (MIFF); 31 January 2003 (UK & IRL)
- Running time: 107 minutes
- Country: United Kingdom
- Language: English

Mrs Caldicot's Cabbage War is a 2002 British comedy-drama film, directed by Ian Sharp and starring Pauline Collins, John Alderton and Peter Capaldi. It is based on a 1993 novel with the same name by author and conspiracy theorist Vernon Coleman.

It is the story about a woman, Thelma Caldicot, who is coerced by her manipulative son Derek and daughter-in-law to move into a run-down nursing home, owned by Derek's employer, after the death of her bullying husband. Derek also gets her to sign over her house to him. However, she doesn't like it at the nursing home and shows her frustration. After having been medicated by the staff to stay calm, she finally incites her fellow inmates to revolt.

The film premiered in June 2002 at the International Filmfest Emden, where it came second in the competition for the Bernhard Wicki Prize. A few weeks later, it participated in the Moscow International Film Festival. The film had its first wide cinema release in United Kingdom and Ireland, where it opened on 31 January 2003.

== Cast ==
- Pauline Collins as Thelma Caldicot
- Terence Rigby as Henry Caldicot
- Peter Capaldi as Derek
- Anna Wilson-Jones as Veronica
- Gwenllian Davies as Audrey
- Sheila Reid as Joyce
- Frank Mills as Leslie
- Julie Wilson Nimmo as Nurse Knight
- Frank Middlemass as Bernard
- John Alderton as Hawksmoor
- Isla Blair as Matron
- Angela Bruce as Gina
- Paul Freeman as Jenkins
- Martin Jarvis as JB
- Tony Robinson as Nick Reid
- Camille Coduri as Jackie Jones, a news journalist
- Jamie Martin as Boy PC
- Amanda Haberland as Girl PC

== Reception ==
BBC Films awarded the film a one-star review, stating: 'Lacking in laughs and light on radical zeal, this is the kind of unambitious British cinema that should have been pensioned off a long time ago.'
