= The Monk (1990 film) =

- Directed by: Francisco Lara Polop
- Written by: Francisco Lara Polop
- Based on: The Monk by Matthew Gregory Lewis
- Produced by: Francisco Lara Polop; Muir Sutherland
- Starring: Paul McGann; Sophie Ward
- Cinematography: Angel Luis Fernandez
- Music by: Anton Garcia Abril
- Distributed by: Celtic Films/Mediterraneo Cine-TV
- Release date: 1990
- Countries: United Kingdom; Spain
- Language: English

The Monk (also known as The Final Temptation or The Seduction of a Priest) is a 1990 historical drama film directed by Francisco Lara Polop and starring Paul McGann and Sophie Ward. Based on the 1796 Gothic novel The Monk by Matthew Gregory Lewis, it was adapted for the screen by Polop, and employs the common depiction of the 18th century representing “the stately, the lavish, the sensuous, and even the lubricious.” In this way, The Monk can be seen as a heritage film, in which “the past is delivered as a museum of sounds and images, an iconographic display,” though these films are sometimes discredited as attempts to “transform the past into a series of commodities for the entertainment market.” The film was Lara Polop's last as a director, and continues the themes of eroticism and horror found throughout his works.

== Synopsis ==
The film begins in 18th century Spain, with Father Lorenzo (Paul McGann) and Mother Agueda (Isla Blair) being tried before the Spanish Inquisition, and Lorenzo agreeing to confess and tell his story in order to escape torture. The setting then turns to the past, where Lorenzo is a charismatic and admired priest. He listens to a confession by a young nun named Sister Ines (Aitana Sanchez-Gijon), who has become pregnant, and reports her to the covenant's leader, Mother Agueda, despite the girl's pleas for help.

After this, a young monk named Juan reveals to Lorenzo she is actually a woman, Matilde de la Venegas (Sophie Ward). Matilde is a wealthy orphan who fell in love with Lorenzo while attending one of his sermons, and entered his covenant in disguise in order to be near him. Lorenzo goes to report her and she threatens to commit suicide, claiming she does not care about the damnation this act would bring her.

Elsewhere in the covenant, the nuns are gathered and debating what to do with Sister Ines. Some of the nuns want to report to her the Inquisition, following protocol and ensuring the girl a fair trial, but Agueda, angered by Ines's denials of her advances, convinces the nuns that the girl's obvious guilt allows the covenant to deal with her themselves, and they imprison Ines in a cell beneath the monastery.

Matilde continues to pursue Lorenzo, though he still wants her to leave, as he is attracted to her and afraid of breaking his priestly vows. She agrees to go, but as Lorenzo reaches into the garden to give her a goodbye rose, he is bitten by a snake. He recovers only to discover Matilde saved his life by sucking the venom from his wound, poisoning herself gravely ill in the process. Lorenzo is overcome by her love for him and they make love, breaking Lorenzo's vows.

Ramon (Mark Elstob), a young nobleman and Ines’ lover, coming looking for her at the covenant, but is turned away. When he later returns with a papal order for Ines’ release from the covenant, Agueda lies to him that Ines died from a sudden illness. Lorenzo becomes the confessor for an elderly member of his congregation, and impassioned by his regained sexuality, begins pursuing the woman's innocent daughter Angela (Sophie Linfield). He becomes distant from Matilde and confronts Angela, but she denies him and he is thrown out of the house. Matilde convinces Lorenzo to continue after Angela, saying she will do anything to make him happy, and reveals she knows black magic. Lorenzo agrees to her plan, and in a Satanic ritual Matilde creates a potion that will leave Angela helpless to Lorenzo. That night Angela's mother discovers Lorenzo administering the potion to her sleeping daughter, and Lorenzo kills her to keep her from crying out. Matilde appears to Lorenzo in a demonic form, and instructs him to cover up the murder by making it appear as though she committed suicide.

While Lorenzo is attempting to rape Angela in the bedchamber of the covenant, Ramon arrives with the Inquisition and discovers Ines imprisoned in the basement. Needing to hide from the Inquisition, Matilde attempts to kill Angela but is stopped by Lorenzo, who regrets aloud conspiring with Matilde in the first place. The inquisition discovers them in the act and the story returns to the present, where Lorenzo is still being tried before the Inquisition. Agueda is imprisoned for life for her illicit confinement of Ines, and Lorenzo is convinced of devil-worship, and is burned at the stake.

== Cast ==
- Paul McGann (Father Lorenzo Rojas)
- Sophie Ward (Matilde de la Venegas/Juan)
- Sophie Linfield (Angela Dauphin)
- Isla Blair (Mother Agueda)
- Freda Dowie (Sister Ursula)
- Mark Elstob (Ramon de Madeira)
- Aitana Sánchez-Gijón (Sister Ines)
- Laura Davenport (Dona Elvira Dauphin)
- Marina Saura (Jacinta)

== Variance from source text ==
There are a number of differences between the film and the original novel. Lorenzo is named Ambrosio in Lewis's novel, and Angela is named Antonia. The film version leaves out multiple subplots, such the bleeding nun and Lorenzo's sister, and has Lorenzo burned at the stake, omitting the majority of the book's conclusion, which has Lorenzo instead sell his soul to the Devil in order to escape the Inquisition, only to be denied repentance and condemned to eternal torment.

== Other adaptations ==
Le Moine, Ado Kyrou, (1972). Luis Buñuel and Jean-Claude Carrière attempted to film a version of The Monk in the 1960s, but the project was halted due to lack of funds. Buñuel's friend, the Greek director Ado Kyrou, used this script as the basis for his 1972 film version. Le Moine (English: The Monk) boasted an international cast with Franco Nero in the title role. The film also starred Nathalie Delon, Eliana de Santis, Nadja Tiller and Nicol Williamson.
