= Isla Blair =

British actress (born 1944)

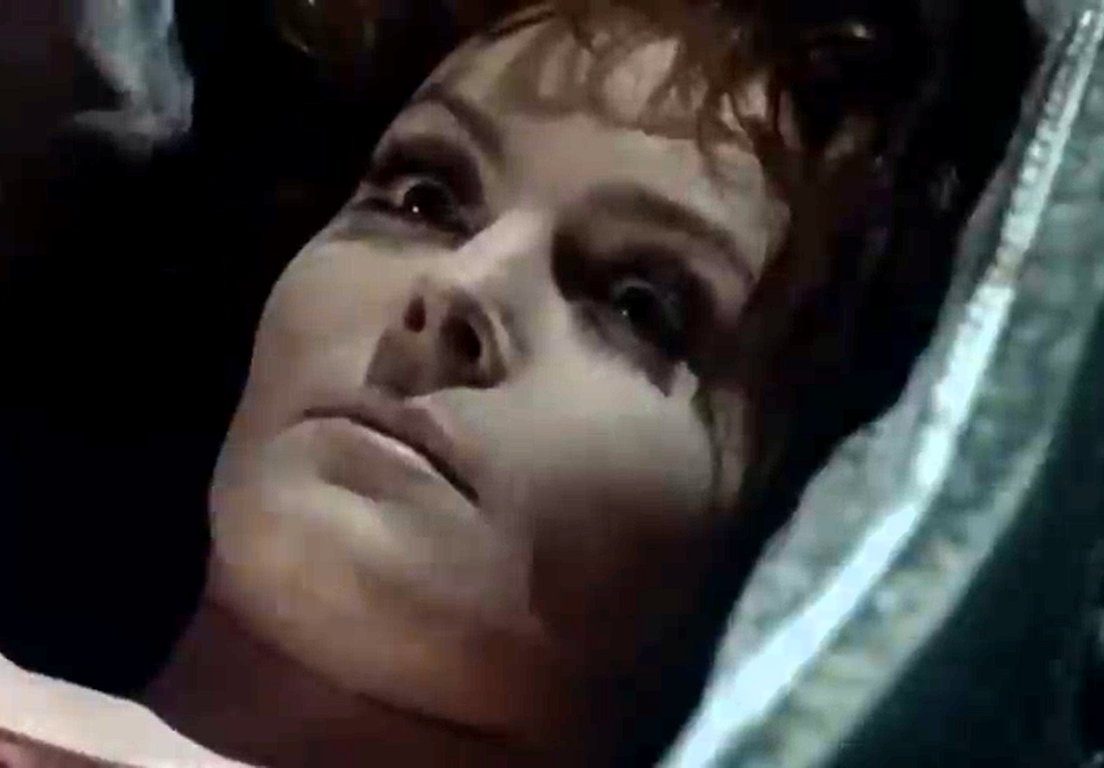
- Blair in Taste the Blood of Dracula (1970)
- Born: 29 September 1944 (age 81); Bangalore, Kingdom of Mysore, British India
- Occupation: Actress
- Years active: 1965–present
- Spouse: Julian Glover (m. 1968)
- Children: Jamie Glover

Isla Blair Glover (born 29 September 1944) is a British actress and singer. She made her first stage appearance in 1963 as Philia in the London debut of A Funny Thing Happened on the Way to the Forum.

== Early life and education ==
Isla Blair was born in Bangalore, India, on 29 September 1944. Her father, Ian Baxter Blair-Hill, was a British tea planter. Blair's interest in performing arts first became apparent when, at the age of two, she gave an impromptu singing performance on the boat ride from India to the United Kingdom. She went on to attend the Royal Academy of Dramatic Art to prepare for a career in acting.

== Career ==
Blair made her first stage appearance at the Strand Theatre on 3 October 1963 playing the part of Philia in the London debut of A Funny Thing Happened on the Way to the Forum. She joined the Royal Shakespeare Company for their 1971 season, during which she portrayed Emilia in The Man of Mode and Aglaya in Subject to Fits. In 1973, Blair toured the Middle East with the Prospect Theatre Company in the role of Viola in Twelfth Night. Other venues at which Blair has performed include the Old Vic and the Nottingham Playhouse.

One of Blair's earliest experiences working in film was in a scene with Paul McCartney in the 1964 film A Hard Day's Night. McCartney offered to drive Blair home after the shoot, but upon exiting the building, the two were swarmed by fans who scratched and kicked Blair in an attempt to reach McCartney. The following day, she declined a second offer of a ride from McCartney. The scene they had been filming, which was Blair's only scene in the movie, was eventually cut and lost.

Her first credited film appearance was in the 1965 horror film Dr. Terror's House of Horrors as an art gallery assistant. Her other film appearances include A Flea in Her Ear (1968), Battle of Britain (1969), Taste the Blood of Dracula (1970), Indiana Jones and the Last Crusade (1989, as the wife of her real-life husband Julian Glover, and credited as Mrs. Glover), Valmont (1989), The Monk (1990), The House of Angelo (1997), The Match (1999), Mrs Caldicot's Cabbage War (2002), AfterLife (2003) and Johnny English Reborn (2011).

Blair guest starred in two episodes of Space: 1999; appearing in 1975, along with Anthony Valentine, in War Games and in 1976, along with Freddie Jones, in Journey to Where. In 1976, Blair played Emma Antrobus in the ITV drama series The Crezz. She played a principal role (Sally) in the BBC's alternative history TV serial An Englishman's Castle, first broadcast in 1978. One of her best known TV appearances was as Flora Beniform in The History Man (1981) alongside Anthony Sher. Blair played Claire Carlsen, Francis Urquhart's Parliamentary Private Secretary, in The Final Cut (1995). In 2003, she played opposite John Nettles in an episode of Midsomer Murders as a psychological profiler. She played Nanny Langton in The Star of Jacob, Father Brown (S5:E1, 2016). She played the part of a foreign agent, disguised as a bride, in The Avengers episode "A Funny Thing Happened On The Way To The Station". (1967)

In 2010, she appeared at The Orange Tree Theatre, Richmond in The Company Man by Torben Betts. She was nominated for the Offie for Best Actress.

Blair has narrated many audiobooks. In 2014–15 she appeared in the stage musical Made in Dagenham.

== Personal life ==
Blair is married to fellow actor Julian Glover, with whom she has a son, actor Jamie Glover. Along with Prunella Scales, Blair and Glover were involved with the expansion of the Salisbury Playhouse. She was vice president of TACT, the Actors' Children's Trust, in 2015 and trustee in 2018.

== Filmography ==
=== Film ===
Year	Title	Role	Notes
1964	A Hard Day's Night	Young Actress	Scene deleted
1965	Dr. Terror's House of Horrors	Pretty Girl	Uncredited
1968	A Flea in Her Ear	Antoinette	
1968	The Three Princes	Princess Yasmin	TV film
1969	Battle of Britain	Mrs. Moore	
1970	Taste the Blood of Dracula	Lucy Paxton	
1970	The Hero of My Life	Ellen Ternan	TV film
1974	The Canterville Ghost	Lady Stutfield	TV film
1976	Alien Attack	Female Alien	TV film
1983	The Beggar's Opera	Jenny Diver	TV film
1984	Real Life	Anna	
1985	Off Peak	Elizabeth	TV film
1989	Indiana Jones and the Last Crusade	Mrs. Donovan	
1989	Valmont	Baroness	
1990	Treasure Island	Mrs. Hawkins	TV film
1990	The Monk	Mother Agueda	
1996	In Your Dreams	Jamie's Mother	TV film
1997	The House of Angelo	Peg Wallington	
1998	Heaven on Earth	Mary Weston	TV film
1999	The Match	Sheila Bailey	
1999	The Greatest Store in the World	Grand Lady	TV film
2002	Mrs Caldicot's Cabbage War	Matron	
2003	AfterLife	Dr. Jackson	
2005	The Quatermass Experiment	Blaker	TV film
2011	Johnny English Reborn	Shirley	
2016	Brash Young Turks	Newsreader	Voice role
2017	Amy and Sophia	Vivien	
2020	The Reverend and Mrs Simpson	Anna Wilson	

=== Television ===
Year	Title	Role	Notes
1965	Laughter from the Whitehall	Rhoda Marley	Episode: "Rookery Nook"
1966	The Liars	Sarah	Series regular
1966	This Man Craig	Jean Stoddart	Episode: "A Rough Passage"
1967	ITV Play of the Week	Daphne Stillington	Episode: "Present Laughter"
1967	The Avengers	Bride	Episode: "A Funny Thing Happened on the Way to the Station"
1967	Mickey Dunne	Babs Chesterton-Manville	Episode: "A Handful of Coloured Chalks"
1968	The Dickie Henderson Show	Jane	Recurring role
1968	Gazette	Bettie Strickland	Episode: "In Between the Lines"
1969	The Saint	Janine Flambeau	Episode: "The Ex-King of Diamonds"
1969	Department S	Elaine	Episode: "The Treasure of the Costa Del Sol"
1970–1971	The Doctors	Dr. Linda Carpenter	Series regular
1971	Jason King	Anne Winters	Episode: "A Red Red Rose Forever"
1972	Spy Trap	Marie Hansen	Episode: "A Visit from Hamburg"
1973	The Regiment	Lucy Franshaw	Episode: "Troopship"
1974	Fall of Eagles	Grand Duchess Ella	Mini-series
1974	Warship	Sarah Foules	Episode: "Nothing to Starboard"
1975	The Venturers	Joanne Kelly	Episode: "Gilt Edged"
1975	Dixon of Dock Green	Fleur Harris	Episode: "A Slight Case of Love"
1975	A Legacy	Caroline Trafford	2 episodes
1975	Quiller	Germaine Allenby	Episode: "Sacrifice to Survival"
1975	Space: 1999	Female Alien	Episode: "War Games"
1976	Space: 1999	Carla	Episode: "Journey to Where"
1976	One-Upmanship		Episode: "Womanship"
1976	The Crezz	Emma Antrobus	Series regular
1976–1977	When the Boat Comes In	Lady Caroline	5 episodes
1978	BBC2 Play of the Week	Christina	Episode: "Forgotten Love Songs"
1978	Wilde Alliance	Helen Bardskey	Episode: "Too Much Too Often"
1978	Blake's 7	Sinofar	Episode: "Duel"
1978	An Englishman's Castle	Jill	Mini-series
1981	The History Man	Flora Beniform	Mini-series
1981	Only When I Laugh	Nurse Bradley	Episode: "Dear Diary"
1982	Alexa	Alexa	Mini-series
1982–1983	The Bounder	Laura Miles	Series regular
1983	Crown Court	Melissa St. John	Episode: "Brainwashed: Part 1"
1983	Doctor Who	Isabella	Episode: "The King's Demons"
1983–1984	Storybook International	Narrator	Series regular
1984	Hammer House of Mystery and Suspense	Eileen	Episode: "Tennis Court"
1985	Screen Two	Constance Scott	Episode: "Poppyland"
1985	Taggart	Eleanor Samson	Episode: "Murder in Season"
1986	Hold the Back Page	Val Barnett	Episode: "Our Man on the Spot"
1986	King and Castle	The Honorable Lisa Berkeley	Episode: "Romance"
1987	C.A.T.S. Eyes	Penny Osmond	Episode: "Backlash"
1987	Boogie Outlaws	Inspector Leesley	Mini-series
1988	Bookie	Sylvia Cowan	Mini-series
1989	Mother Love	Ruth Vesey	Mini-series
1990	Haggard	Lady Amelia Foulacre	Episode: "Eye of Newt"
1991	Boon	Caroline Mortlake	Episode: "Pillow Talk"
1991–1992	The Advocates	Katherine Dunbar	Series regular
1992	The Good Guys	Maggie	Episode: "Horseplay"
1992	Inspector Morse	Janey Wilson	Episode: "Cherubim & Seraphim"
1992	The Darling Buds of May	Caroline Lime	Episode: "Le Grand Weekend"
1993	Medics	Janet Wendell	1 episode
1994	Taggart	Lavinia Martin	Episode: "Hellfire"
1995	The Final Cut	Claire Carlsen	Mini-series
1995	Doctor Finlay	Stroma Kennedy	Episode: "No Time for Heroes"
1997	A Touch of Frost	Rosalie Martin	3 episodes
1998	The Bill	Barbara Chambers	Episode: "Too Many Cooks"
1998	Heartbeat	Elaine Aubrey	Episode: "Taking Sides"
2000	The Mrs Bradley Mysteries	Myrtle Quincy	Episode: "The Worsted Viper"
2000	Dalziel and Pascoe	Florence Stockton	Episode: "Foreign Bodies"
2002	Holby City	Mary Harrow	Episode: "Love and Devotion"
2003	Midsomer Murders	Dr. Jane Moore	Episode: "Death and Dreams"
2004	New Tricks	Alice Pimley	Episode: "Good Work Rewarded"
2006	Casualty	Agnes Ross	Episode: "It's Now or Never"
2010	Single Father	Beatty	Mini-series
2010	Law & Order: UK	Carla Hopley, D.P.P.	2 episodes
2013	Quick Cuts	Jenny	1 episode
2014	Grantchester	Gladys Sheppard	1 episode
2016	Father Brown	Nanny Langton	Episode: "The Star of Jacob"
2019	Casualty	Alice Jones	1 episode
