= The Minister of Chance =

Multi-media fantasy series

Radio Static, Arcbeatle Press audio drama
- Series
- Written by: Dan Freeman
- Directed by: Dan Freeman
- Release date: February 2011 - May 2013
- Language: English

The Minister of Chance is a fantasy multi-media series created by Dan Freeman and Radio Static. It is a spin-off of the Doctor Who webcast Death Comes to Time, where the titular character first appeared, portrayed by Stephen Fry. Stars of the audio drama series included Sylvester McCoy, Paul McGann and Jenny Agutter.

In 2014 a live action short was filmed based on The Prologue of the audio series, starring Paul McGann and Tim McInnerny, was released. It was funded by the series' international fanbase. Soon after the release, a Kickstarter campaign began in the hope of securing funding for episode one of a Minister of Chance movie. Crowdfunding for the movie was unsuccessful, with only half of the required funds being pledged.

The audio series was remastered in late 2020 and released as a series of 10 minute episodes.

A novel of the series written by Freeman was announced in 2022 by American publisher Arcbeatle Press and released in the same year.

== Audio Series (2011-2013) ==
=== Synopsis ===
In a world far from our own, Ambassador Durian of Sezuan is dispatched on a peace mission to the primitive island nation of Tanto, but things take a turn for the very, very sinister. In a nearby inn, a mysterious stranger appears, then disappears through a miraculous portal in the forest (he “knows the formula for doors”). The inquisitive teenage barmaid, Kitty follows him, with no shoes and only her superhuman strength to keep her company. Another world awaits, where they will be forced into an alliance to save the Universe, and beyond.

=== Episodes ===
Title	Written by	Format	Company	Original release date
"The Pointed Hand"	Dan Freeman	Download	Radio Static	February 2011
Ambassador Durian of Sezuan (Paul McGann) is dispatched to the primitive island nation of Tanto to talk peace. However, his offers of friendship to the belligerent King (Mark Lewis) fall on deaf ears, and things take a turn for the very, very sinister.
"The Broken World"	Dan Freeman	Download	Radio Static	March 2011
Kitty is a barmaid at the Traveller's Rest in the occupied city of Tantillion. Her normal activities (abusing customers, starting fights) are interrupted by the arrival of a stranger...
"The Forest Shakes"	Dan Freeman	Download	Radio Static	May 2011
After her strange journey with The Minister, Kitty awakens in darkness, disorientated and alone... or maybe not. There are things moving in the dark, and perhaps not all of them human.
"Paludin Fields"	Dan Freeman	Download	Radio Static	July 2012
The Minister and Kitty arrive in the strange and murderous marshes of Paludin Fields in search of the Sage of The Waves. Meanwhile, in Sezuan, Durian finally shows his hand. In the forests of Tanto, meanwhile, Professor Cantha sees the full extent of the Sezians' assault on Science.
"The Tiger"	Dan Freeman	Download	Radio Static	February 2013
The Horseman finally catches up with The Minister and an injured Kitty on the Plain of Tombs in Paludin Fields. Meanwhile in Tanto, Professor Cantha and Sunflower spread the ancient knowledge of Science amongst the people of Tanto. In Sezuan, Durian's ambitions are realized with the help of the vicious Lord Rathen.
"In a Bark on the River Hex"	Dan Freeman	Download	Radio Static	May 2013
Following Lord Rathen's calamitous attack, the shell-shocked Kitty and The Minister attempt to salvage what they can. The Minister is driven to form risky and desperate allegiances, voyaging up the mythical River Hex to get help. Meanwhile, Cantha and Sunflower prepare for a suicide mission to end the War in the electrifying conclusion to the story.

=== Cast ===
- The Minister of Chance - Julian Wadham
- Kitty - Lauren Crace
- Professor Canta - Jenny Agutter
- Durian - Paul McGann
- The Witch Prime - Sylvester McCoy
- The Sage of the Waves - Tamsin Greig
- The Summer King - Philip Glenister

=== Reception ===
WIRED heavily praised the series, calling it, "Superbly acted, with an amazing cast of characters, and with rich, lavish, immersive soundscapes." Similarly, Elisabeth Mahoney of The Guardian called the series an, "ambitious and innovative project" and praised the sound design. Dylan Rees also praised the series and noted that it was not as much a spin-off of Doctor Who as it was its own thing, comparing it to the works Terry Pratchett.

The series won the 2013 Parsec Award for Best Speculative Fiction Audio Drama (Short Form).

== Short film (2014) ==
=== Synopsis ===
Another world: Kitty is a barmaid at the Traveller's Rest in the occupied city of Tantillion. One night, a stranger walks in, and through a door and over the Frost Bridge between worlds - and Kitty follows him.

=== Cast ===
- Durian - Paul McGann
- The King - Tim McInnerny
- Major Apper - Simon Bugg
- Spider Guard - Beccy Meany
- The Spider - Richard Oliver
- Princess Didi - Scribble
- Segway Rider - Lee Oulton

=== Reception ===
In Dylan Rees' reference book Downtime - The Lost Years of Doctor Who, Rees praised the film for the locations and effects, as well as McInnery's performance as the Minister. He did, however, criticize the presumed use of DSLR cameras, stating that it, "leaves the film looking cheap and amateur".

== Novel (2022) ==
The Minister of Chance
- Editor: James Hornby
- Author: Dan Freeman
- Cover artist: Dave Palser
- Publisher: Arcbeatle Press
- Publication date: 30 June 2022
- Pages: 202

=== Synopsis ===
“I know the formula for doors,” says the Minister as he disappears through a doorway he has just created in mid-air. Kitty, a teenage barmaid, is not easily put off. Despite having little more than a sharp tongue, a foul mouth and mysterious strength, she follows him through the glowing doorway, onto the frost bridge between worlds and into an unexpected adventure.
