= Fables of Forgotten Things =

Fables of Forgotten Things is a British television drama series that stars Doctor Who actor Paul McGann. In 2008 a pilot episode was made available on the BBC Website, and later broadcast on BBC HD in the Winter of 2009/10. However, no further episodes have yet been announced.
