= Vernon Coleman =

British author and conspiracy theorist

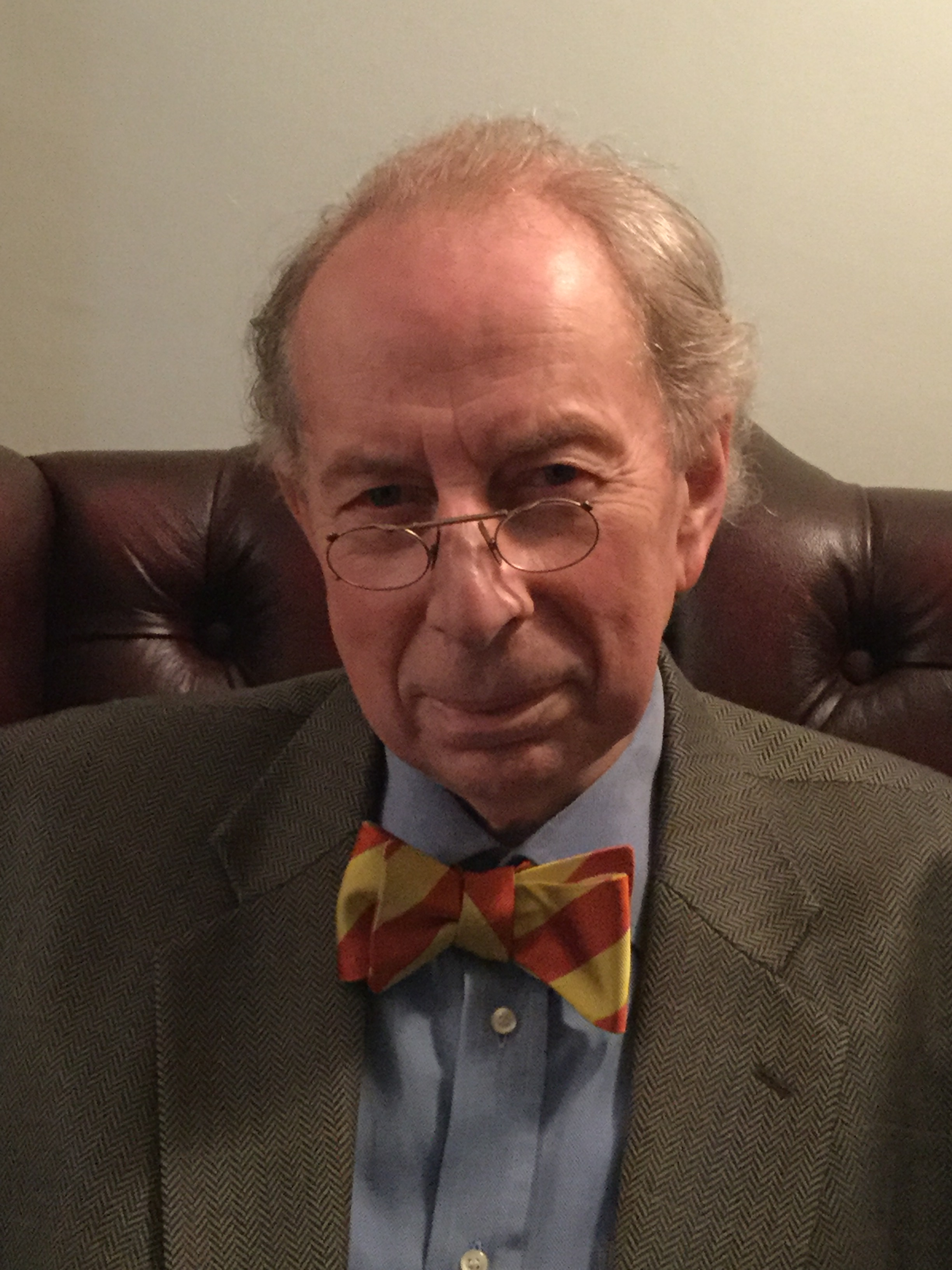
- Coleman in 2019
- Born: 1946 (age 79–80)
- Occupations: General practitioner (GP) (formerly); Newspaper columnist (formerly); Conspiracy theorist; Novelist
- Years active: 1970–2016 (as a GP)
- Notable work: Mrs Caldicot's Cabbage War

Vernon Edward Coleman (born 1946) is an English conspiracy theorist and writer, who writes on topics related to human health, politics and animal welfare. He is most notable for his AIDS denialism, anti-vaccine activism and COVID-19 disinformation. He was formerly a general practitioner (GP) and newspaper columnist. Coleman's medical claims have been widely discredited and described as pseudoscientific conspiracy theories.

== Early life ==
Coleman was born in 1946, the only child of an electrical engineer. He was raised in Walsall, Staffordshire, in the West Midlands of England, where he attended Queen Mary's Grammar School and a medical school in Birmingham.

== Career ==
Coleman qualified as a physician in 1970 and worked as a GP. In 1981, the Department of Health and Social Security (DHSS) fined him for refusing to write the diagnoses on sick notes, which he considered a breach of patient confidentiality.

After publishing his first book, The Medicine Men, in 1976, which accused the National Health Service of being controlled by pharmaceutical companies, Coleman left the NHS.

Coleman has since written under multiple pen names; in the late 1970s, he published three novels about life as a GP under the name Edward Vernon.

In 1994 Coleman was ordered to pay damages for threatening scientist Colin Blakemore, who had been targeted by anti-vivisection activists after a letter bomb sent by animal rights group calling itself 'The Justice Department' was sent to Blakemore's home, with another exploding and injuring three people. Blakemore was later granted a temporary injunction by a High Court judge after Coleman had said he would publish a pamphlet with Blakemore's home address and telephone number to encourage the public to 'get in touch with you to discuss your work'. Coleman was ordered not to publish anything that might jeopardize Colin Blakemore's safety and to give solicitors the names of anyone to whom he might already have given the information.

Coleman went on to work as a newspaper columnist for a number of publications, including The Sun and The Sunday People, where he was an agony uncle until he resigned in 2003.

Coleman was made an honorary professor by the International Open University based in Sri Lanka.

=== Writing and media appearances ===
Coleman's self-published books and blog have been reported as a major source of misinformation regarding the COVID-19 pandemic, cancer, HIV/AIDS, vaccines and human health.

A 1989 editorial in the British Medical Journal criticised Coleman's comments made for The Sun as the 'Sun Doctor' on leprosy as a 'particularly distasteful piece of tabloid journalism...[containing] a catalogue of selected facts and misinterpretations' following the announcement that Diana, Princess of Wales, was to shake hands with a person with leprosy. The incident was later covered on Channel 4's Hard News, with Coleman declining to defend his statement without a fee covering travel costs.

Coleman's 1993 novel Mrs Caldicot's Cabbage War was turned into a film in 2002 with the same name.

Whilst working for The Sunday People, Coleman wrote that if children diagnosed with autism were "stuck up to their necks in a vat full of warm sewage for 10 hours they would soon learn some manners" and that diagnoses of hyperactivity and autism were "misused by middle-class, aspirational parents to excuse the behaviour of their obnoxious children." Following the article, autism charities received phone calls from distressed parents. The Chairman of the East Anglian Autistic Support Trust whose elder son has severe autism, condemned Coleman's remarks as "irresponsible, medically unsound and deeply hurtful" to families that had a child with autism and challenged Coleman to spend 24 hours caring for his son in the presence of fully trained carers who understood the effects of autism. Coleman declined and refused to withdraw his remarks leading to an investigation by the Press Complaints Committee. During his time at the paper, Coleman was again censured by the Press Complaints Commission for making misleading medical claims.

Coleman became a self-published author in 2004 after Alice's Diary, a book about his cat, was turned down by traditional publishers. Coleman wrote a book denying climate change and claims global warming is a "malicious, dangerous myth".

=== Medical misinformation ===
On 17 November 1989, The Sun published an article under the headline "Straight sex cannot give you AIDS—official", claiming "the killer disease AIDS can only be caught by homosexuals, bisexuals, junkies or anyone who has received a tainted blood transfusion". The following day, Coleman supported The Sun's claims with an article under the headline "AIDS—The hoax of the century", similarly claiming AIDS was not a significant risk to heterosexuals, that medical companies, doctors and condom manufacturers were conspiring to scare the public and had vested interests in profiteering from public service announcements, and that moral campaigners were attempting to frighten young people into celibacy to establish traditional family values. Coleman also claimed gay activists were "worried that once it was widely known that AIDS was not a major threat to heterosexuals, then funds for AIDS research would fall". Journalist David Randall argued in The Universal Journalist that the story was one of the worst cases of journalistic malpractice in recent history.

Coleman has claimed that COVID-19 is a hoax, that vaccines are dangerous, and that face masks cause cancer. All these claims have been debunked by more senior medical professionals. Coleman has also claimed the COVID-19 pandemic has links to the Agenda 21 Conspiracy Theory and the Great Reset Theory, which both suggest a cabal of elite figures are attempting to depopulate the global community. No evidence has been found to support these claims.

In 2019, Coleman wrote a book titled Anyone Who Tells You Vaccines Are Safe And Effective Is Lying. Booksellers such as Amazon and Waterstones were criticised for selling the book.

In February 2021, Coleman claimed "no one can possibly know if the COVID-19 vaccine is safe and effective because the trial is still underway; thousands of people who had the vaccine have died or been seriously injured by it; legally, all those people giving vaccinations are war criminals". These claims were debunked by Health Feedback, a member of the World Health Organization-led project Vaccine Safety Net. Coleman later claimed "COVID-19 vaccines are dangerous" and that "bodies of vaccinated people are laboratories making lethal viruses". Both claims were similarly debunked as inaccurate, misleading and unsupported by the Poynter Institute due to a lack of evidence from the legitimate medical community. Coleman has also claimed in a viral video that "the jabbed will be lucky to last five years" which was again proven to false due to a lack of evidence. In a similar widely circulated social media post, Coleman claimed "more children will be seriously injured or killed by the vaccination than the COVID-19 infection itself" which was again found to be false as there is no evidence that children suffer more from COVID-19 vaccines than from COVID-19.

At an anti-lockdown protest in London on 24 July 2021, Coleman claimed that the wearing of face masks caused cancer, dementia, hypoxia and hypercapnia, bacterial pneumonia due to oxygen deficiency. These claims were similarly debunked by the medical community due to a lack of peer-reviewed evidence. Coleman later claimed that the wearing of face masks caused mucormycosis, despite no link being found between mask wearing and mucormycosis. All evidence suggests that wearing masks are a safe and an effective way to protect individuals from COVID-19.

In November 2021, Coleman made the false claim that "this [vaccination] jab was an experiment certain to kill and injure" which was debunked due to its lack of evidence and a reliance upon a discredited research report authored by Steven Gundry.

Despite being debunked, Coleman's conspiracy theories have been used to push COVID-19 denial, pseudoscience and anti-mask propaganda. Police officers urged residents in Prestwich, Greater Manchester to dismiss anti-vaccination leaflets in May 2021 which had been distributed in the area and credited to Coleman. In a statement, the local authority "requested the public to dismiss the message being sent out and is encouraging all relevant age groups to take up the offer of a vaccine". The same leaflets were also distributed in Luton, Bedfordshire with Luton Council warning that the leaflets contained "dangerous misinformation". Similar leaflets have been distributed across Scotland and condemned by Shirley-Anne Somerville of the Scottish Parliament. The Catholic Church has also urged parishioners to "read the Vatican document on vaccination morality" after Coleman's anti-vaccination videos and quotations were circulated in 2021 by a Franciscan priest in Gosport, Hampshire. In an investigation, the Diocese of Portsmouth announced "The Catholic Diocese of Portsmouth is very disappointed that one of the Family of Mary Immaculate and St Francis in Gosport has publicly expressed a personal view about the Covid vaccination programme that is contrary to the official position of the Catholic Church and the Diocese. We would encourage all our parishioners to benefit from the protection afforded by the vaccine."

Coleman has also claimed the National Health Service "kills more people than it saves" referencing a flawed study by The BMJ to support this claim. He has also falsely claimed the NHS reduced "screening tests" to lower carbon emissions. Although there were a reduced number of cancer screenings due to a lack of resources during the COVID-19 pandemic, no evidence was found to support Coleman's claim that screenings were being limited in effort to combat global warming.

=== Advertising Standards Authority rulings ===
In 2005, the UK's Advertising Standards Authority (ASA) banned an advertisement for a book published by Coleman entitled How to Stop Your Doctor Killing You which claimed doctors were "the person most likely to kill you". The ASA upheld complaints that the advert was misleading, offensive and denigrated the medical profession. The ASA found Coleman's claims were lacking evidence, "irresponsible" and "likely to discourage vulnerable people from seeking essential medical treatment". In response to the ruling, Coleman called for the ASA to be banned and later made a complaint to the Office of Fair Trading, claiming "the ASA's action(s) are in breach of Article 10 of the Human Rights Act". The Office of Fair trading did not pursue Coleman's complaint.

In 2007, the ASA again found Coleman had made misleading claims in an advertisement promoting a supposed link between eating meat and contracting cancer. Coleman failed to respond to the ASA's enquiries and was subsequently found to have again breached the organisation's code of conduct, with the ASA deeming Coleman's advert was again lacking evidence and likely to cause undue fear and distress. Coleman was instructed not to further run the advertisement and informed to respond to future ASA investigations.

== Personal life ==
Coleman is married to Donna. He is a vegan and supports animal rights.
