= Diana Thomson =

English sculptor

Diana Thomson FRSS (born 1939) is an English sculptor. She has created public sculptures by commission, which stand in locations in Britain.

== Life ==
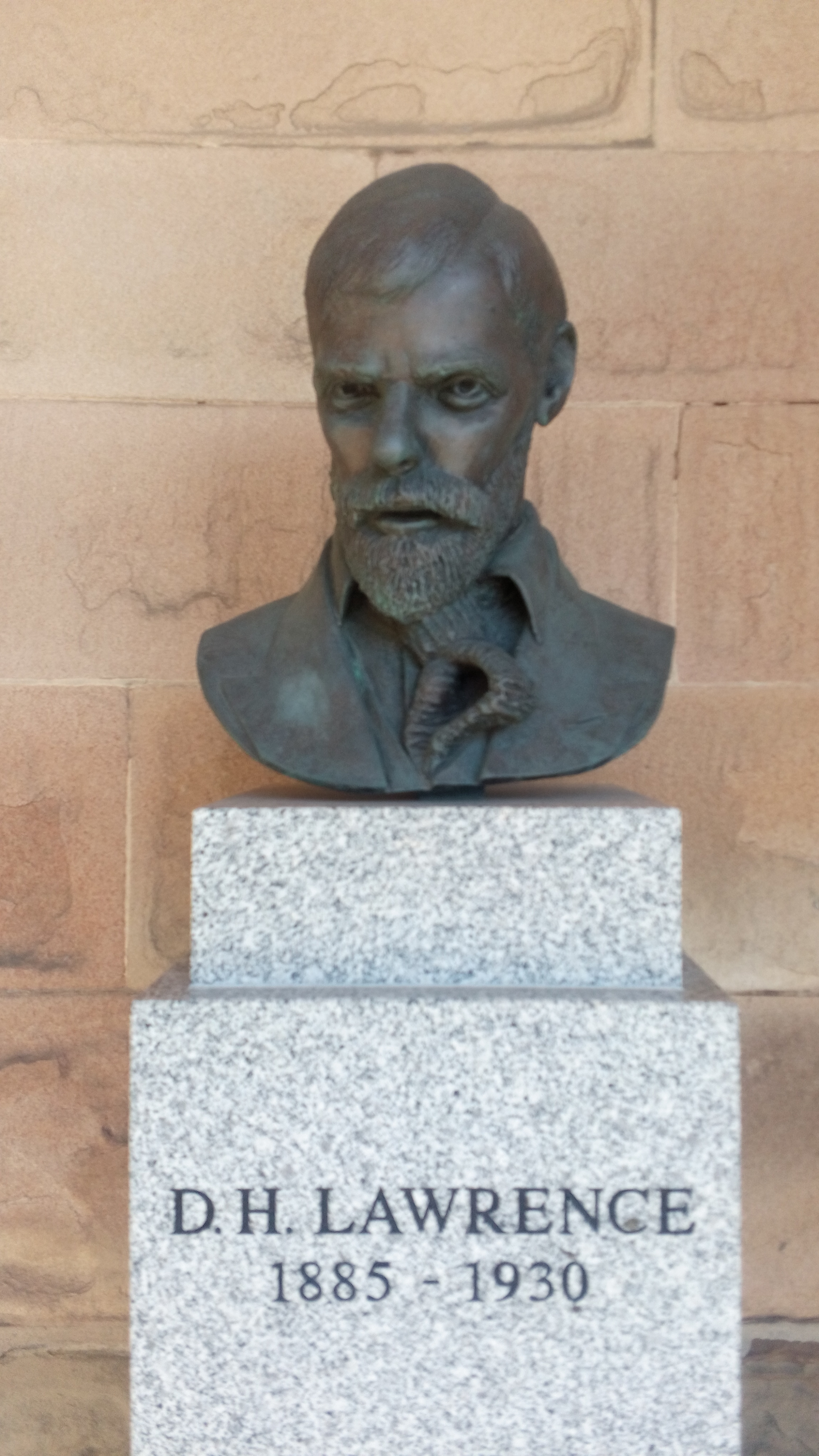
Bust of D. H. Lawrence, at Newstead Abbey, Nottinghamshire

Thomson was born in Manchester, and studied at Kingston Polytechnic from 1976 to 1979. She has exhibited at the Royal Academy and elsewhere. She was elected an associate of the Royal Society of Sculptors in 1981, and a fellow in 1990.

She was married to the cinematographer Alex Thomson, who died in 2007; they had a daughter.

== Works ==
Thomson has said that "the human figure is the best way that I can express myself in my sculpture... I kept to my own themes and expressions during training, and beyond in my public commissions". Her works include the following:

A sculpture "Father and Child" was shown at the summer exhibition of the Royal Academy in 1982.

A statue of D. H. Lawrence stands in the grounds of the University of Nottingham. A bust of Lawrence, relating to the statue, is at Newstead Abbey, Nottinghamshire.

"The Swanmaster", in Staines-upon-Thames, was commissioned by Spelthorne Borough Council and unveiled in 1983. It is a bronze statue, height 7 feet (2.1 m).

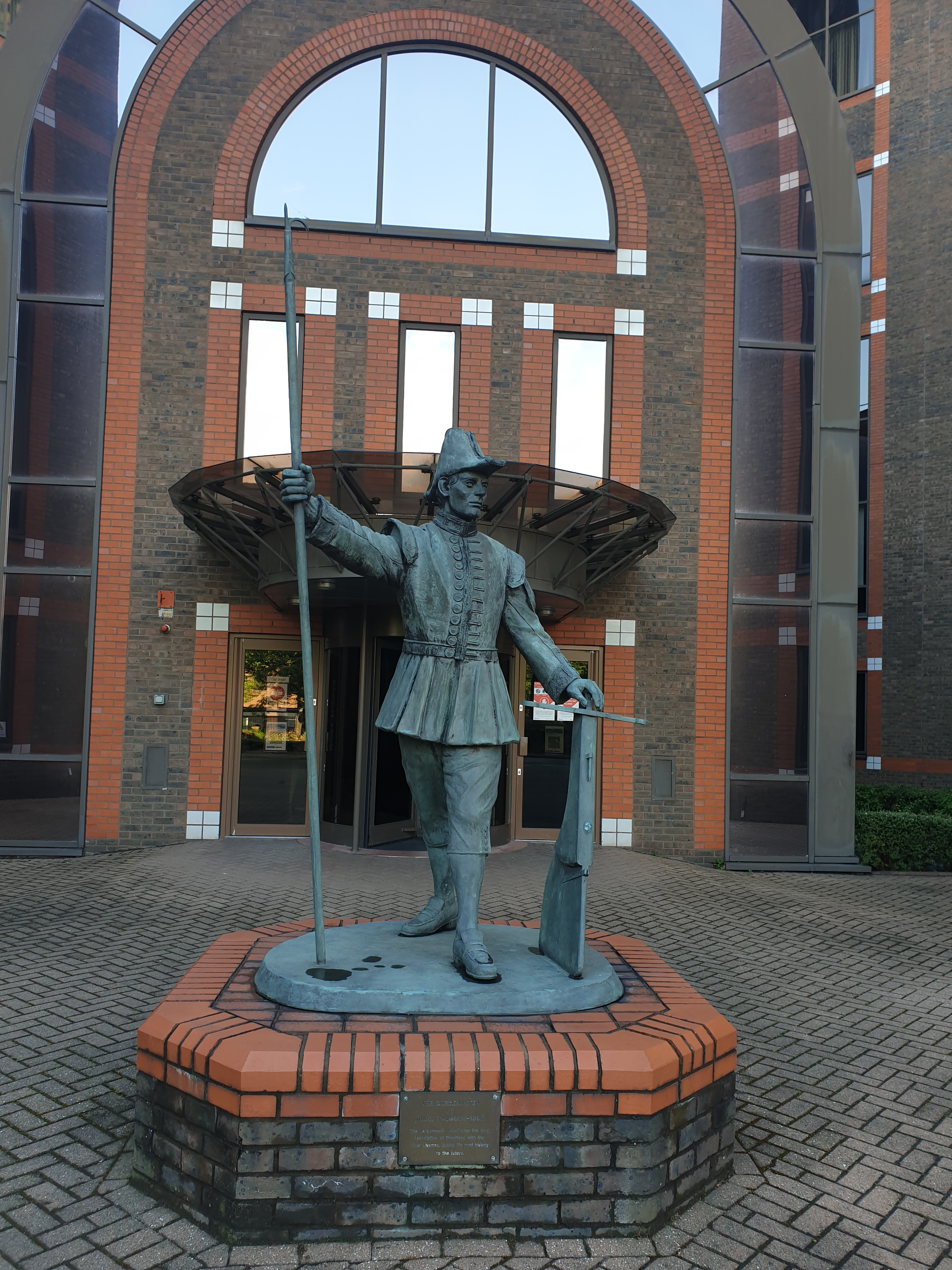
"The Bargemaster", in Brentford, West London

"The Bargemaster", unveiled in 1990, was commissioned by Dell EMC, and stands in front of their building in Brentford. The bronze statue, height 7 feet (2.1 m), of a bargemaster celebrates the long association of Brentford with the River Thames.

A bronze statue of William Friese-Greene was unveiled on 15 January 1999 at Shepperton Studios.

A children's book, A Story for the Children of Today, written and illustrated with watercolour paintings by Thomson, was published in 2019.
