= Doctor Who audio productions =

Audio plays based on the popular TV series

The Doctor Who logo used as of 2022

A number of officially licensed audio productions based upon the long-running British science fiction television series Doctor Who have been produced over the years. Doctor Who stars an alien known as the Doctor, who has the ability to change their face and appearance when they die. They travel in time and space in a ship known as the TARDIS. The series began in 1963, though was cancelled in 1989. Following a failed revival via a 1996 TV movie, the show was revived in 2005.

Though a few scattered releases existed throughout the 1960s, a major release for Doctor Who audio productions did not exist until the 1976 release of Doctor Who and Pescatons. Later radio stories were released during the 1980s and 1990s. During the 1980s, fans began to produce their own fan-made audio productions, with many becoming highly popular. One of the most popular of these groups, the Audio Visuals, had its members eventually obtain a license from the BBC, Doctor Who's parent company, in the 1990s. These fans founded the company Big Finish Productions, which ended up officially producing audio dramas for the franchise following the 1999 release of their first officially licensed audio drama, The Sirens of Time. Another member of the group ended up founding BBV Productions, which produced unofficial audio dramas based on characters from the series. Several other official audio productions have been produced based on the franchise.

Initial radio releases garnered high popularity with fans, and many fan-made audio groups have become highly popular and influential within the community. Big Finish has similarly been described as popular among fans, with its style of story credited with influencing the tone of the show's 2005 revival. One of its audio releases, 2003's Jubilee, was later adapted into the 2005 television story "Dalek".

== Early productions and radio stories ==
Doctor Who is a British science-fiction television series that began in 1963. It stars an alien known as the Doctor, who has the ability to change their face and appearance when they die. They travel in time and space in a ship known as the TARDIS.

One of the earliest audio releases for the franchise was an abridged version of the soundtrack of the 1966 film Daleks' Invasion Earth 2150 A.D., which was aired on radio in the same year as its release. Though an original radio series starring Peter Cushing as his film role was reportedly in the works, with a pilot recorded, the pilot was never broadcast and is believed to have been lost. An abridged episode of 1966 serial The Chase was released by Century 21 Records in the same year. After this, Doctor Who saw no further audio releases for nearly a decade. In 1974, an audio production starring Jon Pertwee as the Third Doctor dubbed Glorious Goodwood was planned to release as a radio sketch, though ended up being scrapped.

The first major Doctor Who audio production, released on LP record in 1976, was a children's adventure entitled Doctor Who and the Pescatons by Victor Pemberton. This story featured Tom Baker and Elisabeth Sladen reprising their on-screen roles as the Fourth Doctor and Sarah Jane Smith. This production aimed to branch out into the successful vinyl market at a time of high popularity for the show, though ended up not being very popular. In 1976, Baker and Sladen reprised their roles in "The Time Machine", an episode of the BBC Schools series Exploration Earth. It is credited as laying the groundwork for future Doctor Who radio plays produced in the 1980s and 1990s.

1985's Slipback was the next radio production made. Starring Colin Baker and Nicola Bryant in their television roles as the Sixth Doctor and Peri Brown, as well as Valentine Dyall as antagonist Captain Slarn. This story was written by Doctor Who's script editor at the time, Eric Saward. Slipback was aired during an 18-month hiatus for the show and thus became highly anticipated by fans. It received highly positive responses from the fanbase, though some felt it was too comedic in nature and conflicted with on-screen canon. Slipback was later be novelised by Saward, and was later released in the US. Slipback was also released on a record album alongside the soundtrack of the 1975 serial Genesis of the Daleks. Following the series' cancellation in 1989, no more radio productions were produced until 1993.

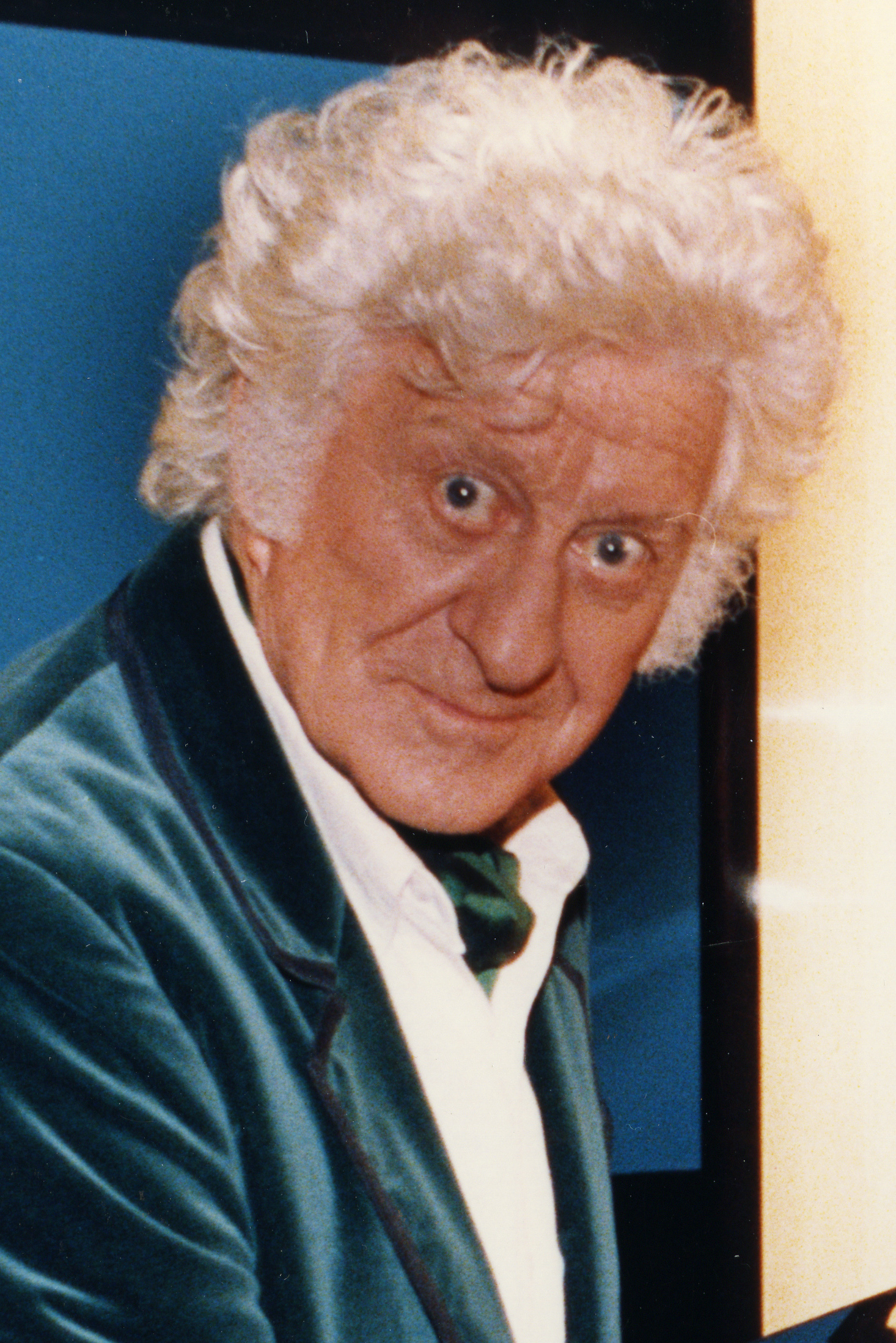
Jon Pertwee (pictured in-character as the Third Doctor in 1985) portrayed his on-screen role in two radio productions in the 1990s

Due to the lack of official releases of Doctor Who on physical media, fans wanting to rewatch past episodes were forced to resort to unofficial off-air recordings of prior episode airings, as home video releases for the franchise would not occur until the 1990s. Additionally, those wanting further adventures beyond what was on-screen ended up producing fan-made audio drama series. The earliest known fan-made audio production group was dubbed Doctor Who Audio Dramas. Dating back to 1982, the fan group continues to produce fan-made audio dramas, with over 190 episodes being produced over a thirty-year span. Many other groups were formed over the years following Doctor Who Audio Dramas' founding. One of these groups was the highly popular series known as the Audio Visuals.

A five-part radio serial, The Paradise of Death, was aired in 1993. Written by former script editor Barry Letts, Paradise of Death starred Jon Pertwee, Elisabeth Sladen, and Nicholas Courtney in their on-screen roles of the Third Doctor, Sarah Jane Smith, and Brigadier Lethbridge-Stewart, respectively. The story saw the trio deal with an attempted alien invasion via a technologically advanced amusement park. The story was well-received enough to warrant a sequel, The Ghosts of N-Space, in 1996. It was also novelised by Virgin Books in 1994. The latter story was the final performance of Pertwee as the Third Doctor prior to his death in the same year. In 1994, BBC Radio 4 in part of the series "Whatever Happened to ..?" broadcast a comedy drama entitled Whatever Happened to Susan Foreman?, which gave a tongue-in-cheek style story detailing aspects of character Susan Foreman's history.

== 1990s productions ==
=== Audio Visuals and Big Finish Productions ===
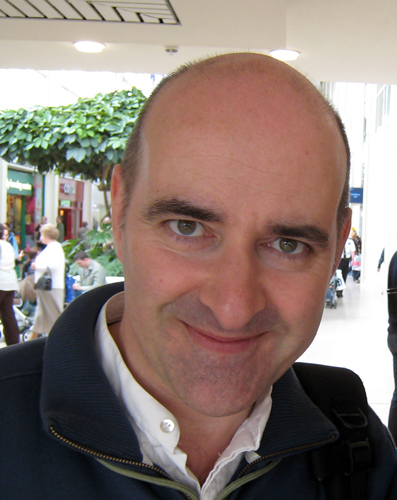
Nicholas Briggs, as pictured in 2008, was an important member behind the founding of Big Finish Productions

During the 1980s, a group of fans, including Nicholas Briggs, began to produce unlicensed audio dramas called the Audio Visuals. Four "seasons" were released between 1985 and 1991, which starred Briggs as the Doctor. Fueled by the lack of Doctor Who produced during its 1985 hiatus year, the Audio Visuals produced adventures in an attempt to fill the gap. Following the show's return, a lack of satisfaction with on-screen adventures resulted in a continuation of the Audio Visuals. The Audio Visuals were highly popular with fans, and circulated amongst many of the show's fan clubs during the 1980s. During the 1990s, Briggs, alongside Gary Russell, went to the BBC and obtained the license for Doctor Who, allowing them to produce Doctor Who audio dramas officially. Briggs wrote their first official release, The Sirens of Time, which was released in 1999. Briggs and Russell roped in many writers for other Doctor Who spin-off material to help with the project, and the group eventually evolved into the company Big Finish Productions.

Following The Sirens of Time, monthly productions were released starring Peter Davison, Colin Baker, and Sylvester McCoy as their on-screen roles as the Fifth, Sixth, and Seventh Doctors, respectively. In 2001, Paul McGann reprised his role in new stories featuring his on-screen role of the Eighth Doctor for the first time since his appearance in the 1996 TV movie Doctor Who. Further stories were produced over the subsequent years, alternating between stories featuring the Fifth, Sixth, and Seventh Doctors and new stories continuing the Eighth Doctor's story following the events of the TV movie. During this time, higher-ups at the BBC allegedly "had no idea about the existence of Big Finish". Following the Doctor Who's revival in 2005, Big Finish's stories ended up adapting a story style similar to that of the revival, and Briggs ended up being cast in the revival as the voice of multiple antagonists, including the Daleks, Cybermen, and Judoon. Elements of Big Finish's audios were also be adapted into the revival in-turn, most notably through the direct adaptation of 2003 audio drama Jubilee into the 2005 episode "Dalek". In 2007, Big Finish partnered with BBC 7 on a number of new audio plays for radio broadcast, as well as re-publishing a number of old audio plays on radio.

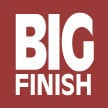
The logo for Big Finish Productions as seen in 2021

In 2012, Tom Baker reprised his role as the Fourth Doctor for Big Finish, and in 2015, elements from the show's revival were permitted for use in Big Finish audio productions, allowing for audio dramas based on elements such as the character River Song and spin-off series Torchwood to be produced. David Tennant and Billie Piper also reprised their on-screen roles of the Tenth Doctor and Rose Tyler, respectively, for further audio dramas, with other actors from the revival to reprise the part in Big Finish including John Hurt as the War Doctor in 2015, Derek Jacobi as his incarnation of antagonist the Master in 2017, Christopher Eccleston as the Ninth Doctor in 2020, Jo Martin and Sacha Dhawan as the Fugitive Doctor and Dhawan's incarnation of the Master, respectively, in 2022, and Jodie Whittaker and Mandip Gill as the Thirteenth Doctor and Yasmin Khan, respectively, in 2024. Since its inception, Big Finish had engaged in a number of other audio series based on the franchise, which include adaptations of unmade episodes and other media such as comic strips, an alternate version of the series titled Doctor Who Unbound, series focusing on supporting characters such as Henry Gordon Jago and George Litefoot and the Paternoster Gang, and spin-off productions focusing on their own original creations. The license for Big Finish Productions has been renewed until 2035, guaranteeing further productions until then.

=== BBV Productions ===
The Audio Visuals was initially founded by fan Bill Baggs, who, in the early 1990s, split off from the group to produce his own company, BBV Productions. A number of these productions, particularly from 1997 onwards, were done in audio format, and though some were officially licensed by the BBC, many were not. BBV Productions produced a number of stories featuring Doctor Who characters, including K9, The Rani, the Sontarans, and the Zygons, taking advantage of the fact their copyrights were not owned by the BBC, Doctor Who's parent company, but rather the individual writers who had initially created them. BBV also adapted the spin-off series Faction Paradox in some of its audios, and a number of audio dramas were produced for The Stranger, which starred McCoy and Sophie Aldred in roles greatly resembling but ultimately distinct from their appearances in Doctor Who. The BBC was greatly displeased by the BBV and Baggs, and when granting the license to Big Finish, included a clause that meant Baggs could never participate in production of Big Finish's audio dramas.

== Other productions ==
=== Death Comes to Time ===
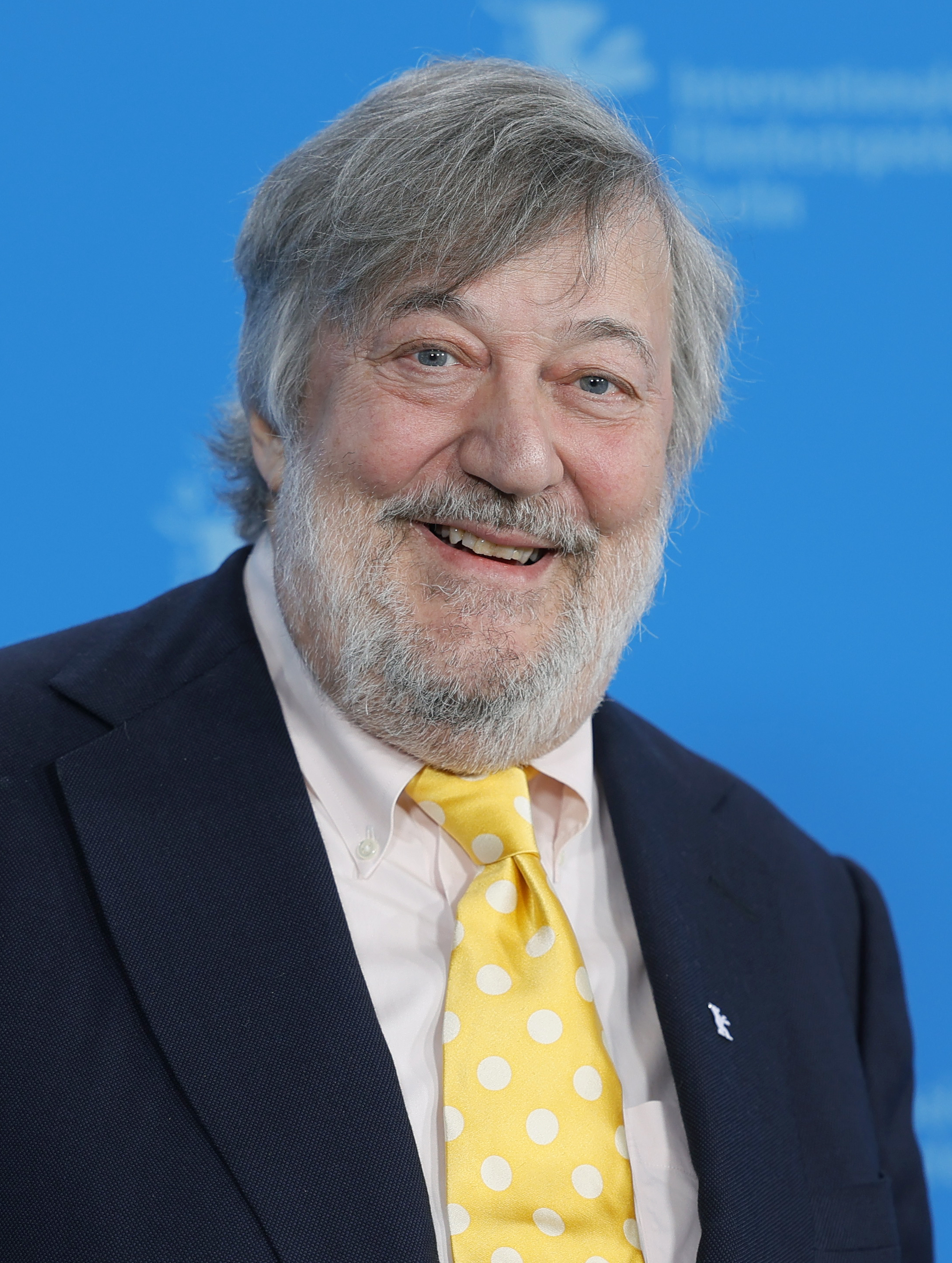
Stephen Fry (pictured in 2024) portrayed the Minister of Chance, who gained his own spin-off series following the publication of Death Comes to Time

Death Comes to Time is a 2001 audio drama produced by the BBC and released on BBC Online. Released as part of a webcast, the story attempts to create a final adventure for the Seventh Doctor and his companion Ace. The story notably deviates greatly from established canon, with the Doctor being depicted as an omnipotent ruler of the Time Lords, his people, with the Time Lords being capable of altering space and time on a whim. One of his enemies in the story, the Minister of Chance, portrayed by Stephen Fry, was featured in his own original line of audio dramas following this story's release. Death Comes to Time was BBC Online's first drama production and the first officially published Doctor Who material released by the BBC itself since the TV movie. The story notably killed off the Seventh Doctor, contradicting the television movie which depicts the character's on-screen demise.

=== The Nest Cottage Chronicles ===
In 2009, Tom Baker agreed to reprise his role as the Fourth Doctor for a series of audio plays released directly to CD by the BBC titled Hornets' Nest, which was written by writer Paul Magrs. Two other series of audio dramas starring Baker, titled Demon Quest and Serpent Crest, was later released. This was the first time Baker reprised his role for audio, barring audiobook releases, since he stopped appearing on-screen. Another audio release, The Winged Coven, was later released in 2019, serving as a sequel to the prior three installments.

=== Torchwood audio productions ===
A number of Torchwood audio productions were released on radio. The first of these, Lost Souls, was released in 2008 to celebrate BBC Radio 4's "Big Bang Day", a day of special programming commemorating the switch-on of the Large Hadron Collider at CERN. CERN was involved in the production of Lost Souls from its inception; according to writer Joseph Lidster, "they're apparently big Torchwood fans." Representatives from CERN read the script to check for scientific accuracy; they also approved the plot, which required "that if the team were going to CERN, something had to go wrong". However, James Gillies, director of communications for CERN, wrote in an article for Radio 4's website, "The CERN of reality bears little resemblance to that of Joseph Lidster's Torchwood script." According to John Barrowman, Lost Souls was the most downloaded radio or television that day on the BBC's iPlayer site. Three further radio episodes, Asylum, Golden Age, and The Dead Line, were released throughout 2009, and were later released on CD.

Three radio plays, Torchwood: The Lost Files, were produced in 2011 to promote the then-upcoming release of Torchwood: Miracle Day. Initially published on BBC Radio 4 and under three parts— "The Devil and Miss Carew", "Submission" and "House of the Dead"— Lost Files was later released on CD and iTunes. These radio dramas were notably popular due to including character Ianto Jones, who had been killed off in the television series Torchwood: Children of Earth. Ianto's presence, and the expansion of his relationship with protagonist Jack Harkness, was credited as significantly boosting listenership. Additionally boosting listenership was concern about Miracle Day's production, as many fans were hesitant about the new American production team and thus flocked to the British-produced radio dramas. This resulted in a significantly higher yield of listeners than prior Torchwood radio dramas.

=== Doctor Who: Redacted ===
In 2022, BBC Sounds broadcast Doctor Who: Redacted, a 10-episode podcast written by Juno Dawson and starring Charlie Craggs, Lois Chimimba, and Holly Quin-Ankrah. Jodie Whittaker also appears, reprising her role as the Thirteenth Doctor from the television series. The story stars a group of three queer women— Cleo, Abby, and Shawna— who host a paranormal conspiracy podcast called "The Blue Box Files", with the trio aiming to track down the truth behind the TARDIS, running into a number of established characters while also dealing with struggles in their personal lives along the way. A second, six-episode season aired in late 2023 with Dawson once again writing the show and Craggs, Chimimba, and Holly Quin-Ankrah returning to reprise their parts. The Sarah Jane Adventures actors Alexander Armstrong and Anjli Mohindra join the second-season cast, reprising their roles as Mr. Smith and Rani Chandra, respectively.

== Reception and legacy ==
During a gap year in the show in 1985, the release of Slipback was described by critic John Kenneth Muir as receiving an unusually highly positive reception from fans due to the lack of content for the series being produced. Later productions created during the 1990s similarly garnered high ratings due to the lack of official Doctor Who content, and the later production of Death Comes to Time was done by the BBC in part due to the knowledge there was a large fanbase ready to listen to it. Due to a lack of Doctor Who content and a discontent with the content aired following Slipback's release, many fan-made audio productions were produced. Many became long running and highly popular; Doctor Who Audio Dramas, for example, has claimed to garner nearly 70,000 downloads a month. The Audio Visuals, similarly, were founded in response to Slipback's release, and garnered a strong response with fans. Up to 600 tapes were produced by the group per adventure, which was high for a non-profit fan project.

Big Finish Productions' audio dramas were similarly well received by fans. Bleeding Cool author Adi Tantimedh described the audios as being largely for fans and commented that their high quality and ability to draw from a diverse array of source material allowed them be a popular option for fans of the series. Big Finish's stories were described by the book Adaptation in Contemporary Culture: Textual Infidelities as being an influence on the tone of the show's 2005 revival, most notably through the adaptation of Jubilee into the on-screen episode "Dalek".

== See also ==
- List of Doctor Who: The Classic Series audio plays by Big Finish
- List of Doctor Who: The New Series audio plays by Big Finish
- List of The Worlds of Doctor Who audio plays by Big Finish
