= Penrith Town Hall =

Municipal building in Penrith, Cumbria, England

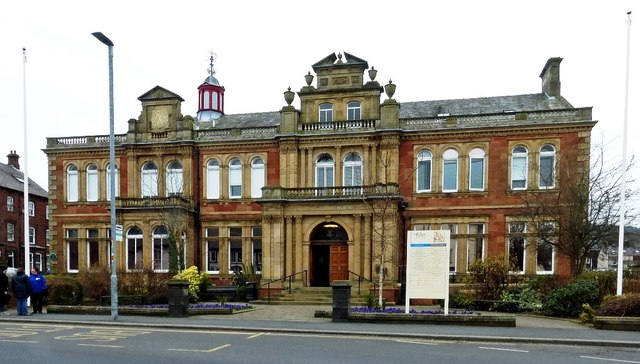
- Penrith Town Hall

- Shown in Cumbria
- 54.6667°N 2.7544°W
- Location: Corney Square, Penrith

History
- Built: 1906

Site notes
- Architect: J. J. Knewstub
- Architectural style: Renaissance Revival style

Listed Building – Grade II
- Official name: Penrith Town Hall
- Designated: 25 July 2014
- Reference no.: 1420806

Penrith Town Hall is a municipal building in Corney Square, Penrith, Cumbria, England. The structure, which was the headquarters of Eden District Council, is a Grade II listed building.

== History ==
The current building has its origins in a pair of identical, late 18th century, neoclassical style houses; the left hand building was once occupied by a local clinician, Dr Livingstone, and the right hand house was once occupied by the former East Indiaman commander, John Wordsworth, who was a cousin of the poet, William Wordsworth.

Following significant population growth, largely associated with the status of Penrith as a market town, the area became an urban district in 1895. The new civic leaders decided to acquire the two buildings and to combine them into a single municipal structure. The Scottish-American industrialist and philanthropist, Andrew Carnegie, made a contribution of £1,200 towards the cost of the construction to support the inclusion of a public library. Progress was temporarily delayed when it was thought, incorrectly, that the houses had been designed by Robert Adam: nevertheless, following the intervention of Canon Hardwicke Rawnsley, much of the interiors of the two houses was retained.

The new structure was designed by the district surveyor, J. J. Knewstub, in the Renaissance Revival style, built in red sandstone from Lazonby with buff sandstone dressings from Stanton Moor and was completed in 1906. The design involved an asymmetrical main frontage with six bays facing onto Corney Square. The second bay on the left, which slightly projected forward, featured a pair of round headed windows on the ground floor flanked by Corinthian order pilasters supporting an entablature and a balustrade; there were two round headed windows on the first floor separated by a Corinthian order column and flanked by Corinthian order pilasters supporting a modillioned cornice and, at roof level, there was a blind dormer containing a panel bearing the coat of arms of the town. The fourth bay on the left, which was also elaborate and also slightly projected forward, featured a short flight of steps leading up to a doorway with a fanlight flanked by pairs of Corinthian order columns and, beyond that, Corinthian order pilasters supporting an entablature inscribed with the words "Town Hall" and a balustrade; there were two round headed windows on the first floor flanked by columns and pilasters supporting a modillioned cornice and, at roof level, there was a dormer window with a broken pediment and a pair of urns. The other bays contained three-light windows on both floors. Internally, the principal room was the council chamber on the first floor.

The new public library was established in a wing on the northwest side of the town hall at the same time that the main building opened, and the Penrith Museum, which had been founded in 1894, also moved into the town hall at that time.

On 8 June 1920, the town hall was the venue for the coroner's inquiry into the death of the soldier, Percy Toplis, who was alleged to have taken part in the Étaples mutiny and who later became known as the Monocled Mutineer; the verdict of the jury was that his death in a gunfight with police was justifiable homicide. During the Second World War staff in the town hall administered the accommodation arrangements for the many thousands of people evacuated from the south east to Cumberland and Westmorland and a civil defence reporting centre was also established in the basement.

The town hall continued to serve as the headquarters of the urban district council for much of the 20th century and remained the local seat of government after the enlarged Eden District Council which was formed in 1974. The museum moved out of the town hall to the Robinson's School Building in Middlegate in July 1985 and the public library moved out of the town hall to facilities previously occupied by the Queen Elizabeth Grammar School in St Andrew's Churchyard in 1992. The registrar's office also moved out of the town hall to the library, which then became an approved venue for weddings and civil partnership ceremonies, in 2015.

In January 2018, the council considered a plan to erect a modern extension on a car park at the rear of the site. This was not implemented. Then, in March 2021, the council appointed consultants to develop an alternative proposal involving the redevelopment of the town hall as a creative asset. However, in May 2021 the council also decided to grant the building community asset status, so giving the community the right to acquire the building if it ever came to be offered for sale.

The building ceased to be the local seat of government on 1 April 2023, when Eden District Council was abolished and its functions transferred to the new authority, Westmorland and Furness Council. The building continued to house some offices of the new council until June 2024, when the council moved its Penrith-based staff and services to Voreda House, a refurbished office building behind the town hall.

== See also ==
- Listed buildings in Penrith, Cumbria
