= Peter de Loughry =

Irish politician (1868–1931)

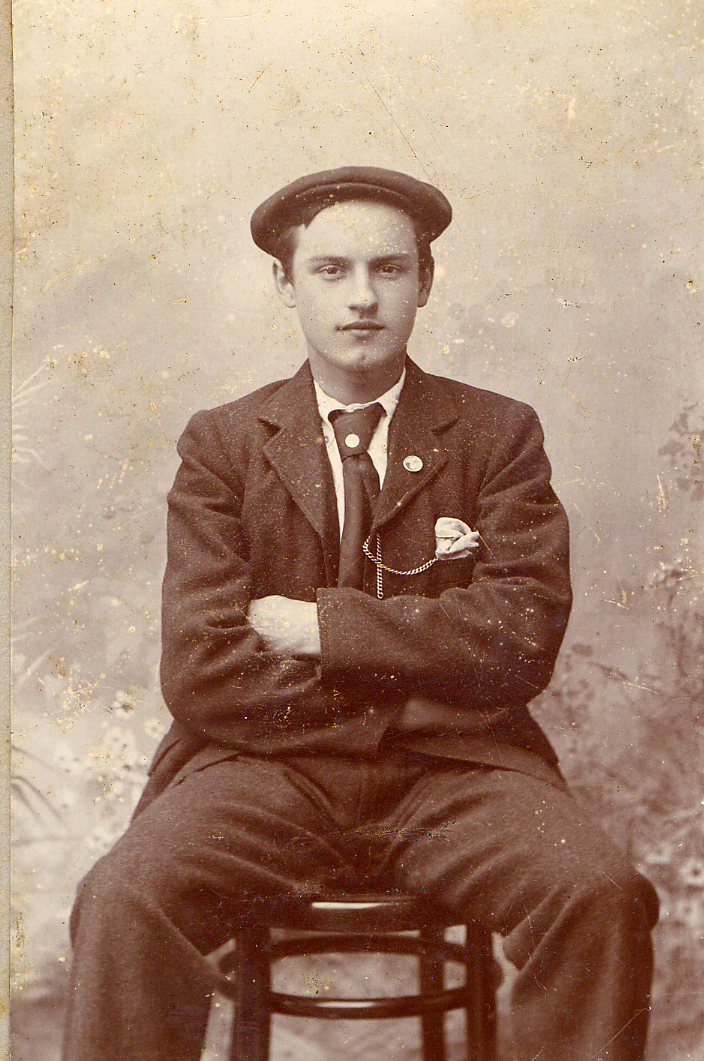
- De Loughry, c. 1910s

Teachta Dála
- In office September 1927 – 23 October 1931
- Constituency: Carlow–Kilkenny

Senator
- In office 11 December 1922 – 17 September 1925

Personal details
- Born: 1883 Kilkenny, Ireland
- Died: 23 October 1931 (aged 47–48) Dublin, Ireland
- Party: Cumann na nGaedheal
- Spouse: Winifred Murphy (m. 1911)

Military service
- Branch/service: Irish Volunteers; Irish Republican Army
- Battles/wars: Irish War of Independence

Peter de Loughry (or Deloughry; 1883 – 23 October 1931) was an Irish nationalist and politician, who was a leadership figure in Kilkenny city in the early 20th century.

== Background ==
De Loughry married Winifred Murphy in 1911. Winifred would share her husband's political agenda, and would become president of Cumann na mBan in County Kilkenny during the Irish Revolutionary period.

== Leading the IRB in Kilkenny ==
De Loughry was a committed Irish nationalist long even before the events of the 1916 Easter Rising, which would spark a surge of support in Ireland for Nationalism in its wake. In 1912 the Irish Republican Brotherhood (IRB), the Irish nationalist secret society, decided to try and re-establish a chapter of its organisation in Kilkenny City, and it was de Loughry who became the primary organiser of the chapter.

== Irish Volunteers ==
On 5 March 1914, a company of Irish Volunteers was established in Kilkenny City. The Irish Volunteers were a paramilitary force created in response to the creation of the Ulster Volunteers. The Ulster Volunteers were a force created to violently resist the creation of an All-Ireland Parliament in the event of Home Rule being granted to Ireland by the British Government. The Irish Volunteers, in the event the Ulster Volunteers moved to do this, would have attempted to counteract them. However, in mid-1914 there was a split in the Irish Volunteers when John Redmond, leader of the Irish Parliamentary Party, called upon the Irish Volunteers to join the British Army and serve in World War I. This move was strongly and vocally opposed by the most radical nationalists among the Volunteers, among them the IRB. Those volunteers who followed Redmond's call took on the name National Volunteers while those who refused to join the British Army retained the name Irish Volunteers.

In Kilkenny in September 1914, de Loughly approached an assembly of Volunteers and asked those who rejected Redmond to leave their ranks and join him. Thomas Treacy, who witnessed this, described the event:

Peter DeLoughry then called on all those who stood for Ireland and the Green flag to fall out and line up at a point indicated by him...and all those who stood for England and the Union Jack to stand where they were. Twenty-eight men left the ranks and lined up at the point indicated...the balance on parade (over 600) stood on the Redmondite side

— Thomas Treacy, The War of Independence in County Kilkenny: Conflict, Politics and People

As demonstrated by the small numbers who switched over to de Loughry, previous to 1916 the Irish Parliamentary Party remained extremely strong in County Kilkenny, partially because the Redmond family who led the IPP were based in County Waterford, which directly borders County Kilkenny.

Nonetheless, de Loughry pressed on with his radical Nationalist agenda. By 1916 those Volunteers in Kilkenny who had taken the anti-Redmond stance consolidated around de Loughry. De Loughry who ran a garage in Kilkenny city, converted part of it into a foundry and arsenal and began producing homemade grenades. The garage also meant De Loughry had easy access to vehicles, meaning he was able to provide transport and quick communication for his organisations.

== Easter Rising ==
In the spring of 1916, Irish Nationalists conspired to launch a rebellion against British rule in Ireland, a plan which would eventually ferment as the Easter Rising. In the weeks directly before the rising, agents were sent to Kilkenny to make this plan known. Cathal Brugha, himself an IRB member, arrived in Kilkenny and told local Nationalists to gather arms and prepare for the arrival of J. J. "Ginger" O'Connell, who was to act as their commander.

When the Easter Rising started the Kilkenny company gathered each day and was ready to act. However, in the chaos surround Easter Rising, with different counties being sent conflicting information about whether the Rising was "on" or "called off", the Kilkenny company was unsure how to proceed. Ultimately they did not attack any Royal Irish Constabulary units. Nonetheless, in the aftermath of the rising Ginger O'Connell was arrested and so was De Loughry, and over 1,000 British Army soldiers were stationed in Kilkenny.

== War of Independence ==
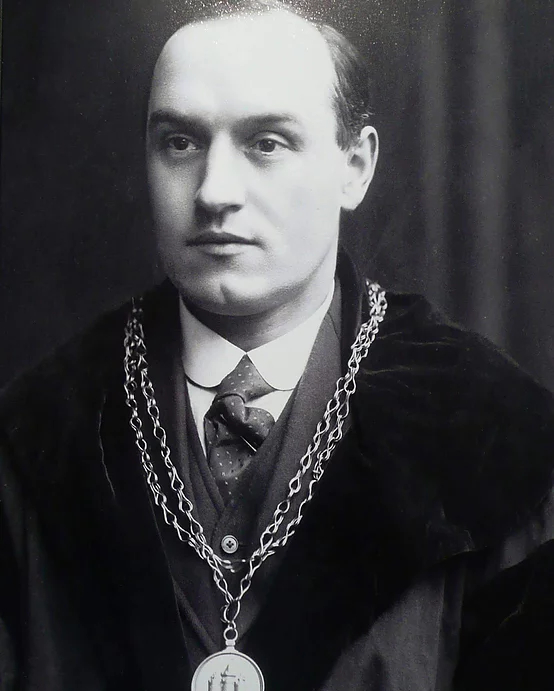
De Loughry as Mayor of Kilkenny

In 1919, while still in prison, de Loughry was elected Mayor of Kilkenny, an office he would retain until 1925. He was also briefly Brigade Commandant of the Irish Republican Army army units in Kilkenny until he was once again arrested by British authorities.

=== Freeing de Valera ===
By the start of 1919, the British had several important nationalist figures arrested and imprisoned in Lincoln Gaol, England. Among them were Seán Milroy, Seán McGarry and most prominently of all, Éamon de Valera. De Loughry joined them when he too was sent to the prison. A number of attempts were made to break these men out of the prison using forged keys, but all of these failed until de Loughry was asked for help. De Loughry was able to use his metalworking skills to forge a master key that was subsequently used in the successful escape of the other three from the prison, an event considered a major political and military coup for the nationalists against the British. De Loughry remained behind as his release date was just a few weeks away regardless.

During the Irish Civil War, de Loughry was in favour of the terms of the Anglo-Irish Treaty, leading him subsequently to joining Cumann na nGaedheal.

== Post-war period ==
He was elected to the Irish Free State Seanad in 1922, but lost his seat at the 1925 election. He was elected to Dáil Éireann as a Cumann na nGaedheal Teachta Dála (TD) for the Carlow–Kilkenny constituency at the September 1927 general election. He died in office on 23 October 1931; no by-election was held for his seat.

A book about him called Peter's Key was published in 2012. The book recounts the story his involvement in the plot to free Éamon de Valera from Lincoln Gaol during the Irish War of Independence. During and after the escape from prison de Loughry remained the Mayor of Kilkenny, a position he held for six consecutive years.

Dáil	Election	Deputy (Party)	Deputy (Party)	Deputy (Party)	Deputy (Party)	Deputy (Party)
2nd	1921	Edward Aylward (SF)	W. T. Cosgrave (SF)	James Lennon (SF)	Gearóid O'Sullivan (SF)	4 seats 1921–1923
3rd	1922	Patrick Gaffney (Lab)	W. T. Cosgrave (PT-SF)	Denis Gorey (FP)	Gearóid O'Sullivan (PT-SF)	4 seats 1921–1923
4th	1923	Edward Doyle (Lab)	W. T. Cosgrave (CnaG)	Denis Gorey (FP)	Michael Shelly (Rep)	Seán Gibbons (CnaG)
4th	1925 by-election	Edward Doyle (Lab)	W. T. Cosgrave (CnaG)	Denis Gorey (FP)	Michael Shelly (Rep)	Thomas Bolger (CnaG)
5th	1927 (Jun)	Edward Doyle (Lab)	W. T. Cosgrave (CnaG)	Denis Gorey (CnaG)	Thomas Derrig (FF)	Richard Holohan (FP)
6th	1927 (Sep)	Edward Doyle (Lab)	W. T. Cosgrave (CnaG)	Peter de Loughry (CnaG)	Thomas Derrig (FF)	Richard Holohan (FP)
6th	1927 by-election	Edward Doyle (Lab)	Denis Gorey (CnaG)	Peter de Loughry (CnaG)	Thomas Derrig (FF)	Richard Holohan (FP)
7th	1932	Francis Humphreys (FF)	Denis Gorey (CnaG)	Desmond FitzGerald (CnaG)	Thomas Derrig (FF)	Seán Gibbons (FF)
8th	1933	James Pattison (Lab)	Richard Holohan (NCP)	Desmond FitzGerald (CnaG)	Thomas Derrig (FF)	Seán Gibbons (FF)
9th	1937	Constituency abolished. See Kilkenny and Carlow–Kildare				

Dáil	Election	Deputy (Party)	Deputy (Party)	Deputy (Party)	Deputy (Party)	Deputy (Party)
13th	1948	James Pattison (NLP)	Thomas Walsh (FF)	Thomas Derrig (FF)	Joseph Hughes (FG)	Patrick Crotty (FG)
14th	1951	Francis Humphreys (FF)	Thomas Walsh (FF)	Thomas Derrig (FF)	Joseph Hughes (FG)	Patrick Crotty (FG)
15th	1954	James Pattison (Lab)	Thomas Walsh (FF)	Thomas Derrig (FF)	Joseph Hughes (FG)	Patrick Crotty (FG)
15th	1956 by-election	James Pattison (Lab)	Martin Medlar (FF)	Thomas Derrig (FF)	Joseph Hughes (FG)	Patrick Crotty (FG)
16th	1957	Francis Humphreys (FF)	Martin Medlar (FF)	Jim Gibbons (FF)	Joseph Hughes (FG)	Patrick Crotty (FG)
16th	1960 by-election	Patrick Teehan (FF)	Martin Medlar (FF)	Jim Gibbons (FF)	Joseph Hughes (FG)	Patrick Crotty (FG)
17th	1961	Séamus Pattison (Lab)	Martin Medlar (FF)	Jim Gibbons (FF)	Desmond Governey (FG)	Patrick Crotty (FG)
18th	1965	Séamus Pattison (Lab)	Tom Nolan (FF)	Jim Gibbons (FF)	Desmond Governey (FG)	Patrick Crotty (FG)
19th	1969	Séamus Pattison (Lab)	Tom Nolan (FF)	Jim Gibbons (FF)	Desmond Governey (FG)	Kieran Crotty (FG)
20th	1973	Séamus Pattison (Lab)	Tom Nolan (FF)	Jim Gibbons (FF)	Desmond Governey (FG)	Kieran Crotty (FG)
21st	1977	Séamus Pattison (Lab)	Tom Nolan (FF)	Jim Gibbons (FF)	Liam Aylward (FF)	Kieran Crotty (FG)
22nd	1981	Séamus Pattison (Lab)	Tom Nolan (FF)	Desmond Governey (FG)	Liam Aylward (FF)	Kieran Crotty (FG)
23rd	1982 (Feb)	Séamus Pattison (Lab)	Jim Gibbons (FF)	Desmond Governey (FG)	Liam Aylward (FF)	Kieran Crotty (FG)
24th	1982 (Nov)	Séamus Pattison (Lab)	M. J. Nolan (FF)	Dick Dowling (FG)	Liam Aylward (FF)	Kieran Crotty (FG)
25th	1987	Séamus Pattison (Lab)	M. J. Nolan (FF)	Martin Gibbons (PDs)	Liam Aylward (FF)	Kieran Crotty (FG)
26th	1989	Séamus Pattison (Lab)	M. J. Nolan (FF)	Phil Hogan (FG)	Liam Aylward (FF)	John Browne (FG)
27th	1992	Séamus Pattison (Lab)	M. J. Nolan (FF)	Phil Hogan (FG)	Liam Aylward (FF)	John Browne (FG)
28th	1997	Séamus Pattison (Lab)	John McGuinness (FF)	Phil Hogan (FG)	Liam Aylward (FF)	John Browne (FG)
29th	2002	Séamus Pattison (Lab)	John McGuinness (FF)	Phil Hogan (FG)	Liam Aylward (FF)	M. J. Nolan (FF)
30th	2007	Mary White (GP)	John McGuinness (FF)	Phil Hogan (FG)	Bobby Aylward (FF)	M. J. Nolan (FF)
31st	2011	Ann Phelan (Lab)	John McGuinness (FF)	Phil Hogan (FG)	John Paul Phelan (FG)	Pat Deering (FG)
31st	2015 by-election	Ann Phelan (Lab)	John McGuinness (FF)	Bobby Aylward (FF)	John Paul Phelan (FG)	Pat Deering (FG)
32nd	2016	Kathleen Funchion (SF)	John McGuinness (FF)	Bobby Aylward (FF)	John Paul Phelan (FG)	Pat Deering (FG)
33rd	2020	Kathleen Funchion (SF)	John McGuinness (FF)	Jennifer Murnane O'Connor (FF)	John Paul Phelan (FG)	Malcolm Noonan (GP)
34th	2024	Natasha Newsome Drennan (SF)	John McGuinness (FF)	Jennifer Murnane O'Connor (FF)	Catherine Callaghan (FG)	Peter "Chap" Cleere (FF)
