= Flag of Cumberland =

Flag of English historic county

Cumberland
- Proportion: 3:5
- Adopted: 13 December 2012

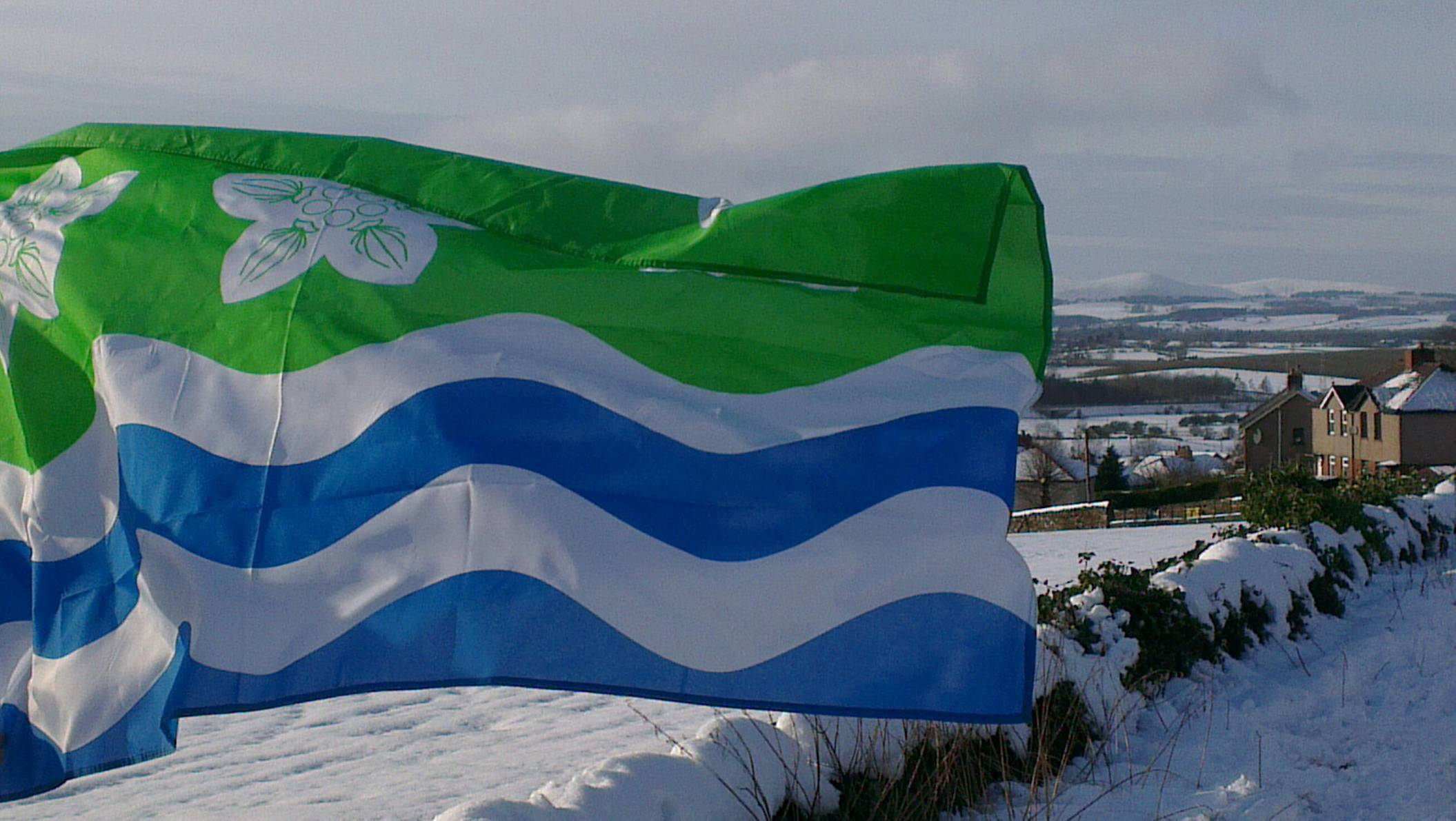
The Cumberland flag at Beacon Edge, Penrith

The Cumberland flag is used to represent the historic county of Cumberland, England. It is closely modelled on the banner of arms of the coat of arms of the defunct Cumberland County Council, which were granted to the council by the College of Arms on 19 September 1950.

The flag has a green field, with three parnassus flowers in the upper half and four wavy bands of alternating blue and white in the lower half. The blazon, or heraldic description of the arms, is per fesse Vert and barry wavy of four Argent and Azure in chief three parnassus flowers Proper.

The flag was registered with the Flag Institute, a charity which promotes vexillology, in December 2012. It states that the green field and parnassus flowers represent Cumberland's marshy uplands and plains, and that the blue and silver stripes in base represent the coastline, lakes, and fells.

The flag has been flown around Cumberland, including at Penrith Town Hall, Wordsworth House in Cockermouth, and at the Cumberland Show. It was also waved by members of the crowd when Charles, then Prince of Wales, visited the Rheged Centre near Penrith in 2015. The flag was flown outside the offices of the Department of Communities and Local Government in 2013 to celebrate Cumberland Day.

== Design ==
The flag has a green field, with three parnassus flowers in the upper half and four wavy bands of alternating blue and white in the lower half. The blazon, or heraldic description of the arms, is per fesse Vert and barry wavy of four Argent and Azure in chief three parnassus flowers Proper. It is in a 3:5 ratio.

=== Colours ===
The colours on the flag are:

Scheme	Green	Blue	White
Pantone (Paper)	354 C	300 C	White
Web colours	#00B140	#005EB8	#FFFFFF
RGB	0, 177, 64	0, 94, 184	255, 255, 255
CMYK	100%, 0%, 64%, 31%	100%, 49%, 0%, 28%	0%, 0%, 0%, 0%

== History ==
The flag is based on the banner of arms of the now-defunct Cumberland County Council, which were granted to the council by the College of Arms on 19 September 1950.

Various local organisations supported the registration of the Cumberland flag, including local sports clubs and civic societies, as well as parish councils. During the registration process, the Flag Institute requested that the waves and Parnassus flowers be restyled to improve the design of the flag. The local designer of the flag Philip Tibbetts redrew the Parnassus flowers from images of the actual plant and tidied up their arrangement. The colours that were chosen were supposed to match the arms as closely as possible, with the green being the same as the green on the flag of Wales, stemming from Cumberland's etymology in ‘Cymru-land’, or ‘land of the Welsh’.

The registration occurred following these changes in December 2012, and the institute stated that the green field and parnassus flowers represent Cumberland's marshy uplands and plains, and that the blue and silver stripes in base represent the coastline, lakes, and fells.

=== Use ===
The flag has been flown around Cumberland, including at Penrith Town Hall, Wordsworth House in Cockermouth, and at the Cumberland Show. It was also waved by members of the crowd when Charles, then Prince of Wales, visited the Rheged Centre near Penrith in 2015. The flag was flown outside the offices of the Department of Communities and Local Government in 2013 to celebrate Cumberland Day.
