= Percy Toplis =

British criminal

Percy Toplis in military uniform, as printed in the Nottingham Evening Post

Francis Percy Toplis (22 August 1896 – 6 June 1920) was an English criminal and imposter active during and after the First World War. Before the war he was imprisoned for attempted rape. During the war he served as a private in the Royal Army Medical Corps, but regularly posed as an officer while on leave, wearing a monocle. After the war he became notorious following the murder of a taxi driver and the wounding of a police officer who attempted to apprehend him. The manhunt was major news at the time. He was tracked down and killed in a gunfight with police.

In 1978 a book was published which claimed that he had a large part in the Étaples Mutiny from 9–12 September 1917, as "The Monocled Mutineer". The authors suggested that he was pursued by the political establishment in a vendetta and may have been innocent of the murder. The book was dramatised by the BBC in 1986 as The Monocled Mutineer, creating considerable controversy.

Critics say that there is no evidence he was present and that official records show that Toplis's unit was en route to India during the Étaples mutiny. However, the official records that are often cited to refute claims that Toplis took part in the Mutiny have been extrapolated from a summary of his movements that appear in a letter addressed to the Chief Constable of Hampshire Police from Superintendent James L. Cox. The letter, dated 17 May 1920, describes how Toplis was deployed to the Dardanelles after the outset of war in 1915 with a Field Ambulance Company, was wounded and sent home and "then went on trooping duty to Salonika, Egypt and back to the Depot and then to India in the troopship Orontes". However, the letter from Superintendent Cox makes no mention of a 'wanted notice' that featured in the Police Gazette dated 18 October 1918 which states that Toplis deserted from Salonika on 15 June that same year. The six-month 'hard labour' sentence served on him by the Nottingham magistrate in December 1918 suggests Toplis did not see out his service days in Egypt or Bombay as some have alleged. As Toplis's British Army Service Records have not been retained by the MOD, precise details about his movements remain unclear. With the exception of Cox's letter and a Medal Card, no other official records of his service history exist. Despite the omission of actual dates in Superintendent Cox's summary of his movements during the war, many historians feel it is unlikely that Toplis was in France to participate in the mutiny.

== Early life ==
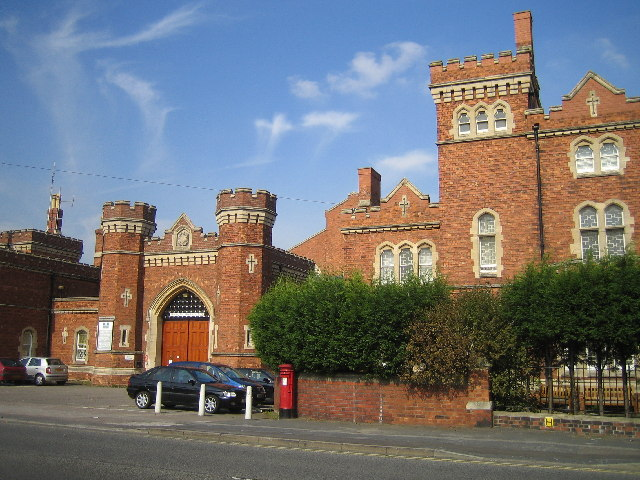
Lincoln Prison where Toplis served his sentence 1912–1914

Toplis was born at Sanforth Street, Chesterfield, Derbyshire and christened on 25 September 1896 at Skegby. His parents, Herbert and Rejoice Elizabeth (née Webster), were unable to support him and he was raised by his grandparents.

He was educated at South Normanton Elementary School, where he was reportedly an unruly bully who was frequently caned. In March 1908, aged 11, he was birched for acquiring two suits using false pretences. His grandparents were no longer able to control him and the court released him to his aunt, Annie Webster. Toplis left school in 1910 aged 13, and became a blacksmith's apprentice at the Blackwell colliery, but after a poor attendance record and an argument with the pit manager he took to an itinerant life in Scotland. In 1911 he was sentenced to ten days imprisonment in Dumfries for the non-payment of two train tickets. He returned to England and in 1912 it is alleged that aged 15, Toplis was sentenced to two years hard labour for the attempted rape of 15-year-old farmer's daughter Nellie North at Sutton-on-Sea in Lincolnshire, serving his sentence in Lincoln Prison and released in 1914. However, while Toplis's name is entered in the records of the Quarter Sessions for the assault on Nellie North, the Boston Guardian of 9 March reports that the man charged at Alford Police Station was a man named James Topliss. It was reported that Topliss had followed the girl past Brown's Farm and assaulted her at a railway crossing. After her ordeal the girl was examined at a surgery in Mablethorpe where signs of "force and violence were found." When apprehended, Topliss gave his name as William Edmundston of Sutton and alleged that he had been on his way to Skegness to visit an uncle. The Census of 1911 shows that farm labourer James Topliss was living with his 12-year-old son Walter James Topliss in nearby Withern in Alford at the time of the incident. Blackwell in Derbyshire is some 85 miles away.

== First World War ==
In 1915, the year after the outbreak of the First World War, Toplis joined the Royal Army Medical Corps and served as a stretcher bearer, his first active duty being at Loos. His unit was shipped overseas to take part in the landings at Gallipoli, and when they returned, Toplis was hospitalised for dysentery. Afterwards he briefly worked in a munitions factory. His unit was later posted to Salonika and Egypt, but Toplis was sent back when he contracted malaria. Toplis made a public revisit to Blackwell posing in the uniform of a captain. The visit and some of his anecdotes were reported by the local newspaper, the Nottingham Evening Post, who took a photograph that they later released to the police for his "wanted" notice in 1920.

== Alleged mutineer ==
In 1978 William Allison and John Fairley published The Monocled Mutineer, in which they portray Percy Toplis as a leading participant in the Étaples mutiny as a consequence of his being among a band of deserters based in that area of France. They say that Toplis was sought in France following the mutiny and posters for his arrest were issued. The fact that the British authorities went to such lengths to apprehend or silence Toplis is thought by Allison and Fairley to add credence to the view that he was one of the only leaders of the mutiny that escaped retribution.

After the book was published, Toplis's supposed career as a mutineer was dramatised by Howard Barker in his 1980 play Crimes in Hot Countries, in which he is portrayed as an irrepressibly subversive seducer, "irresponsible and amoral, with little concern as to the consequences of his action for others". The 1986 BBC series entitled The Monocled Mutineer, an adaptation by Alan Bleasdale of the book in which Toplis was played by Paul McGann, portrayed him in a much more positive light. The production fuelled accusations by the Conservative government of the time of left-wing bias at the BBC. It was not only the right-wing press who denounced the accuracy of the series and the book on which it was based; the socialist historian Julian Putkowski, originally recruited as a historical advisor to the programme, also publicly criticised the 'factual errors and misinterpretations that occur in the series'. Putkowski pointed out that it was unlikely that Toplis played any part in the mutiny.

Any conclusive evidence that Percy Toplis was involved in the Étaples mutiny might have been contained in official files kept at the UK's National Archives. However, the records from the Étaples Board of Enquiry were destroyed a long time ago because they were only required to be kept for 10 years.

== After the War ==
In August 1918, Toplis's father died and soon afterwards Percy deserted from Blackpool. He was sentenced at Nottingham Assizes to six months in prison for fraud. When released in 1920, he joined the Royal Army Service Corps and was stationed at Bulford Camp. He was soon selling rationed fuel on the black market, forging false papers to steal other soldiers' salaries and wearing a colonel's uniform when he visited women in town. He often used a gold monocle as part of his disguise.

== Murder and pursuit ==
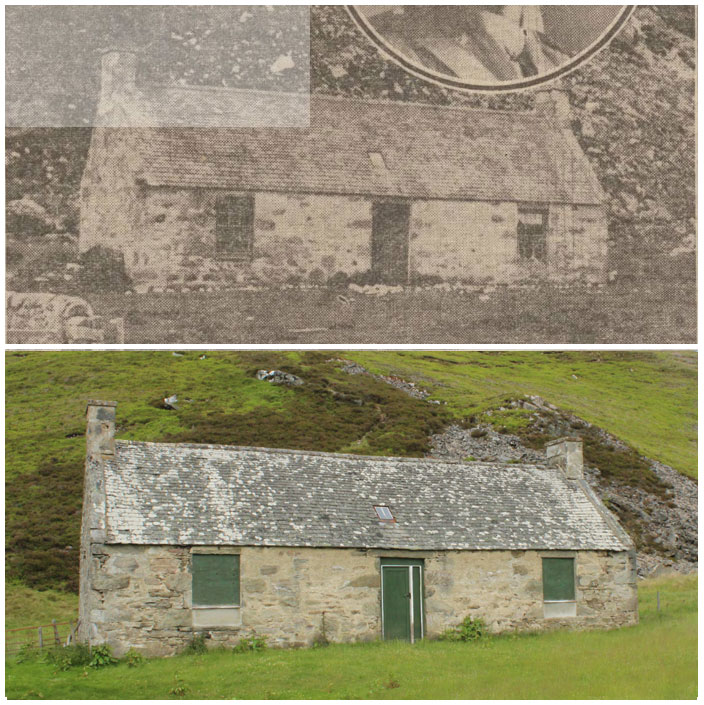
The Tomintoul bothy in which Toplis spent some of his last weeks alive

Mortuary photograph of Toplis

Toplis went AWOL again on 24 April 1920. After 9:00 p.m., taxi driver Sidney George Spicer was found dead from a gunshot wound on Thruxton Down, near Andover. Toplis was seen in Bulford Camp around 11:00 p.m. The inquest into Spicer's death took place in a barn on Thruxton Down. The jury returned a verdict of "wilful murder" by Percy Toplis, foreshadowing the possibility of his execution when caught; it was the first British inquest in modern times to declare a man guilty of murder in his absence.

Toplis spent the next couple of weeks in London posing as an officer. The police began to close in and he fled to Monmouth, Wales. According to the Dundee Courier of 7 May, a cap with Toplis's name in it was found in Pontypool, just 11 miles from Ebbw Vale. A week later there was a sighting of Toplis at a prayer meeting at the Salem Baptist Chapel in Blaina, little more than a mile from Nantyglo, the birthplace of Jesse Robert Short, the only man known to have been executed for his role in the Étaples mutiny.

A diary read at the inquest into his death suggests that Toplis arrived in Tomintoul, Scotland on 6 May. According to the People's Journal of 12 June, Toplis found work as a woodcutter on a forestry and shooting estate in Dunmaglass. The same report claims that on 11 May Toplis arrived at The Temperance Hotel in central Inverness, signing his name in the hotel register, "G. Waters". According to the owner of the hotel, the stranger mixed freely with other guests, entertaining them on the piano and explaining he had been in Russia and was now looking for a job. His repertoire included a selection of hymns and the Russian National Anthem. Within days of his arrival at the hotel, the proprietor became suspicious and confronted Toplis, putting it to him quite bluntly, "It strikes me there is a mystery about you, young man." Toplis is believed to have left the hotel on 13 May. After journeying as far afield as Muir of Ord and Lochrosque Toplis returned to the bothy in Tomintoul. On 1 June a farmer saw smoke rising from the chimney. He alerted Police Constable George Greig and together they found Toplis sitting by a fire. Toplis fired his pistol, wounding them both and then fled on a bicycle. He cycled to Aberdeen and took a train to Carlisle, where he arrived on 5 June. He was seen in an Army base in Carlisle Castle.

Around this time there was also a rumour that Toplis had fled to the Isle of Man.

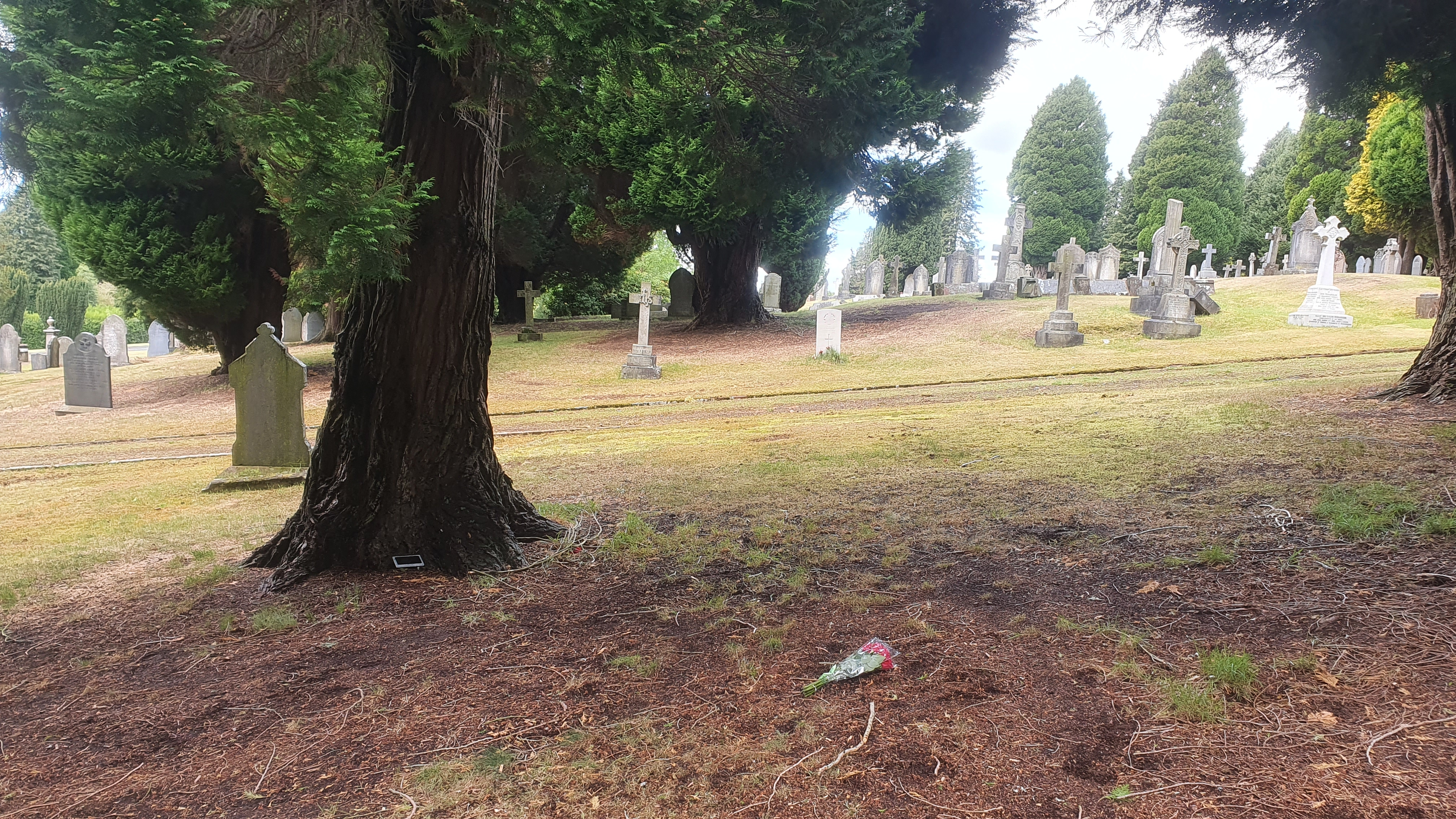
Location of Toplis's grave in Penrith Cemetery

On 6 June, in Cumberland, Police Constable Alfred Fulton met and questioned a man in "partial military dress" but let him go. Back at the station, he checked police circulars and noticed that this man matched the description of a man suspected of the Andover murder. He went back to apprehend Toplis but retreated when Toplis threatened him with a Webley Mk VI revolver. Inspector William Ritchie and Sergeant Robert Bertram, joined Fulton armed with Webley revolvers and had also disguised their uniforms. It is believed that this may have been the result of orders from the Home Office to the Chief Constable Charles de Courcy Parry. They set off by car to apprehend Toplis and were joined en route by the chief constable's civilian son, Norman de Courcy Parry, on his 1000cc motorcycle. Parry was armed with a Belgian automatic pistol, which he had brought back on his return from service during the war. They saw Toplis, north of Penrith near Plumpton, but did not recognise him until they had passed him and were some yards down the road. After quickly turning the car round, the group again approached Toplis near Romanway Farm. Norman de Courcy Parry stopped the car, feigning mechanical trouble. He exited, pretending to check the trouble, as Toplis approached. The police officers then came out and challenged Toplis, who attempted to flee and fired at them. The officers ran towards him shooting and Toplis collapsed and died. An inquest was held at Penrith Town Hall on 8 June with an immediate verdict of justifiable homicide.

On 9 June, in the presence of only police, officials of the guardians and Rev R H Law, Toplis was afforded a Christian burial service, and was hastily buried without the knowledge of his family or the media in an unmarked grave due to the crimes he was accused of committing. Until recently, the location of the grave was unknown. However, with the corroboration of media images from the time of burial and information provided from Penrith Cemetery, the location of Toplis's resting place can be located to the right of the cemetery chapel, believed to be location 77MMM 62/3. In 1980, there was an unsuccessful attempt by the Canadian Frank Dayson, a childhood friend of Toplis, to erect a headstone on the grave. A recent attempt has also been made by the descendants of Toplis to erect a headstone. However, Eden District Council are unable to sell the exclusive rights of burial due to an anticipated need to re-use the burial land where Toplis is interred.

Toplis's belongings, including his monocle, were handed to Penrith and Eden Museum, where they are on display. In 2015 a plaque was unveiled to mark the spot where Toplis was shot dead.

== Aftermath ==
Whilst local and national press were generally supportive of the level of force used by the Penrith Constabulary in apprehending Toplis, The Guardian offered a more cautionary approach. On 9 June 1920, the day that Toplis was buried, the paper wrote that although it was difficult to see how his death could have been avoided, it was "not by any means the best end that could have been put to a bad business." The paper went on to describe "several minor but interesting loose ends" that a jury might have been able to clear up.

On Saturday 8 January 1927, the body of Toplis's accomplice Harry Fallows – the only credible eyewitness to have implicated Toplis in the murder of Spicer – was found by 17-year-old rambler Fred Bannister in a cave in Winnats Pass in Castleton, Derbyshire. By his side was 17-year-old Marjorie Coe Stewart. The pair had been living at separate addresses in Moston, Manchester, some 31 miles from the scene of the tragedy. The police ruled it a double-suicide. The couple had disappeared late on New Year's Eve and were found by Bannister, also of Manchester, eight days later. Despite their appeals for witnesses, police were not able to account for the couple's movements from the time they left Manchester until the time they were found in the cave. Bannister told the press that he had seen Fallows outside the cave the previous week (1 January) and that something had prompted him to revisit the cave the following week.

Just four months after the death of Fallows in Derbyshire, the man who had led the original Toplis investigation, Superintendent James Lock Cox of the Hampshire Police, died suddenly at his home in Andover. He was 49 years old.

That same February, James Cullen, sentenced to one year's imprisonment over his role in the Étaples mutiny, published the very first account of the events in the Glasgow Weekly Herald. After serving during the war with the Argyll and Sutherland Highlanders, Cullen had deserted in January 1919 and became a founding member of the Communist Party of Great Britain. Cullen blamed seditious leaflets distributed by Bolshevik sympathisers for causing a "first rate explosion" at the camp. His account of a corporal in the Military Police shooting dead a Gordon Highlander was perfectly in keeping with the official account of the disturbances in the Étaples Base Camp diary, which were only made available to researchers in the 1970s.

In March 1927 Charles de Courcy Parry, the Chief Constable of the Cumberland and Westmorland Constabulary, was brought out of his seven-year retirement and appointed His Majesty's Inspector of Constabulary for Wales by the Conservative Home Secretary, Sir William Joynson-Hicks. Contrary to popular myth, Parry did not resign his post as Chief Constable of Westmorland as a result of the ambush on Toplis. Parry had submitted his resignation as early as April 1920, some two months before Toplis was killed in Plumpton. Parry had previously served as Chief Constable of Bath.

Drawing on a range of inconsistencies and implausibilities arising from the inquest into Toplis's death and from the post mortem report produced by Drs Edington and McDonald, the 2018 book, Who Shot Percy Toplis, written by Jim Cox OBE, advanced the theory that it was Norman de Courcy Parry and not Ritchie, Bertram or Fulton who fired the shot that killed Percy. Norman, the son of the Chief Constable, admitted that he had been carrying a revolver, but claimed never to have fired it. The author, a former GP in the Eden Valley, reviewed the post mortem report and concluded that the path of the fatal bullet did not correspond with the version of events provided by police at the inquest.

== Books ==
- Jaynie Bilton: Chasing Percy (2002)
- William Allison & John Fairley: The Monocled Mutineer (Quartet, 1978)
- Edwin T. Woodhall: Detective and Secret Service Days (Jarrolds, London, 1929)
- Jim Cox: Who Shot Percy Toplis? (Bookcase, Carlisle, 2018)
- Julian Putkowski: Toplis, Etaples & 'The Monocled Mutineer', 'Stand To!' - Journal of the Western Front Association, No. 18, Winter 1986, pp. 6–11
