= Cumbria Institute of the Arts =

Former art school in Carlisle, England

Coordinates: 54.906°N 2.932°W

Cumbria Institute Of The Arts

Location
- Brampton Road; Carlisle, Cumbria; England

Information
- Specialist: Art & Design College
- Gender: Mixed

The Cumbria Institute of the Arts was a further and higher education institution in Carlisle, Cumbria, England.

== History ==
Founded as the Society for the Encouragement of Fine Arts in 1822, it proceeded as the Carlisle College of Art, from 1950, and switched to Cumbria Institute of the Arts from Cumbria College of Art and Design in 2001.

The Institute merged with St Martin's College (founded in Lancaster) to form the University of Cumbria on 1 August 2007. Cumbria Institute became the University's Faculty of Arts.

== Notable alumni ==
- Rikki Chamberlain, actor (Captain Mack)
- Michael Cumming, director
- Bryan Dick, actor (The Long Firm, Blackpool, Blood and Chocolate)
- Richard Dyer, co-founder of Skiddle Ltd
- Sheila Fell, landscape painter
- Margaret Harrison, artist
- Charlie Hunnam, actor (Sons of Anarchy, Byker Grove, Queer as Folk)
- Percy Kelly, artist
- Helen Skelton, TV presenter (Blue Peter)
- Keith Tyson, 2002 Turner Prize winner
- Lorna Graves, painter, sculptor
- Shuchi Thakur, rally driver
