= Shuchi =

Shuchi is a given name, used as a female name in India and China and as a male name in Japan. It is the name of:

- Shuchi Chawla, US-based Indian computer scientist
- Shuchi Grover, educator
- Shuchi Kothari, New Zealand-based Indian scriptwriter and producer
- Shuchi Kubouchi (1920–2020), Japanese professional Go player
- Shuchi Thakur, Indian professional rally driver
- Yuan Shu-chi (born 1984), Chinese archer

== See also ==
- The Bookworm (short story), originally titled "Shuchi"
