= John Fairley =

British television producer

John Alexander Fairley FRTS (born 15 April 1938) is a British former television producer from Liverpool, who now lives in Yorkshire. With William Allison he wrote the 1978 book The Monocled Mutineer, made into a well-known 1986 BBC One controversial drama series, adapted by Alan Bleasdale.

== Early life ==
He was born in Liverpool. He attended MerchantTaylor's school in Crosby, Merseyside and then went to The Queen's College, Oxford.

== Career ==
=== Newspapers ===
He started at the Bristol Evening Post in 1963, then went to the London Evening Standard in 1964.

=== Radio ===
From 1965 to 1968, he was a radio producer with BBC Radio.

=== Yorkshire Television ===
He worked for Yorkshire Television (now ITV Yorkshire). He was a television producer from 1968 to 1978. He became Managing Director of Yorkshire-Tyne Tees Television in 1993 until April 1995. He was replaced on 15 May 1995 by Bruce Gyngell, the former managing director from 1984 to 1992 of TV-am. During his employment at Yorkshire Television, he was the Producer of the cave diving documentary The Underground Eiger.

== Publications ==
He has written numerous books with Simon Welfare.

- The Monocled Mutineer, 1978, about the Étaples mutiny, written with William Allison
- Arthur C Clarke's Mysterious World, published by Fontana 1980, written with Simon Welfare and Arthur C Clarke
- Arthur C Clarke's World of Strange Powers, published by Collins 1984, written with Simon Welfare and Arthur C Clarke
- Arthur C Clarke's Chronicles of the Strange and Mysterious, published by HarperCollins 1987, written with Simon Welfare and Arthur C Clarke
- Arthur C Clarke's Mysteries, published by Michael O'Mara Books Ltd. 1998, written with Simon Welfare

== Personal life ==
He lives in North Yorkshire, in Eddlethorpe in Ryedale. He is married and has three daughters.

== See also ==
- Ward Thomas (television executive), former chairman from 1993 to 1997 of Yorkshire Television
