= Peter's Key =

- Author: Declan Dunne
- Language: English
- Genre: Non-fiction, History, Action & Adventure
- Publisher: Mercier Press
- Publication date: 17 September 2012
- Publication place: Ireland
- Media type: Print and Amazon Kindle
- Pages: 320 pages Approx
- ISBN: 1781170592

Peter's Key is a 2012 non-fiction book by Declan Dunne. It was published through Mercier Press on 17 September 2012. Peter's Key recounts the story of Peter de Loughry, who arranged to help free Éamon de Valera from Lincoln Prison during the Irish War of Independence. De loughry was Dunne's grandfather, and the book took him four years to write, with help from others.

== Synopsis ==
The book covers de loughry's time in Lincoln Prison and his successful attempt to break out of prison with Éamon de Valera, and other men. The prison break took him months to plan, which included creating a wax impression of a chaplain's key. De loughry then went through three keys before succeeding on the fourth attempt. During and after the escape from prison de loughry remained the Mayor of Kilkenny, a position he held for six consecutive years.

== Reception ==
The Tuam Herald praised Peter's Key, calling it "a fine example of filial piety, and a worthy addition to the literature of this period."
