= Lorna Graves =

British artist (1947–2006)

- Born: 1947; Kendal, England, UK
- Died: 2006 (aged 58–59)
- Education: London University, Cambridge College of Art and Technology, Cumbria College of Art and Design
- Known for: Painting, drawing, printmaking and sculpture

Lorna Graves (1947–2006) was a British artist who worked across a diverse range of media including painting, drawing, printmaking and sculpture. Her artwork was deeply connected to nature, the Cumbrian landscape and ancient cultures.

== Early life and career ==
Born in Kendal, Graves was brought up by her mother, her father, on a private income, having left the home when she was around 2 years old. Her mother worked determinedly to keep her head above water, working as a farm hand near Brampton and Burgh by Sands, not as has been written. She then trained as an NHS nurse. During this period Lorna was under foster carers in Carlisle, memories which had an enduring sense of darkness, and some months in a childrens home in Scotby Carlisle. Mother and daughter reunited when her mother started work at Carlisle Infirmary and they returned to live on the farm near Brampton for the duration of Lorna's schooling. Contrary to some mythological written accounts, her parents thus were not itinerant farm workers. This formative experience would inspire her deep connection to the landscape and animals.

After a period as a secretary in the RAF and after the end of her first marriage where she described being physically assaulted by her husband. Lorna finished her A levels and left Cumbria in 1969 to study Geography (not"Earth Sciences") at Bedford College London University. After a curtained period training as a teacher near Oxford, she worked as a secretary in Oxford University institutions, married biochemistry graduate Martin Morris who went on to train as a violin maker in Cambridge. After hospitalisation during a mental health crisis, a problem that was to return, and brief periods of both administrative and farm employment, she started to explore the visual arts - while being supported financially by her husband for her artistic endeavours until the couple separated in 1984 and divorced. From 1976 (not 1981) she attended Life Drawing classes and took classes in sign writing and calligraphy at Cambridgeshire School of Art and Technology along with private tuition in Chinese Painting and calligraphy. before going to art school in Cambridge, and in 1981 began studying at Cumbria College of Art and Design. After this point she worked full-time as a painter and sculptor.

An important early commission was to create studies of the Ruthwell Cross, an 8th Century Anglo-Saxon monument just north of the Scottish border in Dumfries and Galloway. The stylised animal depictions of Christ standing on the heads of beasts would go on to inspire Graves' artwork.

In the mid nineties she moved her studio to the Barbican in London but had returned to Cumbria by 2001.

She continued to produce work, including important commissions such as a crucifix for Carver Memorial Church in Windermere and a collaboration with Welfare State International, for which she created a hand-painted coffin. Her work has been shown across the UK, Japan, Germany and the United States.

Her artwork is held by collections including: Tullie House Museum, Abbott Hall Art Gallery, Penrith and Eden Museum and other public collections.

== Artwork ==
Graves used simple forms in her work to represent archetypes such as Cumbrian woman, beast, fish, boat, landscape, angel, standing stones. These stylised shapes express core elemental forms and are suggestive of prehistoric art. Her artwork is instinctive and conveys a spiritual link with nature.

=== Sculpture ===
Her sculpture was typically stoneware ceramic and she used the Western style of Raku glazing in which, after modelling and firing, her sculptures were set amongst combustible material such as twigs and leaves. In burning, the smoke and remnants of these objects leave behind marks and traces on the body of the sculpture and give an aged and bone-like appearance. This held a ritual and spiritual significance for the artist and she included her father's ashes as part of the work Burial Ground.

=== Painting ===
Graves also made use of simplified forms and recurring archetypes in her painting. As with her sculpture, she focused on recurring symbols such as simplified upland landscapes with strong horizons; angels, boats and animal figures.

== Notable exhibitions and awards ==
- Oppenheim-Downs Memorial Award 2001
- Body and Soul June, Pyramid Gallery, June 2013 - July 2013
- Lorna Graves (1947-2006): Memories of Belonging, Penrith and Eden Museum, March 2018 - June 2018

== Works in public collections ==
Title	Year	Medium	Gallery no.	Gallery	Location
Buried	2006	Oil on canvas	2008.229.20	Tullie House Museum and Art Gallery	Carlisle, UK
The Rider	1996	Bronze	PD1996.8	Penrith and Eden Museum	Penrith, UK
Cumbrian Snowscape	2005	Oil on board	2008.229.19	Tullie House Museum and Art Gallery	Carlisle, UK
Red Skirt	1978–2006	Oil on board	2008.229.6	Tullie House Museum and Art Gallery	Carlisle, UK
Burial Gound	c.2006	Earthenware, wood & metal	PD2015.1	Penrith and Eden Museum	Penrith, UK
Chalice	2005	Oil on board	2008.229.15	Tullie House Museum and Art Gallery	Carlisle, UK
Animal with Moon in a Moonlit Landscape	2001–2006	Oil on canvas	2008.229.11	Tullie House Museum and Art Gallery	Carlisle, UK
Field	2005	Oil on panel	2008.229.22	Tullie House Museum and Art Gallery	Carlisle, UK
Winged Figure	2001–2006	Oil on board	2008.229.3	Tullie House Museum and Art Gallery	Carlisle, UK
Animal	1984	Earthenware	AH02656	Abbot Hall Art Gallery	Kendal, UK
