= HM Prison Lincoln =

Men's prison in Lincoln, Lincolnshire, England

Coordinates: 53°14′07″N 0°31′05″W

HMP Lincoln
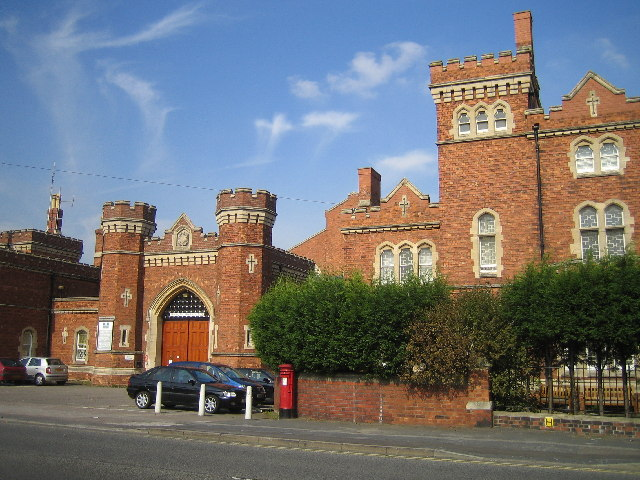
- Interactive map of HMP Lincoln
- Location: Lincoln, Lincolnshire
- Security class: Adult Male/Category B
- Capacity: 408 (baseline certified normal capacity)
- Population: 567 (May 2025)
- Opened: 1872
- Managed by: HM Prison Services
- Governor: Colin Hussey
- Website: Lincoln at justice.gov.uk

HM Prison Lincoln is a Category B men's prison, located in Lincoln, Lincolnshire, England. The prison is operated by His Majesty's Prison Service. A category B prison which allocates convicted prisoners within its catchment area.

== History ==
Lincoln opened as a local prison in 1872 to hold remand and convicted prisoners and replacing the prison at Lincoln Castle. The original 1869–72 structures designed by Frederick Peck are now listed buildings and are notable examples of High Victorian gothic design. The prison accommodation has been altered and extended at various times in the 20th century.

Between 1900 and 1961 a total of 18 judicial executions took place at the prison. The last execution was that of Wasyl Gnypiuk, a 34-year-old Polish-Ukrainian immigrant. After being convicted of the murder of Louise Surgey (his 62-year-old landlady) at Nottingham Assizes, Gnypiuk was hanged by executioner Harry Allen on 27 January 1961. Afterwards, his body was buried in an unmarked grave within the walls of the prison, as was customary.

In October 2002 inmates set fire to parts of the prison and seized control of at least one section of the prison during a large riot at Lincoln. The disturbance started when a prison officer was attacked by a prisoner. A number of prisoners then jumped on the officer, assaulted him and dragged him into a cell and took his keys. It took prison officers eight hours to bring the riot under control.

In March 2003 The Prison Reform Trust issued a report claiming that Lincoln Prison was unstable and suffering inconsistent leadership. The Trust also labelled Lincoln as the nation's most overcrowded prison, holding 13 inmates over its maximum capacity of 738. Its operational capacity as of April 2023 is 650 inmates.

== The prison today ==
Lincoln is a Category B local prison holding adult male remand and convicted prisoners from the courts in Lincolnshire, Nottinghamshire and the East Riding of Yorkshire. Accommodation at the prison is spread across four residential wings (A, B, C & E wings) and a segregation unit.

The regime at Lincoln includes production workshops, charity workshops, laundry, education, vocational training courses and Offending behaviour courses. Other facilities include the prison's gym.

In 2025 HM Inspectorate of Prisons identified HMP Lincoln as setting standards for other prisons due to comparatively low rates of violence and drug use. Overcrowding and time spent in cells were however cited as concerns.

== Notable former inmates ==
- Jeffrey Archer; English author and politician, imprisoned for perjury
- Fenner Brockway, Baron Brockway; British peace campaigner and later a politician who was imprisoned as a conscientious objector.
- Matthew Zilch; International musician from Stamford, Lincolnshire. Imprisoned for possession with intent to supply of class A drugs. He was caught with the most valuable amount ever seized in Lincolnshire
- ODon Brothwell; British archaeologist who was imprisoned after refusing the call-up for National Service as a conscientious objector
- Fred Nodder; Child murderer executed at Lincoln in 1937; In 1954 his infamous crime led to English case law no longer requiring a body.
- John George Haigh; English serial killer in the 1940s
- John Poulson; British architect and businessman, imprisoned for bribery
- Percy Toplis; the subject of the controversial Monacled Mutineer series about his alleged role in the Étaples mutiny served two years hard labour for attempted rape
- Éamon de Valera; Irish politician, later Taoiseach and President of Ireland
- Charles Salvador; British Prisoner
