= Alan Bleasdale =

English screenwriter

- Born: 23 March 1946 (age 80); Liverpool, England
- Occupation: Scriptwriter
- Spouse: Julie Moses (m. 1967)
- Children: 3

Alan George Bleasdale (born 23 March 1946) is an English screenwriter, best known for social realist drama serials based on the lives of ordinary people. A former teacher, he has written for radio, stage and screen, and has also written novels. Bleasdale's plays typically represented a more realistic, contemporary depiction of life in Liverpool than was usually seen in the media.

== Early life ==
Born in Liverpool, Bleasdale is an only child; his father worked in a food factory and his mother in a grocery shop. From 1951 to 1957, he went to the St. Aloysius Roman Catholic Infant and Junior Schools in Huyton-with-Roby outside Liverpool. From 1957 to 1964, he attended the Wade Deacon Grammar School in Widnes. In 1967, he obtained a teaching certificate from the Padgate College of Education in Warrington (which became Warrington Collegiate Institute, now part of the University of Chester).

== Career ==
For four years he worked as a teacher at St Columba's Secondary Modern School in Huyton from 1967 to 1971, then King George V School (now the King George V & Elaine Bernacchi School in Bikenibeu in South Tarawa) on the Gilbert and Ellice Islands (now called Kiribati) from 1971 to 1974, and lastly at Halewood Grange Comprehensive School (now known as Halewood College) in Halewood from 1974 to 1985. From 1985 to 1986, he worked as a playwright at the Liverpool Playhouse (becoming associate director) and the Contact Theatre in Manchester (a University of Manchester venue).

== Broadcasting ==
Bleasdale's first successes came as the writer of radio dramas for the BBC; several of these plays followed the character of Scully, a young man from Liverpool, and were broadcast on BBC Radio Merseyside. Between 1974 and 1979, the character of Scully continued on Radio City Liverpool through a series titled the Franny Scully Show. The character became so successful that Bleasdale wrote a stage play, two novels, and in 1978, a Play for Today titled Scully's New Year's Eve.

That same year Bleasdale wrote a single play for the BBC1 anthology series Play for Today entitled The Black Stuff about a group of Liverpudlian tarmac layers. Filmed in 1978 and screened in 1980, the play focused on the issue of unemployment and despair felt by working class British citizens. Prior to screening, Bleasdale wrote to David Rose, head of BBC English Regions Drama, and Michael Wearing, script supervisor, and pitched the idea of a five-part series of plays that further explored the characters from The Black Stuff. The result was the BAFTA winning series Boys from the Blackstuff, which was transmitted on BBC2 in 1982. Bernard Hill starred in the role of Yosser Hughes, whose catch-phrase "Gizza job" ("give us [me] a job") became synonymous with the mass unemployment of the Thatcher years. The series established Bleasdale as one of Britain's leading television writers and social commentators.

After The Black Stuff but before Boys from the Blackstuff, Bleasdale wrote The Muscle Market, which aired as a Play for Today on TV in 1981 and starred Pete Postlethwaite and Alison Steadman. Unlike Blackstuff, this play looked at the road construction industry from the boss' side rather than the workers.

Bleasdale wrote the screenplay for his only feature film No Surrender (1985), a black comedy which examines the animosity between the Protestants and Roman Catholics of Northern Ireland. Set in a seedy Liverpool night club, the film focuses on a group of elderly Protestant hardliners attending a New Year's Eve party on the same evening as a group of Catholic retirees.

Bleasdale adapted William Allison and John Fairley's 1978 book The Monocled Mutineer into a four part miniseries in 1986. The series, starring Paul McGann, dramatises the WWI Etaples Mutiny of 1917. In 1987, Charlottetown Festival director Walter Learning presented the Canadian premiere of the Bleasdale musical Are You Lonesome Tonight? at the Confederation Centre of the Arts, a national arts centre located on Prince Edward Island. The musical, which took a tough look at the life of Elvis Presley, attracted controversy at a festival for its coarse language and adult subject matter. Regardless of the objections, brought up in the provincial legislature, the play was a success for the festival. Bleasdale penned the political drama G.B.H. (Great British Holiday) for Channel 4 in 1991. Focussing on the political upheaval of the Labour Party in Liverpool, G.B.H. pits mild-mannered protagonist Jim Nelson against the northern City Council leader Michael Murray.

In 1994, Bleasdale collaborated with Keith Thompson and David Jones on an anthology of four filmed dramas written by authors who had no prior screenwriting credits. The scripts were chosen from a pool of 2,000 applicants, with Bleasdale acting as producer/mentor to each of the four writers chosen and then working on the projects from start to finish. The films, Andrew Cullen's Self Catering, Raymond Murtagh's Requiem Apache, Jim Morris' Blood On the Dole, and Christopher Hood's Pleasure, were screened over four consecutive weeks in October of that year.

Bleasdale continued his work for Channel 4 with 1995's serial Jake's Progress, the story of a modern-day dysfunctional family (Robert Lindsay as the father and Julie Walters as the mother) struggling to cope with a "difficult" child (Barclay Wright).

In 1999, Bleasdale adapted Charles Dickens' Oliver Twist into a four part miniseries for ITV. The adaptation was well received, but attracted some controversy as Bleasdale expanded the narrative by adding a backstory for the character of Oliver.

After an eleven-year absence from television, Bleasdale returned in January 2011 on BBC Two with a two-part TV film, The Sinking of the Laconia. He had been working on the screenplay since 2004; it depicted the events surrounding the World War II ocean liner RMS Laconia and the Laconia incident.

== Personal life ==
Bleasdale married Julie Moses on 28 December 1970. They have two sons and one daughter.

Bleasdale's house is the main location in Nickelodeon's youth series called House of Anubis, which premiered in January 2011.
