= Rikki Chamberlain =

British actor

- Born: Rikki David James Chamberlain; 30 July 1973 (age 52); Aldershot, England
- Occupation: Actor
- Years active: 2006–present
- Children: 1

Rikki David James Chamberlain (/ˈrɪki ˈtʃeɪmbərlɪn/; born 30 July 1973 in Aldershot, Hampshire, England) is a British actor best known for playing Samson in CITV's Captain Mack.

== Early life ==
Chamberlain was born in the Louise Margaret Hospital on 30 July 1973.

After several school detentions for 'mimicking' teachers at school, his form tutor suggested he audition for the newly forming youth theatre in the town's Gaiety Theatre. Activity in the Ayr youth theatre and the local Ayr school of dancing, led him to undertake a professional dancer's training at the Theatre School of Dance and Drama in Edinburgh. After a knee injury enforced an eighteen-month break in his dancing career, he decided to undertake a training in acting to which he has often said he felt "better suited than being a dancer". This led to a BA (HONS) in Performing Arts at Cumbria Institute of the Arts and then a Post Graduate diploma from Mountview Academy of Theatre Arts in London, where he won the Dame Judi Dench scholarship to help with the cost of training.

== Selected Credits ==
- Captain Mack (Samson - children's programme on CITV)
- As You Like It (Jaques)
- The Comedy of Errors (Dromio of Ephesus)
