= Jim Morris (playwright) =

English playwright

James Vincent Morris (born 1953, Birkenhead, Cheshire) is an English playwright associated with social realism.

== Career ==
He was voted Most Promising Playwright of 1981 by The Financial Times and The Morning Star for his first stage play Blood On The Dole which was performed at The Liverpool Playhouse in 1981 where he was resident playwright. He also co-founded Liverpool Lunchtime Theatre (LLt) in 1982 with three other writers - Paul Goetzee, Bruce Birchall and Denis Wainwright.

His first stage play, Blood On The Dole was later made into a Television Film in 1994 and was broadcast on Channel 4. It was directed by Pip Broughton and produced by Alan Bleasdale as part of ‘Alan Bleasdale Presents’. Starring Stephen Walters and Suzanne Maddock; it told the story of two working class Merseyside school leavers and their struggles in facing a life of unemployment and social deprivation.

== Stage Plays ==
- Blood On The Dole (1981), performed at Liverpool Playhouse
- The Holiday (1983), performed at Liverpool Playhouse
- The Fox and Hounds (1984), performed at the Warehouse Theatre in Croydon
- Pinocchio Boys (1986), toured with Paines Plough starring Ian Hart
- Changing Gear (1987), performed at Liverpool Playhouse
- A Man From The Motor Trade (1995), performed at the Unity Theatre Liverpool
- Exposure - The Story Of Mallory and Irvine (2000), performed at Andrew Irvine‘s childhood home part of Year of the Artist

== Film and television ==
- Blood On The Dole (1994), broadcast on Channel 4, produced by Alan Bleasdale. It was released on DVD 28 May 2018.

== Radio Plays ==
- Boy (1995), an adaption of a James Hanley novel Boy (1931), broadcast on BBC Radio 3
- The Seaside Came Out Of The Van (2005), Broadcast on BBC Radio Four about the Morecambe Bay cockling disaster
- Fused Rice Bowl (2006), broadcast on BBC Radio 3

== Other works ==
- Hand on The Braille, a novel shortlisted Constable Trophy for an unpublished novel, 1990
- Song of Inishmaan and London Song (2012), part of a song cycle entitled 'Opened Spaces' on the album Songs Now- British Songs Of the 21st Century written in collaboration with Dr Tom Armstrong of the University of Surrey and released on Meridian Records
- Eldorado - in Liverpool (2011), The Guardian Northern Guest Blog, the photographs of Peter Hagerty
- Tom Wood: The DPA Work (2019), essay on the Cammell Laird shipyard. Published by Steidl and the University of Chester
