= Base Details =

Poem by Siegfried Sassoon

Base Details is a war poem by the English war poet Siegfried Sassoon that takes place in the First World War. Sassoon wrote it in his diary entry for 4 March 1917. The poem is written about how the staff officers of the British Army (referred to as "scarlet majors") deploy soldiers to the war front to be killed, while they stay at the Base "guzzling and gulping in the best hotel" and sending "glum heroes up the line to death". Like Sassoon's many other poems, "Base Details" is bitterly sarcastic and derisive of the comfortable establishment that supported the continuation of the war while showing little concern for the people who suffered its consequences. It took place during World War I in France around 1914-1918.

The theme is anger and bitterness. It expresses anger to those who start wars and send their fellow men to their death. The main message is that army officers plan battles from safety of their base, and are usually not involved in the fighting, and therefore does not know the horrors that they are forcing soldiers to face. The first two quartiles are talking about the Majors, in a very sarcastic way, and the last couplet talks about how the war isn't actually a joke, that it is very serious.

== Analysis ==
Base Details

If I were fierce, and bald, and short of breath, ...
I'd live with scarlet Majors at the Base,
And speed glum heroes up the line to death.
You'd see me with my puffy petulant face,
Guzzling and gulping in the best hotel,
Reading the Roll of Honour. "Poor young chap,"
I'd say—"I used to know his father well;
Yes, we've lost heavily in this last scrap."
And when the war is done and youth stone dead,
I'd toddle safely home and die—in bed.

The major in this poem is cynical, and he treats war as if it is a game, calling it a 'last scrap.' The major knows nothing of war because he has never been on the frontline. The major is a figure associated with power and privilege. Also, he knows that the meaning of the "last scrap" is how the major thinks of war, a game.

The title of the poem is "Base Details"- Base possibly meaning a military base Details could be a command assignment, someone or something lowly. "fierce, and bald, and short of breath" would be a stereotypical World War I officer.

"Glum heroes" refer to heroes by dying they are unhappy. "Up the line" is the battlefield. "puffy petulant face" is the officer's face from the excessive eating and drinking. "Guzzling and gulping in the best hotel": The officers eat and drink until their hearts delight while the best hotel refers to them living in the lap of luxury. This also could portray them as acting like monsters and this is what Sassoon intended.

In the second line is the phrase "scarlet major" which is possibly a double entendre . Scarlet (red) has several different meanings. One reference is to the red tabs that staff officers wore on the lapels of their dress uniforms. These denoted them as non-regimental officers that would never see actual fighting, but work safely in the rear headquarters. Another reference is to the red blood on their hands from knowing that they have killed all these people by sending them to the front line. It could also imply that their faces are red from being drunk or that they are very childish, which implies they are ignorant and will do anything to get what they want. Also their faces might be red because they are so obese and they are out of breath from doing nothing.

"Poor Young Chap" this direct speech can be interpreted as that it mimics the Majors as they pretend to care, to get the public on their side, said almost as a matter of routine. The term "Scrap" can refer to the generals and Majors referring to the war as a game, or "scrap". "Youth stone dead" a very blunt metaphor which shows the harshness of the author, who is not impressed. The last two lines however show how the war is not just a game, and how young boys are being slaughtered for small sections of land that should not be valued the same as people's lives. "Toddle" refers to the drunk Major and a very good use of satire as it is effective in diminishing the normal view of a major, and "Die" is what Siegfried wants the major to do. Siegfried Sassoon shows great disgust towards military majors. He is appalled at the way the majors act while men are dying in the battlefield. The majors are fat, insensitive, greedy, vain and very proud, and display no empathy with the soldiers whatsoever. The use of iambic pentameter and a regular rhyming scheme help create a tone of sarcasm. As the topic is serious such an upbeat rhythm would normally, seem inappropriate except that Sassoon skillfully employs the techniques to satirize the complacent attitude of majors who never have to face the horror of war.
