= Captain Mack =

British children TV show

- Created by: John Lomas Bullivant
- Starring: Bennet Thorpe; Rikki Chamberlain; Andrew Greenough; Richard Brinkmann; Karl Morgan; Julia Mallam; Akiya Henry; Hefin Wyn
- Composer: Danny Chang
- Country of origin: United Kingdom
- Original language: English
- No. of seasons: 1
- No. of episodes: 52

Production
- Executive producer: John Lomas Bullivant
- Producer: Iain Russell
- Running time: 11 minutes
- Production company: Fireback Entertainment

Original release
- Network: ITV (CITV)
- Release: February 1, 2008 – March 21, 2010

Captain Mack is a British children's television show created and developed by John Lomas Bullivant and produced by Fireback Entertainment for CITV. The series is set in a colourful setting called Sunshine City, where a superhero helps out with the troubles and issues that happen, normally caused by a selection of tricksters. The series was promoted as being "non-violent" and was made to teach simple life lessons and morals to its target audience.

== Synopsis ==
The titular Captain Mack is based in Sky Rocket Control, with his trusty monkey engineer Samson. They keep an eye on the residents of Sunshine City, particularly the naughty ones (Marty Meddler, Tracy Trickster, and Grabby Crabby). Sunshine City is bright, colourful clean and cheerful, inhabited by some of the nicest people you could ever meet.

These include Yolanda Yummy (cook), Peter Patent (inventor), Fineas Fixit (odd job man), Doctor Kwack (GP), Daisy Digger (gardener), Wendy Whizz (keep fit fanatic), Camilla Divine (artist), Maximus Volume (singer) and Rosie Raucous (saleswoman).

Captain Mack always leaves with the phrase "Shucks, I have to go. My monkey needs me. Another mission awaits!" When there is trouble in Sunshine City, Captain Mack uses the phrase, "Sky Rockets to the rescue!" And when other things happen, Captain Mack uses the phrase, "Never fear, Mack is here!"

== Cast ==
Cast	Character(s)
Bennet Thorpe	Captain Mack
Rikki Chamberlain	Samson
Andrew Greenough	Mayor Gaston Goody
Richard Brinkmann	Marty Meddler/Maximus Volume/Doctor Kwack
Karl Morgan	Grabby Crabby/Fineas Fixit/Peter Patent
Julia Mallam	Tracy Trickster/Daisy Digger/Camilla Divine
Akiya Henry	Yolanda Yummy/Wendy Whizz/Rosie Raucous
Hefin Wyn	Narrator

== Development ==
The series originally began development in August 2004 as a stop-motion animated series produced as a co-production between Kickback Productions and Canadian animation studio Cuppa Coffee Animation. The series was described as a non-violent take on the superhero genre, with the titular character using "charisma and friendliness to save his friends from peril." The series was set to have twenty-six 11-minute episodes which would be available for a Fall 2005-Early-2006 delivery window. Two years later in May 2006, CITV was announced as the series' commissioner and that the series was now set for a Fall-2007 delivery window, now having fifty-two episodes.

Throughout the two years, the series was reworked as a live-action/CGI production, with Kickback Productions eventually merging with fellow independent company Fire Mountain Productions to form Fireback Entertainment by January 2008. In late-February 2008, Granada International secured worldwide distribution rights for the series except in the UK.

== Broadcast ==
from 1 February 2008 to 21 March 2010 and reran from 22 March 2010 to 6 January 2013, Tiny Pop and Mini CITV.

In Australia, it was shown on ABC2 (ABC For Kids On 2). It also ran in New Zealand on TVNZ 7 and aired on Cartoonito in 2013, earlier than before.

In 2023, the series was remastered, with all 52 episodes released on its YouTube Channel, in both English and Turkish.
