= Penrith and Eden Museum =

Museum in Penrith, Cumbria, England

- Location in Eden, Cumbria Location in Cumbria, England
- Established: 1985
- Location: Penrith, Cumbria
- Coordinates: 54.6642°N 2.7512°W
- Collections: Local history, fine art
- Owner: Westmorland and Furness Council
- Website: Penrith and Eden Museum

Penrith and Eden Museum is a museum in Penrith, Cumbria, England. The museum aims to collect, preserve and display material reflecting the history and culture of Penrith and Eden. The museum is owned and managed by Westmorland and Furness Council. The museum is based in a former school building, known as Robinson's School, which first opened in 1670.

== Exhibits ==
Museum interior

Some of the museum's exhibits include a fossil dinosaur footprint from the sandstone of the Eden Valley; objects from the Stone Age and the Roman period, including a coin hoard of over 600 bronze coins dating from about AD 320-340 found at Newby near Shap and Roman jewellery found locally; the medieval seal of Penrith and the old market toll measures; a gold posy ring found on the outskirts of Penrith and inscribed Kepe Faith Till Death; mementoes of local personalities such as Trooper William Pearson, wrestler William Jameson and Percy Toplis, the ‘Monocled Mutineer’; and an elephant's tooth excavated from the bottom of the moat at Penrith Castle.

More recently, the Museum has acquired new finds from the Eden area discovered with metal detectors and declared treasure under the Treasure Act (1996) which are now on display in the Museum. These include a Charles 1st medallion from Kirkby Stephen, a medieval coin hoard from Crosby Ravensworth and a gold and amethyst gemstone ring from Waitby. A Tobacco jar dated 1897 which appears to have been made at the nearby Wetheriggs pottery was given to Penrith and Eden Museum in January 2019.

== Fine art collection ==
The museum's fine art collection includes a group of Dutch and Flemish landscape and genre paintings, as well as British works including examples of the 19th century Penrith artist Jacob Thompson such as The Druids Cutting Down the Mistletoe. It also houses contemporary works by Eden artists Phil Morsman, Alan Stones, Lorna Graves, David Boyd and William S. Cowper.

In December 2019 a picture added to the museum's collection was ‘A Corner of Old Time Penrith’ painted by William Jackson and left to the museum in the will of Mary Laycock Newman of Christchurch. Painted in oils on canvas the subject is dated 1909 and shows shops at the corner of King Street and Market Square, Penrith – including a butcher’s, a fishmonger’s and the premises of John Turner, watchmaker who also traded as a jeweller and gunsmith.

Several items, found by metal detectorists, were acquired by the museum in February 2020 through the Portable Antiquities Scheme. They were valued by the Treasure Valuation Court at the British Museum with the reward shared between the finders and landowners. The finds include a medieval silver finger ring from Kirkby Thore (dating from around AD1150-1250), a medieval gold stirrup-shaped finger ring (dating from around the 13th century AD) which was found at Waitby near Kirkby Stephen and a medieval silver 'teardrop' brooch (made between AD 1200 and 1400).

== Accreditation and awards ==
Penrith and Eden Museum is an accredited museum (No. 153) under the Scheme administered by the Arts Council and a member of the Cumbria Museums Consortium.

== In the media ==
In July 2018 Penrith and Eden Museum featured on the BBC TV series, the Antiques Road Trip with the show focussing on William Jameson (1837-1888), Penrith’s famous Cumberland & Westmorland wrestling champion. The Museum houses a large collection of memorabilia including championship belts and trophies relating to William Jameson.
