= Shuchi Thakur =

Indian rally driver

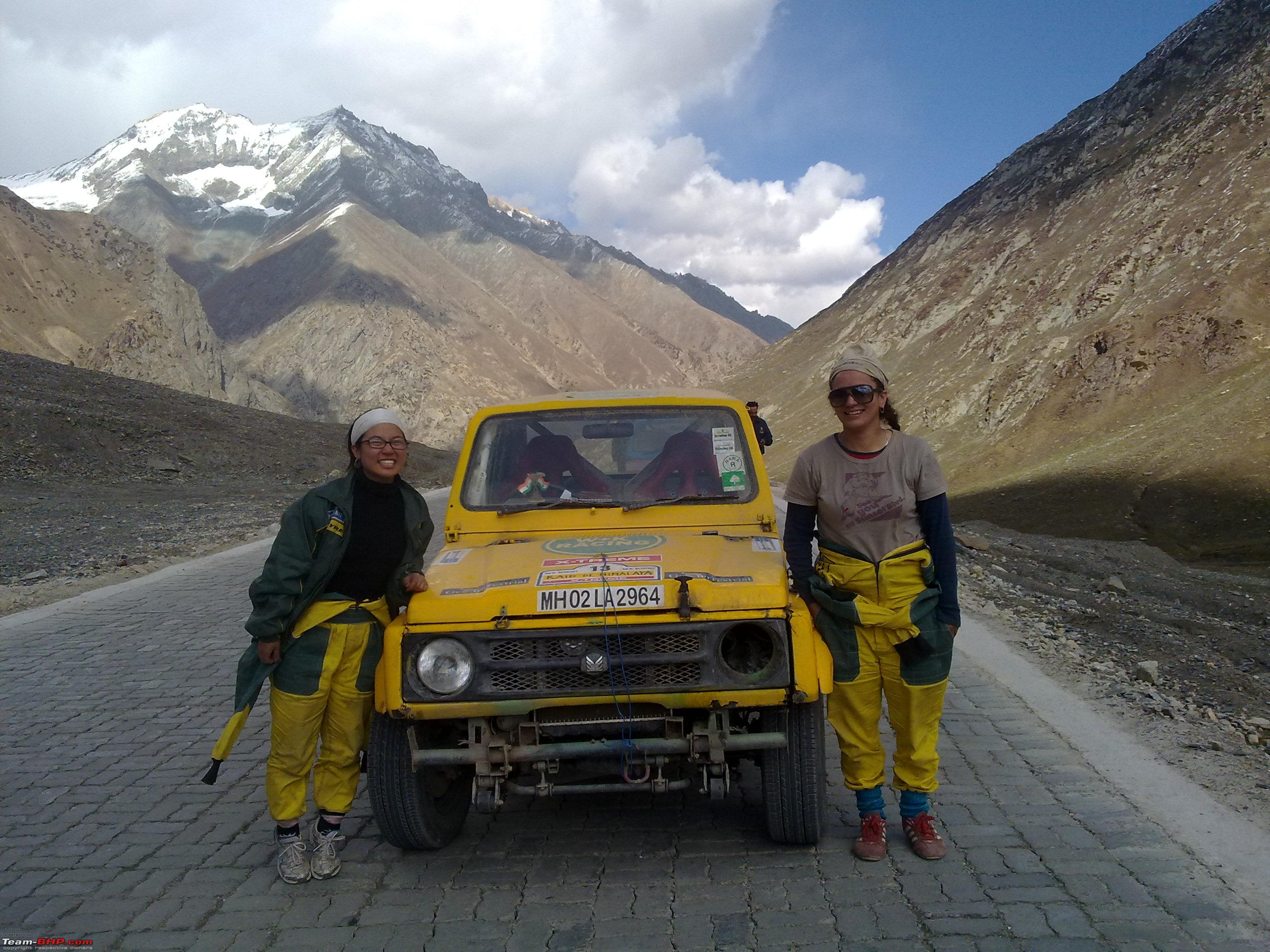
- Shuchi Thakur, right
- Born: Himachal Pradesh, India
- Occupation: Rally driver

Shuchi Thakur is a professional rally driver from Himachal Pradesh, India.

She has been competing in cross-country extreme motorsport in India since 2005. Cross-country rallies like the Raid De Himalaya, the Maruti Suzuki Desert Storm, and the SJOBA Sub-Himalayan Rally, to name a few. She also races at autocross events organised in the country. Shuchi drives a Maruti Gypsy in the cross-country rallies. In addition to the Gypsy, she has also been driving a Maruti Suzuki Zen in the Autocross events.

Commendable podium finishes include 2nd place in the T2 category at the Raid de Himalaya in 2013, a category-winning 1st place in the T2 category at the Raid de Himalaya in 2015 and 2nd place in the T1 category in 2017. At the Maruti Suzuki National Autocross Championship 2016–17, she finished in 1st place in the North Zone 4-Wheel Drive category(driving a Maruti Suzuki Gypsy). and in 3rd place in the North Zone 1400 cc category(driving a Maruti Suzuki Zen).

In August 2022, she finished in 1st place in the T2 category of the Rally of Himalayas.

She received her education at Cumbria Institute of the Arts, St. Stephen's College Delhi and Welham Girls High School Dehradun.

Currently works with Wieden and Kennedy in New Delhi.
