= The Monocled Mutineer =

1986 British TV series

- DVD cover
- Created by: Alan Bleasdale
- Directed by: Jim O'Brien
- Starring: Paul McGann; Cherie Lunghi; Jerome Flynn; Timothy West; Philip McGough
- Composer: George Fenton
- Country of origin: United Kingdom
- Original language: English
- No. of series: 1
- No. of episodes: 4

Production
- Producer: Richard Broke
- Production location: Bearpark, Somerset and Aberystwyth
- Running time: 311 minutes

Original release
- Network: BBC1
- Release: 31 August – 21 September 1986

The Monocled Mutineer is a 1986 BBC four-part drama starring Paul McGann about the Étaples mutiny in 1917 during the First World War. The four-part serial, which was the first historical screenplay written by Alan Bleasdale, dramatised the life of British Army deserter Percy Toplis. It was adapted from the 1978 book of the same name by William Allison and John Fairley.

After ten million people watched the first episode, the British right-wing media vilified the series as an example of left-wing bias at the BBC. The series was produced and broadcast at a time the Peacock Committee was deciding the future of the BBC (there was renewed pressure for the public broadcaster to use advertising). At the same time, the Chairman of the Conservative Party, Norman Tebbit, was monitoring the BBC for evidence of "left-wing bias". Legal action was brought against the BBC over the Panorama programme "Maggie's Militant Tendency", which caused 100 Conservative MPs to sign a motion calling for the resignation of Director General Alasdair Milne and "the restoration of proper standards at the BBC".

The BBC was criticised for marketing The Monocled Mutineer as a true story, when in fact it was a dramatisation of historical events. One of the series' advisers, Julian Putkowski, a WWI military historian, distanced himself from the completed production, citing that the real Percy Toplis was never involved in the mutinies at Étaples, France.

== Synopsis ==
In 1917 Percy Toplis arrives at Étaples, the main depot and transit camp of the British Expeditionary Force in France. Instead of being a rest and recuperation area, weary troops are put through rigorous training drills in the "Bull Ring" overseen by brutal NCOs known as "Canaries" (because of the yellow sash they wear on their caps). The inhuman conditions begin to deeply affect the British, New Zealand, and Australian troops staying in the camp but their protests are rebuffed. A group of mutineers, including Toplis, take weapons from the camp arsenal, attack the NCOs and make their demands directly to the camp commander, General Thomson. Toplis begins wearing an officer's uniform and a monocle. After a three-day stand-off, the camp was retaken and the mutiny ringleaders were executed. Toplis switches disguises and returns to London where he meets Dorothy. Toplis and Dorothy live together for three years before he rejoins the Army under an assumed name in 1920. After he is recognised by someone who was at Étaples, he deserts again. Due to the ignominy the British government feels about the wartime mutiny, a Special Branch officer is assigned to the hunt. Toplis is killed by the officer. The matter at Étaples is judged closed.

== Episodes ==
No.	Title	Original release date
1	"The Making of a Hero"	Sunday 31 August 1986
First part in a four-part series based on the book by William Allison and John Fairley about the true-life figure of Percy Toplis, who led a British army mutiny during the First World War.
2	"Before the Shambles"	Sunday 7 September 1986
Percy Toplis arrives at the Étaples training camp in northern France, where the soldiers are put through a brutal training regime, under the command of Brigadier General Thomson. There is a mutiny of the troops.
3	"When the Hurly-Burly's Done"	Sunday 14 September 1986
Percy Toplis takes charge of negotiations between the mutineers and Brigadier Thomson. When the mutiny is over, Toplis and the other leaders become marked men. Toplis escapes to England using his talents for disguise, and meets and falls in love with Dorothy.
4	"A Dead Man on Leave"	Sunday 21 September 1986
The war is over and Toplis decides to rejoin the Army under a false name. He is recognised by a fellow mutineer and joins a black market racket. A shooting incident is blamed on Toplis and the police are back on his trail.

== Cast ==
- Paul McGann as Percy Toplis (4 episodes)
- Bill Fellows as Geordie (3 episodes)
- Matthew Marsh as Charles Strange (3 episodes)
- Anthony Calf as Guiness (3 episodes)
- Jane Wood as Annie Webster (2 episodes)
- Ron Donachie as Strachan (2 episodes)
- Timothy West as Brigadier General Andrew Thomson (2 episodes)
- Dave Hill as Frank Webster (2 episodes)
- Penelope Wilton as Lady Angela Forbes (2 episodes)
- Jerome Flynn as Franny (2 episodes)
- Cherie Lunghi as Dorothy (2 episodes)
- David Allister as General Asser (2 episodes)
- Geoff Morrell as Aussie Gas Mask (2 episodes)
- Louis Mellis as Scots Gas Mask (2 episodes)
- Philip McGough as Edwin Woodhall (2 episodes)
- Patrick Doyle as Gilzean (2 episodes)
- Aran Bell as Fellows (2 episodes)
- Billy Clarke as Dorothy (2 episodes)
- Terry Cundall as Bertam (2 episodes)
- Peter Hutchinson as Norman (2 episodes)
- Ted Richards as PC Fulton (2 episodes)
- Richard Ireson as Inspector Richie (2 episodes)
- David Miller as Spruce (2 episodes)
- Jim Carter as Spencer (1 episode)

== Production ==
The BBC had originally approached Bleasdale in 1981 to adapt William Allison and John Fairley's 1978 book The Monocled Mutineer, which had at the time of its publication prompted questions in Parliament about the events of the Étaples mutiny, which led to the discovery that all records of the Étaples Board of Enquiry had been destroyed long ago. However, Bleasdale had at the time turned it down saying, "I don't do adaptations." He eventually changed his mind, finding some personal resonances in the story. As he commented: "My grandfather died on the Western Front six months before my father was born, and I found that a great pull to the story ..."

== Reception ==
On 9 September The Daily Telegraph's Defence Correspondent John Keegan criticised The Monocled Mutineer. He said: "The Étaples 'mutinies' amounted to no more than a few days of disorder, a little disrespect to officers and some loudly-voiced demands for humane treatment. The army reacted briskly. It restored discipline by bringing in unaffected troops. It removed the cause of discontent by replacing the worst of the staff with wise men. That is about all there was to the British Army 'mutinies' of the 1914–1918 war."

As a direct result of the mutiny, only a few individuals were punished. Corporal Jesse Robert Short (Northumberland Fusiliers) was condemned to death and shot by a firing squad; three other soldiers were sentenced to 10 years' penal servitude and others were jailed for up to a year's imprisonment with hard labour.

Keegan's piece was followed on 12 September by a statement to the press by Julian Putkowski, who had acted as a historical adviser to the series. He claimed that the serial was "riddled with error" and The Daily Telegraph reported that "He accused the producer of ignoring his advice ... Mr Putkowski disclaimed all responsibility for what he says are factual errors and misinterpretations in the series. He accused the BBC of failing to consult him on the final version of the script and described the book by William Allison and John Fairley, on which the series is based, as 'a sensational version of the mutiny and Toplis' life.'"

In response to this, series producer Richard Broke admitted that there had been "small examples of dramatic licence [taken]", and went on to point out that "Mr Putkowski did not point out to us at any stage that Percy Toplis was not at Étaples Camp and he never challenged the book he knew we were working from." The BBC's Managing Director of Television, Bill Cotton, further defended the series on the basis that it expressed "the greater truth about World War I". The BBC's official line was that the series is a drama, not a documentary and made no pretence at being a precise historical record. However, the damage had been done thanks to their original press campaign which had called The Monocled Mutineer a "true-life story"; Alasdair Milne blamed this on their advertising agency.

== Awards and nominations ==
The BAFTA (1987) awarded to composer George Fenton for "Best Original Television Music" (the series also received 9 other BAFTA nominations)

== Home media releases ==
The series was released as a VHS double box set in 1999 and then as a DVD in 2007.
