= Étaples mutiny =

1917 British mutiny in France

- Part of World War I
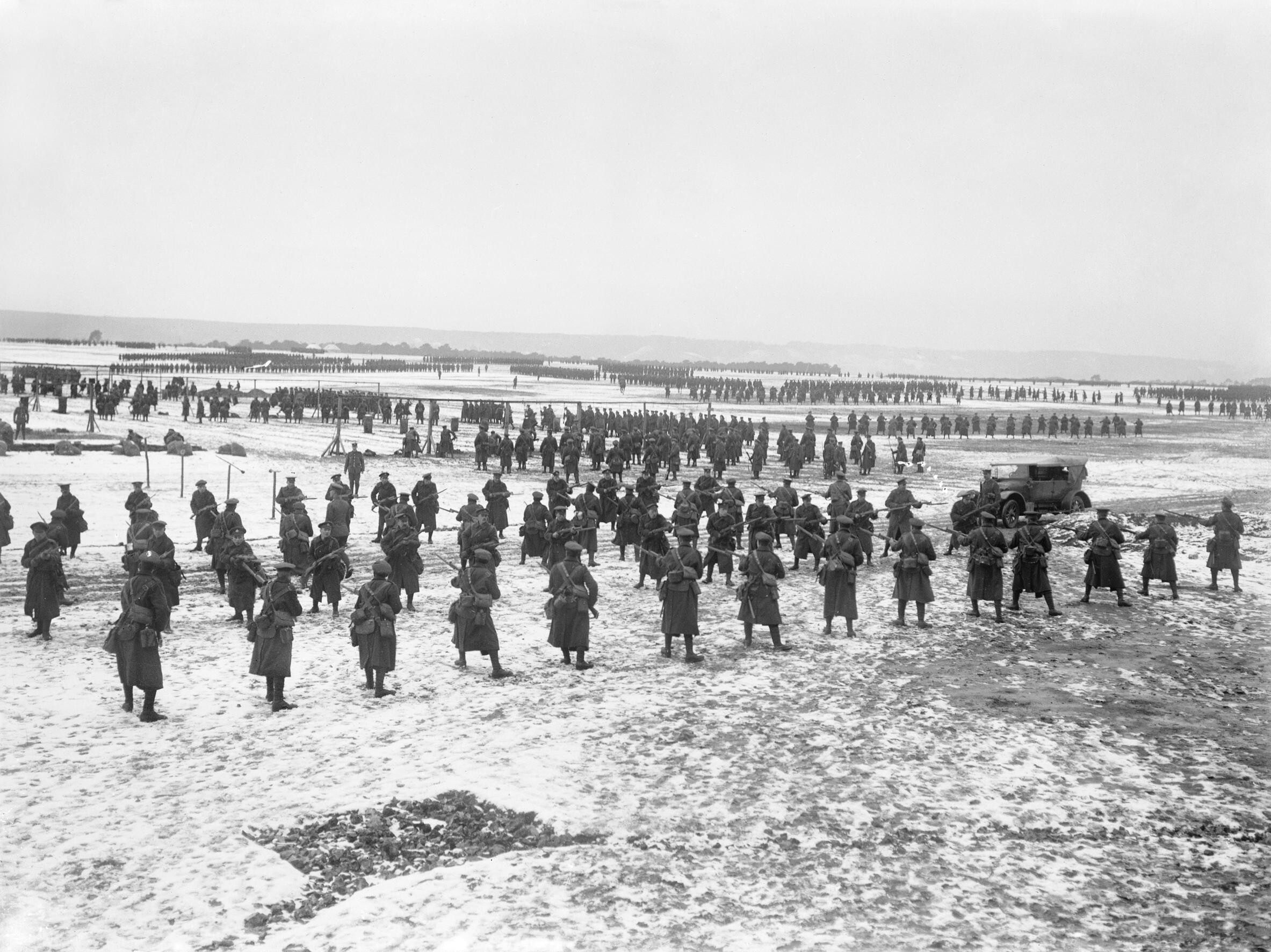
- Allied troops conducting bayonet practice in the infamous "Bull Ring" training camp on the dunes between Étaples and Camiers.
- Date: September 1917
- Location: Étaples, France
- Deaths: Jesse Robert Short was executed

The Étaples mutiny was a series of mutinies in September 1917 by British Army and British Imperial soldiers at a training camp in the coastal port of Étaples in Northern France during World War I.

== Background ==
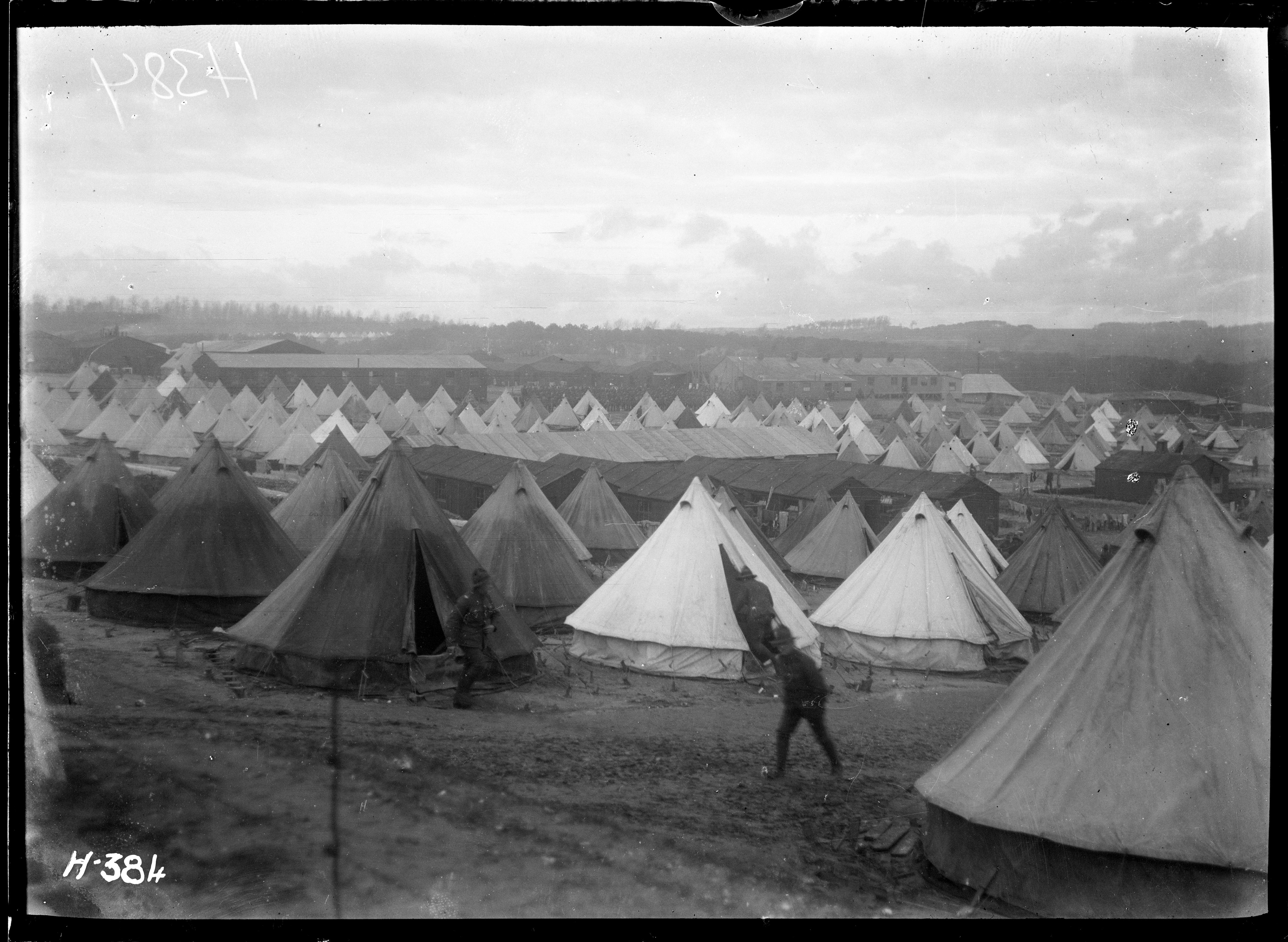
Tents of the New Zealand reinforcement camp at Étaples

Before the war, Étaples, 15 miles (24 km) south of Boulogne-sur-Mer, was a coastal fishing port with a fleet of trawlers. It also attracted artists from around the world.

After 1914, the town became one of the British Army bases along the Channel coast of France. Étaples did not impress British women who volunteered to work in YMCA huts at the base. In the words of Lady Baden-Powell, "Étaples was a dirty, loathsome, smelly little town". Over the river was the smart beach resort known officially as Le Touquet-Paris-Plage, and unofficially as either Le Touquet or Paris-Plage. Le Touquet was in effect officers' territory, and pickets were stationed on the bridge over the Canche to enforce the separation.

Étaples was a particularly notorious base camp for those on their way to the front. The officers and NCOs in charge of the training, the "canaries", had a reputation for not having served at the front, which created a certain amount of tension and contempt. Both raw recruits and battle-weary veterans were subjected to intensive training in gas warfare and bayonet drill, and long sessions of marching at the double across the dunes for two weeks.

== Initial camp disorder ==
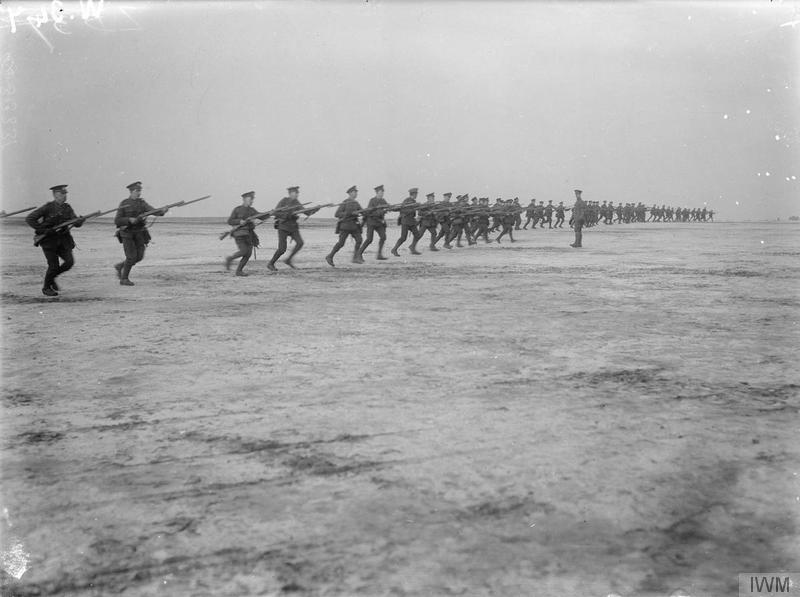
Soldiers practise bayonet charges in the "Bull Ring" on the dunes near Etaples

On 28 August 1916, a member of the Australian Imperial Force (AIF), No.3254 Private Alexander Little, 10th Battalion, verbally abused a British non-commissioned officer after water was cut off while he was having a shower. As he was being escorted to the punishment compound Little resisted and was assisted and released by other members of the AIF and the New Zealand Expeditionary Force (NZEF). Four of these men were later identified, court-martialled, convicted of mutiny and sentenced to death, including Little. Three had their sentences commuted; while the military regulations of the AIF prevented the imposition of capital punishment on its personnel, that was not the case for the NZEF. Consequently, Pte. Jack Braithwaite, an Australian serving with the NZEF's 2nd Battalion, Otago Regiment, was considered to be a repeat offender, and after the death sentence had been confirmed by the British Expeditionary Force's Commander-in-Chief, General Sir Douglas Haig, he was executed by a firing squad on 29 October 1916. His body was buried in Saint Sever Cemetery Extension in Rouen.

== Mutiny ==
On Sunday 9 September 1917, Gunner A. J. Healy, a New Zealander belonging to No. 27 Infantry Base Depot, was placed under arrest after he and other men were observed to have deliberately bypassed the military police picket at the bridges that gave access to Le Touquet, which was out of bounds to other ranks. His son later recalled,

It was the practice for those who wished to visit the township to walk across the estuary or river mouth at low tide, do their thing and return accordingly. However in my father's case the tide came in, in the interval and to avoid being charged as a deserter, he returned across the bridge and was apprehended as a deserter by the "Red Caps" and placed in an adjoining cell or lock up. When news of this action reached the NZ garrison, the troops left in a mass and proceeded to the lock up.

A large crowd of angry soldiers from the camp rapidly gathered near the Pont des Trois Arches and in a crowd moved towards the town, failing to disperse, even after being told that Healy had been released. It was clear that the protest over the arrest was only the tip of an iceberg of ill-feeling and insubordination in the camp with the crowd now seeking some form of confrontation out of it. The arrival of a detachment of military police only made matters worse, and scuffles broke out between it and elements of the crowd. Suddenly the sound of shooting broke out, with Pte. H. Reeve, a military policeman, having fired at the crowd with a revolver, killing Corporal William Buchan Wood, 4th Battalion Gordon Highlanders, and injuring a French civilian woman standing in the Rue de Huguet. Thereafter, the police detachment fled, in fear of a violent confrontation with the mass of soldiers. News of the shooting spread quickly; by 7:30 p.m., over a thousand angry men were pursuing military police detachments, which withdrew from the camp back into the town. The following morning measures were taken to prevent further outbreaks of disorder and police pickets were stationed on the bridges leading into the town. At 4:00 p.m., troops from the camp were in a state of disorder once more and had broken through the police pickets and moved into the town, where they held impromptu meetings, followed by sporadic protest demonstrations around the camp.

On Tuesday 11 September 1917, fearing further outbreaks of disorder that were beyond the capability of the military police to handle, the Base Commandant requested reinforcements, as further protests gathered momentum. On Wednesday, 12 September, in spite of a proclaimed order confining them to camp, over a thousand men broke out and marched through Étaples. Later in the day four hundred officers and men from the Honourable Artillery Company (HAC) arrived, armed with wooden staves along with their firearms. The HAC detachment was composed mainly of officer cadets and was a unit on which complete reliance could be placed by the military authorities. The HAC were supported by an armed Section from the Machine Gun Corps, with several Vickers guns. The arrival of this security detachment quelled the unrest, with 300 men in revolt being arrested within Étaples' precincts without further violence.

Many of the men were charged with military offences and Corporal Jesse Robert Short of the Northumberland Fusiliers was condemned to death on the charge of "Attempted Mutiny". He was found guilty of encouraging his men to put down their weapons and attack an officer, Captain Eric Wilkinson of the West Yorkshire Regiment. Three other soldiers were tried by court martial and received sentences of 10 years' imprisonment. The sentences passed on the remainder involved 10 soldiers being jailed for up to a year with hard labour, another 33 men were sentenced to between seven and ninety days field punishment and others were fined or reduced in rank. Short was executed by firing squad on 4 October 1917 at Boulogne. His body was buried in Boulogne Eastern Cemetery.

== In popular culture ==
War poet Wilfred Owen, resting at Étaples on his way to the line, described the context of the mutiny:

"I thought of the very strange look on all the faces in that camp; an incomprehensible look, which a man will never see in England; nor can it be seen in any battle but only in Etaples. It was not despair, or terror, it was more terrible than terror, for it was a blindfold look and without expression, like a dead rabbit's."

Siegfried Sassoon's poem "Base Details" expressed the contempt of infantry veterans for the officers and NCOs who staffed Étaples:

If I were fierce, and bald, and short of breath,
I'd live with scarlet Majors at the Base,
And speed glum heroes up the line to death.
You'd see me with my puffy petulant face,
Guzzling and gulping in the best hotel,
Reading the Roll of Honour. 'Poor young chap,'
I'd say—'I used to know his father well;
Yes, we've lost heavily in this last scrap.'
And when the war is done and youth stone dead,
I'd toddle safely home and die—in bed.

An Australian war-artist, Iso Rae, visited the camp during the war and depicted it in paintings.

The English writer Vera Brittain served in the VAD at Étaples at the time of the mutiny; she describes the atmosphere of rumour and secrecy in her book Testament of Youth. Female personnel "were shut up in our hospitals to meditate on the effect of three years of war upon the splendid morale of our noble troops". Meanwhile, "numerous drunken and dilapidated warriors from the village battle were sent to spare beds..... for slight repairs." She says that it was mid-October before the mutiny ended. In a subsequent footnote she concludes that "the mutiny was due to repressive conditions......and was provoked by the military police".

William Allison and John Fairley's 1978 book The Monocled Mutineer gave a very imaginative account of the life and death of Percy Toplis and of his involvement in the mutiny. It prompted questions in Parliament about the events of the mutiny when it was first published, which led to the discovery that all the records of the Étaples Board of Enquiry had long since been destroyed. A BBC1 television series, also entitled The Monocled Mutineer, was adapted from the book, and caused some controversy at the time of its first transmission in 1986, being used by the press to attack the BBC for left-wing bias. Some advertising material issued to promote the series inadvisedly claimed that it was a "true-life story". Official records show that Toplis's regiment was en route to India during the Étaples mutiny. No evidence exists to show that Toplis was absent from his regiment.

Corporal Short's life was remembered in the song "Mutiny" by the English folk-rock band the Levellers on their album Static on the Airwaves.

The mutiny was depicted in a storyline of the British war comic strip Charley's War.

== See also ==
- 1915 Singapore Mutiny
- French Army Mutinies (1917)
- Egyptian Labour Corps mutinies
